= List of Supreme Court of Canada cases (Lamer Court) =

This is a chronological list of notable cases decided by the Supreme Court of Canada from appointment of Antonio Lamer as Chief Justice of Canada to his retirement.

== 1990 – 1994 ==
Case name	Citation	Date	Subject
July 1, 1990 – Appointment of Antonio Lamer as Chief Justice of Canada
Professional Institute of the Public Service of Canada v Northwest Territories (Commissioner)	[1990] 2 SCR 367	August 16, 1990	freedom of association; section 2(d)
Central Alberta Dairy Pool v Alberta (Human Rights Commission)	[1990] 2 SCR 489	September 13, 1990	freedom of religion; employer discrimination
R v Khan	[1990] 2 SCR 531	September 13, 1990	hearsay exception, children as witnesses
R v Martineau	[1990] 2 SCR 633	September 13, 1990	murder
R v J(JT)	[1990] 2 SCR 755		Young offenders
Clarke v Clarke	[1990] 2 SCR 795	October 4, 1990	pensions and matrimonial property
R v Hess; R v Nguyen	[1990] 2 SCR 906	October 4, 1990	Charter section 7, statutory rape
R v Askov	[1990] 2 SCR 1199	October 18, 1990	Charter right to be "tried within a reasonable time" (s. 11(b))
Steele v Mountain Institution	[1990] 2 SCR 1385	November 8, 1990	Cruel and unusual punishment, indeterminate sentences
R v Wong	[1990] 3 SCR 36	November 22, 1990	Electronic surveillance
McKinney v University of Guelph	[1990] 3 SCR 229	December 6, 1990	Case broadened the scope of the Charter, elaborated use of section 15.
Stoffman v Vancouver General Hospital	[1990] 3 SCR 483	December 6, 1990	application of the Charter; age discrimination
Douglas/Kwantlen Faculty Assn v Douglas College	[1990] 3 SCR 570	December 13, 1990	Jurisdiction, remedies
R v Keegstra	[1990] 3 SCR 697	December 13, 1990	Hate propaganda
R v Andrews	[1990] 3 SCR 870	December 13, 1990	Freedom of expression
Morguard Investments Ltd v De Savoye	[1990] 3 SCR 1077	December 20, 1990	conflict of laws
R v Chaulk	[1990] 3 SCR 1303	December 20, 1990	mental disorder defence
Committee for the Commonwealth of Canada v Canada	[1991] 1 SCR 139	January 25, 1991	Freedom of political expression, reasonable limitations of rights
R v Sullivan	[1991] 1 SCR 489	March 21, 1991	Fetus as a legal person
R v W(D)	[1991] 1 SCR 742	March 28, 1991	Charge to juries
R v Evans	[1991] 1 SCR 869	April 18, 1991	Right to counsel
R v Swain	[1991] 1 SCR 933	May 2, 1991	arbitrary detention, Charter section 7
Cuddy Chicks Ltd v Ontario (Labour Relations Board)	[1991] 2 SCR 5	June 6, 1991	jurisdiction
Tétreault-Gadoury v Canada (Employment and Immigration Commission)	[1991] 2 SCR 22	June 6, 1991	jurisdiction
Osborne v Canada (Treasury Board)	[1991] 2 SCR 69	June 6, 1991	political neutrality of public service, freedom of expression
Reference Re Provincial Electoral Boundaries (Sask)	[1991] 2 SCR 158	June 6, 1991	Right to vote, representation
Lavigne v Ontario Public Service Employees Union	[1991] 2 SCR 211	June 27, 1991	Freedom of association, freedom of expression
Reference Re Canada Assistance Plan (BC)	[1991] 2 SCR 525	August 15, 1991	Jurisdiction of section 96 courts.
R v Seaboyer	[1991] 2 SCR 577	August 22, 1991	right to full answer and defence
R v Jobidon	[1991] 2 SCR 714	September 26, 1991	Defence of consent
Kindler v Canada (Minister of Justice)	[1991] 2 SCR 779	September 26, 1991	extradition
Reference Re Ng Extradition	[1991] 2 SCR 858	September 26, 1991	extradition to country with death penalty
Pearlman v Manitoba Law Society Judicial Committee	[1991] 2 SCR 869	September 26, 1991	section 7
R v McCraw	[1991] 3 SCR 72		rape threats
R v Wholesale Travel Group Inc	[1991] 3 SCR 154	October 24, 1991	Strict liability offences
R v Gruenke	[1991] 3 SCR 263	October 24, 1991	case-by-case privilege.
R v Stinchcombe	[1991] 3 SCR 326	November 7, 1991	disclosure of evidence
R v Goltz	[1991] 3 SCR 485	November 14, 1991	cruel and unusual punishment, section 12
R v Broyles	[1991] 3 SCR 595	November 28, 1991	Right to silence
Canadian Council of Churches v Canada (Minister of Employment and Immigration)	[1992] 1 SCR 236	January 23, 1992	Standing
R v Genereux	[1992] 1 SCR 259	February 13, 1992	constitutionality of being tried by court martial.
R v Butler	[1992] 1 SCR 452	February 27, 1992	pornography and freedom of expression
R v Wise	[1992] 1 SCR 527		Section 8, Electronic Surveillance
Newfoundland Telephone Co v Newfoundland (Board of Commissioners of Public Utilities)	[1992] 1 SCR 623	March 5, 1992	Administrative law, reasonable apprehension of bias
Canada (Minister of Employment and Immigration) v Chiarelli	[1992] 1 SCR 711	March 26, 1992	Charter rights, deportation for crime
R v Morin	[1992] 1 SCR 771	March 26, 1992	Right to trial within a reasonable time
Reference Re Milgaard (Can)	[1992] 1 SCR 866		
Canadian National Railway Co v Norsk Pacific Steamship Co	[1992] 1 SCR 1021	April 30, 1992	sets forth categories of recoverable economic loss.
Norberg v Wynrib	[1992] 2 SCR 224, [1992] 2 SCR 226, [1992] 2 SCR 318		tort law
Reference re Goods and Services Tax	[1992] 2 SCR 445		
R v Nova Scotia Pharmaceutical Society	[1992] 2 SCR 606	July 9, 1992	section 7
Schachter v Canada	[1992] 2 SCR 679	July 9, 1992	remedies of Constitution; section 52; section 24(1)
R v Zundel	[1992] 2 SCR 731	August 27, 1992	Freedom of expression
R v Smith	[1992] 2 SCR 915	August 27, 1992	Hearsay exceptions
R v Parks	[1992] 2 SCR 871	August 27, 1992	defence of automatism
R v DeSousa	[1992] 2 SCR 944	September 24, 1992	predicate offences, requirement for mens rea
Central Okanagan School District No 23 v Renaud	[1992] 2 SCR 970	September 24, 1992	Human Right Act
Ciba-Geigy Canada Ltd v Apotex Inc	[1992] 3 SCR 120		passing off
Haig v Canada (Chief Electoral Officer)	[1992] 3 SCR 163	September 2, 1993	right to vote
London Drugs Ltd v Kuehne & Nagel International Ltd	[1992] 3 SCR 299	October 29, 1992	privity
R v Morales	[1992] 3 SCR 711	November 19, 1992	right to reasonable bail
Moge v Moge	[1992] 3 SCR 813	December 17, 1992	spousal support
BG Checo International Ltd v British Columbia Hydro and Power Authority	[1993] 1 SCR 12	January 21, 1993	grounds for civil actions
New Brunswick Broadcasting Co v Nova Scotia (Speaker of the House of Assembly)	[1993] 1 SCR 319	January 21, 1993	Parliamentary privileges
The Rhône v The Peter AB Widener	[1993] 1 SCR 497		corporate liability
Canada (AG) v Mossop	[1993] 1 SCR 554	February 25, 1993	equality rights
R v B (KG)	[1993] 1 SCR 740	February 25, 1993	prior inconsistent statements
Reference Re Public Schools Act (Man)	[1993] 1 SCR 839		
R v Hundal	[1993] 1 SCR 867	March 11, 1993	criminal fault standard.
Amchem Products Inc v British Columbia (Workers' Compensation Board)	[1993] 1 SCR 897	March 25, 1993	conflict of laws, forum selection
Hall v Hebert	[1993] 2 SCR 159	April 29, 1993	Ex turpi causa non oritur actio, contributory negligence
Canada (AG) v Ward	[1993] 2 SCR 689	June 30, 1993	Refugee, persecution
Ramsden v Peterborough (City of)	[1993] 2 SCR 1084	September 2, 1993	Freedom of expression
R v Creighton	[1993] 3 SCR 3	September 9, 1993	criminal fault standard.
R v Plant	[1993] 3 SCR 281	September 30, 1993	search of computer records; search of perimeter of property
Ontario Hydro v Ontario (Labour Relations Board)	[1993] 3 SCR 327	September 30, 1993	federalism, federal declaratory power
R v Morgentaler	[1993] 3 SCR 463	September 30, 1993	The constitutionality of provincial regulations of abortion.
Rodriguez v British Columbia (AG)	[1993] 3 SCR 519	September 30, 1993	right to suicide
R v Dersch	[1993] 3 SCR 768	October 21, 1993	
R v Marquard	[1993] 4 SCR 223	October 21, 1993	expert evidence
Hunt v T&N plc	[1993] 4 SCR 289	November 18, 1993	conflict of laws
R v Finta	[1994] 1 SCR 701	March 24, 1994	war crimes and crimes against humanity
R v Mohan	[1994] 2 SCR 9	May 5, 1994	expert testimony
R v Daviault	[1994] 3 SCR 63	September 30, 1994	defence of intoxication
R v Bartle	[1994] 3 SCR 173	September 29, 1994	right to be informed on arrest of duty counsel
R v Prosper	[1994] 3 SCR 236	September 29, 1994	right to retain counsel s.10(b) of Charter
Native Women's Association of Canada v Canada	[1994] 3 SCR 627	October 27, 1994	positive obligations on the government under freedom of expression in the Charter.
R v Heywood	[1994] 3 SCR 761	November 24, 1994	Section Seven challenge, Overbreadth
Dagenais v Canadian Broadcasting Corp	[1994] 3 SCR 835	December 8, 1994	publication bans, freedom of expression
R v Laba	[1994] 3 SCR 965	December 8, 1994	presumption of innocence
Tolofson v Jensen	[1994] 3 SCR 1022	December 15, 1994	conflict of laws in tort

== 1995 – 1999 ==
Case name	Citation	Date	Subject
Stewart v Pettie	[1995] 1 SCR 131	January 26, 1995	Duty of Care in social host liability
Canadian Broadcasting Corp v Canada (Labour Relations Board)	[1995] 1 SCR 157	January 27, 1995	Standard of review for administrative tribunals
R v Burlingham	[1995] 2 SCR 206	May 18, 1995	Right to counsel
Miron v Trudel	[1995] 2 SCR 418	May 25, 1995	section 15
Egan v Canada	[1995] 2 SCR 513	May 25, 1995	sexual orientation, ground of discrimination under the Charter.
Thibaudeau v Canada	[1995] 2 SCR 627	May 25, 1995	Charter equality rights; section 7
R v Park	[1995] 2 SCR 836	June 22, 1995	established the mistaken belief in consent defence
Weber v Ontario Hydro	[1995] 2 SCR 929	June 29, 1995	concurrency of court jurisdiction; collective agreements
R v Hibbert	[1995] 2 SCR 973	February 22, 1996	Aiding and abetting, duress
Hill v Church of Scientology of Toronto	[1995] 2 SCR 1130	July 20, 1995	defamation; Charter interpretation
RJR-MacDonald Inc v Canada (AG)	[1995] 3 SCR 199	September 21, 1995	tobacco, freedom of speech.
Husky Oil Operations Ltd v Canada (Minister of Natural Resources)	[1995] 3 SCR 453	October 19, 2005	applicability, paramountcy
Chan v Canada (Minister of Employment and Immigration)	[1995] 3 SCR 593	October 19, 1995	Convention refugee status
R v Jorgensen	[1995] 4 SCR 55	November 16, 1995	obscenity
R v O'Connor	[1995] 4 SCR 411	December 14, 1995	privilege for doctor's records
Hollis v Dow Corning Corp	[1995] 4 SCR 634	December 21, 1995	Product liability
R (Canada) v Adams	[1995] 4 SCR 707		publication ban
R v Edwards	[1996] 1 SCR 128		Test for Reasonable Expectation of Privacy in Section 8 of the Charter
Reference Re Amendments to the Residential Tenancies Act (NS)	[1996] 1 SCR 186	February 22, 1996	Jurisdiction of section 96 courts
R v Badger	[1996] 1 SCR 771	April 3, 1996	aboriginal treaty rights
Ross v New Brunswick School District No 15	[1996] 1 SCR 825		
R v Van der Peet	[1996] 2 SCR 507	August 21, 1996	section 35 aboriginal rights
R v Gladstone	[1996] 2 SCR 723	August 21, 1996	aboriginal fishing rights
R v Pamajewon	[1996] 2 SCR 821	August 22, 1996	aboriginal self-government
Adler v Ontario (AG)	[1996] 3 SCR 609	November 21, 1996	private denominational education
R v Latimer	[1997] 1 SCR 217	February 6, 1997	arbitrary detention, the right to informed of reasons for arrest or detention, the right to be informed that one may seek counsel
R v Stillman	[1997] 1 SCR 607	March 20, 1997	exclusion of evidence, s.24(2) of the Charter
Canada (Director of Investigation and Research) v Southam Inc	[1997] 1 SCR 748	March 20, 1997	judicial review
Hercules Managements Ltd v Ernst & Young	[1997] 2 SCR 165	May 22, 1997	Novel duties of care, auditors' liability
R v Noble	[1997] 1 SCR 874		right to silence
R v Feeney	[1997] 2 SCR 13	May 22, 1997	section 8 of the Charter
Eldridge v British Columbia (AG)	[1997] 2 SCR 624	October 9, 1997	section 32 and 15 of the Charter
Provincial Judges Reference	[1997] 3 SCR 3	September 18, 1997	Remuneration of Provincial Court Judges
R v Hydro-Québec	[1997] 3 SCR 213	September 18, 1997	Constitutional criminal law power, peace, order and good government
R v Lifchus	[1997] 3 SCR 320	September 18, 1997	beyond a reasonable doubt standard
R v Belnavis	[1997] 3 SCR 341	September 25, 1997	search and seizure
R v S (RD)	[1997] 3 SCR 484	September 26, 1997	judge's use of personal experiences in deciding cases.
Libman v Quebec (AG)	[1997] 3 SCR 569	October 9, 1997	election law, freedom of expression and association
Wallace v United Grain Growers Ltd	[1997] 3 SCR 701	October 30, 1997	damages for wrongful dismissal where employer exercises bad faith in terminating employment
Godbout v Longueuil (City of)	[1997] 3 SCR 844	October 31, 1997	section 7; restriction on residence
Delgamuukw v British Columbia	[1997] 3 SCR 1010	December 11, 1997	aboriginal title, right to self-government.
Re Remuneration of Judges (No 2)	[1998] 1 SCR 3	February 10, 1998	aftermath of Provincial Judges Reference; doctrine of necessity
R v Lucas	[1998] 1 SCR 439	April 2, 1998	defamatory libel, freedom of expression
Vriend v Alberta	[1998] 1 SCR 493	April 2, 1998	provincial governments cannot exclude sexual orientation from human rights codes.
Aubry v Éditions Vice-Versa Inc	[1998] 1 SCR 591	April 9, 1998	Privacy rights; invasion of privacy
Thomson Newspapers Co Ltd v Canada (AG)	[1998] 1 SCR 877	May 29, 1998	Freedom of expression
Pushpanathan v Canada (Minister of Citizenship and Immigration)	[1998] 1 SCR 982	June 4, 1998	Refugees, Administrative law
Eli Lilly & Co v Novopharm Ltd	[1998] 2 SCR 129		patents
Reference Re Secession of Quebec	[1998] 2 SCR 217	August 20, 1998	Constitutionality of unilateral separation of Quebec
R v Cuerrier	[1998] 2 SCR 371	December 3, 1998	criminal law
Canadian Egg Marketing Agency v Richardson	[1998] 3 SCR 157	May 30, 1997	Standing; Section Six of the Canadian Charter of Rights and Freedoms
Cadbury Schweppes Inc v FBI Foods Ltd	[1999] 1 SCR 142	January 28, 1999	Breach of confidence and appropriate remedies
R v Godoy	[1999] 1 SCR 311	February 4, 1999	Rights against police entering private residence.
R v Ewanchuk	[1999] 1 SCR 330	February 25, 1999	consent as defence to sexual assault
Law v Canada (Minister of Employment and Immigration)	[1999] 1 SCR 497	March 25, 1999	section 15
MJB Enterprises Ltd v Defence Construction (1951) Ltd	[1999] 1 SCR 619		Tendering contracts
R v Monney	[1999] 1 SCR 652		
R v Beaulac	[1999] 1 SCR 768	May 20, 1999	language rights
M v H	[1999] 2 SCR 3	May 20, 1999	rights of same-sex couples
Corbiere v Canada (Minister of Indian and Northern Affairs)	[1999] 2 SCR 203, 1999 SCC 29	May 20, 1999	Equality rights, right to vote.
R v Stone	[1999] 2 SCR 290	May 27, 1999	mental disorder defence
R v White	[1999] 2 SCR 417		
Bazley v Curry	[1999] 2 SCR 534	June 17, 1999	vicarious liability
Jacobi v Griffiths	[1999] 2 SCR 570	June 17, 1999	vicarious liability
Winko v British Columbia (Forensic Psychiatric Institute)	[1999] 2 SCR 625	June 17, 1999	Mental disorder and criminal law; Charter
Dobson (Litigation guardian of) v Dobson	[1999] 2 SCR 753	July 9, 1999	Pregnancy and torts
Baker v Canada (Minister of Citizenship and Immigration)	[1999] 2 SCR 817	July 9, 1999	Judicial review
Delisle v Canada (Deputy AG)	[1999] 2 SCR 989	September 2, 1999	association; expression; equality
United Food and Commercial Workers, Local 1518 v KMart Canada Ltd	[1999] 2 SCR 1083	September 9, 1999	Freedom of expression; picketing
British Columbia (Public Service Employee Relations Commission) v British Columbia Government Service Employees' Union	[1999] 3 SCR 3	September 9, 1999	Human Rights legislation; discrimination
R v Marshall	[1999] 3 SCR 45		aboriginal fishing rights.
New Brunswick (Minister of Health and Community Services) v G (J)	[1999] 3 SCR 46	September 10, 1999	access to legal aid
Fraser River Pile & Dredge Ltd v Can-Dive Services Ltd	[1999] 3 SCR 108	September 10, 1999	privity
R v Mills	[1999] 3 SCR 668	November 25, 1999	privilege, disclosure of evidence
British Columbia (Superintendent of Motor Vehicles) v British Columbia (Council of Human Rights)	[1999] 3 SCR 868	December 16, 1999	discrimination based on disability
January 6, 2000 – retirement of Chief Justice Antonio Lamer.

== See also ==
- List of notable Canadian Courts of Appeals cases
