= 1999 reasons of the Supreme Court of Canada =

The table below lists the reasons delivered from the bench by the Supreme Court of Canada during 1999. The table illustrates what reasons were filed by each justice in each case, and which justices joined each reason. This list, however, does not include decisions on motions.

Of the 73 judgments released in 1999, 12 were oral, and 42 were unanimous. There were also 5 motions.

== Reasons ==
Case name	Argued	Decided	Lamer	L'Heureux-Dubé	Gonthier	Cory	McLachlin	Iacobucci	Major	Bastarache	Binnie	Arbour
Del Zotto v Canada, [1999] 1 S.C.R. 3	January 20, 1999	January 21, 1999										
Zink v Graybec Immobilier Inc, [1999] 1 S.C.R. 6	January 21, 1999	January 21, 1999						V				
Chambly (City of) v Gagnon, [1999] 1 S.C.R. 8	January 25, 1999	January 25, 1999			V							
Vancouver Society of Immigrant and Visible Minority Women v MNR, [1999] 1 S.C.R. 10	February 23, 1998	January 28, 1999										
Cadbury Schweppes Inc v FBI Foods Ltd, [1999] 1 S.C.R. 142	April 30, 1998	January 28, 1999										
Ryan v Victoria (City of), [1999] 1 S.C.R. 201	June 17, 1998	January 28, 1999										
Chartier v Chartier, [1999] 1 S.C.R. 242	November 12, 1998	January 28, 1999										
Sail Labrador Ltd v Challenge One (The), [1999] 1 S.C.R. 265	October 9, 1998	February 4, 1999										
R v Godoy, [1999] 1 S.C.R. 311	December 2, 1998	February 4, 1999										
R v Ewanchuk, [1999] 1 S.C.R. 330	October 14, 1998	February 25, 1999										
Case name	Argued	Decided	Lamer	L'Heureux-Dubé	Gonthier	Cory	McLachlin	Iacobucci	Major	Bastarache	Binnie	Arbour
R v WS(R), [1999] 1 S.C.R. 391	March 17, 1999	March 17, 1999				V						
Smith v Jones, [1999] 1 S.C.R. 455	October 8, 1998	March 25, 1999										
R v Sundown, [1999] 1 S.C.R. 393	November 3, 1998	March 25, 1999										
Law v Canada (Minister of Employment and Immigration), [1999] 1 S.C.R. 497	December 3, 1998	March 25, 1999										
Bracklow v Bracklow, [1999] 1 S.C.R. 420	November 6, 1998	March 25, 1999										
R v Campbell, [1999] 1 S.C.R. 565	May 28, 1998	April 22, 1999										
MJB Enterprises Ltd v Defence Construction (1951) Ltd, [1999] 1 S.C.R. 619		April 22, 1999										
R v Trombley, [1999] 1 S.C.R. 757	April 23, 1999	April 23, 1999	V									
R v Monney, [1999] 1 S.C.R. 652	December 4, 1998	April 23, 1999										
R v Gladue, [1999] 1 S.C.R. 688	December 10, 1998	April 23, 1999										
Case name	Argued	Decided	Lamer	L'Heureux-Dubé	Gonthier	Cory	McLachlin	Iacobucci	Major	Bastarache	Binnie	Arbour
CanadianOxy Chemicals Ltd v Canada (AG), [1999] 1 S.C.R. 743	December 10, 1998	April 23, 1999										
Quebec (Deputy Minister of Revenue) v Nolisair International Inc (Trustee of); Sécurité Saglac (1992) Inc (Trustee of) v Quebec (Deputy Minister of Revenue), [1999] 1 S.C.R. 759	April 22, 1999	April 29, 1999										
R v Beaulac, [1999] 1 S.C.R. 768	February 24, 1999	May 20, 1999										
Novak v Bond, [1999] 1 S.C.R. 808	March 18, 1999	May 20, 1999										
M v H, [1999] 2 S.C.R. 3	March 18, 1998	May 20, 1999							1	2		
Corbiere v Canada (Minister of Indian and Northern Affairs), [1999] 2 S.C.R. 203	October 13, 1998	May 20, 1999										
R v Stone, [1999] 2 S.C.R. 290	June 26, 1998	May 27, 1999										
R v White, [1999] 2 S.C.R. 417	November 13, 1998	June 10, 1999										
R v G(B), [1999] 2 S.C.R. 475	January 29, 1999	June 10, 1999										
Hickey v Hickey, [1999] 2 S.C.R. 518	February 18, 1999	June 10, 1999										
Case name	Argued	Decided	Lamer	L'Heureux-Dubé	Gonthier	Cory	McLachlin	Iacobucci	Major	Bastarache	Binnie	Arbour
Winko v British Columbia (Forensic Psychiatric Institute), [1999] 2 S.C.R. 625	June 15, 16, 1998	June 17, 1999										
R v LePage, [1999] 2 S.C.R. 744	June 15, 16, 1998	June 17, 1999										
Orlowski v British Columbia (Forensic Psychiatric Institute), [1999] 2 S.C.R. 733	June 15, 16, 1998	June 17, 1999										
Jacobi v Griffiths, [1999] 2 S.C.R. 570	October 6, 1998	June 17, 1999										
Bese v British Columbia (Forensic Psychiatric Institute), [1999] 2 S.C.R. 722	June 15, 16, 1998	June 17, 1999										
Bazley v Curry, [1999] 2 S.C.R. 534	October 6, 1998	June 17, 1999										
Dobson (Litigation Guardian of) v Dobson, [1999] 2 S.C.R. 753	December 8, 1998	July 9, 1999										
Best v Best, [1999] 2 S.C.R. 868	February 17, 1999	July 9, 1999										
Baker v Canada (Minister of Citizenship and Immigration), [1999] 2 S.C.R. 817	November 4, 1998	July 9, 1999										
M & D Farm Ltd v Manitoba Agricultural Credit Corp, [1999] 2 S.C.R. 961	January 26, 1999	September 2, 1999										
Case name	Argued	Decided	Lamer	L'Heureux-Dubé	Gonthier	Cory	McLachlin	Iacobucci	Major	Bastarache	Binnie	Arbour
Delisle v Canada (Deputy AG), [1999] 2 S.C.R. 989	October 7, 1998	September 2, 1999										
United Food and Commercial Workers, Local 1518 v KMart Canada Ltd, [1999] 2 S.C.R. 1083	February 15, 16, 1999	September 9, 1999										
British Columbia (Public Service Employee Relations Commission) v British Columbia Government Service Employees' Union, [1999] 3 S.C.R. 3	February 22, 1999	September 9, 1999										
Allsco Building Products Ltd v United Food and Commercial Workers, Local 1288, [1999] 2 S.C.R. 1136	February 15, 1999	September 9, 1999										
Westbank First Nation v British Columbia Hydro and Power Authority, [1999] 3 S.C.R. 134	June 21, 1999	September 10, 1999										
New Brunswick (Minister of Health and Community Services) v G(J), [1999] 3 S.C.R. 46	November 9, 1998	September 10, 1999										
Fraser River Pile & Dredge Ltd v Can-Dive Services Ltd, [1999] 3 S.C.R. 108	February 25, 1999	September 10, 1999										
Winters v Legal Services Society, [1999] 3 S.C.R. 160	December 3, 1998	September 15, 1999										
Wells v Newfoundland, [1999] 3 S.C.R. 199	May 17, 1999	September 15, 1999										
R v Liew, [1999] 3 S.C.R. 227	March 19, 1999	September 16, 1999										
Case name	Argued	Decided	Lamer	L'Heureux-Dubé	Gonthier	Cory	McLachlin	Iacobucci	Major	Bastarache	Binnie	Arbour
Francis v Baker, [1999] 3 S.C.R. 250	April 27, 1999	September 16, 1999										
R v Marshall, [1999] 3 S.C.R. 456	November 5, 1998	September 17, 1999										
Poulin v Serge Morency et Associés Inc, [1999] 3 S.C.R. 351	April 21, 1999	September 17, 1999										
Perron-Malenfant v Malenfant (Trustee of), [1999] 3 S.C.R. 375	March 15, 1999	September 17, 1999										
Des Champs v Conseil des écoles séparées catholiques de langue française de Prescott-Russell, [1999] 3 S.C.R. 281	November 10, 1998	September 17, 1999										
Abouchar v Ottawa-Carleton French-language School Board – Public Sector, [1999] 3 S.C.R. 343	November 10, 1998	September 17, 1999										
R v Lance, [1999] 3 S.C.R. 658	October 7, 1999	October 7, 1999						V				
Shell Canada Ltd v Canada, [1999] 3 S.C.R. 622	June 14, 1999	October 15, 1999										
Royal Bank of Canada v W Got Associates Electric Ltd, [1999] 3 S.C.R. 408	December 2, 1998	October 15, 1999										
R v W(G), [1999] 3 S.C.R. 597	June 16, 1999	October 15, 1999										
Case name	Argued	Decided	Lamer	L'Heureux-Dubé	Gonthier	Cory	McLachlin	Iacobucci	Major	Bastarache	Binnie	Arbour
R v Fleming, [1999] 3 S.C.R. 662	October 15, 1999	October 15, 1999						V				
R v F(WJ), [1999] 3 S.C.R. 569	May 19, 1999	October 15, 1999										
R v Brown, [1999] 3 S.C.R. 660	October 15, 1999	October 15, 1999		V								
Guarantee Co of North America v Gordon Capital Corp, [1999] 3 S.C.R. 423	June 17, 1999	October 15, 1999										
R v Groot, [1999] 3 S.C.R. 664	November 5, 1999	November 5, 1999						V				
R v Timm, [1999] 3 S.C.R. 666	November 12, 1999	November 12, 1999		V								
R v Mills, [1999] 3 S.C.R. 668	January 19, 1999	November 25, 1999										
R v Davis, [1999] 3 S.C.R. 759	February 26, 1999	November 25, 1999										
65302 British Columbia Ltd v Canada, [1999] 3 S.C.R. 804	April 20, 1999	November 25, 1999										
Renaud v Quebec (Commission des affaires sociales), [1999] 3 S.C.R. 855	December 8, 1999	December 8, 1999								V		
Case name	Argued	Decided	Lamer	L'Heureux-Dubé	Gonthier	Cory	McLachlin	Iacobucci	Major	Bastarache	Binnie	Arbour
R v Pelletier, [1999] 3 S.C.R. 863	December 13, 1999	December 13, 1999						V				V
R v Terceira, [1999] 3 S.C.R. 866	December 16, 1999	December 16, 1999						V				
British Columbia (Superintendent of Motor Vehicles) v British Columbia (Council of Human Rights), [1999] 3 S.C.R. 868	October 13, 1999	December 16, 1999										

== Justices of the Supreme Court ==
Justice	Reasons written	Votes cast	% Majority
Chief Justice Antonio Lamer	5 / 0 / 1 / 2 / Total=08	31 / 1 / 0 / 3 / Total=35	37 of 43
Puisne Justice Claire L'Heureux-Dubé	5 / 5 / 2 / 1 / Total=13	41 / 5 / 0 / 3 / Total=49	56 of 62
Puisne Justice Charles Gonthier	4 / 4 / 0 / 2 / Total=10	47 / 4 / 0 / 1 / Total=52	59 of 62
Puisne Justice Peter Cory (retired June 1, 1999)	7 / 0 / 1 / 1 / Total=09	41 / 0 / 1 / 0 / Total=42	48 of 51
Puisne Justice Beverley McLachlin	14 / 1 / 0 / 3 / Total=18	43 / 1 / 0 / 1 / Total=45	59 of 63
Puisne Justice Frank Iacobucci	17 / 0 / 1 / 3 / Total=21	45 / 1 / 0 / 2 / Total=48	63 of 69
Puisne Justice John C. Major	6 / 1 / 0 / 5 / Total=12	48 / 0 / 0 / 2 / Total=50	55 of 62
Pusine Justice Michel Bastarache	11 / 2 / 0 / 0 / Total=13	44 / 1 / 0 / 0 / Total=45	58 of 58 (100%)
Puisne Justice Ian Binnie	8 / 2 / 0 / 1 / Total=10	51 / 1 / 0 / 1 / Total=53	61 of 63
Pusine Justice Louise Arbour (appointed September 15, 1999)	1 / 0 / 0 / 0 / Total=01	6 / 0 / 0 / 0 / Total=06	7 of 7 (100%)
This Notes on statistics: A justice is only included in the majority if they have joined or concurred in the Court's judgment in full. Percentages are based only on the cases in which a justice participated, and are rounded to the nearest tenth of a percent.

== Key ==
Delivered the Court's reason
Joined the Court's reason
Filed a concurrence
Joined a concurrence
Filed a dissent
Joined a dissent
Filed a concurrence/dissent
Joined a concurrence/dissent
Did not participate in the judgment
Did not participate in the final disposition of the judgment
Not a member of the Court at the time of hearing or delivering
- Decisions that do not note a Justice delivering the Court's reason are per coram.
- Multiple concurrences and dissents within a case are numbered, with joining votes numbered accordingly. Justices occasionally join multiple reasons in a single case; each vote is subdivided accordingly.
- Multiple unnumbered reasons are jointly written or delivered.
- Decisions that are given orally from the bench are denoted by a "V"; per coram decisions delivered orally from the bench only note a "V" on the most senior justice on the panel.
- An asterisk ( * ) in the Court's opinion denotes that it was only a majority in part or a plurality.
