= Reasons of the Supreme Court of Canada by Justice Sopinka =

List of reasons written by Justice John Sopinka during his time as Puisne Justice of the Supreme Court of Canada.

== 1988–1990 ==
- United States v Cotroni, [1989] 1 SCR 1469 (Dissent)
- R v Hebert, [1990] 2 SCR 151 (Concurrence)
- Central Alberta Dairy Pool v Alberta (Human Rights Commission), [1990] 2 SCR 489 (Concurrence)
- R v Martineau, [1990] 2 SCR 633 (Concurrence)
- R v Askov, [1990] 2 SCR 1199 (Concurrence)
- R. v. Garofoli, [1990] 2 S.C.R. 1421 (Majority)
- Douglas/Kwantlen Faculty Assn v Douglas College, [1990] 3 SCR 570 (Concurrence)

== 1991–1993 ==
- Reference re Provincial Electoral Boundaries (Sask), [1991] 2 SCR 158 (Concurrence)
- Reference Re Canada Assistance Plan (BC), [1991] 2 SCR 525 (Majority)
- R v Stinchcombe, [1991] 3 SCR 326 (Majority)
- R v Jobidon, [1991] 2 SCR 714 (Dissent)
- Reference Re Ng Extradition [1991] 2 SCR 858 (Dissent)
- R v Butler, 1992 (Majority)
- R v DeSousa, 1992 (Majority)
- Canada (Minister of Employment and Immigration) v Chiarelli, [1992] 1 SCR 711 (Majority)
- New Brunswick Broadcasting Co v Nova Scotia (Speaker of the House of Assembly), [1993] 1 SCR 319 (Concurrence)
- Amchem Products Inc v British Columbia (Workers' Compensation Board), [1993] 1 SCR 897 (Majority)
- R v Morgentaler [1993] 3 SCR 463 (Majority)
- Rodriguez v British Columbia (AG), [1993] 3 SCR 519 (Majority)

== 1994–1997 ==
- Native Women's Assn of Canada v Canada, [1994] 3 SCR 627 (Majority)
- R v Mohan, [1994] 2 SCR 9 (Concurrence)
- R v Daviault [1994] 3 SCR 6 (Dissent)
- R v Burlingham, [1995] 2 SCR 206 (Concurrence)
- Egan v Canada, [1995] 2 SCR 513 (Concurrence)
- R v Park, [1995] 2 SCR 836 (Concurrence)
- R v Jorgensen, [1995] 4 SCR 55 (Majority)
- Adler v Ontario (AG), [1996] 3 SCR 609 (Concurrence)
- R v Badger, [1996] 1 SCR 771 (Concurrence)
- R v Feeney, [1997] 2 SCR 13 (Majority)

Note: This list is incomplete
