= Reasons of the Supreme Court of Canada by Chief Justice Lamer =

This is a list of opinions written by Antonio Lamer during his tenure as on the Supreme Court of Canada between March 28, 1980, and January 6, 2000.

Note: This part of the list is incomplete

- Reference Re BC Motor Vehicle Act, [1985] 2 SCR 486
- R v Collins, [1987] 1 SCR 265
- R v Rahey, [1987] 1 SCR 588
- R v Manninen, [1987] 1 SCR 1233
- R v Vaillancourt, [1987] 2 SCR 636
- R v Dyment, [1988] 2 SCR 417
- Edmonton Journal v Alberta (AG), [1989] 2 SCR 1326
- R v Martineau, [1990] 2 SCR 633
- R v Brydges, [1990] 1 SCR 190
- R v Chaulk, [1990] 3 SCR 1303
- R v Sullivan,[1991] 1 SCR 489
- R v Gruenke, [1991] 3 SCR 263
- R v Genereux, [1992] 1 SCR 259
- Schachter v Canada, [1992] 2 SCR 679
- R v Morales, [1992] 3 SCR 711
- Reference Re Public Schools Act (Man), s 79(3), (4) and (7), [1993] 1 SCR 839
- R v Creighton, [1993] 3 SCR 3 (dissent)
- Rodriguez v British Columbia (AG), [1993] 3 SCR 519 (dissent)
- RJR-MacDonald Inc v Canada (AG), [1994] 1 SCR 311
- R v Bartle, [1994] 3 SCR 173
- R v Prosper, [1994] 3 SCR 236
- Dagenais v Canadian Broadcasting Corp, [1994] 3 SCR 835
- R v Van der Peet, [1996] 2 SCR 507
- R v Gladstone, [1996] 2 SCR 723
- R v Latimer, [1997] 1 SCR 217
- Provincial Judges Reference, [1997] 3 SCR 3
- Re Remuneration of Judges (No 2), [1998] 1 SCR 3

== 1998 ==
- Vriend v Alberta, [1998] 1 SCR 493

== 1999 ==
- R v Godoy, [1999] 1 SCR 311 (Maj)
- R v Trombley, [1999] 1 SCR 757 (Maj/oral)
- R v Beaulac, [1999] 1 SCR 768 (Con)
- New Brunswick (Minister of Health and Community Services) v G (J), [1999] 3 SCR 46 (Maj)
- R v Liew, [1999] 3 SCR 227 (diss)
- R v W (G), [1999] 3 SCR 597 (maj)
- R v F (WJ), [1999] 3 SCR 569 (diss)
- R v Mills, [1999] 3 SCR 668 (con/diss)
- R v Davis, [1999] 3 SCR 759 (maj)

== 2000 ==
- R v Proulx, [2000] 1 SCR 61; 2000 SCC 5 (Maj)
- R v LFW, [2000] 1 SCR 132; 2000 SCC 6 (Maj)
- R v RNS, [2000] 1 SCR 149; 2000 SCC 7 (Maj)
- R v RAR, [2000] 1 SCR 163; 2000 SCC 8 (Diss)
- R v Bunn, [2000] 1 SCR 183; 2000 SCC 9 (Maj)
