= 1998 reasons of the Supreme Court of Canada =

The table below lists the reasons delivered from the bench by the Supreme Court of Canada during 1998. The table illustrates what reasons were filed by each justice in each case, and which justices joined each reason. This list, however, does not include decisions on motions.

Of the 85 judgments released in 1998, 26 were oral. There were also motions.

== Reasons ==
Case name	Argued	Decided	Lamer	L'Heureux-Dubé	Sopinka	Gonthier	Cory	McLachlin	Iacobucci	Major	Bastarache	Binnie
Dowling v Halifax (City of), [1998] 1 S.C.R. 22	January 20, 1998	January 20, 1998					V					
Re Rizzo & Rizzo Shoes Ltd, [1998] 1 S.C.R. 27	October 16, 1997	January 22, 1998										
R v Underwood, [1998] 1 S.C.R. 77	December 4, 1997	January 22, 1998										
R v Taylor, [1998] 1 S.C.R. 26	January 22, 1998	January 22, 1998									V	
R v Poirier, [1998] 1 S.C.R. 24	January 22, 1998	January 22, 1998					V					
R v Caslake, [1998] 1 S.C.R. 51	November 10, 1997	January 22, 1998										
R v Maracle, [1998] 1 S.C.R. 86	January 23, 1998	January 23, 1998		V								
R v Horne, [1998] 1 S.C.R. 85	January 23, 1998	January 23, 1998					V					
R v Shalaan, [1998] 1 S.C.R. 88	January 28, 1998	January 28, 1998	V									
R v Bekoe, [1998] 1 S.C.R. 90	January 30, 1998	January 30, 1998					V					
Case name	Argued	Decided	Lamer	L'Heureux-Dubé	Sopinka	Gonthier	Cory	McLachlin	Iacobucci	Major	Bastarache	Binnie
Ref. re Remuneration of Judges of Prov. Court of PEI; Ref. re Independence & Impartiality of Judges of Prov. Court of PEI; R. v. Campbell; R. v. Ekmecic; R. v. Wickman; Manitoba Prov. Judges Assn. v. Manitoba (Min. of Justice), [1998] 1 S.C.R. 3	January 19, 1998	February 10, 1998										
Toronto College Park Ltd v Canada, [1998] 1 S.C.R. 183	December 2, 1997	February 12, 1998										
R v Malott, [1998] 1 S.C.R. 123	October 14, 1997	February 12, 1998										
IKEA Ltd v Canada, [1998] 1 S.C.R. 196	December 2, 1997	February 12, 1998										
Hall v Quebec (Deputy Minister of Revenue), [1998] 1 S.C.R. 220	December 3, 1997	February 12, 1998										
Giffen (Re), [1998] 1 S.C.R. 91	October 8, 1997	February 12, 1998										
Canderel Ltd v Canada, [1998] 1 S.C.R. 147	December 2, 1997	February 12, 1998										
R v Smith, [1998] 1 S.C.R. 291	December 5, 1997	February 19, 1998										
R v Skinner, [1998] 1 S.C.R. 298	December 5, 1997	February 19, 1998										
R v Robart, [1998] 1 S.C.R. 279	December 5, 1997	February 19, 1998										
Case name	Argued	Decided	Lamer	L'Heureux-Dubé	Sopinka	Gonthier	Cory	McLachlin	Iacobucci	Major	Bastarache	Binnie
R v McQuaid, [1998] 1 S.C.R. 285	December 5, 1997	February 19, 1998										
R v Dixon, [1998] 1 S.C.R. 244	December 5, 1997	February 19, 1998										
R v Bisson, [1998] 1 S.C.R. 306	January 30, 1998	February 19, 1998										
JM Asbestos Inc v Commission d'appel en matière de lésions professionnelles, [1998] 1 S.C.R. 315	February 23, 1998	February 23, 1998	V									
R v H(NG), [1998] 1 S.C.R. 318	February 27, 1998	February 27, 1998					V					
Westcoast Energy Inc v Canada (National Energy Board), [1998] 1 S.C.R. 322	November 12, 1997	March 19, 1998										
Fontaine v British Columbia (Official Administrator), [1998] 1 S.C.R. 424	November 14, 1997	March 19, 1998										
Vriend v Alberta, [1998] 1 S.C.R. 493	November 4, 1997	April 2, 1998										
R v Lucas, [1998] 1 S.C.R. 439	October 15, 1997	April 2, 1998										
R v Charemski, [1998] 1 S.C.R. 679	February 26, 1998	April 9, 1998										
Case name	Argued	Decided	Lamer	L'Heureux-Dubé	Sopinka	Gonthier	Cory	McLachlin	Iacobucci	Major	Bastarache	Binnie
Canada (Human Rights Commission) v Canadian Liberty Net, [1998] 1 S.C.R. 626	December 10, 1997	April 9, 1998										
Aubry v Éditions Vice-Versa inc, [1998] 1 S.C.R. 591	December 8, 1997	April 9, 1998										
R v Reed, [1998] 1 S.C.R. 753	April 29, 1998	April 29, 1998					V					
R v Jussila, [1998] 1 S.C.R. 755	April 29, 1998	April 29, 1998		V								
R v Consolidated Maybrun Mines Ltd, [1998] 1 S.C.R. 706	January 29, 1998	April 30, 1998										
R v Al Klippert Ltd, [1998] 1 S.C.R. 737	January 29, 1998	April 30, 1998										
Chippewas of Kettle and Stony Point v Canada (AG), [1998] 1 S.C.R. 756	May 19, 1998	May 19, 1998					V					
R v Reitsma, [1998] 1 S.C.R. 769	May 20, 1998	May 20, 1998					V					
Neuman v MNR, [1998] 1 S.C.R. 770	January 28, 1998	May 21, 1998										
R v Mullins-Johnson, [1998] 1 S.C.R. 977	May 26, 1998	May 26, 1998		V								
Case name	Argued	Decided	Lamer	L'Heureux-Dubé	Sopinka	Gonthier	Cory	McLachlin	Iacobucci	Major	Bastarache	Binnie
R v Bernier, [1998] 1 S.C.R. 975	May 26, 1998	May 26, 1998		V								
R v Druken, [1998] 1 S.C.R. 978	May 27, 1998	May 27, 1998	V									
Schreiber v Canada (AG), [1998] 1 S.C.R. 841	March 20, 1998	May 28, 1998										
Duha Printers (Western) Ltd v Canada, [1998] 1 S.C.R. 795	March 17, 1998	May 28, 1998										
Thomson Newspapers Co v Canada (AG), [1998] 1 S.C.R. 877	October 9, 1997	May 29, 1998										
R v Abdallah, [1998] 1 S.C.R. 980	May 29, 1998	May 29, 1998		V								
R v Williams, [1998] 1 S.C.R. 1128	February 24, 1998	June 4, 1998										
Pushpanathan v Canada (Minister of Citizenship and Immigration), [1998] 1 S.C.R. 982	October 9, 1997	June 4, 1998										
Canada Safeway Ltd v Retail, Wholesale and Department Store Union, Local 454, [1998] 1 S.C.R. 1079	January 27, 1998	June 4, 1998										
Battlefords and District Co-operatives Ltd v Retail, Wholesale and Department Store Union, Local 544, [1998] 1 S.C.R. 1118	January 27, 1998	June 4, 1998										
Case name	Argued	Decided	Lamer	L'Heureux-Dubé	Sopinka	Gonthier	Cory	McLachlin	Iacobucci	Major	Bastarache	Binnie
Union of New Brunswick Indians v New Brunswick (Minister of Finance), [1998] 1 S.C.R. 1161	March 25, 1998	June 18, 1998										
R v Puskas, [1998] 1 S.C.R. 1207	May 4, 1998.	June 18, 1998										
R v Gellvear, [1998] 1 S.C.R. 1218	June 23, 1998	June 23, 1998					V					
R v Daigle, [1998] 1 S.C.R. 1220	June 25, 1998	June 25, 1998		V								
R v White, [1998] 2 S.C.R. 72	March 26, 1998	July 9, 1998										
R v Ménard, [1998] 2 S.C.R. 109	March 26, 1998	July 9, 1998										
Merck Frosst Canada Inc v Canada (Minister of National Health and Welfare), [1998] 2 S.C.R. 193	January 21, 1998	July 9, 1998										
Gauthier v Beaumont, [1998] 2 S.C.R. 3	December 3, 1997	July 9, 1998										
Eli Lilly & Co v Novopharm Ltd, [1998] 2 S.C.R. 129	January 21, 1998	July 9, 1998										
Reference Re Secession of Quebec, [1998] 2 S.C.R. 217	February 16–19, 1998	August 20, 1998										
Case name	Argued	Decided	Lamer	L'Heureux-Dubé	Sopinka	Gonthier	Cory	McLachlin	Iacobucci	Major	Bastarache	Binnie
R v Cuerrier, [1998] 2 S.C.R. 371	March 27, 1998	September 3, 1998										
Continental Bank of Canada v Canada, [1998] 2 S.C.R. 358	January 26, 1998	September 3, 1998										
Continental Bank Leasing Corp v Canada, [1998] 2 S.C.R. 298	January 26, 1998	September 3, 1998										
R v Wells, [1998] 2 S.C.R. 517	March 24, 1998	September 24, 1998										
R v Hodgson, [1998] 2 S.C.R. 449	March 24, 1998	September 24, 1998										
R v Cook, [1998] 2 S.C.R. 597	June 17, 1998	October 1, 1998										
New Brunswick (Minister of Health and Community Services) v L(M), [1998] 2 S.C.R. 534	June 23, 1998	October 1, 1998										
R v W(DD), [1998] 2 S.C.R. 681	October 15, 1998	October 15, 1998				V						
R v Lauda, [1998] 2 S.C.R. 683	October 16, 1998	October 16, 1998					V					
Eurig Estate (Re), [1998] 2 S.C.R. 565	April 27, 1998	October 22, 1998										
Case name	Argued	Decided	Lamer	L'Heureux-Dubé	Sopinka	Gonthier	Cory	McLachlin	Iacobucci	Major	Bastarache	Binnie
Consortium Developments (Clearwater) Ltd v Sarnia (City of), [1998] 3 S.C.R. 3	March 16, 1998.	October 22, 1998										
R v MacDougall, [1998] 3 S.C.R. 45	May 21, 1998	October 29, 1998										
R v Gallant, [1998] 3 S.C.R. 80	May 21, 1998	October 29, 1998										
Garland v Consumers' Gas Co, [1998] 3 S.C.R. 112	March 23, 1998	October 30, 1998										
Degelder Construction Co v Dancorp Developments Ltd, [1998] 3 S.C.R. 90	March 23, 1998	October 30, 1998										
Lawlor v Royal, [1998] 3 S.C.R. 260	November 13, 1998	November 13, 1998							V			
R v Rose, [1998] 3 S.C.R. 262	February 25, 1998	November 26, 1998										
R v M(MR), [1998] 3 S.C.R. 393	June 25, 1998	November 26, 1998										
R v Arp, [1998] 3 S.C.R. 339	June 18, 1998	November 26, 1998										
Ordon Estate v Grail, [1998] 3 S.C.R. 437	June 22, 1998	November 26, 1998										
Case name	Argued	Decided	Lamer	L'Heureux-Dubé	Sopinka	Gonthier	Cory	McLachlin	Iacobucci	Major	Bastarache	Binnie
R v White, [1998] 3 S.C.R. 534	December 11, 1998	December 11, 1998					V					
R v Campbell, [1998] 3 S.C.R. 533	December 11, 1998	December 11, 1998					V					
R v Warsing, [1998] 3 S.C.R. 579	June 19, 1998	December 17, 1998										
R v Thomas, [1998] 3 S.C.R. 535	June 19, 1998	December 17, 1998										
R v Pearson, [1998] 3 S.C.R. 620	December 9, 1998	December 17, 1998										

== Key ==
Delivered the Court's reason
Joined the Court's reason
Filed a concurrence
Joined a concurrence
Filed a dissent
Joined a dissent
Filed a concurrence/dissent
Joined a concurrence/dissent
Did not participate in the judgment
Did not participate in the final disposition of the judgment
Not a member of the Court at the time of hearing or delivering
- Decisions that do not note a Justice delivering the Court's reason are per coram.
- Multiple concurrences and dissents within a case are numbered, with joining votes numbered accordingly. Justices occasionally join multiple reasons in a single case; each vote is subdivided accordingly.
- Multiple unnumbered reasons are jointly written or delivered.
- Decisions that are given orally from the bench are denoted by a "V"; per coram decisions delivered orally from the bench only note a "V" on the most senior justice on the panel.
- An asterisk ( * ) in the Court's opinion denotes that it was only a majority in part or a plurality.
