= Reasons of the Supreme Court of Canada by Justice Gonthier =

This is a list of all the opinions written by Charles Gonthier during his tenure as puisne justice of the Supreme Court of Canada.

== 1989-1998 ==
- IWA v. Consolidated-Bathurst Packaging Ltd., [1990] 1 S.C.R. 282
- National corn growers assn. v. Canada (Import tribunal), [1990] 2 S.C.R. 1324
- R. v. Jobidon, [1991] 2 S.C.R. 714
- Chrysler Canada Ltd. v. Canada (Competition Tribunal), [1992] 2 S.C.R. 394
- R. v. Nova Scotia Pharmaceutical Society, [1992] 2 S.C.R. 606
- Canada Labour Relations Board v. Québecair, [1993] 3 S.C.R. 724
- Béliveau St-Jacques v. Fédération des employées et employésde services publics inc., [1996] 2 S.C.R. 345

Note: This part of the list is incomplete

== 1999 ==
- Chambly (City) v. Gagnon, [1999] 1 S.C.R. 8
- Vancouver Society of Immigrant and Visible Minority Women v. M.N.R., [1999] 1 S.C.R. 10
- M. v. H., [1999] 2 S.C.R. 3
- Winko v. British Columbia (Forensic Psychiatric Institute), [1999] 2 S.C.R. 625
- R. v. LePage, [1999] 2 S.C.R. 744
- Orlowski v. British Columbia (Forensic Psychiatric Institute), [1999] 2 S.C.R. 733
- Bese v. British Columbia (Forensic Psychiatric Institute), [1999] 2 S.C.R. 722
- Westbank First Nation v. British Columbia Hydro and Power Authority, [1999] 3 S.C.R. 134
- Poulin v. Serge Morency et Associés Inc., [1999] 3 S.C.R. 351
- Perron-Malenfant v. Malenfant (Trustee of), [1999] 3 S.C.R. 375

== 2000 ==
- R. v. R.N.S., [2000] 1 S.C.R. 149; 2000 SCC 7
- Laflamme v. Prudential-Bache Commodities Canada Ltd., [2000] 1 S.C.R. 638; 2000 SCC 26
- R. v. Morrisey, [2000] 2 S.C.R. 90; 2000 SCC 39
- R. v. Darrach, [2000] 2 S.C.R. 443; 2000 SCC 46
- R. v. Lévesque, [2000] 2 S.C.R. 487; 2000 SCC 47
- Musqueam Indian Band v. Glass, [2000] 2 S.C.R. 633; 2000 SCC 52

== 2001 ==
- R. v. Sharpe, [2001] 1 S.C.R. 45; 2001 SCC 2
- Therrien (Re), [2001] 2 S.C.R. 3; 2001 SCC 35
- Fortin v. Chrétien, [2001] 2 S.C.R. 500; 2001 SCC 45
- Saint-Romuald (City) v. Olivier, [2001] 2 S.C.R. 898; 2001 SCC 57
- Autobus Thomas Inc. v. Canada, [2001] 3 S.C.R. 5; 2001 SCC 64
- Law Society of British Columbia v. Mangat, [2001] 3 S.C.R. 113; 2001 SCC 67
- Paul D'Aoust Construction Ltd. v. Markel Insurance Co. of Canada, [2001] 3 S.C.R. 744; 2001 SCC 84
- Osoyoos Indian Band v. Oliver (Town), [2001] 3 S.C.R. 746; 2001 SCC 85

== 2002 ==
- Mackin v. New Brunswick (Minister of Finance); Rice v. New Brunswick, [2002] 1 S.C.R. 405; 2002 SCC 13
- St-Jean v. Mercier, [2002] 1 S.C.R. 491; 2002 SCC 15
- Smith v. Co-operators General Insurance Co., [2002] 2 S.C.R. 129; 2002 SCC 30
- Théberge v. Galerie d'Art du Petit Champlain inc., [2002] 2 S.C.R. 336; 2002 SCC 34
- R. v. S.G.F., [2002] 2 S.C.R. 416; 2002 SCC 37
- Lavigne v. Canada (Office of the Commissioner of Official Languages), [2002] 2 S.C.R. 773; 2002 SCC 53
- CIBC Mortgage Corp. v. Vasquez, [2002] 3 S.C.R. 168; 2002 SCC 60
- B. v. Ontario (Human Rights Commission), [2002] 3 S.C.R. 403; 2002 SCC 66
- Sauvé v. Canada (Chief Electoral Officer), [2002] 3 S.C.R. 519; 2002 SCC 68
- Macdonell v. Quebec (Commission d'accès à l'information), [2002] 3 S.C.R. 661; 2002 SCC 71
- Nova Scotia (Attorney General) v. Walsh, [2002] 4 S.C.R. 325; 2002 SCC 83
- Chamberlain v. Surrey School District No. 36, [2002] 4 S.C.R. 710; 2002 SCC 86

== 2003 ==
- ParrySound (District) Social Services Administration Board v. O.P.S.E.U., Local 324, [2003] 2 S.C.R. 157; 2003 SCC 42
- Canada (Information Commissioner) v. Canada (Commissioner of the Royal Canadian Mounted Police), [2003] 1 S.C.R. 66; 2003 SCC 8
- R. v. Willis, [2003] 1 S.C.R. 127; 2003 SCC 12
- R. v. P.A., [2003] 1 S.C.R. 275; 2003 SCC 21
- R. v. Larue, [2003] 1 S.C.R. 277; 2003 SCC 22
- Barrie Public Utilities v. Canadian Cable Television Assn., [2003] 1 S.C.R. 476; 2003 SCC 28
- Caisse populaire Desjardins de Val-Brillant v. Blouin, [2003] 1 S.C.R. 666; 2003 SCC 31
- Wewaykum Indian Band v. Canada, [2003] 2 S.C.R. 259; 2003 SCC 45
- Nova Scotia (Workers' Compensation Board) v. Martin; Nova Scotia (Workers' Compensation Board) v. Laseur, [2003] 2 S.C.R. 504; 2003 SCC 54
- Gurniak v. Nordquist, [2003] 2 S.C.R. 652; 2003 SCC 59
- R. v. Malmo-Levine; R. v. Caine, [2003] 3 S.C.R. 571; 2003 SCC 74
- R. v. Clay, [2003] 3 S.C.R. 735; 2003 SCC 75

== 2004 ==
- Giguère v. Chambre des notaires du Québec, [2004] 1 S.C.R. 3; 2004 SCC 1
- I.A.T.S.E., Stage Local 56 v. Société de la Place des Arts de Montréal, [2004] 1 S.C.R. 43; 2004 SCC 2
