= R v Plant =

Judgement of the Supreme Court of Canada

- Supreme Court of Canada

Hearing: November 5, 1992 Judgment: September 30, 1993
- Citations: [1993] 3 SCR 281, 1993 CanLII 70 (SCC)
- Docket No.: 22606

Court membership
- Chief Justice: Antonio Lamer; Puisne Justices: Gérard La Forest, Claire L'Heureux-Dubé, John Sopinka, Charles Gonthier, Peter Cory, Beverley McLachlin, Frank Iacobucci, John C. Major

Reasons given

R v Plant, [1993] 3 S.C.R. 281 is a leading decision of the Supreme Court of Canada on the protection of personal information under the Canadian Charter of Rights and Freedoms. The issue was whether the warrantless perimeter search of the accused home and the seizure of electricity consumption records violated the accused's right against unreasonable search and seizure under section 8 of the Charter. The Court held that the seizure of consumption records was not in violation of section 8, but that the perimeter search did violate the Charter.

== See also ==
- List of Supreme Court of Canada cases (Lamer Court)
