= R v Belnavis =

- Supreme Court of Canada

Hearing: May 27, 1997 Judgment: September 25, 1997
- Full case name: Carol Lawrence and Alicia Belnavis v. Her Majesty The Queen
- Citations: [1997] 3 S.C.R. 341
- Docket No.: 25507
- Prior history: Judgment for the Crown in the Court of Appeal for Ontario.
- Ruling: Appeal dismissed.

Holding
- A driver of a motor vehicle generally has a reasonable expectation of privacy with the car and its contents. A passenger in a motor vehicle generally does not have a reasonable expectation of privacy with the car and its contents.

Court membership
- Chief Justice: Antonio Lamer; Puisne Justices: Gérard La Forest, Claire L'Heureux-Dubé, John Sopinka, Charles Gonthier, Peter Cory, Beverley McLachlin, Frank Iacobucci, John C. Major

Reasons given
- Majority: Cory J. (paras. 1-48), joined by Lamer C.J. and L'Heureux‑Dubé, Gonthier, McLachlin and Major JJ.
- Concurrence: Sopinka J. (paras. 71-72)
- Concur/dissent: Iacobucci J. (paras. 73-96)
- Dissent: La Forest J. (paras. 49-70)

R v Belnavis, [1997] 3 S.C.R. 341, is a leading Supreme Court of Canada decision on the right against unreasonable search and seizure under section 8 of the Canadian Charter of Rights and Freedoms. The Court held that there is no reasonable expectation of privacy in the backseat of a car.

== Background ==
Three young women were stopped by police for speeding. The police officer noticed bags in the backseat which were found to contain new clothes with price tags still on them. More bags were found in the trunk. Two of the girls gave differing stories as to who owned which bag. They were all charged with possession of stolen property.

At trial, it was held that the search was unreasonable and violated section 8 of the Charter. The evidence was excluded under section 24(2) and the girls were acquitted. On appeal the acquittal was quashed and a new trial was ordered.

The question before the Supreme Court was whether the officer violated a reasonable expectation of privacy under section 8 by searching the back seat, and if so, whether the evidence should be excluded under section 24(2).

== Reasons of the court ==
Justice Cory wrote for the majority.

On the first issue, Cory found that there was no expectation to privacy as she did not own the vehicle, she did not have any control over it, nor did she ever in the past, as well she had no relationship with the driver. She did not control access to the vehicle, nor was there any subjective evidence that she had expected there to be privacy in the vehicle.

On the second issue, Cory found that the evidence should not be excluded under section 24(2). An objective observer would find that the officer had reasonable and probable ground to suspect that the bags contained stolen property. Likewise, the officer had reasonable subjective belief in his grounds.

The violation would not affect trial fairness, the breach was isolated and brief and so was not serious. Consequently, the breach would not tend to bring the administration of justice into disrepute.

== Dissent ==
Justice La Forest wrote the dissent.

La Forest began by observing that a warrantless search is presumed to be unreasonable. La Forest looked to the American Fourth Amendment and noted that the constitutional right protected privacy, not property as was suggested by the majority. He warns of the dangers in allowing "open season" on vehicles.

== See also ==
- List of Supreme Court of Canada cases (Lamer Court)
