= R v Dersch =

- Supreme Court of Canada

Hearing: March 30, 1993 Judgment: October 21, 1993
- Full case name: Wilfred Wayne Dersch v. Her Majesty The Queen
- Citations: [1993] 3 S.C.R. 768
- Ruling: Dersch's appeal was allowed.

Court membership
- Chief Justice: Antonio Lamer; Puisne Justices: Gérard La Forest, Claire L'Heureux-Dubé, John Sopinka, Charles Gonthier, Peter Cory, Beverley McLachlin, Frank Iacobucci, John C. Major

Reasons given
- Majority: Major J., joined by Lamer C.J. and La Forest, Sopinka, Cory, McLachlin and Iacobucci JJ.
- Concurrence: L'Heureux‑Dubé J.
- Concurrence: Gonthier J.

R v Dersch, [1993] 3 S.C.R. 768 is a leading Supreme Court of Canada decision on the right against unreasonable search and seizure under section 8 of the Canadian Charter of Rights and Freedoms. The Court held that sharing of personal information of patients, such as blood test results, between health care professionals or law enforcement violates section 8 of the Charter and should be excluded under section 24(2).

== Background ==
In the evening of October 7, 1987, Wilfred Dersch was driving near Duncan, British Columbia. His car swerved into oncoming traffic and caused an accident, killing the other driver. When the police arrived Dersch refused the breathalyzer. The police noticed that his eyes were glazed and he appeared intoxicated. He was taken to the hospital where the doctor tried to give him an intravenous line which he resisted. Eventually he passed out and the intravenous was given and a blood sample was taken. The doctor tested the blood for alcohol content as it was necessary for treatment.

The police requested a blood sample from Dersch who refused. The police then asked for the medical report which the doctor gave them. It revealed that he was intoxicated at the time of treatment. Later, the police obtained a warrant to seize the blood sample.

At trial the judge found that there was no violation of section 8 as the blood sample was taken for medically necessary reasons. The decision was upheld in the British Columbia Court of Appeal.

The issues before the Supreme Court were:

1. whether the doctors and hospital were subject to the Charter.
2. whether the police's conduct violated section 8 and if so whether it was saved under section 1.
3. if a violation is found whether the evidence could be excluded under section 24(2).

The Court found that the doctor and hospital were not subject to the Charter. It was also found that the police's conduct was in violation of section 8, was not justified under section 1, and that the evidence should be excluded under section 24(2).

== See also ==
- List of Supreme Court of Canada cases (Lamer Court)
