= R v Wong =

- Supreme Court of Canada

Hearing: May 2, 1990 Judgment: November 22, 1990
- Full case name: Santiago Wong v Her Majesty The Queen
- Citations: [1990] 3 SCR 36, 1990 CanLII 56, 60 CCC (3d) 460, 1 CR (4th) 1, 2 CRR (2d) 277, 45 OAC 250
- Docket No.: 20549
- Prior history: The trial judge acquitted the appellant and ruled video surveillance as inadmissible. The Court of Appeal for Ontario allowed the appeal against acquittal and ordered a new trial.

Holding
- The appeal should be dismissed because admission into evidence of the videotape would not bring the administration of justice into disrepute.

Court membership
- Chief Justice: Brian Dickson; Puisne Justices: Antonio Lamer, Bertha Wilson, Gérard La Forest, Claire L'Heureux-Dubé, John Sopinka, Charles Gonthier, Peter Cory, Beverley McLachlin

Reasons given
- Majority: La Forest J., joined by Dickson C.J., L'Heureux-Dubé and Sopinka JJ.
- Concurrence: Lamer C.J., joined by McLachlin J.
- Dissent: Wilson J.
- Gonthier and Cory JJ. took no part in the consideration or decision of the case.

R v Wong, [1990] 3 S.C.R. 36, is a leading decision of the Supreme Court of Canada on the evidence obtained by electronic video surveillance conducted without authorization. The Court held that individuals have a reasonable expectation of privacy in a hotel room. This expectation does not depend on whether those persons were engaging in illegal activities. Therefore, individuals can expect that agents of the state will not engage in warrantless video surveillance. Electronic surveillance without authorization violates Section Eight of the Canadian Charter of Rights and Freedoms. However, for this particular case, the Supreme Court held that the police acted in good faith and had reasonable and probable ground to believe criminal activities were committed. The surveillance without authorization was a result of misunderstanding. Hence, acceptance of the surveillance as evidences will not bring the administration of justice into disrepute under Section Twenty-four of the Canadian Charter of Rights and Freedoms.

== Facts ==
Police installed a video camera without prior judicial authorization and monitored the activities in a hotel room registered to the appellant in the course of an investigation of a "floating" gaming house. They conducted a raid and found Mr. Wong to be in possession of profit lists. They seized gaming paraphernalia and a large sum of money. The trial judge acquitted Mr. Wong of keeping a common gaming house. He held that the video surveillance was a violation of s. 8 of the Canadian Charter of Rights and Freedoms and excluded the evidence thereby obtained under s. 24(2) . On appeal, the Ontario Court of Appeal held that the protection of s. 8 of the Charter was not available as there was no reasonable expectation of privacy, given that 30 to thirty five people had been invited to gamble illegally for high stakes in the room.

== Issues ==
Did Mr. Wong have a reasonable expectation of privacy while in a closed hotel room?

== Ratio ==
The Court held, with Wilson J dissenting, that the appeal should be dismissed. However, the majority disagreed on the reasoning.

=== Judgement of La Forest J ===
Writing for himself, Dickson C.J. and L'Heureux‑Dubé and Sopinka JJ, Justice La Forest held that the degree of privacy reasonably expected in a free society would be seriously diminished by unrestricted video surveillance by agents of the state. There was a reasonable expectation of privacy and a warrantless video search there constituted an unreasonable search and seizure. Whether persons who are the objects of an electronic search have a reasonable expectation of privacy does not depend on whether or not those persons were engaged in illegal activities. The protection of s. 8 of the Charter is meant to shield against warrantless video surveillance and the unauthorized video surveillance offended against the reasonable expectations of privacy protected by that section.

=== Judgment of Lamer CJ ===
Writing for himself and McLachlin J: Chief Justice Lamer held not every unauthorized electronic surveillance carried out by the agents of the state violates s. 8 of the Charter . ′"R. v. Duarte" stands for the proposition that the recording of a private communication, without the consent of all parties thereto, constitutes a search for the purpose of s. 8 . Such a search may be reasonable only where prior judicial authorization has been obtained. Unauthorized surreptitious electronic surveillance will violate s. 8 where the target of the surveillance has a reasonable expectation of privacy. The consideration of whether an individual has a reasonable expectation of privacy can only be decided within the particular factual context of the surveillance. Mr. Wong had no reasonable expectation of privacy as he had invited the public into the hotel room and, accordingly, no search took place within the meaning of s. 8 . The surreptitious video surveillance was not justified by s. 1 of the Charter . However, Mr. Wong did not establish that the admission of the evidence would bring the administration of justice into disrepute for the purposes of s. 24(2) of the Charter . The police acted in good faith and had reasonable and probable grounds to believe that the offence had been committed. The Charter breach stemmed from an entirely reasonable misunderstanding of the law by the police officers who had sought legal advice about the steps that could be taken to obtain evidence they could not otherwise obtain.

=== Judgment of Wilson J ===
Justice Wilson agreed with La Forest J. on the s. 8 violation but dissented on the s.24(2) issue, as she felt the presence of the words "having regard to all the circumstances" in s. 24(2) of the Charter suggests that the context is vital in determining whether evidence obtained in violation of Charter rights should nonetheless be admitted. The videotape evidence existed purely as a result of the violation of s. 8 and was analogous to a confession and quite different from evidence which has an independent existence apart entirely from the Charter violation.

Fair trial considerations favoured the exclusion of the videotape evidence. Police could and should have sought an authorization for a wiretap, at which time they could have put to the authorizing judge their desire to use video surveillance independent from or in addition to audio surveillance. Instead, they proceeded in blatant disregard for Mr. Wong's Charter rights. Their conduct was deliberate and was not based on a reasonable, or indeed any, misunderstanding of the law. The admission of this evidence would bring the administration of justice into disrepute given the nature of the evidence, the gravity of the Charter infringement and the fact the offence with which the appellant was charged did not fall into the more serious category. To extend the principle in Duarte to this case is to ignore completely the words "having regard to all the circumstances" in s. 24(2) .

== See also ==
- List of Supreme Court of Canada cases (Lamer Court)
