= Dobson (Litigation guardian of) v Dobson =

- Supreme Court of Canada

Hearing: December 8, 1998 Judgment: July 9, 1999
- Full case name: Cynthia Dobson v. Ryan Leigh MacLean Dobson by his Litigation Guardian, Gerald M. Price
- Citations: [1999] 2 SCR 753; 1999 CanLII 698 (SCC); (1999), 214 NBR (2d) 201; (1999), 174 DLR (4th) 1
- Prior history: Judgment for the Ryan Leigh MacLean Dobson in the Court of Appeal for New Brunswick.

Holding
- Action cannot be brought against a mother by a child for fetal damages caused by the mother's negligence.

Court membership
- Chief Justice: Antonio Lamer; Puisne Justices: Claire L'Heureux-Dubé, Charles Gonthier, Peter Cory, Beverley McLachlin, Frank Iacobucci, John C. Major, Michel Bastarache, Ian Binnie

Reasons given
- Majority: Cory J, joined by Lamer CJ, L'Heureux-Dubé, Gonthier, Iacobucci and Binnie JJ
- Concurrence: McLachlin
- Dissent: Major, joined by Bastarache

Dobson (Litigation guardian of) v Dobson, [1999] 2 SCR 753 is a landmark decision by the Supreme Court of Canada on a pregnant woman's legal duties in tort law. It was the first time the Supreme Court of Canada had to consider this issue. The majority of the Court found that tort claims cannot be brought against women for negligence toward the fetus during pregnancy.

The case involved one Cynthia Dobson, who in 1993 was driving and got into a car accident in bad weather. Her fetus was supposedly damaged in the accident and was delivered by Caesarean section on the day of the crash, before the expected due date. The child had cerebral palsy. On behalf of the child, his maternal grandfather brought a tort claim against the mother for negligence in driving in order to benefit from the father's insurance policy, which covered damages caused by the negligence of drivers of his motor vehicle.

== Decision ==
The majority decision was written by Peter Cory, who began by emphasizing the uniqueness and importance of pregnancy, saying it "speaks of the mystery of birth and life" and that "the relationship between a pregnant woman and her foetus is unique and innately recognized as one of great and special importance to society." He noted it was usually the case that women care for their fetus, before he turned to address negligence.

Cory noted that the only issue before the Supreme Court was whether such a tort claim could be made: is a pregnant woman liable for negligence? He then turned to cases in which children actually did make successful tort claims for fetal injuries. These included Montreal Tramways Co v Léveillé (1933), in which a child successfully sued for club feet, and the Court had said that otherwise there would be no way to achieve justice for the child. However, in 1999 Cory noted that the action in the earlier case was not against the mother, which was a more "sensitive issue."

The Court then cited Kamloops (City of) v Nielsen (1984) to say the "duty of care" that a mother has for a child is not forced on the mother by courts through public policy. Only a legislature can consider such an issue. Following Kamloops, the Court said a duty of care is recognized if the involved people are closely related, and if the issue does not raise questions about public policy. While fetuses and their mothers have often legally been seen as one person, for the purposes of this case the Court addressed the issue as if they were two people. This satisfied the requirement that the involved people, namely Cynthia Dobson and her fetus, were closely related. As the Court noted, "almost any careless act or omission by a pregnant woman could be expected to have a detrimental impact on foetal development." However, the issue raised questions of public policy; it implicated privacy rights of a pregnant woman and her bodily control. In this sense, it involved consideration that pregnancy may be the "human condition" most "important to society" as it preserves the human race. Moreover, pregnancy symbolizes "fertility and hope." Cory cautioned, however, that despite all this, a woman remains a person with rights. The issue of a pregnant woman's responsibilities ran deep, deeper than that of another person who could be sued for causing damage to someone else's fetus. The pregnant woman's relevant activities would include what "the pregnant woman eats or drinks, and every physical action she takes" and this involves "every waking and sleeping moment, in essence, her entire existence." Whereas a mother has emotional responsibilities for a fetus, adding a tort dimension to this would seriously alter it.

Turning to other countries, Cory found that in the United Kingdom the Parliament had enacted a law granting tort immunity to pregnant women for fetal damages. The only responsibilities were minor ones concerning negligence in driving. Any responsibilities, some in the UK noted, were private and not legal. In the United States, the judges seemed to be split on whether a woman can be held liable for her fetus' injuries. However, the Supreme Court of Illinois in 1988 had noted there were the woman's privacy rights to consider.

Returning to this case, the Court found a woman may negligently cause fetal injuries in many ways, car accidents representing 28% of these cases. Moreover, if a place of work is dangerous, tort responsibilities may affect a woman's right to work, or she might be forced to work for the money. It could also have psychological consequences for the woman, and would lead to poor mother-child relations as the child matures.

Another reason why the issue raised concerns of public policy was that the judicial system would have to define the proper behaviour of a pregnant woman, a so-called "reasonable pregnant woman" test. However, Cory responded that courts should not do this. It raised questions as to whether objective expectations can be made, as some people will have subjective beliefs regarding the pregnant woman. This went back to concerns about privacy rights. Moreover, leaving it to the individual to determine what is reasonable makes sense since the individual is more aware of her economic status and ability to obtain health care, and given the educational and ethnic differences of individual women.

Regarding driving, the New Brunswick Court of Appeal had argued that one could separate responsible driving from personal autonomy. This is what had been done with the 1976 UK law that generally exempted the woman from legal responsibilities, except for driving. However, Cory replied that "With respect, the UK legislative solution to the issue at bar cannot be interpreted as support for the test suggested by the Court of Appeal. To do so presumes that it is appropriate for courts to resolve an extremely sensitive and complex issue of public policy and insurance law." Moreover, just because this was a British law did not mean it was a principle of common law. Additionally, the British law was designed this way so that the tort would be covered by insurance, thus easing a driving pregnant woman's stress in knowing her insurance would help.

Lastly, the Court decided that if the existence of motor vehicle insurance is to be relied upon as the basis for imposing a legal duty of care upon pregnant women, then this solution should be enacted by the legislature. A specific and insurance-dependent rule of tort liability cannot, and should not, be created by the courts.

== Dissent ==
In addressing the policy concerns of the majority in the first leg of the Kamloops test, John Major, in his dissent, asserts that owing a duty of care to the born alive child does not impose additional restrictions on the freedom of action of Ms. Dobson. than she already faced from her duty of care owed to any passengers (e.g. another pregnant woman with a born alive child), or the driver of the car also involved in the accident. It is made clear that during the second branch of the Kamloops test, this argument would not survive where it would add additional duties beyond those already owed to third parties. "To grant a pregnant woman immunity from the reasonably foreseeable consequences of her acts for her born alive child would create a legal distortion as no other plaintiff carries such a one-sided burden, nor any defendant such an advantage."

== Commentary ==
Although this case did not address abortion in Canada, Professor Rand Dyck in a discussion on security of person notes the decision bears some parallels with Tremblay v Daigle (1989). In that case, the Court found a man cannot acquire an injunction to stop his partner from having an abortion. Here, a woman was not legally responsible for fetal injuries.

While the Canadian Charter of Rights and Freedoms applies only to government actions, one scholar cites Dobson as an example of how "the courts have undoubtedly promoted flexible Charter values in private law cases since 1982." Conversely, the Human Rights Program under the Department of Canadian Heritage once suggested that Dobson partly illustrates how the International Covenant on Economic, Social and Cultural Rights influences Canadian law. Specifically, Dobson reflects article 10 of the Covenant, "Protection of the Family, Mother and Child." Other cases said to reflect that article include Augustus v Gosset (1996), Winnipeg Child and Family Services (Northwest Area) v G (D F) (1997), and New Brunswick (Minister of Health and Community Services) v G (J) (1999).

== See also ==
- List of Supreme Court of Canada cases (Lamer Court)
