= Baker v Canada (Minister of Citizenship and Immigration) =

- Supreme Court of Canada

Hearing: November 4, 1998 Judgment: July 9, 1999
- Full case name: Mavis Baker v Minister of Citizenship and Immigration
- Citations: [1999] 2 SCR 817
- Prior history: Judgment for the Minister of Citizenship and Immigration in the Federal Court of Appeal
- Ruling: Appeal allowed.

Holding
- Procedural fairness will have different requirements depending on the nature and importance of the administrative decision.

Court membership
- Chief Justice: Antonio Lamer; Puisne Justices: Claire L'Heureux-Dubé, Charles Gonthier, Peter Cory, Beverley McLachlin, Frank Iacobucci, John C. Major, Michel Bastarache, Ian Binnie

Reasons given
- Majority: L'Heureux-Dube J (paras 1–77), joined by Gonthier, McLachlin, Bastarache and Binnie JJ
- Concurrence: Iacobucci J (paras 78–81), joined by Cory J
- Lamer CJ and Major J took no part in the consideration or decision of the case.

Laws applied
- Pushpanathan v Canada (Minister of Citizenship and Immigration), [1998] 1 SCR 982; Committee for Justice and Liberty v National Energy Board, [1978] 1 SCR 369 (L'Heureux-Dubé); Capital Cities Communications Inc v Canadian Radio-Television Commission, [1978] 2 SCR 141 (Iacobucci)

Baker v Canada (Minister of Citizenship and Immigration), [1999] 2 SCR 817 is a leading Canadian administrative law decision of the Supreme Court of Canada. The Court provided guidance on the standard of judicial review of administrative decisions. The issue was what standard of procedural fairness should be applied when considering the judicial review of the waiver of the requirement that applications for permanent residence be filed from abroad. The case also clarified the need for written reasons in some administrative decisions.

== Background ==
Mavis Baker was a Jamaican woman who lived without status in Canada for 11 years as a domestic worker. During this time she gave birth to four children in Canada. When the government discovered that she was in Canada without status she was ordered deported. She brought an application for permanent residence under section 114(2) of the Immigration Act, 1976. The immigration officer rejected her application without giving reasons. Baker was able to make a request for the immigration officer's notes, and, based on the notes, she applied for judicial review of the decision.

== Finding and disposition ==
The Federal Court rejected the application. The Federal Court of Appeal agreed and held that the evaluation of the application did not need to be founded on the best interests of the child. On appeal, the Supreme Court of Canada reversed this decision. It held that procedural fairness required the decision-maker to consider the human rights of Baker's children. Children's human rights are outlined in the international Convention on the Rights of the Child. The Supreme Court said that decision-makers must be "reasonable". They also found that Ministerial decisions in this case should follow values that are in international human rights law. The disposition in the case was that the matter was returned to the Minister for redetermination by a different immigration officer.

== Reasons of the court ==
Justice L'Heureux-Dubé, for the majority, allowed the appeal. On the issue of determining the content of the duty of fairness, she outlined several factors that should be taken into consideration:

1. the nature of the decision being made and process followed in making it;
2. the nature of the statutory scheme and the term of the statute pursuant to which the body operates;
3. the importance of the decision to the individual or individuals affected;
4. the legitimate expectations of the person challenging the decision;
5. the choices of procedure made by the agency itself.

L'Heureux-Dubé also considered the domestic use of international law in Canada.

=== Procedural fairness issues ===
Baker appealed to the Supreme Court of Canada for review of the administrative decision denying her application for permanent residence on humanitarian and compassionate grounds. One of Baker's arguments was that she was owed a duty of fairness by the administrative decision maker and that this duty of fairness included the right to an oral hearing. The court rejected this argument, ruling that the unrestricted ability to forward written arguments was sufficient to meet the duty of fairness owed to Ms. Baker.

Baker also argued that the duty of fairness owed to her by the Minister included a duty to provide reasons for any decision made. The court looked to English jurisprudence, in which a common law right to reasons in certain circumstances has developed in the case law. The court found that it would be unfair for the Minister not to provide written reasons for refusing an application in a case such as this where the decision has such significance for the individual and where there is a statutory right of review or appeal of the decision. The court allowed some flexibility in what constitutes reasons, and in this case allowed the notes given by the subordinate officer to the decision-maker to be treated as the reasons for the decision.

Baker further argued that the duty of fairness owed her by the Minister meant that the decision-makers should be free from any "reasonable apprehension of bias". The court concurred and found on the facts that there was a "reasonable apprehension of bias" in the case of the immigration officer who wrote the notes on the file that were subsequently considered by the court to be the reason for the decision.

=== Substantive review ===
Baker repudiates the dichotomy which previously existed in the case law between discretionary and non-discretionary decisions. Instead, the court argued that there is great "difficulty in making rigid classifications between discretionary and non-discretionary decisions".

== See also ==
- List of Supreme Court of Canada cases (Lamer Court)
- Pushpanathan v Canada (Minister of Citizenship and Immigration)
