= Weber v Ontario Hydro =

- Supreme Court of Canada

Hearing: 6 December 1994 Judgment: 29 June 1995
- Full case name: Murray Weber v Ontario Hydro
- Citations: [1995] 2 SCR 929
- Docket No.: 23401
- Prior history: APPEAL from Weber v. Ontario Hydro, 1992 CanLII 7499 (30 November 1992)
- Ruling: Appeal dismissed; cross-appeal allowed

Court membership
- Chief Justice: Antonio Lamer; Puisne Justices: Gérard La Forest, Claire L'Heureux-Dubé, John Sopinka, Charles Gonthier, Peter Cory, Beverley McLachlin, Frank Iacobucci, John C. Major

Reasons given
- Majority: McLachlin, joined by L'Heureux-Dubé, Gonthier and Major
- Concur/dissent: Iacobucci, joined by La Forest and Sopinka
- Lamer and Cory took no part in the consideration or decision of the case.

Weber v Ontario Hydro, [1995] 2 S.C.R. 929 is a leading decision of the Supreme Court of Canada where the Court held that a labour arbitration board was a "court of competent jurisdiction" within the meaning of section 24(1) of the Charter, and could grant declarations and damages. Consequently, the board has exclusive jurisdiction over the matter, and so employees cannot bring suits concerning matters under a collective agreement to court.

== Background ==
Murray Weber, an employee of Ontario Hydro, took a leave of absence due to a back injury. Ontario Hydro paid him sick benefits but after a time they became suspicious and hired a private investigator to spy on Weber. The investigators were able to gain access to Weber's home and found evidence showing that he was abusing the sick benefits.

In August 1989, Weber went to the union who then filed a grievance against Ontario Hydro claiming that the use of the private investigator violated the collective agreement.

While the arbitration was underway, Weber brought an action in court against Ontario Hydro for the torts of trespass, nuisance, deceit, and invasion of privacy, and for a violation of his Charter right to security under section 7 and privacy under section 8.

Ontario Hydro argued that the court could not hear Weber's action because the matter was in the jurisdiction of the arbitrator.

The motions judge struck down the action. He found that the action arose from the collective agreement and so the court did not have jurisdiction, moreover, it was a private dispute and so the Charter did not apply. The Court of Appeal upheld the decision, except held that the Charter claim was valid.

The question before the Court was whether the labour arbitrator had jurisdiction to grant remedies for Weber's claims.

== Reasons of the court ==
Justice McLachlin, writing for the majority, held that the labour arbitrator had jurisdiction to grant the remedies and consequently, Weber could not bring an action in court.

McLachlin looked at the wording of the Ontario Labour Relations Act which gave the arbitrator exclusive authority to adjudicate over "all differences between the parties arising from the interpretation, application, administration or alleged violation of the agreement". She held that this meant that the arbitrator had jurisdiction over the subject matter which meant that the arbitrator necessarily had authority over remedies as well. Consequently, the arbitrator was a "court of competent jurisdiction" and had authority over Weber's claims.

== See also ==
- List of Supreme Court of Canada cases (Lamer Court)
