= Professional Institute of the Public Service of Canada v Northwest Territories (Commissioner) =

Supreme Court of Canada decision

- Supreme Court of Canada

Hearing: February 20, 1990 Judgment: August 16, 1990
- Citations: [1990] 2 SCR 367
- Ruling: PIPSC appeal dismissed

Court membership
- Chief Justice: Antonio Lamer; Puisne Justices: Bertha Wilson, Gérard La Forest, Claire L'Heureux-Dubé, John Sopinka, Charles Gonthier, Peter Cory, Beverley McLachlin, William Stevenson

Reasons given
- Majority: Sopinka J
- Concurrence: Dickson CJ
- Concurrence: La Forest J
- Concurrence: L'Heureux-Dubé J
- Dissent: Cory J, joined by Wilson and Gonthier JJ

Laws applied
- Reference Re Public Service Employee Relations Act (Alta), [1987] 1 SCR 313; Public Service Alliance of Canada v Canada, [1987] 1 SCR 424; Retail, Wholesale and Department Store Union v Saskatchewan, [1987] 1 SCR 460

Professional Institute of the Public Service of Canada v Northwest Territories (Commissioner), [1990] 2 SCR 367 is a leading Supreme Court of Canada decision on the freedom of association under section 2(d) of the Canadian Charter of Rights and Freedoms ("Charter").

== Background ==
The Professional Institute of the Public Service of Canada ("PIPSC") was the federal bargaining agent for 32 nurses in the Northwest Territories. On September 1, 1986, the federal government transferred authority over health to the territorial government, requiring the nurses to become employees of the territorial government. To form a collective agreement with the territorial government, the territorial Public Service Act required that the bargaining agent be incorporated by the territory.

The PIPSC attempted to become incorporated within the territory in order to collectively bargain on behalf of the nurses. The territory denied the application and stated there was already a sufficient number of incorporated collective bargaining groups.

The PIPSC applied for a declaration to have section 42(1) of the Public Services Act struck down for violation of freedom of association under section 2(d) of the Charter.

At the Supreme Court of the Northwest Territories, the declaration was allowed, but was overturned on appeal.

The issue before the Supreme Court of Canada was whether section 42(1), which restricted who could engage in collective bargaining, violated section 2(d) of the Charter and whether it was justifiable under section 1.

== Reasons of the court ==
Sopinka J, writing for the majority, held that was no violation of section 2(d). For a law to engage section 2(d), it must have an effect on the existence of the association or an employee's ability to be a member. Sopinka J noted that the activity of collective bargaining itself is not protected by section 2(d), so it would follow that a restriction on which associations were able to collectively bargain was not a violation. There was nothing in the law that would prevent the employees from joining any other collective bargaining group.
