= R v Nova Scotia Pharmaceutical Society =

- Supreme Court of Canada

Hearing: December 4, 1991 Judgment: July 9, 1992
- Full case name: Nova Scotia Pharmaceutical Society, Pharmacy Association of Nova Scotia, Lawtons Drug Stores Limited, William H. Richardson, Empire Drugstores Limited, Woodlawn Pharmacy Limited, Nolan Pharmacy Limited, Christopher D.A. Nolan, Blackburn Holdings Limited, William G. Wilson, Woodside Pharmacy Limited and Frank Forbes v Her Majesty The Queen
- Citations: [1992] 2 S.C.R. 606
- Docket No.: 22473
- Prior history: on appeal from the Nova Scotia Court of Appeal
- Ruling: appeal dismissed

Court membership
- Chief Justice: Antonio Lamer; Puisne Justices: Gérard La Forest, Claire L'Heureux-Dubé, John Sopinka, Charles Gonthier, Peter Cory, Beverley McLachlin, William Stevenson, Frank Iacobucci

Reasons given
- Unanimous reasons by: Gonthier J.

R v Nova Scotia Pharmaceutical Society, [1992] 2 S.C.R. 606 is a leading Supreme Court of Canada decision on section 7 of the Canadian Charter of Rights and Freedoms and the doctrine of vagueness. The Court held that laws can be struck down as a violation of section 7 where they are so vague as to violate fundamental justice.

== Background ==
A number of pharmacies were charged with conspiracy "to prevent or lessen competition" under section 32(1)(c) of the Combines Investigation Act for the sale of prescription drugs and dispensing services prior to June 1986. They challenged the provision on the basis that it violated section 7 of the Charter on account of its vagueness.

At trial, the Supreme Court of Nova Scotia found in favour of the pharmaceutical companies and overturned the conviction. On appeal the court overturned the verdict and found in favour of the Crown.

The issue before the Supreme Court was:

1. whether section 32(1)(c) of the Act infringed s. 7 of the Charter because of vagueness arising from the use of the word "unduly"; and
2. whether section 32(1)(c) infringed section 7 by reason of the mens rea required by the offence.

The Court held that section 32(1)(c) of the Act was sufficiently clear and was not in violation of the Charter. Justice Gonthier wrote for a unanimous Court.

== Reasoning of the court ==
Justice Gonthier observed that the doctrine of vagueness under section 7 was founded in the doctrine of the rule of law. Specifically, "the principles of fair notice to citizens and limitation of enforcement discretion". A law will be in violation of section 7 for vagueness if "it so lacks in precision as not to give sufficient guidance for legal debate." (p. 643)

The requirement of "fair notice" means that there must be awareness of the law. The citizen must have an "understanding that certain conduct is the subject of legal restrictions." The "limitation of law enforcement discretion" is directed at the content of the law, which requires that a law "not be so devoid of precision in its content that a conviction will automatically flow from the decision to prosecute." (p. 636)

The term "legal debate" was intended to reflect and encompass the principles of vagueness in the "fuller context of an analysis of the quality and limits of human knowledge and understanding in the operation of the law." (p. 640) This requires that the law sets out "the boundaries of permissible and non-permissible conduct".

In all the threshold for vagueness is a high one. Gonthier gave a list of factors to consider when determining if a provision is vague:

1. the need for flexibility and the role of courts in interpreting the law;
2. the impossibility of absolute precision, a standard of intelligibility being preferable; and
3. the possibility that a given provision may be susceptible to a number of interpretations which can co-exist.

On the facts, the impugned provision of the Act was found not to be vague. The Court examined the wording of the provision and considered the context of the Act in the area of commercial law, and found that "Parliament has sufficiently delineated the area of risk and the terms of debate to meet the constitutional standard."

== See also ==
- List of Supreme Court of Canada cases (Lamer Court)
