= R v Bartle =

- Supreme Court of Canada

Hearing: 2 and 3 March 1994 Judgment: 29 September 1994
- Full case name: Kenneth Bartle v Her Majesty the Queen
- Citations: [1994] 3 SCR 173
- Docket No.: 23623
- Prior history: Judgment for the Crown in the Court of Appeal for Ontario
- Ruling: Appeal allowed

Holding
- Section 10(b) of the Canadian Charter of Rights and Freedoms places three duties on the police in relation to rights to counsel: (1) the duty to inform a detainee of their rights to counsel; (2) the duty to provide a detainee with a reasonable opportunity to exercise their right; and (3) the duty to hold of questioning until a detainee until that reasonable opportunity has been exercised. The first duty includes advising a detainee of the availability of duty counsel. A detainee must fully understand their rights before they can be waived.

Court membership
- Chief Justice: Antonio Lamer; Puisne Justices: Gérard La Forest, Claire L'Heureux-Dubé, John Sopinka, Charles Gonthier, Peter Cory, Beverley McLachlin, Frank Iacobucci, John C. Major

Reasons given
- Majority: Lamer CJ, joined by Sopinka, Cory, Iacobucci and Major JJ
- Concurrence: La Forest J
- Concurrence: McLachlin J
- Dissent: L'Heureux‑Dubé J
- Dissent: Gonthier J

R v Bartle, [1994] 3 SCR 173 is a leading Supreme Court of Canada decision on the right to retain and instruct counsel under section 10(b) of the Canadian Charter of Rights and Freedoms ("Charter"). The Court held that a police officer is required to hold off on his or her investigation upon arresting an individual until the detainee has been informed of his or her rights and given sufficient information and access to contact a private lawyer or duty counsel. The case applied the earlier Supreme Court of Canada decision R v Brydges. The judgment was released with three other decisions: R v Pozniak, R v Harper, R v Matheson and R v Prosper.

== Background ==
=== Police investigation ===
On 22 June 1991, Kenneth Bartle was arrested for impaired operation of a motor vehicle. The police officer then read the following to Bartle from a pre-printed card:

You have the right to retain and instruct counsel without delay.
You have the right to telephone any lawyer that you wish.
You also have the right to free advice from a Legal Aid lawyer.
If you are charged with an offence, you may apply to the Ontario Legal Aid Plan for legal assistance.

Bartle advised that he understood. The officer did not mention the existence of duty counsel, which could give immediate legal advice, or that there was a 24-hour toll-free number for legal aid.

The officer asked Bartle if he wanted to speak to a lawyer "now", notwithstanding there was no telephone in the area. Bartle advised the officer that he had five or six beers at a baseball game that evening.

Upon arrival at the police station, the officer again asked Bartle if he wished to speak to a lawyer "now". Bartle said no. Bartle then provided two samples of his breath, indicated that he had a blood alcohol content over the legal limit, and was charged accordingly.

=== Trial ===
The trial was held in the Ontario Court of Justice (Provincial Division). Bartle testified he waived his rights to counsel because he did not know whom to call or whom he could get hold of. The trial judge found there was no requirement for the police to advise Bartle of the existence of duty counsel or the toll-free number, and that there was no Charter infringement.

=== Summary conviction appeal ===
The summary conviction appeal was heard in the Ontario Court of Justice (General Division). The appeal judge found there was a requirement for the police to advise Bartle of the existence of duty counsel and the toll-free number, and that there was a Charter infringement. He went on the exclude the breath samples as evidence under section 24(2) of the Charter.

=== Court of Appeal ===
The appeal from the summary conviction appeal was heard in the Court of Appeal for Ontario. The court unanimously found that a detainee is not required to be advised of the existence of duty counsel or the toll-free number unless the circumstances warrant it (i.e., the detainee expresses concern about the availability of duty counsel). Consequently, there was no Charter infringement.

== Reasons of the Court ==
There were two issues before the court: (1) does section 10(b) of the Charter require the police to advise a detainee of the existence of duty counsel; and (2) if so, should the evidence in Bartle's case be excluded under section 24(2) of the Charter?

=== Section 10(b) ===
Lamer CJ wrote the majority decision. The majority found that the proper application of Brydges required the police to advise a detainee in all cases the existence of duty counsel and the toll-free number. Otherwise, a detainee cannot make an informed decision about whether to call a lawyer.

In a concurring opinion, La Forest J agreed with the majority's decision entirely. McLachlin J also wrote a concurring opinion, agreeing with the majority's decision. She also found that Bartle's rights to counsel were infringed because he should have specifically been told he had the right to be told that he had the right to speak to counsel prior to incriminating himself before being charged.

Although disagreeing with the majority on the ultimate issue (see below), Gonthier J agreed with the majority's decision on the scope of rights to counsel.

In a dissenting opinion, L'Heureux-Dubé J disagreed the police were required to always inform a detainee of existence of duty counsel or the toll-free number, since there is no constitutional requirement for such programs to exist in the first place.

=== Section 24(2) ===
Since the majority found that there was an infringement of the Charter, the next issue was whether the evidence should be excluded under section 24(2). In applying the test in R v Collins (which has since been overtaken by the test in R v Grant), the majority found that the evidence should be excluded, as the breath samples were compelled by statute. The majority also found that if the Crown wants to argue that a detainee would have made the same decision notwithstanding a Charter infringement, the Crown has the burden of proving that. The majority ultimately found that a court must not speculate on what a detainee might have done or said.

La Forest J agreed with the majority, although he did not find the case for exclusion overwhelming. McLachlin J also agreed with the majority's decision.

L'Heureux-Dubé J found that even if she agreed with the majority on the first issue, she would not have excluded the breath readings. The breach was not serious, and the public is put at a very high risk due to drinking and driving.

Although Gonthier J agreed with the majority on the first issue, he agreed with L'Heureux-Dubé J's dissenting opinion on whether the evidence should be excluded.

== See also ==
- List of Supreme Court of Canada cases (Lamer Court)
