= New Brunswick Broadcasting Co v Nova Scotia (Speaker of the House of Assembly) =

- Supreme Court of Canada

Hearing: March 2–3, 1992 Judgment: January 21, 1993
- Full case name: Arthur Donahoe in his capacity as the Speaker of the House of Assembly v Canadian Broadcasting Corporation
- Citations: [1993] 1 S.C.R. 319, 1993 CanLII 153 (S.C.C.); (1993), 118 N.S.R. (2d) 181; (1993), 118 N.S.R. (2e) 181; (1993), 100 D.L.R. (4th) 212; (1993), 13 C.R.R. (2d) 1
- Docket No.: 22457
- Prior history: Appeal from a judgment of the Nova Scotia Supreme Court, Appeal Division 1991 CanLII 2529, allowing in part the appellant's appeal from a judgment of Justice Nathanson, granting the respondent's claim for a declaration of a right of access pursuant to s. 2(b) of the Canadian Charter of Rights and Freedoms to televise the proceedings of the House of Assembly.
- Ruling: Appeal allowed

Holding
- Parliamentary privileges are a part of the unwritten convention in the Constitution of Canada. Therefore, the Charter of Rights and Freedoms does not apply to members of the House of Assembly when they exercise their inherent privileges.

Court membership
- Chief Justice: Antonio Lamer; Puisne Justices: Gérard La Forest, Claire L'Heureux-Dubé, John Sopinka, Charles Gonthier, Peter Cory, Beverley McLachlin, William Stevenson, Frank Iacobucci

Reasons given
- Majority: Justice McLachlin, joined by Justices L'Heureux-Dubé, Gonthier, Iacobucci
- Concurrence: Chief Justice Lamer
- Concurrence: Justice La Forest
- Concurrence: Justice Sopinka
- Dissent: Justice Cory
- Justice Stevenson took no part in the consideration or decision of the case.

New Brunswick Broadcasting Co v Nova Scotia (Speaker of the House of Assembly) is a leading Supreme Court of Canada decision wherein the court has ruled that parliamentary privilege is a part of the unwritten convention in the Constitution of Canada. Therefore, the Canadian Charter of Rights and Freedoms does not apply to members of Nova Scotia House of Assembly when they exercise their inherent privileges of refusing strangers from entering the House.

== Background ==
New Brunswick Broadcasting Company, carrying on business under the name of MITV, had made a request to film the proceedings of the Nova Scotia House of Assembly with its own camera or one provided by the speaker. However, the Speaker refused television cameras in the House citing parliamentary privilege. New Brunswick Broadcasting Co. commenced a proceeding in the Supreme Court of Nova Scotia, Trial Division, against the appellant seeking an order "allowing MITV to film the proceedings of the House of Assembly with its own cameras or by the Speaker providing full television coverage to all members of the television media, or otherwise". The Speaker joined issue. The Canadian Broadcasting Corporation was joined as a plaintiff at the corporation's request and MITV subsequently withdrew from the proceedings.

== Courts below ==
Justice Nathanson of the Trial Division granted the plaintiff's claim, and ordered:

1. the plaintiffs had a right of access pursuant to s. 2(b) of the Charter
2. such right of access is limited by the privileges of the House of Assembly, reflected in rules which shall infringe freedom of expression as little as possible
3. the House of Assembly or the Speaker on its behalf shall develop such rules
4. the court will retain jurisdiction to judge the timeliness of the actions of any of the parties and the reasonableness of the rules adopted.
5. the Court reserves the matter of costs

The Speaker appealed to the Supreme Court of Nova Scotia, Appeal Division. In a 3-2 decision, the appeal was dismissed, but the last four paragraphs of the order were struck out.

On appeal to the Supreme Court of Canada, in July 1991 Justice Charles Gonthier certified the following constitutional questions to be addressed:

1. Does the Canadian Charter of Rights and Freedoms apply to the members of the House of Assembly when exercising their privileges as members?
2. If the answer to question 1 is yes, does exercising a privilege so as to refuse access to the media to the public gallery to record and relay to the public proceedings of the House of Assembly by means of their cameras contravene s. 2(b) of the Charter?
3. If the answer to question 2 is yes, is such a refusal a reasonable limit prescribed by law as can be demonstrably justified in a free and democratic society, pursuant to s. 1 of the Charter?

== At the Supreme Court ==
In a 6-2 decision, it was held that the answer to Question 1 was No, and it was unnecessary to answer the other two questions.

Answers to issues posed
| Question | Justice Beverley McLachlin, joined by Justices Claire L'Heureux-Dubé, Charles Gonthier and Frank Iacobucci | Chief Justice Antonio Lamer | Justice Gérard La Forest | Justice John Sopinka | Justice Peter Cory |
|---|---|---|---|---|---|
| Question 1 | No. Also agrees with La Forest's reasons. | No. | Concur with McLachlin. In general agreement with her reasons. | Yes. | Yes. |
| Question 2 | Unnecessary to answer. | Neither necessary nor appropriate to answer. | Concur with McLachlin. | Yes. | Yes. |
| Question 3 | Unnecessary to answer. | Neither necessary nor appropriate to answer. | Concur with McLachlin. | Yes. | No. |
| Disposition | Allow the appeal and set aside the order of the trial judge, as amended by the Court of Appeal of Nova Scotia. | Appeal is allowed. The order of the trial judge, as amended by the Court of Appeal for Nova Scotia, is set aside. | Concur with McLachlin. | Concur with Lamer. | Dismiss the appeal. |

Justice Beverley McLachlin found that, although the "tradition of curial deference" does not cover all activities of a legislative assembly, it includes the privileges of legislative assemblies. This right is necessary to the functioning of that body and should not be set aside lightly. In addition, the majority agrees that the Charter of Rights and Freedoms does not apply to the house of assembly's privilege because the privilege, including the rights to exclude strangers, is part of the Constitution of Canada. The preamble to the Constitution Act, 1867 states that the constitution's intention is to establish "a Constitution similar in Principle to that of the United Kingdom". Thus, parliamentary privilege cannot be negated by another part of the Constitution. Furthermore, the "Constitution of Canada" in section 52(2) of the Constitution Act, 1982 is not meant to be exhaustive, and unwritten convention "can be" part of the constitution.

=== Concurring opinions ===
Justice Gérard La Forest agreed with the majority's argument, subject to the observation that the constitutional status of parliamentary privilege inherits from being part of the colony's constitution (pre-dating the confederation) instead of being part of the United Kingdom's constitution.

Chief Justice Antonio Lamer held that the Court can inquire on the existence, but not the exercise, of parliamentary privilege. He agreed with Justice La Forest's assertion that the privileges enjoyed by Canadian parliament is different from the Houses of Parliament of the United Kingdom. Furthermore, he commented that Section Thirty-two of the Canadian Charter of Rights and Freedoms is not applicable to the action because section Thirty-Two concerns with the "legislation that the provinces have enacted with respect to privileges", not the exercise of it.

Justice John Sopinka argued that the exercise of the historic privilege in issue in this appeal was a pressing and substantial objective, which was to maintain order and decorum and ensure the smooth functioning of the legislative assembly. The present restriction on the number and location of cameras was rationally connected with the objective, and the alleged intrusion on the freedom of the press was not out of proportion to it.

=== Dissenting opinion ===
In dissent, Justice Peter Cory argued that the exercise of privilege falls under Section 32 of the Charter and is subject to court's review. This follows that the ban on television cameras is reviewable by Canadian courts. Justice Cory concluded that the complete ban on cameras is not essentially necessary to the House's operation and "exceeded the jurisdiction inherent in parliamentary privilege." This follows that the infringement of Section 2b of the Charter of Rights and Freedom is not reasonable within the context of Section 1.

== See also ==
- List of Supreme Court of Canada cases (Lamer Court)
- Parliamentary privilege
- Canada (House of Commons) v. Vaid, [2005] 1 S.C.R. 667, 2005 SCC 30
