= R (Canada) v Adams =

R v Adams
- Supreme Court of Canada

Hearing: 1995: October 6; Judgment: 1995: December 21.
- Citations: R. v. Adams, [1995] 4 S.C.R. 707
- Docket No.: 24252

Holding
- Encouraging victims to come forward and complain facilitates the prosecution and conviction of those guilty of sexual offences. Ultimately, the overall objective of the publication ban ...is to favour the suppression of crime and to improve the administration of justice.

Court membership
- Chief Justice: Antonio Lamer; Puisne Justices: Gérard La Forest, Claire L'Heureux-Dubé, John Sopinka, Charles Gonthier, Peter Cory, Beverley McLachlin, Frank Iacobucci, John C. Major

Reasons given
- Unanimous reasons by: The Court

R. v. Adams, [1995] 4 S.C.R. 707, is a decision of the Supreme Court of Canada that addressed the constitutionality and purpose of publication bans in sexual assault trials under section 486 of the Criminal Code. The case arose after a trial judge lifted a mandatory publication ban, prompting the Crown to appeal directly to the Supreme Court. The Court reinstated the publication ban, emphasizing its role in encouraging sexual assault victims to come forward and maintaining public confidence in the administration of justice.

== Background ==
The appeal originated from a decision of the Court of Queen's Bench of Alberta in a sexual assault trial where the trial judge, Justice Feehan, found the key witnesses for both the Crown and the defence to be unreliable. As a result, he acquitted the accused and lifted the mandatory publication ban imposed under section 486 of the Criminal Code.

Justice Feehan justified lifting the ban on policy grounds, stating:

... this woman went into the beer parlor as a predator, and this fellow says he lost $900. I didn't make that as a finding of fact, but he says he lost $900. ... Don't we owe society a duty to tell the next person that goes into that beer parlor for a beer and maybe also looking for a prostitute, that this is a dangerous one[?]

== Decision ==
Justice Sopinka, writing for a unanimous Supreme Court, allowed the Crown's appeal and reinstated the publication ban. The Crown had applied for leave to appeal directly to the Supreme Court under section 40(1) of the Supreme Court Act, R.S.C., 1985, c. S-26. Although the respondent raised the issue of mootness, the Court concluded that the matter remained justiciable and, even if moot, warranted the Court's attention.

In reaching its decision, the Court reaffirmed the constitutionality and necessity of mandatory publication bans in sexual offence cases. Justice Sopinka quoted with approval from Justice Lamer in Canadian Newspapers Co. v. Canada (Attorney General):

Encouraging victims to come forward and complain facilitates the prosecution and conviction of those guilty of sexual offences. Ultimately, the overall objective of the publication ban ... is to favour the suppression of crime and to improve the administration of justice... A discretionary ban is not an option as it is not effective in attaining Parliament's pressing goal.
