= R v Latimer (1997) =

Supreme Court of Canada case on right to counsel

- Supreme Court of Canada

Hearing: November 27, 1996 Judgment: February 6, 1997
- Full case name: Robert W Latimer v Her Majesty The Queen
- Citations: [1997] 1 SCR 217, 1997 CanLII 405, 142 DLR (4th) 577, [1997] 2 WWR 525, 112 CCC (3d) 193, 41 CRR (2d) 281, 4 CR (5th) 1, 152 Sask R 1
- Docket No.: 24818
- Prior history: Judgment for the Crown in the Court of Appeal for Saskatchewan
- Ruling: Conviction overturned, new trial ordered

Holding
- Section 10(a) of the Charter requires that one be made aware of the seriousness of the situation; Section 10(b) is not breached when one is not told of a means of accessing duty counsel that is not available at the time

Court membership
- Chief Justice: Antonio Lamer; Puisne Justices: Gérard La Forest, Claire L'Heureux-Dubé, John Sopinka, Charles Gonthier, Peter Cory, Beverley McLachlin, Frank Iacobucci, John C. Major

Reasons given
- Unanimous reasons by: Lamer CJ

R v Latimer, [1997] 1 SCR 217, was a decision by the Supreme Court of Canada in the controversial case of Robert Latimer, a Saskatchewan farmer convicted of murdering his disabled daughter Tracy. The case involved consideration of arbitrary detention under section 9 of the Canadian Charter of Rights and Freedoms and rights to an explanation for detention and rights to counsel under section 10. The Supreme Court ultimately overturned Latimer's conviction due to the Crown's improper actions at the jury selection stage. As a result, the decision was the first given by the Supreme Court in the Latimer case, the second being R v Latimer on cruel and unusual punishment under section 12 of the Charter.

== Background ==
Latimer, who had poisoned his 12-year-old quadriplegic daughter with carbon monoxide in 1993, became the target of the police's suspicion after Tracy's autopsy. The police then visited Latimer's farm and detained him. The police had said they wanted to talk with Mr. Latimer, and he got into the car with them. An officer then told Latimer he was in a serious situation, he was being detained due to Tracy's death, and that Latimer had a right to counsel and legal aid. Latimer replied that he understood but declined to contact a lawyer immediately. He also wanted to put on different clothes, and the police let him, but they told him they would walk with him into the house as he was now in their custody. During the questioning, the police told Latimer once again that he had rights to counsel and a right to silence, and he declined to ask for a lawyer. After an officer said he was convinced Latimer had killed his daughter, Latimer confessed. He was then charged with murder, after writing a confession that he was told could lead to a murder charge.

When the jury was being selected, the Crown counsel and Royal Canadian Mounted Police intervened to query candidates for the jury on their positions regarding controversial matters such as abortion and euthanasia (matters related to Tracy's death, which Latimer claimed was a mercy killing). Some of candidates who were queried ultimately ended up on the jury. Latimer was found guilty, and the Saskatchewan Court of Appeal upheld the trial decision. It was only after the Court of Appeal's decision that the Crown's actions during jury selection came to light.

== Decision ==
The decision was written by Chief Justice Antonio Lamer, who emphasized at the outset that his decision would not deal with the ethical controversies surrounding what Latimer claimed to have been a mercy killing. Latimer also claimed his detention was arbitrary and therefore breached section 9 of the Charter. The Court decided the detention was not arbitrary, as it was carried out because it seemed likely that Latimer was guilty. These were valid grounds for an arrest; the detention fit the definition of a proper arrest even though the police never called it one. The description of the incident as a detention, the police making it clear that he was in their custody by walking him into the house so he could put on different clothes, and Latimer's acceptance that the police were in control were enough for Latimer to understand he was being arrested.

The Court then turned to whether the police's decision not to tell Mr. Latimer he was being arrested and could face a murder charge breached section 10(a) of the Charter. This section states one must be "informed promptly of the reasons" for detention or arrest. The Court found section 10(a) was not infringed. Section 10(a) is meant to ensure those arrested or detained are aware of the gravity of the situation. Latimer argued that since the police did not call the detention an arrest, he was not fully aware of how serious the trouble he was in was. He also claimed this was the reason why he had declined to talk to a lawyer. Again, the Court argued the words used did not matter, but rather how the suspect can interpret the situation. Latimer could be expected to understand the seriousness of the situation since he was told he was being detained in connection with Tracy's death. The police had explicitly said the situation was serious, and had told him of rights one has when being arrested.

Finally, the case involved section 10(b), the right "to retain and instruct counsel without delay and to be informed of that right". The Court noted it had found in R v Bartle that rights to be informed that one may seek counsel included rights to be told of duty counsel and how to obtain it; i.e., through a free telephone call. Although Latimer was told that legal aid existed, he was not told that he could make a free telephone call and obtain advice from duty counsel right away. Latimer argued this contradicted Bartle. However, Saskatchewan happened to have different hours during which one could make a free telephone call to directly obtain duty counsel. The arrest occurred at a time when it was not available; therefore the right established in Bartle was inapplicable in this case, as it would have been of no use.

Still, the Supreme Court ordered a new trial. As the Court wrote, the Crown counsel's actions during jury selection "were nothing short of a flagrant abuse of process and interference with the administration of justice". The justice system demanded justice and transparency, and the trial was lacking in this regard.
