= Newfoundland Telephone Co v Newfoundland (Board of Commissioners of Public Utilities) =

- Supreme Court of Canada

Hearing: November 7, 1991 Judgment: March 5, 1992
- Full case name: Newfoundland Telephone Company Limited v. The Board of Commissioners of Public Utilities
- Citations: [1992] 1 SCR 623, 89 DLR (4th) 289, 95 Nfld & PEIR 271, 1992 CanLII 84
- Docket No.: 22060
- Prior history: On appeal from the Court of Appeal for Newfoundland
- Ruling: Appeal allowed

Court membership
- Chief Justice: Antonio Lamer; Puisne Justices: Gérard La Forest, Claire L'Heureux-Dubé, John Sopinka, Charles Gonthier, Peter Cory, Beverley McLachlin, William Stevenson, Frank Iacobucci

Reasons given
- Unanimous reasons by: Cory J.
- Lamer C.J.C. and Stevenson J. took no part in the consideration or decision of the case.

Laws applied
- Public Utilities Act, RSN 1970, c 322

Newfoundland Telephone Co v Newfoundland (Board of Commissioners of Public Utilities), [1992] 1 SCR 623 is a Canadian administrative law case decided by the Supreme Court of Canada concerning the reasonable apprehension of bias.

The Court held that the standard of bias may vary depending on the function of the administrative body. Those bodies that are primarily adjudicative in nature will be held to a stricter standard than administrative boards whose roles resemble legislatures.

== Background ==
In 1988, the Newfoundland Board of Commissioners of Public Utilities held a public hearing before five of its commissioners to evaluate the executive pay and benefits package of the Newfoundland Telephone Company.

One of the commissioners, Andy Wells, a councillor for St. John's City Council, made comments to the press describing the executive benefits package as "ludicrous" and "unconscionable" before the hearings began. He gave a series of interviews discussing his opposition to further pay and pension increases.

The Newfoundland Telephone Co. objected to the participation of Wells, claiming that his statements created a reasonable apprehension of bias. However, the Board found that they could not remove one of its own members, and rejected their submissions.

Following the proceedings, Wells continued to speak to the press, making clear his opposition to the executive salaries in question.

On August 3, 1989, the Board issued its decision (3–2 in which Wells was part of the majority), which disapproved of an "enhanced pension plan", ordered a refund to customers for inappropriate executive expenses, but did not make any order with respect to individual executive salaries.

Newfoundland Telephone Co. appealed the order to the Newfoundland Court of Appeal, claiming that the Board's orders were void because Wells' statements to the press showed a reasonable apprehension of bias. The Court of Appeal decided in favour of the Board, but the decision was further appealed to the Supreme Court.

== Opinion of the Court ==
The unanimous Court held that Wells' statements during and after the hearings showed a reasonable apprehension of bias, rendering the decision void.

In reaching this decision, the Court noted that the duty of fairness applied to all administrative bodies, but "the extent of that duty will depend upon the nature and the function of the particular tribunal."

Cory J, writing for the court, described how the duty of fairness applied to the spectrum of administrative bodies.

Those that are primarily adjudicative in their functions will be expected to comply with the standard applicable to courts: there must be no reasonable apprehension of bias with regard to their decision. At the other end of the scale are boards with popularly elected members where the standard will be much more lenient. In such circumstances, a reasonable apprehension of bias occurs if a board member pre‑judges the matter to such an extent that any representations to the contrary would be futile. Administrative boards that deal with matters of policy will be closely comparable to the boards composed of elected members. For those boards, a strict application of a reasonable apprehension of bias as a test might undermine the very role which has been entrusted to them by the legislature.

The Public Utilities Board in question was found to be more legislative in nature, dealing primarily with policy issues. Thus, it applied an "open mind" test which required the party alleging bias to "establish that there is a prejudgment of the matter ... to the extent that any representations at variance with the view ... would be futile."

With respect to Wells' comments before the hearings began, the court found that he did not exhibit a closed mind. On the other hand, a higher standard was necessary once the hearings began. They found that Wells' statements to the press during the hearings "taken together, give a clear indication that not only was there a reasonable apprehension of bias but that Mr. Wells had demonstrated that he had a closed mind on the subject."

As a consequence of the Court's findings of bias, the orders made by the Board were declared void. The Court definitively stated that once there was a finding of bias, the decision made by the administrative body could not stand:

A decision of a tribunal which denied the parties a fair hearing cannot be simply voidable and rendered valid as a result of the subsequent decision of the tribunal. The damage created by apprehension of bias cannot be remedied. The hearing, and any subsequent order resulting from it, must be void.
