= Pearlman v Manitoba Law Society Judicial Committee =

Judgement of the Supreme Court of Canada

- Supreme Court of Canada

Hearing: May 7, 1991 Judgment: September 26, 1991
- Citations: 1991 CanLII 26 (SCC), [1991] 2 SCR 869
- Docket No.: 21671

Court membership
- Chief Justice: Antonio Lamer; Puisne Justices: Gérard La Forest, Claire L'Heureux-Dubé, John Sopinka, Charles Gonthier, Peter Cory, Beverley McLachlin, William Stevenson, Frank Iacobucci

Reasons given
- Unanimous reasons by: Iacobucci J.

Pearlman v Manitoba Law Society Judicial Committee, [1991] 2 SCR 869, is a leading decision of the Supreme Court of Canada on section 7 of the Canadian Charter of Rights and Freedoms.

== Background ==
David Pearlman was a Manitoba lawyer who was disciplined by the Law Society for three acts of professional misconduct under section 52(4) of the Law Society Act. Pearlman sought a prohibition against the proceedings of the Law Society on the basis that it violated his right to be tried within a reasonable time under section 11(b) of the Charter, it was contrary to natural justice as the Society had pecuniary interest in his guilt, and that the committee was biased against him.

Pearlman's arguments were dismissed. He appealed, arguing a violation of his section 7 rights.

The issues before the Supreme Court were:

1. Whether section 52(4) of the Manitoba Law Society Act violated section 7 of the Charter.
2. If so, whether the violation was justifiable under section 1 of the Charter.

== Opinion of the Court ==
Justice Iacobucci, writing for a unanimous Court, dismissed Pearlman's appeal. He found that there was no violation of section 7 of the Charter.
