= R v Jorgensen =

- Supreme Court of Canada

Hearing: February 21, 1995 Judgment: November 16, 1995
- Full case name: Randy Jorgensen and 913719 Ontario Limited v Her Majesty The Queen
- Citations: [1995] 4 SCR 55, 129 DLR (4th) 510, 1995 CanLII 85
- Docket No.: 23787
- Prior history: Appealed from the Ontario Court of Appeal, R. v. Jorgensen (1993), 86 CCC (3d) 245 (Ont CA), R. v. Jorgensen, [1992] OJ No 2889 (Ont Prov Div)

Court membership
- Chief Justice: Antonio Lamer; Puisne Justices: Gérard La Forest, Claire L'Heureux-Dubé, John Sopinka, Charles Gonthier, Peter Cory, Beverley McLachlin, Frank Iacobucci, John C. Major

Reasons given
- Unanimous reasons by: Sopinka J.
- Concurrence: Lamer C.J.

Laws applied
- Criminal Code, s. 163

R v Jorgensen, [1995] 4 S.C.R. 55 is a Supreme Court of Canada decision on the knowledge requirement for criminal offences. The Court held that the offence of "knowingly" selling obscene materials requires that the accused be aware that the dominant characteristic of the material was the exploitation of sex and that he knew of the specific acts which made material obscene. Where the accused has a suspicion of the dominant characteristics or specific acts of the material but decided not to make any further inquiries then the accused will be deemed to have known of the material's content. This decision confirms much of what was held in the earlier case of R. v. Sansregret.

== Background ==
Jorgensen was the owner of an adult video store in Ontario. Undercover police officers purchased several videos from his store, several of which depicted explicit sexual scenes coupled with violence. All of the videos in question had been approved by the Ontario Film Review Board (OFRB). Nonetheless, Jorgensen was charged with eight counts of "knowingly" selling obscene material "without lawful justification or excuse" contrary to s. 163(2)(a) of the Criminal Code.

The trial judge found three of the videos to be "obscene" under s. 163(8), and the accused was convicted. The decision was upheld at the Ontario Court of Appeal.

== Opinion of the Court ==
The Court unanimously overturned the conviction and granted the appeal. Justice Sopinka, writing for the majority, held that to prove the mens rea of the offense, "the Crown must prove knowledge on the part of an accused charged with an offence under s. 163(2)(a), not only that he accused was aware that the subject matter had as its dominant characteristic the exploitation of sex but that the accused knew of the presence of the ingredients of the subject matter which as a matter of law rendered the exploitation of sex undue".

The court acquitted Jorgensen because there was no evidence indicating that he had any knowledge of the content of the videos beyond the fact that they were sex films and may have been exploitive in nature.

== Concurrence ==
Chief Justice Lamer, speaking for himself, agreed with the majority's ruling, but went further to consider the defence of officially induced error. He recognized that although mistake of law is no excuse, the strict application of the doctrine could cause injustice:

Officially induced error of law exists as an exception to the rule that ignorance of the law does not excuse. As several of the cases where this rule has been discussed note, the complexity of contemporary regulation makes the assumption that a responsible citizen will have a comprehensive knowledge of the law unreasonable. This complexity, however, does not justify rejecting a rule which encourages a responsible citizenry, encourages government to publicize enactments, and is an essential foundation to the rule of law. Rather, extensive regulation is one motive for creating a limited exception to the rule that ignorantia juris neminem excusat. (Jorgensen at para. 25)

After considering a number of academic sources and the developing Canadian jurisprudence, Lamer C.J.C. proposed that officially induced error be recognized in Canada as an excuse, operating similarly to the excuse of entrapment, which if successful would result in a stay of proceedings rather than acquittal. He listed six essential elements of the defence:

1. The error was one of law or mixed law and fact
2. The accused considered the legal consequences of her actions
3. The advice obtained came from an appropriate official
4. The advice was reasonable in the circumstances
5. The advice obtained must be erroneous
6. The accused must demonstrate reliance on the official advice

On the facts of the case, Lamer C.J.C. agreed with the acquittal by the majority, but would also have excused Jorgensen based on the officially induced error had the Crown proved its case. He found that Jorgensen met all six criteria. Most importantly, he found that Jorgensen had properly considered the legal consequences of his actions and that the OFRB was an appropriate official body for determining whether a film was legally allowed or not.

== Aftermath ==
Although Chief Justice Lamer's consideration of officially induced error was not taken up by the majority of the court, the doctrine was adopted by a number of provincial courts in the subsequent years. In 2006, the Supreme Court of Canada unanimously recognized this doctrine in Levis (City) v. Tetreault; Levis (City) v 2629-4470 Quebec Inc., 2006 SCC 12, [2006] 1 SCR 4.

== See also ==
- List of Supreme Court of Canada cases (Lamer Court)
