= United Food and Commercial Workers, Local 1518 v KMart Canada Ltd =

Leading Supreme Court of Canada decision

- Supreme Court of Canada

Hearing: 15–16 February 1999 Judgment: 9 September 1999
- Full case name: United Food and Commercial Workers, Local 1518 v KMart Canada Ltd and the Labour Relations Board of British Columbia
- Citations: [1999] 2 SCR 1083
- Docket No.: 26209

Court membership
- Chief Justice: Antonio Lamer; Puisne Justices: Claire L'Heureux-Dubé, Charles Gonthier, Peter Cory, Beverley McLachlin, Frank Iacobucci, John C. Major, Michel Bastarache, Ian Binnie

Reasons given
- Unanimous reasons by: The Court
- McLachlin and Bastarache did not participate in the final disposition of the judgment.

United Food and Commercial Workers, Local 1518 v KMart Canada Ltd, [1999] 2 SCR 1083 is a leading Supreme Court of Canada decision on freedom of expression under section 2(b) of the Canadian Charter of Rights and Freedoms. The court struck down a provision in the Labour Relations Code of British Columbia, which prohibited strikers from distributing fliers outside of their primary picketing area.

The court unanimously held that the provision, which was part of a prohibition on secondary picketing, clearly violated the freedom of expression. The violation could not be saved as the purpose of the prohibition, which was to limit the disruption of those who were not involved in the dispute, was not proportional to the prohibition. Handing out leaflets is a traditional means for underfunded groups to get their message to the public and without it they would have no reasonable alternatives.

In reversing this aspect of the laws against secondary picketing, the ruling represented a major shift in picketing practices and part of a post-Charter trend in favour of labour. It was also notable as the first time that the Supreme Court of Canada referred to the Internet in a decision.

== See also ==
- List of Supreme Court of Canada cases (Lamer Court)
