= Schachter v Canada =

Judgement of the Supreme Court of Canada

- Supreme Court of Canada

Hearing: December 12, 1991 Judgment: July 9, 1992
- Citations: 1992 CanLII 74 (SCC), [1992] 2 SCR 679

Court membership
- Chief Justice: Antonio Lamer; Puisne Justices: Gérard La Forest, Claire L'Heureux-Dubé, John Sopinka, Charles Gonthier, Peter Cory, Beverley McLachlin, William Stevenson, Frank Iacobucci

Reasons given

Schachter v. Canada [1992] 2 S.C.R. 679 is the leading Supreme Court of Canada (SCC) decision on the remedy provisions in sections 24(1) of the Charter of Rights and Freedoms and 52(1) of the Constitution Act, 1982. The SCC provides a list of remedies available under each section.

Under section 52(1), the impugned law may be subject to any number of remedies: the law may be struck down completely, it may be suspended until remedied by the legislature, it may be read down to avoid the violation, an omission may be read into the law, or the impugned provision may be severed.

Under section 24(1), the victim of the impugned law may apply for either a constitutional exemption, an injunction, or damages.

== See also ==
- List of Supreme Court of Canada cases (Lamer Court)
