= R v Stinchcombe =

- Supreme Court of Canada

Hearing: May 2, 1991 Judgment: November 7, 1991
- Full case name: William B Stinchcombe v Her Majesty The Queen
- Citations: [1991] 3 S.C.R. 326
- Ruling: Appeal allowed, new trial ordered

Court membership
- Chief Justice: Antonio Lamer; Puisne Justices: Gérard La Forest, Claire L'Heureux-Dubé, John Sopinka, Charles Gonthier, Peter Cory, Beverley McLachlin, William Stevenson, Frank Iacobucci

Reasons given
- Unanimous reasons by: Sopinka J.

R v Stinchcombe, [1991] 3 S.C.R. 326 is a landmark Supreme Court of Canada decision on the disclosure of evidence in a trial and is considered by most to be one of the most significant criminal law cases of the decade. The Court found that the Crown had a duty to provide the defence with all evidence that could possibly be relevant to the case, regardless of whether the Crown plans to call that evidence at trial or not, or whether it helps or hurts the Crown's case. This case put to rest the long-standing issue of whether the Crown could purposely deny the defence evidence that the Crown found would be harmful to their case.

== Background ==
William Stinchcombe, a lawyer, was charged with theft and fraud. One of the Crown's witnesses, a former secretary of Stinchcombe's, had given evidence at the preliminary inquiry that supported the defence's position. Later a statement was taken from her by an RCMP officer, however, at trial the defence was denied access to the contents of the statement. When the Crown decided not to use the statement, the defence made a request for it. The judge refused to provide it and the accused was eventually convicted.

== Reasons of the court ==
Justice Sopinka, writing for a unanimous Court, held that the judge was wrong in refusing the application by the defence, as the Crown was under a duty to disclose all evidence.

Crown has a duty to disclose but crown only has a duty to disclose critical evidence that they believe will assist the defence. If they believe it will not help the case the crown are not obligated to disclose as CJ Mclachlin stated in R v Kennedy.

"The Crown has a legal duty to disclose all relevant information to the defence. The fruits of the investigation which are in its possession are not the property of the Crown for use in securing a conviction but the property of the public to be used to ensure that justice is done."

The duty, wrote Sopinka, is derived from the right of an accused to make full answer and defence which has been entrenched under section 7 of the Charter. This duty, however, is still subject to rules of privilege.

== See also ==
- List of Supreme Court of Canada cases (Lamer Court)
