= R v Lucas =

- Supreme Court of Canada

Hearing: October 15, 1997 Judgment: April 2, 1998
- Full case name: John David Lucas and Johanna Erna Lucas v Her Majesty The Queen
- Citations: [1998] 1 SCR 439
- Docket No.: 25177
- Ruling: Appeal dismissed

Court membership
- Chief Justice: Antonio Lamer; Puisne Justices: Claire L'Heureux-Dubé, John Sopinka, Charles Gonthier, Peter Cory, Beverley McLachlin, Frank Iacobucci, John C. Major, Michel Bastarache

Reasons given
- Majority: Cory J., joined by Lamer C.J. and Gonthier, Iacobucci and Bastarache JJ.
- Concurrence: L’Heureux-Dubé J.
- Concur/dissent: Major J. and McLachlin J.

Laws applied
- Canadian Charter of Rights and Freedoms; Criminal Code, s 300.

R v Lucas is the leading Supreme Court of Canada decision on the criminal offence of defamatory libel. The Court held that the Criminal Code offence of defamatory libel infringed the constitutional protection of freedom of expression under Section 2(b) of the Canadian Charter of Rights and Freedoms, but the offence was a reasonable limit prescribed by law under Section 1 of the Charter.

== Background ==
A police investigation into a child sexual abuse case had resulted in charges against a number of people. Charges for four of them were stayed. These four went to see John Lucas, a prisoners' rights activist, for help with dealing with the effect the charges have had on their lives. Together they developed a theory that one of the police officers in the investigation had been complicit in the sexual abuse and had allowed the four to be charged.

They picketed the provincial court house and the police station. Lucas held signs that said: "Did [the police officer] help/or take part in the rape & sodomy of an 8 year old. The ... papers prove [the officer] allowed his witness to rape"; and "The papers prove [the officer] allowed the false arrest & detention of Mrs. Lucas, with a falsified information".

Lucas was charged under section 300 of the Criminal Code. The provision required that the accused knew the statement to be false and knew it would expose the person to hatred, contempt, or ridicule.

The issue before the Court was whether the Criminal Code provision violated the right to freedom of expression.

== Reasons of the court ==
Justice Cory, for the majority of the Court, held that the provision infringed the right to expression but was saved under section 1 of the Charter. He stated that protecting reputation from false attacks was a justifiable purpose of the law.

Justice McLachlin wrote a separate concurring opinion but added that she was concerned that Cory's comments about the value of the statements would "lower the bar of justification from the outset of the s. 1 analysis".

== See also ==
- List of Supreme Court of Canada cases (Lamer Court)
