= R v Martineau =

1990 Supreme Court of Canada case

- Supreme Court of Canada

Hearing: March 26, 1990 Judgment: September 13, 1990
- Full case name: Her Majesty The Queen v Roderick Russell Martineau
- Citations: [1990] 2 SCR 633
- Prior history: -

Court membership
- Chief Justice: Antonio Lamer; Puisne Justices: Bertha Wilson, Gérard La Forest, Claire L'Heureux-Dubé, John Sopinka, Charles Gonthier, Peter Cory, Beverley McLachlin, William Stevenson

Reasons given
- Majority: Lamer CJ, joined by Dickson CJ and Wilson, Gonthier, and Cory JJ
- Concurrence: Sopinka J
- Dissent: L'Heureux-Dubé J

R v Martineau, [1990] 2 SCR 633 is a leading Supreme Court of Canada case on the mens rea requirement for murder.

== Background ==
One evening in February 1985, Patrick Tremblay and 15-year-old Mr. Martineau set out to rob a trailer owned by the McLean family in Valleyview, Alberta. Martineau was armed with a pellet gun and Tremblay was armed with a rifle. Martineau was under the impression they were going to commit only breaking and entering and that no one would be killed. However, during the robbery, Tremblay shot and killed Mr. and Mrs. McLean.

Martineau was charged with second degree murder under section 213(a) and (d) of the Criminal Code (now section 230(a) and (d)) for both deaths (under section 21(1) and (2)) and was transferred to adult court.

At trial, Martineau was convicted. On appeal, the Alberta Court of Appeal overturned the decision, holding that section 213(a) violated section 7 and section 11(d) of the Canadian Charter of Rights and Freedoms ("Charter").

The issue before the Supreme Court was whether the appeal court was correct in holding section 213(a) as a violation of sections 7 and 11(d) of the Charter.

== Ruling ==
The Supreme Court upheld the ruling of the Appeal Court, holding that section 213(a) violated the Charter and could not be saved under section 1.

=== Majority ===
The Majority was written by Lamer CJC with Dickson CJC, Wilson, Gonthier and Cory JJ concurring.

Section 213(a) is known as the "constructive murder" provision of the Criminal Code. Section 213(a) defined culpable homicide as murder if a person causes the death of another human while committing specific indictable offences, such as breaking and entering. One could be charged with murder under section 213(a) despite having neither an intent to kill nor the subjective knowledge that death might ensue from one's actions. That was in contrast to the other murder provisions in the Code, which require a subjective intent and foresight for a conviction.

Section 213(a) of the Code violated both sections 7 and 11(d) of the Charter. Specifically, it violated the principle of fundamental justice that an appropriate mens rea must be proven by the Crown. Furthermore, the appropriate level of mens rea should be correlated to the severity of the punishment and the social stigma stemming from conviction. Murder is a major indictable offence: both the punishment and stigma stemming from conviction are severe. They were the case so the state must show subjective foresight and intent to prove the offence. However, as stated above, such a requirement was absent from section 213(a). Thus, the violation was not justifiable under section 1 of the Charter because it failed the proportionality test.

=== Dissent ===
L'Heureux-Dubé J, alone, dissented. She held that section 213(a) did not violate either section of the Charter. According to her, subjective foresight of death for the offence of murder was not a principle of fundamental justice.

== Comments ==
The judgment cites two Chief Justices. That is because Dickson was Chief Justice at the time of the hearing but retired before the judgment and was replaced by Lamer, who wrote the decision as Chief Justice.

== See also ==
- List of Supreme Court of Canada cases (Lamer Court)
