= Winko v British Columbia (Forensic Psychiatric Institute) =

- Supreme Court of Canada

Hearing: June 15, 16, 1998 Judgment: June 17, 1999
- Citations: [1999] 2 S.C.R. 625
- Docket No.: 25856
- Ruling: Winko appeal dismissed

Court membership
- Chief Justice: Antonio Lamer; Puisne Justices: Claire L'Heureux-Dubé, Charles Gonthier, Peter Cory, Beverley McLachlin, Frank Iacobucci, John C. Major, Michel Bastarache, Ian Binnie

Reasons given
- Majority: McLachlin J., joined by Lamer C.J. and Cory, Iacobucci, Major, Bastarache and Binnie JJ.:
- Concurrence: Gonthier J., joined by L'Heureux-Dubé J.

Winko v British Columbia (Forensic Psychiatric Institute), [1999] 2 S.C.R. 625 is a Supreme Court of Canada decision on constitutionality of the mental health laws in the Criminal Code under section 7 and section 15 of the Canadian Charter of Rights and Freedoms.

== Background ==
Joseph Winko lived in Vancouver and suffered from a mental illness which included hearing voices. In 1983, he was arrested for attacking pedestrians with a knife and charged with aggravated assault, assault with a weapon, and possession of a weapon for purposes dangerous to the public peace.

At trial he was found "not criminally responsible" and was institutionalized at the Forensic Psychiatric Institute. In 1995, the institute's review board directed Winko to be given a conditional discharge. Winko appealed the ruling, asking instead for absolute discharge.

The issue before the Supreme Court was whether section 672.54 of the Criminal Code which granted the review board the power to give discharges was a violation of section 7 and 15 of the Charter.

The majority of the Court held that the Criminal Code provision did not violate the Charter.

== Opinion of the Court ==
Justice McLachlin, writing for the majority of the Court, dismissed the appeal. She held that the provision was not overly vague, overbroad, or imposed an improper onus and so did not violate section 7 of the Charter. She also found that the provision gave differential treatment based on an enumerated ground under section 15, however, the distinction did not constitute discrimination as the treatment reflected the needs of the individuals by attempting to treat them.

== See also ==
- List of Supreme Court of Canada cases (Lamer Court)
