= R v Park =

- Supreme Court of Canada

Hearing: December 7, 1994 Judgment: June 22, 1995
- Full case name: Her Majesty The Queen v Darryl Gordon Park
- Citations: [1995] 2 S.C.R. 836
- Docket No.: 23876
- Prior history: Judgment for the defendant in the Court of Appeal for Alberta.
- Ruling: Crown's appeal allowed, conviction restored.

Court membership
- Chief Justice: Antonio Lamer; Puisne Justices: Gérard La Forest, Claire L'Heureux-Dubé, John Sopinka, Charles Gonthier, Peter Cory, Beverley McLachlin, Frank Iacobucci, John C. Major

Reasons given
- Majority: L'Heureux‑Dubé J.
- Concurrence: Lamer C.J., joined by La Forest, Gonthier, Cory and McLachlin JJ.
- Concurrence: Sopinka J.
- Concurrence: Iacobucci J., joined by Cory and Major JJ.

R v Park [1995] 2 S.C.R. 836, is a Supreme Court of Canada case dealing with the mistaken belief defence – i.e. that the accused had an honest but mistaken belief that he had consent to engage in sexual relations with the complainant – and the role of the Canadian Charter of Rights and Freedoms in relation to sexual assault.

== Facts ==
The accused was charged with sexual assault. Two weeks before the incident, the complainant and the accused had dated for the first time. Park testified that at her apartment they became intimate; fondled one another's private parts and talked of sex and birth control; she masturbated him to ejaculation. She maintains that they only kissed and talked of birth control. She stated she was a born again Christian and did not believe in premarital sex and thus claimed there was no consensual sexual activity.

On the day of the incident, the accused called the complainant early in the morning; she agreed that he could come over. He arrived shortly thereafter and she greeted him at the door with a kiss on the cheek, wearing only her bathrobe. She claimed that, a few minutes later, he drew her to him and pushed her onto the bed. He was strong and while she resisted actively he could not be stopped. At that point, feeling his weight on her, she flashbacked to a previous traumatic experience. She went into "shock". His pulling his penis out of her and ejaculating on her stomach was the next thing she remembered. The accused had a very different story. He testified that she actively participated and when things got "hot", he prematurely ejaculated on her stomach. He denied that intercourse took place.

A medical report from the examination of the complainant indicated redness on the inner labia, consistent with consensual or non-consensual intercourse.

At trial, the accused's defence was that either (1) that she consented to the sexual activity or, (2) alternatively, that he had an honest but mistaken belief that she was consenting. The trial judge refused to put the mistaken belief defence to the jury, finding there was no "air of reality" to it, and concluding that the issue was simply one of "consent or no consent".

The accused was convicted. On appeal, the majority of the Court of Appeal set aside the conviction ordering a new trial, and that the trial judge erred by not putting the mistaken-belief defence to the jury.

Held
The conviction restored.

== Reasoning ==
This case discusses the defence of mistaken belief and how there must be an air of reality to that defence, i.e. the accused cannot put forth the defence if there is no air of reality in relation to the evidence in the case. In this particular situation there was little if no evidence that might have substantiated his allegation that he might have had an honest belief that she was giving consent, i.e. she was a born again Christian, she did not believe in premarital sex, the objective evidence of redness on the inner labia, consistent with consensual or non-consensual intercourse.

The opinion of L'Heureux-Dubé J. stresses that there is an issue of treating women and men equally in these types of cases regarding the equality rights that afforded to all by the Canadian Charter of Rights and Freedoms (at page 864):

...ss. 15 and 28 of the Canadian Charter of Rights and Freedoms, guaranteeing equality to men and women, play a special role in the context of sexual assault. In my view, there may be reason to believe that the existing role of consent in the mens rea of the offence of sexual assault raises some concerns with respect to those two provisions of the Charter. Briefly put, the current common law approach to consent may perpetuate social stereotypes that have historically victimized women and undermined their equal right to bodily integrity and human dignity.
