= Smith v Jones =

1999 judgment of the Supreme Court of Canada

Smith v Jones is a 1999 judgment of the Supreme Court of Canada that was decided on appeal from the British Columbia Court of Appeal. The Appellant sought to keep secret the professional opinion of the Respondent, a psychologist, whom the former had retained as part of his trial for aggravated assault of a prostitute. The Respondent had sought to publish his opinion of the Appellant's psychology because he felt that the Appellant posed a danger to society.

In the result the file will be unsealed and the ban on the publication of the contents of the file is removed, except for those parts of the affidavit of the doctor which do not fall within the public safety exception. Subject to this direction the order of the British Columbia Court of Appeal is affirmed.

The Respondent sought to recover his costs, but the majority rejected him and decided that the Appellant had reason to believe that the solicitor-client privilege would prevail absent a court judgment to the contrary.

The 1976 Supreme Court of California decision Tarasoff v. Regents of the University of California figured substantially in the ruling.
