= R v Prosper =

- Supreme Court of Canada

Hearing: March 2, 3, 1994 Judgment: September 29, 1994
- Full case name: Cyril Patrick Prosper v Her Majesty The Queen
- Citations: [1994] 3 S.C.R. 236
- Docket No.: 23178

Court membership
- Chief Justice: Antonio Lamer; Puisne Justices: Gérard La Forest, Claire L'Heureux-Dubé, John Sopinka, Charles Gonthier, Peter Cory, Beverley McLachlin, Frank Iacobucci, John C. Major

Reasons given
- Majority: Lamer C.J., joined by Sopinka, Cory and Iacobucci JJ.
- Concurrence: McLachlin J.
- Dissent: Gonthier J.
- Dissent: L'Heureux‑Dubé J.
- Dissent: La Forest J.
- Dissent: Major J.

R v Prosper, [1994] 3 S.C.R. 236 is a decision of the Supreme Court of Canada on the right to duty counsel upon arrest or detainment by police under section 10(b) of the Canadian Charter of Rights and Freedoms. The Court found that merely reading the accused his or her rights is insufficient to discharge the right to counsel; the police must also provide the accused with access to legal aid or duty counsel.

Cyril Prosper was pulled over by the police for driving erratically. The police noticed that he was severely inebriated and arrested him. They read him his rights and provided him access to a telephone and telephone directory to call a lawyer. He declined to call a lawyer in private practice as he said he could not afford it. He then agreed to take a Breathalyzer test.

At trial Prosper successfully argued that Breathalyzer results were taken in violation of his Charter rights to counsel under section 10(b).

The question before the Supreme Court was first, whether section 10(b) of the Charter imposes a substantive constitutional obligation on governments to ensure that duty counsel is available upon arrest or detention to provide free and immediate preliminary legal advice upon request.

Second, whether the evidence should be excluded under section 24(2) of the Charter as it would bring the administration of justice into disrepute.

The court unanimously held that the Charter does not impose an obligation to ensure duty counsel is available upon arrest. In a five to three decision the Court held that the evidence should be excluded.

== See also ==
- List of Supreme Court of Canada cases (Lamer Court)
