= New Brunswick (Minister of Health and Community Services) v G (J) =

- Supreme Court of Canada

Hearing: 9 November 1998 Judgment: 10 September 1999
- Full case name: JG v The Minister of Health and Community Services, the Law Society of New Brunswick, Legal Aid New Brunswick, the Attorney General for New Brunswick and the Minister of Justice
- Citations: [1999] 3 S.C.R. 46
- Ruling: G. appeal allowed

Court membership
- Chief Justice: Antonio Lamer; Puisne Justices: Claire L'Heureux-Dubé, Charles Gonthier, Peter Cory, Beverley McLachlin, Frank Iacobucci, John C. Major, Michel Bastarache, Ian Binnie

Reasons given
- Majority: Lamer C.J., joined by Gonthier, Cory, McLachlin, Major and Binnie JJ.
- Concurrence: L’Heureux‑Dubé J., joined by Gonthier and McLachlin JJ.

New Brunswick (Minister of Health and Community Services) v G (J), [1999] 3 S.C.R. 46, is a leading Supreme Court of Canada decision on right to legal aid services. The Court held that the denial of legal aid to parents whose custody of their child was challenged by the government is a violation of section 7 of the Canadian Charter of Rights and Freedoms.

== Background ==
The New Brunswick Minister of Health and Community Services gained custody of three children of J.G. for a period of six months. At the end of the six months the minister applied to extend it another six months. J.G. sought to argue against it and applied for legal aid under the provincial Domestic Legal Aid program. She was refused. She challenged the legal aid policy as a violation of section 7 of the Charter.

The motions judge found that there was no violation. This decision was upheld at the Court of Appeal.

The issue before the Supreme Court was whether "indigent parents have a constitutional right to be provided with state-funded counsel when a government seeks a judicial order suspending such parents’ custody of their children."

== Reasons of the court ==
=== Mootness ===
Lamer C.J., writing for the majority, rejected arguments that the court should refrain from ruling on this issue because the matter was moot as J.G. had already regained custody of her children. He rejected such arguments by applying the test from Borowski about when a court should decide a moot case. In this situation, the court decided that this was an important matter that was unlikely to return to the court and whenever it did return to the court it would be with a moot issue because of the length of time such cases take to reach the Supreme Court of Canada and because of the difficulty for indigent parents who cannot afford legal counsel to pursue such cases in the appellate courts.

=== Security of the Person, Section 7 ===
Chief Justice Lamer, for the majority, held that in these particular circumstances the government has an obligation to provide legal aid. He did not discount, however, the possibility that cost-reduction could be an objective sufficiently important to deny a fair hearing. In the circumstances, Lamer found that the savings from the denial to be minimal and so could not be grounds to deny J.G. her rights under section 7.

Section 7 was engaged because of the negative impact on psychological integrity of J.G. This negative impact need not rise to the level of “nervous shock” or “physical illness,” but must be greater than “ordinary stress or anxiety.” The Supreme Court said that s. 24 (1) remedy in such a case is for the courts to order state-funded counsel.

== See also ==
- List of Supreme Court of Canada cases (Lamer Court)
