= R v Jobidon =

- Supreme Court of Canada

Hearing: March 28, 1991 Judgment: September 26, 1991
- Full case name: Jules Jobidon v Her Majesty The Queen
- Citations: [1991] 2 SCR 714
- Prior history: Found guilty of manslaughter by the Court of Appeal for Ontario.
- Ruling: Appeal was dismissed.

Holding
- An accused cannot rely on a defence of consent for causing serious hurt or non-trivial bodily harm.

Court membership
- Chief Justice: Antonio Lamer; Puisne Justices: Gérard La Forest, Claire L'Heureux-Dubé, John Sopinka, Charles Gonthier, Peter Cory, Beverley McLachlin, William Stevenson, Frank Iacobucci

Reasons given
- Majority: Gonthier J, joined by La Forest, L'Heureux-Dubé, Cory and Iacobucci JJ
- Concur/dissent: Sopinka J, joined by Stevenson J
- Lamer CJ took no part in the consideration or decision of the case.

R v Jobidon, [1991] 2 SCR 714 is a leading Supreme Court of Canada decision where the Court held that consent cannot be used as a defence for a criminal act such as assault which may cause "serious hurt or non-trivial bodily harm".

== Background ==
In September 1986, Rodney Haggart was celebrating his engagement in a hotel bar near Sudbury, Ontario. Haggart had an exchange of angry words with Jules Jobidon, a young man at the bar with his brother. Haggart challenged him to a fight in the bar but it was soon broken up. They both agreed the fight was not over.

Jobidon waited outside until Haggart left to continue the fight. His first punch was with such force that Haggart was knocked unconscious. Jobidon immediately continued to punch him in the head. Haggart was taken to a hospital and later died of severe contusions to the head. Jobidon was charged with manslaughter.

At trial, the judge found that though Jobidon did not intend to kill him, the possibility of serious injury was foreseeable. Jobidon successfully argued that Haggart had consented to the fight, and so he was acquitted. The Court of Appeal overturned the verdict and substituted a conviction for manslaughter.

The principal issue was whether the absence of consent is a material element which must be proven by the Crown in all cases of assault or whether there are common law limitations which restrict or negate the legal defence of consent in certain types of cases.

== Reasons of the Court ==
Justice Gonthier, writing for the majority, held that the criminal law has a "paternalistic" dimension which attempts to ensure that all "citizens treat each other humanely and with respect". Nevertheless, consent would be a valid defence where the harm was trivial or where it is part of a socially valuable activity such as sports.

Justice Sopinka, in concurring with the decision, but not with the majority's reasoning, held that the majority was expanding the scope of section 265 beyond what was intended by Parliament. One fact of the case was that Jobidon continued to beat the victim after the victim had been knocked unconscious. This fact led Justice Sopinka to concur with the initial trial judge by stating that the victim lacked the agency to consent to the fight once he was knocked unconscious, and therefore, Jobidon could not use consent as a defence and was guilty of manslaughter by the unlawful act of assault.

== See also ==
- List of Supreme Court of Canada cases (Lamer Court)
- R v Coney
