= Thomson Newspapers Co v Canada (AG) =

Freedom of expression case in Supreme Court of Canada

- Court: Supreme Court of Canada
- Decided: [1998] 1 S.C.R. 877
- Citation: [1998] 1 S.C.R. 877

Case history
- Subsequent actions: The Supreme Court struck down the law, finding it violated section 2(b) of the Canadian Charter of Rights and Freedoms and was too restrictive to be justified under section 1 of the Charter.

Case opinions
- The law restricting the publication, broadcast, or dissemination of opinion surveys within the last three days of a federal election campaign violated section 2(b) of the Canadian Charter of Rights and Freedoms.

Thomson Newspapers Co v Canada (AG), [1998] 1 S.C.R. 877, is a leading Supreme Court of Canada decision on the right to freedom of expression in which the Supreme Court struck down a law that prohibited the publication, broadcast, or dissemination of opinion surveys within the last three days of a federal election campaign, as it violated section 2(b) of the Canadian Charter of Rights and Freedoms. The provision clearly restricted expression and was found to be too restrictive to be justified under section 1 of the Charter.

== See also ==
- List of Supreme Court of Canada cases (Lamer Court)
