= Pushpanathan v Canada (Minister of Citizenship and Immigration) =

- Supreme Court of Canada

Hearing: October 9, 1997 Judgment: June 4, 1998
- Full case name: Veluppillai Pushpanathan v The Minister of Citizenship and Immigration
- Citations: [1998] 1 SCR 982
- Ruling: Appeal Allowed.

Court membership
- Chief Justice: Antonio Lamer; Puisne Justices: Claire L'Heureux-Dubé, John Sopinka, Charles Gonthier, Peter Cory, Beverley McLachlin, Frank Iacobucci, John C. Major, Michel Bastarache

Reasons given
- Majority: Bastarache J (paras 1–77), joined by L'Heureux-Dubé, Gonthier and McLachlin JJ
- Dissent: Cory J (paras. 78–158), joined by Major J

Pushpanathan v Canada (Minister of Citizenship and Immigration) is a leading decision of the Supreme Court of Canada on the standard of review in Canadian administrative law. The Court held that a decision of the Immigration and Refugee Board should be reviewed on the standard of "correctness."

== Background ==
Veluppillai Pushpanathan arrived in Canada seeking refugee status from his native country of Sri Lanka. Before the claim was settled, he was convicted of conspiracy to traffic in narcotic in Canada, and was sent to prison. On the basis of his conviction, he was denied refugee status under article 1F(c) of the UN Convention Relating to the Status of Refugees which excluded claimants "with respect to whom there are serious reasons for considering that [they have] been guilty of acts contrary to the purposes and principles of the United Nations." A conditional deportation order was issued by the Immigration and Refugee Board.

== Issue ==
The issue of whether the criminal conviction was contrary to the principles listed in the Convention was submitted for judicial review, and the court was further asked to determine the standard of review to be applied to the Immigration and Refugee Board's decision regarding Pushpanathan.

== Judgment of the Court ==
Justice Bastarache wrote for a majority of the Court.

=== Standard of review ===
Bastarache noted that even though the lower courts did not address it, the standard of review must be established before considering the other issues. He reviewed the "pragmatic and functional approach" from Union des Employes de Service, Local 298 v Bibeault and the three available standards of review. In a key passage, the judgement redefined the meaning of 'jurisdictional' in administrative law:

A question which "goes to jurisdiction" is simply descriptive of a provision for which the proper standard of review is correctness, based upon the outcome of the pragmatic and functional analysis. In other words, "jurisdictional error" is simply an error on an issue with respect to which, according to the outcome of the pragmatic and functional analysis, the tribunal must make a correct interpretation and to which no deference will be shown.

The Court reiterated the four factors to be considered when determining the standard of review that the courts should apply. These factors include:

- The presence or absence of a privative clause
- The relative expertise of the courts and the administrative decision-maker
- The purpose of the act as a whole, and the provision at issue in particular
- The Nature of the Problem: a question of law or fact?

The court concluded that since the issue was "a serious question of general importance" there was no other standard but that of "correctness".
