= Peter Cory =

Canadian judge (1925–2020)

Puisne Justice of the Supreme Court of Canada
- In office February 1, 1989 – June 1, 1999
- Nominated by: Brian Mulroney
- Preceded by: Gerald Le Dain
- Succeeded by: Louise Arbour

Personal details
- Born: Peter deCarteret Cory; October 25, 1925 Windsor, Ontario
- Died: April 7, 2020 (aged 94) Mississauga
- Spouse(s): Edith Nash (deceased); Mary Dayton

Peter deCarteret Cory, CC QC (October 25, 1925 – April 7, 2020) was a puisne judge of the Supreme Court of Canada, from 1989 to 1999.

== Early life and education ==
Born in Windsor, Ontario, the son of Andrew and Mildred (Beresford Howe) Cory, he was educated at the University of Western Ontario (Assumption) receiving his BA in 1947 and at Osgoode Hall Law School receiving his law degree in 1950. He was called to the Ontario Bar in 1950.

== Career ==
As a pilot in the Royal Canadian Air Force, he served overseas with 6th Bomber Group during World War II, flying many combat missions. He was appointed to the Queen's Counsel in 1963. He practised law with Holden, Murdoch and was elected a Bencher of the Law Society of Upper Canada in 1971.

Cory was appointed to the Supreme Court of Ontario in 1974, the Court of Appeal for Ontario in 1981 and the Supreme Court of Canada on February 1, 1989. He retired from the Supreme Court on June 1, 1999.

== Post-Court ==
He served as the 11th Chancellor of York University from 2004 to 2008. He was an Honorary Colonel of the 426 Transport Training Squadron.

In 2002, Cory was made a Companion of the Order of Canada.

Following his retirement, Cory was appointed to conduct an independent inquiry into six particular deaths during "the Troubles" in Northern Ireland. The Cory Collusion Inquiry was established to investigate allegations of collusion between security forces and paramilitaries in those cases.

== Personal life ==
Cory was married to Edith Nash and had three children. He was a Mississaugan as of 2002.

Cory was chairman of the Ontario Civil Liberties Section of the Canadian Bar Association ("CBA"), president of the County of York Law Association, national director of the CBA and president of the Advocates' Society.

He died in Mississauga on April 7, 2020.

== See also ==
- 1989 judgments of the Supreme Court of Canada

Academic offices
Preceded by Avie Bennett	Chancellor of York University; 2004–2008	Succeeded by Roy McMurtry
