= Kuipers v Gordon Riley Transport =

1976 personal injury lawsuit

- Court: Alberta Supreme Court, Trial Division in Edmonton
- Full case name: Gerhardus Kuipers et al. v Gordon Riley Transport Ltd. 1967
- Decided: 30 September 1976
- Verdict: Defendant to pay $124,077.09 CAD in damages

Court membership
- Judge sitting: Samuel Sereth Lieberman

Kuipers v Gordon Riley Transport, 1 C.C.L.T. 233 (1976) (Note: In such case citations, C.C.L.T. denotes Canadian Cases on the Law of Torts.) was a Canadian personal injury case involving negligence, standard of care, causation, and hindsight.

== Background ==
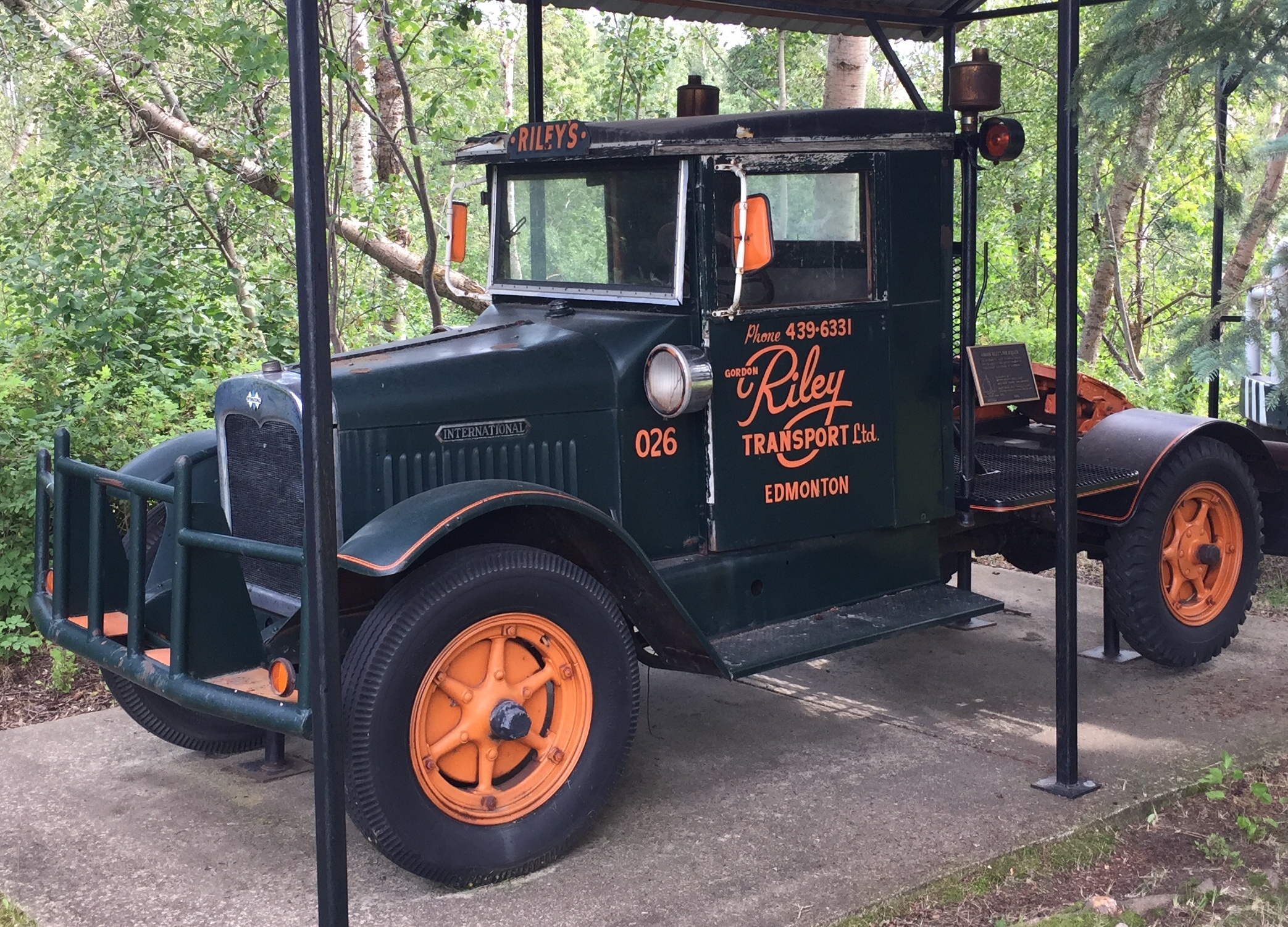
A Gordon Riley Transport truck on display at the Oilfield Technical Society's Centennial Park in southwest Edmonton

On 29 January 1972, Albertan newspapers including the Edmonton Journal and the Red Deer Advocate reported that a young boy had sustained serious injuries following a car crash south of Red Deer the previous day (28 January 1972). The following week the Lacombe Globe reported on the incident as well. Four years later when the injuries were addressed in court, the multi-vehicle collision was described in more detail. An initial collision between two vehicles in a whiteout area led both drivers to stop southbound on Alberta Highway 2. When a third vehicle driven by plaintiff Gerhardus Kuipers approached the site of the collision, it was forced to stop. A semi-trailer truck operated by Gordon Riley Transport subsequently entered the whiteout area and violently struck Kuipers' vehicle from the rear. Other collisions resulted and Alberta Supreme Court Justice Samuel Sereth Lieberman stated that the incident came to involve a total of eight vehicles.

== Trial and verdict ==
Kuipers claimed against all drivers of the other vehicles; however, Lieberman only advanced the charge against the Gordon Riley Transport vehicle that had struck the Kuipers vehicle. Counsel for the plaintiffs included Alec T. Murray, who went on to serve as a Justice of the Court of King’s Bench of Alberta and later as Associate Chief Justice. The case was settled in Kuipers' favour and the family was awarded a total of $124,077.09 CAD in damages. (Note: When inflation adjusted, this is $547,375.46 CAD in 2020 dollars.)

In Lieberman's final judgment, he cited Teno v Arnold (1974) stating that "in Teno v. Arnold, supra, the Ontario Court of Appeal disagreed with Chief Justice McGillivray's view that the figures to be used in assessing damages for pain suffering and loss of amenities were arbitrary or conventional. That Court, however, accepted the principle that awards for similar injuries should be comparable." Lieberman cited Teno v Arnold when explaining his assessment of damages.

== Impact ==
Kuipers v Gordon Riley Transport has received judicial notice and has been followed variously in the Supreme Court of Prince Edward Island, the Supreme Court of British Columbia, and the Court of Queen's Bench of Alberta.

=== Negligence and standard of care ===
The majority of cases that cite Kuipers v Gordon Riley Transport reference Lieberman's discussions of negligence and standard of care. Beginning in 1980, four years after Lieberman had delivered judgement, Justice Kenneth R. MacDonald judged MacKinnon v Hashie, stating "I must determine liability for damages suffered by the plaintiff. The approach which I must follow in a case such as this has been succinctly stated by Lieberman J. in Kuipers et al. v Gordon Riley Transport." MacDonald subsequently quoted Lieberman as follows:

The driving conduct of the plaintiff Gerhardus Kuipers, and indeed of all the drivers involved in these collisions, must be considered in light of the general rule that the standard of care to be exercised by a driver of a motor vehicle in a particular set of circumstances is that which would be exercised by a reasonable and prudent driver in that set of circumstances.

— Samuel Sereth Lieberman, Kuipers v Gordon Riley Transport, p. 1

Lieberman followed this by quoting Edward Alderson: "Negligence is the omission to do something which a reasonable man, guided upon those considerations which ordinarily regulate the conduct of human affairs, would do, or doing something which a prudent and reasonable man would not do." Therefore Lieberman's judgment considered the standard not to be one of perfection, but "an objective standard based upon the conduct of a reasonable driver in a particular set of circumstances." Lieberman's discussion of negligence has been similarly quoted by Justice Alexander B. Campbell in Matheson v Coughlin (1989), by Arthur M. Lutz in Jones v Green (1993) and by Armand DesRoches in Gordon Ferguson v MacLeod (2000).

Kuipers v Gordon Riley Transport has been historically associated with a number of Albertan personal injury lawsuits from the 1970s that were argued on negligence principles as opposed to the English tort of public nuisance. (Note: In addition to Kuipers v Gordon Riley Transport, see Albertan cases such as Abbott v Kasza (1976), Marchuk v Scott (1978), and Tiessan v Scott (1979), all of which have been identified by Jason W. Neyers as marking a historical shift in Canadian tort case law.) In his paper "Divergence and Convergence in the Tort of Public Nuisance," Jason W. Neyers compares and contrasts the legal history of Canada and England, and the ways in which personal injury lawsuits have been argued alternately on negligence principles and on the tort of public nuisance:

While at one time [Canadian] courts followed the traditional English position that accidents on or near the public highways could alternatively be pleaded in either negligence or public nuisance, after 1960 claims in public nuisance for personal injuries caused on the highway became less frequent as negligence came to be the dominant cause of action. In Alberta this trend was accelerated by the decision of the Alberta Court of Appeal in Abbott v Kasza.

— Jason W. Neyers, Divergence and Convergence in the Tort of Public Nuisance, Divergence in Private Law, p. 89 - ISBN 9781509921126

Neyers subsequently cites Kuipers v Gordon Riley Transport as an exemplary case when stating that after Abbott v Kasza, "Alberta courts consistently decided these issues using negligence principles" as opposed to the tort of public nuisance.

=== Causation and hindsight ===
Although the majority of cases that cite Kuipers v Gordon Riley Transport refer to Lieberman's discussion of negligence and standard of care, the lawsuit has also appeared in Canadian case law with reference to the Lieberman's discussions of causation and hindsight. In Woitas v Tremblay (2018) Justice Roderick P. Wacowich cited Kuipers v Gordon Riley Transport for Lieberman's dismissal of the plaintiff's suggestion that "the actions of the other drivers established a 'chain of causation' leading up to the collision involving the plaintiff." Lieberman countered the chain of causation hypothesis by stating the following:

This reasoning it seems to me is a glaring example of reasoning by hindsight, the danger of which I already mentioned, and is unacceptable. I repeat, that even if the Kuipers vehicle had been proceeding at a slow rate of speed it would have still been struck by the Riley unit [driven by Smith]. The presence of other vehicles stationary on the highway in no way contributed to the final collision, the sole and effective cause of which I find was Smith’s negligence.

— Samuel Sereth Lieberman, Kuipers v Gordon Riley Transport, p. 10

When Justice Barry M. Davies delivered judgment in Oliverius v British Columbia (1999), he cited Kuipers v Gordon Riley Transport, stating "in assessing whether a driver has acted reasonably and prudently in the circumstances facing that driver, care must be taken to avoid standards of perfection based upon hindsight." (Note: This was with reference to a collision on the Rogers Pass involving two logging trucks that took place on 12 February 1994 whereby Lance Oliverius subsequently attempted to sue the Province of British Columbia. The Calgary Herald reported that the resulting highway closures prevented a major performance of The Wizard of Oz from taking place at the Southern Alberta Jubilee Auditorium because the cast and crew were unable to travel from Vancouver to Calgary.) The same discussion of "standards of perfection based upon hindsight" was cited by British Columbia Supreme Court Justice Robert W. Jenkins in Penner International v Basabara Estate (2013).
