= List of Sites of Community Importance in the Canary Islands =

This is a list of Sites of Community Importance in the Canary Islands.

ID	Name	Coordinates	Image
ES0000041	Ojeda, Inagua y Pajonales (official name: Ojeda, Inagua y Pajonales); Other names: n/a	27.9438°N 15.6985°W	Looks like this Site of Community Interest has an image. Don't worry, you can take one of your own, and upload it too!
ES0000043	Caldera de Taburiente (official name: Caldera de Taburiente); Other names: n/a	28.7215°N 17.8668°W	Looks like this Site of Community Interest has an image. Don't worry, you can take one of your own, and upload it too!
ES0000044	Garajonay (official name: Garajonay); Other names: n/a	28.1306°N 17.2481°W	Looks like this Site of Community Interest has an image. Don't worry, you can take one of your own, and upload it too!
ES0000096	Pozo Negro (official name: Pozo Negro); Other names: n/a	28.2868°N 13.9505°W	Looks like this Site of Community Interest has an image. Don't worry, you can take one of your own, and upload it too!
ES0000102	Garoé (official name: Garoé); Other names: n/a	27.79702°N 17.94482°W	Looks like this Site of Community Interest has an image. Don't worry, you can take one of your own, and upload it too!
ES0000108	Los Órganos (official name: Los Órganos); Other names: n/a	28.213240000000006°N 17.26805°W	Looks like this Site of Community Interest has an image. Don't worry, you can take one of your own, and upload it too!
ES0000111	Tamadaba (official name: Tamadaba); Other names: n/a	28.03428°N 15.72664°W	Looks like this Site of Community Interest has an image. Don't worry, you can take one of your own, and upload it too!
ES0000112	Juncalillo del Sur (official name: Juncalillo del Sur); Other names: n/a	27.7971°N 15.47867°W	Looks like this Site of Community Interest has an image. Don't worry, you can take one of your own, and upload it too!
ES0000113	Macizo de Tauro (official name: Macizo de Tauro); Other names: n/a	27.87739°N 15.7043°W	Looks like this Site of Community Interest has an image. Don't worry, you can take one of your own, and upload it too!
ES0000141	Parque Nacional de Timanfaya (official name: Parque Nacional de Timanfaya); Other names: n/a	29.01412°N 13.780029999999998°W	Looks like this Site of Community Interest has an image. Don't worry, you can take one of your own, and upload it too!
ES7010002	Barranco Oscuro (official name: Barranco Oscuro); Other names: n/a	28.064870000000006°N 15.59283°W	Looks like this Site of Community Interest has an image. Don't worry, you can take one of your own, and upload it too!
ES7010003	El Brezal (official name: El Brezal); Other names: n/a	28.11345°N 15.60015°W	This Site of Community Interest has no photo. Take one and upload it! Thanks!
ES7010004	Azuaje (official name: Azuaje); Other names: n/a	28.081570000000006°N 15.565°W	Looks like this Site of Community Interest has an image. Don't worry, you can take one of your own, and upload it too!
ES7010005	Los Tilos de Moya (official name: Los Tilos de Moya); Other names: n/a	28.087290000000007°N 15.59407°W	Looks like this Site of Community Interest has an image. Don't worry, you can take one of your own, and upload it too!
ES7010006	Los Marteles (official name: Los Marteles); Other names: n/a	27.95212°N 15.52273°W	Looks like this Site of Community Interest has an image. Don't worry, you can take one of your own, and upload it too!
ES7010007	Las Dunas de Maspalomas (official name: Las Dunas de Maspalomas); Other names: n/a	27.74278°N 15.58285°W	Looks like this Site of Community Interest has an image. Don't worry, you can take one of your own, and upload it too!
ES7010008	Güigüí (official name: Güigüí); Other names: n/a	27.9519°N 15.81301°W	Looks like this Site of Community Interest has an image. Don't worry, you can take one of your own, and upload it too!
ES7010010	Pilancones (official name: Pilancones); Other names: n/a	27.87087°N 15.61747°W	Looks like this Site of Community Interest has an image. Don't worry, you can take one of your own, and upload it too!
ES7010011	Amagro (official name: Amagro); Other names: n/a	28.13163°N 15.67927°W	Looks like this Site of Community Interest has an image. Don't worry, you can take one of your own, and upload it too!
ES7010012	Bandama (official name: Bandama); Other names: n/a	28.029190000000003°N 15.45776°W	Looks like this Site of Community Interest has an image. Don't worry, you can take one of your own, and upload it too!
ES7010014	Cueva de Lobos (official name: Cueva de Lobos); Other names: n/a	28.289°N 14.2654°W	This Site of Community Interest has no photo. Take one and upload it! Thanks!
ES7010018	Riscos de Tirajana (official name: Riscos de Tirajana); Other names: n/a	27.94895°N 15.57267°W	Looks like this Site of Community Interest has an image. Don't worry, you can take one of your own, and upload it too!
ES7010019	Roque de Nublo (official name: Roque de Nublo); Other names: n/a	27.96763°N 15.61391°W	Looks like this Site of Community Interest has an image. Don't worry, you can take one of your own, and upload it too!
ES7010023	Malpaís de la Arena (official name: Malpaís de la Arena); Other names: n/a	28.63463°N 13.93194°W	Looks like this Site of Community Interest has an image. Don't worry, you can take one of your own, and upload it too!
ES7010024	Vega de Río Palmas (official name: Vega de Río Palmas); Other names: n/a	28.398190000000003°N 14.085120000000002°W	Looks like this Site of Community Interest has an image. Don't worry, you can take one of your own, and upload it too!
ES7010025	Fataga (official name: Fataga); Other names: n/a	27.86079°N 15.5734°W	Looks like this Site of Community Interest has an image. Don't worry, you can take one of your own, and upload it too!
ES7010027	Jinámar (official name: Jinámar); Other names: n/a	28.03273°N 15.39996°W	This Site of Community Interest has no photo. Take one and upload it! Thanks!
ES7010028	Tufia (official name: Tufia); Other names: n/a	27.95991°N 15.38194°W	Looks like this Site of Community Interest has an image. Don't worry, you can take one of your own, and upload it too!
ES7010031	Islote de Lobos (official name: Islote de Lobos); Other names: n/a	28.75013°N 13.82162°W	Looks like this Site of Community Interest has an image. Don't worry, you can take one of your own, and upload it too!
ES7010032	Corralejo (official name: Corralejo); Other names: n/a	28.67956°N 13.84671°W	Looks like this Site of Community Interest has an image. Don't worry, you can take one of your own, and upload it too!
ES7010033	Jandía (official name: Jandía); Other names: n/a	28.11601°N 14.33852°W	Looks like this Site of Community Interest has an image. Don't worry, you can take one of your own, and upload it too!
ES7010034	Montaña Cardón (official name: Montaña Cardón); Other names: n/a	28.25599°N 14.1599°W	This Site of Community Interest has no photo. Take one and upload it! Thanks!
ES7010036	Punta del Mármol (official name: Punta del Mármol); Other names: n/a	28.14994°N 15.61535°W	This Site of Community Interest has no photo. Take one and upload it! Thanks!
ES7010038	Barranco de La Virgen (official name: Barranco de La Virgen); Other names: n/a	28.04775°N 15.59°W	Looks like this Site of Community Interest has an image. Don't worry, you can take one of your own, and upload it too!
ES7010039	El Nublo II (official name: El Nublo II); Other names: n/a	27.96504°N 15.66796°W	Looks like this Site of Community Interest has an image. Don't worry, you can take one of your own, and upload it too!
ES7010040	Hoya del Gamonal (official name: Hoya del Gamonal); Other names: n/a	27.97365°N 15.564470000000002°W	Looks like this Site of Community Interest has an image. Don't worry, you can take one of your own, and upload it too!
ES7010041	Barranco de Guayadeque (official name: Barranco de Guayadeque); Other names: n/a	27.93271°N 15.485729999999998°W	Looks like this Site of Community Interest has an image. Don't worry, you can take one of your own, and upload it too!
ES7010042	La Playa del Matorral (official name: La Playa del Matorral); Other names: n/a	28.0489°N 14.32957°W	Looks like this Site of Community Interest has an image. Don't worry, you can take one of your own, and upload it too!
ES7010044	Los Islotes (official name: Los Islotes); Other names: n/a	29.29793°N 13.53283°W	Looks like this Site of Community Interest has an image. Don't worry, you can take one of your own, and upload it too!
ES7010045	Archipiélago Chinijo (official name: Archipiélago Chinijo); Other names: n/a	29.20411°N 13.53377°W	Looks like this Site of Community Interest has an image. Don't worry, you can take one of your own, and upload it too!
ES7010046	Los Volcanes (official name: Los Volcanes); Other names: n/a	29.006220000000006°N 13.75002°W	Looks like this Site of Community Interest has an image. Don't worry, you can take one of your own, and upload it too!
ES7010047	La Corona (official name: La Corona); Other names: n/a	29.18136°N 13.44876°W	Looks like this Site of Community Interest has an image. Don't worry, you can take one of your own, and upload it too!
ES7010049	Arinaga (official name: Arinaga); Other names: n/a	27.8683°N 15.39188°W	Looks like this Site of Community Interest has an image. Don't worry, you can take one of your own, and upload it too!
ES7010052	Punta de la Sal (official name: Punta de la Sal); Other names: n/a	27.878290000000003°N 15.39018°W	Looks like this Site of Community Interest has an image. Don't worry, you can take one of your own, and upload it too!
ES7010054	Los Jameos (official name: Los Jameos); Other names: n/a	29.1518°N 13.42591°W	Looks like this Site of Community Interest has an image. Don't worry, you can take one of your own, and upload it too!
ES7010055	Amurga (official name: Amurga); Other names: n/a	27.8277°N 15.542179999999998°W	Looks like this Site of Community Interest has an image. Don't worry, you can take one of your own, and upload it too!
ES7010062	Betancuria (official name: Betancuria); Other names: n/a	28.39047°N 14.06585°W	Looks like this Site of Community Interest has an image. Don't worry, you can take one of your own, and upload it too!
ES7010063	Nublo (official name: Nublo); Other names: n/a	27.89374°N 15.77399°W	This Site of Community Interest has no photo. Take one and upload it! Thanks!
ES7010064	Ancones-Sice (official name: Ancones-Sice); Other names: n/a	28.33666°N 14.06631°W	This Site of Community Interest has no photo. Take one and upload it! Thanks!
ES7010065	Malpaís del Cuchillo (official name: Malpaís del Cuchillo); Other names: n/a	29.10843°N 13.64926°W	This Site of Community Interest has no photo. Take one and upload it! Thanks!
ES7011001	Los Risquetes (official name: Los Risquetes); Other names: n/a	29.11199°N 13.659720000000002°W	This Site of Community Interest has no photo. Take one and upload it! Thanks!
ES7011003	Pino Santo (official name: Pino Santo); Other names: n/a	28.060240000000004°N 15.50053°W	Looks like this Site of Community Interest has an image. Don't worry, you can take one of your own, and upload it too!
ES7011004	Macizo de Tauro II (official name: Macizo de Tauro II); Other names: n/a	27.82852°N 15.6878°W	Looks like this Site of Community Interest has an image. Don't worry, you can take one of your own, and upload it too!
ES7020001	Mencáfete (official name: Mencáfete); Other names: n/a	27.739140000000006°N 18.0918°W	This Site of Community Interest has no photo. Take one and upload it! Thanks!
ES7020002	Roques de Salmor (official name: Roques de Salmor); Other names: n/a	27.823290000000004°N 17.99544°W	Looks like this Site of Community Interest has an image. Don't worry, you can take one of your own, and upload it too!
ES7020003	Tibataje (official name: Tibataje); Other names: n/a	27.79381°N 17.985129999999995°W	Looks like this Site of Community Interest has an image. Don't worry, you can take one of your own, and upload it too!
ES7020004	Risco de Las Playas (official name: Risco de Las Playas); Other names: n/a	27.71276°N 17.963079999999994°W	Looks like this Site of Community Interest has an image. Don't worry, you can take one of your own, and upload it too!
ES7020006	Timijiraque (official name: Timijiraque); Other names: n/a	27.77541°N 17.91941°W	Looks like this Site of Community Interest has an image. Don't worry, you can take one of your own, and upload it too!
ES7020008	Pinar de Garafía (official name: Pinar de Garafía); Other names: n/a	28.7803°N 17.87548°W	Looks like this Site of Community Interest has an image. Don't worry, you can take one of your own, and upload it too!
ES7020009	Guelguén (official name: Guelguén); Other names: n/a	28.8262°N 17.87002°W	Looks like this Site of Community Interest has an image. Don't worry, you can take one of your own, and upload it too!
ES7020010	Las Nieves (official name: Las Nieves); Other names: n/a	28.7454°N 17.8111°W	Looks like this Site of Community Interest has an image. Don't worry, you can take one of your own, and upload it too!
ES7020011	Cumbre Vieja (official name: Cumbre Vieja); Other names: n/a	28.58156°N 17.83994°W	Looks like this Site of Community Interest has an image. Don't worry, you can take one of your own, and upload it too!
ES7020012	Montaña de Azufre (official name: Montaña de Azufre); Other names: n/a	28.56128°N 17.77179°W	Looks like this Site of Community Interest has an image. Don't worry, you can take one of your own, and upload it too!
ES7020014	Risco de la Concepción (official name: Risco de la Concepción); Other names: n/a	28.67598°N 17.77542°W	Looks like this Site of Community Interest has an image. Don't worry, you can take one of your own, and upload it too!
ES7020015	Costa de Hiscaguán (official name: Costa de Hiscaguán); Other names: n/a	28.79761°N 17.98323°W	Looks like this Site of Community Interest has an image. Don't worry, you can take one of your own, and upload it too!
ES7020016	Barranco del Jorado (official name: Barranco del Jorado); Other names: n/a	28.70312°N 17.96078°W	Looks like this Site of Community Interest has an image. Don't worry, you can take one of your own, and upload it too!
ES7020018	Tubo volcánico de Todoque (official name: Tubo volcánico de Todoque); Other names: n/a	28.60237°N 17.89252°W	Looks like this Site of Community Interest has an image. Don't worry, you can take one of your own, and upload it too!
ES7020020	Tablado (official name: Tablado); Other names: n/a	28.81543°N 17.88241°W	This Site of Community Interest has no photo. Take one and upload it! Thanks!
ES7020021	Barranco de las Angustias (official name: Barranco de las Angustias); Other names: n/a	28.69094°N 17.90936°W	Looks like this Site of Community Interest has an image. Don't worry, you can take one of your own, and upload it too!
ES7020022	Tamanca (official name: Tamanca); Other names: n/a	28.54592°N 17.87238°W	This Site of Community Interest has no photo. Take one and upload it! Thanks!
ES7020024	Juan Mayor (official name: Juan Mayor); Other names: n/a	28.68487°N 17.782770000000006°W	This Site of Community Interest has no photo. Take one and upload it! Thanks!
ES7020025	Barranco del Agua (official name: Barranco del Agua); Other names: n/a	28.72451°N 17.75004°W	Looks like this Site of Community Interest has an image. Don't worry, you can take one of your own, and upload it too!
ES7020026	La Caldereta (official name: La Caldereta); Other names: n/a	27.74198°N 18.01425°W	This Site of Community Interest has no photo. Take one and upload it! Thanks!
ES7020028	Benchijigua (official name: Benchijigua); Other names: n/a	28.09872°N 17.221320000000002°W	Looks like this Site of Community Interest has an image. Don't worry, you can take one of your own, and upload it too!
ES7020029	Puntallana (official name: Puntallana); Other names: n/a	28.12746°N 17.11531°W	This Site of Community Interest has no photo. Take one and upload it! Thanks!
ES7020030	Majona (official name: Majona); Other names: n/a	28.14385°N 17.160439999999998°W	This Site of Community Interest has no photo. Take one and upload it! Thanks!
ES7020032	Roque Cano (official name: Roque Cano); Other names: n/a	28.18258°N 17.25764°W	Looks like this Site of Community Interest has an image. Don't worry, you can take one of your own, and upload it too!
ES7020033	Roque Blanco (official name: Roque Blanco); Other names: n/a	28.166120000000006°N 17.24561°W	This Site of Community Interest has no photo. Take one and upload it! Thanks!
ES7020034	La Fortaleza (official name: La Fortaleza); Other names: n/a	28.09964°N 17.275389999999998°W	Looks like this Site of Community Interest has an image. Don't worry, you can take one of your own, and upload it too!
ES7020035	Barranco del Cabrito (official name: Barranco del Cabrito); Other names: n/a	28.08185°N 17.15953°W	This Site of Community Interest has no photo. Take one and upload it! Thanks!
ES7020037	Lomo del Carretón (official name: Lomo del Carretón); Other names: n/a	28.1464°N 17.3175°W	This Site of Community Interest has no photo. Take one and upload it! Thanks!
ES7020039	Orone (official name: Orone); Other names: n/a	28.07828°N 17.26804°W	Looks like this Site of Community Interest has an image. Don't worry, you can take one of your own, and upload it too!
ES7020041	Charco del Conde (official name: Charco del Conde); Other names: n/a	28.08616°N 17.33776°W	Looks like this Site of Community Interest has an image. Don't worry, you can take one of your own, and upload it too!
ES7020042	Charco de Cieno (official name: Charco de Cieno); Other names: n/a	28.098000000000006°N 17.34747°W	This Site of Community Interest has no photo. Take one and upload it! Thanks!
ES7020043	Parque Nacional del Teide (official name: Parque Nacional del Teide); Other names: n/a	28.26468°N 16.61811°W	Looks like this Site of Community Interest has an image. Don't worry, you can take one of your own, and upload it too!
ES7020044	Ijuana (official name: Ijuana); Other names: n/a	28.5563°N 16.1381°W	Looks like this Site of Community Interest has an image. Don't worry, you can take one of your own, and upload it too!
ES7020045	Pijaral (official name: Pijaral); Other names: n/a	28.561120000000006°N 16.182579999999998°W	Looks like this Site of Community Interest has an image. Don't worry, you can take one of your own, and upload it too!
ES7020046	Los Roques de Anaga (official name: Los Roques de Anaga); Other names: n/a	28.59656°N 16.15854°W	Looks like this Site of Community Interest has an image. Don't worry, you can take one of your own, and upload it too!
ES7020047	Pinoleris (official name: Pinoleris); Other names: n/a	28.38626°N 16.48957°W	Looks like this Site of Community Interest has an image. Don't worry, you can take one of your own, and upload it too!
ES7020048	Malpaís de Güímar (official name: Malpaís de Güímar); Other names: n/a	28.30936°N 16.370929999999998°W	Looks like this Site of Community Interest has an image. Don't worry, you can take one of your own, and upload it too!
ES7020049	Montaña Roja (official name: Montaña Roja); Other names: n/a	28.03251°N 16.54801°W	Looks like this Site of Community Interest has an image. Don't worry, you can take one of your own, and upload it too!
ES7020050	Malpaís de la Rasca (official name: Malpaís de la Rasca); Other names: n/a	28.0113°N 16.69202°W	Looks like this Site of Community Interest has an image. Don't worry, you can take one of your own, and upload it too!
ES7020051	Barranco del Infierno (official name: Barranco del Infierno); Other names: n/a	28.12081°N 16.70818°W	Looks like this Site of Community Interest has an image. Don't worry, you can take one of your own, and upload it too!
ES7020052	Chinyero (official name: Chinyero); Other names: n/a	28.31258°N 16.77542°W	Looks like this Site of Community Interest has an image. Don't worry, you can take one of your own, and upload it too!
ES7020053	Las Palomas (official name: Las Palomas); Other names: n/a	28.40098°N 16.4587°W	This Site of Community Interest has no photo. Take one and upload it! Thanks!
ES7020054	Corona Forestal (official name: Corona Forestal); Other names: n/a	28.271040000000006°N 16.59861°W	Looks like this Site of Community Interest has an image. Don't worry, you can take one of your own, and upload it too!
ES7020055	Barranco de Fasnia y Güímar (official name: Barranco de Fasnia y Güímar); Other names: n/a	28.254490000000004°N 16.44492°W	This Site of Community Interest has no photo. Take one and upload it! Thanks!
ES7020056	Montaña Centinela (official name: Montaña Centinela); Other names: n/a	28.15502°N 16.45656°W	This Site of Community Interest has no photo. Take one and upload it! Thanks!
ES7020058	Montañas de Ifara y Los Riscos (official name: Montañas de Ifara y Los Riscos); Other names: n/a	28.08527°N 16.53194°W	Looks like this Site of Community Interest has an image. Don't worry, you can take one of your own, and upload it too!
ES7020061	Roque de Jama (official name: Roque de Jama); Other names: n/a	28.09072°N 16.64428°W	Looks like this Site of Community Interest has an image. Don't worry, you can take one of your own, and upload it too!
ES7020064	Los Sables (official name: Los Sables); Other names: n/a	28.80741°N 17.919439999999994°W	Looks like this Site of Community Interest has an image. Don't worry, you can take one of your own, and upload it too!
ES7020065	Montaña de Tejina (official name: Montaña de Tejina); Other names: n/a	28.19002°N 16.753610000000002°W	Looks like this Site of Community Interest has an image. Don't worry, you can take one of your own, and upload it too!
ES7020066	Roque de Garachico (official name: Roque de Garachico); Other names: n/a	28.37964°N 16.762539999999998°W	Looks like this Site of Community Interest has an image. Don't worry, you can take one of your own, and upload it too!
ES7020068	La Rambla de Castro (official name: La Rambla de Castro); Other names: n/a	28.39922°N 16.58544°W	Looks like this Site of Community Interest has an image. Don't worry, you can take one of your own, and upload it too!
ES7020069	Las Lagunetas (official name: Las Lagunetas); Other names: n/a	28.418570000000006°N 16.41844°W	Looks like this Site of Community Interest has an image. Don't worry, you can take one of your own, and upload it too!
ES7020070	Barranco de Erques (official name: Barranco de Erques); Other names: n/a	28.16419°N 16.7701°W	Looks like this Site of Community Interest has an image. Don't worry, you can take one of your own, and upload it too!
ES7020071	Montaña de la Centinela (official name: Montaña de la Centinela); Other names: n/a	28.61151°N 17.76739°W	Looks like this Site of Community Interest has an image. Don't worry, you can take one of your own, and upload it too!
ES7020072	Montaña de la Breña (official name: Montaña de la Breña); Other names: n/a	28.63346°N 17.78116°W	Looks like this Site of Community Interest has an image. Don't worry, you can take one of your own, and upload it too!
ES7020073	Los Acantilados de la Culata (official name: Los Acantilados de la Culata); Other names: n/a	28.3667°N 16.75058°W	Looks like this Site of Community Interest has an image. Don't worry, you can take one of your own, and upload it too!
ES7020074	Los Campeches, Tigaiga y Ruiz (official name: Los Campeches, Tigaiga y Ruiz); Other names: n/a	28.37169°N 16.61375°W	Looks like this Site of Community Interest has an image. Don't worry, you can take one of your own, and upload it too!
ES7020075	La Resbala (official name: La Resbala); Other names: n/a	28.38445°N 16.48761°W	Looks like this Site of Community Interest has an image. Don't worry, you can take one of your own, and upload it too!
ES7020076	Riscos de Bajamar (official name: Riscos de Bajamar); Other names: n/a	28.664720000000006°N 17.77042°W	This Site of Community Interest has no photo. Take one and upload it! Thanks!
ES7020077	Acantilado de la Hondura (official name: Acantilado de la Hondura); Other names: n/a	28.206570000000006°N 16.42212°W	Looks like this Site of Community Interest has an image. Don't worry, you can take one of your own, and upload it too!
ES7020078	Tabaibal del Porís (official name: Tabaibal del Porís); Other names: n/a	28.177090000000003°N 16.42935°W	This Site of Community Interest has no photo. Take one and upload it! Thanks!
ES7020081	Interián (official name: Interián); Other names: n/a	28.36356°N 16.79581°W	Looks like this Site of Community Interest has an image. Don't worry, you can take one of your own, and upload it too!
ES7020082	Barranco de Ruiz (official name: Barranco de Ruiz); Other names: n/a	28.38295°N 16.62575°W	Looks like this Site of Community Interest has an image. Don't worry, you can take one of your own, and upload it too!
ES7020084	Barlovento, Garafía, El Paso y Tijarafe (official name: Barlovento, Garafía, El Paso y Tijarafe); Other names: n/a	28.7605°N 17.8926°W	Looks like this Site of Community Interest has an image. Don't worry, you can take one of your own, and upload it too!
ES7020085	El Paso y Santa Cruz de La Palma (official name: El Paso y Santa Cruz de La Palma); Other names: n/a	28.67256°N 17.85444°W	This Site of Community Interest has no photo. Take one and upload it! Thanks!
ES7020086	Santa Cruz de La Palma (official name: Santa Cruz de La Palma); Other names: n/a	28.68829°N 17.81665°W	This Site of Community Interest has no photo. Take one and upload it! Thanks!
ES7020087	Breña Alta (official name: Breña Alta); Other names: n/a	28.62252°N 17.81898°W	This Site of Community Interest has no photo. Take one and upload it! Thanks!
ES7020088	Sabinar de Puntallana (official name: Sabinar de Puntallana); Other names: n/a	28.73763°N 17.73651°W	This Site of Community Interest has no photo. Take one and upload it! Thanks!
ES7020089	Sabinar de La Galga (official name: Sabinar de La Galga); Other names: n/a	28.772140000000004°N 17.76323°W	Looks like this Site of Community Interest has an image. Don't worry, you can take one of your own, and upload it too!
ES7020090	Monteverde de Don Pedro-Juan Adalid (official name: Monteverde de Don Pedro-Juan Adalid); Other names: n/a	28.82991°N 17.91104°W	This Site of Community Interest has no photo. Take one and upload it! Thanks!
ES7020091	Monteverde de Gallegos-Franceses (official name: Monteverde de Gallegos-Franceses); Other names: n/a	28.81154°N 17.840629999999994°W	This Site of Community Interest has no photo. Take one and upload it! Thanks!
ES7020092	Monteverde de Lomo Grande (official name: Monteverde de Lomo Grande); Other names: n/a	28.78191°N 17.79362°W	Looks like this Site of Community Interest has an image. Don't worry, you can take one of your own, and upload it too!
ES7020093	Monteverde de Barranco Seco-Barranco del Agua (official name: Monteverde de Barranco Seco-Barranco del Agua); Other names: n/a	28.73021°N 17.78193°W	This Site of Community Interest has no photo. Take one and upload it! Thanks!
ES7020094	Monteverde de Breña Alta (official name: Monteverde de Breña Alta); Other names: n/a	28.67256°N 17.811320000000006°W	This Site of Community Interest has no photo. Take one and upload it! Thanks!
ES7020095	Anaga (official name: Anaga); Other names: n/a	28.53789°N 16.23801°W	Looks like this Site of Community Interest has an image. Don't worry, you can take one of your own, and upload it too!
ES7020096	Teno (official name: Teno); Other names: n/a	28.31761°N 16.84855°W	Looks like this Site of Community Interest has an image. Don't worry, you can take one of your own, and upload it too!
ES7020097	Teselinde-Cabecera de Vallehermoso (official name: Teselinde-Cabecera de Vallehermoso); Other names: n/a	28.17905°N 17.276020000000006°W	This Site of Community Interest has no photo. Take one and upload it! Thanks!
ES7020098	Montaña del Cepo (official name: Montaña del Cepo); Other names: n/a	28.19248°N 17.22796°W	This Site of Community Interest has no photo. Take one and upload it! Thanks!
ES7020099	Frontera (official name: Frontera); Other names: n/a	27.71718°N 18.0584°W	Looks like this Site of Community Interest has an image. Don't worry, you can take one of your own, and upload it too!
ES7020100	Cueva del Viento (official name: Cueva del Viento); Other names: n/a	28.34369°N 16.70092°W	This Site of Community Interest has no photo. Take one and upload it! Thanks!
ES7020101	Laderas de Enchereda (official name: Laderas de Enchereda); Other names: n/a	28.15087°N 17.19086°W	This Site of Community Interest has no photo. Take one and upload it! Thanks!
ES7020102	Barranco de Charco Hondo (official name: Barranco de Charco Hondo); Other names: n/a	28.067120000000006°N 17.25167°W	This Site of Community Interest has no photo. Take one and upload it! Thanks!
ES7020103	Barranco de Argaga (official name: Barranco de Argaga); Other names: n/a	28.08601°N 17.320610000000002°W	This Site of Community Interest has no photo. Take one and upload it! Thanks!
ES7020104	Valle Alto de Valle Gran Rey (official name: Valle Alto de Valle Gran Rey); Other names: n/a	28.11618°N 17.31237°W	Looks like this Site of Community Interest has an image. Don't worry, you can take one of your own, and upload it too!
ES7020105	Barranco del Águila (official name: Barranco del Águila); Other names: n/a	28.137390000000003°N 17.1245°W	This Site of Community Interest has no photo. Take one and upload it! Thanks!
ES7020106	Cabecera Barranco de Aguajilva (official name: Cabecera Barranco de Aguajilva); Other names: n/a	28.12601°N 17.17719°W	This Site of Community Interest has no photo. Take one and upload it! Thanks!
ES7020107	Cuenca de Benchijigua-Guarimiar (official name: Cuenca de Benchijigua-Guarimiar); Other names: n/a	28.07262°N 17.2193°W	This Site of Community Interest has no photo. Take one and upload it! Thanks!
ES7020108	Taguluche (official name: Taguluche); Other names: n/a	28.13717°N 17.33239°W	This Site of Community Interest has no photo. Take one and upload it! Thanks!
ES7020109	Barrancos del Cedro y Liria (official name: Barrancos del Cedro y Liria); Other names: n/a	28.15566°N 17.2093°W	This Site of Community Interest has no photo. Take one and upload it! Thanks!
ES7020110	Barranco de Niágara (official name: Barranco de Niágara); Other names: n/a	28.1931°N 16.76649°W	This Site of Community Interest has no photo. Take one and upload it! Thanks!
ES7020111	Barranco de Orchilla (official name: Barranco de Orchilla); Other names: n/a	28.11153°N 16.60914°W	Looks like this Site of Community Interest has an image. Don't worry, you can take one of your own, and upload it too!
ES7020112	Barranco de las Hiedras-El Cedro (official name: Barranco de las Hiedras-El Cedro); Other names: n/a	28.19148°N 16.50081°W	This Site of Community Interest has no photo. Take one and upload it! Thanks!
ES7020113	Acantilado costero de Los Perros (official name: Acantilado costero de Los Perros); Other names: n/a	28.38747°N 16.698439999999998°W	This Site of Community Interest has no photo. Take one and upload it! Thanks!
ES7020114	Riscos de Lara (official name: Riscos de Lara); Other names: n/a	28.253590000000006°N 16.82°W	This Site of Community Interest has no photo. Take one and upload it! Thanks!
ES7020115	Laderas de Chío (official name: Laderas de Chío); Other names: n/a	28.25129°N 16.797179999999994°W	This Site of Community Interest has no photo. Take one and upload it! Thanks!
ES7020118	Barranco de Icor (official name: Barranco de Icor); Other names: n/a	28.21441°N 16.46735°W	This Site of Community Interest has no photo. Take one and upload it! Thanks!
ES7020119	Lomo de Las Eras (official name: Lomo de Las Eras); Other names: n/a	28.19856°N 16.42502°W	This Site of Community Interest has no photo. Take one and upload it! Thanks!
ES7020121	Barranco Madre del Agua (official name: Barranco Madre del Agua); Other names: n/a	28.21442°N 16.48027°W	This Site of Community Interest has no photo. Take one and upload it! Thanks!
ES7020127	Risco de la Mérica (official name: Risco de la Mérica); Other names: n/a	28.102390000000003°N 17.34271°W	Looks like this Site of Community Interest has an image. Don't worry, you can take one of your own, and upload it too!
ES7020129	Piña de mar de Granadilla (official name: Piña de mar de Granadilla); Other names: n/a	28.07374°N 16.50675°W	This Site of Community Interest has no photo. Take one and upload it! Thanks!

== See also ==
- List of Sites of Community Importance in Spain
