= 1995 reasons of the Supreme Court of Canada =

The list below consists of the reasons delivered from the bench by the Supreme Court of Canada during 1995. This list, however, does not include decisions on motions.

== Reasons ==
Delivered the Court's reason
Joined the Court's reason
Filed a concurrence
Joined a concurrence
Filed a dissent
Joined a dissent
Filed a concurrence/dissent
Joined a concurrence/dissent
Did not participate in the judgment
Did not participate in the final disposition of the judgment
Not a member of the Court at the time of hearing or delivering
- Decisions that do not note a Justice delivering the Court's reason are per coram.
- Multiple concurrences and dissents within a case are numbered, with joining votes numbered accordingly. Justices occasionally join multiple reasons in a single case; each vote is subdivided accordingly.
- Multiple unnumbered reasons are jointly written or delivered.
- Decisions that are given orally from the bench are denoted by a "V"; per coram decisions delivered orally from the bench only note a "V" on the most senior justice on the panel.
- An asterisk ( * ) in the Court's opinion denotes that it was only a majority in part or a plurality.

Case name	Argued	Decided	Lamer	La Forest	L'Heureux-Dubé	Sopinka	Gonthier	Cory	McLachlin	Iacobucci	Major
Ontario v. Canadian Pacific Ltd., [1995] 2 SCR 1028	January 24, 1995	January 24, 1995									
Canadian Pacific Ltd. v. Matsqui Indian Band, [1995] 1 SCR 3	October 11, 1994	January 26, 1995									
Winnipeg Condominium Corporation No. 36 v. Bird Construction Co., [1995] 1 SCR 85	October 12, 1994	January 26, 1995									
Stewart v. Pettie, [1995] 1 SCR 131	October 13, 1994	January 26, 1995									
Canadian Broadcasting Corp. v. Canada (Labour Relations Board), [1995] 1 SCR 157	March 14, 1994	January 27, 1995									
R. v. Dunn, [1995] 1 SCR 226	October 31, 1994	January 27, 1995									
R. v. Bernshaw, [1995] 1 SCR 254	October 7, 1994	January 27, 1995									
B. (R.) v. Children's Aid Society of Metropolitan Toronto, [1995] 1 SCR 315	March 17, 1994	January 27, 1995									
R. v. Halcrow, [1995] 1 SCR 440	March 17, 1994	January 27, 1995									
R. v. Laporte, [1995] 1 SCR 442	January 27, 1995	January 27, 1995									
R. v. Blenner-Hassett; R. v. Piluke, [1995] 1 SCR 443	January 31, 1995	January 31, 1995									
R. v. S. (R.J.), [1995] 1 SCR 451	February 28 and March 1, 1994	February 2, 1995									
R. v. Simpson, [1995] 1 S.C.R. 449	February 3, 1995	February 3, 1995									
T. (M.) v. A. (H.), [1995] 1 S.C.R. 445	February 6, 1995	February 6, 1995									
R. v. Lord, [1995] 1 S.C.R. 747	February 21, 1995	February 21, 1995									
Case name	Argued	Decided	Lamer	La Forest	L'Heureux-Dubé	Sopinka	Gonthier	Cory	McLachlin	Iacobucci	Major
R. v. B. (W.R.), [1995] 1 S.C.R. 750	February 22, 1995	February 22, 1995									
R. v. Barrett, [1995] 1 S.C.R. 752	February 22, 1995	February 22, 1995									
White Resource Management Ltd. v. Durish, [1995] 1 S.C.R. 633	October 6, 1994	February 23, 1995									
R. v. Lepage, [1995] 1 S.C.R. 654	November 10, 1994	February 23, 1995									
R. v. McIntosh, [1995] 1 S.C.R. 686	November 28, 1994	February 23, 1995									
Chen v. Canada (Minister of Employment and Immigration) - [1995] 1 S.C.R. 725	February 3, 1995	February 23, 1995									
R. v. Chaplin, [1995] 1 S.C.R. 727	October 6, 1994	February 23, 1995									
R. v. Stinchcombe, [1995] 1 S.C.R. 754	February 23, 1995	February 23, 1995									
R. v. Moore, [1995] 1 S.C.R. 756	February 24, 1995	February 24, 1995	V								
R. v. D. (W.R.) - [1995] 1 S.C.R. 758	February 28, 1995	February 28, 1995									
R. v. Biddle, [1995] 1 S.C.R. 761	October 14, 1994	March 2, 1995									
R. v. St. Pierre, [1995] 1 S.C.R. 791	December 2, 1994	March 2, 1995									
R. v. Tempelaar - [1995] 1 S.C.R. 760	March 3, 1995	March 3, 1995									
R. v. Goddard - [1995] 1 S.C.R. 854	March 20, 1995	March 20, 1995									
R. v. Hawrish - [1995] 1 S.C.R. 856	March 21, 1995	March 21, 1995									
Case name	Argued	Decided	Lamer	La Forest	L'Heureux-Dubé	Sopinka	Gonthier	Cory	McLachlin	Iacobucci	Major
R. v. MacGillivray - [1995] 1 S.C.R. 890	February 23, 1995	March 30, 1995									
R. v. Crawford - [1995] 1 S.C.R. 858	November 4, 1994	March 30, 1995									
R. v. Curragh Inc. - [1995] 1 S.C.R. 900	April 5, 1995	April 5, 1995									
R. v. Mills, [1995] 1 S.C.R. 902	April 12, 1995	April 12, 1995									
R. v. Jobin, [1995] 2 S.C.R. 78	February 28 and March 1, 1994	April 13, 1995									
R. v. Primeau, [1995] 2 S.C.R. 60	February 28 and March 1, 1994	April 13, 1995									
British Columbia Securities Commission v. Branch, [1995] 2 S.C.R. 3	February 28 and March 1, 1994	April 13, 1995									
Mitsui & Co. (Canada) Ltd. v. Royal Bank of Canada - [1995] 2 S.C.R. 187	March 1, 1995	May 4, 1995									
Phillips v. Nova Scotia (Commission of Inquiry into the Westray Mine Tragedy) - [1995] 2 S.C.R. 97	May 31 and June 1, 1994	May 4, 1995									
R. v. Keegstra, [1995] 2 S.C.R. 381	February 6, 1995	May 18, 1995									
R. v. Tanner - [1995] 2 S.C.R. 379	April 26, 1995	May 18, 1995									
R. v. Silveira, [1995] 2 S.C.R. 297	November 9, 1994	May 18, 1995									
R. v. Burlingham - [1995] 2 S.C.R. 206	November 9, 1994	May 18, 1995									
Walker v. Prince Edward Island - [1995] 2 S.C.R. 407	May 23, 1995	May 23, 1995									
Miron v. Trudel, [1995] 2 SCR 418	June 2, 1994	May 25, 1995									
Case name	Argued	Decided	Lamer	La Forest	L'Heureux-Dubé	Sopinka	Gonthier	Cory	McLachlin	Iacobucci	Major
Egan v. Canada, [1995] 2 SCR 513	November 1, 1994	May 25, 1995									
Thibaudeau v. Canada, [1995] 2 SCR 627	October 4, 1994	May 25, 1995									
R. v. S. (G.), [1995] 2 SCR 411	May 26, 1995	May 26, 1995									
R. v. B. (A.J.), [1995] 2 SCR 413	May 29, 1995	May 29, 1995									
R. v. M. (N.), [1995] 2 SCR 415	May 30, 1995	May 30, 1995									
R. v. Montour, [1995] 2 SCR 416	May 30, 1995	May 30, 1995									
R. v. Wade, [1995] 2 SCR 737	June 2, 1995	June 2, 1995									
British Columbia Telephone Co. v. Shaw Cable Systems (B.C.) Ltd., [1995] 2 SCR 739	January 23, 1995	June 22, 1995									
Telecommunications Workers Union v. Canada (Radio-television and Telecommunications Commission), [1995] 2 SCR 781	January 23, 1995	June 22, 1995									
Crown Forest Industries Ltd. v. Canada, [1995] 2 SCR 802	March 2, 1995	June 22, 1995									
R. v. Park, [1995] 2 SCR 836	December 7, 1994	June 22, 1995									
Vout v. Hay, [1995] 2 SCR 876	January 26, 1995	June 22, 1995									
British Columbia (Milk Board) v. Grisnich, [1995] 2 SCR 895	April 25, 1995	June 22, 1995									
R. v. Crosby, [1995] 2 SCR 912	April 24, 1995	June 22, 1995									
Weber v. Ontario Hydro, [1995] 2 SCR 929	December 6, 1994	June 29, 1995									
Case name	Argued	Decided	Lamer	La Forest	L'Heureux-Dubé	Sopinka	Gonthier	Cory	McLachlin	Iacobucci	Major
New Brunswick v. O'Leary, [1995] 2 SCR 967	December 6, 1994	June 29, 1995									
R. v. Hibbert, [1995] 2 SCR 973	January 30, 1995	July 20, 1995									
Ontario v. Canadian Pacific Ltd., [1995] 2 SCR 1031	January 24, 1995	July 20, 1995									
Cie minière Québec Cartier v. Quebec (Grievances arbitrator), [1995] 2 SCR 1095	May 5, 1995	July 20, 1995									
R. v. Collins; R. v. Pelfrey, [1995] 2 SCR 1104	June 12, 1995	July 20, 1995									
R. v. Chaisson, [1995] 2 SCR 1118	June 15, 1995	July 20, 1995									
Hill v. Church of Scientology of Toronto, [1995] 2 SCR 1130	February 20, 1995	July 20, 1995									
Botiuk v. Toronto Free Press Publications Ltd., [1995] 3 SCR 3	December 8, 1994	September 21, 1995									
R. v. Pontes, [1995] 3 SCR 44	February 28, 1995	September 21, 1995									
Friesen v. Canada, [1995] 3 SCR 103	March 1, 1995	September 21, 1995									
R. v. Cleghorn, [1995] 3 SCR 175	April 24, 1995	September 21, 1995									
RJR-MacDonald Inc. v. Canada (Attorney General), [1995] 3 SCR 199	November 29, 30, 1994	September 21, 1995									
G. (L.) v. B. (G.), [1995] 3 SCR 370	March 2, 1995	September 21, 1995									
Amos v. Insurance Corp. of British Columbia, [1995] 3 SCR 405	May 25, 1995	September 21, 1995									
R. v. Wijesinha, [1995] 3 SCR 422	May 31, 1995	September 21, 1995									
Case name	Argued	Decided	Lamer	La Forest	L'Heureux-Dubé	Sopinka	Gonthier	Cory	McLachlin	Iacobucci	Major
Cohnstaedt v. University of Regina, [1995] 3 SCR 451	October 12, 1995	October 12, 1995									
Husky Oil Operations Ltd. v. Minister of National Revenue, [1995] 3 SCR 453	January 25, 1995	October 19, 1995									
R. v. Harrer, [1995] 3 SCR 562	March 3, 1995	October 19, 1995									
Chan v. Canada (Minister of Employment and Immigration), [1995] 3 SCR 593	January 31, 1995	October 19, 1995									
Ter Neuzen v. Korn, [1995] 3 SCR 674	February 2, 1995	October 19, 1995									
Large v. Stratford (City), [1995] 3 SCR 733	February 27, 1995	October 19, 1995									
R. v. U. (F.J.), [1995] 3 SCR 764	April 26, 1995	October 19, 1995									
Fire v. Longtin, [1995] 4 SCR 3	October 4, 1995	October 19, 1995									
Blair v. Consolidated Enfield Corp., [1995] 4 SCR 5	March 21, 1995	October 19, 1995									
R. v. Patriquen, [1995] 4 SCR 42	October 30, 1995	October 30, 1995									
R. v. Polo, [1995] 4 SCR 44	November 2, 1995	November 2, 1995									
R. v. Mathieu, [1995] 4 SCR 46	November 2, 1995	November 2, 1995									
R. v. Fleurant, [1995] 4 SCR 47	November 2, 1995	November 2, 1995									
R. v. Rogalsky, [1995] 4 SCR 48	November 7, 1995	November 7, 1995									
R. v. Marc, [1995] 4 SCR 50	November 7, 1995	November 7, 1995									
Case name	Argued	Decided	Lamer	La Forest	L'Heureux-Dubé	Sopinka	Gonthier	Cory	McLachlin	Iacobucci	Major
R. v. W. (A.), [1995] 4 SCR 51	November 10, 1995	November 10, 1995									
R. v. Munroe, [1995] 4 SCR 53	November 10, 1995	November 10, 1995									
R. v. Jorgensen, [1995] 4 SCR 55	February 21, 1995	November 16, 1995									
R. v. Livermore, [1995] 4 SCR 123	March 22, 1995	November 16, 1995									
R. v. Fitzpatrick, [1995] 4 SCR 154	March 22, 1995	November 16, 1995									
R. v. K. (B.), [1995] 4 SCR 186	October 3, 1995	November 16, 1995									
R. v. Khela, [1995] 4 SCR 201	May 24, 1995	November 16, 1995									
R. v. Shropshire, [1995] 4 SCR 227	June 15, 1995	November 16, 1995									
R. v. Brydon, [1995] 4 SCR 253	October 11, 1995	November 16, 1995									
R. v. Hinse, [1995] 4 SCR 597	October 2, 1995	November 30, 1995									
Ruffo v. Conseil de la magistrature, [1995] 4 SCR 267	March 23, 1995	December 14, 1995									
Blueberry River Indian Band v. Canada (Department of Indian Affairs and Northern Development), [1995] 4 SCR 344	June 13, 14, 1995	December 14, 1995									
R. v. O'Connor, [1995] 4 SCR 411	February 1, 1995	December 14, 1995									
A. (L.L.) v. B. (A.), [1995] 4 SCR 536	June 16, 1995	December 14, 1995									
P. (M.) v. L.B. (G.), [1995] 4 SCR 592	December 7, 1995	December 14, 1995									
Case name	Argued	Decided	Lamer	La Forest	L'Heureux-Dubé	Sopinka	Gonthier	Cory	McLachlin	Iacobucci	Major
MacMillan Bloedel Ltd. v. Simpson, [1995] 4 SCR 725	June 12, 1995	December 14, 1995									
Hollis v. Dow Corning Corp., [1995] 4 SCR 634	February 2, 1995	December 21, 1995									
R. v. Adams, [1995] 4 SCR 707	October 6, 1995	December 21, 1995									
