= Barry Davies (disambiguation) =

Barry Davies (born 1937) is a British sports commentator.

Barry Davies may also refer to:

- Barry Davies (rugby union, born 1981), Welsh rugby union footballer
- Barry Davies (rugby union, born 1875), Wales international rugby player, capped 1896
- Barry Davies (British Army soldier) (1944–2016), British Army infantry soldier
- Barry M. Davies (born 1947), judge in the Supreme Court of British Columbia

== See also ==
- Barry Davis (disambiguation)
