= Roderick P. Wacowich =

Canadian lawyer

Supreme Court of Alberta

Personal details
- Born: March 2, 1949
- Education: Bachelor of Arts (1970); Bachelor of Laws (1972)
- Alma mater: University of Alberta

Roderick Phillip Wacowich is a former Canadian Master in Chambers in the Court of Queen's Bench of Alberta.

== Career ==
Roderick P. Wacowich joined the Bar of Alberta in 1975. (Note: In 2003, the Edmonton Journal reported "Wacowich has been with Alberta Justice for 28 years.") Throughout the 1970s, he worked as a lawyer for the office of the Solicitor General of Alberta, which was then known as the Attorney General of Alberta. In the 1980s, Wacowich worked as a crown agent in the Court of Queen's Bench of Alberta.

In April 1985, a previously completed inquiry into the death of James Townshend was reopened following the introduction of new evidence by Wacowich. After Townshend attempted an armed robbery in Edmonton's Abbottsfield Mall, he was shot and killed by Edmonton police. The Edmonton Police Service claimed that Townshend raised and pointed a shotgun toward them, prompting police retaliation; however, Wacowich obtained a letter written by a police informant which questioned the accuracy of the police narrative.

Throughout the 1980s, Wacowich supported the anti-abortion movement; in 1983, Wacowich signed the Right-To-Life Signature Proclamation, an Alberta anti-abortion petition, and in 1987, the Edmonton Journal reported that Wacowich was challenging anti-abortion doctors in court. When Albertan doctors began charging fees for abortion referral letters in 1987, the Edmonton Journal reported that "Wacowich said the $84.50 fee covered everything involved with securing the therapeutic abortion, and he questioned the doctors' desire to charge for the letter. 'What will they start charging for next – Band-Aids?' he asked."

Throughout the 1990s, Wacowich served as the Assistant Deputy Minister for Alberta Court Services.

In 2003, Wacowich became a Master in Chambers for Alberta Justice. He retired on February 28, 2019.

== Notable trials ==
In June 1985, Wacowich represented Canadian psychologist Louise Nadeau in McNair v Nadeau et al.

In 2018, he delivered judgement in Woitas v Tremblay and cited Kuipers v Gordon Riley Transport for Samuel Sereth Lieberman's dismissal of the plaintiff's suggestion that "the actions of the other drivers established a 'chain of causation' leading up to the collision involving the plaintiff."
