= Benchijigua Express =

Spanish ferry built in 2005

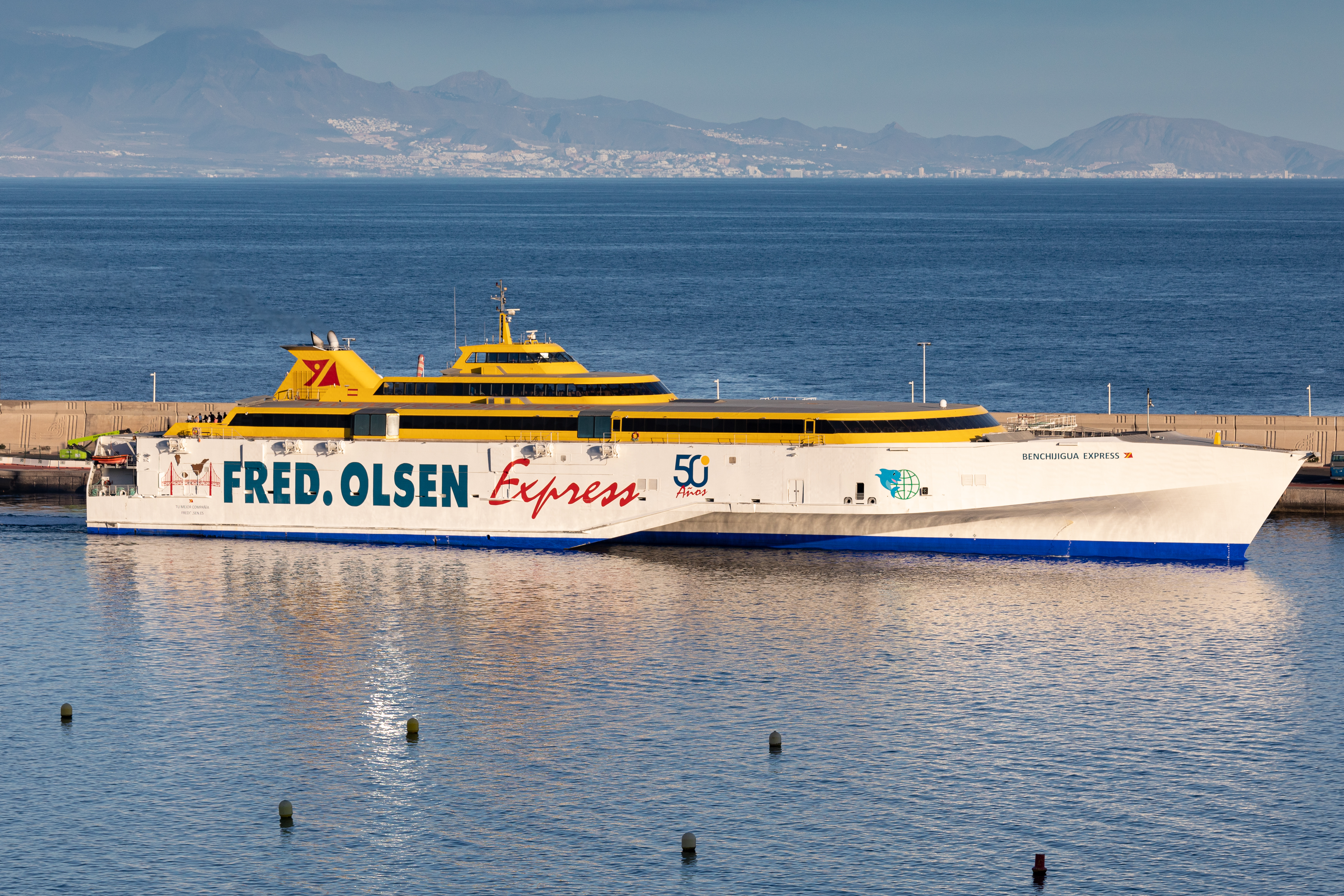
- Benchijigua Express

History

Spain
- Name: Benchijigua Express
- Owner: Fred Olsen Express
- Operator: Fred Olsen Express
- Port of registry: Santa Cruz de Tenerife
- Builder: Austal
- Yard number: H260
- Laid down: 11 November 2003
- Launched: 25 September 2004
- Christened: 5 November 2004
- Completed: 12 April 2005
- Identification: Call sign: ECHP; IMO number: 9299056; MMSI number: 224441000; DNV ID: G110920
- Status: In service
- Notes: HSC-Passenger B

General characteristics
- Tonnage: 3,504 GT
- Length: 126.0 m (413 ft 5 in)
- Beam: 30.4 m (99 ft 9 in)
- Draught: 4.06 m (13 ft 4 in)
- Installed power: 4 MTU diesel, 36,400 kW (48,800 hp) in total
- Propulsion: 3 Jet type propellers
- Speed: 36 knots (67 km/h; 41 mph)
- Capacity: 1,350 passengers; 337 vehicles
- Crew: 22

Benchijigua Express is a fast ferry, operated by Fred. Olsen Express between the Canary Islands, Tenerife, La Gomera and La Palma in the Atlantic Ocean. She was delivered in April 2005. At 126 metres (413 ft 5 in) long, the ferry is the second-longest type of trimaran in the world, less than 2 metres (6 ft 7 in) shy of the littoral combat ships of the Independence-class littoral combat ship which were based on Benchijigua Express's design. Her hull is made of aluminium with a special offshore coating, and is the second-largest vessel with an aluminium hull, again after the Independence-class. The ship's name, derived from the village of Benchijigua on La Gomera where Fredrik Olsen had property, was previously used twice since 1999.

== Design and construction ==
Benchijigua Express was built by Austal in Henderson, Western Australia. The vessel is 126.65 metres (415 ft 6 in) long, 30.4 metres (99 ft 9 in) wide, and has a draught of 4 metres (13 ft 1 in). She can reach speeds of 42 knots (78 km/h; 48 mph), although her normal service speed is 36 knots (67 km/h; 41 mph).

The vessel is powered by four diesel engines of MTU Series 8000 (20V 8000 M71L), each with 9,100 kilowatts (12,200 hp) at 1,150 rpm driven electric generators, housed in two engine rooms. Each of the two diesels in the rear engine-room drive one Kamewa 125 SII steerable waterjet propulsion from Rolls-Royce. The overall performance of both machines at the front engine room is transferred to a Kamewa 180 BII booster waterjet. The electrical energy is generated by four MTU 12V 2000 M40 generator units.

Up to 1,291 passengers are distributed on two decks. Due to the short crossing time, there are no passenger cabins. For vehicle transport there are 123 car spaces and 450 metres (1,480 ft) of truck lane; the latter can be converted into an additional 218 car spaces. The vehicle deck can be loaded and unloaded in 30 minutes.

== Predecessor ==
The ship's name is now used for the third time since 1999. The first Benchijigua Express (IMO number: 9206712) was entered into service in 1999 and renamed Bencomo Express later in 1999. The second Benchijigua Express (IMO No: 9213337) started its service between Los Cristianos and San Sebastián in January 2000. In November 2004 she was renamed Bentago Express to free the name for this vessel.

== Related designs ==
Austal and General Dynamics based the hull design of the Independence-class littoral combat ship on the Benchijigua Express design.
