= Loki 7 bombings =

Roger Charles Bell is a Canadian former secondary school teacher and convicted criminal from Prince Edward Island. Born in Murray River in 1944, Bell is a graduate of University of Western Ontario and taught high school chemistry at several schools in eastern Prince Edward Island.

== Criminal conviction ==
Bell was arrested in 1997 and charged in connection with a series of pipe bomb explosions in Charlottetown, Prince Edward Island, and Halifax, Nova Scotia, dating from 1988 to 1996. During this time, a series of communications to media and law enforcement officials claimed that the bombings were undertaken by a group calling itself "Loki 7". Bell was convicted in 1997 by Chief Justice Armand DesRoches on charges of exploding four pipe bombs over a period of eight years and was given a nine-year sentence which he served at the Springhill Institution in Nova Scotia.

== Bombings ==
A pipe bomb exploded outside the Sir Louis Henry Davies Law Courts in Charlottetown in October 1988. The bomb was obscured in a flower bed and exploded at 0600, causing no structural damage, although windows were broken and damage was sustained to the law library.

After a 6-year lull, a pipe bomb planted in a trash can in Halifax's Point Pleasant Park was discovered in 1994. Law enforcement were alerted and the bomb was defused with no damage being reported.

On April 20, 1995, one day after the Oklahoma City bombing attack, a powerful pipe bomb that was planted under a wood-framed wheelchair ramp on the north side of Province House in Charlottetown exploded in the mid-morning hours. The explosion occurred several minutes after a class of school children had passed through the area. Over 20 windows were damaged on the building and shrapnel and debris was thrown around the area. One injury was reported by an individual sitting on a nearby park bench who received a broken ankle and severed blood vessels from the shrapnel and the shockwave. After this explosion, police and media (ATV News) received the first communiqué from "Loki 7".

On June 25, 1996, the Prince Edward Island station of the Canadian Broadcasting Corporation (CBC) received a warning from "Loki 7" about a bomb located at a nearby propane terminal. Law enforcement evacuated the surrounding area and discovered the device affixed to a large above-ground propane storage tank. Several empty garbage trucks were placed around the tank to shield potential blast effects and police bomb squads removed the device using a water cannon. It exploded but did not cause any damage to the propane terminal or other equipment.

== Investigation ==
Law enforcement had no leads following the 1988 and 1994 bombings, although the 1988 case had received much speculation from local residents who thought it might be linked to organized crime. It was not until after the 1995 bombing at Province House that all three were linked together.

== Communiqués ==
Communications from "Loki 7" were taken seriously, but with suspicion, since most of the information could have been gleaned from media reports. Police were also puzzled by how long it took the bomber or bombers to claim credit for each action.

The name Loki 7 was also a source of consternation. Police knew that Loki was the Norse god of mischief. As with previous correspondence from "Loki 7", the swastika-emblazoned missive ended with the declaration "Heil, Thor."

Given the odd nature of the letters it was considered by some investigators to be a prank, rather than actual contact from the bombers. This changed after the 1996 bombing when a letter from "Loki 7" described precisely where to find a bomb that had been left at the propane terminal.

Each letter contained references to "venal injustice officials" and "crypto-Zionist producers" but revealed little about potential motives. Despite some of the neo-Nazi rhetoric, police were not led to believe that "Loki 7" represented a white supremacist group.

The Charlottetown Police Department, along with major crime investigators and criminal profilers with the Royal Canadian Mounted Police (RCMP), assembled a task force to solve the case. Prior to the 1996 propane terminal bombing, Charlottetown Police had 3 investigators working on the file and this was increased to 6 personnel with an unconfirmed number from the RCMP.

Roger Bell had gained the interest of Charlottetown Police following the 1988 bombing, but he had been one of many at the time and given the 6-year lull (7 on Prince Edward Island) in activity, he received less interest over time. Less than one month after the 1996 bombing, the joint task force had narrowed the field of suspects which again included Bell. He was placed under 24-hour surveillance that August and arrested that fall.

Bell pleaded guilty and was convicted the following year and sentenced to nine years in a federal penitentiary. He was released for parole in 2006.

== Motive ==
When Bell was caught, he did not reveal his motives until a 2002 appearance before the National Parole Board, when Bell said, "I think my mission was simply revenge at society."

== See also ==
- Unabomber
