= Alec T. Murray =

Canadian judge (1932–2021)

The Honourable Alec Thirlwell Murray QC

Justice of the Court of Queen’s Bench of Alberta
- In office 1987–2007

Personal details
- Born: 1932 Medicine Hat, Alberta, Canada
- Died: July 16, 2021 (aged 88–89) Edmonton, Alberta, Canada
- Education: University of Alberta
- Occupation: Judge
- Profession: Lawyer
- Known for: Dickason v University of Alberta (1991)

Alec Thirlwell Murray (1932 – July 16, 2021) was a Canadian lawyer and judge who served as a Justice of the Court of Queen’s Bench of Alberta. Before his appointment to the bench in 1987, Murray was a prominent Edmonton litigator with the law firm Parlee McLaws, where he was appointed Queen’s Counsel and served as a Bencher of the Law Society of Alberta.

== Early life ==
Born in Medicine Hat, Alberta, Murray grew up in Lethbridge and later moved to Edmonton, where he attended Victoria Composite High School. He earned a Bachelor of Commerce and a Bachelor of Laws from the University of Alberta, where he was active in the Delta Upsilon fraternity.

== Career ==
As a lawyer, Murray appeared in a number of notable Alberta cases, including Kuipers v Gordon Riley Transport and Sonnenberg Inc. v Stewart, Smith. After his appointment to the Court of Queen’s Bench, he presided over a number of significant decisions, such as Dickason v University of Alberta, which pertained to mandatory retirement and age discrimination.

== Personal life ==
Outside his legal career, Murray was active in community and sports organizations, serving as president of the Edmonton Huskies football club and participating in the Edmonton Downtown Rotary Club. He retired from the bench at age 75 and died in Edmonton in 2021.

== See also ==
- Dickason v University of Alberta
- Kuipers v Gordon Riley Transport
- Sonnenberg Inc. v Stewart, Smith
