= 2002 reasons of the Supreme Court of Canada =

The table below lists the reasons delivered from the bench by the Supreme Court of Canada during 2002. The table illustrates what reasons were filed by each justice in each case, and which justices joined each reason. This list, however, does not include decisions on motions.

Of the 86 judgments released in 2002, 10 were oral, 56 were unanimous, and none were motions.

== Judgments and reasons ==
| Case name | Argued | Decided | McLachlin | L'Heureux- Dubé | Gonthier | Iacobucci | Major | Bastarache | Binnie | Arbour | LeBel | Deschamps |
|---|---|---|---|---|---|---|---|---|---|---|---|---|
| Suresh v Canada (Minister of Citizenship and Immigration), [2002] 1 S.C.R. 3; 2002 SCC 1 | May 11, 2001 | January 11, 2002 | | | | | | | | | | |
| Ahani v Canada (Minister of Citizenship and Immigration), [2002] 1 S.C.R. 72; 2002 SCC 2 | May 11, 2001 | January 11, 2002 | | | | | | | | | | |
| Chieu v Canada (Minister of Citizenship and Immigration), [2002] 1 S.C.R. 84; 2002 SCC 3 | October 10, 2000 | January 11, 2002 | | | | | | | | | | |
| Al Sagban v Canada (Minister of Citizenship and Immigration), [2002] 1 S.C.R. 133; 2002 SCC 4 | October 10, 2000 | January 11, 2002 | | | | | | | | | | |
| R v Benji, [2002] 1 S.C.R. 142; 2002 SCC 5 | January 15, 2002 | January 15, 2002 | | | | | | | | V | | |
| R v Tessier, [2002] 1 S.C.R. 144; 2002 SCC 6 | January 18, 2002 | January 18, 2002 | | | | V | | | | | | |
| Bank of Montreal v Dynex Petroleum Ltd, [2002] 1 S.C.R. 146; 2002 SCC 7 | November 9, 2001 | January 24, 2002 | | | | | | | | | | |
| Retail, Wholesale and Department Store Union, Local 558 v Pepsi-Cola Canada Beverages (West) Ltd, [2002] 1 S.C.R. 156; 2002 SCC 8 | October 31, 2001 | January 24, 2002 | | | | | | | | | | |
| Krangle (Guardian ad litem of) v Brisco, [2002] 1 S.C.R. 205; 2002 SCC 9 | October 3, 2001 | January 24, 2002 | | | | | | | | | | |
| R v Law, [2002] 1 S.C.R. 227; 2002 SCC 10 | October 4, 2001 | February 7, 2002 | | | | | | | | | | |
| Case name | Argued | Decided | McLachlin | L'Heureux- Dubé | Gonthier | Iacobucci | Major | Bastarache | Binnie | Arbour | LeBel | Deschamps |
| Moreau-Bérubé v New Brunswick (Judicial Council), [2002] 1 S.C.R. 249; 2002 SCC 11 | June 19, 2001 | February 7, 2002 | | | | | | | | | | |
| R v Regan, [2002] 1 S.C.R. 297; 2002 SCC 12 | March 15, 2001 | February 14, 2002 | | | | | | | | | | |
| Mackin v New Brunswick (Minister of Finance); Rice v New Brunswick, [2002] 1 S.C.R. 405; 2002 SCC 13 | May 23, 2001 | February 14, 2002 | | | | | | | | | | |
| R v Guignard, [2002] 1 S.C.R. 472; 2002 SCC 14 | October 3, 2001 | February 21, 2002 | | | | | | | | | | |
| St-Jean v Mercier, [2002] 1 S.C.R. 491; 2002 SCC 15 | April 18, 2001 | February 21, 2002 | | | | | | | | | | |
| R v Fliss, [2002] 1 S.C.R. 535; 2002 SCC 16 | April 23, 2001 | February 21, 2002 | | | | | | | | | | |
| Ward v Canada (AG), [2002] 1 S.C.R. 569; 2002 SCC 17 | October 31, 2001 | February 22, 2002 | | | | | | | | | | |
| Whiten v Pilot Insurance Co, [2002] 1 S.C.R. 595; 2002 SCC 18 | December 14, 2000 | February 22, 2002 | | | | | | | | | | |
| Performance Industries Ltd v Sylvan Lake Golf & Tennis Club Ltd, [2002] 1 S.C.R. 678; 2002 SCC 19 | December 14, 2000 | February 22, 2002 | | | | | | | | | | |
| Bannon v Thunder Bay (City of), [2002] 1 S.C.R. 716; 2002 SCC 20 | February 21, 2002 | February 21, 2002 | | | | V | | | | | | |
| Case name | Argued | Decided | McLachlin | L'Heureux- Dubé | Gonthier | Iacobucci | Major | Bastarache | Binnie | Arbour | LeBel | Deschamps |
| Goulet v Transamerica Life Insurance Co of Canada, [2002] 1 S.C.R. 719; 2002 SCC 21 | November 8, 2001 | March 8, 2002 | | | | | | | | | | |
| Oldfield v Transamerica Life Insurance Co of Canada, [2002] 1 S.C.R. 742; 2002 SCC 22 | November 8, 2001 | March 8, 2002 | | | | | | | | | | |
| Lavoie v Canada, [2002] 1 S.C.R. 769; 2002 SCC 23 | June 12, 2001 | March 8, 2002 | | | | | | | | 1 | 2 | |
| R v Mac, [2002] 1 S.C.R. 856; 2002 SCC 24 | March 14, 2002 | March 14, 2002 | | | | | | V | | | | |
| R v Lamy, [2002] 1 S.C.R. 860; 2002 SCC 25 | February 12, 2002 | March 21, 2002 | | | | | | | | | | |
| R v Sheppard, [2002] 1 S.C.R. 869; 2002 SCC 26 | June 21, 2001 | March 21, 2002 | | | | | | | | | | |
| R v Braich, [2002] 1 S.C.R. 903; 2002 SCC 27 | June 21, 2001 | March 21, 2002 | | | | | | | | | | |
| Sarvanis v Canada, [2002] 1 S.C.R. 921; 2002 SCC 28 | October 10, 2001 | March 21, 2002 | | | | | | | | | | |
| R v Cinous, [2002] 2 S.C.R. 3; 2002 SCC 29 | April 18, 2001 | March 21, 2002 | | | | | | | | | | |
| Smith v Co-operators General Insurance Co, [2002] 2 S.C.R. 129; 2002 SCC 30 | November 6, 2001 | March 28, 2002 | | | | | | | | | | |
| Case name | Argued | Decided | McLachlin | L'Heureux- Dubé | Gonthier | Iacobucci | Major | Bastarache | Binnie | Arbour | LeBel | Deschamps |
| Kitkatla Band v British Columbia (Minister of Small Business, Tourism and Culture), [2002] 2 S.C.R. 146; 2002 SCC 31 | November 2, 2001 | March 28, 2002 | | | | | | | | | | |
| R v Brown, [2002] 2 S.C.R. 185; 2002 SCC 32 | January 23, 2002 | March 28, 2002 | | | | | | | | | | |
| Housen v Nikolaisen, [2002] 2 S.C.R. 235; 2002 SCC 33 | October 2, 2001 | March 28, 2002 | | | | | | | | | | |
| Théberge v Galerie d'Art du Petit Champlain inc, [2002] 2 S.C.R. 336; 2002 SCC 34 | October 11, 2001 | March 28, 2002 | | | | | | | | | | |
| R v Carlos, [2002] 2 S.C.R. 411; 2002 SCC 35 | April 17, 2002 | April 17, 2002 | | | | | | | | V | | |
| R v VCAS, [2002] 2 S.C.R. 414; 2002 SCC 36 | April 17, 2002 | April 17, 2002 | | | | | | | | | | |
| R v SGF, [2002] 2 S.C.R. 416; 2002 SCC 37 | April 22, 2002 | April 22, 2002 | | | V | | | | | | | |
| Gronnerud (Litigation Guardians of) v Gronnerud Estate, [2002] 2 S.C.R. 417; 2002 SCC 38 | December 6, 2001 | April 25, 2002 | | | | | | | | | | |
| R v Hibbert, [2002] 2 S.C.R. 445; 2002 SCC 39 | October 10, 2001 | April 25, 2002 | | | | | | | | | | |
| Berry v Pulley, [2002] 2 S.C.R. 493; 2002 SCC 40 | October 30, 2001 | April 25, 2002 | | | | | | | | | | |
| Case name | Argued | Decided | McLachlin | L'Heureux- Dubé | Gonthier | Iacobucci | Major | Bastarache | Binnie | Arbour | LeBel | Deschamps |
| Sierra Club of Canada v Canada (Minister of Finance), [2002] 2 S.C.R. 522; 2002 SCC 41 | November 6, 2001 | April 26, 2002 | | | | | | | | | | |
| Bell Express Vu Limited Partnership v Rex, [2002] 2 S.C.R. 559; 2002 SCC 42 | December 4, 2001 | April 26, 2002 | | | | | | | | | | |
| Bank of America Canada v Mutual Trust Co, [2002] 2 S.C.R. 601; 2002 SCC 43 | December 11, 2001 | April 26, 2002 | | | | | | | | | | |
| Tremblay v Syndicat des employées et employés professionnels-les et de bureau, section locale 57, [2002] 2 S.C.R. 627; 2002 SCC 44 | February 13, 2002 | April 26, 2002 | | | | | | | | | | |
| R v Robicheau, [2002] 2 S.C.R. 643; 2002 SCC 45 | May 21, 2002 | May 21, 2002 | | | | V | | | | | | |
| Stewart v Canada, [2002] 2 S.C.R. 645; 2002 SCC 46 | December 12, 2001 | May 23, 2002 | | | | | | | | | | |
| Walls v Canada, [2002] 2 S.C.R. 684; 2002 SCC 47 | December 12, 2001 | May 23, 2002 | | | | | | | | | | |
| Family Insurance Corp v Lombard Canada Ltd, [2002] 2 S.C.R. 695; 2002 SCC 48 | February 19, 2002 | May 23, 2002 | | | | | | | | | | |
| First Vancouver Finance v MRN, [2002] 2 S.C.R. 720; 2002 SCC 49 | March 12, 2002 | May 23, 2002 | | | | | | | | | | |
| Heredi v Fensom, [2002] 2 S.C.R. 741; 2002 SCC 50 | February 18, 2002 | May 23, 2002 | | | | | | | | | | |
| Case name | Argued | Decided | McLachlin | L'Heureux- Dubé | Gonthier | Iacobucci | Major | Bastarache | Binnie | Arbour | LeBel | Deschamps |
| R v Perciballi, [2002] 2 S.C.R. 761; 2002 SCC 51 | June 11, 2002 | June 11, 2002 | V | | | | | | | | | |
| RC v Quebec (AG); R v Beauchamps, [2002] 2 S.C.R. 762; 2002 SCC 52 | May 13, 2002 | June 20, 2002 | | | | | | | | | | |
| Lavigne v Canada (Office of the Commissioner of Official Languages), [2002] 2 S.C.R. 773; 2002 SCC 53 | January 17, 2002 | June 20, 2002 | | | | | | | | | | |
| Ross River Dena Council Band v Canada, [2002] 2 S.C.R. 816; 2002 SCC 54 | December 11, 2001 | June 20, 2002 | | | | | | | | | | |
| R v Burke, [2002] 2 S.C.R. 857; 2002 SCC 55 | March 12, 2002 | June 21, 2002 | | | | | | | | | | |
| R v Handy, [2002] 2 S.C.R. 908; 2002 SCC 56 | October 9, 2001 | June 21, 2002 | | | | | | | | | | |
| Babcock v Canada (AG), [2002] 3 S.C.R. 3; 2002 SCC 57 | February 20, 2002 | July 11, 2002 | | | | | | | | | | |
| R v Shearing, [2002] 3 S.C.R. 33; 2002 SCC 58 | October 9, 2001 | July 18, 2002 | | | | | | | | | | |
| Somersall v Friedman, [2002] 3 S.C.R. 109; 2002 SCC 59 | January 21, 2002 | August 8, 2002 | | | | | | | | | | |
| CIBC Mortgage Corp v Vasquez, [2002] 3 S.C.R. 168; 2002 SCC 60 | February 12, 2002 | September 12, 2002 | | | | | | | | | | |
| Case name | Argued | Decided | McLachlin | L'Heureux- Dubé | Gonthier | Iacobucci | Major | Bastarache | Binnie | Arbour | LeBel | Deschamps |
| Lavallee, Rackel & Heintz v Canada (AG); White, Ottenheimer & Baker v Canada (AG); R v Fink, [2002] 3 S.C.R. 209; 2002 SCC 61 | December 13, 2001 | September 12, 2002 | | | | | | | | | | |
| Schreiber v Canada (AG), [2002] 3 S.C.R. 269; 2002 SCC 62 | April 16, 2002 | September 12, 2002 | | | | | | | | | | |
| Canam Enterprises Inc v Coles, [2002] 3 S.C.R. 307; 2002 SCC 63 | October 8, 2002 | October 8, 2002 | V | | | | | | | | | |
| R v Hall, [2002] 3 S.C.R. 309; 2002 SCC 64 | April 23, 2002 | October 10, 2002 | | | | | | | | | | |
| Krieger v Law Society of Alberta, [2002] 3 S.C.R. 372; 2002 SCC 65 | May 17, 2002 | October 10, 2002 | | | | | | | | | | |
| B v Ontario (Human Rights Commission), [2002] 3 S.C.R. 403; 2002 SCC 66 | May 14, 2002 | October 31, 2002 | | | | | | | | | | |
| R v Noël, [2002] 3 S.C.R. 433; 2002 SCC 67 | May 14, 2002 | October 31, 2002 | | | | | | | | | | |
| Sauvé v Canada (Chief Electoral Officer), [2002] 3 S.C.R. 519; 2002 SCC 68 | December 10, 2001 | October 31, 2002 | | | | | | | | | | |
| R v Wilson, [2002] 3 S.C.R. 629; 2002 SCC 69 | October 31, 2002 | October 31, 2002 | | | | | V | | | | | |
| R v Neil, [2002] 3 S.C.R. 631; 2002 SCC 70 | January 25, 2002 | November 1, 2002 | | | | | | | | | | |
| Case name | Argued | Decided | McLachlin | L'Heureux- Dubé | Gonthier | Iacobucci | Major | Bastarache | Binnie | Arbour | LeBel | Deschamps |
| Macdonell v Quebec (Commission d'accès à l'information), [2002] 3 S.C.R. 661; 2002 SCC 71 | January 22, 2002 | November 1, 2002 | | | | | | | | | | |
| Quebec (AG) v Laroche, [2002] 3 S.C.R. 708; 2002 SCC 72 | January 16, 2002 | November 21, 2002 | | | | | | | | | | |
| R v Jarvis, [2002] 3 S.C.R. 757; 2002 SCC 73 | June 13, 2002 | November 21, 2002 | | | | | | | | | | |
| R v Ling, [2002] 3 S.C.R. 814; 2002 SCC 74 | June 13, 2002 | November 21, 2002 | | | | | | | | | | |
| Ruby v Canada (Solicitor General), [2002] 4 S.C.R. 3; 2002 SCC 75 | April 24, 2002 | November 21, 2002 | | | | | | | | | | |
| Harvard College v Canada (Commissioner of Patents), [2002] 4 S.C.R. 45; 2002 SCC 76 | May 21, 2002 | December 5, 2002 | | | | | | | | | | |
| Apotex Inc v Wellcome Foundation Ltd, [2002] 4 S.C.R. 153; 2002 SCC 77 | February 14, 2002 | December 5, 2002 | | | | | | | | | | |
| Spar Aerospace Ltd v American Mobile Satellite Corp, [2002] 4 S.C.R. 205; 2002 SCC 78 | June 11, 2002 | December 6, 2002 | | | | | | | | | | |
| Wewaykum Indian Band v Canada, [2002] 4 S.C.R. 245; 2002 SCC 79 | December 6, 2001 | December 6, 2002 | | | | | | | | | | |
| R v Harvey, [2002] 4 S.C.R. 311; 2002 SCC 80 | December 11, 2002 | December 11, 2002 | | | | V | | | | | | |
| Case name | Argued | Decided | McLachlin | L'Heureux- Dubé | Gonthier | Iacobucci | Major | Bastarache | Binnie | Arbour | LeBel | Deschamps |
| 373409 Alberta Ltd (Receiver of) v Bank of Montreal, [2002] 4 S.C.R. 312; 2002 SCC 81 | October 1, 2002 | December 12, 2002 | | | | | | | | | | |
| R v Squires, [2002] 4 S.C.R. 323; 2002 SCC 82 | December 12, 2002 | December 12, 2002 | | | | V | | | | | | |
| Nova Scotia (AG) v Walsh, [2002] 4 S.C.R. 325; 2002 SCC 83 | March 13, 2002 | December 19, 2002 | | | | | | | | | | |
| Gosselin v Québec (AG), [2002] 4 S.C.R. 429; 2002 SCC 84 | October 29, 2001 | December 19, 2002 | 1 | 1 | 1 | 1 | 1 | 2 / 2 / 2 | 1 | 3 | 4 / 3 / 3 | |
| Prud'homme v Prud'homme, [2002] 4 S.C.R. 663; 2002 SCC 85 | March 13, 2002 | December 20, 2002 | | | | | | | | | | |
| Chamberlain v Surrey School District No 36, [2002] 4 S.C.R. 710; 2002 SCC 86 | June 12, 2002 | December 20, 2002 | | | | | | | | | | |

== Justices of the Supreme Court ==
| Justice | Reasons written | Votes cast | % Majority |
|---|---|---|---|
| Chief Justice Beverley McLachlin | 11 / 1 / 1 / 1 / Total=14 | 53 / 0 / 1 / 2 / Total=56 | 65 of 70 (92.86%) |
| Puisne Justice Claire L'Heureux-Dubé (retired July 1, 2002) | 2 / 0 / 2 / 5 / Total=09 | 45 / 2 / 3 / 3 / Total=53 | 49 of 62 (79.03%) |
| Puisne Justice Charles Gonthier | 7 / 2 / 0 / 3 / Total=12 | 58 / 0 / 2 / 2 / Total=62 | 67 of 74 (90.54%) |
| Puisne Justice Frank Iacobucci | 22 / 0 / 0 / 1 / Total=23 | 54 / 0 / 0 / 2 / Total=56 | 76 of 79 (96.2%) |
| Puisne Justice John C. Major | 12 / 0 / 0 / 0 / Total=12 | 58 / 0 / 0 / 7 / Total=65 | 70 of 77 (90.91%) |
| Pusine Justice Michel Bastarache | 10 / 0 / 1 / 5 / Total=16 | 58 / 0 / 0 / 4 / Total=62 | 68 of 78 (87.18%) |
| Puisne Justice Ian Binnie | 11 / 0 / 0 / 4 / Total=15 | 63 / 0 / 0 / 3 / Total=66 | 74 of 81 (91.36%) |
| Pusine Justice Louise Arbour | 8 / 4 / 1 / 2 / Total=15 | 60 / 0 / 1 / 3 / Total=64 | 72 of 79 (91.14%) |
| Pusine Justice Louis LeBel | 13 / 3 / 1 / 3 / Total=20 | 58 / 1 / 0 / 4 / Total=63 | 75 of 83 (90.36%) |
| Pusine Justice Marie Deschamps (appointed August 7, 2002) | 0 / 0 / 0 / 0 / Total=00 | 3 / 0 / 0 / 0 / Total=03 | 3 of 3 (100%) |
This Notes on statistics: A justice is only included in the majority if they have joined or concurred in the Court's judgment in full. Percentages are based only on the cases in which a justice participated, and are rounded to the nearest tenth of a percent.

== Table key ==
Delivered the Court's reason
Joined the Court's reason
Filed a concurrence
Joined a concurrence
Filed a dissent
Joined a dissent
Filed a concurrence/dissent
Joined a concurrence/dissent
Did not participate in the judgment
Did not participate in the final disposition of the judgment
Not a member of the Court at the time of hearing or delivering
- Decisions that do not note a Justice delivering the Court's reason are per coram.
- Multiple concurrences and dissents within a case are numbered, with joining votes numbered accordingly. Justices occasionally join multiple reasons in a single case; each vote is subdivided accordingly.
- Multiple unnumbered reasons are jointly written or delivered.
- Decisions that are given orally from the bench are denoted by a "V"; per coram decisions delivered orally from the bench only note a "V" on the most senior justice on the panel.
- An asterisk ( * ) in the Court's opinion denotes that it was only a majority in part or a plurality.
