= Teno =

Teno may refer to:

== People ==
- Teno Roncalio (1916–2003), American politician and writer
- Aurelio Teno, Spanish sculptor of the 1976 Don Quixote Kennedy Center sculpture
- Harvey Teno (1915–1990), Canadian ice hockey player
- Jean-Marie Teno (born 1954), Cameroonian film director and filmmaker
- Melina Teno (born 1984), Brazilian water polo player

== Places ==
- Teno, Chile, a city and commune
- Teno (Mataquito), a river in Chile
- Tana (Finland–Norway) (Finnish: Teno), a river
- Macizo de Teno ('Teno massif'), a mountain range on Tenerife, Spain

== Other uses ==
- SS Mohamed Ali El-Kebir, formerly SS Teno, a steam turbine ocean liner
- Technische Nothilfe (TeNo, 'Technical Emergency Corps'), a German civil defence organisation 1919–1945

== See also ==
- Arnold v Teno, a 1978 Canadian court case
