= Armand DesRoches =

Joseph Armand DesRoches

Supreme Court of Prince Edward Island

Personal details
- Born: 1940 (age 84–85); Miscouche, Prince Edward Island
- Education: Bachelor of Arts (1963); Bachelor of Laws (1966)
- Alma mater: Dalhousie University

Joseph Armand DesRoches is a former Canadian judge of the Supreme Court of Prince Edward Island. In 2001, DesRoches became the first chief justice of Prince Edward Island with Acadian heritage.

== History ==
In 1967, DesRoches began his legal career with a firm in Summerside, Prince Edward Island named Campbell and Campbell. DesRoches relocated to Ottawa in 1969 where he joined the military legal system and became deputy judge advocate general within the Courts-martial of Canada.

DesRoches was appointed to the Supreme Court of Prince Edward Island in July 1991. In August 2001, DesRoches was appointed chief justice.

DesRoches retired in 2004. DesRoches has continued to do interviews and discuss legal issues in the media following his retirement.

== Notable trials ==
DesRoches delivered judgment in R. v Matheson in 1992, whose 1994 appeal has been cited in more than sixty subsequent cases. (Note: Although DesRoches did not judge the 1994 appeal, DesRoches' 1992 judgment was quoted multiple times in the 1994 appeal.) DesRoches also delivered sentence at the Trial of Roger Charles Bell, also known as the P.E.I. Bomber in 1997. DesRoches sentenced Bell to 10 years in prison.
