= Barry Davis =

Barry Davis may refer to:

- Barry Davis (footballer) (1943–2024), Australian rules footballer
- Barry Davis (wrestler) (born 1961), American amateur wrestler
- Barry Davis (baseball), American baseball coach
- Barry Davis (sportscaster) (born 1968), Canadian sportscaster
- Barry Davis (rugby league) (born 1949), Australian rugby league player
- Barry R. Davis, American biostatistician

== See also ==
- Barry Davies (disambiguation)
