= Arthur M. Lutz =

Canadian judge

Court of Queen's Bench of Alberta

Personal details
- Born: 1937; Nova Scotia
- Education: Bachelor of Commerce (1957); Bachelor of Laws (1960)
- Alma mater: Dalhousie University

Arthur M. Lutz is a former Canadian judge of the Court of Queen's Bench of Alberta.

== History ==
Arthur M. Lutz was born in the Canadian province of Nova Scotia in 1937. (Note: The Edmonton Journal reported that Lutz was age 24 in June 1961 and age 45 in November 1982.) Arthur M. Lutz was admitted to the Bar of Alberta in 1961. In 1966, Lutz joined a legal firm in Calgary, Alberta named Lutz, Westerberg, O'Leary, which was later renamed Lutz, Westerberg, O'Leary and Fenerty. Lutz served as president of the Liberal Association of Calgary-Glenmore in 1969 and of the Alberta Liberal Party in 1973.

In 1982, Lutz was appointed to the Court of Queen's Bench of Alberta.

== Notable trials ==
Arthur M. Lutz delivered judgment in Wirth v Acadia Pipe & Supply Corp in 1991 and Olson v. New Home Certification Program of Alberta in 1998, each of which have been cited in more than forty subsequent cases. Lutz also delivered judgment in R. v. Jarvis in 1998, which, in its 2002 appeal, has been cited more than five hundred times. (Note: Although Lutz did not judge the 2002 appeal, Lutz's 1998 judgment is quoted multiple times in the 2002 appeal.)
