= Sonnenberg Inc. v Stewart, Smith =

Alberta court decision

Max Sonnenberg Inc. v. Stewart, Smith (Canada) Ltd.
- Court: Alberta Court of Queen’s Bench
- Decided: 1986
- Citations: 1986 CanLII 1771 (AB QB), [1987] 2 W.W.R. 75, 48 Alta. L.R. (2d) 367

Court membership
- Judge sitting: Joanne B. Veit

Keywords
- Costs; solicitor–client costs; indemnity basis; litigation conduct; damages

Max Sonnenberg Inc. v. Stewart, Smith (Canada) Ltd., 1986 CanLII 1771 (AB QB), [1987] 2 W.W.R. 75, 48 Alta. L.R. (2d) 367, is a decision of the Alberta Court of Queen’s Bench written by Justice Joanne B. Veit.

== Background ==
The case Max Sonnenberg Inc. v. Stewart, Smith has received judicial notice and is often cited in Canadian law for its discussion of solicitor–client and indemnity costs, and for distinguishing between damages—which address the wrongful act that gave rise to the cause of action—and costs, which relate to the parties’ conduct during the litigation itself.

The dispute stemmed from a helicopter crash on May 12, 1981, at the Edmonton Municipal Airport. The aircraft, a Bell Jet Ranger leased from Max Sonnenberg, a Canadian aircraft lessor based in New Mexico, was operated by Shirley Air Services Ltd. Following the crash, the company’s president, Richard Rasmussen, reportedly tried to prevent journalists from photographing the scene. The incident received media attention across Canada as well as in the United States.

In the civil case that followed, Justice Joanne Veit of the Alberta Court of Queen’s Bench found that Rasmussen had committed fraud by submitting a false proof-of-loss statement for the damaged helicopter without the owner’s consent. Sonnenberg was represented by Alec T. Murray, QC, who would later become a justice of the same court.

The trial lasted eight weeks and involved ten lawyers as well as multiple aviation insurers. It ultimately produced a separate written ruling on costs, in which Justice Veit clarified the three traditional categories of cost awards and urged the adoption of consistent terminology for full-indemnity costs. Her reasoning was later endorsed by Judge L. Diane Young.

As of 2025, the Sonnenberg decision has been cited more than sixty times in Canadian court judgments and legal commentaries.

== See also ==
- Costs (English law)
- Insurance fraud
- Law of Canada
