= Dickason v University of Alberta =

Canadian labour and human rights case

Dickason v. University of Alberta
- Court: Alberta Court of Queen's Bench
- Decided: 1988
- Citations: 1988 CanLII 5259 (AB QB); [1988] A.J. No. 521

Case history
- Prior actions: Board of Inquiry decision in favour of Dickason, 1987
- Subsequent actions: Appeal to Alberta Court of Appeal, University of Alberta v. Alberta (Human Rights Commission), 1991 ABCA 208; Supreme Court of Canada, 1992

Court membership
- Judge sitting: Alec T. Murray

Case opinions
- Decision by: Justice A. T. Murray

Keywords
- Age discrimination, mandatory retirement, employment law, human rights

Dickason v. University of Alberta was a landmark Canadian labour and human rights case concerning age discrimination and mandatory retirement in higher education. The case centered on Dr. Olive Patricia Dickason (1920–2011), a Métis historian who became a full professor at the University of Alberta in 1985, the same year she was required to retire under the university’s collective agreement, which mandated retirement at age 65.

== Background ==
Dickason filed a complaint with the Alberta Human Rights Commission, arguing that the policy violated the province's Individual's Rights Protection Act by discriminating on the basis of age. In 1987, a Board of Inquiry ruled in her favour, ordering the University to reinstate her and compensate for lost wages.

The University of Alberta sought judicial review in the Alberta Court of Queen's Bench, where Justice Alec T. Murray initially granted an interim injunction protecting Dickason and two other professors, Dr. Namik Oguztoreli and Dr. Bhalachandra Paranjape, from forced retirement. In a 1988 ruling, Murray upheld the Board's finding that mandatory retirement constituted unlawful age discrimination.

The decision was overturned by the Alberta Court of Appeal in University of Alberta v. Alberta (Human Rights Commission), 1991 ABCA 208, which held that the policy was justified under the existing legal framework. Dickason then appealed to the Supreme Court of Canada, which in Dickason v. University of Alberta, [1992] 2 S.C.R. 1103, upheld the university's right to enforce mandatory retirement at age 65, concluding that such provisions were reasonable in the context of academic employment.

The case became a key precedent in Canadian labour law, causing national debates about age discrimination, academic tenure, and retirement policy within Canadian universities.

== See also ==
- Olive Dickason
- McKinney v University of Guelph
