= Arnold v Teno =

- Supreme Court of Canada

Hearing: June 16 and 17, 1977 Judgment: January 19, 1978
- Full case name: Wallace Arnold and Brian Arnold v. Diane Marie Teno, an Infant by her Next Friend Orville Teno, the Said Orville Teno and Yvonne Teno; J.B. Jackson Limited and Stuart Galloway v. Diane Marie Teno, an Infant by her Next Friend Orville Teno, the Said Orville Teno and Yvonne Teno and Teno in her Capacity as Defendant to a Claim for Indemnity; Yvonne Teno and Orville Teno (with Respect to the Claim of the Defendants for Contribution and Indemnity v. Wallace Arnold, Brian Arnold, J.B. Jackson Limited and Stuart Galloway and Diane Marie Teno, an Infant by her Next Friend Orville Teno and the Said Orville Teno
- Citations: [1978] 2 SCR 287
- Prior history: Mixed judgment by the Court of Appeal for Ontario.
- Ruling: Appeal allowed in part.

Holding
- Various rulings made regarding damages for personal injury.

Court membership
- Chief Justice: Bora Laskin; Puisne Justices: Ronald Martland, Wilfred Judson, Roland Ritchie, Wishart Spence, Louis-Philippe Pigeon, Brian Dickson, Jean Beetz, Louis-Philippe de Grandpré

Reasons given
- Majority: Spence J, joined by Laskin CJ and Judson and Dickson JJ
- Concurrence: Pigeon J, joined by Martland, Ritchie, and Beetz JJ
- Concur/dissent: de Grandpré J

Arnold v Teno, [1978] 2 SCR 287 is a leading tort case from the Supreme Court of Canada. This decision was part of a trilogy of personal injury cases including Andrews v Grand & Toy Alberta Ltd (1978) and Thornton v Prince George School Board (1978).

== Teno v Arnold (1974) ==
On July 1, 1969, four-year-old Diane Mugala Teno and her six-year-old brother were crossing the street to get some ice cream from the ice cream truck parked on the other side when she was struck by a car driven by Brian Arnold. Teno was rendered severely brain damaged and in 1974, sued Arnold for damages. At trial Teno was successful and was awarded damages.

== Arnold v Teno (1978) ==
In 1978, Arnold appealed the amount awarded. The issue before the Court was whether the amount of award for damages was correct. The Court dismissed the appeal and upheld the original damage award. Justice Spence, writing for the majority, observed that the purpose of the award in these circumstances is to ensure that Teno is properly cared for the rest of her life. The sum of $7,500 per year was an "equitable" amount proposed by the Court.

Spence further qualified his decision by acknowledging the fear of overly generous awards for tortious acts stating that "the very real and serious social burden of these exorbitant awards has been illustrated graphically in the United States in cases concerning medical malpractice."

== Impact ==
Both the initial 1974 lawsuit and the 1978 appeal are frequently cited in Canadian case law. In Kuipers v Gordon Riley Transport for example, Samuel Sereth Lieberman stated "In Teno v. Arnold, supra, the Ontario Court of Appeal disagreed with Chief Justice McGillivray's view that the figures to be used in assessing damages for pain suffering and loss of amenities were arbitrary or conventional. That Court, however, accepted the principle that awards for similar injuries should be comparable."

== See also ==
- List of Supreme Court of Canada cases (Laskin Court)
