= 1994 reasons of the Supreme Court of Canada =

The list below consists of the reasons delivered from the bench by the Supreme Court of Canada during 1994. This list, however, does not include decisions on motions.

== Reasons ==
Delivered the Court's reason
Joined the Court's reason
Filed a concurrence
Joined a concurrence
Filed a dissent
Joined a dissent
Filed a concurrence/dissent
Joined a concurrence/dissent
Did not participate in the judgment
Did not participate in the final disposition of the judgment
Not a member of the Court at the time of hearing or delivering
- Decisions that do not note a Justice delivering the Court's reason are per coram.
- Multiple concurrences and dissents within a case are numbered, with joining votes numbered accordingly. Justices occasionally join multiple reasons in a single case; each vote is subdivided accordingly.
- Multiple unnumbered reasons are jointly written or delivered.
- Decisions that are given orally from the bench are denoted by a "V"; per coram decisions delivered orally from the bench only note a "V" on the most senior justice on the panel.
- An asterisk ( * ) in the Court's opinion denotes that it was only a majority in part or a plurality.

Case name	Argued	Decided	Lamer	La Forest	L'Heureux-Dubé	Sopinka	Gonthier	Cory	McLachlin	Iacobucci	Major
R v Pétel, [1994] 1 SCR 3	November 3, 1993	January 20, 1994									
R v Colarusso, [1994] 1 SCR 20	March 30, 1993	January 26, 1994									
Kenora (Town of) Hydro Electric Commission v Vacationland Dairy Co-operative Ltd, [1994] 1 SCR 80	October 6, 1993	January 27, 1994									
Toneguzzo-Norvell (Guardian ad litem of) v Burnaby Hospital, [1994] 1 SCR 114	November 1, 1993	January 27, 1994									
R v Arcangioli, [1994] 1 SCR 129	November 12, 1993	January 27, 1994									
R v Pittman, [1994] 1 SCR 148	January 28, 1994	January 28, 1994									
International Longshoremen's and Warehousemen's Union—Canada Area Local 500 v Canada, [1994] 1 SCR 150	January 31, 1994	January 31, 1994									
R v Dickson, [1994] 1 SCR 153	February 2, 1994	February 2, 1994									
R v Richardson, [1994] 1 SCR 155	February 2, 1994	February 2, 1994									
Gibney v Gilliland, [1994] 1 SCR 157	February 22, 1994	February 22, 1994									
Quebec (AG) v Canada (National Energy Board), [1994] 1 SCR 159	October 13, 1993	February 24, 1994									
Mobil Oil Canada Ltd v Canada-Newfoundland Offshore Petroleum Board, [1994] 1 SCR 202	November 30, 1993	February 24, 1994									
Shell Canada Products Ltd v Vancouver (City of), [1994] 1 SCR 231	April 27, 1993	February 24, 1994									
United States of America v Lépine, [1994] 1 SCR 286	June 18, 1993	February 24, 1994									
RJR-MacDonald Inc v Canada (AG), [1994] 1 SCR 311	October 4, 1993	March 3, 1994									
Case name	Argued	Decided	Lamer	La Forest	L'Heureux-Dubé	Sopinka	Gonthier	Cory	McLachlin	Iacobucci	Major
R v Nagra, [1994] 1 SCR 355	March 15, 1994	March 15, 1994									
R v Bois, [1994] 1 SCR 357	March 16, 1994	March 16, 1994									
Cunningham v Wheeler; Cooper v Miller; Shanks v McNee, [1994] 1 SCR 359	November 4, 1993	March 17, 1994									
Brown v British Columbia (Minister of Transportation and Highways), [1994] 1 SCR 420	November 8, 1993	March 17, 1994									
Swinamer v Nova Scotia (AG), [1994] 1 SCR 445	November 8, 1993	March 17, 1994									
R v Durette, [1994] 1 SCR 469	November 10, 1993	March 17, 1994									
Bank of Nova Scotia v Dunphy Leasing Enterprises Ltd, [1994] 1 SCR 552	March 18, 1994	March 18, 1994									
G (L) v B (G), [1995] 3 SCR 367	March 7, 1994	March 23, 1994									
R v Finta, [1994] 1 SCR 701	June 2, 3, 1993	March 24, 1994									
R v P (MB), [1994] 1 SCR 555	November 12, 1993	April 14, 1994									
R v Power, [1994] 1 SCR 601	December 3, 1993	April 14, 1994									
R v Burns, [1994] 1 SCR 656	January 26, 1994	April 14, 1994									
Galaske v O'Donnell, [1994] 1 SCR 670	December 3, 1993	April 14, 1994									
Téléphone Guèvremont Inc v Quebec (Régie des télécommunications), [1994] 1 SCR 878	April 26, 1994	April 26, 1994									
R v R (D), [1994] 1 SCR 881	April 27, 1994	April 27, 1994									
Case name	Argued	Decided	Lamer	La Forest	L'Heureux-Dubé	Sopinka	Gonthier	Cory	McLachlin	Iacobucci	Major
Masters v Masters, [1994] 1 SCR 883	April 28, 1994	April 28, 1994									
R v M (ML), [1994] 2 SCR 3	May 3, 1994	May 3, 1994									
R v Zazulak, [1994] 2 SCR 5	May 4, 1994	May 4, 1994									
Boutin v Distributions CLB Inc, [1994] 2 SCR 7	May 4, 1994	May 4, 1994									
R v Mohan, [1994] 2 SCR 9	November 9, 1993	May 5, 1994									
British Columbia (AG) v Canada (AG); An Act respecting the Vancouver Island Railway (Re), [1994] 2 SCR 41	December 2, 1993	May 5, 1994									
Zeitel v Ellscheid, [1994] 2 SCR 142	January 31, 1994	May 5, 1994									
Catholic Children's Aid Society of Metropolitan Toronto v M (C), [1994] 2 SCR 165	December 7, 1993	May 5, 1994									
Willmor Discount Corp v Vaudreuil (City of), [1994] 2 SCR 210	February 1, 1994	May 5, 1994									
R v Jones, [1994] 2 SCR 229	October 12, 1993	May 12, 1994									
R v Howard, [1994] 2 SCR 299	February 22, 1994	May 12, 1994									
R v Jack, [1994] 2 SCR 310	May 24, 1994	May 24, 1994									
Canada v Antosko, [1994] 2 SCR 312	February 2, 1994	May 26, 1994									
143471 Canada Inc v Quebec (AG); Tabah v Quebec (AG), [1994] 2 SCR 339	October 5, 1993	May 26, 1994									
R v H (DS) and N (JD), [1994] 2 SCR 392	May 30, 1994	May 30, 1994									
Case name	Argued	Decided	Lamer	La Forest	L'Heureux-Dubé	Sopinka	Gonthier	Cory	McLachlin	Iacobucci	Major
Reza v Canada, [1994] 2 SCR 394	April 25, 1994	June 9, 1994									
Schmidt v Air Products Canada Ltd, [1994] 2 SCR 611	December 1, 1993	June 9, 1994									
R v Stellato, [1994] 2 SCR 478	June 13, 1994	June 13, 1994									
R v McIntyre, [1994] 2 SCR 480	June 14, 1994	June 14, 1994									
R v Giesbrecht, [1994] 2 SCR 482	June 14, 1994	June 14, 1994									
R v Godin, [1994] 2 SCR 484	June 16, 1994	June 16, 1994									
R v Richer, [1994] 2 SCR 486	June 17, 1994	June 17, 1994									
R v Boersma, [1994] 2 SCR 488	June 17, 1994	June 17, 1994									
Comité paritaire de l'industrie de la chemise v Potash; Comité paritaire de l'industrie de la chemise v Sélection Milton, [1994] 2 SCR 406	January 27, 1994	June 23, 1994									
R v Rowbotham; R v Roblin, [1994] 2 SCR 463	December 8, 1993	June 23, 1994									
Saskatchewan River Bungalows Ltd v Maritime Life Assurance Co, [1994] 2 SCR 490	March 14, 1994	June 23, 1994									
R v Oommen, [1994] 2 SCR 507	April 25, 1994	June 23, 1994									
Commission scolaire régionale de Chambly v Bergevin, [1994] 2 SCR 525	February 1, 1994	June 23, 1994									
Pezim v British Columbia (Superintendent of Brokers), [1994] 2 SCR 557	February 24, 1994	June 23, 1994									
Reference Re Quebec Sales Tax, [1994] 2 SCR 715	December 9, 1993	June 23, 1994									
Case name	Argued	Decided	Lamer	La Forest	L'Heureux-Dubé	Sopinka	Gonthier	Cory	McLachlin	Iacobucci	Major
R v Clemente, [1994] 2 SCR 758	June 13, 1994	July 14, 1994									
Marzetti v Marzetti, [1994] 2 SCR 765	February 3, 1994	July 14, 1994									
Tataryn v Tataryn Estate, [1994] 2 SCR 807	May 3, 1994	July 14, 1994									
R v François, [1994] 2 SCR 827	May 5, 1994	July 14, 1994									
R v Chartrand, [1994] 2 SCR 864	March 15, 1994	July 14, 1994									
R v Moyer, [1994] 2 SCR 899	June 1, 1994	September 1, 1994									
R v Whittle, [1994] 2 SCR 914	February 25, 1994	September 1, 1994									
R v Tran, [1994] 2 SCR 951	February 25, 1994	September 1, 1994									
R v C (TL), [1994] 2 SCR 1012	June 3, 1994	September 15, 1994									
R v Bartle, [1994] 3 SCR 173	March 2, 3, 1994	September 29, 1994									
R v Prosper, [1994] 3 SCR 236	March 2, 3, 1994	September 29, 1994									
R v Pozniak, [1994] 3 SCR 310	March 2, 3, 1994	September 29, 1994									
R v Matheson, [1994] 3 SCR 328	March 2, 3, 1994	September 29, 1994									
R v Harper, [1994] 3 SCR 343	March 2, 3, 1994	September 29, 1994									
R v Cobham, [1994] 3 SCR 360	May 27, 1994	September 29, 1994									
Case name	Argued	Decided	Lamer	La Forest	L'Heureux-Dubé	Sopinka	Gonthier	Cory	McLachlin	Iacobucci	Major
Québec (Communauté urbaine) v Corp Notre-Dame de Bon-Secours, [1994] 3 SCR 3	May 25, 1994	September 30, 1994									
Buanderie centrale de Montréal Inc v Montreal (City of); Conseil de la santé et des services sociaux de la région de Montréal métropolitain v Montreal (City of), [1994] 3 SCR 29	May 25, 1994	September 30, 1994									
Partagec Inc v Québec (Communauté urbaine), [1994] 3 SCR 57	May 25, 1994	September 30, 1994									
R v Daviault, [1994] 3 SCR 63	February 4, 1994	September 30, 1994									
R v Kent, [1994] 3 SCR 133	May 30, 1994	September 30, 1994									
R v Borden, [1994] 3 SCR 145	June 16, 1994	September 30, 1994									
Hodgkinson v Simms, [1994] 3 SCR 377	December 6, 1993	September 30, 1994									
R v Swietlinski, [1994] 3 SCR 481	May 27, 1994	September 30, 1994									
Gaudet v Marchand, [1994] 3 SCR 514	October 5, 1994	October 5, 1994									
R v Haughton, [1994] 3 SCR 516	October 5, 1994	October 5, 1994									
R v Levasseur, [1994] 3 SCR 518	October 7, 1994	October 7, 1994									
R v K (A), [1994] 3 SCR 520	October 14, 1994	October 14, 1994									
R v S (WD), [1994] 3 SCR 521	May 5, 1994	October 20, 1994									
Webster v British Columbia Hydro and Power Authority, [1994] 3 SCR 549	October 12, 1994	October 20, 1994									
Thomson v Thomson, [1994] 3 SCR 551	January 26, 1994	October 20, 1994									
Case name	Argued	Decided	Lamer	La Forest	L'Heureux-Dubé	Sopinka	Gonthier	Cory	McLachlin	Iacobucci	Major
Native Women's Assn of Canada v Canada, [1994] 3 SCR 627	March 4, 1994	October 27, 1994									
Willick v Willick, [1994] 3 SCR 670	March 16, 1994	October 27, 1994									
R v Brown, [1994] 3 SCR 749	November 2, 1994	November 2, 1994									
TransGas Ltd v Mid-Plains Contractors Ltd, [1994] 3 SCR 753	November 3, 1994	November 3, 1994									
R v Ferris, [1994] 3 SCR 756	November 7, 1994	November 7, 1994									
R v H (LM), [1994] 3 SCR 758	November 8, 1994	November 8, 1994									
R v Dubasz, [1994] 3 SCR 759	November 10, 1994	November 10, 1994									
R v Heywood, [1994] 3 SCR 761	April 27, 1994	November 24, 1994									
R v Huot, [1994] 3 SCR 827	November 8, 1994	November 24, 1994									
R v Whitley, [1994] 3 SCR 830	December 1, 1994	December 1, 1994									
R v Feldman, [1994] 3 SCR 832	December 2, 1994	December 2, 1994									
Caisse populaire de Charlesbourg v Beauport (City of), [1994] 3 SCR 833	December 7, 1994	December 7, 1994									
Dagenais v Canadian Broadcasting Corp, [1994] 3 SCR 835	January 24, 1994	December 8, 1994									
R v S (T), [1994] 3 SCR 952	January 24, 25, 1994	December 8, 1994									
R v Laba, [1994] 3 SCR 965	June 15, 1994	December 8, 1994									
Case name	Argued	Decided	Lamer	La Forest	L'Heureux-Dubé	Sopinka	Gonthier	Cory	McLachlin	Iacobucci	Major
R v Pizzardi; R v Levis, [1994] 3 SCR 1018	December 9, 1994	December 9, 1994									
R v Dikah, [1994] 3 SCR 1020	December 9, 1994	December 9, 1994									
Tolofson v Jensen; Lucas (Litigation Guardian of) v Gagnon, [1994] 3 SCR 1022	February 21, 1994	December 15, 1994									
Patterson v Gallant, [1994] 3 SCR 1080	October 31, 1994	December 15, 1994									
R v Bisson, [1994] 3 SCR 1097	November 28, 1994	December 15, 1994									
Apotex Inc v Canada (AG), [1994] 3 SCR 1100	December 5, 1994	December 15, 1994									
