= R v Mohan =

- Supreme Court of Canada

Hearing: November 9, 1993 Judgment: May 5, 1994
- Full case name: Her Majesty The Queen v Chikmaglur Mohan
- Citations: [1994] 2 SCR 9
- Ruling: appeal was allowed and the evidence was excluded.

Court membership
- Chief Justice: Antonio Lamer; Puisne Justices: Gérard La Forest, Claire L'Heureux-Dubé, John Sopinka, Charles Gonthier, Peter Cory, Beverley McLachlin, Frank Iacobucci, John C. Major

Reasons given
- Unanimous reasons by: Sopinka J.

R v Mohan, 1994 CanLII 80, [1994] 2 SCR 9 is a leading Supreme Court of Canada decision on the use of expert witnesses in trial testimony.

== Background ==
Chikmaglur Mohan was a pediatrician in North Bay, Ontario. He was charged with sexual assault of four teenage patients. During his trial, the defence tried to put Dr. Hill, a psychiatrist, on the stand as an expert on sexual assault. Hill intended to testify that the perpetrator of the offence must have possessed several abnormal characteristics, which Mohan did not have. In a voir dire hearing, Hill testified that the culprit in the first three assaults was likely a pedophile, while the fourth assault would have been by a sexual psychopath. This evidence was held to be inadmissible by the judge. Mohan was eventually convicted at trial but his conviction was overturned on appeal.

The issue before the Supreme Court was whether Hill's testimony could be admitted as that of an expert witness, and whether the testimony would violate the rule against character evidence.

== Opinion of the Court ==
Justice Sopinka, for a unanimous Court, allowed the appeal and held that the evidence should be excluded.

Expert evidence, stated Sopinka in the ruling, should be admitted based on four criteria:

- It must be relevant,
- it must be needed to assist the trier of fact,
- it should not trigger any exclusionary rules, and
- it must be given by a properly qualified expert.

Relevance is a question of law and so is determined by the judge. Where it approaches the "ultimate issue" of the trial, the standard for inclusion must be stricter. To be considered necessary, the expert evidence must be outside the likely everyday experience of a judge and jury. In that regard, Sopinka stated:

Expert evidence, to be necessary, must likely be outside the experience and knowledge of a judge or jury and must be assessed in light of its potential to distort the fact‑finding process. Necessity should not be judged by too strict a standard. The possibility that evidence will overwhelm the jury and distract them from their task can often be offset by proper instructions. Experts, however, must not be permitted to usurp the functions of the trier of fact causing a trial to degenerate to a contest of experts.

In total, the expert evidence should be included where the probative value of the evidence outweighs any prejudicial effect it may cause.

In the current case, Sopinka found that there was insufficient evidence to suggest that there was any clear standard for determining the profile of a pedophile or psychopath. Thus, the expert evidence was not considered reliable. Furthermore, the expert's evidence was not sufficiently relevant to be of any help.

== Impact ==
The criteria set out in Mohan did not include a stand-alone requirement for experts to have independence and impartiality, but many of the lower courts have attempted to infer such a requirement. In 2013, the Nova Scotia Court of Appeal held that that is not required. In affirming that ruling in 2015, the Supreme Court of Canada disagreed with the Nova Scotia Court of Appeal and held that the expert's duty to the court creates a threshold requirement for the admissibility of the expert's evidence, in which the determining factor is "whether the expert’s opinion would not change regardless of which party retained him or her".
