= Azuaje =

Azuaje is a surname. Notable people with the surname include:

- Cástor Oswaldo Azuaje Pérez (1951–2021), Venezuelan Catholic bishop
- Wilmer Azuaje (born 1977), Venezuelan politician
