= R v Burlingham =

- Supreme Court of Canada

Hearing: November 9, 1994 Judgment: May 18, 1995
- Full case name: Terrence Wayne Burlingham v. Her Majesty The Queen
- Citations: [1995] 2 S.C.R. 206
- Docket No.: 23966
- Prior history: Judgment for the Crown in the British Columbia Court of Appeal.
- Ruling: Appeal allowed

Holding
- Section 10(b) of the Canadian Charter of Rights and Freedoms requires: 1. The police hold off questioning a detainee until they have exercised their rights to counsel.; 2. The police to not belittle a detainee's lawyer.; 3. The police given a detainee an opportunity to speak to a lawyer when offering a plea deal.

Court membership
- Chief Justice: Antonio Lamer; Puisne Justices: Gérard La Forest, Claire L'Heureux-Dubé, John Sopinka, Charles Gonthier, Peter Cory, Beverley McLachlin, Frank Iacobucci, John C. Major

Reasons given
- Majority: Iacobucci J., joined by La Forest, Sopinka, Cory and Major JJ.
- Concurrence: Sopinka J., joined by Cory, Iacobucci and Major JJ.
- Concurrence: Gonthier J.
- Concur/dissent: L'Heureux‑Dubé J.
- Lamer C.J. and McLachlin J. took no part in the consideration or decision of the case.

R v Burlingham, [1995] 2 S.C.R. 206 is a leading decision on the Supreme Court of Canada on the right to counsel under section 10(b) of the Canadian Charter of Rights and Freedoms and the exclusion of evidence under section 24(2).

== Background ==
Terrence Burlingham was arrested for the October 1984 murders of Denean Worms and Brenda Hughes in Cranbrook, British Columbia. Over a period of four days, he was interrogated by police despite his continued request to see a lawyer. During the interrogation, the police suggested that his parents would be hurt by delaying things and made disparaging remarks about the accused's lawyer. The police later offered to reduce the charge to second degree murder if Burlingham were willing to disclose the location of the murder weapon. Eventually, he agreed and took them to the location where he had hidden the gun that was used to kill Hughes. The crown, however, had not consented to the deal and did not follow through with the bargain. The trial judge found that the deal was an honest mistake. However, since Burlingham did not have access to a lawyer, his rights under section 10(b) were violated. Despite the violation, the murder weapon and several incriminating statements were still admitted. Burlingham was convicted of first degree murder.

The British Columbia Court of Appeal upheld the decision with McEachern C.J. in dissent.

== Opinion of the Court ==
In a six to one decision, the Court found that the evidence should be excluded under section 24(2) of the Charter and overturned the conviction.

On the matter of the use of section 24(2) Iacobucci emphasized:

we should never lose sight of the fact that even a person accused of the most heinous crimes, and no matter the likelihood that he or she actually committed those crimes, is entitled to the full protection of the Charter. Short-cutting or short-circuiting those rights affects not only the accused, but also the entire reputation of the criminal justice system. It must be emphasized that the goals of preserving the integrity of the criminal justice system as well as promoting the decency of investigatory techniques are of fundamental importance in applying s. 24(2)... These goals operate independently of the type of crime for which the individual stands accused.

== See also ==
- List of Supreme Court of Canada cases
