= Benchijigua =

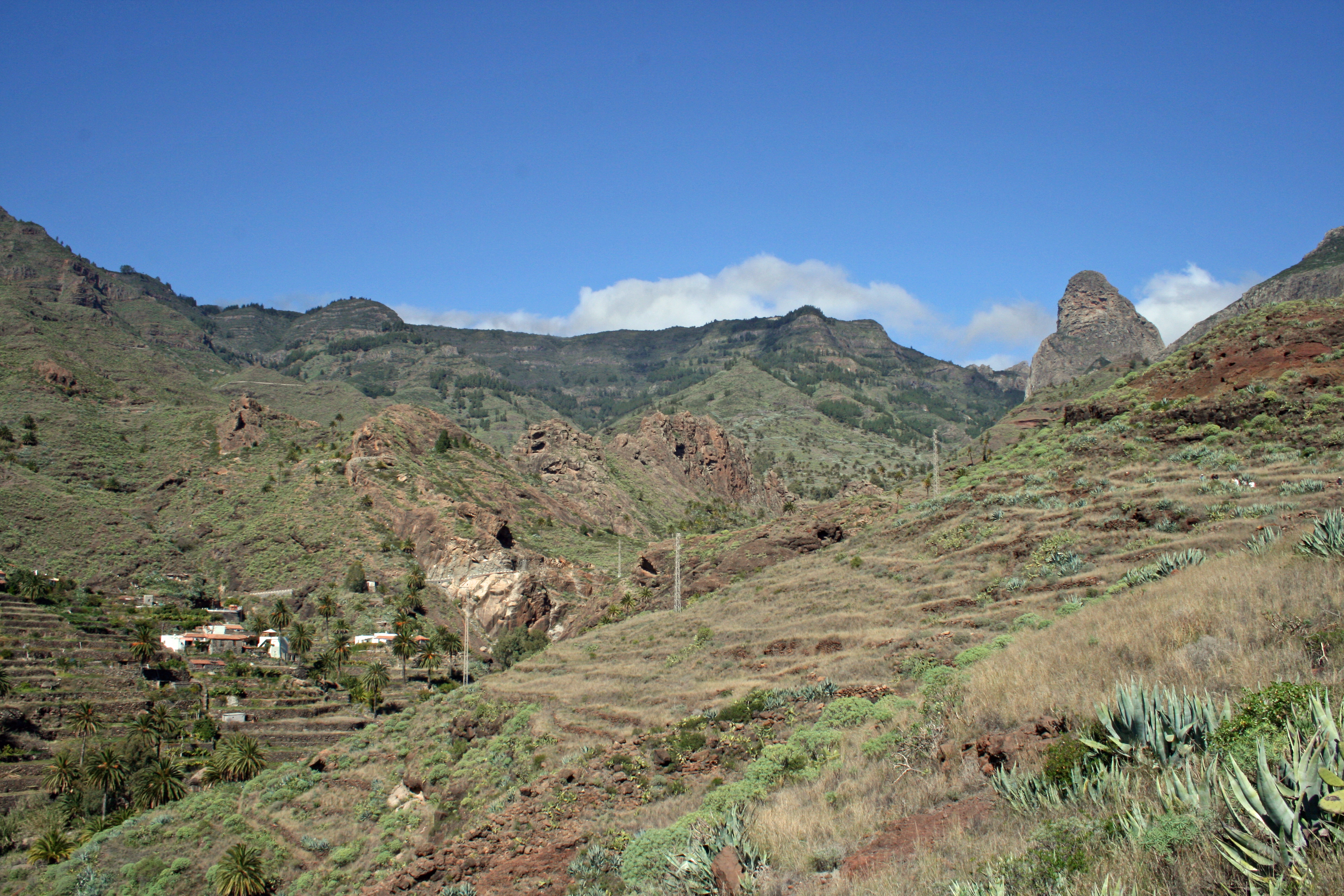
- Above the Barranco de Benchijigua
- Interactive map of Benchijigua
- Coordinates: 28°05′36″N 17°13′04″W
- Country: Spain
- Autonomous community: Canary Islands
- Province: Santa Cruz de Tenerife
- Island: La Gomera
- Municipality: San Sebastián de La Gomera
- Elevation: 600 m (2,000 ft)
- Postal code: E-38811

Benchijigua is a small village on the island of La Gomera in the Canary Islands. It lies at the head of a ravine (the Barranco de Benchijigua) at an altitude of 600m below the Roque de Agando, some 12 km north of Playa Santiago.

Benchijigua is one of the oldest settlements on the island. It was the home of emigrants to Louisiana during Spanish rule. The emigrants settled in the community of Bencheque in St. Bernard Parish.

The ferry company Fred. Olsen restored some houses here in traditional style and named one of their fast ferries Benchijigua Express.
