= R v Hibbert =

- Supreme Court of Canada

Hearing: January 30, 1995 Judgment: July 20, 1995
- Full case name: Lawrence Hibbert v Her Majesty The Queen
- Citations: [1995] 2 SCR 973, 99 CCC (3d) 193
- Docket No.: 23815
- Prior history: Judgment for the Crown in the Court of Appeal for Ontario
- Ruling: Appeal allowed and new trial ordered

Holding
- Duress does not negate the mens rea for aiding the commission of an offence under s. 21(1)(b) of the Criminal Code, but can still function as an excuse-based defence.

Court membership
- Chief Justice: Antonio Lamer; Puisne Justices: Gérard La Forest, Claire L'Heureux-Dubé, John Sopinka, Charles Gonthier, Peter Cory, Beverley McLachlin, Frank Iacobucci, John C. Major

Reasons given
- Unanimous reasons by: Lamer C.J.

R v Hibbert, [1995] 2 SCR 973, is a Supreme Court of Canada decision on aiding and abetting and the defence of duress in criminal law. The court held that duress is capable of negating the mens rea for some offences, but not for aiding the commission of an offence under s. 21(1)(b) of the Criminal Code. Nonetheless, duress can still function as an excuse-based defence.

== Background ==
On November 25, 1991, Fitzroy Cohen was shot four times with a semi-automatic handgun in the lobby of the apartment building he lived in. The shots were fired by Mark Bailey, an acquaintance of Cohen's. Cohen had been aware that Bailey was seeking revenge for an incident in the previous year in which Bailey had been robbed by a rival drug dealer while Cohen and others stood by watching and laughing.

Bailey was led to Cohen's apartment by the accused, Lawrence Hibbert, who was a close friend of Cohen. On the night of the shooting, Hibbert accidentally ran into Bailey, and was threatened with a handgun to bring Bailey to Cohen's apartment. Hibbert was also ordered to call Cohen to meet him in the lobby of the apartment.

Hibbert made no effort to intervene, and claimed that he had no opportunity to run away or warn Cohen. He was later driven from the scene by Bailey. Cohen survived the shooting, but Bailey was never caught. Hibbert turned himself in the next day and was charged with attempted murder as party to the offence.

At trial, Hibbert was acquitted of attempted murder but convicted of aggravated assault. The Court of Appeal upheld the conviction.

The Supreme Court of Canada was asked to decide the applicability of the defence of duress in the context of aiding and abetting the commission of an offence under s. 21(1)(b) of the Criminal Code.

== Decision of the Court ==
Chief Justice Lamer, writing for the unanimous court, held that the trial judge's instructions to the jury were incorrect and ordered a new trial. In particular, the trial judge was incorrect in referring to the mental state as being a "common intention" to carry out an unlawful purpose. Second, the instruction that the mens rea for party liability under s. 21(1)(b) could be negated by duress was also incorrect. Finally, the trial judge failed to instruct the jurors that the common law defence of duress could excuse the accused even if the Crown successfully proved the elements of the offence.

In arriving at the decision, the court considered the relationship between duress and the mens rea for party liability under ss. 21(1)(b) and 21(2) of the Code.

=== Mens rea of party liability ===
The court interpreted the word "purpose" in s. 21(1)(b) as meaning "intent" and rejected the arguments that the accused must "desire" the outcome in order to be guilty of aiding and abetting the commission of a crime. The court noted that using the concept of "desire" would lead to absurd results and would not accord with Parliamentary intention.

Under s. 21(2), the words "intention in common" was interpreted to mean that the party and the principal offender must have the same unlawful purpose in mind, but does not mean that they must have the same motives and desires.

=== Duress ===
The court found that a person acting under threats of death or bodily harm can in some cases negate the mens rea component of an offence. Whether or not it does so will depend on the particular offence in question. The relevant question in each case will be whether the definition of the offence as written by Parliament is capable of supporting the inference that the presence of coercion can have a bearing on the existence of mens rea.

In any case, the defence of duress (both the common law defence and the more narrow statutory defence set out in s. 17 of the Criminal Code) will be available as an excuse if the accused acted under threat. This acts similarly to the defence of necessity.

However, an accused cannot rely on the common law defence of duress if there was an opportunity to escape from the circumstances causing duress.
