= Samuel Sereth Lieberman =

Canadian judge

Supreme Court of Alberta

Personal details
- Born: April 14, 1922; Edmonton, Alberta, Canada
- Died: September 19, 2012 (aged 90)
- Education: Bachelor of Arts (1947); Bachelor of Laws (1948)
- Alma mater: University of Alberta

Samuel Sereth Lieberman was a Canadian judge. Lieberman was the first Jewish judge in the province of Alberta. He was inducted into the Alberta Order of Excellence in 2006.

== History ==
Samuel Sereth Lieberman was born in 1922 in Edmonton, Alberta. He flew as a coastal command pilot for the Royal Canadian Air Force during World War II.

Samuel Sereth Lieberman graduated from the University of Alberta Faculty of Law in 1948. In 1961, Lieberman was named to the Queen's Counsel. Lieberman was first appointed as a judge in 1970 and in 1976, Lieberman became a judge in the Alberta Court of Appeal. Lieberman served as a Deputy Judge of the Supreme Court of Northwest Territories in 1983.

Lieberman died on September 19, 2012.

== Notable trials ==
Samuel Sereth Lieberman judged Tiesmaki v. Wilson in 1974 and Kuipers v Gordon Riley Transport in 1976, both of which have been judicially noticed in many subsequent Canadian cases.
