= Barry M. Davies =

Canadian judge

Supreme Court of British Columbia

Personal details
- Born: 1947
- Education: Bachelor of Arts (1976); Bachelor of Laws (1978)
- Alma mater: University of British Columbia

Barry M. Davies is a former judge in the Supreme Court of British Columbia.

== History ==
Barry M. Davies studied law at the University of British Columbia in the 1970s. In 1979, Davies joined the Bar of British Columbia. In the 1980s, Davies became President of the Kelowna chapter of the Law Society of British Columbia. In late 1995, Davies became a judge with the Supreme Court of British Columbia.

== Notable trials ==
Barry M. Davies delivered judgment in Oliverius v British Columbia in 1999. The case pertained to a collision on the Rogers Pass involving two logging trucks that took place on 12 February 1994 whereby Lance Oliverius subsequently attempted to sue the Province of British Columbia. The Calgary Herald reported that the resulting highway closures prevented a major performance of The Wizard of Oz from taking place at the Southern Alberta Jubilee Auditorium because the cast and crew were unable to travel from Vancouver to Calgary.
