= 1991 reasons of the Supreme Court of Canada =

The list below consists of the reasons delivered from the bench by the Supreme Court of Canada during 1991. This list, however, does not include decisions on motions.

== Reasons ==
Delivered the Court's reason
Joined the Court's reason
Filed a concurrence
Joined a concurrence
Filed a dissent
Joined a dissent
Filed a concurrence/dissent
Joined a concurrence/dissent
Did not participate in the judgment
Did not participate in the final disposition of the judgment
Not a member of the Court at the time of hearing or delivering
- Decisions that do not note a Justice delivering the Court's reason are per coram.
- Multiple concurrences and dissents within a case are numbered, with joining votes numbered accordingly. Justices occasionally join multiple reasons in a single case; each vote is subdivided accordingly.
- Multiple unnumbered reasons are jointly written or delivered.
- Decisions that are given orally from the bench are denoted by a "V"; per coram decisions delivered orally from the bench only note a "V" on the most senior justice on the panel.
- An asterisk ( * ) in the Court's opinion denotes that it was only a majority in part or a plurality.

Case name	Argued	Decided	Lamer	La Forest	L'Heureux-Dubé	Sopinka	Gonthier	Cory	McLachlin	Stevenson	Iacobucci	Major
Sunrise Co. v. Lake Winnipeg (The), [1991] 1 SCR 3	May 23, 1990	January 17, 1991										
Caron v. Canada (Employment and Immigration Commission), [1991] 1 SCR 48	December 10, 1990	January 17, 1991										
Wale v. British Columbia (Attorney General), [1991] 1 SCR 62	December 10, 1990	January 21, 1991										
R. v. Nipawin and District Satellite T.V. Inc., [1991] 1 SCR 64	January 22, 1991	January 22, 1991										
R. v. B.(J.N.), [1991] 1 SCR 66	January 23, 1991	January 23, 1991										
R. v. Ratti, [1991] 1 SCR 68	May 30, 1990	January 25, 1991										
R. v. Romeo, [1991] 1 SCR 86	May 30, 1990	January 25, 1991										
R. v. Landry, [1991] 1 SCR 99	May 29, 1990	January 25, 1991										
Committee for the Commonwealth of Canada v. Canada, [1991] 1 SCR 139	May 22, 1990	January 25, 1991										
R. v. R. (R.L.), [1991] 1 SCR 115	January 29, 1991	January 29, 1991										
Case name	Argued	Decided	Lamer	La Forest	L'Heureux-Dubé	Sopinka	Gonthier	Cory	McLachlin	Stevenson	Iacobucci	Major
R. v. Henley, [1991] 1 SCR 116	January 29, 1991	January 29, 1991										
National Bank of Canada v. Corbeil, [1991] 1 SCR 117	October 4, 1990	February 7, 1991										
Ford v. Dominion of Canada General Insurance Co., [1991] 1 SCR 136	January 23, 1991	February 7, 1991										
M.(K.) v. M.(H.), [1992] 3 SCR 3	February 14, 1991	February 14, 1991										
R. v. Reddick, [1991] 1 SCR 297	December 19, 1990	February 14, 1991										
Norberg v. Wynrib, [1992] 2 SCR 224	February 14, 1991	February 14, 1991										
R. v. Douglas, [1991] 1 SCR 301	October 12, 1990	February 28, 1991										
Immeubles Port Louis Ltée v. Lafontaine (Village), [1991] 1 SCR 326	April 27, 1990	February 28, 1991										
Roberge v. Bolduc, [1991] 1 SCR 374	October 4, 1990	February 28, 1991										
R. v. Barnes, [1991] 1 SCR 449	October 4, 1990	February 28, 1991										
Case name	Argued	Decided	Lamer	La Forest	L'Heureux-Dubé	Sopinka	Gonthier	Cory	McLachlin	Stevenson	Iacobucci	Major
R. v. Sullivan, [1991] 1 SCR 489	October 30, 1990	March 21, 1991										
R. v. Sherratt, [1991] 1 SCR 509	December 13, 1990	March 21, 1991										
Laferrière v. Lawson, [1991] 1 SCR 541	March 22	March 21, 1991										
Canada (Attorney General) v. Public Service Alliance of Canada, [1991] 1 SCR 614	May 22, 1990	March 21, 1991										
R. v. M. (D.B.), [1991] 1 SCR 669	March 26, 1991	March 26, 1991										
Vickery v. Nova Scotia Supreme Court (Prothonotary), [1991] 1 SCR 671	October 31, November 1, 1990	March 28, 1991										
R. v. Smith, [1991] 1 SCR 714	January 25, 1991	March 28, 1991										
R. v. Szabo, [1991] 1 SCR 736	January 28, 1991	March 28, 1991										
R. v. W.(D.), [1991] 1 SCR 742	February 1, 1991	March 28, 1991				1			2			
R. v. C.(M.H.), [1991] 1 SCR 763	January 22, 1991	April 18, 1991										
Case name	Argued	Decided	Lamer	La Forest	L'Heureux-Dubé	Sopinka	Gonthier	Cory	McLachlin	Stevenson	Iacobucci	Major
Monk Corp. v. Island Fertilizers Ltd., [1991] 1 SCR 779	January 30, 1991	April 18, 1991										
R. v. Corbeil, [1991] 1 SCR 830	January 31, 1991	April 18, 1991										
United States v. Allard, [1991] 1 SCR 861	October 5, 1990	April 18, 1991										
R. v. Evans, [1991] 1 SCR 869	January 21, 1991	April 18, 1991										
R. v. Fisher, [1991] 1 SCR 902	May 1, 1991	May 1, 1991										
R. v. Cole, [1991] 1 SCR 904	May 1, 1991	May 1, 1991										
R. v. Swain, [1991] 1 SCR 933	February 19, 1990	May 2, 1991										
R. v. Chiarantano, [1991] 1 SCR 906	May 8, 1991	May 8, 1991										
Société Nationale de Fiducie v. Quebec (Deputy Minister of Revenue), [1991] 1 SCR 907	May 10, 1991	May 10, 1991										
R. v. L. (W.K.), [1991] 1 SCR 1091	February 22, 1991	May 16, 1991										
Case name	Argued	Decided	Lamer	La Forest	L'Heureux-Dubé	Sopinka	Gonthier	Cory	McLachlin	Stevenson	Iacobucci	Major
R. v. S. (P.L.), [1991] 1 SCR 909	January 25, 1991	May 16, 1991										
National Bank of Canada v. Atomic Slipper Co., [1991] 1 SCR 1059	January 28, 1991	May 16, 1991										
R. v. Reddick, [1991] 1 SCR 1086	March 19, 1991	May 16, 1991										
R. v. Reddick, [1991] 1 SCR 1105	May 27, 1991	May 27, 1991										
Maska Auto Spring Ltée v. Ste-Rosalie (Village), [1991] 2 SCR 3	June 4, 1991	June 4, 1991										
Tétreault-Gadoury v. Canada (Employment and Immigration Commission), [1991] 2 SCR 22	January 30, 1991	June 6, 1991										
Cuddy Chicks Ltd. v. Ontario (Labour Relations Board), [1991] 2 SCR 5	November 7, 1990	June 6, 1991										
Maracle v. Travellers Indemnity Co. of Canada, [1991] 2 SCR 50	February 28, 1991	June 6, 1991										
Marchischuk v. Dominion Industrial Supplies Ltd., [1991] 2 SCR 61	February 28, 1991	June 6, 1991										
Osborne v. Canada (Treasury Board), [1991] 2 SCR 69	October 11, 1990	June 6, 1991										
Case name	Argued	Decided	Lamer	La Forest	L'Heureux-Dubé	Sopinka	Gonthier	Cory	McLachlin	Stevenson	Iacobucci	Major
Reference re Prov. Electoral Boundaries (Sask.), [1991] 2 SCR 158	April 29, 30, 1991	June 6, 1991										
Alberta Union of Provincial Employees v. University Hospitals Board, [1991] 2 SCR 201	June 10, 1991	June 10, 1991										
Vanier (City) v. Canac-Marquis Grenier Ltée, [1991] 2 SCR 203	June 17, 1991	June 17, 1991										
R. v. A.S.U., [1991] 2 SCR 204	June 18, 1991	June 18, 1991										
R. v. Sheridan, [1991] 2 SCR 205	June 18, 1991	June 18, 1991										
R. v. Desfossés, [1991] 2 SCR 207	June 25, 1991	June 25, 1991										
Lavigne v. Ontario Public Service Employees Union, [1991] 2 SCR 211	June 18, 19, 1990	June 27, 1991										
Geffen v. Goodman Estate, [1991] 2 SCR 353	October 10, 1990	June 27, 1991										
Longueuil (City) v. Lambert-Picotte, [1991] 2 SCR 401	January 31, 1991	June 27, 1991										
Case name	Argued	Decided	Lamer	La Forest	L'Heureux-Dubé	Sopinka	Gonthier	Cory	McLachlin	Stevenson	Iacobucci	Major
Waldick v. Malcolm, [1991] 2 SCR 456	February 26, 1991	June 27, 1991										
Canada (Director of Soldier Settlement) v. Snider Estate, [1991] 2 SCR 481	February 27, 1991	June 27, 1991										
R. v. Brown, [1991] 2 SCR 518	May 9, 1991	June 27, 1991										
R. v. Phillips; R. v. Easton, [1991] 2 SCR 209	June 28, 1991	June 28, 1991										
Reference Re Canada Assistance Plan (B.C.), [1991] 2 SCR 525	December 11, 12, 1990	August 15, 1991										
Ontario (Attorney General) v. Bear Island Foundation, [1991] 2 SCR 570	May 27, 28, 29, 30, 1991	August 15, 1991										
R. v. Seaboyer; R. v. Gayme, [1991] 2 SCR 577		August 22, 1991										
Pearlman v. Manitoba Law Society Judicial Committee, [1991] 2 SCR 869	May 7, 1991	September 26, 1991										
Rainbow Industrial Caterers Ltd. v. Canadian National Railway Co., [1991] 3 SCR 3	May 8, 1991	September 26, 1991										
R. v. Elshaw, [1991] 3 SCR 24	May 9, 1991	September 26, 1991										
Case name	Argued	Decided	Lamer	La Forest	L'Heureux-Dubé	Sopinka	Gonthier	Cory	McLachlin	Stevenson	Iacobucci	Major
R. v. McCraw, [1991] 3 SCR 72	June 4, 1991	September 26, 1991										
R. v. Furtney, [1991] 3 SCR 89	June 20, 1991	September 26, 1991										
R. v. Jones, [1991] 3 SCR 110	June 20, 1991	September 26, 1991										
R. v. Jobidon, [1991] 2 SCR 714	March 28, 1991	September 26, 1991										
Kindler v. Canada (Minister of Justice), [1991] 2 SCR 779	February 21, 1991	September 26, 1991										
Reference Re Ng Extradition (Can.), [1991] 2 SCR 858	February 21, 1991	September 26, 1991										
R. v. Sharma, [1991] 3 SCR 119	October 1, 1991	October 1, 1991										
Ontario (Human Rights Commission) v. National Dental Examining Board of Canada, [1991] 3 SCR 121	October 2, 1991	October 2, 1991										
R. v. Sit, [1991] 3 SCR 124	June 21, 1991	October 3, 1991										
Altobelli v. Pilot Insurance Co., [1991] 3 SCR 132	October 7, 1991	October 7, 1991										
Case name	Argued	Decided	Lamer	La Forest	L'Heureux-Dubé	Sopinka	Gonthier	Cory	McLachlin	Stevenson	Iacobucci	Major
Sinclair v. Quebec (Attorney General), [1991] 3 SCR 134	October 9, 1991	October 9, 1991										
Avrith v. Laval (City), [1991] 3 SCR 137	October 10, 1991	October 10, 1991										
R. v. Grant, [1991] 3 SCR 139	June 10, 1991	October 17, 1991										
Bhatnager v. Canada (Minister of Employment and Immigration), [1991] 3 SCR 317	October 2, 1991	October 17, 1991										
R. v. Wholesale Travel Group Inc., [1991] 3 SCR 154	February 18, 1991	October 24, 1991										
R. v. Gruenke, [1991] 3 SCR 263	May 10, 1991	October 24, 1991										
R. v. Meddoui, [1991] 3 SCR 320	October 29, 1991	October 29, 1991										
R. v. F. (H.), [1991] 3 SCR 322	October 31, 1991	October 31, 1991										
R. v. Stewart, [1991] 3 SCR 324	November 6, 1991	November 6, 1991										
R. v. Stinchcombe, [1991] 3 SCR 326	May 2, 1991	November 7, 1991										
Case name	Argued	Decided	Lamer	La Forest	L'Heureux-Dubé	Sopinka	Gonthier	Cory	McLachlin	Stevenson	Iacobucci	Major
Leiriao v. Val-Bélair (Town), [1991] 3 SCR 349	June 17, 1991	November 7, 1991										
R. v. Hick, [1991] 3 SCR 383	October 4, 1991	November 7, 1991										
R. v. Grover, [1991] 3 SCR 387	November 12, 1991	November 12, 1991										
Communities Economic Development Fund v. Canadian Pickles Corp., [1991] 3 SCR 388	June 3, 1991	November 14, 1991										
Canadian Broadcasting Corp. v. Lessard, [1991] 3 SCR 421	May 31, 1991	November 14, 1991										
Canadian Broadcasting Corp. v. New Brunswick (Attorney General), [1991] 3 SCR 459	May 31, 1991	November 14, 1991										
R. v. Goltz, [1991] 3 SCR 485	June 7, 1991	November 14, 1991										
Canson Enterprises Ltd. v. Boughton & Co., [1991] 3 SCR 534	October 29, 1990	November 21, 1991										
Zaidan Group Ltd. v. London (City), [1991] 3 SCR 593	November 7, 1991	November 21, 1991										
R. v. Broyles, [1991] 3 SCR 595	June 19, 1991	November 28, 1991										
Case name	Argued	Decided	Lamer	La Forest	L'Heureux-Dubé	Sopinka	Gonthier	Cory	McLachlin	Stevenson	Iacobucci	Major
Coronation Insurance Co. v. Taku Air Transport Ltd., [1991] 3 SCR 622	June 21, 1991	November 28, 1991										
R. v. Salituro, [1991] 3 SCR 654	June 26, 1991	November 28, 1991										
R. v. S. (D.), [1991] 3 SCR 681	December 2, 1991	December 2, 1991										
R. v. C. (C.M.), [1991] 3 SCR 683	December 3, 1991	December 3, 1991										
Conseil du Patronat du Québec Inc. v. Quebec (Attorney General), [1991] 3 SCR 685	December 6, 1991	December 6, 1991										
R. v. Tessier, [1991] 3 SCR 687	December 6, 1991	December 6, 1991										
Canada (Human Rights Commission) v. Sun Life Assurance Co. of Canada, [1991] 3 SCR 689	December 9, 1991	December 9, 1991										
R. v. Vaughan, [1991] 3 SCR 691	December 10, 1991	December 10, 1991										
R. v. Gimson, [1991] 3 SCR 692	December 19, 1991	December 19, 1991										
