= James Danko =

American entrepreneur and academic administrator

James M. Danko
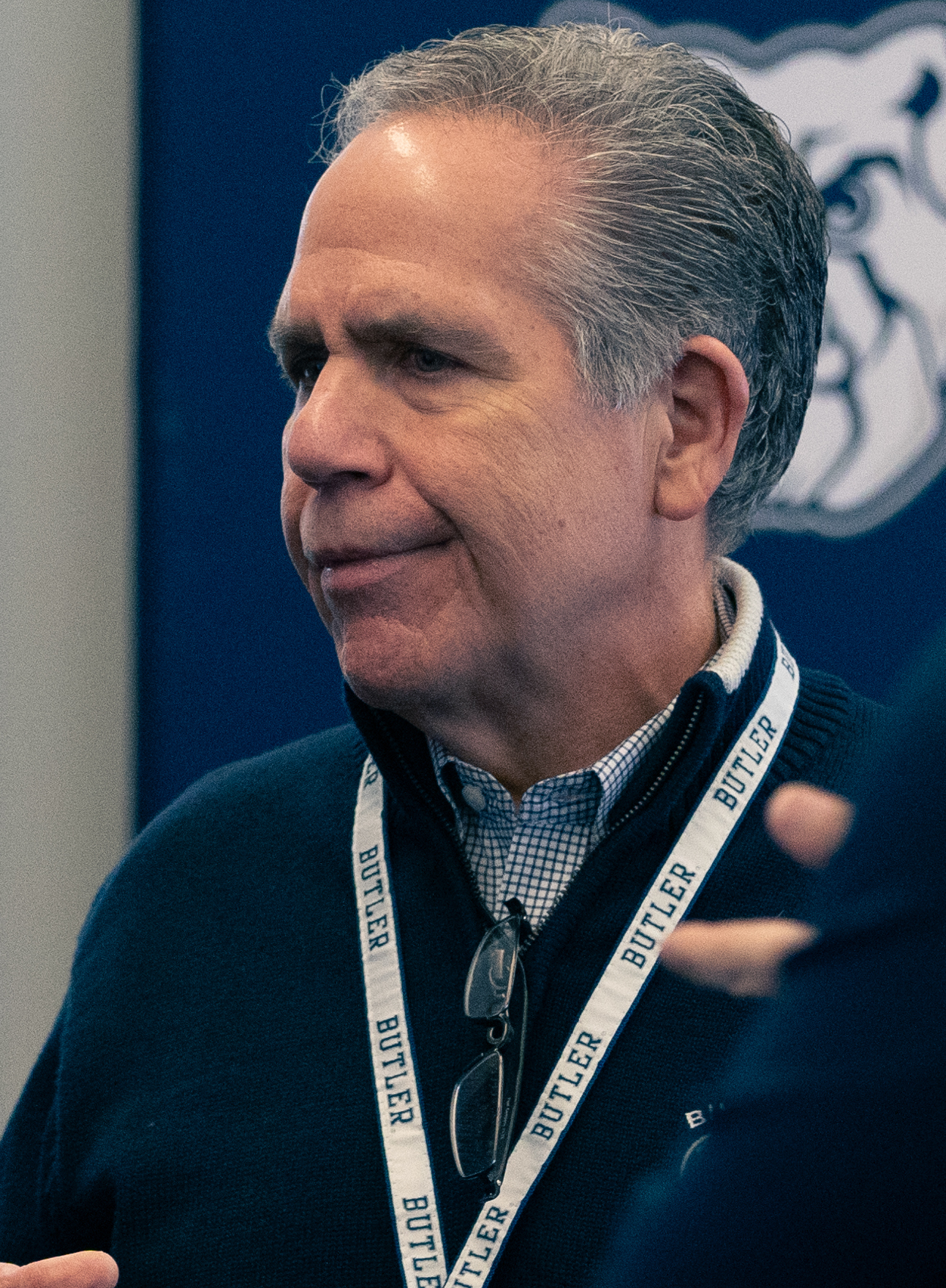
- Danko in 2024

21st President of Butler University
- Incumbent
- Assumed office August 1, 2011
- Preceded by: Bobby Fong

Personal details
- Born: Cleveland, Ohio, U.S.
- Spouse: Bethanie Danko
- Children: 2
- Education: John Carroll University (BA); University of Michigan (MBA)
- Website: Butler University Office of the President

James M. Danko is an American entrepreneur and academic administrator serving as the 21st president of Butler University in Indianapolis, Indiana since 2011.

== Early life and career ==
Danko grew up in Parma, Ohio, a suburb of Cleveland. He started his first business, a medical and fitness equipment company, when he was 19, simultaneously earning a Bachelor of Arts degree in religious studies from John Carroll University. He ran his company for 17 years and it became the largest fitness equipment company in Ohio at the time. Danko sold his company in 1990 and earned a Master of Business Administration from the University of Michigan.

== Career ==
He went on to serve in business school leadership roles at institutions including the University of Michigan, the University of North Carolina at Chapel Hill, Tuck School of Business, and Villanova School of Business. He was appointed dean of the Villanova School of Business in 2005. During his tenure there, VSB moved from an unranked, regional college to a nationally ranked American business school.

=== Butler University ===
Danko became the president of Butler University in November 2011. During his tenure, the university has reported a significant increase in the number of applicants and financial support, and has received several high regional and national rankings. In interviews, Danko has talked of plans to expand the university's reputation and student population, and in 2013, he moved to enter Butler in the Big East Conference. Danko also became vice-chair of the Big East Board of Directors, and currently represents them on the NCAA Division I Presidential Forum.

== Personal life ==
Danko and his wife Bethanie currently reside on the Butler University campus.
