= Blackstone's ratio =

1760s legal maxim by William Blackstone

In criminal law, Blackstone's ratio is the ratio between letting guilty go unpunished (error of impunity) and convicting innocent people, two forms of miscarriage of justice. There is also a long history of similar sentiments going back centuries in a variety of legal traditions. The idea subsequently became a staple of legal thinking in jurisdictions with legal systems derived from English criminal law and continues to be a topic of debate. In the United States, high courts in individual states continue to adopt different numerical values for the ratio.

== By Blackstone ==
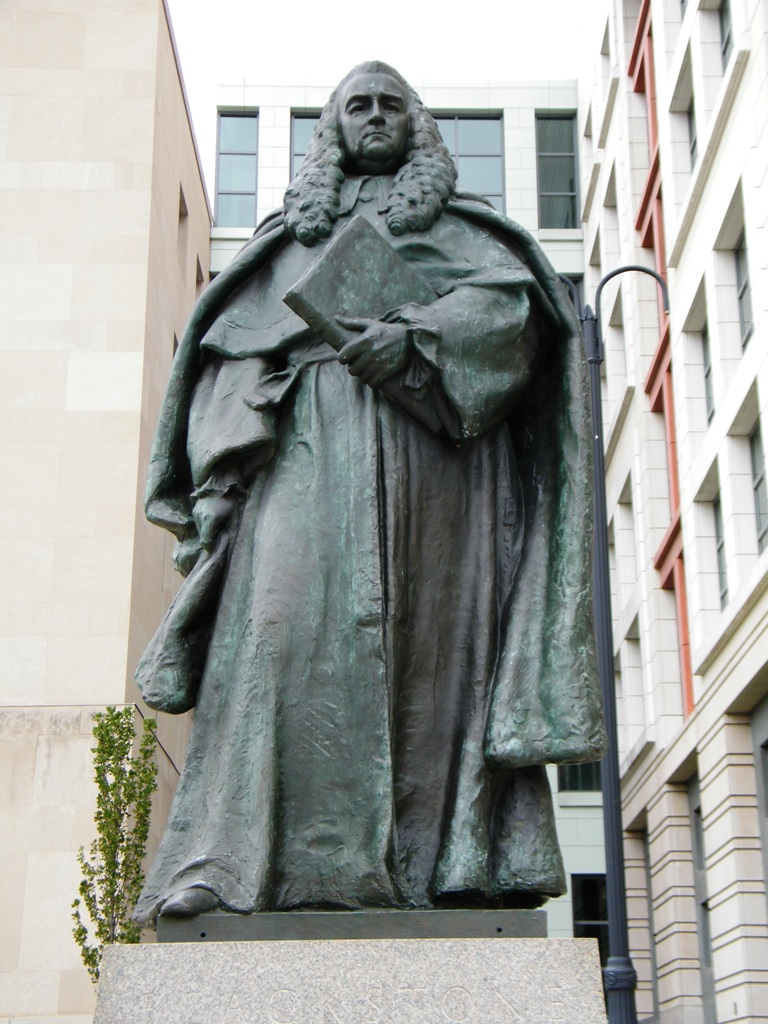
Statue of William Blackstone located at Constitution Ave & 3rd St. NW, Washington, D.C.

The Blackstone's formulation, stated by the English jurist William Blackstone in his seminal work Commentaries on the Laws of England in the 1760s, is:

It is better that ten guilty persons escape than that one innocent suffer.

The phrase, repeated widely and usually in isolation, comes from a longer passage, the fourth in a series of five discussions of rules of presumption by Blackstone:

Fourthly, all presumptive evidence of felony should be admitted cautiously, for the law holds that it is better that ten guilty persons escape than that one innocent suffer. And Sir Matthew Hale in particular lays down two rules most prudent and necessary to be observed: 1. Never to convict a man for stealing the goods of a person unknown, merely because he will give no account how he came by them, unless an actual felony be proved of such goods; and, 2. Never to convict any person of murder or manslaughter till at least the body be found dead; on account of two instances he mentions where persons were executed for the murder of others who were then alive but missing.

The phrase was absorbed by the British legal system, becoming a maxim by the early 19th century. It was also absorbed into American common law, cited repeatedly by that country's Founding Fathers, later becoming a form of words drilled into law students all the way into the 21st century.

Other commentators have echoed the principle. Benjamin Franklin stated it as: "it is better 100 guilty Persons should escape than that one innocent Person should suffer".

Defending British soldiers charged with murder for their role in the Boston Massacre, John Adams also expanded upon the rationale behind Blackstone's Ratio when he stated:

We find, in the rules laid down by the greatest English Judges, who have been the brightest of mankind; We are to look upon it as more beneficial, that many guilty persons should escape unpunished, than one innocent person should suffer. The reason is, because it’s of more importance to community, that innocence should be protected, than it is, that guilt should be punished; for guilt and crimes are so frequent in the world, that all of them cannot be punished; and many times they happen in such a manner, that it is not of much consequence to the public, whether they are punished or not. But when innocence itself, is brought to the bar and condemned, especially to die, the subject will exclaim, it is immaterial to me, whether I behave well or ill; for virtue itself, is no security. And if such a sentiment as this, should take place in the mind of the subject, there would be an end to all security what so ever.

== Historic expressions of the principle ==
The immediate precursors of Blackstone's ratio in English law were articulations by Hale (about 100 years earlier) and John Fortescue (about 300 years before Blackstone), both influential jurists in their time. Hale wrote: "for it is better five guilty persons should escape unpunished, than one innocent person should die." Fortescue's De Laudibus Legum Angliae (c. 1470) states that "one would much rather that twenty guilty persons should escape the punishment of death, than that one innocent person should be condemned and suffer capitally."

Some 300 years before Fortescue, the Jewish legal theorist Maimonides wrote that "the Exalted One has shut this door" against the use of presumptive evidence, for "it is better and more satisfactory to acquit a thousand guilty persons than to put a single innocent one to death."

Maimonides argued that executing an accused criminal on anything less than absolute certainty would progressively lead to convictions merely "according to the judge's caprice" and was expounding on both Exodus 23:7 ("do not bring death on those who are innocent and in the right") and an Islamic text, the Jami' al-Tirmidhi.

Islamic scholar Al-Tirmidhi quotes Muhammad as saying, "Avoid legal punishments as far as possible, and if there are any doubts in the case then use them, for it is better for a judge to err towards leniency than towards punishment". A similar expression reads, "Invoke doubtfulness in evidence during prosecution to avoid legal punishments".

A vaguely similar principle, echoing the number ten and the idea that it would be preferable that many guilty people escape consequences than a few innocents suffer them, appears as early as the narrative of Sodom and Gomorrah in Genesis. Similarly, on 3 October 1692, while decrying the Salem witch trials, Increase Mather adapted Fortescue's statement and wrote, "It were better that Ten Suspected Witches should escape, than that one Innocent Person should be Condemned."

The Russian writer Fyodor Dostoevsky in his work The Brothers Karamazov, written in 1880, referred to the phrase "It is better to acquit ten guilty than to punish one innocent!" (Russian: "Лучше оправдать десять виновных, чем наказать одного невиновного!"), which has existed in Russian legislation since 1712, during the reign of Peter the Great.

Even Voltaire in 1748 in the work of Zadig used a similar saying, although in French his thought is stated differently than in the English translation: "It is from him that the nations hold this great principle, that it is better to risk saving a guilty man than to condemn an innocent man."

== Evolving significance over time ==
Given that Sir Matthew Hale and Sir John Fortescue in English law had made similar statements previously, some kind of explanation is required for the enormous popularity and influence of the phrase across all the legal systems derived from English law in the wake of the publication of Blackstone's Commentaries.

Cullerne Bown has argued that both the rise and fall in significance of the Ratio can be explained by the growing mathematisation of society. It rises to prominence at about the same time as Cesare Beccaria articulated the social principle of the greatest good for the greatest number, the starting point for Utilitarianism and, like the Ratio, quantitative in a loose way. Thus, the Ratio's rise "can be seen as a new kind of buttress of the law that was required in a new kind of society." He has explained its more recent decline as a reflection of a more sophisticated mathematical awareness in society, as reflected in the development of diagnostic testing in the 1920s. From a mathematical point of view, the Ratio is methodologically flawed, and once the Ratio lost its claim to the authority of mathematics, its usefulness declined. Today, its former role in justifying the policies of the criminal courts is primarily occupied by Herbert L. Packer's Two Models theory, an expanded doctrine of rights and arguments drawn from law and economics.

== In current jurisprudential scholarship ==
Blackstone's principle influenced the nineteenth-century emergence of the "beyond a reasonable doubt" standard in criminal law. Many modern commentators draw a connection between the familiar "ten guilty persons" ratio and a specific probability threshold in criminal trials. For example, Jack B. Weinstein wrote that Blackstone's ratio would place the probability standard at roughly 90% certainty of guilt:

Blackstone would have put the probability standard for proof "beyond a reasonable doubt" at somewhat more than 90%, for he declared: "It is better that ten guilty persons escape than one innocent suffer."

Empirical research supports the idea that numerical guidelines may affect jurors' decisions. Studies by Dorothy K. Kagehiro (1990) and by Kagehiro & W. Clark Stanton (1985) show that mock juries presented with explicit percentages or probabilities demonstrate more consistent verdicts than those relying solely on verbal definitions of "beyond a reasonable doubt".

Building on these findings, Daniel Pi, Francesco Parisi & Barbara Luppi (2020) propose that Blackstone's ratio could be translated into formal jury instructions – for instance, specifying a probability threshold (e.g., ~90% certainty) consistent with "ten guilty persons escaping for every one innocent punished". While some legal theorists remain cautious about expressing the burden of proof in mathematically precise terms, proponents argue that quantification aligns closely with the historical logic of Blackstone's ratio and helps clarify the meaning of reasonable doubt for fact-finders. The Blackstone's ratio can be represented as the false negative to false positive ratio. It has been given a decision-theoretic generalization to obtain an appropriate probability threshold for a finding of guilt – a threshold which may vary with the severity of the punishment for the crime under consideration.

== Arguments for different ratios ==
=== Balanced ===
Opinion polls in the US found a majority of people view false acquittal and false conviction as equally bad, resulting in a Blackstone's ratio of one.

=== Stricter ===
According to the Communist defector, Jung Chang, the following reasoning was deployed during the uprisings in Jiangxi, China, in the 1930s: "Better to kill a hundred innocent people than let one truly guilty person go free"; and during uprisings in Vietnam in the 1950s: "Better to kill ten innocent people than let a guilty person escape." In Cambodia, Pol Pot's Khmer Rouge adopted a similar policy: "better arrest an innocent person than leave a guilty one free." Wolfgang Schäuble referenced this principle while saying that it is not applicable to the context of preventing terrorist attacks. Former American Vice President Dick Cheney said that his support of American use of "enhanced interrogation techniques" against suspected terrorists was unchanged by the fact that 25% of CIA detainees subject to that treatment were later proven to be innocent, including one who died of hypothermia in CIA custody. "I'm more concerned with bad guys who got out and released than I am with a few that in fact were innocent." Asked whether the 25% margin was too high, Cheney responded, "I have no problem as long as we achieve our objective. ... I'd do it again in a minute."

=== More lenient ===
Volokh considers two criminal cases in which the defence told the jury "that no innocent person should be convicted and that it is better that many guilty go unpunished than one innocent person be convicted" as references to a Blackstone's ratio with values of both "infinite" and "many" guilty men to an innocent one. He notes its importance in the inspiration of Western criminal law, but concludes by citing a question of its soundness:

The story is told of a Chinese law professor, who listened as a British lawyer explained that Britons were so enlightened that they believed it was better that ninety-nine guilty men go free than that one innocent man be executed. The Chinese professor thought for a second and asked, "Better for whom?"

== See also ==
- Type I and type II errors
- In dubio pro reo
- Presumption of guilt
- Presumption of innocence
- Victims' rights

== Sources ==
- Volokh, Alexander (1997). "n Guilty Men". University of Pennsylvania Law Review. 146 (1): 173–216. Archived from the original on 7 October 2014.
