= Ursinus College =

Private college in Collegeville, Pennsylvania, US

- Motto: Super firmum fundamentum Dei (Latin)
- Motto in English: "On the firm foundation of God"
- Type: Private liberal arts college
- Established: 1869; 157 years ago
- Accreditation: MSCHE
- Religious affiliation: Nonsectarian, historically German Reformed Church
- Academic affiliations: Annapolis Group; CLAC; NAICU
- Endowment: $165 million (2025)
- President: Gundolf Graml
- Faculty: 397 full-time, 110 part-time
- Undergraduates: 1,502 (Fall 2024)
- Location: Collegeville, Pennsylvania, United States; 40.1934°N 75.4559°W
- Campus: 170 acres (69 ha); Large suburb
- Newspaper: The Grizzly
- Colors: Red, gold, and black
- Nickname: Bears
- Sporting affiliations: NCAA Division III - Centennial
- Mascot: Grizzly Bear
- Website: ursinus.edu

Ursinus College is a private liberal arts college in Collegeville, Pennsylvania, United States. It was founded in 1869 and occupies a 170-acre (0.69 km^{2}) campus. Ursinus College's forerunner was the Freeland Seminary founded in 1848. It enrolls about 1,500 undergraduate students.

== History ==
=== 19th century ===
In 1867, members of the German Reformed Church began plans to establish a Christian college. The founders hoped to establish an alternative to the seminary at Mercersburg, Pennsylvania (the present-day Lancaster Theological Seminary), a school they believed was increasingly heretical to traditional Reformed faith.

Two years later, the college was granted a charter by the Legislature of Pennsylvania to begin operations on the grounds of Todd's School (founded 1832) and the adjacent Freeland Seminary (founded 1848). John Bomberger served as the college's first president from 1869 until his death in 1890. Bomberger proposed naming the college after Zacharias Ursinus, a 16th-century German theologian and a figure in the Protestant Reformation.

In 1870, instruction began at the college in September; on October 4, the Zwinglian Literary Society was founded. For many years the annual opening meetings of "Zwing" and its rival society, Schaff, were the major events of the student year.

Women were first admitted in 1881, as a direct consequence of the closing of the Pennsylvania Female College in 1880. A separate literary society for women, The Olevian, was formed in 1885.

The town of Freeland was officially incorporated as the Borough of Collegeville in 1896. The Reading Railroad had named it that in 1869 because of the Pennsylvania Female College and not, as many believe, because of Ursinus, which had just been founded.

The Ruby, Ursinus' yearbook, was first published by the Class of 1897. The name was a tribute to Professor Samuel Vernon Ruby, who collapsed as he was entering Bomberger Hall in 1896 and died in its chapel, surrounded by students and teachers who had gathered there for morning prayers.

=== 20th Century ===
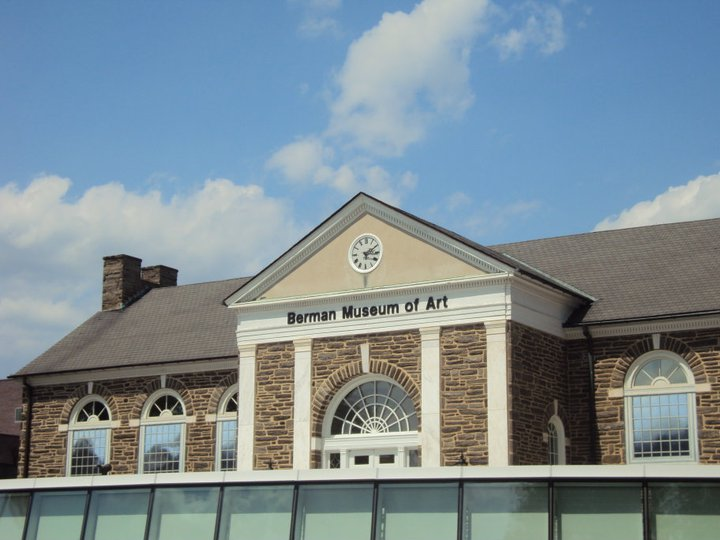
Berman Museum of Art

At the start of the US's involvement in World War II, Ursinus' male enrollment decreased from 535 to 350 students. During the war, Ursinus made a concerted effort to bring in military students from across the country, even acquiring a Naval V-12 unit. It also accepted 3 students between 1939 and 1940 who were exiled from Austria and Germany because of the war.

In 1988, the F.W. Olin Foundation awarded a $5.37 million grant to Ursinus to construct a humanities building.

The Philip and Muriel Berman Museum of Art opened on campus in 1989.

Ursinus joined the Centennial Conference at its inception in 1993, a regional athletic conference, consisting of Swarthmore College, Bryn Mawr College, Haverford College, Dickinson College, Gettysburg College, Johns Hopkins University, Franklin & Marshall College, and others.

In 1995, the college appointed John Strassburger as its 12th president, the first president from outside the Ursinus alumni group. During Strassburger's tenure as president, Ursinus became affiliated with numerous prestigious groups such as the Annapolis Group, the Watson Foundation, the Kemper Scholars group, and Project Pericles.

=== 21st Century ===
Ursinus College was profiled in New York Times education editor Loren Pope's popular guidebook, Colleges That Change Lives in 2006.

In 2006, the college attempted to capitalize on J. D. Salinger's brief time there by establishing a "J. D. Salinger Scholarship" which would allow a freshman to study creative writing and live in Salinger's dormitory room for a year. However, the reclusive author's representatives wrote to the college within a week to ask that his name be removed. The college conceded and named it simply the College Creative Writing Award though it is known colloquially as the "Not the J.D. Salinger Scholarship."

In 2011, Ursinus was designated as a Top Ten Up and Coming College by U.S. News & World Report.

Bobby Fong, former president of Butler University, began his tenure as the 13th president of Ursinus on July 1, 2011. Fong died suddenly of natural causes at his home in Collegeville in 2014. Terry Winegar, the Dean and Executive Vice President for Academic Affairs, was appointed Interim President.

Brock Blomberg, Dean of the Robert Day School of Economics and Finance at Claremont McKenna College, was named 17th president of Ursinus in 2015. Blomberg announced that he planned to depart Ursinus in September 2021 for the California Institute of Integral Studies.

Robyn Hannigan, former provost of Clarkson University and patented inventor in the field of medical technology, was named the 19th President of Ursinus College in 2022. Hannigan began her duties on July 1, 2022, and was abruptly removed from her position on October 23, 2025. Ursinus College Provost Gundolf Graml served as interim president following Hannigan's removal and on April 8, 2026, he was named president.

== Academics ==
Students choose from 60 courses of study. Popular majors at the college are biology, English, psychology, international relations, business and economics, and health and exercise physiology.

=== Common Intellectual Experience ===
The Common Intellectual Experience (CIE) is Ursinus' unique seminar course required of all first-year students and is a requisite for the bachelor's degree. It was established in 1999. It is composed of two semester-long seminar courses that help students to figure out their degree path and their path after college. Students read from a range of philosophers and academic thinkers, and discuss them with their classmates.

In September 2012, Ursinus and Columbia University were awarded a joint grant from the Mellon Foundation to work together on the core of their seminar courses – Ursinus College's CIE, and Columbia University's Core Curriculum. The $300,000 grant allowed Ursinus faculty with prior experience teaching CIE classes to work with, and mentor, post-doctoral students at Columbia, created post-doctoral fellowship program at Ursinus, and also supported campus visits and guest lectures from Columbia faculty who have expertise in the subject matter of CIE.

== Student life ==
The school's 1,500 students come from 35 states and 12 countries. 22% are students of color and 2% are international students. The school ranges from a 11:1 to a 10:1 student-to-faculty ratio.

=== Greek life ===
The Ursinus College Greek community consists 12 societies – 5 sororities, 4 fraternities, and 3 gender-inclusive societies. The Ursinus College Inter-Greek Council serves as the elected governing body of all social Greek organizations.

=== Clubs and organizations ===
The Leadership Development and Student Activities Office provides the student body with leadership opportunities through its more than 100 student clubs and organizations. Ursinus College clubs and organizations include student government, community service, academic honor societies, political clubs and intramural sports. Their student-run newspaper is called, The Grizzly – the name taken from the Latin root of Zacharias Ursinus' surname (ursus translating as 'bear'). Ursinus also publishes The Lantern, one of the oldest, continuously produced student literary journals.

== Athletics ==
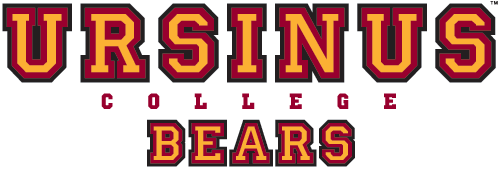
Ursinus Bears wordmark

As of 2019, 40% of Ursinus students competed on one of its athletic teams. Ursinus is a member of the Centennial Conference, founded in 1993, and which now contains eleven private colleges in the mid-Atlantic region, including Bryn Mawr, McDaniel, Johns Hopkins, Dickinson, Haverford, Franklin and Marshall, Swarthmore, Gettysburg, Muhlenberg, and Washington.

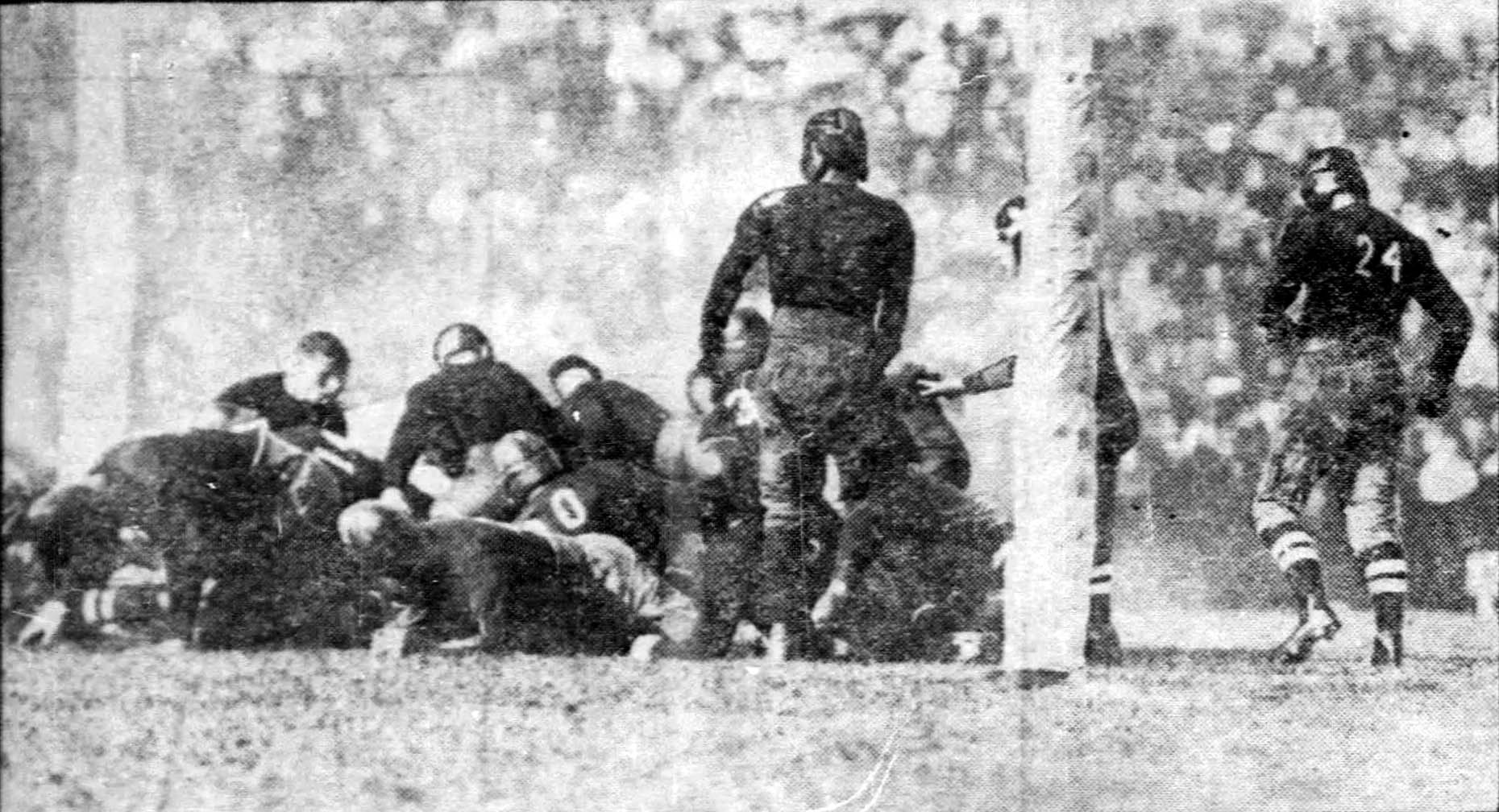
Ursinus v Columbia, 1923 football game

In the immediate years following its founding, there were no organized athletics at Ursinus College. Baseball matches held against neighboring towns, hiking along the Perkiomen Creek and in the nearby area that is now Valley Forge National Historical Park, and skating, bathing and boating in the Perkiomen were popular pastimes for students. In fact, students used to be able to rent canoes and fishing rods from the same location where they can now rent bikes. Students then organized a tennis club in 1888, and intercollegiate baseball began with play against Swarthmore College, Haverford College, and Muhlenberg College between 1886 and 1890. The college's first football team was also fielded in 1890 but did not play against another team until 1893 in which they lost 62–0 against Pennsylvania Military College.

The college was well known for many years for its Patterson Field endzone, in which a large sycamore tree grew undisturbed from the 1920s. Ripley's Believe it or Not featured the famous tree for being the only one on an active field of athletic play. A new sycamore, growing since 1984 from a seedling taken from the old tree, stood nearby until a turf field project required its removal in 2011.

In 1974, the NCAA Award of Valor was presented to the 1973 basketball team. Every member of the team had entered a burning building, with their combined efforts leading to the rescue of 14 persons. In the 2003–2004 season, senior shooting guard Dennis Stanton led all NCAA Men's Basketball scorers, averaging 32.6 points per game.

The Ursinus women's field hockey team has historically been very successful. During the tenure of Eleanor Frost Snell as coach of women's athletics from 1931, the "Snell's Belles" had many winning seasons. More recently they were the 2006 National Champion for NCAA Division III. The team earned spots in the national championship game three times before, between 1975 and 1977, as a Division I program, and the United States Field Hockey Hall of Fame's permanent home is at the college.

Ursinus' women's lacrosse team were the 1986, 1989, and 1990 NCAA Division III Women's lacrosse champions and the 1985, 1987, and 1991 runners-up.

In November 2019, Ursinus College canceled their Women’s and Men’s swim teams after finding that team members violated the college’s anti-hazing policy and student code of conduct. As an additional consequence, Ursinus College placed Men’s and Women’s Swim Team Head Coach Mark Feinberg on probation.

In 2020, the NCAA Division III Committee on Infractions found that a former Ursinus College Vice President and Dean of Enrollment Management improperly awarded financial aid to prospective students based on their participation in athletics and input from coaches. The committee found that approximately $335,300 in financial aid packages was improperly awarded to student-athletes over 17 sports. As a disciplinary measure, the committee publicly reprimanded Ursinus College and placed them on probation while also requiring them to attend the 2020 and 2021 NCAA Regional Rules Seminars. Additionally, Ursinus College self-imposed numerous penalties upon themselves.

== Campus and facilities ==
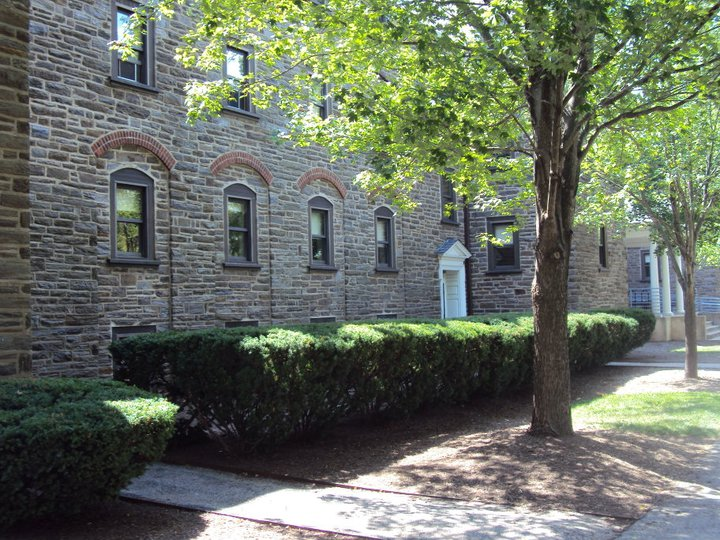
Curtis Hall, where J.D. Salinger lived during his time at Ursinus

The 170-acre (0.69 km^{2}) campus is 25 miles (40 km) northwest of Philadelphia, Pennsylvania, and is also within three hours’ driving distance of New York City, Baltimore, Maryland, and Washington, D.C.

SEPTA bus #93 has six stops (three southeastward, three northwestward) on Ursinus’ Campus. The route extends southeast to Norristown and northwest to Pottstown.

The nearest SEPTA regional rail line is the Manayunk/Norristown Line, which extends southeastward to Philadelphia, Pennsylvania. The closest station on the Manayunk/Norristown line to Ursinus College is the Norristown Transportation Center, located 8 miles (13km) from Ursinus College.

Notable facilities at Ursinus include:

=== Bomberger Memorial Hall ===
Bomberger Memorial Hall was opened in 1892 and renovated in 2006. Bomberger Hall is named for John Bomberger, the first President of Ursinus College. Bomberger Auditorium is home to the Heefner Memorial Organ, a three-manual 62-rank organ dedicated in 1986. It was a gift from Mrs. Lydia V. Heefner in memory of her husband, Russell E. Heefner.

=== The Philip and Muriel Berman Museum of Art ===
The museum was dedicated in 1989, located in the original Alumni Memorial Library, built in 1921, expanded in 2010. The museum program is fully accredited by the American Alliance of Museums and houses over 4,000 paintings, prints, drawings, sculpture, decorative, and cultural objects representing a broad array of art historical genres.

The Alumni Memorial Library was dedicated to the 271 Ursinus students and alumni who served in WWII including 8 who died in action. It was built upon a former boarding house.

=== Eger Gateway ===
An iron and stone gateway was erected in 1925 and named for George P. Eger, father of alumnus Sherman A. Eger. The gate reads "Ursinus College" and there is a lantern atop it. Tablets inset into the gate's stone columns tell the history of Ursinus College.

=== Brodbeck-Wilkinson-Curtis Hall ===
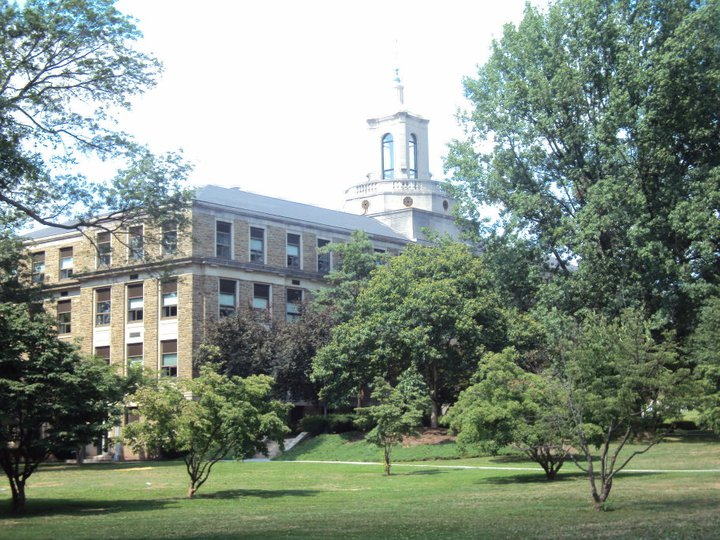
Pfahler Hall of Science

Brodbeck and Curtis Halls opened in 1927. Wilkinson Hall, named for Joseph C. Wilkinson, opened in 1966 connecting Brodbeck and Curtis.

=== Pfahler Hall & the Walter W. Marstellar Memorial Observatory ===
Pfahler Hall opened in 1932, renovated and expanded in 1998. Named in honor of George E. Pfahler. Within this building Professor John Mauchly worked on the ENIAC, the world's first computer. Alumnus and Nobel Laureate Gerald Edelman also attended classes here.

The hall is built on grounds where the first women's dormitory, Olevian Hall, stood from 1865 until 1931.

In the 1950s, alumnus Walter W. Marsteller used military surplus materials and aircraft scrap to build an observatory atop the building. However, it was dismantled in the late 1990s.

The labs are equipped with a 300-MHz nuclear magnetic resonance spectrometer, Fourier-transform spectrometers, an isothermal calorimeter, gas chromatography/mass spectrometers, a voltammetric analyzer, UV visible absorbance spectrometers, high performance liquid chromatographs, an atomic absorption spectrometer, a capillary electrophoresis apparatus, a Mössbauer spectrometer, and a fluorescence spectrometer.

=== Beardwood-Paisley-Stauffer Hall ===
Beardwood-Paisley-Stauffer Hall was opened in 1957 and jointly named in honor of Hannah Beardwood and her husband Matthew, a former chemistry professor, Harry Paisley, former president of the Ursinus board of directors, and Rev. George A. Stauffer.

=== Thomas Hall ===
Opened in 1970 and renovated in 1991, Thomas Hall it is the home of the Biology and Psychology departments and the following endowed laboratories: Levi Jay Hammond Laboratory of Comparative Anatomy, the W. Wayne Babcock Laboratory of General Biology, the Anna Heinly Schellhammer Laboratory, and the Parlee Laboratory.

=== Myrin Library ===
Myrin Library was opened in 1971 and was renovated in 1988 and again in 2004–2005. The old Freeland-Stine-Derr dormitory complex was demolished in 1968 to make way for the library. Myrin houses more than 420,000 volumes, 202,000 microforms, 32,000 audio-visual materials, 3,800 e-books, and offers on-site and remote access to approximately 25,900 print, microform and electronic periodical titles. The library is also one of only three U.S. Government depositories in Montgomery County, Pennsylvania and, as such, receives print and electronic federal documents for the collection. Myrin Library is home to the Pennsylvania Folklife Society Collection (an extensive Pennsylvania German archive), the Linda Grace Hoyer Papers, the Grundy Collection on South African history, and the college's archives, the Ursinusiana Collection.

=== Olin Hall ===
Opened in 1990 and named for the F.W. Olin Foundation, Olin Hall contains a 320-seat lecture hall, a 63-seat tiered classroom, a 42-seat tiered classroom, a Writing Center, eight traditional classrooms and four seminar rooms.

=== Floy Lewis Bakes Center ===
The Floy Lewis Bakes Center was dedicated in 2001 upon the expansion and renovation of Helfferich Hall, 1972. The Field House encompasses the D. L. Helfferich Hall of Health and Physical Education and the William Elliott Pool. The field house pavilion opened in 2001, while the other buildings were dedicated in 1972 in honor, respectively, of the ninth president of Ursinus College and William Elliott. Helfferich Hall now includes completely renovated locker and training rooms, and a two-story, glass-enclosed area for fitness and recreation. The physical education complex serves both men and women with three full-size basketball courts; locker rooms and team rooms; wrestling room; weight room; dance studio; classrooms; a regulation collegiate-sized swimming pool; squash and handball courts, and a gymnastics space.

=== Kaleidoscope Performing Arts Center ===
The center opened in April 2005 with a performance by jazz musician Wynton Marsalis. Within it is the Lenfest Theater, a 350-seat state-of-the-art proscenium arch theater. There is also a black box "experimental" studio theater, a box office and concession booth, a rehearsal studio, a scenic workshop, as well as teaching support space and a gallery and work space for art students.

=== Innovation and Discovery Center (IDC) ===
The $29 million center opened in October 2018. It houses the Parlee Center for Science and the Common Good and the U-Imagine Center for Integrative and Entrepreneurial Studies.

=== Other buildings ===
- Wismer Center, opened in 1964, named for Ralph Fry Wismer, class of 1905
- Reimert Hall, opened in 1966, named for William D. Reimert, class of 1924
- Corson Hall, dedicated in 1970
- Ritter Center, opened in 1980
- Richter-North Residence Hall, opened in 2002, named for former college President Richard P. Richter
- New Residence Hall, opened in 2007

=== Gallery ===
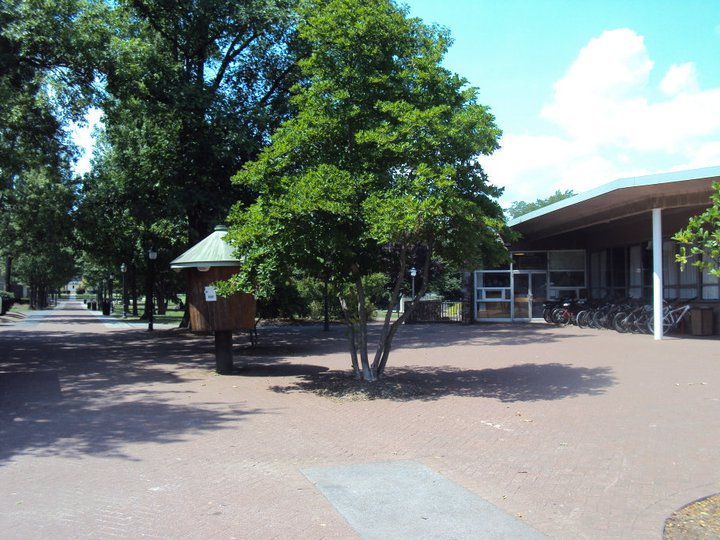
Olin Plaza

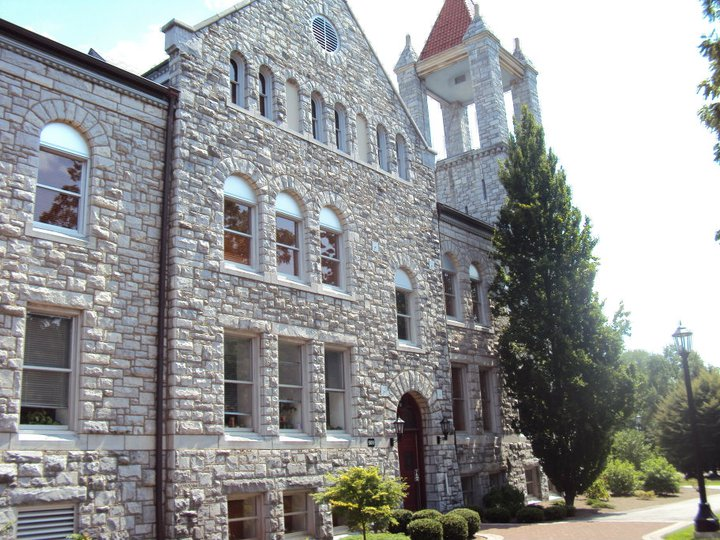
Bomberger Hall

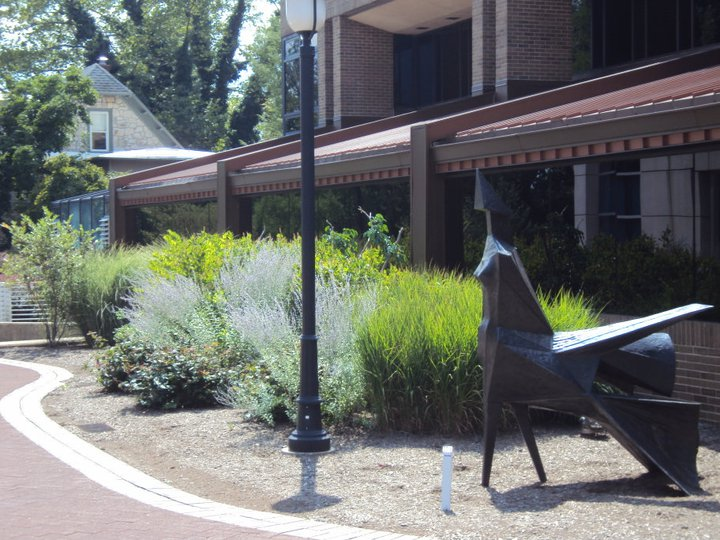
Thomas Hall

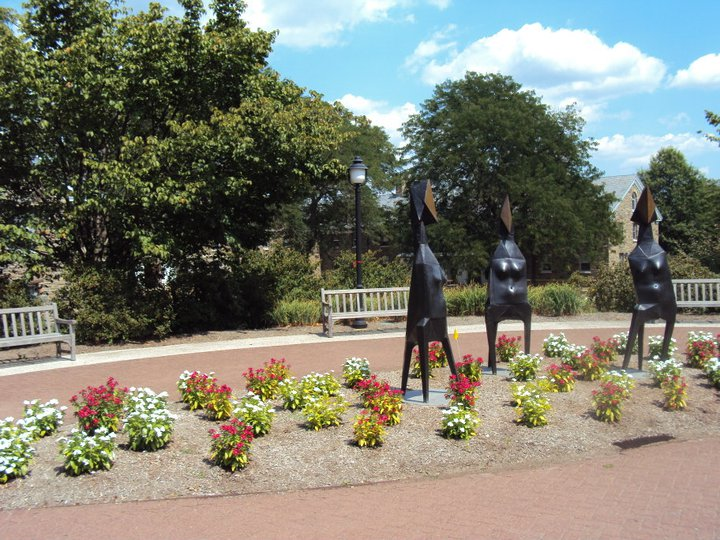
Chadwick sculptures

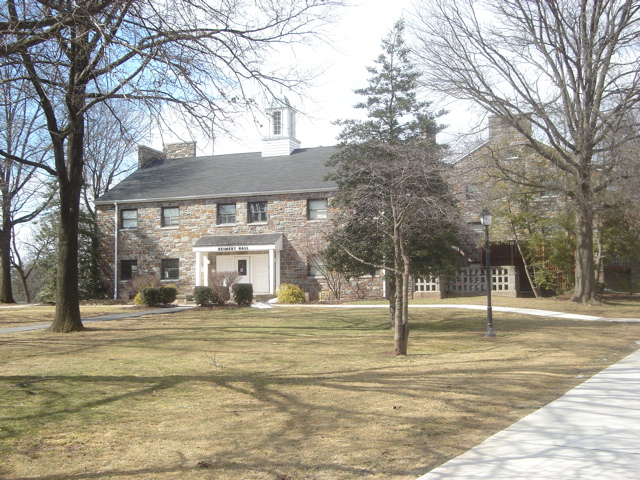
Reimert Hall

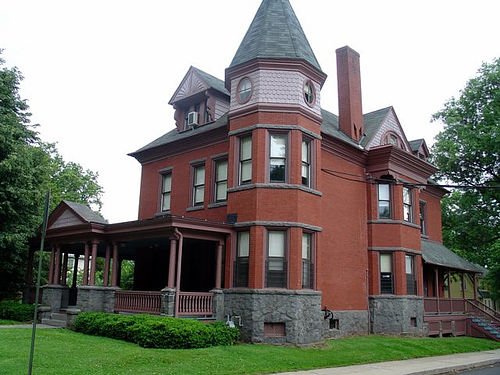
Hobson Hall

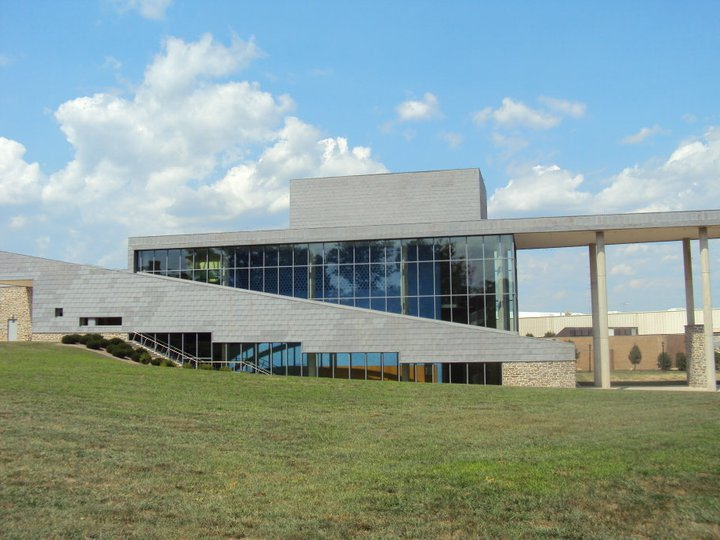
Kaleidoscope Performing Arts Center

== Notable people ==
Notable people associated with Ursinus College include:

- John R. Brooke, Union general of American Civil War and Spanish–American War
- B. J. Callaghan, soccer coach
- Gerald Edelman, Nobel Prize laureate
- Dan Mullen, college football coach
- J. D. Salinger (attended one semester; did not graduate), author of The Catcher in the Rye
