= International Review of Law and Economics =

- Discipline: Law, economics
- Language: English
- Edited by: Emanuela Carbonara, Yun-Chien Chang, N. Garoupa, E.A. Helland, J. Klick

Publication details
- History: 1981–present
- Publisher: Elsevier
- Impact factor: 0.570 (2016)

Standard abbreviations
- Bluebook: Int'l Rev. L. & Econ.
- ISO 4: Int. Rev. Law Econ.

Indexing
- ISSN: 0144-8188 (print); 1873-6394 (web)

Links
- Journal homepage; Online access

The International Review of Law and Economics is an academic journal covering the intersection of law and economics. It was established in 1981 by Butterworths and is currently published by Elsevier. The editors-in-chief are Emanuela Carbonara (University of Bologna), Yun-Chien Chang (Academia Sinica), N. Garoupa (Texas A&M University and Católica Global Law School), Eric Helland (Claremont McKenna College), and Jonathan Klick (University of Pennsylvania). According to the Journal Citation Reports, the journal has a 2016 impact factor of 0.570.

In 2021 the journal's peer review process was called into question following an article by John Mark Ramseyer in which the author was accused of drawing from nonexistent contracts and putting forward a denialist position asserting that the comfort women forced into sexual slavery under the Japanese Empire were willing prostitutes.

== Ramseyer controversy ==
In 2021, questions were raised about the International Review of Law and Economics' editorial practices following the online publication of an article by John Mark Ramseyer in which the author was accused of drawing from contracts he later admitted had never been located, construed the comfort women forced into sexual servitude under the Japanese Empire as prostitutes. Ramseyer published a response to his critics in January 2022 saying that his article had explained that it was not based on actual contracts, very few of which had probably survived the war, and describing the sources he had used. The article led to numerous scholarly petitions, the resignation of an associate editor, and was written about in The New Yorker. In an open letter signed by over one thousand economists in February 2021, the authors expressed concern that "young scholars aspiring to enter our profession will be greatly dismayed by an article published in a scholarly economics journal that denies the existence of a government-sponsored system of sexual coercion and argues that a ten-year old girl can consent to work as a sex worker." Economists and Nobel laureates Alvin Roth and Paul Milgrom took issue with Ramseyer's application of game theory, and wrote in a joint statement that the article "reminded [them] of Holocaust denial."
