= J. Mark Ramseyer =

American legal academic (born 1954)

John Mark Ramseyer (born 1954) is an American legal scholar who is the Mitsubishi Professor of Japanese Legal Studies at Harvard Law School. He is the author of over 10 books and 50 articles in scholarly journals. He is co-author of one of the leading corporations casebooks, Klein, Ramseyer & Bainbridge, Business Associations, Cases and Materials on Agency, Partnerships, LLCs, and Corporations, now in its 10th edition. In 2018 he was awarded Japan's Order of the Rising Sun, Gold Rays with Neck Ribbon in recognition of "his extensive contributions to the development of Japanese studies in the U.S. and the promotion of understanding toward Japanese society and culture."

In 2021, Ramseyer came under scrutiny for a preprint article released by the International Review of Law and Economics which argued that comfort women conscripted under Japanese imperial rule were primarily voluntary prostitutes.

== Education and career ==
The child of Mennonite missionary parents, Ramseyer lived in Kyushu's Miyazaki Prefecture, Japan through the age of 18 and is fluent in Japanese. His father was Dr. Robert Lewis Ramseyer, an anthropology PhD who founded the Hiroshima Mennonite Church and authored Mission and the Peace Witness: The Gospel and Christian Discipleship and Sharing the Gospel.

Ramseyer received a B.A. in history in 1976 from Goshen College, then earned a M.A. in Japanese studies from the University of Michigan in 1978 and a J.D. from Harvard Law School in 1982.

After clerking for Judge Stephen Breyer of the United States Court of Appeals for the First Circuit, Ramseyer practiced law at Chicago's Sidley & Austin. After teaching law at UCLA from 1986 to 1992, he moved first to the University Chicago School of Law and then, in 1998, to Harvard. He has also taught at several Japanese universities including the University of Tokyo, Hitotsubashi University, and Tohoku University.

== Academic controversies ==
=== 1923 massacre of Koreans ===
In 2019, a book chapter written by Ramseyer titled "Privatizing Police: Japanese Police, the Korean Massacre, and Private Security Firms" was accepted for publication in the forthcoming Cambridge Handbook on Privatization.

In the original draft of the chapter, Ramseyer relied on contemporary Japanese-language newspaper accounts. He first reiterated claims made in the newspapers, writing that Koreans "poisoned water supplies, they murdered, they pillaged, they raped". He then wrote, "The puzzle is not whether this happened. It is how extensively it happened".

Ramseyer argued that "young Koreans were a high crime group in Japan," and suggested that the massacre of Koreans at the hands of Japanese police in the chaos that followed the earthquake may have been partially justified. When scholars disputed the accuracy of these claims, the Handbook's co-editor Alon Harel asserted that the chapter would be significantly revised prior to publication, calling the disputed content "an innocent and very regrettable mistake on our part," and adding, "We assumed that Professor Ramseyer knows the history better than us. In the meantime, we have learnt a lot about the events and we sent a list of detailed comments on the paper that were written by professional historians and lawyers." Harel also said, "I genuinely regret that a misguided description of the history can be found now in the SSRN (and that we are associated with it), but I assure you that the mistake will not be repeated in the forthcoming volume." Historian Tessa Morris-Suzuki called the publication of the paper "the worst example of the failure of academic standards" she had seen in her entire career.

=== Burakumin ===
In 2019, Ramseyer published an article in the International Review of Law and Economics in which he argued that Burakumin is a "fictive identity" created in 1922. This article provoked detailed rebuttals from a number of Japanese and western scholars.

=== Comfort women ===
In 2021, controversy arose when the International Review of Law and Economics published an online pre-print of an article by Ramseyer that challenged the narrative that comfort women were coerced into sexual servitude in Japanese military brothels in the 1930s and 1940s. Ramseyer described the comfort women as prostitutes, arguing that they "chose prostitution over those alternative opportunities because they believed prostitution offered them a better outcome." In the article, Ramseyer also argues that Korean men were responsible for recruiting comfort women, and that Japanese comfort women outnumbered Korean comfort women. He also alleged that a ten-year-old Japanese girl who agreed to go to Borneo for 300 yen had consented to the work, without discussing whether a ten-year-old could adequately consent to sex.

In February, Ramseyer's Harvard colleagues in History and East Asian Studies Professors Andrew Gordon and Carter Eckert submitted a statement critical of Ramseyer's article to the International Review of Law and Economics asking that the journal delay formal publication until it had been approved by further expert peer review. Shortly after, activist and comfort woman survivor Lee Yong-soo met with Harvard students via Zoom to tell her story, recognize the disputed nature of Ramseyer's description of comfort women as "prostitutes," and call for a formal apology from Japan and from Ramseyer. Harvard Law School Professor Jeannie Suk Gersen then published an article in The New Yorker, translated into Korean and Japanese in March, describing the effects of Ramseyer's "dubious scholarship" on Japan-South Korea relations and scholars' reactions.

The Reischauer Institute of Japanese Studies at Harvard issued a statement on March 15 which questioned whether Ramseyer's article met Harvard's standards of scholarly integrity. Over a thousand economists signed a letter stating that the article misconstrued game theory and economics to give "cover to legitimize horrific atrocities," and that the "article goes well beyond mere academic failure or malpractice in its breach of academic standards, integrity, and ethics." Economists and Nobel laureates Alvin Roth and Paul Milgrom wrote that the article "reminded [them] of Holocaust denial."

In May, the Asia-Pacific Journal: Japan Focus published a special issue on comfort women including four essays by several academic historians of Japan focusing on the issues surrounding the Ramseyer article. The authors of the four articles accused Ramseyer of "serious violations of scholarly standards and methods that strike at the heart of academic integrity," including misrepresentations of Japanese sources and inaccurate citation practices. The scholars challenged the veracity of Ramseyer's research, since they did not find historical evidence of the contracts he described in his article. In addition, they checked Ramseyer's sources and found that "he cites, as supporting evidence, historical scholarship which argues the opposite of his claims," and argued that the paper should be retracted on grounds of academic misconduct. In light of these critiques, the International Review of Law and Economics issued an "Expression of Concern" regarding the validity of Ramseyer's piece, and postponed publication of the print version of the issue in question until such time as scholarly replies to Ramseyer's piece could be gathered and added to the issue for context. As of October 2022, the print version of the article had not been published and no further articles by Ramseyer have been published in the International Review of Law and Economics, although the original online preprint of Ramseyer's article, according to the journal's policies, "will remain globally available free to read whether the journal accepts or rejects the manuscript."

In April 2021, Ramseyer joined a Zoom event organized by right-wing groups in Japan, during which he called his critics "Stalinists" and alleged that their criticisms reflected a widespread anti-Japanese bias within American universities.

On 4 January 2022, Ramseyer published a response to criticisms of his original article, titled "Contracting for Sex in the Pacific War: A Response to My Critics". In the response, Ramseyer stood by the majority of his significant claims, writing "Korean women were not programmatically and forcibly conscripted by Japanese soldiers in Korea into comfort station work." Ramseyer asserted that "courageous scholars in Korea are increasingly speaking out" against the narrative that comfort women were compelled to perform their work. He also chastised his critics for criticizing the paper outside of academic settings. Of discussions on Twitter about the paper, he wrote in the response "The tweeting scholars seemed to be running a carnival."

A number of responses to Ramseyer's response were published in the following weeks.

In 2023, he authored "The Comfort Women Hoax: A Fake Memoir, North Korean Spies, and Hit Squads in the Academic Swamp" .

In 2024, he attended the third International Comfort Women Symposium.

== Selected publications ==
- J. Mark Ramseyer, Second-Best Justice: The Virtues of Japanese Private Law (2015)
- Yoshiro Miwa & J. Mark Ramseyer, The Fable of the Keiretsu: Urban Legends of the Japanese Economy (Univ. of Chi. Press 2006)
- J. Mark Ramseyer & Eric B. Rasmusen, Measuring Judicial Independence: The Political Economy of Judging in Japan (Univ. of Chi. Press 2003)
- Japanese Law: Readings in the Political Economy of Japanese Law (J. Mark Ramseyer ed., forthcoming, Routledge Revivals 2021)
- J. Mark Ramseyer, Book Review, Japanese Stud. (Oct. 23, 2020) (reviewing R.W. Kostal, Laying Down the Law: The American Legal Revolutions in Occupied Germany and Japan (2019))
- J. Mark Ramseyer, Social Capital and the Problem of Opportunistic Leadership: The Example of Koreans in Japan (John M. Olin Ctr. for L. Econ. & Bus. Discussion Paper No. 1043, Oct. 2, 2020)
- J. Mark Ramseyer, Contracting for Compassion in Japanese Buddhism (Harv. John M. Olin Ctr. Discussion Paper No. 1039, Sept. 10, 2020)
- J. Mark Ramseyer & Eric Rasmusen, Suing over Ostracism in Japan: The Informational Logic (Aug. 29, 2020)

=== Publications related to comfort women ===
- Ramseyer, J. Mark; Morgan, Jason M. (2024). The Comfort Women Hoax: A Fake Memoir, North Korean Spies, and Hit Squads in the Academic Swamp. New York: Encounter Books. ISBN 978-1-64177-346-1.
- Ramseyer, J. Mark (March 2021). "Contracting for Sex in the Pacific War". International Review of Law and Economics. 65 105971. doi:10.1016/j.irle.2020.105971.
- Ramseyer, Mark (January 12, 2021). "Recovering the Truth about the Comfort Women". Japan Forward.
- Ramseyer, J. Mark (March 2019). "Comfort Women and the Professors- Discussion Paper No. 995" (PDF). John M. Olin Center for Law, Economics, and Business, Harvard Law School.
- Ramseyer, J. Mark (1991). "Indentured Prostitution in Imperial Japan: Credible Commitments in the Commercial Sex Industry". The Journal of Law, Economics, and Organization. 7 (1). Oxford University Press: 89–116. ISSN 8756-6222. JSTOR 764879.
