= Bobby Fong =

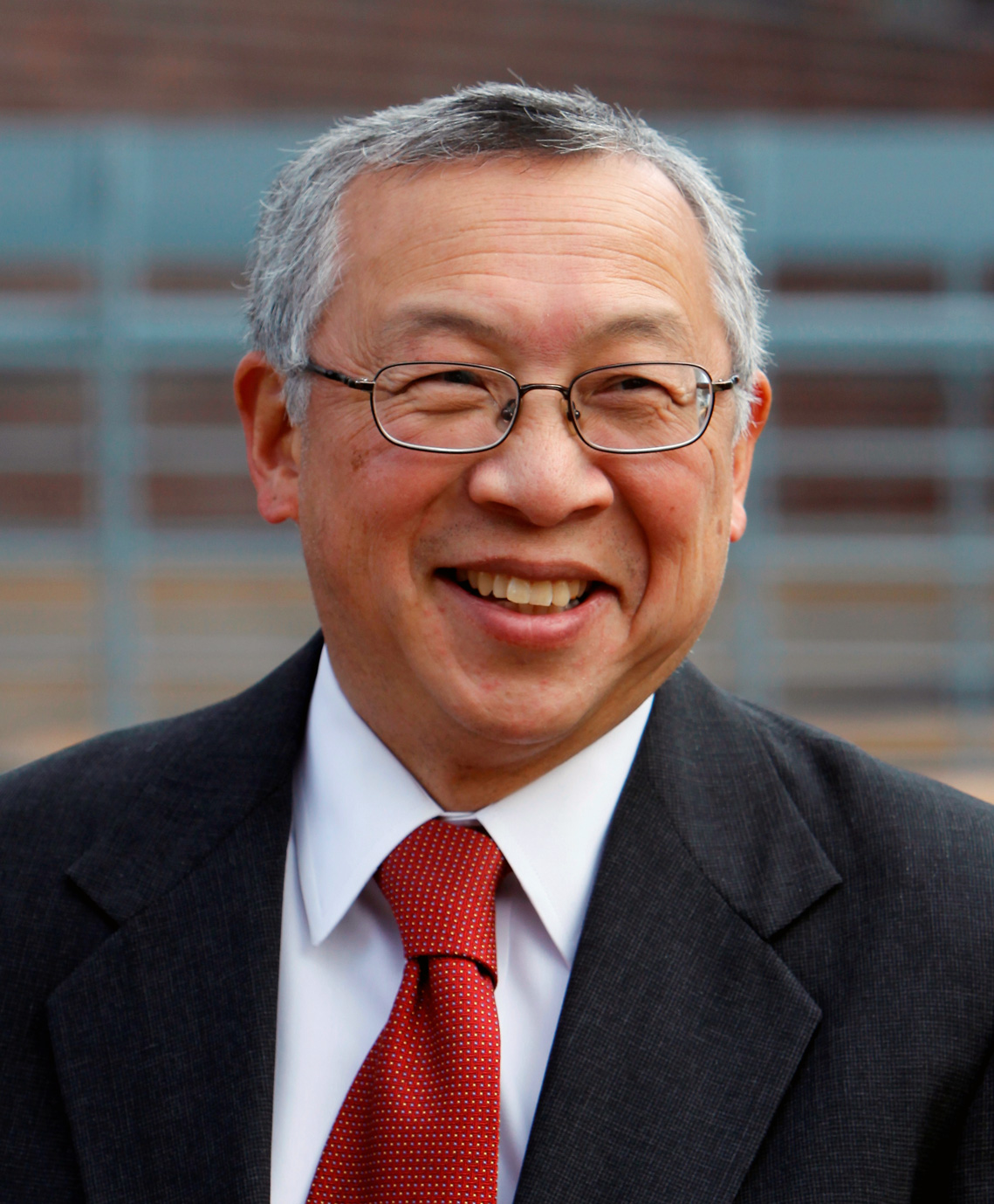
- Fong in 2013

15th President of Ursinus College
- In office July 1, 2011 – September 8, 2014
- Preceded by: John Strassburger
- Succeeded by: Terry Winegar (interim); Brock Blomberg

20th President of Butler University
- In office June 1, 2001 – June 30, 2011
- Preceded by: Geoffrey Bannister
- Succeeded by: James Danko

Personal details
- Born: 1950 Oakland, California, U.S.
- Died: September 8, 2014 (aged 64) Collegeville, Pennsylvania, U.S.
- Spouse: Suzanne Fong
- Education: Harvard University (BA); University of California, Los Angeles (PhD)

Academic background
- Thesis: The poetry of Oscar Wilde: A critical edition (1978)

Academic work
- Discipline: English Literature
- Institutions: Berea College; Hope College; Hamilton College; Butler University; Ursinus College

Bobby Fong (c. 1950 – September 8, 2014) was an American academic and the President of Ursinus College in Collegeville, Pennsylvania.

== Background ==
Fong grew up in Chinatown in Oakland, California, the son of Chinese immigrants. He graduated magna cum laude from Harvard University with a degree in English and was elected to Phi Beta Kappa. In 1978 he earned a Ph.D. in English literature from the University of California, Los Angeles, writing his dissertation on the works of Oscar Wilde.

His academic career began at Berea College. He later served as Dean of Arts and Humanities and Professor of English at Hope College in Holland, Michigan. In 1995 he became Dean of the Faculty and Professor of English at Hamilton College (New York).

== Butler University ==
On June 1, 2001, Fong became the 20th president of Butler University in Indianapolis.

In 2010, Butler's surprising run in the NCAA Men's Division I Basketball Championship tournament brought the small school and its president national attention. Butler advanced to the Final Four, beating Michigan State before losing to Duke in the championship game.

In a profile in The New York Times, Fong spoke about finding the right balance for college athletics. "We work from the presumption that there should be not a gap between academic excellence and athletic excellence," he told author William C. Rhoden. "The expectation is that you are here to be a student first." In a column for the Chronicle of Higher Education, Fong noted that "for many people, we exemplified how a university could seek a proper balance between academic seriousness and athletic excellence—and without breaking the bank."

In October, 2010, Fong announced that he would leave Butler the following summer to assume the presidency at Ursinus.

== Ursinus College ==
Fong became president of Ursinus on July 1, 2011.

In 2012, he was elected Chair of the Board of the Association of American Colleges and Universities, a national association concerned with the quality, vitality, and public standing of undergraduate liberal education.

A 2012 profile in The Philadelphia Inquirer noted that at the time, Fong was one of only 40 Asian Americans serving as college presidents in the U.S.

On September 8, 2014, Fong died suddenly of natural causes at his home in Collegeville.

Fong is credited for spearheading a strategic plan for Ursinus College that aimed to strengthen Ursinus's core curriculum in the liberal arts, while building on its recognition domestically and abroad. One of his highest priorities as president also included planning a new Innovation and Discovery center, a building that will connect the current two science buildings on campus, and which will provide a space that will foster the continued growth and connectivity of the sciences across interdisciplinary fields.

== Awards ==
In 2011 Fong received the President's Awards from National Association of Student Personnel Administrators for his efforts to advance the quality of student life at Butler and throughout higher education.

== See also ==
- Ursinus College
