= Eric Helland =

American economist

Eric Helland (born c. 1968) is the William F. Podlich Professor of Economics in Robert Day School of Economics and Finance at Claremont McKenna College and Claremont Graduate University, George R. Roberts Fellow at Claremont McKenna College, and Senior Economist, Institute for Civil Justice, RAND Corporation, Santa Monica, CA.

Helland holds a B.A. (1991) from the University of Missouri and an M.A (1992) and Ph.D. in economics from Washington University in St. Louis (1995). Helland is a member of the Board of Directors of the UCLA Center for Governance. He is the recipient of the Robert H. Durr Award from the Midwest Political Science Association and the Dean's Teaching Award from Ball State University. He has been Senior Economist at the Council of Economic Advisors and visiting professor of economics at the Stigler Center for the Study of the Economy and the State at the University of Chicago. From 2003 to 2004 he worked as the Senior Staff Economist on the Council of Economic Advisers.

He holds professional associations with American Economic Association, Society for Empirical Legal Studies, and the American Law and Economics Association. He is an editor-in-chief of the International Review of Law and Economics. His articles have appeared in such scholarly journal as the Journal of Environmental Economics and Management, Journal of Legal Studies, and Review of Economics and Statistics.

== Selected works ==
- Helland, Eric; Raviv, Yaron (2008). "The optimal jury size when jury deliberation follows a random walk". Public Choice. 134 (3–4): 255–262. doi:10.1007/s11127-007-9222-5. S2CID 18075448.
- Helland, Eric; Klick, Jonathan (2007). "The Tradeoffs between Regulation and Litigation: Evidence from Insurance Class Actions". Journal of Tort Law. 1 (3). doi:10.2202/1932-9148.1050. S2CID 2095677.
- "Court Congestion as an Explanation for Rising Attorney Fees" (with Jonathan Klick, Journal of Legal Studies 36(1):1-17, 2007)
- Brown, William O.; Helland, Eric; Smith, Janet Kiholm (2006). "Corporate philanthropic practices". Journal of Corporate Finance. 12 (5): 855–877. doi:10.1016/j.jcorpfin.2006.02.001. hdl:10419/31432.
- Helland, Eric (2006). "Reputational Penalties and the Merits of Class-Action Securities Litigation". The Journal of Law and Economics. 49 (2): 365–395. doi:10.1086/505371. S2CID 154472632.
- Helland, Eric; Klick, Jonathan; Tabarrok, Alexander (2005). "Data Watch: Tort-uring the Data". Journal of Economic Perspectives. 19 (2): 207–220. doi:10.1257/0895330054048669.
- Helland, Eric; Tabarrok, Alexander (2004). "The Fugitive: Evidence on Public versus Private Law Enforcement from Bail Jumping". The Journal of Law and Economics. 47: 93–122. doi:10.1086/378694. S2CID 10321131.
- Helland, Eric; Sykuta, Michael (2004). "Regulation and the Evolution of Corporate Boards: Monitoring, Advising, or Window Dressing?". The Journal of Law and Economics. 47: 167–193. doi:10.1086/380473. hdl:10355/8921. S2CID 222327147.
