= Francesco Parisi (economist) =

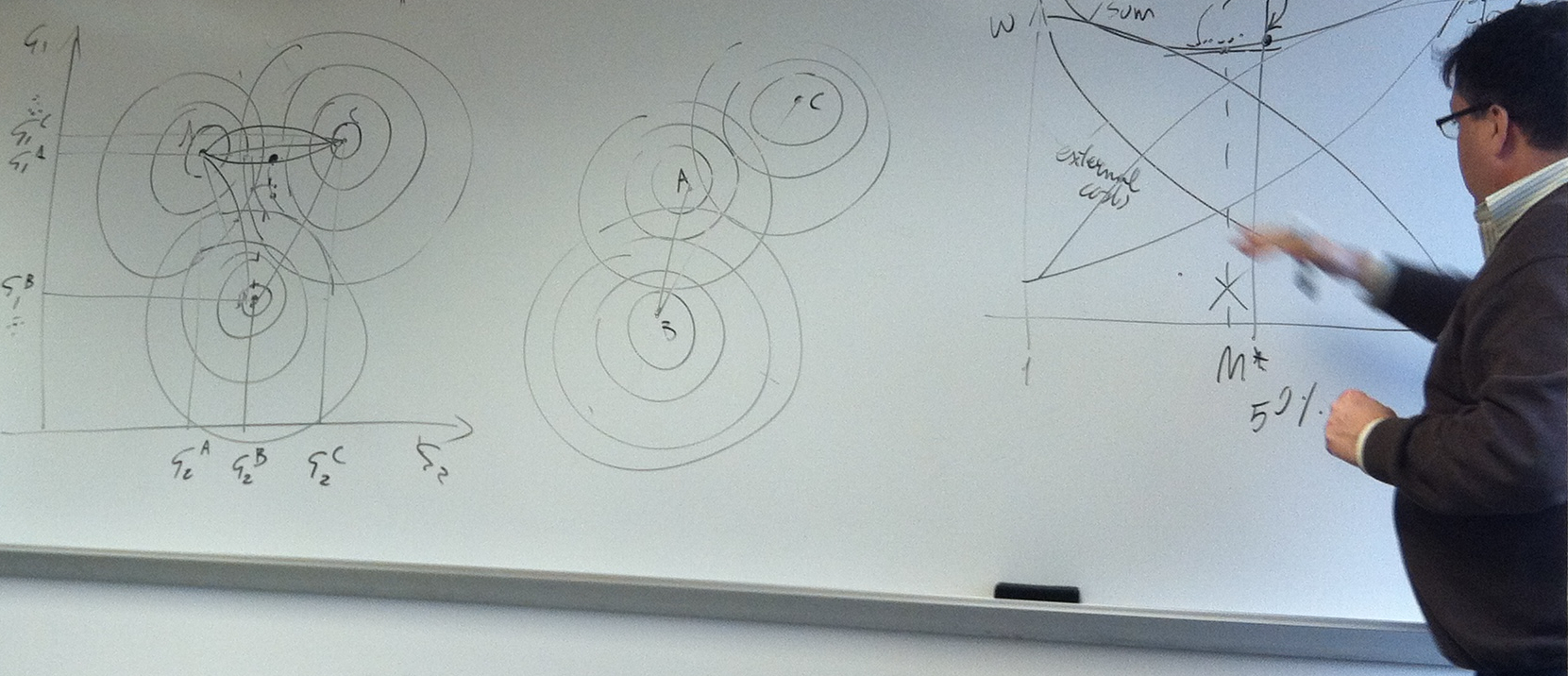
- Born: May 31, 1962 (age 64); Rome, Italy
- Education: University of Rome; University of California, Berkeley; George Mason University
- Known for: The Language of Law and Economics (2013, ISBN 9780521697712).
- Scientific career
- Fields: Law and Economics, Game theory, Public Choice, Property Law, Tort Law, Contract Law, International Law
- Workplaces: University of Minnesota; University of Bologna
- Notable students: Jonathan Klick

Francesco Parisi (born May 31, 1962) is an Italian legal scholar and economist, working primarily in the United States and Italy. He is the Oppenheimer Wolff & Donnelly Professor of Law at the University of Minnesota Law School and a Distinguished Professor of Economics at the University of Bologna. Parisi specializes in the economic analysis of law, and has authored or edited over twenty books and more than 250 scholarly works in this field. In 2018, he received the European Association of Law and Economics’ Lifetime Achievement Award for his contributions to the field of law and economics.

== Education ==
Parisi was born in Rome, Italy, and earned a law degree (Dottore in Giurisprudenza) from the University of Rome “La Sapienza” in 1985. He moved to the United States as a Fulbright Scholar and obtained an LL.M. (1988) and a J.S.D. (1990) from the University of California, Berkeley. He later completed a Master of Arts in Economics at Berkeley and a Ph.D. in Economics from George Mason University, awarded in 1998.

== Career ==
Parisi began his academic career in the early 1990s. He taught at the University of California, Berkeley (1990–1991), and the Louisiana State University Law Center (1991–1993). In 1993, he joined the faculty at George Mason University School of Law, where he remained until 2006. He served as Professor of Law and Director of the Law and Economics Program, and as Associate Director of the J.M. Buchanan Center for Political Economy. From 2002 to 2006, he concurrently held a distinguished chair in Private Law at the University of Milan.

In 2006, he joined the University of Minnesota Law School and became the Oppenheimer Wolff & Donnelly Professor in 2008. He has also served as Distinguished Professor of Economics at the University of Bologna since 2006.

He was a founding member of the American Law and Economics Association and the Italian Society for Law and Economics, serving on the boards of both. He served as editor-in-chief of the Supreme Court Economic Review (2002–2008), and has been the founding editor-in-chief of the Review of Law and Economics since 2004. Parisi co-edits the book series Economic Approaches to Law with Richard A. Posner and was the general editor of the Oxford Handbook of Law and Economics (2017).

== Research ==
Parisi has written extensively on private law subjects such as contracts, torts, and property, as well as international law, legal history, and behavioral law and economics. His work frequently employs formal models and game theory to analyze legal rules. Commentators have noted his ability to combine rigorous economic modeling with knowledge of legal doctrine and comparative law.

== Awards and honors ==
- EALE Lifetime Achievement Award, 2018
- Garvin Prize in Law and Economics, UC Berkeley (2004)
- Microsoft Research Prize, ALACDE (2009)
- Nominator, Nobel Prize in Economics (2004–)

== Selected publications ==
- Law and Economics (3 vols., Edward Elgar, 1997), ed. with Richard A. Posner
- The Law and Economics of Irrational Behavior (Stanford UP, 2005), ed. with Vernon L. Smith
- The Economics of Lawmaking (Oxford UP, 2009), with Vincy Fon
- The Language of Law and Economics (Cambridge UP, 2013)
- The Italian Legal System (2nd ed., Stanford UP, 2015), with P.G. Monateri and M.A. Livingston
- The Oxford Handbook of Law and Economics (3 vols., Oxford UP, 2017), editor
