= Robyn E. Hannigan =

American academic

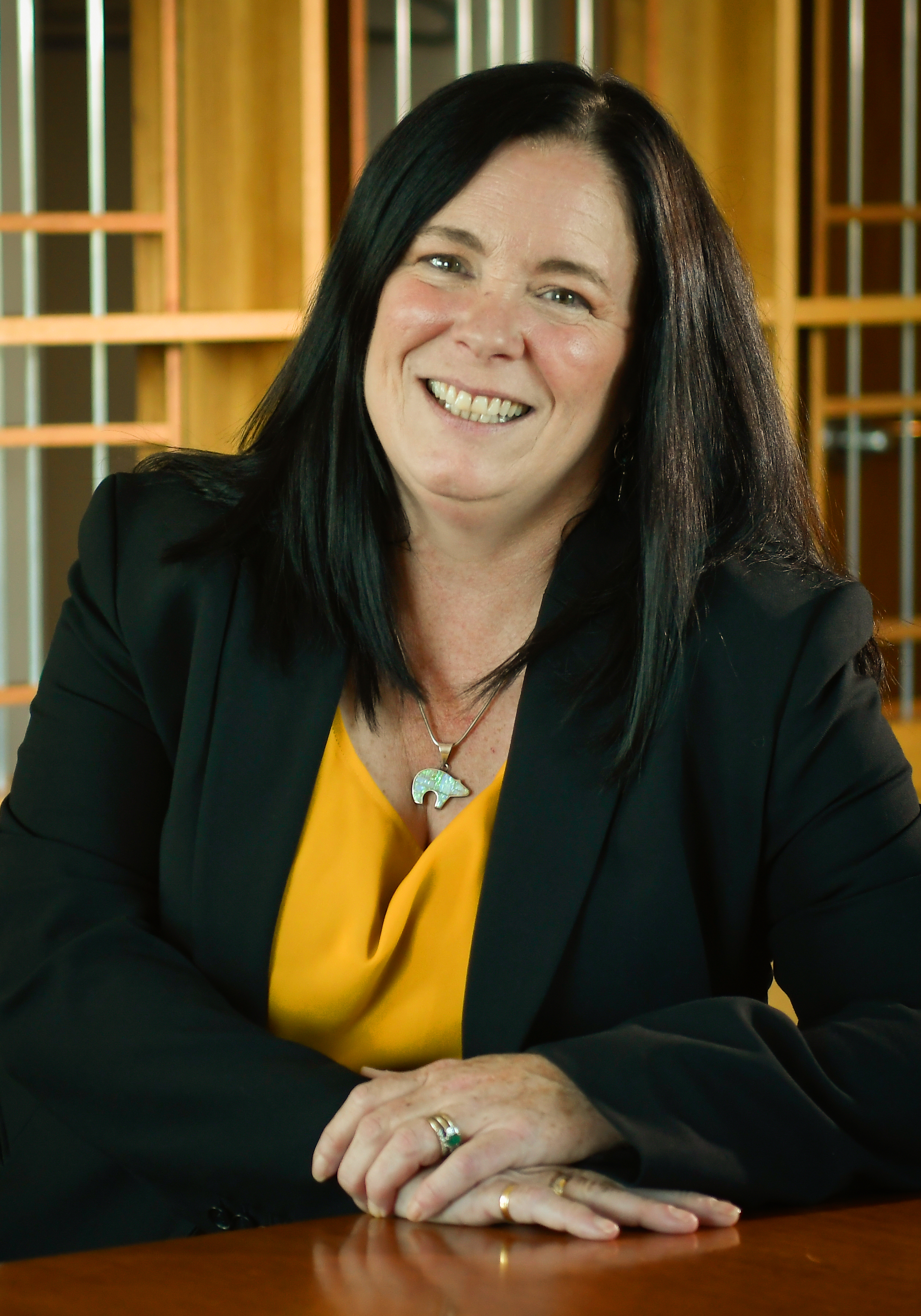
- Hannigan in 2019

19th President of Ursinus College
- In office July 1, 2022 – October 23, 2025
- Preceded by: Brock Blomberg
- Succeeded by: Gundolf Graml
- Scientific career
- Education: University of Rochester; SUNY Buffalo; The College of New Jersey
- Fields: Earth Science; Environmental Science; Geology; Biology
- Workplaces: Ursinus College; Clarkson University; University of Massachusetts Boston; National Science Foundation; Arkansas State University
- Thesis: Trace and major elements in sedimentary and igneous processes: REE geochemistry of black shales and MORB and major element chemical variations in plume-generated basalts (1997)
- Doctoral advisor: Asish Basu

Robyn Ellen Hannigan is an American academic in the field of science, and an inventor and entrepreneur. She was the 19th president of Ursinus College in Collegeville, Pa., having previously served as the provost of Clarkson University. Hannigan served in the role of president until October 2025.

Hannigan and her colleagues have developed four patents and technologies, including one which resolved an analytical chemistry instrument communication issue, and another which was a medical application technology.

== Early life ==
Hannigan grew up in New Jersey. Her mother was a member of the Narragansett Nation. As a young person, she was an enthusiastic but unsuccessful science student, receiving a D grade in her biology class. Her parents insisted that she attend college, and she obtained a Bachelor of Science degree in biology from The College of New Jersey, despite being a reluctant student. After working for her local health department after graduation, she found that she wanted to pursue higher education.

She went on to receive Master of Arts in geology from SUNY Buffalo, and a Master of Science and Ph.D. in Earth and Environmental Sciences from the University of Rochester.

== Career ==
Hannigan's previous positions include Founding Dean, School for the Environment, University of Massachusetts Boston; Program Officer, Division of Biological Infrastructure, National Science Foundation; Graduate Program Director, Environmental Science Graduate Program, Arkansas State University; Co-founder and Chief Science Officer, GeoMed Analytical, Boston, Mass.; and co-founder and Chief Science Officer, Hyphenated Solutions, State University Arkansas. She has also held faculty appointments as a professor at the University of Massachusetts Boston and Arkansas State University.

Hannigan is the co-inventor of four patents: Peltier-cooled cryogenic laser ablation cell, Detection of a component of interest with an ultraviolet laser and method of using the same, Oral fluid assays for the detection of heavy metal exposure, and Universal transfer apparatus and method to use same.

Hannigan worked as the provost at Clarkson University until July 2022, when she was hired as the president of her alma mater, Ursinus College. In April 2026, Hannigan was abruptly removed from her position in a decision that was "made in the best interests of the college's long-term success", according to a statement made by Ursinus.

=== Awards ===
Hannigan is a Fellow of the American Association for the Advancement of Science (2010), a Fellow of the Geological Society of America (2008), a recipient of the Camille and Henry Dreyfus Award for Encouraging Disadvantaged Students into Careers in the Chemical Sciences from the American Chemical Society (2007), and a Fellow of the Aldo Leopold Leadership Program (2001).
