= Robert Day School =

Economics school at Claremont McKenna College

The Robert Day School of Economics and Finance
- Motto: Crescit cum commercio civitas
- Type: Private
- Established: 2007
- Affiliations: Claremont McKenna College Claremont Colleges
- Endowment: $200 million
- Faculty: 30
- Location: Claremont, California, USA
- Nickname: RDS
- Website: www.cmc.edu/rdschool/

The Robert Day School of Economics and Finance (RDS) at Claremont McKenna College is an economics school, and the only graduate program at Claremont McKenna College. The Robert Day School emphasizes coursework that blends theory and practice. The undergraduate programs offer majors in economics and economics-accounting, and a sequence in financial economics. RDS also offers a specialized full-time master's degree in finance as well as administering the Robert Day Scholars Program. In contrast to any other liberal arts college, the offerings include a broad spectrum of core and elective courses in finance and accounting. The course is designed to develop the individual student's analytical, quantitative, and communication skills.

The establishment of the program was controversial, with several professors sending a letter to CMC president Pamela Gann saying they were concerned that the gift would "distort the college into a single focus trade school."

== History ==
In 2007, the founder and Chairman of Trust Company of the West and Trustee and former Chairman of the Board of Trustees of Claremont McKenna College, Robert A. Day (’65), made a $200 million individual gift, the largest donation ever made to a liberal arts college at the time, to Claremont McKenna College for the purpose of creating a one-year graduate program that would emphasize finance, accounting, organizational behavior and leadership as well as a scholarship for seniors at the Claremont Colleges. While both programs share the same name, the master's program is an addition, rather than a change, to the established undergraduate program which offers majors in both economics and economics-accounting as well as a financial economics sequence that students can earn in addition to any major. The master's program accepted the first students, 20 members of the class of 2010, in the beginning of 2009.

== Academic programs ==
=== Undergraduate programs ===
At the undergraduate level, the Robert Day School offers a broad array of coursework in economics, finance, and accounting. The undergraduate majors build of theoretical foundations of microeconomics and macroeconomics, and stress applications of theory to a variety of topics, as reflected in over 40 upper-level courses. Many students choose to double major in subjects such as mathematics, psychology, or history. Another popular option is to augment the major with a sequence. Students may participate in research with faculty, sponsored by the various research institutes on campus, and all students conduct their own research with a faculty advisor that culminates in a thesis in their respective major, which is a requirement for graduation.

=== Graduate program ===
The school offers undergraduates a one-year master's degree in finance. The program consists of a combination of coursework and co-curricular activities. The graduate curriculum is a set of courses in financial economics that leads to a Master of Arts in Finance.

Historically, there are between 20 and 25 students pursuing the master's degree in finance through the one-year program. Following graduation, students have continued on to get their PhDs or to work at firms in investment banking, private wealth management, and others.

=== Robert Day Scholars Program ===
The Robert Day Scholars Program is a fellowship program for both undergraduate and graduate students who pursue coursework combining economics, accounting, finance and leadership studies. The Scholars program provides merit-based tuition scholarships to approximately 20 undergraduates and 25 graduate students per year. This program prepares students for leadership roles in business, finance, government, and non-profit organizations. The Robert Day Scholars are also provided with a co-curricular program of leadership development workshops, which are designed to develop students’ understanding of the importance of a strong ethical foundation in decision-making settings as well as to broaden their skill sets in areas regarding leadership and communications.

== Faculty ==
The Robert Day School's faculty has 30 full-time tenured or tenure-track faculty members in residence. Faculty offer courses in the primary fields of economics. Notable faculty members include William Ascher, Brock Blomberg, and Eric Helland. Since its founding, the Robert Day School has appointed two deans, Janet Smith (2007–2010) and Brock Blomberg (2010–present).

== Research institutes ==
Claremont McKenna College has ten research institutes that serve to enrich the curriculum and provide research opportunities for students working closely with faculty scholars. Institutes of particular relevance to the Robert Day School include the Financial Economics Institute and the Lowe Institute of Political Economy.

The Financial Economics Institute (FEI) administers a unique curricular program, the financial economics sequence, which is distinguished both by its liberal arts emphasis and quantitative orientation. FEI provides databases and other resources to support faculty and student research. Each year, the FEI sponsors a trip that allows Claremont McKenna College students to visit some of the leading financial institutions in New York City.

The Lowe Institute supports individual faculty research covering a broad range of topics in political economy. The Institute sponsors a scholars program for independent student research, brings speakers to campus, as well as sponsors workshops and conferences. Research results are published in professional journals.
