= Brock Blomberg =

American macroeconomist

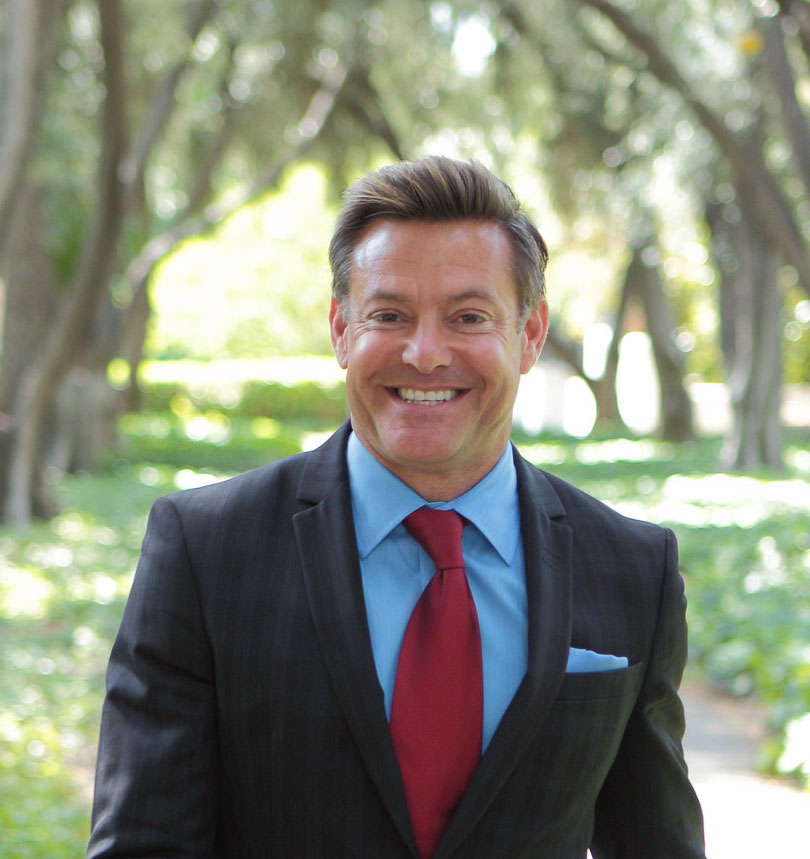
- Blomberg in 2015

8th President of California Institute of Integral Studies
- Incumbent
- Assumed office September 1, 2021
- Preceded by: Judie Wexler;

17th President of Ursinus College
- In office June 1, 2015 – August 31, 2021
- Preceded by: Bobby Fong
- Succeeded by: Robyn E. Hannigan

Personal details
- Born: March 21, 1967 (age 59) El Paso, Texas, U.S.
- Education: University of Tampa (BS); Johns Hopkins University (MA, PhD)
- Website: www.ciis.edu/presidents-office

Academic background
- Thesis: Essays in political economy: A macroeconomic and econometric approach (1995)
- Doctoral advisor: Louis Maccini

Academic work
- Discipline: Economics
- Institutions: Wellesley College; Claremont McKenna College; Ursinus College; California Institute of Integral Studies

Stephen Brock Blomberg (born March 21, 1967) is the 8th president of California Institute of Integral Studies. An internationally known scholar and former President of Ursinus College, Blomberg is best known in academia for his work on the economics of terrorism.

== Early life and career ==
Blomberg was born in El Paso, Texas, the son of an Army officer. He graduated from the University of Tampa magna cum laude with a Bachelor of Science, then received his Master of Arts and Doctor of Philosophy degrees in economics from Johns Hopkins University. From 1995 to 2003, Blomberg served on the economics faculty of Wellesley College. In fall 2003, he joined the economics department at Claremont McKenna College, and in June 2010, he became the Dean of the Robert Day School of Economics and Finance at Claremont McKenna.

== President of Ursinus College ==
Blomberg served as president of Ursinus College from 2015 to 2021. Under his stewardship, the college raised more than $107 million in gifts from a single comprehensive campaign and completed a $29 million Innovation and Discovery Center with two award-winning venues. He also lead the institution through its first campus master plan in nearly a generation and launched the college's Institute for Inclusion and Equity to coordinate programming and dialogue around diversity and social justice. A number of controversies arose during Blomberg's tenure as president of Ursinus. In April, 2016, Terry Winegar, who had served as interim president prior to Blomberg's appointment, was fired from his position as dean of the college. Winegar then sued Blomberg and Ursinus, claiming age discrimination. Winegar alleged a pattern of firing employees nearing retirement age. In September, 2016, offensive tweets by board chairman Michael Marcon were circulated on campus, but Blomberg claimed the board supported Marcon's leadership. Marcon subsequently resigned from his position. In 2017, Blomberg approached journalist Juan Williams about being Ursinus's commencement speaker. When faculty members learned about this, many opposed the selection, citing accusations of plagiarism and sexual harassment against Williams. Blomberg denied that a formal invitation was made, and Williams was removed from consideration.

== President of California Institute of Integral Studies ==
On September 1, 2021, Blomberg was named the president of California Institute for Integral Studies (CIIS). He engaged the university community in articulating a vision for CIIS’ future through a strategic planning effort, which includes new branding and state-of-the-art website, overhauling institutional systems and structures, elevating the Office of Diversity, Equity, and Inclusion to its own division, and developing a university endowment.

== Publications ==
President Blomberg has published over 30 articles and book chapters in top economics journals such as the American Economic Review, Journal of Econometrics, Journal of Law and Economics, Journal of Monetary Economics, Journal of International Economics, Journal of Public Economics, and the Review of Economics and Statistics. His research shows that terrorism has a statistically significant impact on the economy and that trade is particularly sensitive to attacks.

== Select works ==
- Engel, Rozlyn C.; Blomberg, S. Brock (1 January 2008). "Lines in the Sand: Border Effects, Economic Integration and Disintegration of Post-War Iraq". Journal of Law and Economics. doi:10.2139/ssrn.1284044. S2CID 152895792.
- Blomberg, S. Brock; Gaibulloev, Khusrav; Sandler, Todd (11 October 2011). "Terrorist group survival: ideology, tactics, and base of operations". Public Choice. 149 (3–4): 441–463. doi:10.1007/s11127-011-9837-4. S2CID 16694081.
- Blomberg, S. Brock; Hess, Gregory D.; Raviv, Yaron (18 June 2009). "Where have all the heroes gone? A rational-choice perspective on heroism". Public Choice. 141 (3–4): 509–522. doi:10.1007/s11127-009-9467-2. S2CID 145253226.
- Blomberg, S. Brock; Hess, Gregory D (November 2006). "How Much Does Violence Tax Trade?". Review of Economics and Statistics. 88 (4): 599–612. doi:10.1162/rest.88.4.599. hdl:10419/18861. S2CID 15866513.
- Blomberg, S.Brock; Hess, Gregory D; Orphanides, Athanasios (July 2004). "The macroeconomic consequences of terrorism" (PDF). Journal of Monetary Economics. 51 (5): 1007–1032. doi:10.1016/j.jmoneco.2004.04.001. S2CID 153863696.
- Asea, Patrick; Blomberg, S. Brock (March 1997). Lending Cycles (PDF) (Report). National Bureau of Economic Research. doi:10.3386/w5951.
- Blomberg, S.Brock; Hess, Gregory D. (August 1997). "Politics and exchange rate forecasts". Journal of International Economics. 43 (1–2): 189–205. doi:10.1016/s0022-1996(96)01466-3.
