= Jonathan Klick =

American economist (born 1975)

- Born: 1975 (age 50–51)
- Education: George Mason University, University of Maryland, College Park, Villanova University
- Occupations: Professor, Scholar
- Employer(s): University of Pennsylvania Law School, RAND Corporation
- Known for: Law and economics

Jonathan Klick (born 1975) is an American economist who has written numerous works on empirical law and economics. His scholarship addresses tort liability and moral hazard, criminal punishment, health regulation, and business regulation. He is a professor of law at University of Pennsylvania Law School and previously served on the faculty at Florida State University College of Law. He is an editor-in-chief of the International Review of Law and Economics.

Professor Klick holds a J.D. and Ph.D. from George Mason University. Since 2007, he has been a senior economist at the RAND Corporation.
