= R. v Broyles =

Leading case of the Supreme Court of Canada

R v Broyles, [1991] 3 SCR 595 is a leading case of the Supreme Court of Canada on the use of police agents to elicit confessions from suspects.

Emerson Raymond Broyles was a 16-year-old who was alleged to have murdered his grandmother, Lorraine Briggs, with whom he living at the time. On July 3, Briggs' decomposing body was found under the stairwell, wrapped in garbage bags. The victim had been strangled. Broyles hand-print was on one of the bags. In the course of the investigation into the death of Briggs, the police asked Todd Ritter to wear a body pack recording device and to speak to Broyles during which inculpatory statements were made.

The question for the court was whether the statements made to Ritter violated the accused right to silence.

The court found that Ritter was a state agent and therefore violated Broyles right to silence.

== See also ==
- List of Supreme Court of Canada cases (Lamer Court)
