= Villanova School of Business =

Business school of Villanova University in Villanova, Pennsylvania

Coordinates: 40.037029°N 75.343316°W

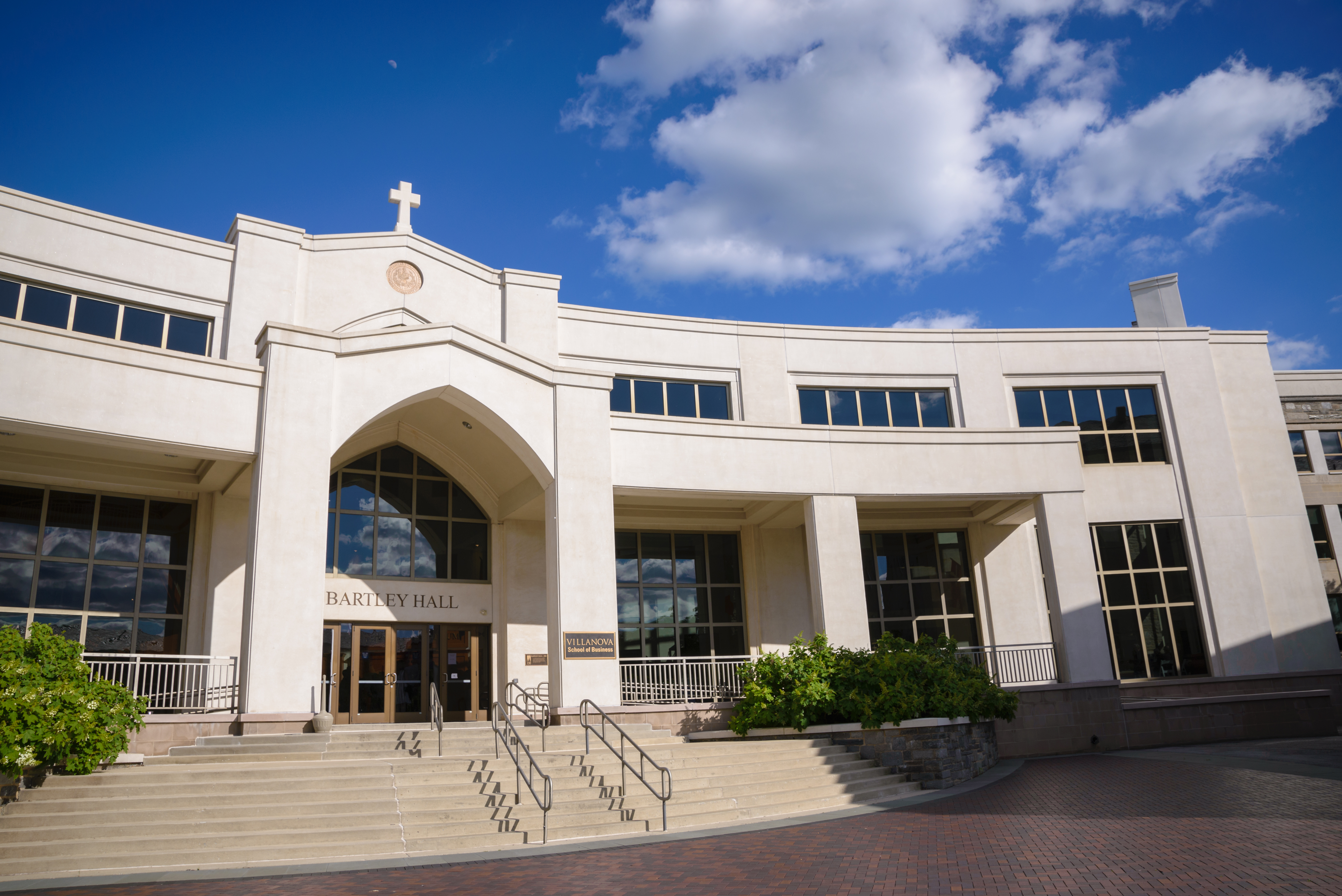
- Bartley Hall, home of VSB
- Type: Business school
- Established: 1922; 104 years ago
- Parent institution: Villanova University
- Dean: Wen Mao
- Undergraduates: 1,674 (2023)
- Location: Villanova, Pennsylvania, United States
- Website: www.villanova.edu/business

The Villanova School of Business is an American business school that is part of Villanova University, a private Catholic research university in Villanova, Pennsylvania, United States. It offers seven undergraduate degrees, six graduate programs, an executive MBA program, and several executive education programs. The programs are accredited by the Association to Advance Collegiate Schools of Business (AACSB).

== History ==
Villanova University was founded in 1842 and named after St. Thomas of Villanova, a 16th-century Augustinian saint, writer, educator, and bishop. In the early 1900s, there was a trend to specialize collegiate studies in specific fields. The Villanova School of Business, then called The Division of Commerce and Finance, was founded by Joseph C. Bartley in 1922. The school was later renamed The Villanova School of Business in 2006.

Since 1922, VSB has had nine deans:

- Joseph Bartley: 1922–1962
- Phillip F. Barrett: 1962–1976
- Alvin A. Clay: 1977–1995
- John A. Pearce II: 1995–1996
- Tim Monahan: 1996–2003
- James M. Danko: 2005–2011
- Patrick G. Maggitti: 2012–2015
- Joyce E. A. Russell: 2016–2023
- Wen Mao: 2023–present

== Rankings ==
=== Graduate ===
The MBA program was ranked:

- #19 Best Online MBA by U.S. News & World Report in 2023
- #26 Best Online MBA by Poets & Quants in 2023
- #25 Best Part-Time MBA Programs by U.S. News & World Report in 2023

VSB's specialized master's programs were ranked:

- #16 Best Online Graduate Business Degree Programs by U.S. News & World Report in 2022
- #9 Best Online Masters in Business Analytics Programs by Fortune in 2023

=== Undergraduate ===
Overall, the college's undergraduate programs were ranked:

- #14 by Poets & Quants in 2023
- #1 by Bloomberg Businessweek in 2016, including rankings of #2 in its employer survey, #10 in its student survey, and #15 in its ranking of internship
- #36 for Best Undergraduate Teaching by U.S. News & World Report in as well as 2021 #64 among "Best Value Schools"

== Academics ==
The Villanova School of Business offers 7 majors, 2 co-majors and 11 minors to its undergraduate students and offers 8 graduate programs, including an executive MBA program, and specialized masters' programs.

== Campus ==
The Villanova School of Business is based in Bartley Hall, located on the main campus of Villanova University. When Villanova College became a university in 1953, it undertook an extensive building program which benefited the school of business. The new facility, now known as Bartley Hall, represented a major expansion of classrooms and laboratory facilities for business students at the university.

Bartley Hall underwent a $30M renovation in 2002, adding 65,000 square feet (6,000 m^{2}) to the building. Today, Bartley Hall includes 33 classrooms, 6 lecture halls and a 130-seat auditorium.

In addition to its classrooms, two features are The Laboratory for Advancement of Interdisciplinary Research (LAIR) and The Victoria and Justin Gmelich '90 Lab for Financial Markets. The LAIR provides a physical space for VSB faculty and students to conduct research using experiments, surveys, interviews, focus groups and other primary sources. The 1,500-square-foot (140 m^{2}) Gmelich Lab for Financial Markets replicates a Wall Street trading desk.

Bartley Hall is not only used as a learning space for students, but also as a study space and dining hall. Bartley also houses a coffee shop.
