= R v W (D) =

- Supreme Court of Canada

Hearing: February 1, 1991 Judgment: March 28, 1991
- Citations: [1991] 1 S.C.R. 742
- Docket No.: 22170
- Ruling: D.W.'s appeal dismissed

Court membership
- Chief Justice: Antonio Lamer; Puisne Justices: Bertha Wilson, Gérard La Forest, Claire L'Heureux-Dubé, John Sopinka, Charles Gonthier, Peter Cory, Beverley McLachlin, William Stevenson

Reasons given
- Majority: Cory J., joined by Gonthier and Iacobucci JJ.
- Dissent: Sopinka J.
- Dissent: McLachlin J.

R v W (D), [1991] 1 S.C.R. 742 is a leading decision of the Supreme Court of Canada on assessing guilt based on the credibility of witnesses in a criminal trial. More specifically, W.D. examines sexual assault cases and burdens of proof in evidence law.

== Background ==
DW, a 42-year-old man, was charged with sexually assaulting a 16-year-old girl, TW, on two occasions while driving her to her boyfriend's house. TW was staying at DW's house at the time.

Besides her claim of the event, there was little circumstantial evidence. Her panties had semen stains from a Type A secretor, which included DW, but also 32% of the population. The secretor type of the boyfriend was never known.

At trial before a judge and jury the defence argued that she was not credible. She was unemployed, illiterate, and a dropout, and had been kicked out of several houses including DW's house. The testimony of DW was poor, but it is uncertain whether it was due to lack of intelligence or deception.

At the end of the trial the judge issued its charge to the jury without mention of any issue of credibility. Less than ten minutes later the Crown made a request for a recharge to bring this issue up. Counsel for the Crown requested the recharge in order for the judge to explain what evidence may assist the jury in making a finding on the issue of credibility.

During the recharge, the judge charged to the jury that:

If in fact you believe the accused then clearly nothing took place and in fact the Crown will have failed to prove beyond a reasonable doubt that he is guilty as charged. On the other hand if you in fact believe the complainant totally, then he is guilty as charged.

On these instructions the jury returned a guilty verdict.

The issue of the appeal was whether "the erroneous recharge, viewed in the context of the charge as a whole and the short time that elapsed between the main charge and the recharge, could be said to have left the jury with any doubt that if they had a reasonable doubt they must acquit."

The judge erred in the short recharge in that he characterized the core issue to be determined by the jury as to whether they believed the complainant or whether they believed the appellant. The counsel for the appellant objected to the recharge, but the trial judge's response was that he did not feel that he left the jury with the impression that they must accept the appellant's evidence in order to acquit him. Thus, the appeal to the Court of Appeal was initially dismissed.

== Reasons for judgment ==
Justice Cory, for the majority, denied the appeal.

In considering the recharge, he found that the judge erred.

It is incorrect to instruct a jury in a criminal case that, in order to render a verdict, they must decide whether they believe the defence evidence or the Crown's evidence. Putting this either/or proposition to the jury excludes the third alternative. Namely, that the jury, without believing the accused, after considering the accused's evidence in the context of the evidence as a whole, may still have a reasonable doubt as to his guilt.

Cory describes the correct method of assessing credibility as follows at p. 310:

Ideally, appropriate instructions on the issue of credibility should be given, not only during the main charge, but on any recharge. A trial judge might well instruct the jury on the question of credibility along these lines:

First, if you believe the evidence of the accused, obviously you must acquit.

Second, if you do not believe the testimony of the accused but you are left in reasonable doubt by it, you must acquit.

Third, even if you are not left in doubt by the evidence of the accused, you must ask yourself whether, on the basis of the evidence which you do accept, you are convinced beyond a reasonable doubt by that evidence of the guilt of the accused.

Nevertheless, on examining the circumstances of the error as a whole, Justice Cory believed that the jury had been properly instructed and the error was not sufficient to bring about an acquittal.

== Comments ==
In a similar case, R v. S (WD) [1994] 3 S.C.R. 521, it was reiterated that it is erroneous to direct a jury that they must accept the Crown's evidence or that of the defense. Again, to put forth such an either/or approach excludes the very real and legitimate possibility that the jury may not be able to select one version in preference to the other, and yet, on a whole of the evidence, be left with a reasonable doubt. The effect of putting such a position to the jury is to shift the burden to the accused of demonstrating his presumption of innocence, since the jury might believe that the accused could not be acquitted unless the defence evidence was believed. It is evident that the trial judge erred in the case of W.D., making error in recharge as to the standard of proof required of the Crown. The Court examined whether the error was reversible in light of the correct instructions that had been given to the jury minutes prior to the recharge during the main charge. In other words, the trial judge's error of putting such an either/or proposition to the jury causes the exclusion of a third alternative: that the jury, without believing the accused, after considering the accused's evidence in the context of the evidence as a whole, may still have reasonable doubt as to his guilt.

Where an error has been made in the instruction of jury members on the burden of proof in a criminal case, the fact that the trial judge correctly instructed the jury on that issue elsewhere in the charge is a strong indication that the jury were not in fact left in doubt as to the burden resting on the Crown.

As Sopinka J. dissented, credibility is a fundamental issue. When dealing with the burden of proof, the trial judge is dealing with the most fundamental rule of the legal game. It is especially important that it be very clear and unequivocal that the prosecution has not proved its case beyond a reasonable doubt if, after considering the evidence of the accused and the complainant together with any other evidence, there is a doubt. The charge absolutely did not make this clear to the jury.

Justice Sopinka noted that the jury were told two things which were in conflict. First, the main charge, in dealing with the credibility of the accused, the Crown could fail to prove their case beyond a reasonable doubt even if the jury had a doubt about the credibility of the accused's story. Then, on the recharge, the Crown would have failed to discharge its onus only if they believed the evidence of the accused. The jury would be uncertain as to which version was correct and it's pure speculation that they would have accepted the first version rather than the second one, which was characterized by the trial judge as "better". This takes on additional significance in light of the statement to the jury that the charge might contain errors that would necessitate a recharge.

== See also ==
- List of Supreme Court of Canada cases
