= Sopinka Cup =

- Formation: 1999
- Location: Canada

The Sopinka Cup is an annual trial advocacy competition in Canada organized by The Advocates' Society and sponsored by the American College of Trial Lawyers. This two-day event is aimed to encourage law schools to train students in the art of oral advocacy. Elimination occurs in four regional competitions across Canada, leaving eight law schools to represent various geographical areas of Canada and compete in the bilingual National Finals hosted in Ottawa. Universities in the western provinces (British Columbia, Alberta, Saskatchewan and Manitoba) compete in the MacIntyre Cup. Universities in Ontario compete in the Arnup Cup. Both are mock trial advocacy competitions. Universities in Quebec compete in the Guy Guérin Cup. Universities in the eastern provinces (New Brunswick and Nova Scotia) compete in the McKelvey Cup.

The Sopinka Cup was established in 1999 to honour the late Supreme Court of Canada Justice John Sopinka, who was a long time Fellow of the American College of Trial Lawyers.

== Past winners ==
- 2021: Jade Barrière and Ingrid Mavoli from University of Ottawa Faculty of Law (Civil law team)
- 2019: Nathan Wells and Olivia Whynot from University of British Columbia Faculty of Law
- 2018: Kelsey Angeley and Dominique Verdurmen from McGill University
- 2017: Anita Yuk, Zachary Carter, Brady Knight and Sarah Loewen from University of Saskatchewan College of Law (Best Overall Advocate: Lisa Delaney, Dalhousie University)
- 2016: Jonathon Austin and Fraser Genuis from University of Alberta (Best Overall Advocate: Caroline Humphrey, Université de Moncton)
- 2015: Fraser Dickson and Dov Whitman from McGill University (Best Overall Advocate: Noémie Doiron, Université de Moncton)
- 2014: Reem Zaia and Sarah Sullivan from University of Ottawa Faculty of Law (Best Overall Advocate: Reem Zaia, University of Ottawa)
- 2013: Suzanne Kittell and Michele Charles from Dalhousie University (Best Overall Advocate: Marie-Pier Emery-Rochette)
- 2012: Jared Epp and Lauren Ignacz from University of Saskatchewan College of Law (Best Overall Advocate: Zoë Marszewski Paliare, Queen’s University)
- 2011: Jason Demers, Evan Thompson, Kayla DeMars-Krentz and Andrew Kuzma from University of Saskatchewan College of Law (Best Overall Advocate: Evan Thompson, University of Saskatchewan College of Law)
- 2010: Renée Blanchard and Richard Deveau from L'Université de Moncton (Best Overall Advocate: Ryan LePage, University of Saskatchewan College of Law)
- 2009: Laura McPheeters and George Roper from University of British Columbia Faculty of Law
- 2008: Monika Rahman and Mareike Newhouse from McGill University Faculty of Law
- 2007: Karin McCaig and Donna Polgar from Osgoode Hall Law School
- 2006: Eric Hachinski and Lana Jackson from University of Manitoba
- 2005: Laura Marr and Krista Smith from Dalhousie University
- 2004: Anne-Marie Lacoste and Marie-Pier Michon from Université de Montréal
- 2003: Kevin Toyne and Jennifer Malabar from University of Manitoba
- 2002: Almira Esmail and Tim Livingston from University of Victoria School of Law (Best Cross-examination, Best Closing address to the Jury, and Best Advocate: Almira Esmail, University of Victoria)
- 2001: Stephen Christie and Paul Grower from University of Manitoba
- 2000: Eli Lederman and Christine Doucet from Dalhousie University
- 1999: Katherine Hilton and David Armstrong from University of Toronto

== MacIntyre Cup ==
The regional round for law schools in the western provinces is called the MacIntyre Cup.

=== Past winners ===
- 2018: Yassir Al-Naji and Ben Johnson from University of Manitoba
- 2017: Agapi Mavridis and Adriel Agpalza from University of Manitoba
- 2016: Kevin Murray and Andrew Eyer from Peter A. Allard School of Law, The University of British Columbia
- 2015: Zachary T. Courtemanche and Anthony Foderaro from University of Manitoba
- 2014: Cadeyrn Christie, Kaitlyn Chewka, and Tyler Gloux from University of Victoria Co-winners with Sean Fagan, Nathanial Day, Grace Waschuk, and Rylund Hunter from University of Saskatchewan. This was the first time in the history of the McIntyre Cup that two teams reached an exact tie based on points.
- 2013: Stephanie Frazer, Alexandra Fox, Curtis Mennie and Katherine Pintye from University of Saskatchewan
- 2012: Anna Kontsedalova and Molly Shamess from University of British Columbia
- 2011: Jason Demers, Evan Thompson, Kayla DeMars-Krentz and Andrew Kuzma from the University of Saskatchewan
- 2010: Yun Li and Melania Cannon from University of British Columbia
- 2009: University of Saskatchewan
- 2008: Ashley Syer and Thomas Moran from the University of British Columbia
- 2002: Almira Esmail and Timothy Livingston from University of Victoria
- 1999: University of Saskatchewan
- 1995: University of Saskatchewan

== WeirFoulds-Arnup Cup ==
The regional round for law schools in Ontario is called the WeirFoulds-Arnup Cup, named after Justice John Arnup. It is held in Toronto and is run by WeirFoulds LLP, where Justice Arnup practised during his career as a litigator.

=== Past winners ===
- 2025: Bahar Taherian and David Townshend from Osgoode Hall Law School
- 2022: Shannon Blaine and Alannah Safnuk from University of Toronto
- 2021: Akkila Thirukesan and Alexis Mawko from University of Ottawa
- 2020: Justis Danto-Clancy and Justin Blanco from Bora Laskin Faculty of Law
- 2019: Amanda Gallo and Nathan Wainwright from Bora Laskin Faculty of Law
- 2016: Samuel Greene and Malini Vijaykumar from University of Toronto
- 2014: Bryan Guertin and Benjamin Snow from Queen's University
- 2013: Ryann Atkins and Anna Cooper from University of Toronto
- 2012: Robert Thomson and Zoe Marszewski Paliare from Queen's University
- 2011: Dorothy Charach and Eric Pellegrino from Osgoode Hall Law School
- 2010: Mark Rieger and Joseph Heller from University of Toronto
- 2009: Amanda Mclachlan and Lauren Wilhelm from University of Windsor
- 2004: Meghan Ferguson and Ewan Lyttle from University of Ottawa
- 2002: Anna Marrison and Adriana Ametrano from University of Toronto

== Guy Guérin Cup ==
The regional round for law schools in Quebec is called the Guy Guérin Cup, named after Judge Guy Guérin (1927-1994), who was Justice (1968-1994) and then Chief Justice (1985-1988) of the Court of the Sessions of the Peace, which became the Court of Quebec, Criminal and Penal Division in 1988. The University of Ottawa has competed in this competition on occasion.

=== Past winners ===
- 2022: François Bélanger and Nicolas Besner, University of Ottawa Common Law
- 2021: Jade Barrière and Ingrid Magoli, University of Ottawa Civil Law
- 2020: Nadir Khan and Rebecca Schur, McGill University
- 2019: Audréanne Côté and Moses Otim, McGill University
- 2018: Kelsey Angeley and Dominique Verdurmen, McGill University
- 2016: Marie-Louise Chabot and Suzanne Zaccour, McGill University
- 2015: Andrée-Anne Lavoie and Sandrine Bourgon, University of Ottawa Civil Law
- 2014: Evelyn Gauvin and Christine Côté, University of Ottawa Civil Law
- 2013: Carmen Barbu and Carle Jane Evans, McGill University
- 2012: Marie-Ève Lavoie and Alexander Steinhouse, McGill University
- 2011: Katrina Peddle and Anya Kortenaar, McGill University
- 2010: Nicholas Melling and Jeannine Plamondon, McGill University
- 2009: Andrew Carvajal and Alexandre Bien-Aimé, McGill University
- 2006: Andrew Bratt and Derek Ishak, University of Ottawa

== McKelvey Cup ==
The regional round for law schools in the eastern provinces is called the McKelvey Cup, named after Neil McKelvey, Q.C.

=== Past winners ===
- 2025: Aleida Whidden and David Cruz from Dalhousie University
- 2021: Elizabeth Matheson and Anthony Buckland from Dalhousie University
- 2020: Marie-Eve Nowlan and Catherine Poirier from Université de Moncton
- 2018: Nicole Briand and Alexandre Vienneau from Université de Moncton
- 2017: Ian Wilenius and Lisa Delaney from Dalhousie University
- 2016: Ria Guidone and Mary Brown from Dalhousie University
- 2015: Noémie Doiron and Élaine Lang from Université de Moncton
- 2014: Alexis Couture and Alexandre Gibson from Université de Moncton
- 2013: Suzanne Kittell and Michele Charles from Dalhousie University
- 2012: Ludmilla Jarda et Clémence Talbot from Université de Moncton
- 2011: Sophie Rioux and Thomas Raffy from Université de Moncton
- 2010: Renée Blanchard and Richard Deveau from Université de Moncton
- 2009: Francine Ouellette and Jonathan Saumier from Université de Moncton
- 2008: Mat Brechtel and Conor Dooley from Dalhousie University
- 2007: Brian Gallant and Luc Roy from Université de Moncton
- 2006: Tammy Lamarche and Junie Saint-Fleur from Université de Moncton
- 2005: Nadia Bérubé Mélanie Trembley from Université de Moncton
- 2004: Eric Charland and Carley Parish from Université de Moncton
- 2003: Marc Bourgeois and Luc Desroches from Université de Moncton
- 2002: Jennifer Grey and Grant McKenzie from University of New Brunswick
- 2001: Lisa Taylor and Jonathoin Feasby from Dalhousie University
- 2000: Christine Doucet and Eli Lederman from Dalhousie University
- 1999: Charlotte Kanya-Forstner and Kim Von Arx from University of New Brunswick
