= List of law schools in Canada =

A number of law schools in Canada operate as a faculty or as an affiliated school to a Canadian public university. Twenty law schools offer common law schooling, whereas six schools offer schooling in the civil law system. Although the judicial system in most Canadian provinces operate under a common law system, the province of Quebec uses the civil law system for private law matters. As a result, most Canadian law schools that offer schooling in civil law are based in Quebec.

== Legal education in Canada ==
Generally, entry into law programs in Canada is based primarily on a combination of the student's previous grades as well as, for English-language common-law programs, their score on the Law School Admission Test (LSAT). Factors such as specialized degrees, work experience, community involvement, personal character, extracurricular activities, and references are sometimes taken into account, for which the Universities of Calgary, Windsor and McGill's holistic law school admissions are well known, but the LSAT remains far more determinative of admission than comparable standardized tests for other disciplines, such as the MCAT or GMAT. Quebec law schools, including the dual-curriculum, bilingual McGill University Faculty of Law, do not require applicants to write the LSAT, although any scores are generally taken into account; nor do the French-language common-law programs at the Université de Moncton École de droit and University of Ottawa Faculty of Law.

All of Canada's law schools are affiliated with public universities, and are thus public institutions. This practice has been held to have helped reduce disparities in the quality of students and instruction as between the schools. Since there is a limited number of positions in each law school's annual admissions, entry to all Canadian law schools is intensely competitive: most law schools receive far more applicants than they can accommodate. Most schools focus on their respective regions, and many graduates remain in the region in which the school is located, though the relatively uniform quality of the law schools affords greater geographic mobility to graduates.

After completing the Juris Doctor (J.D.), a Bachelor of Laws (LL.B.), or a Bachelor of Civil Law (B.C.L.), students must article for about a year (in Quebec, the six-month stage is the equivalent to articling); this can be a challenge for those with lower grades, as there are often a shortage of articling positions, and completion of articles is required to be able to practice law in Canada. Articling involves on-the-job training, at a lower introductory salary, under the supervision of a lawyer licensed by the Provincial Bar who has been practising for a minimum of 5 years. An alternative to articling, usually for the most competitive students, is to complete a Judicial Clerkship with a provincial or federal court under the direction of a judge. After ten to sixteen months of articling or clerking and call to the bar, lawyers are free to practice in their own right: many are hired by the same lawyer or firm for which they articled, while some choose to begin independent practices or accept positions with different employers. Others may leave the private practice of law to work in government or industry as a lawyer or in a law-related position. Former Judicial Law Clerks are typically not hired by the court after their clerkship.

== Schools teaching common law ==
School	Province (city)	Degree	Type	Founded
Dalhousie University, Schulich School of Law	Nova Scotia (Halifax)	J.D.	Public	1883
Lakehead University, Bora Laskin Faculty of Law	Ontario (Thunder Bay)	J.D.	Public	2013
McGill University, Faculty of Law	Quebec (Montreal)	J.D.	Public	1968
Queen's University at Kingston, Faculty of Law	Ontario (Kingston)	J.D.	Public	1957
Thompson Rivers University, Faculty of Law	British Columbia (Kamloops)	J.D.	Public	2011
Toronto Metropolitan University, Lincoln Alexander School of Law	Ontario (Toronto)	J.D.	Public	2019
University of Alberta, Faculty of Law	Alberta (Edmonton)	J.D.	Public	1912
University of British Columbia, Peter A. Allard School of Law	British Columbia (Vancouver)	J.D.	Public	1945
University of Calgary, Faculty of Law	Alberta (Calgary)	J.D.	Public	1976
University of Manitoba, Robson Hall Faculty of Law	Manitoba (Winnipeg)	J.D.	Public	1914
University of New Brunswick, Faculty of Law	New Brunswick (Fredericton)	J.D.	Public	1892
University of Ottawa, Faculty of Law	Ontario (Ottawa)	J.D.	Public	1953
University of Saskatchewan, College of Law	Saskatchewan (Saskatoon)	J.D.	Public	1912
University of Toronto, Henry N.R. Jackman Faculty of Law	Ontario (Toronto)	J.D.	Public	1949
University of Victoria, Faculty of Law	British Columbia (Victoria)	J.D.	Public	1975
University of Western Ontario, Faculty of Law	Ontario (London)	J.D.	Public	1959
University of Windsor, Faculty of Law	Ontario (Windsor)	J.D.	Public	1967
Université de Moncton, Faculté de droit	New Brunswick (Moncton)	J.D.	Public	1978
Université de Montréal, Faculté de droit	Quebec (Montreal)	J.D.	Public	2011
York University, Osgoode Hall Law School	Ontario (Toronto)	J.D.	Public	1889

The Akitsiraq Law Program offered legal education primarily in the facilities of the Nunavut Arctic College in Iqaluit, Nunavut in cooperation with another common-law school and led to a law degree from that school (the University of Victoria in 2001 and the University of Saskatchewan in 2017).

== Schools teaching civil law ==
School	Province (city)	Degree	Type	Founded
Université Laval, Faculté de droit	Québec (Quebec City)	LL.B.	Public	1852
McGill University, Faculty of Law	Québec (Montréal)	B.C.L.	Public	1848
Université de Montréal, Faculté de droit	Québec (Montréal)	LL.B.	Public	1892
Université d'Ottawa, Faculté de droit	Ontario (Ottawa)	LL.L.	Public	1953
Université du Québec à Montréal, Faculté de science politique et de droit	Québec (Montréal)	LL.B.	Public	1969
Université de Sherbrooke, Faculté de droit	Québec (Sherbrooke)	LL.B.	Public	1954

== Schools offering dual law degrees or choice of legal system ==
- Queen's University Faculty of Law
  - Queen's Law students expecting to graduate with their common law JD degree may apply by March, to the Faculty of Law at the Université de Sherbrooke for admission into the combined degree program which leads to the conferral of a civil law degree after just one academic year of study.
- York University, Osgoode Hall Law School
  - Complete an additional year at Université de Montréal, Faculty of Law to earn a B.C.L. in civil law.
- University of Ottawa, Faculty of Law
  - Complete 3 years through the Canadian Law Program (PDC Programme de droit canadien) to earn a common-law (JD) and civil (LL.L.) simultaneously. This is a single-stream program available to 20 candidates per year only. Or, through the National Program, students can complete an additional year to complement either a common- (JD) or civil-law (LL.L.) degree with the other degree. Spend two years at each of the University of Ottawa and either Michigan State University College of Law or Washington College of Law to obtain Canadian common-law and U.S. law degrees (double JD).
- McGill University, Faculty of Law
  - Complete 3, 3.5 or 4 years (at the student's option) to earn civil- (B.C.L.) and common-law (J.D.) degrees through the mandatory 'transsystemic' programme. (In 1999 this single-stream program replaced the dual-stream National Programme, in place since 1968.)
- Université de Montréal, Faculty of Law
  - Complete an additional year at Osgoode Hall Law School to earn a JD in common law. University of Montreal has its own JD program that can be taken in the third year of the LL.B. studies.
- Université de Sherbrooke, Faculty of Law
  - Complete an additional year to earn a JD in common law and transnational law
- University of Windsor, Faculty of Law
  - Complete three years to earn a Canadian common-law degree (JD) and, through the University of Detroit Mercy School of Law, a U.S. law degree (JD).
- University of Victoria, University of Victoria Faculty of Law
  - Complete four years to earn a Canadian common-law degree (JD) and an Indigenous Law Degree (JID).

== See also ==
- Higher education in Canada
- Lists of law schools
