= Royal Commission on the Toronto Jail and Custodial Services =

The Royal Commission on the Toronto Jail and Custodial Services, also known as the Shapiro Commission, was a public inquiry into the treatment of prisoners and the training of correctional officers in the province of Ontario, particularly Toronto Jail. With recommendations from the Ministry of Correctional Services, the Executive Council of Ontario presented the matter to the Chief Justice of Ontario. Chief Justice George Alexander Gale appointed Honorable Judge B. Barry Shapiro as the Commissioner in 1974 who presented its recommendations to the Lieutenant Governor of Ontario Pauline Mills McGibbon in 1978.

The commission's inquest focused on four areas of interest: Firstly, the mistreatment of inmates in particular the use of unnecessary force and physical assaults. Second, the role and functions of a Correctional Officer at the institution. Third, the service demands on the staff within the institution. Fourth, the methods of recruitment and training of the institution.

The Commission reported investigations and recommendations and that were broken down into four volumes. There were over 70 recommendations made in respects to the manner which inmates were treated and staff development.
