= John Arnup =

Canadian judge (1911–2005)

John Douglas Arnup
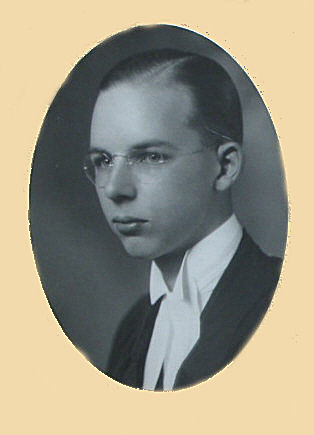
- Born: May 24, 1911; Toronto, Ontario
- Died: October 5, 2005 (aged 94); Toronto, Canada
- Occupation: Judge - Appeal for Ontario

John Douglas Arnup, OC (May 24, 1911 – October 5, 2005) was a Canadian lawyer, and a judge on the Court of Appeal for Ontario, who is best known for having pioneered universal legal aid in Ontario.

== Early life and education ==
Arnup was born in Toronto, the eldest of six children born to Jesse H. and Ella Maud (née Leeson) Arnup. His father was a Methodist minister who later became Moderator of the United Church of Canada (1944–1946).

Arnup attended Oakwood Collegiate Institute in Toronto, then attended Victoria College, University of Toronto, receiving a Bachelor of Arts degree in 1932. Interested in the law, Arnup enrolled at Osgoode Hall Law School and received a Bachelor of Laws degree in 1935.

== Litigator ==
Arnup was called to the Ontario bar in 1935, and practiced law at Mason, Foulds (now WeirFoulds LLP). Arnup worked under prominent partners including Gershom W. Mason and Roy Kellock, handling, among other things, the famous Dionne quintuplets legal matters.

He became one of the leading litigators in Ontario courts. During World War II, Arnup served with the Wartime Prices and Trade Board, working on price and rent controls and prosecuting regulatory violations. In 1949 he played a role in the reorganization of legal education in Ontario. Arnup was named a King's Counsel in 1950, and he was a bencher (board member) of the Law Society of Upper Canada from 1951 to 1970. As Treasurer (president) of the Law Society from 1964 to 1966, he guided the development of Ontario's first program of paid legal aid and facilitated the move of Osgoode Hall Law School from the Law Society to York University.

In 1968 he won a notable victory over another noted litigator, John Robinette, in the four-year-long Texas Gulf Sulphur case, at the time the longest civil trial in Canadian legal history. Bertha Wilson, later a judge of the Supreme Court of Canada, described it as "Ontario's two most outstanding counsel facing off against each other under the keen and critical eye of its most outstanding judge," George Alexander Gale.

== Ontario Court of Appeal ==
In 1970 Justice Gale, by then Chief Justice of Ontario, was seeking to strengthen the Court of Appeal for Ontario by recruiting top advocates, beginning with Arnup. "If I can get you, I can get anybody," Gale told Arnup, and Arnup accepted the appointment. He was part of what grew into one of Canada's most respected appellate courts.

== Retirement and death ==
Arnup retired in 1985, and wrote Middleton: The Beloved Judge, a biography of former justice of the Supreme Court of Ontario William Middleton, which was published in 1988.

In 1989, he was made an Officer of the Order of Canada "for his contributions to his Church, to legal education in the Province of Ontario and for his work in the development of Osgoode Hall Law School".

Arnup died in Toronto on 5 October 2005, age 94, after a brief illness.

== Legacy ==
The Arnup Cup, named after John Arnup, is the annual trial advocacy competition for Ontario law schools, conducted before a Superior Court judge. The winning team advances to the Sopinka Cup, Canada's national trial advocacy competition.
