= Thompson Rivers University Faculty of Law =

Public law school in Kamloops, British Columbia

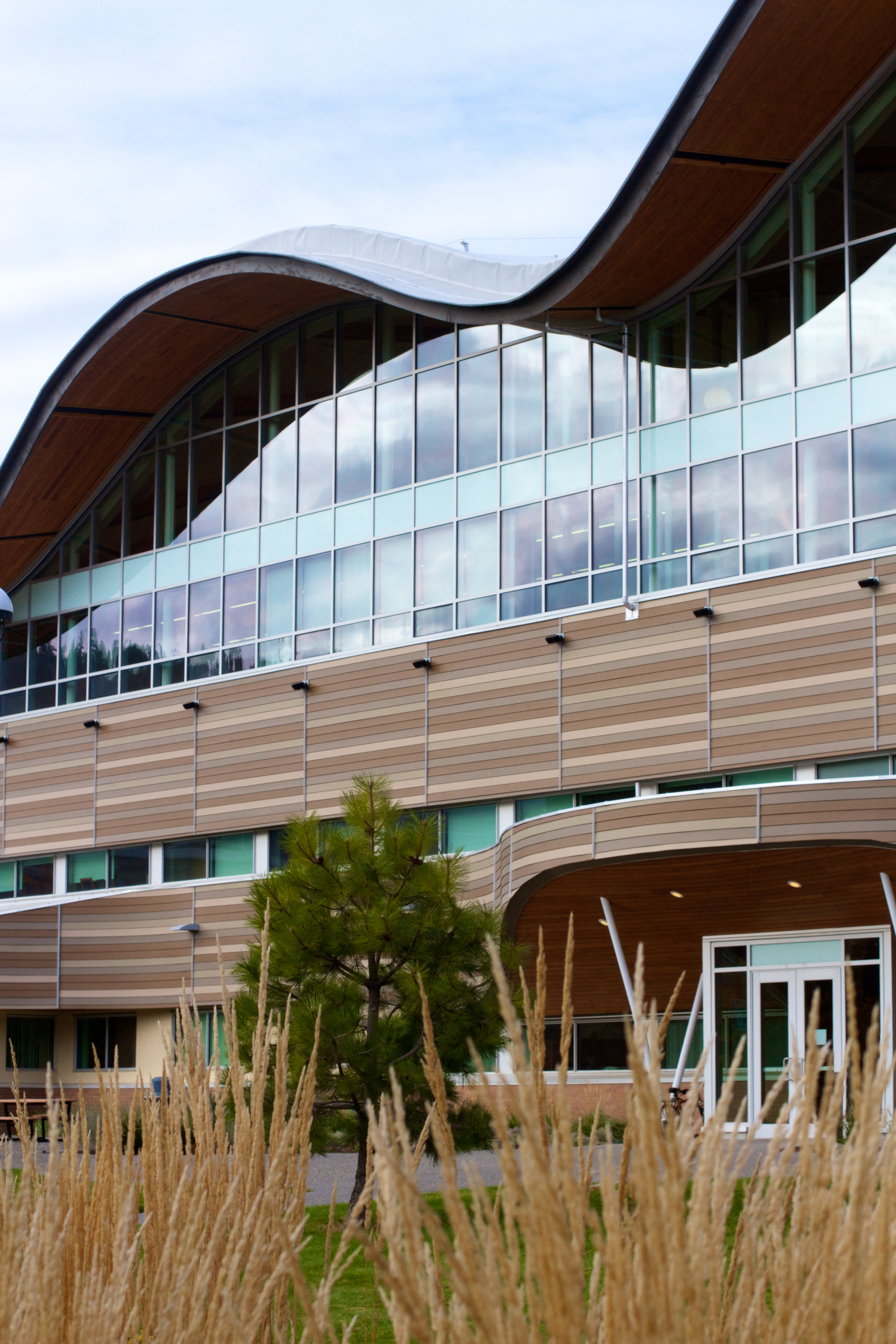
- Motto: Secwepemctsín: T7ETSXEMÍNTE RE STSELXMÉM
- Parent school: Thompson Rivers University
- Established: 2011; 15 years ago
- School type: Public law school
- Parent endowment: $36 million (2022–2023)
- Dean: Daleen Millard
- Location: Kamloops, British Columbia, Canada
- Enrolment: 335
- Faculty: 40
- Website: TRU Law

Thompson Rivers University Faculty of Law (TRU Law) is the law school of Thompson Rivers University, a public research university located in Kamloops, British Columbia, Canada.

One of the three law schools in British Columbia, and the only law school in the Interior, the Faculty offers a single degree: a three-year Juris Doctor that is accredited by the Federation of Law Societies of Canada. The first year class - 1L - is divided into three sections, with approximately 45 students in each section. Every 1L student is placed in one of these sections and has all of their 1L classes with their colleagues in that section.

According to the Faculty's employment disclosures, 99% of the Class of 2024 graduates and 100% of Class of 2025 graduates who were seeking articling positions obtained them within nine months of graduation.

== History ==
=== Founding and rationale ===
Thompson Rivers University Faculty of Law was established to address a critical gap in legal education and services in British Columbia's interior and northern regions. The law school was founded to meet a need for legal education based in interior and northern BC, driven in part by the lack of legal services and access to justice in many non-metropolitan communities in British Columbia and Alberta. As the first law school in the BC Interior, TRU Law's location in Kamloops was strategically chosen to serve communities that historically lacked adequate access to legal services.

TRU Law adopted the University of Calgary Faculty of Law curriculum on May 1, 2010, in advance of its opening in Fall 2011. According to former University of Calgary Faculty of Law Dean Alastair Lucas, Calgary's focus on natural resources, energy, and environmental law is "uniquely suited to academic priorities at TRU and we are excited to provide them together with a program that focuses on practical legal skills instruction."

=== Opening and early years ===
TRU Law officially opened to students on September 6, 2011, with a first year class of 75 students and 10 faculty members. The ceremonial opening was attended by several dignitaries, including the then Chief Justice of the British Columbia Court of Appeal Lance Finch, Attorney General of British Columbia Wally Oppal, Q.C., and Canadian Bar Association BC Chapter President Sharon Matthews.

=== Growth and development ===
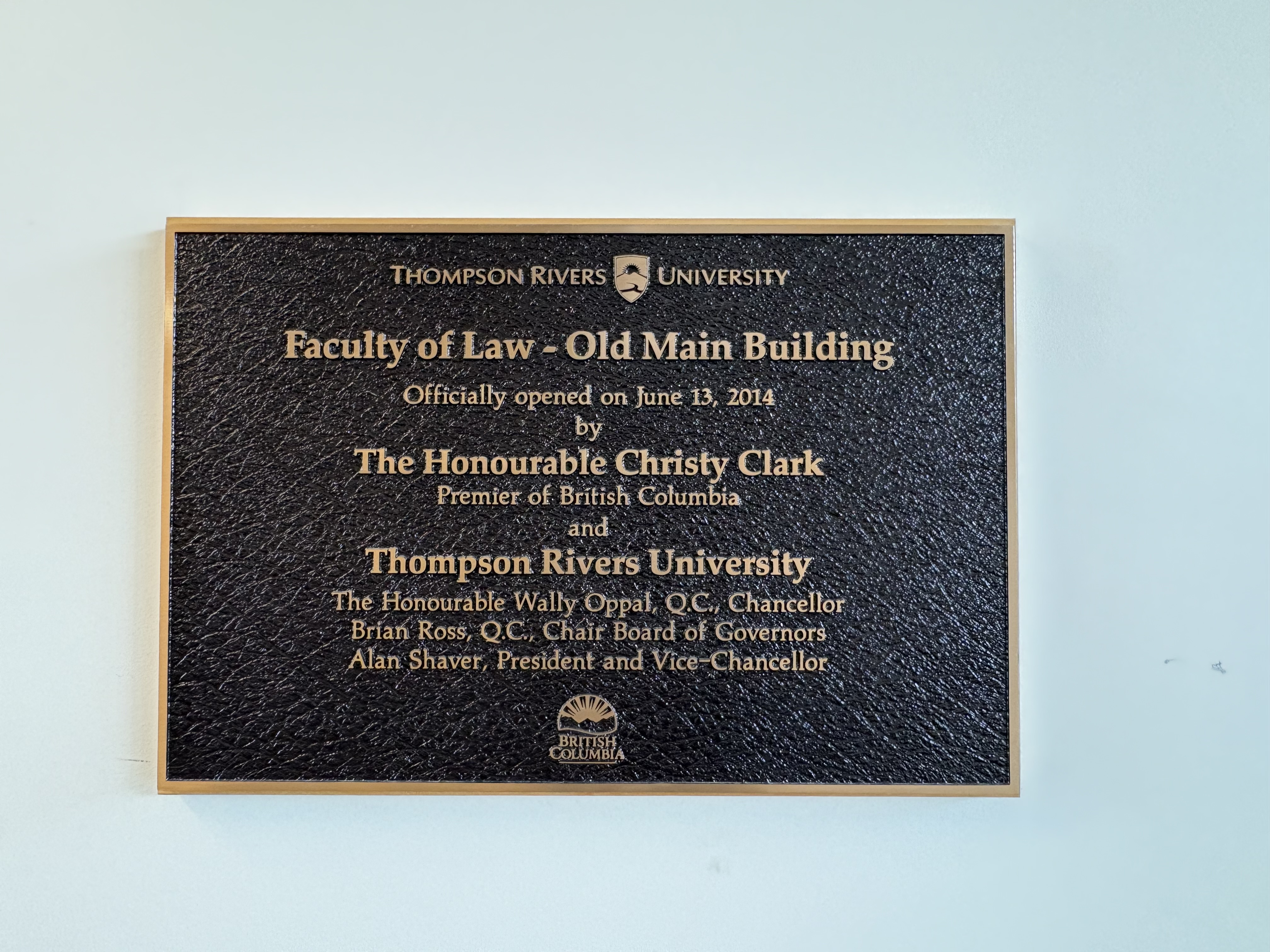
Opening plaque commemorating the opening of TRU Law's Old Main building by the then-Premier of British Columbia Christy Clark

The faculty experienced rapid growth in its first decade. From its first class of 71 students in 2011, it grew to a full cohort of 330 students by the early 2020s. The number of first-year seats increased from 75 to approximately 124 students annually.

=== Indigenous relations ===
From its inception, TRU Law has emphasized engagement with Indigenous communities. The faculty incorporates into its first-year program a day of learning at the former Kamloops Indian Residential School (now the Chief Louis Centre) and Secwepemc Museum and Heritage Park. The faculty developed a mandatory second-year course addressing the Truth and Reconciliation Commission's Call to Action #28.

== Academics ==
=== Faculty ===
TRU Law employs more than 40 full-time and sessional faculty members, with a student-to-faculty ratio of approximately 14:1. Full-time faculty members are as follows:

- Daleen Millard (Dean)
- Desmond MacMillan (Assistant Dean)
- Chris Hunt (Department Chair)
- Andrew Pilliar
- Ashley Barnes
- Blair A. Major
- Bradford Morse
- Craig E. Jones, K.C.
- David Ross
- Jack W. Nelson
- Kate Mitchell
- Katie Sykes
- Krish Maharaj
- Mark Mancini
- Michelle Terriss
- Murray Sholty
- Nicole Schabus
- Robert Chambers
- Robert Diab
- Ruby Dhand
- Ryan Gauthier
- Seán Patrick Donlan
- Ted Murray

=== Admission ===
Admission to the JD program requires a minimum of 90 undergraduate credits (including 30 upper-level credits) completed by December 31 of the year prior to intake. Like all Canadian law schools, admission is competitive; the Faculty receives around 800 applications annually for 124 available seats. Admitted students typically have at least an A− average, with average Law School Admission Test (LSAT) scores around 160.

Applications are accepted under three categories: General; Indigenous Canadian; and Discretionary Consideration. Required application materials include a personal statement, resume, LSAT score, and official transcripts from all post-secondary institutions. Reference letters are required only for Indigenous Canadian and Discretionary category applicants. Applications are evaluated using a formula that weighs GPA (60%) and LSAT score (40%), plus additional holistic considerations derived from the personal statement, resume, and the reference letters (if applicable).

=== Curriculum ===
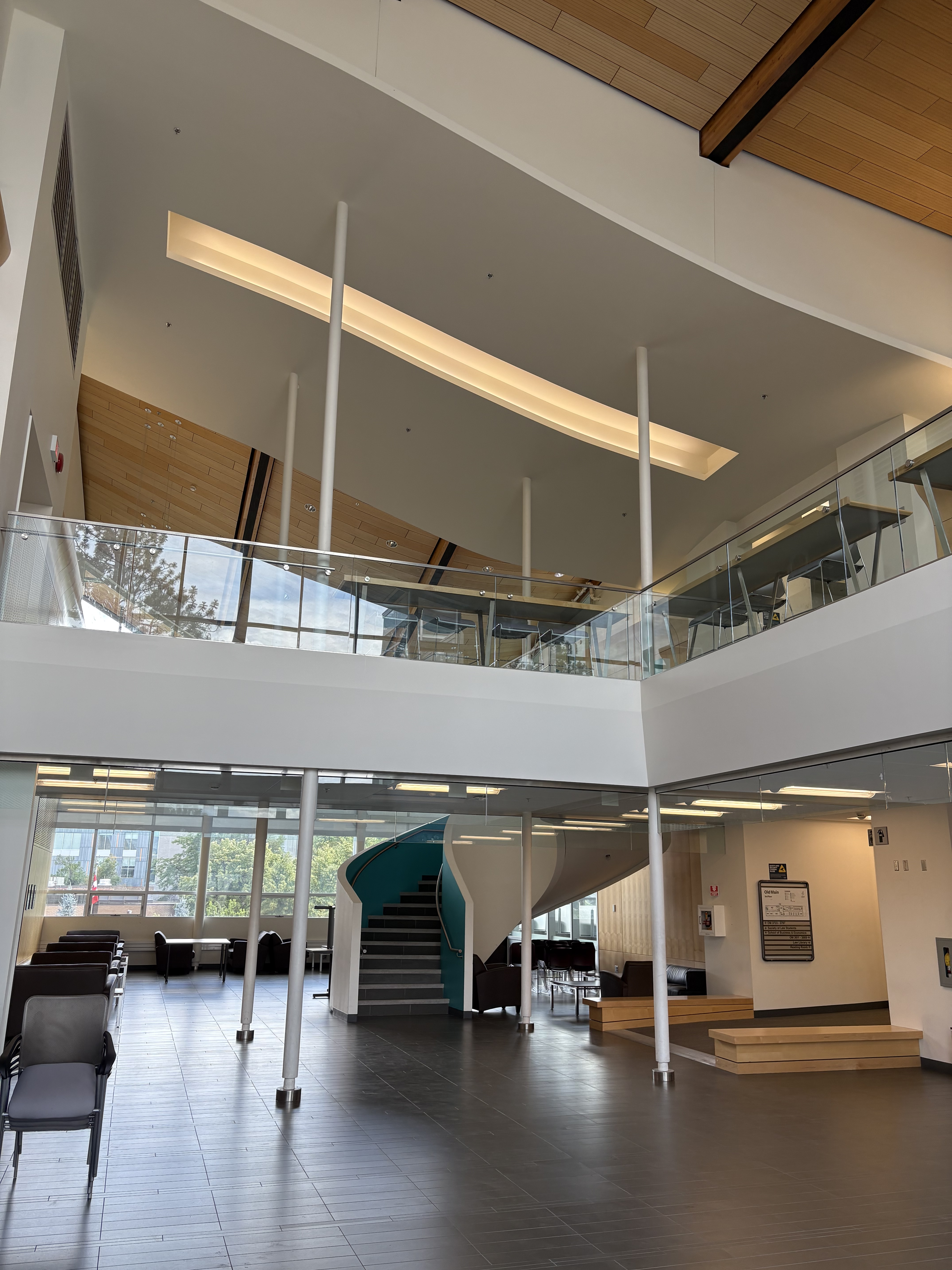
Interior of Old Main

The JD curriculum is structured with 36 credits of required first-year courses, followed by 21 credits of required upper-year courses and 39 credits of elective courses in the second and third years.

Each class in the JD program has approximately 120 students. First-year courses include:

- Constitutional Law
- Contracts
- Crime: Law and Procedure
- Property
- Torts
- Fundamental Legal Skills
- Law, Administration and Policy

Upper-year students must complete required courses in Administrative Law, Business Associations, Civil Procedure, Dispute Resolution, Ethical Lawyering, Evidence, and Truth and Rebuilding Canadian Indigenous Legal Relations. Upper-year students also take electives, including a number of unique courses rarely offered elsewhere in Canada, including video game law, sports law, animal law and space law.

Additionally, students must fulfill both a perspectives requirement and a writing requirement through their elective coursework. The perspectives requirement seeks to ensure exposure to legal theory, philosophy, or perspectives-related learning, while the writing requirement seeks to develop legal writing skills. TRU law students are also eligible to complete an internship at the Provincial Court of British Columbia as part of their studies.

=== Mooting ===
The Faculty strongly promotes mooting amongst its students. In 2015 and again in 2024, the TRU Law team won the Begbie Trophy at the British Columbia Law Schools Competitive Moot, defeating teams from the University of British Columbia and the University of Victoria. In addition, TRU Law students have placed well in the Wilson Moot held each year in Toronto, placing First Place Facta in 2018. TRU Law teams also achieved first place in the Immigration, Refugee, and Citizenship Law Moot in 2023 and second place in 2024. In the Philip C. Jessup International Law Moot Court Competition, TRU Law achieved the Top Applicant Memorial award in 2022 and proceeded to the White & Case Advanced Rounds in 2023.

=== Exchange partners ===
The faculty has established exchange programs with several international law schools. Current exchange partners include:

- European Business School, Germany
- Université catholique de Lyon, France
- Masaryk University, Czech Republic
- University of Wrocław, Poland
- University of Münster, Germany

== Centers, clinics, and community involvement ==
=== Community Legal Clinic ===
The Thompson Rivers University Community Legal Clinic is the first and only student-staffed free legal clinic in the British Columbia Interior. Students work under the guidance of 3 supervising lawyers to provide legal assistance and advice in a range of areas to those who would otherwise be unable to afford legal assistance.

=== Canadian Centre for Elder Law ===
Since 2025, the Canadian Centre for Elder Law has been housed at the Faculty. The Centre conducts research, and develops reports and educational tools on legal and policy issues related to aging, and collaborates with community stakeholders and organizations to identify and address subjects that impact older people.

=== Student organizations ===
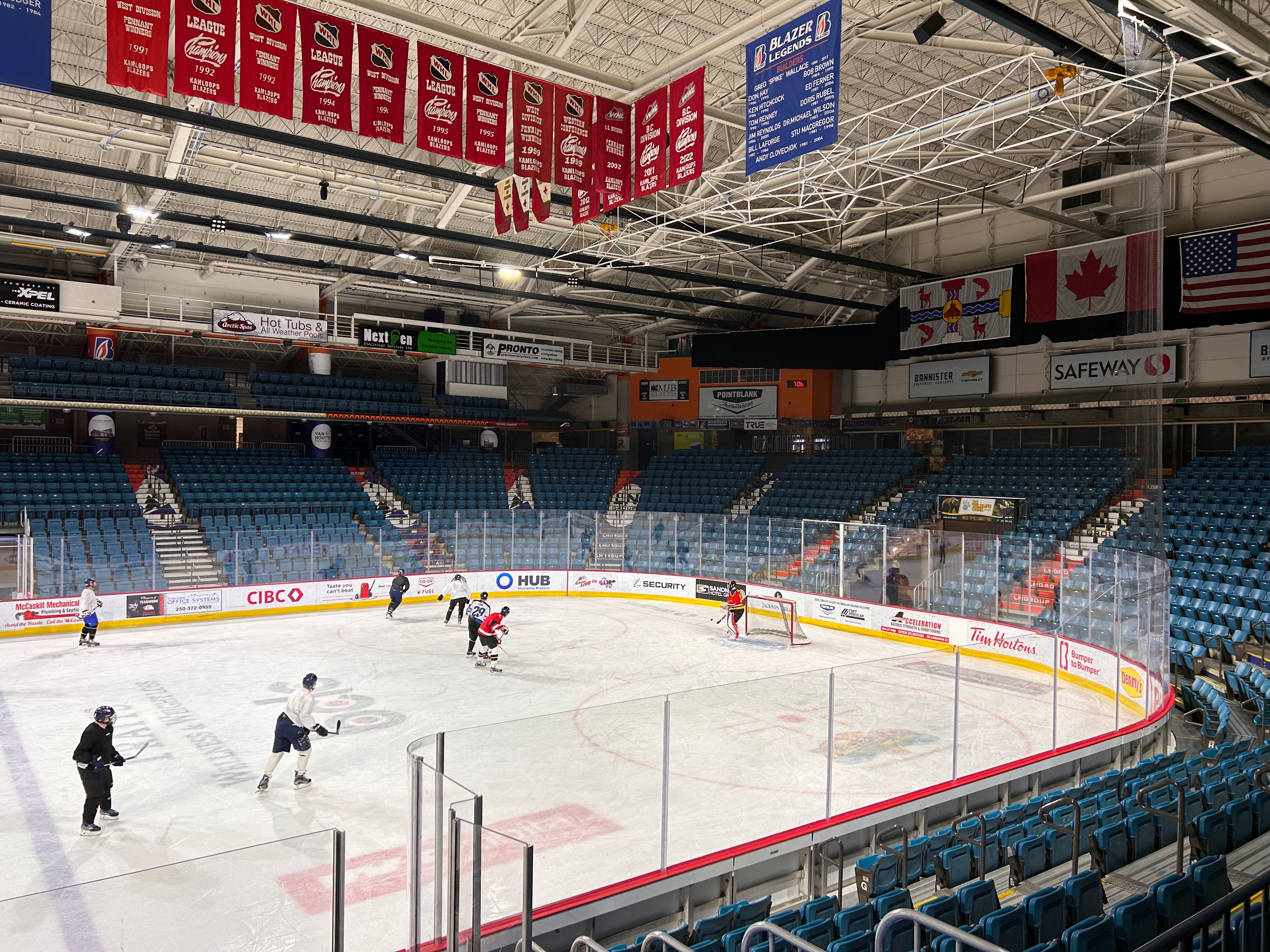
Hockey match between the TRU Lawggers and the TRU Law Alumni at the Sandman Centre

Established in October 2011, the primary student organization is the TRU Society of Law Students (TRU SLS). A number of clubs operate under the TRU SLS banner, including the TRU Oral Advocacy Club, TRU Lawcapellants, TRU South Asian Law Students Association, TRU Indigenous Law Students Association, Asia Pacific Law Students Association, Black Law Students' Association, Criminal Law Club, Hiking Club, Digital Media Entertainment, Business Law Society, Labour and Employment Law Club, Law Needs Feminism Because - TRU Chapter, Crib Club, Golf Club, Legal Innovation Association, OutLaws, Securities Law Club, Science and Law Club, Law Hockey Club, Law Rugby, and TRU Animal Law Advocacy. There are also a number of student-run sports teams that compete in various TRU recreation leagues.

The Faculty also participates in the CBA BC Branch's student mentorship program. This program is designed to match law students with lawyers willing to share their experience and insight into the practice of law.

== Location ==
The Faculty is housed on the third and fourth floors of Thompson Rivers University's 'Old Main' building. Following a $20.2-million renovation, the two floors opened in 2014, providing 45,000-square-feet of learning, library, and student spaces, under an undulating 400-foot-long wooden roof. The south side contains double-height spaces for the reading room and main teaching areas, while the north houses the law library and offices with views of Mt. Peter and Mt. Paul. The design incorporates elements reflecting regional First Nations heritage, including cedar finishes and facade patterns inspired by traditional basket-weaving techniques. A central north-south atrium serves as the main circulation and gathering space.

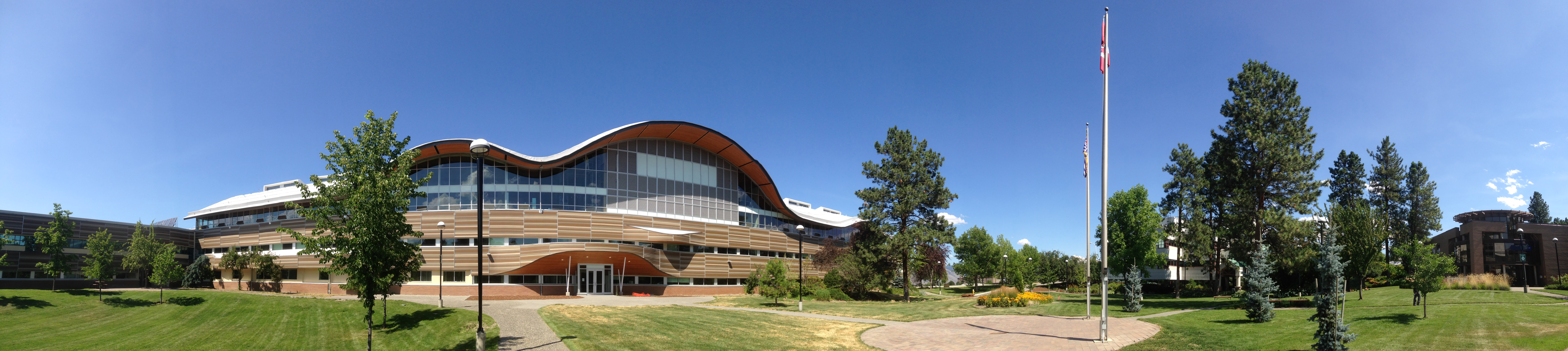
Old Main

== Tuition, awards and prizes ==
For the 2024–2025 academic year, first year tuition is $21,731.40, with additional fees of $1,329.04, bringing the expected cost of attendance to $23,060.44 per year. TRU Law offers a broad array of scholarships, bursaries and course prizes, including entrance scholarships funded by the Canadian Bar Association, the Law Foundation of British Columbia, Fulton & Company LLP, and Gregory S. Pun, K.C.
