= Jesse H. Arnup =

11th Moderator of the United Church of Canada, 1881–1965

The Very Reverend Jesse H. Arnup DD
- Moderator of the United Church of Canada
- Installed: 1944
- Term ended: 1946
- Predecessor: John R.P. Sclater
- Successor: Thomas W. Jones

Personal details
- Born: 18 July 1881 Norfolk County, Ontario
- Died: 4 April 1965 (aged 83) Toronto
- Spouse: Ella Maud Leeson
- Children: John; Harold; Grey; Mary; Bill; Ella "Ruth"
- Profession: Minister
- Education: Victoria College, Toronto

Jesse Henry Arnup (18 July 1881 – 4 April 1965) was a minister of the Methodist Church of Canada and the United Church of Canada who became the 11th Moderator of the United Church.

== Early life ==
Jesse H. Arnup was born in Norfolk County, Ontario near Aylmer to James and Sarah (née Smiley) Arnup, the seventh of eight children. He went to high school at Aylmer Collegiate Institute, then became a rural school teacher near Aylmer for several years. Feeling a call to ministry, Arnup applied to become a minister of the Methodist Church, and was sent out to Moose Jaw and Estevan, Saskatchewan as a student minister. He also enrolled at Victoria College, University of Toronto, earning his bachelor's degree in 1909, and winning the Prince of Wales Gold Medal and the Literary Society Medal in Oratory. He then attended divinity classes at Victoria College. Upon earning his Bachelor of Divinity in 1910, he was ordained as a Methodist minister, and married Ella Maud Leeson.

== Methodist Church ==
Rather than moving to a church congregation as a minister, Arnup became Secretary of the Laymen's Missionary Movement of the Methodist Church in 1910. Three years later, he became the Assistant Secretary of the Methodist Church's Foreign Mission Department.

== Ecumenism ==
The early 20th century saw the rise of an international ecumenical movement, resulting in the formation of the International Missionary Council. Arnup, convinced that eventually there would be one worldwide Christian church, took an active part in many of the Council's committees, and attended its assemblies in Madras in 1938 and Whitby in 1947. He also played a leading role in the Foreign Missions Conference of North America, which became the Division of Foreign Missions of the National Council of Churches of Christ. And he attended the first Assembly of the World Council of Churches in Amsterdam in 1948.

== United Church ==
The late 19th and early 20th century had seen a movement arise across Canada to amalgamate the Methodist, Presbyterian and Congregational churches, which came to fruition in 1925 with the formation of the United Church of Canada. Arnup immediately became Secretary of the new church's Foreign Mission Board (later known as the Board of Overseas Missions). He held this post for over a quarter of a century, and saw both enthusiasm for missionary work reach its peak in the 1920s and 30s, then the upheavals caused by World War II, the break-up of colonialism following the war, and the strife of the Communist Revolution in China that ended most missionary work there. During the tumult in China, Arnup considered communism to be "the Antichrist", but after the Communist victory, he came about to the view that this would bring progress to Asia. During this time, he corresponded frequently with Lester Pearson, then the Canadian Undersecretary for Foreign Affairs regarding Canada's policy towards China, and recommended to Pearson that Canada recognize Communist China.

He travelled to meet with missionaries in the field several times, notably Japan and China several times, as well as Africa, India and Korea. Several times he wrote articles about his travels and those he had met for the United Church Observer.

In 1937, just over a decade after the formation of the United Church, Arnup wrote A New Church Faces a New World, a book that examined the evolving role and challenges of The United Church of Canada during the interwar period and the Great Depression.

== Moderator ==
In 1944, at the eleventh General Council of the United Church, Arnup was elected to be Moderator of the United Church. During his two-year term, Arnup organized evangelical rallies across Canada and Newfoundland on the 20th anniversary of the United Church. As World War II wound down, Arnup asked the church to consider Christianity's place in the new world order.

== Retirement ==
After stepping down as moderator in 1946, Arnup continued to head the Board of Overseas Missions until he retired in 1952, age 71. At his retirement, Dr. A.W. Lindsay, a former missionary, recalled that Arnup had "been our adviser, arbiter, counsellor, yes, and mediator, father confessor, and friend. And who but Dr. Arnup would remember to add a P.S. to letters giving football scores or news of the baseball world."

In his retirement, Arnup wrote book reviews for The Observer, and continued to take part in the life and work of the Toronto church he had attended for over 30 years.

== Personal life and death ==
Arnup and his wife Emma had six children:

- John, a judge on the Ontario Court of Appeal who pioneered universal legal aid in Ontario
- Harold, a football player for the Toronto Varsity Blues in 1930 (and holder of two Blues' records, for longest punt during a play-off game [90 yds] and highest punt average in a play-off game [58.6 yds]) and Toronto Argonauts, who went on to become an overseas missionary, and then longtime chief financial officer of the United Church of Canada
- Grey, Department of Agriculture in Ottawa
- Mary
- Bill, medical doctor in Lindsay, Ontario
- Ella "Ruth" May

Arnup died following a lengthy illness on 4 April 1965, age 83.

== Honours ==
- Wesley College, Winnipeg conferred an honorary Doctor of Divinity degree on Arnup in 1924.
- His alma mater, Victoria College, conferred on him an honorary Doctor of Divinity in 1945.

Religious titles
Preceded by John R.P. Sclater	Moderator of the United Church of Canada; 1944–1946	Succeeded by Thomas W. Jones
