= David Paciocco =

Canadian jurist

David M. Paciocco

Justice of the Court of Appeal for Ontario
- Incumbent
- Assumed office April 17, 2017
- Preceded by: John I. Laskin

Personal details
- Education: University of Western Ontario (LL.B.); Oxford University (B.C.L.)

David M. Paciocco is a justice of the Court of Appeal for Ontario in Toronto, Ontario. Paciocco has authored several books on criminal law and is considered one of Canada's foremost experts on the law of evidence.

== Career ==
Paciocco completed his undergraduate degree at the University of Western Ontario and a master's degree in law from the University of Oxford. Paciocco was hired by the University of Ottawa Faculty of Law in 1982 and was called to the Ontario bar in 1983. He was a member of the legal team that defended the Canadian Red Cross in the tainted blood scandal. From 1994 to 1998, Paciocco was counsel in private practice. Paciocco also later taught at the University of Windsor Faculty of Law. In 1999, he published Getting Away With Murder: The Canadian Criminal Justice System, a book intended for the public about the Canadian criminal justice system. In June 2005, Paciocco was nominated to receive an Honorary Doctorate from Laurentian University.

In 2010 a Toronto Star investigation revealed that since becoming the ombudsman for the Canadian military in 2001 and then Ontario Ombudsman in 2005, André Marin had awarded Paciocco over $250,000 in untendered government contracts. Marin and Paciocco complained about the article to the Ontario Press Council, which upheld with the complaint, finding the implications to be unfounded.

=== Judge ===
In 2011, Paciocco was appointed a judge of the Ontario Court of Justice for the Ottawa region. In 2014, Paciocco struck down the Government of Canada's mandatory victim surcharge, finding that it amounted to cruel and unusual punishment. Ontario prosecutors appealed the decision, but later dropped it after a ruling by Justice Bruce Glass of the Ontario Superior Court of Justice upheld the mandatory victim surcharge. In a later decision, Paciocco said he was bound to follow the higher court's ruling, but in an unusual move, offered detailed criticism of the decision.

In 2015, Paciocco convicted a volunteer firefighter of drunk driving, although he threw out the blood alcohol testing after finding police violated the driver's rights.

On April 7, 2017, Paciocco was elevated to the Court of Appeal for Ontario.
