= John Sopinka =

Canadian Supreme Court justice (1933–1997)

The Honourable John Sopinka

Puisne Justice of the Supreme Court of Canada
- In office May 24, 1988 – November 24, 1997
- Nominated by: Brian Mulroney
- Preceded by: Willard Estey
- Succeeded by: Ian Binnie

Personal details
- Born: March 19, 1933 Broderick, Saskatchewan, Canada
- Died: November 24, 1997 (aged 64) Ottawa, Ontario, Canada

John Sopinka (March 19, 1933 – November 24, 1997) was a Canadian lawyer and puisne justice on the Supreme Court of Canada, the first Ukrainian-Canadian appointed to the high court.

== Early life and education ==
Sopinka was born in Broderick, Saskatchewan, and lived there until his Ukrainian Canadian family moved to Hamilton, Ontario. He completed secondary school at Saltfleet High School in Stoney Creek. He earned Bachelor of Arts and Bachelor of Laws degrees at the University of Toronto where he was a member of the Toronto chapter of the Beta Theta Pi fraternity. While studying law, he also played professional football. He was drafted in the sixth round of the 1955 CFL draft. He played with the Toronto Argonauts (1955 to 1957, 29 games) and then the Montreal Alouettes (1957, 8 games) of the Canadian Football League.

== Career ==
He was called to the bar of Ontario in 1960 and practiced law at Fasken & Calven before becoming a senior partner at Stikeman Elliott. He was designated Queen's Counsel in 1975 and was also a lecturer at both the Osgoode Hall Law School and the University of Toronto Faculty of Law. He authored several books on the law, including a leading text on the law of evidence.

Sopinka was involved with several high-profile cases, including acting on behalf of Susan Nelles when she sued the government of Ontario and the Toronto police for malicious prosecution after the withdrawal of charges against her for murdering babies at the Hospital for Sick Children in Toronto. An inquiry into her case exonerated her and she won damages from the government for her ordeal. In 1986 he represented the Civil Liberties Commission of the Ukrainian Canadian community, the CLC at the Deschênes Commission of Inquiry on War Criminals and argued against the deportation of suspected war criminals to their native lands, particularly the Soviet Union. He also served as counsel to the William Parker Inquiry that looked into the conduct of former cabinet minister Sinclair Stevens.

== Appointment to the Supreme Court of Canada ==
A noted trial lawyer, he was appointed directly to the Supreme Court of Canada on May 24, 1988 without ever having been a judge. At the time it was highly unusual for a Supreme Court of Canada appointee to have had no prior judicial experience. Following Sopinka's death, the court's next appointee, Ian Binnie, also came directly from private practice.

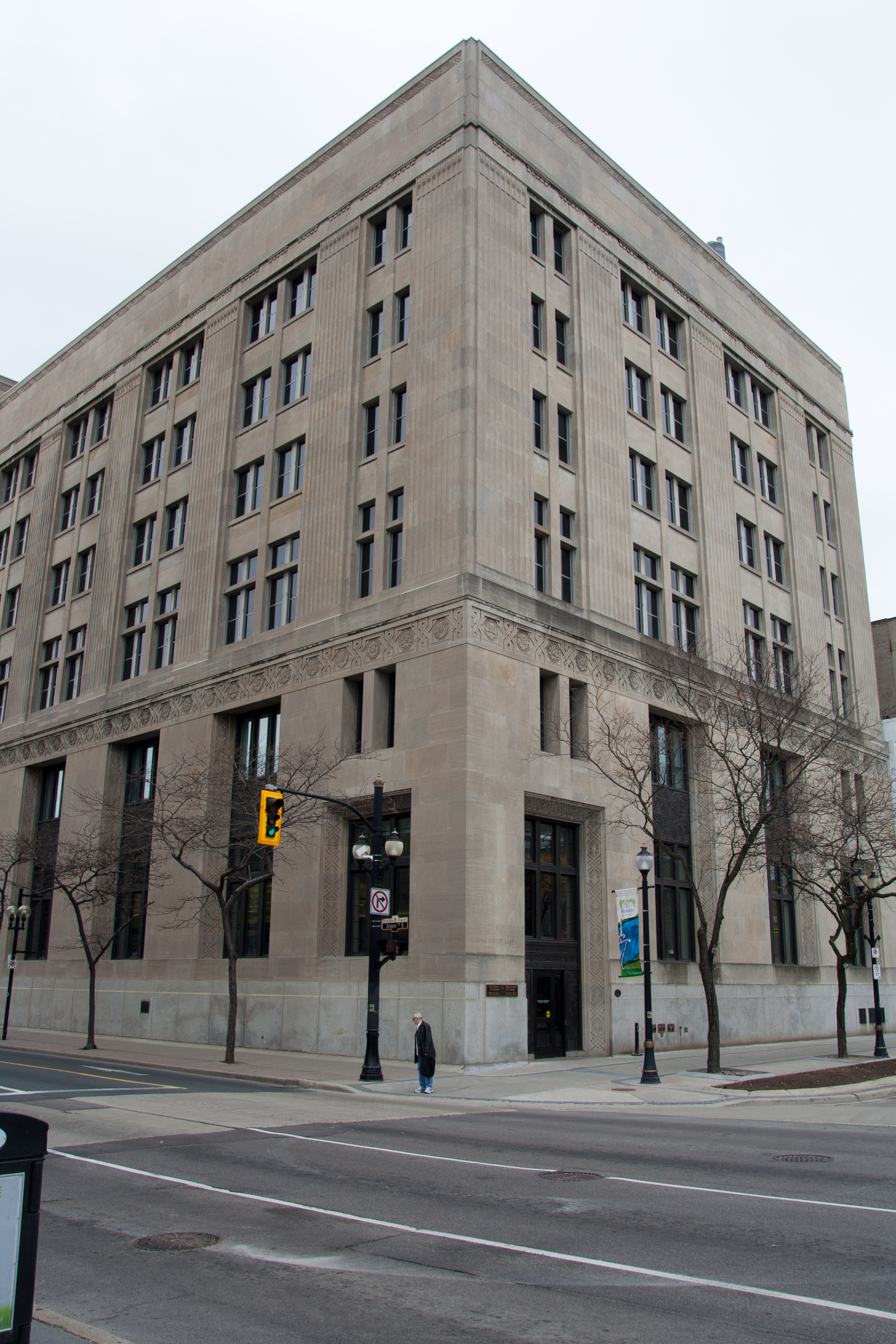
The John Sopinka Courthouse, named after the first Ukrainian-Canadian judge of the Supreme Court of Canada.

== Death ==
Sopinka died in Ottawa on November 24, 1997, of a blood disease.

== Posthumous recognition ==
In 1999, a new courthouse in downtown Hamilton was named in his honour. The John Sopinka Courthouse has 18 courtrooms, accommodating Hamilton's civil, criminal, and small claims courts. The government of Canada had purchased and renovated the Dominion Public Building for an estimated $64-million. The building was erected in 1935-36 and served as the main post office until 1991.

Also in 1999, the Sopinka Cup was established. This is a national mock trial competition open to law students from law faculties all over Canada. In 2000, the volume Ruled by Law: Essays in Memory of Mr. Justice John Sopinka was published as a special edition of the Supreme Court Law Review (volume 12, second series). Many of the contributors were former law clerks of John Sopinka who had gone on to become law professors. The collection was reprinted by Butterworths Canada as a free-standing volume in 2003.

== See also ==
- List of decisions by John Sopinka
- 1988 judgments of the Supreme Court of Canada
- 1989 judgments of the Supreme Court of Canada

Legal offices
Preceded by Willard Estey	Puisne Justice of the Supreme Court of Canada; May 24, 1988 – November 24, 1997	Succeeded by Ian Binnie
