= B. Barry Shapiro =

Canadian judge (1915–2009)

- Born: 1915; Montreal, Quebec
- Died: August 19, 2009 (aged 93–94)
- Title: QC

B. Barry Shapiro, QC (1915 – August 19, 2009) was a Judge in the Ontario Superior Court of Justice, in Canada from 1971 until he retired in 1990 from that post.

He was born in Montreal, Quebec and moved to study and practice law in Toronto, Ontario where he contributed to the Province's legal environment.

== Education and career ==
- Shapiro attended the University of Toronto and graduated from the Osgoode Hall Law School in 1941.
- Served during World War II and continued with the Canadian Army Reserve, achieving the rank of Colonel.
- Attained Queen's Counsel and Bencher of The Law Society of Upper Canada
- Former President of the Medicolegal Society of Toronto.
- Former Chairman of the Peel Regional Board of Commissioners of Police in 1973.
- Senior Judge for the Judicial District of Peel in 1971 and then later as a Judge of the Ontario Superior Court.
- Appointed Commissioner for the Royal Commission on the Toronto Jail and Custodial Services
- Member of the Ontario Review Board
- Appointed Aide-de-Camp for the Lieutenant Governor of Ontario
