= University of Calgary Faculty of Law =

Canadian law faculty

Faculty of Law
- Motto: Mo Shùile Togam Suas
- Motto in English: I will lift up my eyes
- Type: Law school
- Established: 1976; 50 years ago
- Affiliations: University of Calgary
- Dean: Laura Spitz
- Academic staff: 31
- Administrative staff: 21
- Students: 450
- Location: Calgary, Alberta, Canada; 51.0771°N 114.1285°W
- Website: www.law.ucalgary.ca

The University of Calgary Faculty of Law, at the University of Calgary (U of C), is a law school in Calgary, Alberta.

UCalgary Law has approximately 31 full-time faculty and 400 students in the JD program. With 130 first year spots and approximately 1,300 applicants per year, this law school has an acceptance rate of less than 10%

== History ==
University rankings

World rankings

Canadian rankings

Calgary College opened the first Faculty of Law in Calgary in 1913. However, the college permanently disbanded at the outbreak of World War I in 1914 . The only law school in Alberta for the next 62 years was the Faculty of Law at the University of Alberta in Edmonton.

In 1971 an ad hoc committee with representation from the Bench and the Bar strongly recommended creating the Faculty of Law at the U of C. In 1973, a government committee made the same recommendation to the Alberta Minister of Advanced Education.

Both the Calgary Bar and the City of Calgary sought ways to make significant financial contributions for the development of a law library. In September 1974, the Ministry of Advanced Education gave its final approval to the proposal for the establishment of the Faculty of Law.

The Faculty of Law opened in 1976 with a first-year class of sixty students and nine faculty members.

== Deans ==
The first Dean of the Faculty of Law, John McLaren (U of C honorary degree recipient, 1997), started his five-year appointment in July 1975. In September 1975, Professor Gail Starr was appointed as the Faculty's first librarian.

In 1984, Margaret Hughes was appointed as the second dean of the Faculty of Law, making her the first female dean of a Canadian Law school in history.

- John McLaren 1975 - 1984
- Margaret Hughes 1984 - 1989
- Constance Hunt 1989 - 1992
- Sheilah Martin 1992 - 1996
- Michael Wylie 1996 - 2001
- Patricia Hughes 2001 - 2006
- Alastair Lucas 2006 - 2011
- Ian Holloway 2011 - 2024
- Evaristus Oshionebo (interim) 2024 - 2025
- Laura Spitz 2025–Present

== JD program ==
The Faculty of Law's Juris Doctor (JD) program is designed to prepare students for a variety of roles within the legal system. The JD program may be completed in three years of full-time study or six years of part-time study.

The academic year is divided into three semesters:

- Fall semester: 13 weeks (3 + 10 for first-year students)
- January semester: 3 weeks
- Winter semester: 10 weeks (late January to March)

The program satisfies the requirements of the Law Societies of common law Canada for admission to the practice of law.

In 2015, the Faculty of Law launched its new Calgary Curriculum, designed to meet a changing legal marketplace.

Admissions for the JD program are based on a variety of factors including GPA, LSAT score (offered through the Law School Admission Council), and personal interest statement. Letters of reference are no longer needed to apply to the JD program as a first-year student, but are still required for other categories of applicants such as upper-year students.

== LL.M program ==
The U of C Faculty of Law offers a thesis-based and a course-based LL.M program, and a Post-baccalaureate Certificate. These programs are focused on Natural Resources, Energy and Environmental Law. The related topics within the focus area, including renewable energy law, water law, administrative law, adapting to climate change and regulating GHG emissions, regulatory theory, taxation, corporate law, economics, contract law, international trade and investment law, Aboriginal law, tort law, environmental ethics, pollution control, waste management, environmental impact law, intellectual property, human rights law and legal theory.

Graduate studies at the law school contribute to general academic research, produce legal scholarship, and develop specialized expertise in focus areas of the legal profession. With permission, graduate law students may also take graduate courses in outside faculties as part of the program.

A general thesis-based LL.M was introduced in 2017.

Admissions for the graduate law programs are granted on a competitive basis by the Faculty of Law in conjunction with the University of Calgary's Faculty of Graduate Studies. In addition to meeting the minimum requirements for the Faculty of Graduate Studies, the Faculty of Law requires a recognized first law degree with a minimum 3.0 average or upper-second class standing. Minimum standards alone are generally not sufficient for successful applicants to this school's graduate program as the annual LL.M. admissions are capped at a small number, thereby further increasing selectivity.

=== Master of Science in Sustainable Energy Development ===
The U of C's Master of Science in Sustainable Energy Development (SEDV) is an interdisciplinary graduate program providing a balanced education related to energy and environmental management. A combined offering through the Haskayne School of Business, Schulich School of Engineering and the Faculties of Law and Environmental Design, SEDV is designed for professionals and students who are seeking a broad-based and comprehensive education in sustainable energy.

== International Energy Lawyers Program ==
In 2012, the Faculty of Law launched a joint degree program with the University of Houston Law Center - the International Energy Lawyers Program (IELP). The program allows students to earn both Canadian and American law degrees in just four years, and enables them to apply for admission to bars in both the US and Canada.

== Centers, institutes and community involvement ==
=== Student Legal Assistance (SLA) ===
Student Legal Assistance has operated since 1979 in order to provide free legal information and representation to low income residents of Calgary and the surrounding regions. SLA is a non-profit, registered charity organization staffed primarily by U of C law students.

=== Canadian Institute of Resources Law ===
The Institute engages in a wide variety of research projects on its own initiative and in response to requests from government and the private sector. Completed studies include mining law in Canada, the application of environmental protection legislation to the forest sector, oil and gas law, and water law in Canada.

Ongoing research includes legal and policy issues in the areas of forestry, water resource management, the petroleum sector, environmental regulation, international trade and mining.

=== Alberta Civil Liberties Research Centre ===
The Alberta Civil Liberties Research Centre, founded by Sheldon M. Chumir, was incorporated in 1982 and is affiliated with the Alberta Civil Liberties Association, and the University of Calgary. The Research Centre receives core funding from the Alberta Law Foundation and project funding from private foundations as well as from the federal and provincial governments.

=== Public Interest Law Clinic ===
The Public Interest Law Clinic is a legal clinic at the University of Calgary Faculty of Law, created to advocate for the well-being of the public and the environment. Second and third year law students who are taking the PILC clinical course (co-taught by the executive director and a Staff Lawyer) provide services to the PILC's clients. A practicing lawyer, who is licensed and insured by the Law Society of Alberta, supervises the clinic students.

=== ABlawg ===
ABlawg: The University of Calgary Faculty of Law Blog includes commentary by faculty members, sessional instructors, research associates at our affiliated institutes, and students on court and tribunal decisions as well as legislative and policy developments in Alberta and beyond.

== See also ==
- List of law schools in Canada
