= WeirFoulds LLP =

Canadian law firm

- Company type: Limited liability partnership
- Industry: Law
- Founded: 1860 in Toronto
- Headquarters: TD Bank Tower; Toronto, Canada
- Services: Legal services
- Number of employees: c. 225
- Website: www.weirfoulds.com

WeirFoulds LLP is a Canadian law firm based in Toronto, Ontario. The firm specializes in litigation, corporate, property and government law. It is one of Canada's oldest law firms.

== History ==
In 1860, Theodore H. Spencer, LL.B., began his practice and opened the firm's first office at 20 Toronto Street, site of the Masonic Temple, built in 1858 by William Kaufman.

WeirFoulds is deeply rooted in Canadian history, stretching back to when Toronto became the industrial center of Ontario in the late 1800s. The firm was founded initially as Spencer and MacDonald in 1870. The firm is currently located in the Toronto-Dominion Bank Tower, at 66 Wellington Street West, in Toronto, Ontario.

In 1883, partner John Rose became the first of 13 lawyers from the firm to be appointed as a federal judge, in the court of Common Pleas. Eight of these judges were appointed to courts of appeal in Canada, including the Supreme Court of Canada.

A number of other WeirFoulds partners became judges. These include former Ontario Chief Justice George Alexander Gale; former SCC justice Roy Kellock; former Ontario Court of Appeal justices John Arnup, who was also a treasurer of the Law Society of Upper Canada, James Carthy and Allan McNiece Austin; Canadian Supreme Court Justice Thomas Cromwell (Canadian jurist); and Ontario Superior Court justices Joan Lax and Paul Perell.

In 1966, the firm prevailed in Leitch Gold Mines v. Texas Gulf, a dispute over vast mineral wealth. At the time, it was the longest civil trial in Canadian history. The firm's corporate practice represented the T. Eaton Company in 1920 to develop what was then the largest department store in Canada, beginning a long relationship with the company that lead the firm, in 1965, to act on its behalf to assemble the land for the Eaton Centre in Toronto, the largest urban redevelopment project in Canada at the time.

From 1974 until the late-1980s, WeirFoulds was retained by the Ontario Hockey Association to handle legal matters and court cases.

In 2003, Derry Millar of the firm was appointed lead counsel in the Ipperwash Inquiry concerning the events surrounding the death of Dudley George who died in 1995 during a First Nations protest at Ipperwash Provincial Park, see Ipperwash Crisis.

The firm's current Chair is Denise Baker. The current Executive Partner (and previous Managing Partner), Lisa Borsook, was one of the first women to be appointed as Managing Partner by a major law firm in Toronto.

== Notable members and alumni ==
- John Arnup, 1970–1985 Court of Appeal, LSUC Treasurer (1963–1966) (see the list of treasurers of the Law Society of Upper Canada)
- Thomas Cromwell, 1997 Appointed to Nova Scotia Court of Appeal, 2008 Appointed to the Supreme Court of Canada
- George Alexander Gale, 1946–1963 High Court of Justice, 1963–1964 Court of Appeal, 1964–1967 Chief Justice of High Court of Justice, 1967–1976 Chief Justice of Ontario
- Roy Kellock, 1942–1944 Court of Appeal, 1944–1958 Supreme Court of Canada
