= Université de Moncton Faculté de droit =

Université de Moncton Faculty of Law
- Parent school: Université de Moncton
- Established: 1978; 48 years ago
- School type: Public law school
- Dean: Érik L. Westin-Eastaugh
- Location: Moncton, New Brunswick, Canada; 46°6′19.1″N 64°46′55.6″W
- Enrollment: 129
- Faculty: 12
- Website: www.umoncton.ca/umcm-droit/

Université de Moncton Faculty of Law is the first, and one of only two law schools in the world offering a common law legal education taught entirely in French, the other being the University of Ottawa Faculty of Law.

== History ==
The faculty was established in 1978 to respond to the needs of New Brunswick people and other Canadians, preferring a francophone education in common law. As a bilingual province, both constitutionally and in practice, New Brunswick is home to a francophone population who follow the common law tradition, unlike Quebec, which is governed by the Civil Code of Quebec. New Brunswick students, therefore, require a school that prepares them for law practice in other parts of Canada.

The Honourable Michel Bastarache, former Puisne Justice on the Supreme Court of Canada, served as one of the first deans of the faculty.

== Admission ==
The faculty admits students based on their GPA, extracurricular activities, interview, questionnaire, and reference letters. As classes are conducted entirely in French, proficiency in French is required. Like other francophone law schools in Canada, the Université de Moncton does not require that its students take the LSAT, although it does consider the LSAT score if provided.

== Degrees offered ==
The Université de Moncton offers the basic J.D. (formerly LL.B.) and the graduate LL.M. The faculty also offers joint degrees: the J.D.-MBA (Masters of Business), J.D.-MAP (Masters in Public Administration) and J.D.-MEE (Maitrise en études de l'environnement/Masters of Environmental Studies). In addition, students who already possess a civil law degree (an LL.L. or a B.C.L.) from a Canadian school can enrol at the Université de Moncton for two semesters to complete a J.D. Lastly, the Faculty offers a D.E.C.L. (Diplôme d'études en common law) for international students seeking an understanding of the common law tradition.

== Notable faculty ==
- James E. Lockyer, Former Minister of Justice of New Brunswick
- Serge Rousselle, Former Minister of Education and Early Childhood Development, and Attorney General of New Brunswick

== Notable alumni ==
- Bernard Lord, Former Premier of New Brunswick
- Brian Gallant, Former Premier of New Brunswick
- J.P. Barry, NHL Player Agent
- Marianne Rivoalen, Chief Justice of the Manitoba Court of Appeal
