= George Alexander Gale =

Canadian judge (1906–1997)

- Born: June 24, 1906; Quebec City, Quebec
- Died: July 25, 1997 (aged 91)
- Awards: Order of Canada

George Alexander Gale, CC QC (June 24, 1906 – July 25, 1997) was a Chief Justice for the province of Ontario, Canada from 1967 until his 1976 retirement from that post.

Born in Quebec City, he moved to Vancouver, British Columbia for his youth before settling in Toronto for his legal career.

== Education and career time line ==
- 1929: Gale graduated from the University of Toronto where he received his Bachelor of Arts
- 1932: Formally became a lawyer following further studies at the Osgoode Hall Law School
- 1944: Became partner of Toronto legal firm Donald, Mason, Weir & Foulds (today known as WeirFoulds LLP)
- 1946: Designated King's Counsel in 1946
- October 30 1946: Became a judge for the Trial Division of Ontario's High Court of Justice
- 1952: King's Counsel designation became Queen's Counsel upon the 1952 accession of Queen Elizabeth II
- 1956: Chief editor for what became known as "Holmestead & Gale", a rewriting of Ontario's court rules
- 1963: Became member of the Ontario Court of Appeal
- June 1 1964: Became Chief Justice of Ontario's High Court of Justice
- September 21 1967: Became Chief Justice of Ontario, the province's highest judicial position
- 1968: Joined executive of the Canadian Judicial Council
- 1969: Judicial Council of Ontario is created with Gale as its first Chairman
- 1976: Retired as Chief Justice of Ontario, subsequently joining the Ontario Law Reform Commission as vice-chair
- 1979: Joined the (Ontario) Premier's Advisory Committee on Confederation

=== Other roles ===
From 1956, he also served for a long term on the Board of Governors of Wycliffe College, a Toronto theological school affiliated with the Anglican Church of Canada. He was also active within that church denomination as a member and Churchwarden (1956–1960) of Toronto's St. John's York Mills parish.

Gale donated a trophy in 1973 for a competition which is today known as the Gale Cup Moot which demonstrates skills in legal argumentation using staged proceedings.

Brother in Delta Kappa Epsilon fraternity (Alpha Phi, University of Toronto)

== Honours ==
- 1969: Honorary Doctor of Laws, York University
- 1977: Companion of the Order of Canada
