= University of Ottawa Faculty of Law =

Public law school in Ottawa, Ontario, Canada

Coordinates: 45.4222°N 75.6824°W

University of Ottawa Faculty of Law Faculté de droit de l'Université d'Ottawa
- Motto: Deus scientiarum Dominus est (Latin)
- Type: Public Law School
- Established: 1953; 73 years ago
- Parent institution: University of Ottawa
- Dean: Kristen Boon, Common Law section Sophie Thériault, Civil Law section
- Faculty: 112 (2025)
- Students: 2,270 (2025)
- Location: Ottawa, Ontario, Canada
- Campus: Fauteux Hall
- Colours: Garnet and Grey
- Website: uottawa.ca/faculty-law

The University of Ottawa Faculty of Law (French: Faculté de droit de l'Université d'Ottawa) is the law school at the University of Ottawa, located in Ottawa, Ontario, Canada. Established in 1953, the faculty is today divided into Civil Law and Common Law sections, the two formally recognized legal traditions in Canada.

The law school has produced a diverse array of successful alumni. These include the current Chief Justice of Canada Richard Wagner, and deans of several law schools.

The faculty is home to several specialist research centres, including the Centre for Health Law, Policy and Ethics; the Public Law Centre; and Centre for Law, Technology and Society.

The faculty is very highly rated and maintains close links with the legal communities in Quebec, Ontario, and abroad. The Faculty of Law is also home to two elite bilingual law journals, one produced by the civil law section and the other produced by the common law section, which have significantly contributed to the development of law by the Supreme Court of Canada.

== History ==
=== The first Faculty of Law (1887 - 1896) ===
In 1887, when Ontario’s Federation Act empowered universities to create law faculties, the University of Ottawa was ready to act. Upon receiving its royal charter more than two decades earlier, the University had already begun laying the groundwork by eliminating the final two years of its Civil Engineering curriculum to free up funds and by securing a pontifical charter from the Vatican to affirm its Catholic identity, even as it welcomed Protestant examiners, professors, and students.

That same year, the University of Ottawa Faculty of Law opened under the leadership of Sir John Sparrow Thompson, a distinguished lawyer who would later serve as Canada’s fourth Prime Minister. From 1892 until his death in 1895, Justice Télésphore Fournier of the Supreme Court of Canada served as Vice-Dean, with Napoléon Belcourt managing administrative affairs as Secretary. Their combined efforts lent the young Faculty both prestige and institutional support, and Sir Richard W. Scott, renowned for his advocacy of separate-school rights in Canada, represented the Faculty in the University Senate, earning an honorary LL.D. in 1889.

At the time, the University of Ottawa Faculty of Law's three-year Bachelor of Laws curriculum was among the most comprehensive in the country, blending common law, equity, Roman law, and international law, while allowing Quebec students to substitute common law courses for certain civil-law subjects. Despite this innovative approach and a steadily growing student body drawn from both Quebec and Ontario, graduates remained bound by the Law Society’s requirement of two additional years at Osgoode Hall before they could practise in Ontario.

Unfortunately, the Faculty would only operate for a few years before closing its doors in 1896; the reasons behind its dissolution remain unclear to this day due to unclear records.

=== The current Faculty of Law (1953 - today) ===
The University of Ottawa Faculty of Law was established in 1953 on the initiative of its first Dean Gerald Fauteux, who would eventually become Chief Justice of the Supreme Court of Canada. The creation of the Faculty followed the adoption of Bill 46 by the National Assembly of Quebec, which recognized that its future civil law graduates would be considered for admission to the Quebec Bar. However, the proposal to create a law school had been blocked by the Law Society of Ontario in the previous years, deeming it to be premature. For this reason, it originally began as an exclusively civil law faculty, designed to train lawyers who would enter the Quebec legal system, particularly in order to practice in the Outaouais region just across the Ottawa River.

In 1957, the faculty began training students in common law as well; the two sections were then divided, each with its own programs, faculties, and deans. Graduate programs were introduced that same year by the civil law section; the common law section followed suit in 1981.

Although the school has, since 1970, had a system in which students enrolled in either the common or civil law section could receive accreditation in the other legal system, it was not until 1994 that this system was formalized into the National Program. In doing so, the faculty became one of the first in Canada to offer bi-juridical training in both the common law and civil law.

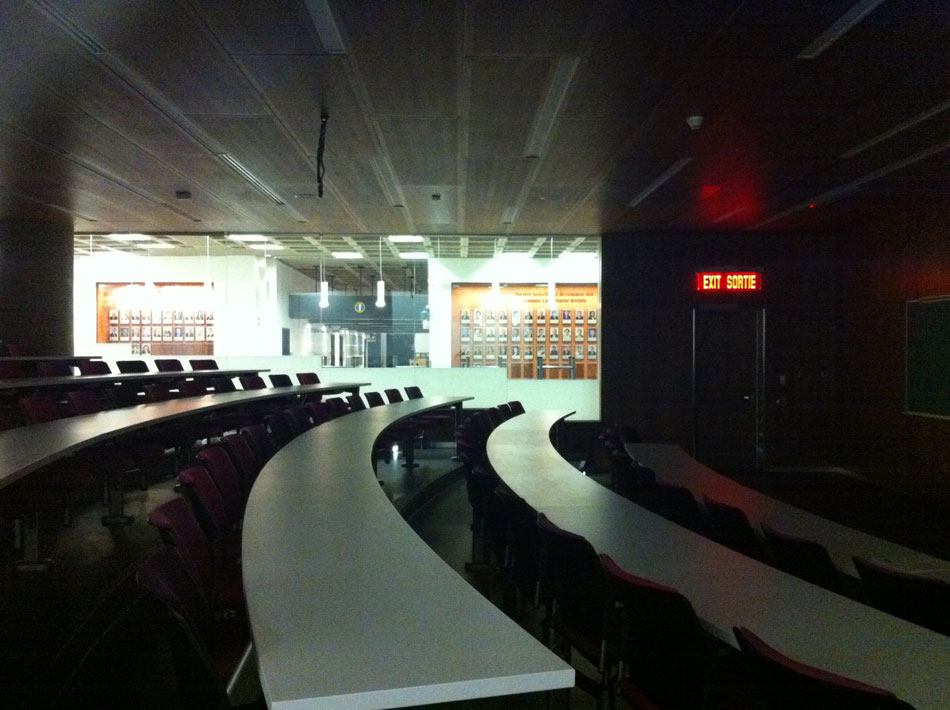
The Norton Rose Classroom

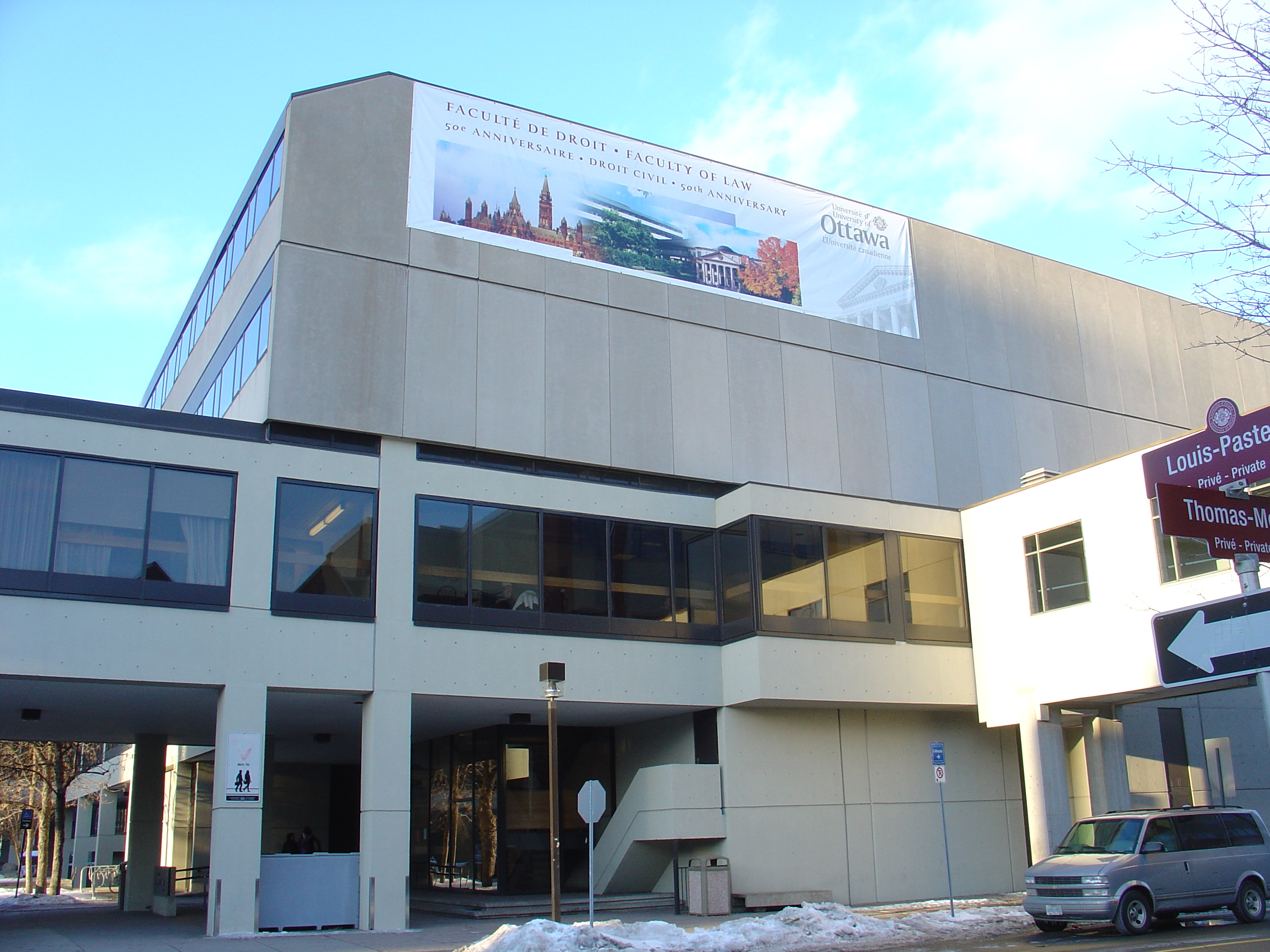
Fauteux Hall is home to the Faculty of Law

The Faculty of Law's current building, Fauteux Hall, was named in honour of Gerald Fauteux and was constructed in 1973. During the 2006 fall semester, then-University of Ottawa president Gilles G. Patry announced that Fauteux Hall would undergo extensive renovations in 2009. Due to funding cutbacks, a new law building expansion was cancelled; instead, interior renovations were completed in 2012, including substantial changes to the entrance atrium and the Brian Dickson Law Library, and the construction of the Norton Rose Fulbright classroom. Construction of the Ian G. Scott Courtroom, a fully functional courtroom where sitting judges hear regular cases, was also completed in the Brooks Building, which is across the street from the main Faculty of Law building and houses extra classrooms, offices, and spaces for the Faculty of Law's various centres.

== Admissions ==
=== Common law section ===
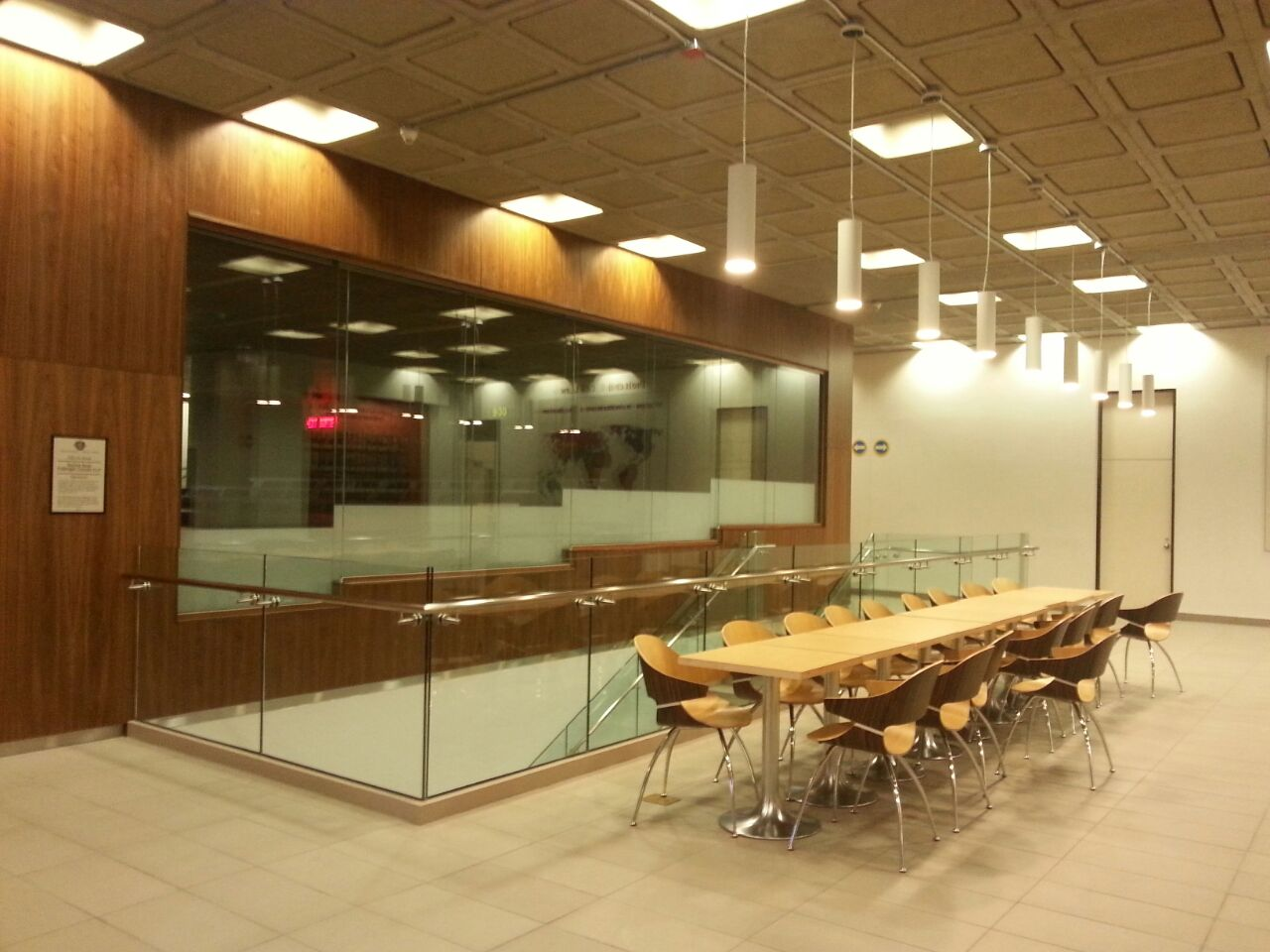
Third floor, Fauteux Hall

In the Common Law Section, applicants are expected to have completed at least three years of undergraduate studies. Acceptance to the common law program is highly competitive. Successful applicants generally have an A− (3.70) undergraduate grade point average and a competitive LSAT score. The program also requires a personal statement and two reference letters, and claims to use a holistic admissions approach, taking into account a variety of factors including work experience, prior education, and other exceptional circumstances.

According to the Faculty of Law LSAC page, the English-language common law program received 2637 applications in 2019, of which 320 were admitted; an admission rate of 12%. The French-language common law program, including the Programme de droit canadien, received 185 applications in 2019, of which 80 were admitted.

=== Civil law section ===
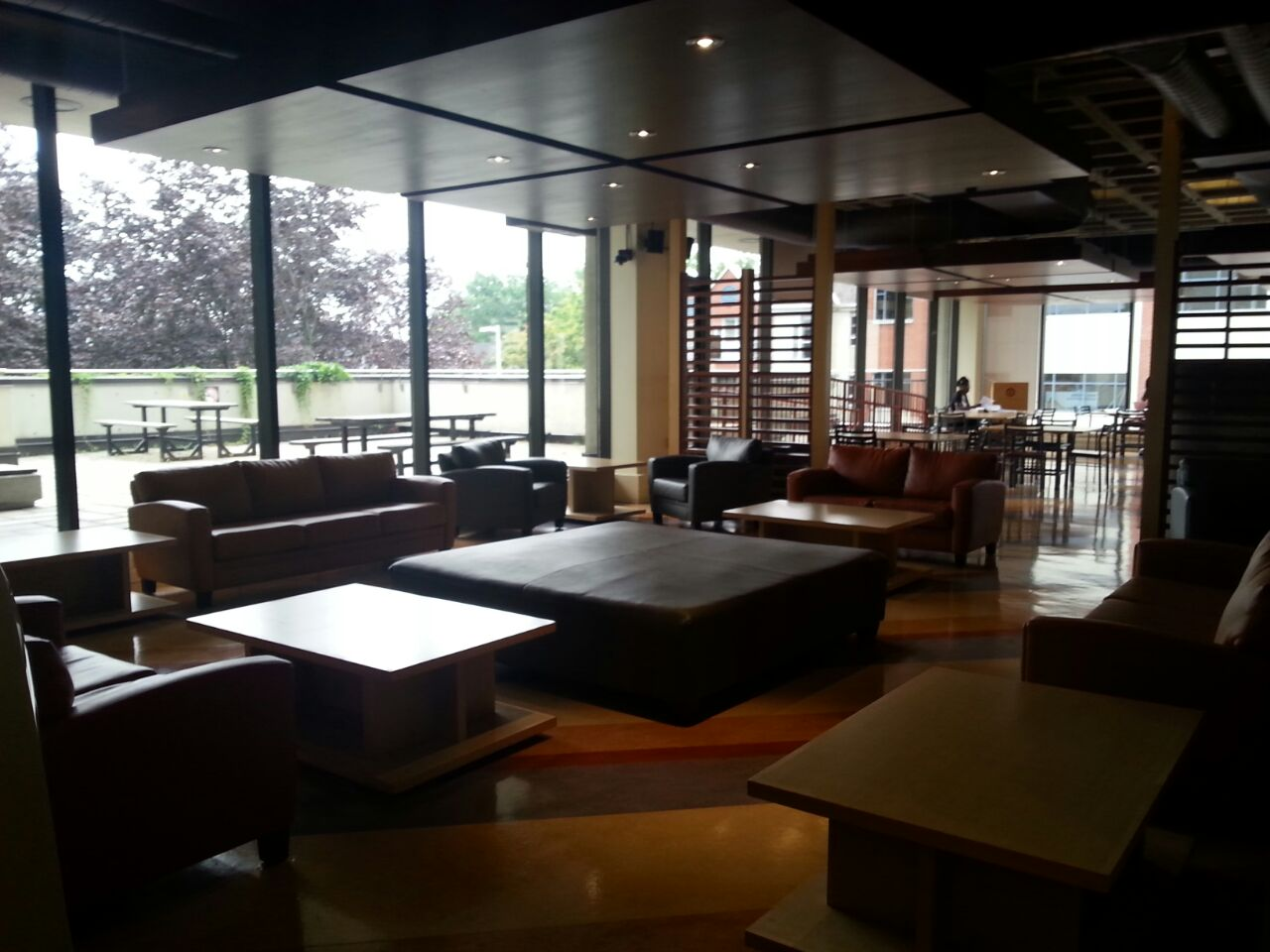
Tsampalieros Atrium, Fauteux Hall

In the Civil Law Section, which teaches the legal tradition practised in Quebec, applicants need only have obtained a Diploma of Collegial Studies (DEC) before applying. The Civil Law Section's requirements are generally considered to be less stringent than those of the Common Law Section, since applicants are normally assessed only based on the previous post-secondary grades they received in college or university. Nevertheless, a minimum A− (80%) average is now required for admission from university; students applying directly from CEGEP, however, face stricter requirements.

=== Language requirements ===
The language of instruction depends on the program: while the civil law program is instructed entirely in French, the common law program is available in either English or French, with students permitted to take classes in both languages if they wish. In compliance with university policy, all written work may be submitted in either language, with the exception of the French common law program, in which all written and oral work must be submitted in French.

== Academics ==
Graduates of the common law section receive the Juris Doctor (J.D.) degree, while civil law graduates receive the Licentiate in Law (LL.L.) degree. On May 3, 2010, the Senate of the university approved a motion to change the designation of the common law degree from LL.B. (Bachelor of Laws) to J.D. (Juris Doctor). The Faculty of Law equally offers Master of Laws (LL.M.) and Doctor of Laws (LL.D.) degrees in both sections. The faculty is unique among Canadian institutions in that it grants the LL.D. as its terminal research/professional degree, and not a Doctor of Philosophy (Ph.D.) in law or a Doctor of Juridical Science (S.J.D.). Most universities only grant the LL.D. honoris causa.

=== Joint programs ===
The following is a list of several joint programs offered by the University of Ottawa Faculty of Law:

- The bilingual Programme de droit canadien (PDC) allows only 18 to 20 students a year to simultaneously earn a J.D. and a LL.L. degree in three years.
- The National Program allows students in either common law or civil law to separately complete a degree in the other legal system in four years.
- The Dual J.D. program is a combined Canadian-American legal program offered in conjunction with either the Michigan State University College of Law or the Washington College of Law at American University; students obtain two degrees in four years.
- The J.D./MBA program is a combined law–business program enabling students to receive concurrent common law and business degrees in four years.
- The LL.L./MBA program enables students to receive concurrent civil law and business degrees in four years.
- The J.D./MA is a combined law–political science degree which enables students to receive a master's degree from Carleton University's Norman Paterson School of International Affairs, which they attend full-time for a year between their first and second years of legal education.
- The LL.L./DVM program allows students enrolled in the civil law section to receive a specialized degree in international development and globalization.
- The J.D./Sciences Politiques program allows students to enrol in common law from high school. It is a six-year program, with the first two years and the final year spent in Political Science and years three to five in Common Law.

== Tuition fees ==
Tuition at the University of Ottawa's Law School varies according to the program being studied. Students enrolled in the civil law program pay the lowest fees, with the tuition rates 2012–2013 set at $8,833.46; this stands in contrast to the common law program, where annual tuition rates for 2014–2015 are $16,772.40. Students in the National Program pay $10,077.70 for their extra year of study. Students enrolled in the Dual J.D. program with an American law school pay what the University of Ottawa has termed "regular Canadian law student rates during the entire program," meaning the regular common law tuition fees at the school.

== Reputation ==
University rankings

World rankings

Canadian rankings

The Faculty of Law is well known for its successful mooting program and track record of international successes. The moot team has won the Vis Moot, the Oxford Intellectual Property Moot, and various other competitions, outperforming rival schools like Harvard Law School in many cases.

Offerings in areas of practice including environmental law, health law, criminal law, tax law, and technology law have become highly developed, with diverse practical and academic offerings being made available to students in those areas. The school is also known for its strong focus on public-interest law. More recently, there have been efforts to bolster offerings in business and corporate law with the creation of the new Business Law Clinic.

Maclean's magazine last released its annual law school ranking on September 19, 2013, and has not released any rankings for law schools since then. In that evaluation, Ottawa's common law program was ranked 10th overall in Canada, scoring particularly well (3rd overall) in the category for Supreme Court clerkships. The civil law section was ranked 3rd in Canada among other civil law schools (the majority being in the province of Québec). In 2019, the law school was ranked 5th in Canada according to University Magazine.

It was ranked in Times Higher Education 2024 ranking as the 58th best law school in the world and consequently the 4th best law school in Canada.

== Notable faculty ==
- Constance Backhouse, Canadian legal scholar and historian, University Research Chair and President of the American Society of Legal History
- Donald Malcolm McRae, legal scholar
- David Paciocco, legal scholar, justice of the Court of Appeal for Ontario
- Benoît Pelletier CM OQ, constitutional legal scholar and former cabinet minister in the Quebec government
- Amir Attaran, legal scholar, litigator, cell biologist and immunologist, works on environment and health law, racial equality advocate
- Michael Geist, world-renowned expert on privacy, Canada Research Chair in Internet and E-Commerce Law at the University of Ottawa
- Vern Krishna, scholar, tax expert
- Tracey Lindberg, award-winning writer, scholar, lawyer and Indigenous Rights activist
- Allan Rock PC CM OOnt KC, former president of University of Ottawa, politician and diplomat.

== Notable alumni ==
=== Justices of the Supreme Court of Canada ===
- Louise Arbour, former UN High Commissioner for Human Rights, former puisne justice of the Supreme Court of Canada, and former Chief Prosecutor of the International Criminal Tribunals for the former Yugoslavia and Rwanda (LL.M '71 in the Civil Law Section)
- Michel Bastarache, former puisne justice of the Supreme Court of Canada (LL.B '78)
- Louise Charron, former puisne justice of the Supreme Court of Canada (LL.B '75)
- Michelle O’Bonsawin, current puisne justice of the Supreme Court of Canada (LL.B '98)
- Richard Wagner, current Chief Justice of Canada (LL.L '79)

=== Politicians ===
- Brooks Arcand-Paul, politician, member of the Legislative Assembly of Alberta (J.D. '16)
- Maxime Bernier, politician, former Minister of Foreign Affairs and current Leader of the People's Party of Canada (LL.L '88)
- Martin Cauchon, politician and former Member of Parliament (MP) for the Liberal Party of Canada and former federal Cabinet minister as Minister of Justice (LL.L '84)
- Bob Chiarelli, former mayor of Ottawa (LL.B '67)
- Bernadette Clement, former mayor of Cornwall and current Senator representing Ontario (LL.L '87 / LL.B '88)
- Howard Hampton, politician and former leader of the Ontario New Democratic Party (LL.B '83)
- Ahmed Hussen, current Minister of Immigration, Refugees, and Citizenship (J.D. '11)
- Jean-Paul L'Allier, politician and longtime mayor of Quebec City, from 1989 to 2005 (LL.L '62)
- Jean Lapierre, politician and former MP for both the Liberal and Bloc Québécois parties, and former Cabinet minister (LL.L '78)
- John Manley, politician and former MP for the Liberal Party and former federal Cabinet minister (LL.B '76)
- Madeleine Meilleur, member of the Legislative Assembly of Ontario and Attorney General of Ontario (LL.L)
- Réal Ménard, politician, gay rights activist, former member of the Canadian House of Commons for the Quebec riding of Hochelaga (LL.L '07)
- Dalton McGuinty, politician and former premier of Ontario (LL.B '81)
- David McGuinty, politician and current Liberal MP for Ottawa South (LL.B '86)
- Yasir Naqvi, MPP for Ottawa Centre and former president of Liberal Party of Ontario
- Paul Okalik, politician and Premier of Nunavut and first Inuktitut-speaking person to be called to the Bar of that territory (LL.B '97)
- Annamie Paul, former leader of the Green Party of Canada (LL.B '95)
- Gil Rémillard, politician and law professor (LL.L '68)
- Allan Rock, politician and former MP for the Liberal Party, former federal Cabinet minister, former Canadian Ambassador to the United Nations, and president emeritus of the University of Ottawa (LL.B '71)
- Gérald Tremblay, politician and former mayor of Montreal, Quebec, Canada's second-largest city (LL.L '69)
- Stephanie Vallee, member of the National Assembly of Quebec and Minister of Justice (Quebec) (LL.L '93)

=== Judges ===
- Paul Crampton, Chief Justice of the Federal Court (Canada) (LL.B '85)
- Denise Korpan, Justice of the Ontario Superior Court of Justice, Family Court Branch (LL.B '79)
- Gerald Lebovits, New York City Civil Court judge, law professor at Columbia Law School, Fordham University School of Law & NYU School of Law (LL.L '79)
- Lise Maisonneuve, Chief Justice of the Ontario Court of Justice (LL.B '89)
- Colin McKinnon, K.C., Justice of the Ontario Superior Court of Justice (LL.B '68)
- Janet. E Mills, Justice of the Ontario Superior Court of Justice (LL.B' 91)
- Marc Noël, Chief Justice of the Federal Court of Appeal (Canada) (LL.L '74; LL.B '75)
- Simon Noël, Justice of the Federal Court (Canada) (LL.L ‘74)
- Paul Rouleau, Justice of the Court of Appeal for Ontario (LL.B '77)
- Gabrielle St-Hilaire, Chief justice of the Tax Court of Canada (LL.B '91)
- Jodie-Lynn Waddilove, Justice of the Ontario Court of Justice (LL.B '03)

=== Academics ===
- Céline Lévesque, Dean of the Civil Law section of the University of Ottawa Faculty of Law from 2014 to 2019 (LL.L '90)
- Camille A. Nelson, Academic, Dean of American University Washington College of Law (LL.B '94)
- Dr. Lorna A. Turnbull, Dean of University of Manitoba Faculty of Law (LL. B '89)

=== Lawyers ===
- Mark Bourrie, Canadian author and lawyer
- France Chrétien Desmarais, a Canadian lawyer and businesswoman. Daughter of former prime minister Jean Chrétien, and married to André Desmarais, president of the Montreal-based Power Corporation of Canada (LL.L.)
- Faisal Kutty, lawyer, writer, human rights activist and academic teaching at Osgoode Hall Law School and at Valparaiso University (LL.B '94)
- André Marin, former Crown Attorney, law professor, Director of Ontario's S.I.U. and Canadian Armed Forces Ombudsman. Current Ontario Ombudsman (LL.L '88; LL.B '89)
- Maureen McTeer, author, lawyer and wife of former prime minister Joe Clark (LL.B '76)
- Hugh Verrier, attorney and the chairman of White & Case LLP and director of the firm's strategy and operations around the world (LL.B '81)

=== Others ===
- Peter Chiarelli, President of Hockey Operations and General Manager of the NHL's Edmonton Oilers (LL.B '91)
- Murray Costello, NHL hockey player, President of Hockey Canada, inducted into the Hockey Hall of Fame, the IIHF Hall of Fame, Canada's Sports Hall of Fame, and is an Officer of the Order of Canada, and a recipient of the Order of Hockey in Canada.
- Mario Dion, Parliament of Canada, Conflict of Interest and Ethics Commissioner (LL.L '79)
- William J.S. Elliott, former Commissioner of the Royal Canadian Mounted Police (LL.B '79)
- Mitch Garber, Canadian business executive, CEO of Caesars Acquisition Company, Caesars Interactive Entertainment, the World Series of Poker, and Chairman of Cirque du Soleil (LL.L '89)
- Kevin Gilmore, Executive Vice President and Chief Operating Officer of the NHL's Montreal Canadiens (LL.L '86; LL.B '87)
- Mehdi Hakimi, Executive Director of the Rule of Law Program and Lecturer in Law at Stanford Law School (J.D.)
- Marc Mayrand, civil servant, former Superintendent of Bankruptcy and former Chief Electoral Officer of Elections Canada (LL.L '76)
- Brian Ludlow, Canadian entrepreneur, Chief Executive Officer of Creative Art Partners (J.D. '11)

== See also ==
- List of law schools in Canada
- University of Ottawa
