= 1993 reasons of the Supreme Court of Canada =

The list below consists of the reasons delivered from the bench by the Supreme Court of Canada during 1993. This list, however, does not include decisions on motions.

== Reasons ==
Delivered the Court's reason
Joined the Court's reason
Filed a concurrence
Joined a concurrence
Filed a dissent
Joined a dissent
Filed a concurrence/dissent
Joined a concurrence/dissent
Did not participate in the judgment
Did not participate in the final disposition of the judgment
Not a member of the Court at the time of hearing or delivering
- Decisions that do not note a Justice delivering the Court's reason are per coram.
- Multiple concurrences and dissents within a case are numbered, with joining votes numbered accordingly. Justices occasionally join multiple reasons in a single case; each vote is subdivided accordingly.
- Multiple unnumbered reasons are jointly written or delivered.
- Decisions that are given orally from the bench are denoted by a "V"; per coram decisions delivered orally from the bench only note a "V" on the most senior justice on the panel.
- An asterisk ( * ) in the Court's opinion denotes that it was only a majority in part or a plurality.

Case name	Argued	Decided	Lamer	La Forest	L'Heureux-Dubé	Sopinka	Gonthier	Cory	McLachlin	Iacobucci	Major
BG Checo International Ltd v British Columbia Hydro and Power Authority, [1993] 1 SCR 12	January 28, 1992	January 21, 1993									
Queen v Cognos Inc, [1993] 1 SCR 87	January 29, 1992	January 21, 1993									
R v Cooper, [1993] 1 SCR 146	October 6, 1992	January 21, 1993									
Hongkong Bank of Canada v Wheeler Holdings Ltd, [1993] 1 SCR 167	February 4, 1992	January 21, 1993									
R v MacKenzie, [1993] 1 SCR 212	April 3, 1992	January 21, 1993									
Reid Crowther & Partners Ltd v Simcoe & Erie General Insurance Co, [1993] 1 SCR 252	October 13, 1992	January 21, 1993									
Caisse populaire de Maniwaki v Giroux, [1993] 1 SCR 282	October 13, 1992	January 21, 1993									
Engel v Salyn, [1993] 1 SCR 306	October 14, 1992	January 21, 1993									
New Brunswick Broadcasting Co v Nova Scotia (Speaker of the House of Assembly), [1993] 1 SCR 319	March 2, 3, 1992	January 21, 1993									
Baron v Canada, [1993] 1 SCR 416	February 6, 1992	January 21, 1993									
R v Pouliot, [1993] 1 SCR 456	February 1, 1993	February 1, 1993									
R v Honish, [1993] 1 SCR 458	February 2, 1993	February 2, 1993									
R v Jones, [1993] 1 SCR 460	February 2, 1993	February 2, 1993									
R v Morgentaler, [1993] 1 SCR 462	February 2, 1993	February 2, 1993									
R v Pitt, [1993] 1 SCR 466	February 22, 1993	February 22, 1993									
Case name	Argued	Decided	Lamer	La Forest	L'Heureux-Dubé	Sopinka	Gonthier	Cory	McLachlin	Iacobucci	Major
R v Alkerton, [1993] 1 SCR 468	February 22, 1993	February 22, 1993									
R v P (J), [1993] 1 SCR 469	February 24, 1993	February 24, 1993									
Université du Québec à Trois-Rivières v Larocque, [1993] 1 SCR 471	November 30, 1992	February 25, 1993									
The Rhône v The Peter AB Widener, [1993] 1 SCR 497	May 26, 1992	February 25, 1993									
Canada (AG) v Mossop, [1993] 1 SCR 554	June 3, 1992	February 25, 1993									
R v Sharma, [1993] 1 SCR 650	April 28, 1992	February 25, 1993									
R v Greenbaum, [1993] 1 SCR 674	December 4;, 1992	February 25, 1993									
R v B (FF), [1993] 1 SCR 697	October 5, 1992	February 25, 1993									
R v B (KG), [1993] 1 SCR 740	October 8, 1992	February 25, 1993									
R v Thomas, [1993] 1 SCR 835	February 26, 1993	February 26, 1993									
R v Macooh, [1993] 2 SCR 802	February 26, 1993	June 30, 1993									
R v P (VL), [1993] 1 SCR 837	March 3, 1993	March 3, 1993									
Reference Re Public Schools Act (Man), s 79(3), (4) and (7), [1993] 1 SCR 839	December 3, 1992	March 4, 1993									
R v Hundal, [1993] 1 SCR 867	January 30, 1992	March 11, 1993									
Westar Mining Ltd (Re), [1993] 1 SCR 890	March 1, 1993	March 18, 1993									
Case name	Argued	Decided	Lamer	La Forest	L'Heureux-Dubé	Sopinka	Gonthier	Cory	McLachlin	Iacobucci	Major
R v Douglas; R v Myers, [1993] 1 SCR 893	March 23, 1993	March 23, 1993									
Sie-Mac Pipeline Contractors Ltd v MNR, [1993] 1 SCR 895	March 24, 1993	March 24, 1993									
R v Finta, [1993] 1 SCR 1138	March 24, 1993	March 24, 1993									
Amchem Products Inc v British Columbia (Workers' Compensation Board), [1993] 1 SCR 897	May 25, 1992	March 25, 1993									
Canada (AG) v Public Service Alliance of Canada, [1993] 1 SCR 941	November 12, 1992	March 25, 1993									
Peter v Beblow, [1993] 1 SCR 980	November 12, 1992	March 25, 1993									
Barrette v Crabtree Estate, [1993] 1 SCR 1027	March 25, 1993	December 1, 1992									
Dehghani v Canada (Minister of Employment and Immigration), [1993] 1 SCR 1053	December 2, 1992	March 24, 1993									
Finlay v Canada (Minister of Finance), [1993] 1 SCR 1080	March 23, 1992 rehearing: January 28, 1993	March 25, 1993									
R v Schiewe, [1993] 1 SCR 1134	March 26, 1993	March 26, 1993									
R v Steeves, [1993] 1 SCR 1136	March 31, 1993	March 31, 1993									
R v Goncalves, [1993] 2 SCR 3	April 2, 1993	April 2, 1993									
R v Théroux, [1993] 2 SCR 5	November 3, 1992	April 8, 1993									
R v Zlatic, [1993] 2 SCR 29	April 8, 1993	November 6, 1992									
R v Imbeault, [1993] 2 SCR 51	March 29, 1993	April 8, 1993									
Case name	Argued	Decided	Lamer	La Forest	L'Heureux-Dubé	Sopinka	Gonthier	Cory	McLachlin	Iacobucci	Major
Kourtessis v MNR, [1993] 2 SCR 53	February 6, 1992	April 22, 1993									
Ciarlariello v Schacter, [1993] 2 SCR 119	November 30, 1992	April 22, 1993									
Cunningham v Canada, [1993] 2 SCR 143	January 29, 1993	April 22, 1993									
R v Hawkins, [1993] 2 SCR 157	April 28, 1993	April 28, 1993									
Hall v Hebert, [1993] 2 SCR 159	October 6, 1992	April 29, 1993									
R v C (R), [1993] 2 SCR 226	April 29, 1993	April 29, 1993									
R v Slaney, [1993] 2 SCR 228	April 30, 1993	April 30, 1993									
Dayco (Canada) Ltd v CAW-Canada, [1993] 2 SCR 230	May 7, 1992	May 6, 1993									
R v Osolin, [1993] 2 SCR 313	May 6, 1993	May 6, 1993									
United Brotherhood of Carpenters and Joiners of America, Local 579 v Bradco Construction Ltd, [1993] 2 SCR 316	October 16, 1992	May 19, 1993									
University of British Columbia v Berg, [1993] 2 SCR 353	January 27, 1993	May 19, 1993									
R v Hasselwander, [1993] 2 SCR 398	February 5, 1993	May 19, 1993									
R v M (JJ), [1993] 2 SCR 421	February 5, 1993	May 19, 1993									
Sauvé v Canada (AG), [1993] 2 SCR 438	May 27, 1993	May 27, 1993									
R v D (A), [1993] 2 SCR 441	June 1, 1993	June 1, 1993									
Case name	Argued	Decided	Lamer	La Forest	L'Heureux-Dubé	Sopinka	Gonthier	Cory	McLachlin	Iacobucci	Major
Artell Developments Ltd v 677950 Ontario Ltd, [1993] 2 SCR 443	June 4, 1993	June 4, 1993									
R v Thornton, [1993] 2 SCR 445	June 4, 1993	June 4, 1993									
R v Clutterbuck, [1993] 2 SCR 447	June 8, 1993	June 8, 1993									
Westar Mining Ltd (Re), [1993] 2 SCR 448	June 8, 1993	June 8, 1993									
R v Egger, [1993] 2 SCR 451	October 9, 1992	June 10, 1993									
R v Aalders, [1993] 2 SCR 482	March 3, 1993	June 10, 1993									
Reference Re Education Act (Que), [1993] 2 SCR 511	December 7, 8, 9, 10 and 11, 1992	June 17, 1993									
R v Bevan, [1993] 2 SCR 599	March 5, 1993	June 17, 1993									
R v Evans, [1993] 2 SCR 629	March 22, 1993	June 17, 1993									
R v Erickson, [1993] 2 SCR 649	June 17, 1993	June 17, 1993									
Flieger v New Brunswick, [1993] 2 SCR 651	April 26, 1993	June 30, 1993									
Canada (AG) v Ward, [1993] 2 SCR 689	March 25, 1992	June 30, 1993									
Domtar Inc v Quebec (Commission d'appel en matière de lésions professionnelles), [1993] 2 SCR 756	April 1, 1993	June 30, 1993									
Saint-Basile, Village Sud (Corporation municipale de) v Ciment Québec Inc, [1993] 2 SCR 823	February 23, 1993	July 15, 1993									
R v V (KB), [1993] 2 SCR 857	June 16, 1993	July 15, 1993									
Case name	Argued	Decided	Lamer	La Forest	L'Heureux-Dubé	Sopinka	Gonthier	Cory	McLachlin	Iacobucci	Major
R v Gallagher, [1993] 2 SCR 861	March 1, 1993	August 12, 1993									
R v Frazer, [1993] 2 SCR 866	March 1, 1993	August 12, 1993									
Weatherall v Canada (AG), [1993] 2 SCR 872	March 25, 1993	August 12, 1993									
R v Potvin, [1993] 2 SCR 880	June 7, 1993	August 12, 1993									
R v Brown, [1993] 2 SCR 918	June 18, 1993	August 12, 1993									
R v Tremblay, [1993] 2 SCR 932	February 23, 1993	September 2, 1993									
R v Tortone, [1993] 2 SCR 973	April 28, 1993	September 2, 1993									
Haig v Canada (Chief Electoral Officer), [1993] 2 SCR 995	March 4, 1993	September 2, 1993									
Murphy v Welsh; Stoddard v Watson, [1993] 2 SCR 1069	May 31, 1993	September 2, 1993									
Ramsden v Peterborough (City of), [1993] 2 SCR 1084	June 1, 1993	September 2, 1993									
R v Creighton, [1993] 3 SCR 3	February 3, 1993	September 9, 1993									
R v Gosset, [1993] 3 SCR 76	May 1, 1993	September 9, 1993									
R v Finlay, [1993] 3 SCR 103	October 15, 1993	September 9, 1993									
R v Naglik, [1993] 3 SCR 122	April 5, 1993	September 9, 1993									
R v E (AW), [1993] 3 SCR 155	January 29, 1993	September 9, 1993									
Case name	Argued	Decided	Lamer	La Forest	L'Heureux-Dubé	Sopinka	Gonthier	Cory	McLachlin	Iacobucci	Major
Auto Concrete Curb Ltd v South Nation River Conservation Authority, [1993] 3 SCR 201	June 14, 1993	September 9, 1993									
Edgeworth Construction Ltd v ND Lea & Associates Ltd, [1993] 3 SCR 206	June 14, 1993	September 30, 1993									
R v Grant, [1993] 3 SCR 223	April 2, 1993	September 30, 1993									
R v Wiley, [1993] 3 SCR 263	November 5, 1992	September 30, 1993									
R v Plant, [1993] 3 SCR 281	November 5, 1992	September 30, 1993f									
R v Harbottle, [1993] 3 SCR 306	May 25, 1993	September 30, 1993									
Ontario Hydro v Ontario (Labour Relations Board), [1993] 3 SCR 327	November 9, 1992	September 30, 1993									
Slattery (Trustee of) v Slattery, [1993] 3 SCR 430	March 29, 1993	September 30, 1993									
R v Morgentaler, [1993] 3 SCR 463	February 4, 1993	September 30, 1993									
Rodriguez v British Columbia (AG), [1993] 3 SCR 519	May 20, 1993	September 30, 1993									
National Party of Canada v Canadian Broadcasting Corp, [1993] 3 SCR 651	October 4, 1993	October 4, 1993									
R v Price, [1993] 3 SCR 633	October 5, 1993	October 5, 1993									
R v Smith, [1993] 3 SCR 635	October 6, 1993	October 6, 1993									
R v Profit, [1993] 3 SCR 637	October 7, 1993	October 7, 1993									
R v Côté, [1993] 3 SCR 639	October 7, 1993	October 7, 1993									
Case name	Argued	Decided	Lamer	La Forest	L'Heureux-Dubé	Sopinka	Gonthier	Cory	McLachlin	Iacobucci	Major
R v Leduc, [1993] 3 SCR 641	October 8, 1993	October 8, 1993									
R v B (JG), [1993] 3 SCR 643	October 8, 1993	October 8, 1993									
R v Gaetz, [1993] 3 SCR 645	October 12, 1993	October 12, 1993									
R v Yorke, [1993] 3 SCR 647	October 15, 1993	October 15, 1993									
R v Ruiz, [1993] 3 SCR 649	October 15, 1993	October 15, 1993									
R v Evans, [1993] 3 SCR 653	March 24, 1993	October 21, 1993									
Hy and Zel's Inc v Ontario (AG); Paul Magder Furs Ltd v Ontario (AG), [1993] 3 SCR 675	February 25, 1993	October 21, 1993									
Canada Labour Relations Board v Québecair, [1993] 3 SCR 724											
R v Dersch, [1993] 3 SCR 768	March 30, 1993	October 21, 1993									
Air Canada v M & L Travel Ltd, [1993] 3 SCR 787	April 26, 1993	October 21, 1993									
Young v Young, [1993] 4 SCR 3	January 25, 26, 1993	October 21, 1993									
P (D) v S (C), [1993] 4 SCR 141	January 25, 26, 1993	October 21, 1993									
R v Felawka, [1993] 4 SCR 199	October 21, 1993	April 1, 1993									
R v Marquard, [1993] 4 SCR 223	April 29, 1993	October 21, 1993									
R v Mills, [1993] 4 SCR 277	November 2, 1993	November 2, 1993									
Case name	Argued	Decided	Lamer	La Forest	L'Heureux-Dubé	Sopinka	Gonthier	Cory	McLachlin	Iacobucci	Major
Granville Savings and Mortgage Corp v Slevin, [1993] 4 SCR 279	November 2, 1993	November 2, 1993									
R v Nuosci, [1993] 4 SCR 283	November 3, 1993	November 3, 1993									
Friedberg v Canada, [1993] 4 SCR 285	November 5, 1993	November 5, 1993									
R v Brassard, [1993] 4 SCR 287	November 5, 1993	November 5, 1993									
Hunt v T&N plc, [1993] 4 SCR 289	October 7, 1992	November 18, 1993									
R v Litchfield, [1993] 4 SCR 333	June 7, 1993	November 18, 1993									
Allard Contractors Ltd v Coquitlam (District of), [1993] 4 SCR 371	May 26, 1993	November 18, 1993									
R v L (DO), [1993] 4 SCR 419	June 15, 1993	November 18, 1993									
R v Levogiannis, [1993] 4 SCR 475	June 15, 1993	November 18, 1993									
United States of America v Doyer, [1993] 4 SCR 497	November 29, 1993	November 29, 1993									
R v Moran, [1993] 4 SCR 499	November 29, 1993	November 29, 1993									
R v Rowbotham; R v Roblin, [1993] 4 SCR 834	December 8, 1993	December 8, 1993									
R v McAnespie, [1993] 4 SCR 501	December 10, 1993	December 10, 1993									
R v I (LR) and T (E), [1993] 4 SCR 504	March 31, 1993	December 16, 1993									
R v Tapaquon, [1993] 4 SCR 535	May 25, 1993	December 16, 1993									
Case name	Argued	Decided	Lamer	La Forest	L'Heureux-Dubé	Sopinka	Gonthier	Cory	McLachlin	Iacobucci	Major
R v Jackson, [1993] 4 SCR 573	June 3, 1993	December 16, 1993									
R v Osolin, [1993] 4 SCR 595	June 17, 1993	December 16, 1993									
Symes v Canada, [1993] 4 SCR 695	March 2, 1993	December 16, 1993									
