= Paint (band) =

Canadian indie rock band

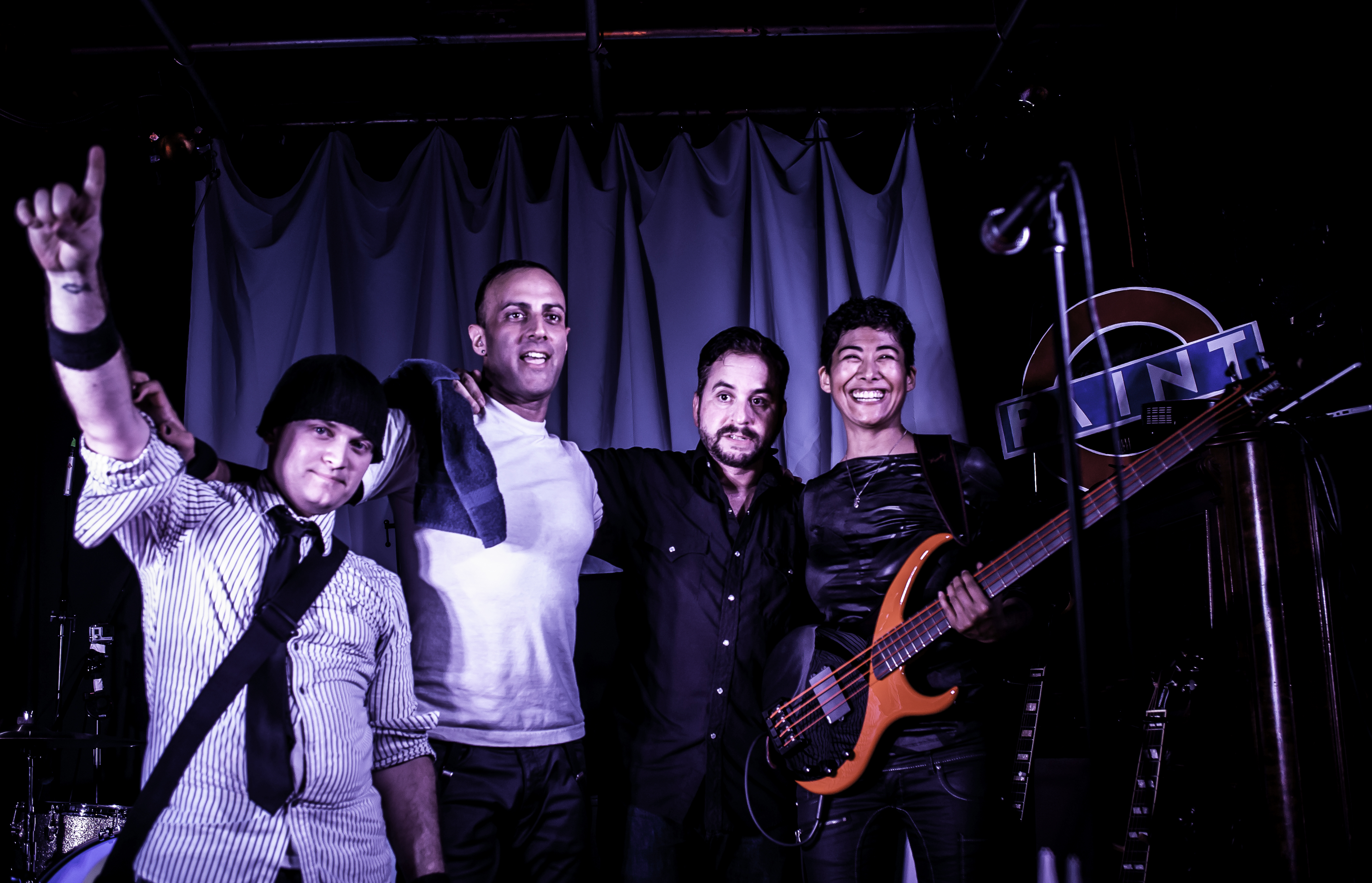
- Paint at The Cameron House, Toronto, 2014

Background information
- Origin: Vancouver, British Columbia, Canada
- Genres: Alternative rock Indie rock Post-Britpop
- Years active: 2001–2023
- Label: Fontana North
- Members: Robb Johannes; Jordan Shepherdson; Keiko Gutierrez; Devin Jannetta
- Past members: Nik Odermatt; Nathan Da Silva; Andre Dey; Mandy Dunbar; Marcus Warren; Jeff Logan; Matt Laforest; Paula McGlynn
- Website: www.paintband.com

Paint is a Canadian indie rock band from Toronto, Ontario. The group was unofficially formed 2001 in Vancouver, becoming its known incarnation by 2008. The band's line-up consists of Robb Johannes (lead vocals), Jordan Shepherdson (guitar, backing vocals), Keiko Gutierrez (bass), and Devin Jannetta (drums).

== History ==
=== Beginnings, Urban Folk Tales and Other Projects (2001–2007) ===
Neither Robb Johannes, nor anyone associated with Paint, has spoken publicly the band's early history or the unofficial release of Urban Folk Tales in 2004. The only reference ever made was an interview with Thunderbird Radio Hell on CiTR 101.9FM in Vancouver on 18 September 2008, when Matt Laforest said the band stop being a "funk, fusion, folk" project "The day I joined." An early version of the Paint song "Madonna" can be found on Urban Folk Tales—it would later be refined for release on Can You Hear Me?

=== Can You Hear Me? (2008–2010) ===
Recorded in Port Coquitlam, and released 11 August 2009 when the band was established in Toronto, Paint's debut album Can You Hear Me? was automatically praised as "5 STARS: in your face, but not overpowering, melodic but still harsh, well-crafted but not over-perfected... heartbreaking yet uplifting.... an underlying sense of sonic maturity and strong lyrical insight... well-developed and layered...retain(s) the attractive simplicity of a great rock album," as well as an "alt-rock relic spiritually scraping the '90s, done with so much audacity and seismic guitar crunch one can’t help but strap into their time machine... this Toronto quartet wisely keep the sound big, but the anthemic denouements concise."

In March 2010, Paint won the 102.1 The Edge "Indie Online" fan contest on the strength of the single "Strangers," upping their profile amongst the local and national independent music scene. Their performance at Edge Studios 27 March 2010 was called "Picture perfect" by curator Raina Douris.

In August 2014, a 5th anniversary deluxe reissue was released through the band's Bandcamp website, featuring five so-called "discs" of demos, live tracks and interviews, expanded artwork, and retrospective conversations between Robb Johannes, Matt Laforest, and Paula McGlynn.

=== Where We Are Today and Capsulated (2010–2012) ===
Documented in the film Where We Were in April, Robb Johannes moved to Kitchener/Waterloo, where the Paint went into the studio with Ian Smith. Previously, Johannes and Smith had collaborated on composing two songs: "Girl in a Frame," and "Boomerang"—the former of which secured the band international distribution through Fontana North.

On the recording process, Johannes stated that, "[Smith] created this environment that was so friendly and so comfortable that we didn't need to have a lot of conversations about what we wanted to achieve with the record, and instead just focused on how we could get there technically. I can't say I've [previously] had an experience like that."

Press for Where We Are Today amounted rather quickly as the band toured across Canada once again, calling the album "An exciting blend of catchy pop rock songs and stellar lyrics... undeniable brilliance," "full of flight and passion... crisp and confident," and "intelligent people making incredible music."

Although Johannes and Dey maintained a very public and unified image for Paint, tensions between Dunbar and the rest of the band, including producer Ian Smith, were made apparent in Where We Were in April, where Smith asks Dunbar to "play more for the track and less for the camera," and the subsequent tour for Where We Are Today ended on 1 October 2011, which would be the last time Johannes, Dunbar, Warren, and Dey would play on stage together.

With the release of Where We Are Today, Paint undertook the task of producing a video album, making a music video for each song on the record. Johannes' statement on the project:

The Video Album Project is a pretty ambitious undertaking. Radiohead inspired it – they attempted it with OK Computer but didn't see it through to the end. We're on a much smaller scale, which in many ways makes it entirely more possible. Video has become a much more accessible format now with YouTube, budget DV cameras, and an abundance of public domain footage (for example, "End of the Reel" and "In Disguise" were both done entirely with stock footage, the latter based on the 1936 cult classic Reefer Madness). Purists may argue the open landscape for anyone to upload videos is watering down its artistic merit as a format, and I tend to agree. But we're also making the best of a more accessible outlet that we as a band can be directly involved with. Four videos are done now, one is complete an in queue, and more will follow. We'll probably be releasing one every month or two months. It's a good way to stay relevant and active in between touring cycles.

The 10-video project would take until November 2013 to complete.

=== Line-up changes and touring (2012–2014) ===
At the end of the Where We'll Be 2011 Tour, Robb Johannes was seen on stage at Indie Week 2011 playing bass with Kevin Komatsu of The Joys on drums and Tim Dafoe of The Cheap Speakers on guitar. As the band embarked on a cross-Canada tour in March/April 2012, he published a note on the band's official blog, giving a vague explanation for why Paint was now composed of Johannes (vocals), session player Nathan Da Silva (guitar), and the rhythm section from Toronto band Shortwave; Nikolaus Odermatt (bass) and Devin Jannetta (drums):

I'm not one to talk bad about people publicly, and I don't believe in airing dirty laundry for public exploitation. All I can say is the we put out a new record and money got ain the way. Money was taken from the band account without the usual procedures of approval; money that was contractually-obliged was breached and people were stuck with debts; and money was owed between people who weren't willing to make concessions or look at the big picture. Inexperience and insecurities came in as well, surely. It's the 2000s; making money as an independent band is a tough gig. What's more important is that the band still exists and is stronger than ever. Sometimes shaking things up is the only way to really survive, and I'm grateful to still have a place to call home musically. Andre Dey and I do keep regular contact though. After all we've been through, he'll always be a brother and friend.

In November 2012, Paint performed a weekly residency at C'est What? in Toronto, revealing newly written material each week, to the point of playing almost an entire set's worth of brand new and unreleased material. Audio from the closing night (27 November) was made available on the band's SoundCloud on 17 December 2012, revealing a sound more personal in its lyrical content and introducing a synthesizer and orchestration tracks into the arsenal.

By 2013, Ottawa native Jordan Shepherdson had taken over permanent guitar duties after nearly two years of temporary help, and Paint announced in its July 2013 newsletter that Nik Odermatt was leaving the band to start a family and had been replaced by Jenna Strautman

After a handful of shows with Strautman in the summer of 2013, Paint joined up with Toronto director/producer R. Stephenson Price (of music blog/series The Indie Machine) to film a 6-minute narrative heist film music video for their single "Boomerang" (released 22 November). In October, the band reprised their month-long weekly residency spot at C'est What? to much acclaim, alongside an IndieGogo fundraising campaign to propel the band's next series of recording sessions following the release of the Capsulated (Music Videos) DVD compilation on 26 November 2013.

After being awarded a FACTOR grant in the spring of 2014, and securing additional funding through fans via IndieGogo, the band members prepared to hit the studio to record material for a new four-song EP – Based on Truth and Lies – which was set to be accompanied by a 16-minute visual accompaniment film tentatively titled 11:11 – again directed/produced by R. Stephenson Price.

By this time, Keiko Gutierrez had joined Paint on bass and solidified the band lineup for the first time since 2011.

=== Based on Truth and Lies / 11:11 / (disPLAY) (2014–2017) ===
After initial location scouting and pre-production throughout the winter of 2013 and into spring 2014, Paint soon jumped full-on into the movie business alongside Price – with Johannes taking a much more active role in the filmmaking process following "Boomerang". Casting actor and model, Zac Ché as the protagonist of 11:11, Trevor, and re-teaming with "Boomerang" female lead Victoria Urquhart, Johannes and Price soon discovered the meager 16-minute visual film project had begun to take on a life of its own, and by the fall of 2014 had ballooned to a nearly hour-long experimental sci-fi film.

Meanwhile, in August, Paint re-entered the studio with producer Ian Smith to record the Based on Truth and Lies EP, which had now reversed roles and would serve as the soundtrack to 11:11, rather than 11:11 be merely the visuals to the songs.

In October, the band sold out Toronto venue The Cameron House to record a 90-minute concert DVD entitled (disPLAY), which is set for release sometime in 2016, making it the second project in one calendar year to receive FACTOR funding. Through the fall and into the spring of 2015, pickup shots and effects work on the film continued until the final EP tracks had returned from mastering – again with Joe Lambert at the helm. Johannes and Price then pulled the individual instrumentation from each song and re-orchestrated the pieces into entirely new soundscapes for the scoring of the film.

Ché and Urquhart rejoined the production in April to record voiceovers for the now significantly more robust 11:11, which now drew from the format of The Who's Quadrophenia as a film presenting an album of music, and from the filmic collaborations of U2 and Anton Corbijn. Narratively, Price had taken Johannes' 16-page narrative and twisted it into a strange David Lynch/David Cronenberg sci-fi drama, but with strong literary ties to Lewis Carroll's Alice in Wonderland; while Johannes claims to never watch psychological or horror films, his thematic and character input was invaluable in molding the final product into the strange take on reality and consciousness that resulted in 11:11.

Paint held a release show for Based on Truth and Lies at The Great Hall in Toronto on 29 May 2015 and screened a teaser for 11:11 as a stage projection alongside the performance – an evening which also featured a special guest appearance by Canadian astronaut/musician Chris Hadfield alongside headlining rock band Trapper, featuring Emm Gryner (formerly of David Bowie's band). 11:11 soon made its exclusive online debut through video streaming service VHX in June ahead of its impending theatrical premiere on 11 September 2015 – an independent release set to coincide with the 40th Toronto International Film Festival.

=== Opening the vaults and closing shop (2018–present) ===
In 2018, the band marked its 10-year anniversary with an archives project, digging up the instrumental score for 11:11 entitled Chapter 11, and a compilation of unreleased material, Set The Children Free: The Lost Demos 2011 - 2018, followed by The Book of Joe, a 316-page photo e-book documenting the band's on stage history with photographer Joe Mac. In 2021, continuing to dig through the archives, an unreleased 2007 recording of a single, "Life," was released.

Announcing their closing shop on creating new music and live performance in 2023, in line with their 15th anniversary, Paint released a meticulously-compiled "15th anniversary" special editions of Can You Hear Me? and Where We Are Today, each featuring 45 tracks of demos, live recordings, radio performances, and retrospective interviews, along with extensive liner notes and reimagined artwork. The band continues to maintain their online community and mine the vaults for ongoing archival projects "in honour of those who've supported us over the years and years."

== Activism and causes ==
=== Postering case ===
A well-documented court case took place in 2011 with Johannes and the management of Toronto's C'est What? venue against mayor Rob Ford's anti-postering bylaws. Johannes presented the Ramsden v. Peterborough (City) [1993] 2 S.C.R. 1084 decision from the Supreme Court of Canada, where the Court struck down a bylaw prohibiting all postering on public property on the grounds that it violated freedom of expression under section 2(b) of the Canadian Charter of Rights and Freedoms. After having the charges thrown out, Johannes issued a public statement on the victory:

Bans on postering represent an attack on the arts, especially in times of political conservatism when arts can be seen as subversive. 85% of the 413 infractions stemming from anti-postering in Montreal in 2009 were against the cultural industries. Posters are an accessible and affordable form of advertising for locally-targeted events in an oversaturated internet market. By-laws against postering are simply creating barriers for artists of a certain income demographic to get their messages out. Unless one has the resources to advertise in mainstream media, which is often controlled by certain interests, or own property and put up a big billboard, ideas and expressions are limited. The concept of "public space" contains the assumption that people freely express themselves as permitted under s.2(b) of the Charter....In Toronto's case, shy of banding together to file a constitutional challenge (which I would say isn't entirely outside the realm of possibility) the onus sadly is placed on the backs of artists to stand up for their rights. Poster and promote as you would, and if fines are issued, do not pay them. Go to court. Use the above case law to argue your points. And drop me a line, I'd be happy to help.

The court win was celebrated by a headlining show at C'est What? on 8 December 2011, where Johannes also sang tributes to Jim Morrison and John Lennon in homage to the former's birth and the latter's death. During the set, Johannes was famously photographed holding up an "I Hate Rob Ford" T-shirt passed to him from the audience.

=== Other causes ===
As the most vocal and public member of Paint, Johannes has championed many causes including vegetarianism, gun control, public housing (particularly in Vancouver's Downtown Eastside, and voting, amongst others.

=== 2014 Toronto Civic Election: Robb Not Ford Campaign ===
In addition to his social advocacy, Robb Johannes ran in the 2014 Toronto mayoral election under the moniker "Robb Not Ford" (a jab against outgoing mayor Rob Ford). Johannes placed 12th out of 65 candidates with a campaign budget of just $18, and was noted as winning early debates against Ford and other major candidates including former Toronto budget chief David Soknacki.

Johannes' closing statement on 20 October 2014 included the grassroots adage:

...if Toronto continues to see a system in which only career politicians, executives, lawyers, and other members of a socioeconomic status unattainable to the great 95% of us (as essential as the wealthy still are to the city), speak on behalf of communities without actually being part of them, we will not see change. But as a smaller step, we can hold our representatives accountable, and create the changes we need from the ground up.

== Members ==
=== Current ===
- Robb Johannes – lead vocals, guitar, programming (2008–2023)
- Jordan Shepherdson – guitar, backing vocals (2012–2023)
- Keiko Gutierrez – bass, backing vocals (2014–2023)
- Devin Jannetta – drums (2012–2023)

=== Former (abridged) ===
- Nikolaus Odermatt – bass, keyboards (2011-2012)
- Nathan Da Silva – guitar, backing vocals (2011-2012)
- Andre Dey – drums, backing vocals (2010-2011)
- Mandy Dunbar – guitar, backing vocals (2009-2011)
- Marcus Warren – bass (2009-2011)
- Jeff Logan – guitar (2009)
- Matt Laforest – drums (2008–2009)
- Paula McGlynn – guitar, vocals (2008–2009)

== Discography ==
=== Studio albums ===
- Where We Are Today (6 September 2011) [Fontana North, PWWAT11] #23 (!earshot)
- Can You Hear Me? (11 August 2009) [independent, PCYHM09] #20 (!earshot)
- Urban Folk Tales (29 May 2004) [independent, RSC12272] #9 (!earshot)

=== EPs ===
- "Life" (Unreleased 2007 Studio Recording)" (1 October 2021) [independent, PLS2021]
- Based on Truth and Lies (2 June 2015) [independent, PBOTAL15]

=== Live albums ===
- (disPLAY) (16 September 2016) [independent, PDISP16]

=== Compilation albums ===
- Where We Are Today (15th Anniversary Deluxe Edition (4 August 2023) [independent, PWWAT1523]
- Can You Hear Me? (15th Anniversary Deluxe Edition (4 August 2023) [independent, PCYHM1523]
- Set The Children Free: The Lost Demos 2011-2018 (2 November 2018) [independent, PSTCF18]
- Showcase International 2005 (21 September 2005), E3/Chromium Records (CHRO-SC2005-001), featuring the song "Open Your Eyes"

=== Film Scores ===
- Chapter 11: Original Score For The Film 11:11 (16 March 2018) [independent, PCH112018]

=== Singles ===
Date of Release	Title	Format	!earshot Peak	Album
27 July 2023	"End of the Reel (acoustic studio version)"	mp3	N/A	Where We Are Today (15th Anniversary Deluxe Edition)
14 March 2017	"A Stitch in Time"	mp3	N/A	(disPLAY)
17 January 2017	"It's Over (and Over)"	mp3	N/A	(disPLAY)
15 November 2016	"Take It or Leave It"	mp3	N/A	(disPLAY)
13 September 2016	"Electro" (Leave Me Unknown)"	mp3	N/A	(disPLAY)
22 January 2016	"Shattered Hearts"	mp3	N/A	Based on Truth and Lies
9 April 2013	"Home"	mp3	23	Where We Are Today
11 September 2012	"Gastown"	mp3	23	Where We Are Today
24 July 2012	"She Leaves"	mp3	23	Where We Are Today
8 May 2012	"In Disguise"	mp3	23	Where We Are Today
6 March 2012	"End of the Reel"	mp3	23	Where We Are Today
30 August 2011	"Girl in a Frame"	mp3	23	Where We Are Today
10 August 2010	"Madonna"	mp3	20	Can You Hear Me?
13 April 2010	"A Gentle Art"	mp3	20	Can You Hear Me?
8 December 2009	"Don't Blow Me Away"	mp3	20	Can You Hear Me?
19 May 2009	"Strangers"	mp3 // album preview	20	Can You Hear Me?
1 March 2007	"Life"	Online-only single exclusive to Myspace	N/A	N/A
29 May 2004	"The Open Road"	Download only	9	Urban Folk Tales

== Videography ==
=== Films ===
- (disPLAY) (16 September 2016) [independent, PDISP16]
- 11:11 (2 June 2015) [independent, P1111DVD15]

=== Compilations ===
- Capsulated (26 November 2013) [Independent, PCDVD13]
- Videos, etc. (2011) [Independent, PVEDVD11]

=== Documentaries ===
- (disASSEMBLED): The Making of (disPLAY) (20 September 2016)
- Story of the Moral of the Story: The Making of 11:11 (19 January 2016)
- The Making of Boomerang (17 November 2013)
- Where We Were in April (30 August 2011), [Independent, PWWWIADVD11]

== Bibliography ==
- The Book of Joe: A Collaboration Between The Rock 'n' Roll Band Paint and Photographer Joe Mac (22 September 2020), [independent, ISBN 9781777160920]
