= Harbottle (disambiguation) =

Harbottle is a village in Northumberland, England.

Harbottle may also refer to:

- Sir Harbottle Grimston, 1st Baronet (c.1569–1648), MP for Essex 1626 and 1628–1629
- Sir Harbottle Grimston, 2nd Baronet (1603–1685), English politician
- John Harbottle Sr. (1779–1830), English mariner, officer with the Butterworth Squadron
- Michael Harbottle (1917–1997), British army officer and peace campaigner
- Jeremiah Harbottle, character of deputy stationmaster in 1937 film Oh, Mr Porter!
- Elijah Harbottle, character of judge in the Sheridan Le Fanu short story "Mr. Justice Harbottle", collected in In a Glass Darkly (1872)

== See also ==
- Foss v Harbottle, 1843 English precedent on corporate law
- R. v. Harbottle, 1993 Canadian case
- Harbottle Castle, in Harbottle village
