= Rafuse =

Rafuse is a surname.

== List of people with the surname ==
- Denise Peterson-Rafuse, Canadian politician
- Earle Rafuse (1930–1998), Canadian politician
- Erin Rafuse (born 1988), Canadian sailor

== See also ==
- Central Trust Co v Rafuse
