= R v Hundal =

- Supreme Court of Canada

Hearing: January 30, 1992 Judgment: March 11, 1993
- Full case name: Surinder Hundal v Her Majesty The Queen
- Citations: [1993] 1 S.C.R. 867
- Ruling: Hundal's appeal was dismissed.

Court membership
- Chief Justice: Antonio Lamer; Puisne Justices: Gérard La Forest, Claire L'Heureux-Dubé, John Sopinka, Charles Gonthier, Peter Cory, Beverley McLachlin, William Stevenson, Frank Iacobucci

Reasons given
- Majority: Cory J., joined by L'Heureux-Dubé, Sopinka, Gonthier and Iacobucci JJ.
- Concurrence: McLachlin J., joined by Lamer C.J.
- Concurrence: La Forest J.
- Stevenson J. took no part in the consideration or decision of the case.

R v Hundal [1993] 1 S.C.R. 867, is one of several landmark Supreme Court of Canada cases where the court showed its first signs of moving away from the strict requirement for subjectively proven mens rea in criminal offences.

== Background ==
The accused, Mr. Hundal, was driving an overloaded dump truck above the speed limit through downtown Vancouver. When Mr. Hundal entered an intersection on a red light he collided with a car that had also just entered the intersection on a green light, killing the driver.

The accused claimed that he entered the intersection on a yellow and did not have time to stop. However, the trial judge rejected this based on the evidence of several eyewitnesses. Mr. Hundal was convicted of dangerous driving causing death under s.249(1) of the Criminal Code. His appeal to the British Columbia Court of Appeal was dismissed.

== Reasoning ==
Justice Peter Cory, writing for the majority, recognised that mens rea could be proven subjectively or objectively depending on the offence. The offence at issue should be assessed objectively within the context of all the surrounding events. "The trier of fact must be satisfied that the conduct amounted to a marked departure from the standard of care that a reasonable person would observe in the accused's situation." [emphasis added] On this modified objective standard it was found that Mr. Hundal was driving in a manner that was dangerous to public safety.

== Analysis ==
A truck driver negligently drove through a red light killing the driver of another car. The facts of the case are not important, only in that they invoke the Supreme Court to assess whether the charge of dangerous driving, found under sec. 249(1) of the CC, should be assessed objectively or subjective. The Justices were unanimous in their agreement that it should be assessed objectively, but differed as to why they had reached that decision.

The majority (six justices), headed by Justice Sopinka, were of this opinion: the nature of driving offences suggests that a modified objective test is appropriate. They listed the following reasons:

1. The licensing requirement – each driver demonstrates that they are mentally and physically capable of driving before they are licensed. Moreover, it serves to confirm that those who drive are familiar with the standards of care required by all drivers. Additionally, drivers choose to engage in the activity of driving, and thus, place themselves in a position of responsibility. As a result, a consideration of the personal factors, so essential in determining the subjective intent, is not necessary in light of the fixed standards that must be met by licensed drivers.
2. Automatic and reflexive nature of driving – the nature of driving itself is often so routine and automatic that it is almost impossible to determine a particular state of mind of a driver at any given moment. It would, thus, be a denial of common sense for a driver, whose conduct was objectively dangerous, to be acquitted on the ground that he was not thinking of his manner of driving at the time of the accident
3. Statistics – the statistics which demonstrate that all too many tragic deaths and disabling injuries flow from the operation of motor vehicles indicate the need to control the conduct of drivers. There is, therefore, a compelling need for effective legislation which strives to regulate the manner of driving, and the objective test is essential for that.

To mitigate the harshness of the objective test, the justices suggested its institution through, what they termed, the modified objective test – which Justice William McIntyre had suggested in R v Tutton. The test must not be applied in a vacuum, but rather, in the context of the events surrounding the incident. This enables the court to take into account the sudden and unexpected onset of disease and similar human frailties as well as the objective demonstration of dangerous driving. Thus, the trier of fact may convict if satisfied that, viewed objectively, the accused was, in the words of the section, driving in a manner that was “dangerous to the public..." In making the assessment, the trier of fact should be satisfied that the conduct amounted to a marked departure from the standard of care that a reasonable person would observe in the accused's situation. If an explanation is offered by the accused, such as a sudden and unexpected onset of illness, then in order to convict, the trier of fact must be satisfied that a reasonable person in similar circumstances ought to have been aware of the risk and of the danger involved in the conduct manifested by the accused.

Justice McLachlin (Lamer concurring) agrees with the above justice's approach to a modified objective test but differs as to the process. She agrees that all relevant circumstances, including those personal to the accused should be considered, such as any unexpected heart attacks or epileptic seizures. However, she believes that the better analysis of someone who is unable to control their motor vehicle because of the onset of some disease (or something beyond their control) should be that the actus reus element is not established. She argues that the onset of the disease and the subsequent erratic driving amounts to an involuntary act. The actus reus of the offence cannot be established unless the act is voluntary. Thus we need not reach the question of what a reasonable person would have been thinking or adverting to as the car goes off the road, much less what the accused was in fact thinking or not thinking.

== See also ==
- R v DeSousa
- R v Tutton
