= R v DeSousa =

- Supreme Court of Canada

Hearing: December 13, 1991 Judgment: September 24, 1992
- Full case name: Joao (John) DeSousa v. Her Majesty The Queen
- Citations: [1992] 2 S.C.R. 944, 9 O.R. (3d) 544, 95 D.L.R. (4th) 595, 76 C.C.C. (3d) 124, 11 C.R.R. (2d) 193, 15 C.R. (4th) 66, 56 O.A.C. 109
- Docket No.: 22231

Court membership
- Chief Justice: Antonio Lamer; Puisne Justices: Gérard La Forest, Claire L'Heureux-Dubé, John Sopinka, Charles Gonthier, Peter Cory, Beverley McLachlin, William Stevenson, Frank Iacobucci

Reasons given
- Unanimous reasons by: Sopinka J.

R v DeSousa [1992] 2 S.C.R. 944, is the Supreme Court of Canada case where the Court determined the Constitutionally required level for mens rea for the charge of "unlawfully causing bodily harm". The case is one of a series of cases including R. v. Hundal and R. v. Creighton where the Court reduced the requirement for culpability for a number of crimes.

== Background ==
Shortly before midnight, during a New Year party in Toronto on December 31, 1987, a fight broke out. Several people started throwing bottles including Joao DeSousa who threw a bottle that ricocheted off the wall and hit Teresa Santos in the forearm causing serious harm.

DeSousa was charged with unlawfully causing bodily harm contrary to s.269 of the Criminal Code.

The issue before the Court was whether s.269 of the Criminal Code violated the s.7 of the Charter as it potentially allowed for prison sentences for "Absolute Liability" offences (which was deemed unconstitutional in Re B.C. Motor Vehicle Act).

== Ruling ==
Justice Sopinka, writing for the Court, held that s.269 did not violate s.7.

The charge itself is broken down into two separate requirements. First, there must be an underlying offence (the "unlawful act") with a valid mens rea requirement. This includes provincial and federal offences, criminal or otherwise, but precludes any absolute liability offences. Secondly, the "unlawful act" must be at least "objectively dangerous" so that a reasonable person would realize that the act created a risk of bodily harm. Due to the lack of stigma or any sort of significant prison sentence attached to the offence it did not warrant a higher "subjective fault" requirement (R. v. Martineau).

The Court dismissed the argument that the offence would punish the morally innocent by not requiring proof of intention to bring about the consequences. Instead the offence aims to prevent objectively dangerous acts (this justification was elaborated on in R. v. Creighton).

== See also ==
- List of Supreme Court of Canada cases
