= R v Nette =

- Supreme Court of Canada

Hearing: January 16, 2001 Judgment: November 15, 2001
- Full case name: Daniel Matthew Nette v Her Majesty The Queen
- Citations: 2001 SCC 78, [2001] 3 SCR 488
- Docket No.: 27669
- Ruling: Nette appeal dismissed.

Court membership
- Chief Justice: Beverley McLachlin; Puisne Justices: Claire L'Heureux-Dubé, Charles Gonthier, Frank Iacobucci, John C. Major, Michel Bastarache, Ian Binnie, Louise Arbour, Louis LeBel

Reasons given
- Majority: Arbour J
- Dissent: L'Heureux-Dubé J

R v Nette [2001] 3 S.C.R. 488, 2001 SCC 78 is a Supreme Court of Canada decision on the standard for causation in criminal offences. The Court upheld the "Smithers test" for causation in a criminal charge for manslaughter or murder, but held the test for causation for second degree murder need not be expressed as "a contributing cause of death, outside the de minimis range". Instead, it would be preferable to use positive terms such as "significant contributing cause". In the case of first degree murder under section 231(5) of the Criminal Code (the offence of domination), a jury must also consider the additional R v Harbottle "a substantial causation" standard, but only after finding the accused guilty of murder.

== Background ==
A 95-year-old widow was robbed and left hog tied in her room. Over a period of 48 hours, she suffocated to death. During an undercover investigation, a suspect, Daniel Nette, had admitted to an undercover officer that he had robbed and killed the widow. Nette was arrested and charged with first-degree murder under section 231(5) of the Criminal Code.

The leading case on causation was Smithers v R, which required proof of "a contributing cause of death, outside the de minimis range".

In his appeal to the Supreme Court, Nette argued the trial judge misdirected the jury on the standard of causation applicable to second degree murder. The issue before the Supreme Court was whether the standard for causation should be the de minimis test from Smithers, or the "substantial and integral contributing cause" test from Harbottle.

== Opinion of the Court ==
Arbour J, for the majority, noted that the Smithers causation test applies to all forms of homicide. However, the current de minimis test, defining the standard as "not a trivial cause" or "not insignificant", is not helpful and instead should be formulated positively such as "significant contributing cause". She went on to say that since causation is largely fact-driven the judge should have the discretion to rephrase the test as the facts warrant giving the example of Harbottle where, given the high degree of blameworthiness and stigma of the charge, the test was formulated as "a substantial cause".

== Concurring opinion ==
L'Heureux-Dubé, in a concurring opinion, disagreed with Arbour's reformulation of the causation test. She argued that there is a distinction between "not trivial or insignificant" and a "significant contributing cause". Phrased positively, the test has a higher standard that requires a stronger causal relationship.

== See also ==
- List of Supreme Court of Canada cases (McLachlin Court)
