= BG Checo International Ltd v British Columbia Hydro and Power Authority =

- Supreme Court of Canada

Hearing: January 28, 1992 Judgment: January 21, 1993
- Citations: [1993] 1 SCR 12
- Docket No.: 21939
- Prior history: Partial judgment in both parties' favour in the British Columbia Court of Appeal.
- Ruling: BC Hydro's appeal dismissed; Checo's cross-appeal allowed in part.

Holding
- Parties whose relationship is governed by a contract are allowed to sue each other in tort, provided there was no express intention by the parties to limit such actions.

Court membership
- Chief Justice: Antonio Lamer; Puisne Justices: Gérard La Forest, Claire L'Heureux-Dubé, John Sopinka, Charles Gonthier, Peter Cory, Beverley McLachlin, William Stevenson, Frank Iacobucci

Reasons given
- Majority: La Forest and McLachlin JJ, joined by L'Heureux‑Dubé and Gonthier JJ
- Concur/dissent: Iacobucci J, joined by Sopinka J
- Lamer CJ, and Cory and Stevenson JJ took no part in the consideration or decision of the case.

BG Checo International Ltd v British Columbia Hydro and Power Authority, [1993] 1 SCR 12 is a leading decision by the Supreme Court of Canada. The Court held that there is a prima facie presumption that a claimant is able to sue concurrently in tort and contract where sufficient grounds exist. Still, liability in tort will still be subject to an exemptions or conditions set out in a contract.

== Background ==
British Columbia Hydro and Power Authority called for tenders to erect power lines. BG Checo International Ltd. was interested in making a tender and so did a survey of the land by helicopter. On viewing the area they noted that the area was in the process of being clear-cut. BG Checo issued a tender and won. The tender was incorporated into the contract and included terms stating that BG Checo would have no part in clearing a right-of-way to the land. Once the agreement was made no further clearing was done which resulted significant difficulties for BG Checo.

BG Checo sued in tort of negligent misrepresentation and in the alternative breach of contract. The key issue is the case was whether the terms of the contract precluded BG Checo from suing in tort.

== Ruling of the Court ==
La Forest and McLachlin wrote for the majority. Citing Central Trust Co v Rafuse, the Court stated that "where a given wrong prima facie supports an action in contract and in tort, the party may sue in either or both, except where the contract indicates that the parties intended to limit or negative the right to sue in tort".

The Court considered three situations where a party can sue in tort and contract.

1. "where the contract stipulates a more stringent obligation than the general law of tort would impose. In that case, the parties are hardly likely to sue in tort, since they could not recover in tort for the higher contractual duty." Though the right to sue in tort still exists, it is generally not practical.
2. "where the contract stipulates a lower duty than that which would be presumed by the law of tort in similar circumstances." This does not necessarily extinguish the right to sue in tort unless it is explicit in the contract.
3. "where the duty in contract and the common law duty in tort are co-extensive." In such cases, "the plaintiff may seek to sue concurrently or alternatively in tort to secure some advantage peculiar to the law of tort, such as a more generous limitation period."

The Court found that the current situation fell into the third category and so BG Checo was able to sue in both tort and contract.

== See also ==
- List of Supreme Court of Canada cases
