= R v Tutton =

- Supreme Court of Canada

Hearing: November 10, 1987 Judgment: June 8, 1989
- Full case name: Her Majesty the Queen v Arthur Thomas Tutton and Carol Anne Tutton
- Citations: [1989] 1 S.C.R. 1392
- Docket No.: 19284
- Prior history: Judgment for Tutton and Tutton (Court of Appeal for Ontario)
- Ruling: Appeal was dismissed and new trial ordered.

Court membership
- Chief Justice: Brian Dickson; Puisne Justices: Jean Beetz, Willard Estey, William McIntyre, Antonio Lamer, Bertha Wilson, Gerald Le Dain, Gérard La Forest, Claire L'Heureux-Dubé

Reasons given
- Majority: Wilson J., joined by Dickson C.J. and La Forest JJ.
- Dissent: McIntyre J., joined by L'Heureux-Dubé J.
- Concurrence: Lamer J.
- Beetz, Estey and Le Dain JJ. took no part in the consideration or decision of the case.

R v Tutton, [1989] 1 S.C.R. 1392 was a decision of the Supreme Court of Canada on the mens rea requirements for criminal offences related to manslaughter. The Court was split three to three over whether two parents, believing that their diabetic child was cured by God, are guilty of manslaughter for intentionally failing to give the child his insulin.

== Background ==
Carol Anne Tutton and Arthur Tutton were the parents of five-year-old Christopher Tutton who died on October 17, 1981. The Tuttons were deeply religious and believed in faith healing. They believed that Divine intervention could miraculously cure illnesses beyond the power of modern medicine. Mrs. Tutton believed that she had a premonition that God had healed her son of diabetes.

In April 1979, the family physician diagnosed Christopher as diabetic. The doctor explicitly informed the couple that their son would never be able to survive without insulin. On October 2, 1980, Mrs. Tutton stopped administering insulin and within 2 days her son became dangerously ill. The physician who attended the child said that on admission to hospital the child was dangerously ill, suffering from diabetic acidosis, a potentially fatal disorder which was due to the absence of insulin. The doctor admonished the parents when he learned that they had consciously withheld the insulin. He told the parents that insulin would be required by their son for life. Nevertheless, shortly after, Mrs. Tutton believed that she had had a vision of God in which she was told that Christopher had been cured and no more insulin was needed. Mrs. Tutton stopped the insulin injections on October 14, 1981. On October 17, 1981 Christopher was taken to the hospital and pronounced dead on arrival due to complications of diabetic hyperglycemia.

== Analysis ==
Mr. and Mrs. Tutton were charged and convicted of criminal act manslaughter by failing their duty to provide the necessaries of life for their child, contrary to the criminal negligence provision s. 219 of the Criminal Code (then s. 202). Based on a belief held by the couple that the child was cured of its diabetes because of a premonition Mrs. Tutton purported to have, they ceased to give their child his daily insulin shots. As a result, the child died shortly thereafter. On appeal by the couple, the Court of Appeal held that, inter alia, the trial judge had erred in that he did not charge the jury that an omission arising under a negligence offence would require the proof of a subjective element of Mens Rea – namely, that the jury was satisfied that the couple knew that there was a risk to the life or safety of their child, and unjustifiably took that risk or closed their minds to any such risk. On appeal to the Supreme Court, the justices took three separate approaches on what the test for criminal negligence should be.

Justice McIntyre and L'Heureux-Dube were of this opinion: the test for negligence is objective. The justices were unable to see any difference in principle between cases arising from an omission to act and those involving acts of commission. In fact, s. 219 states that one is criminally negligent who, in doing anything or omitting to do anything that it is his duty to do, shows wanton or reckless disregard... The objective test focuses on the conduct of the accused, as opposed to his intention or mental state. What is punished, in other words, is not the state of mind, but the consequences of mindless action. The use of the word “reckless” in the context of s. 219 does not employ its meaning of the extended definition of intention or malice, but rather employs the term as part of a definition of conduct which amounts to “negligence” in a criminal context. In other words, the word “reckless” in s. 219 does not call for the use of subjective mens rea when determining negligence. If the distinction is not kept up, the dividing line between traditional mens rea offences and the offence of criminal negligence will become blurred. Having said that, the Justices emphasized that the application of the objective test in s. 219 cannot be made in a vacuum. Events occur within the framework of other events and actions and, when deciding on the nature of the questioned conduct, surrounding circumstances must be considered. The decision must be made on a consideration of the facts existing at the time and in relation to the accused's perception of those facts. Since the test is objective, the accused's perception of the facts is not to be considered for the purpose of assessing malice or intention, but only to form a basis for a conclusion as to whether or not the accused's conduct, in view of his perception of the facts, was reasonable. In other words, it is no defense to say, on the subjective level, “I was being careful” or “I believed I could do what I did without undue risk”. The defense arises only if that belief was reasonably held. This is particularly true where, as here, the accused has raised the defense of mistake of fact. In the case of Pappajohn, it was held that the honest belief of a fact need not be reasonable, because its effect would be to deny the existence of the requisite mens rea. The situation is different, however, where the offence charged rests upon the concept of negligence. In such a case, an unreasonable, though honest, belief on the part of the accused could be negligently held.

Justice Lamer concurred with the above; however, he was of the opinion that when applying the objective norm test of s. 219, there must be made a “generous allowance” for factors which are particular to the accused, such as youth, mental development and education.

Justice Wilson, Dickson and LaForest did not agree that criminal negligence under s. 219 consists only of conduct in breach of an objective standard and does not require the Crown to prove that the accused had any degree of guilty knowledge. They asserted that the institution of an objective standard for criminal negligence, in essence, constitutes an absolute liability offence, where conviction flows from proof of conduct which reveals a marked and substantial departure from the standard expected of a reasonable person. Aside from the consequences inherent in the application of an objective test, they found the relevant section (s. 219) ambiguous in nature, its interpretation shifting depending on the words emphasized by the interpreter. For example, emphasizing the words "shows" and "negligence" could give rise to an objective standard, whereas emphasizing the phrase “wanton or reckless disregard for the lives or safety of other persons” might suggest that Parliament intended some degree of advertence to the risk to the lives or safety of others to be an essential element of the offence. The justices argued that, coupled with the adjective "reckless", the word “wanton” clearly accentuates the meaning of willful blindness. Thus, they argue that the section signifies more than gross negligence in the objective sense, and actually requires some degree of awareness of advertence. They go on to say that conduct which shows a wanton or reckless disregard for the lives and safety of others will by its nature constitute prima facie evidence of the mental element, and in the absence of evidence that casts doubt on the degree of mental awareness, proof of the act and reference to what a reasonable person in the circumstances must have realized will lead to a conclusion that the accused was aware of or willfully blind to the risk. In cases where the risk to the lives and safety of others present themselves in an obvious fashion, the accused's claim that he or she gave no thought to the risk or had simply a negative state of mind would in most cases amount to the culpable positive mental state of willful blindness to the prohibited risk. In the justice's perceived recognition of the harshness of a uniform application of an objective standard of criminal liability, they advocate a subjective dimension into the objective standard in order to relieve the harshness of imposing an objective standard on those who, because of their peculiar characteristics, could not fairly be expected to live up the standard set by the reasonable person. They advocate the use of a two-pronged test. They cite three formulations of the test, written by different authors, which are substantially the same:

1. Determination of the wrongdoing, which proceeds on the basis of a breach of an objective standard;
2. The court must then determine whether it would be fair to hold a particular accused responsible for the act of wrongdoing. This would take mental and physical capacities into consideration.

The justices argue that part two of the test is justified since to require that all misperceptions be reasonable will, in their view, not excuse many of those who through no fault of their own cannot fairly be expected to live up to the standard of the reasonable person.

== See also ==
- R v Creighton
