= Amchem Products Inc v British Columbia (Workers' Compensation Board) =

- Supreme Court of Canada

Hearing: May 25, 1992 Judgment: March 25, 1993
- Full case name: Workers' Compensation Board and others v. Amchem Products Incorporated and others; Workers' Compensation Board and others v. T & N plc; Workers' Compensation Board and others v. The Flintkote Company
- Citations: [1993] 1 S.C.R. 897
- Docket No.: 22256
- Prior history: Judgment against the Workers' Compensation Board by the Court of Appeal for British Columbia
- Ruling: Appeal granted.

Holding
- 1. An injunction to prevent a party from filing a claim in a different court should only be done when a serious injustice will occur if the other court fails to decline jurisdiction, and should not be done if there is pending proceeding in another court.; 2. The test for declining jurisdiction is whether there is another forum more convenient and appropriate for pursuit of the action and securing the ends of justice.

Court membership
- Chief Justice: Antonio Lamer; Puisne Justices: Gérard La Forest, Claire L'Heureux-Dubé, John Sopinka, Charles Gonthier, Peter Cory, Beverley McLachlin, William Stevenson, Frank Iacobucci

Reasons given
- Unanimous reasons by: Sopinka J.
- Lamer C.J. and L'Heureux-Dubé, Stevenson, and Iacobucci JJ. took no part in the consideration or decision of the case.

Amchem Products Inc v British Columbia (Workers' Compensation Board), [1993] 1 S.C.R. 897 is a leading decision on forum non conveniens by the Supreme Court of Canada. The Court overturned an anti-suit injunction issued by the British Columbia Supreme Court against the courts in Texas on the basis that the British Columbia (BC) court was not necessarily the better forum for the case.

== Background ==
A number of BC residents began an action against several US manufacturers of asbestos in Texas. The Texas court accepted jurisdiction over the matter and heard the case. The manufacturers applied to the BC Supreme Court to issue an anti-suit injunction, arguing that the proper forum for the plaintiffs would be in BC and not Texas.

The BC Supreme Court issued the injunction. In response, Texas issued an "anti-anti-suit injunction". The BC Supreme Court judgment was upheld on appeal to the BC Court of Appeal.

== Ruling of the Court ==
The Supreme Court of Canada overturned the judgment and found that there was insufficient grounds to deny Texas jurisdiction.

The Court adopts the test for forum non conveniens from Spiliada Maritime Corp. v. Cansulex Ltd., [1987] A.C. 460

== See also ==
- List of Supreme Court of Canada cases
- Morguard Investments Ltd. v. De Savoye, (1990)
