= R v Marquard =

- Supreme Court of Canada

Hearing: April 29, 1993 Judgment: October 21, 1993
- Full case name: Debra Marquard v Her Majesty The Queen
- Citations: [1993] 4 S.C.R. 223

Court membership
- Chief Justice: Antonio Lamer; Puisne Justices: Gérard La Forest, Claire L'Heureux-Dubé, John Sopinka, Charles Gonthier, Peter Cory, Beverley McLachlin, Frank Iacobucci, John C. Major

Reasons given
- Majority: McLachlin J., joined by Lamer C.J. and Sopinka, Cory, Iacobucci and Major JJ.:
- Concur/dissent: Gonthier J., joined by La Forest J.
- Dissent: L'Heureux‑Dubé J.

R v Marquard, [1993] 4 S.C.R. 223, is a leading case of the Supreme Court of Canada on the admissibility of expert testimony.

== Background ==
Debra Marquard was charged with aggravated assault for allegedly placing her 3-year-old granddaughter face on hot stove as punishment. At trial Marquard had claimed that the girl was burnt while playing with a butane lighter.

During the trial the court heard testimony from Dr. Mian, an expert on child abuse, regarding the burns to the child despite having no medical expertise on burns.

At issue on appeal was the trial judge's warning of the frailty of the child's testimony and the ability of an expert to give opinion evidence on matters outside their area of expertise.

== Opinion of the Court ==
McLachlin observed that where a witness has "not shown to have possessed expertise to testify in the area, his or her evidence must be disregarded and the jury so instructed." An expert going beyond their ability should not be given any value. The Court must be satisfied that the expert is qualified in all matters to which he or she will answer questions.

Despite the opinions given on the child's burns being outside of the doctors' expertise, it was admitted as they had at least some degree of knowledge. McLachlin stated:

The only requirement for the admission of expert opinion is that the "expert witness possesses special knowledge and experience going beyond that of the trier of fact": R. v. Béland, [1987] 2 S.C.R. 398, at p. 415. Deficiencies in the expertise go to weight, not admissibility.

The opposing counsel will always have the ability to object to any opinions given that go beyond expertise.

== Dissent ==
In dissent, Justice L'Heureux-Dubé argued that the intention of parliament through the amending of section 16 of the Evidence Act was to make the test for admitting child testimony easier to meet. She held that McLachlin's test was too stringent and went against the purpose of the section.

== See also ==
- List of Supreme Court of Canada cases
