= R v Creighton =

- Supreme Court of Canada

Hearing: February 3, 1993 Judgment: September 9, 1993
- Full case name: Her Majesty the Queen v. Marc Creighton
- Citations: [1993] 3 S.C.R. 3
- Docket No.: 22593
- Prior history: judgment for crown (Court of Appeal for Ontario)
- Ruling: Appeal was dismissed.

Holding
- The mens rea for unlawful act manslaughter requires "objective foreseeability of the risk of bodily harm"

Court membership
- Chief Justice: Antonio Lamer; Puisne Justices: Gérard La Forest, Claire L'Heureux-Dubé, John Sopinka, Charles Gonthier, Peter Cory, Beverley McLachlin, Frank Iacobucci, John C. Major

Reasons given
- Majority: McLachlin J., joined by La Forest, L'Heureux-Dubé, Gonthier, and Cory JJ.
- Dissent: Lamer CJ., joined by Sopinka, Iacobucci, and Major JJ.

Laws applied
- R. v. DeSousa, [1992] 2 S.C.R. 944

R v Creighton, [1993] 3 S.C.R. 3 is a case from the Supreme Court of Canada where the Court found that the standard for criminal liability for some offences can be lowered and not offend the Charter. This case marked the last in a series of cases, beginning with R. v. Tutton, discussing the use of an objective standard for determining mens rea in criminal offences.

== Background ==
On the afternoon of October 27, 1989, Marc Creighton, Frank Caddedu, and Ms. Martin consumed large amounts of cocaine and alcohol. Creighton injected himself and his two consenting companions with cocaine. Martin immediately began to convulse and stopped breathing. They were unsuccessful in resuscitating her. Caddedu tried to call 911 but Creighton's threats prevented him from doing so. They cleaned any signs of fingerprints from around the house and then left. Caddedu came back several hours later and called the police.

Creighton was charged under s. 222(5)(a) and (b) of the Criminal Code for manslaughter.

The issue before the Court was whether the common law use of manslaughter (s.222) violated section 7 of the Charter.

== Reasons of the court ==
The majority was written by McLachlin J. (as she was then known) with L'Heureux-Dube, LaForest, Gonthier, and Cory JJ. concurring.

The Court found the common law requirement for mens rea of manslaughter of "objective foreseeability of the risk of bodily harm which is neither trivial nor transitory, in the context of a dangerous act" to be constitutional. The unlawful act must be objectively dangerous and the unreasonableness must be a marked departure from the standard of care of a reasonable person.

The majority dismissed Lamer's focus on "stigma" as indicator for the requirement of mens rea. The very fact that manslaughter is named differently from murder indicates that it is to be treated as less blameworthy. The punishment reflects this in that it has no minimum sentence. As well, this is in line with the principle that intentional crimes are to be punished more severely than unintentional crimes.

The majority further dismissed the proposition that there must be symmetry between all the external elements of the offence and the fault elements. Symmetry would require that there be a fault element for the consequences of the act, namely, that the accused could foresee death. This would require the courts to abandon the thin skull rule which has already been affirmed in cases of homicide (R. v. Smithers), thus it would not be reasonable to require symmetry in all cases. Rather symmetry remains a rule with clear exceptions and cannot be a principle of fundamental justice.

Several policy considerations were discussed which supported the majority's conclusion. First, a broader standard is required for deterrence. It tells people that if they act in a dangerous manner even where death is not foreseeable, they may be held liable for any deaths that are caused. Second, the broader standard accords with the sense of justice. An aggressor must take their victims as they find them. Criminal law must reflect the concerns of the victim and society when a victim is killed. Third, the broader standard removes the hassle of making distinctions between foreseeability of harm or death which could potentially cause problems in the future.

The majority made a point of criticizing the test proposed by Lamer. Lamer's test personalizes the objective test to a point where it resembles a subjective test. The reasonable person should not be vested with the "frailties" and characteristics of the accused. Policy and principle demands a single, uniform legal standard for such offences. There is no support in criminal law theory that suggests that the morally innocent are protected through examination of individual circumstances. It is only in cases of incapacity that characteristics should be considered.

The standard remains as to what a reasonably prudent person would have done in all the circumstances. Consequently, activities that pose a greater threat or require greater expertise will require a greater standard of care. A person may fail that standard by undertaking an act they are not qualified in resulting in culpable negligence, or a person who is qualified may negligently fail to exercise the special care required by the activity.

The majority suggests a three-step test for unlawful act manslaughter.

1. Establish the actus reus. The activity must constitute a marked departure from the standard of care of a reasonable person in all circumstances of the case. This includes carrying out an act in a dangerous manner or carrying out an inherently dangerous act.
2. Establish the mens rea. The activity must have been done while there was objective foresight of harm that can be inferred from the facts. The standard is that of the reasonable person in the circumstances of the accused.
3. Establish capacity. Given the personal characteristics of the accused, were they capable of appreciating the risk flowing from their conduct?

== Dissent ==
Lamer C.J. (Sopinka, Iacobucci, and Major JJ. concurring) agreed with the majority's result, but differed in their reasons.

The dissent was of the opinion that the standard for manslaughter should be "objective foreseeability of the risk of death", and that the objective standard should take into account the experiences of the accused and their particular "human frailties".

Lamer applied his "stigma" doctrine that he developed in R. v. Vaillancourt. The stigma of manslaughter is less than murder but is nevertheless serious enough to require at least objective foreseeability of the risk of death.

Crimes involving an underlying unlawful act generally require symmetry. There are no extenuating circumstances that suggest an exception should be made. Thus, a broader standard of foresight of bodily harm cannot be used as it is asymmetric to the consequences.

Lamer suggests a three-part test to approach unlawful act manslaughter.

1. Establish unlawful act. The crown must show that the accused performed an unlawful act that was objectively dangerous. That is, a reasonable person would foresee the risk of harm. (R. v. DeSousa)
2. Establish mens rea of predicate offence.
3. Establish foresight of risk of death. Must show that a reasonable person in the circumstances and possessing the characteristics of the accused would foresee the act creating a risk of death.

Lamer went into great detail on this last step. It must be asked whether the accused had any special knowledge related to their conduct that would enhance their foresight. Alternatively, was the accused unaware because they did not turn their mind to the consequences or because they lacked capacity to do so due to their "human frailties"? If so, it must be asked whether, in the context of the accused, would a reasonable person have made themselves aware of the consequences of the unlawful act.

The key to this analysis rests on whether the accused had any control over their "frailty" which rendered them unable to foresee the risk. It is the control that produces the moral culpability.

if one is able to act prudently and not endanger the life of others, one will be held liable for failing to do so. One must be morally -- and criminally -- responsible to act according to his or her capacities not to inflict harm, even unintentional harm. By contrast, the inability to control a particular frailty which resulted in the creation of the risk may offer a moral excuse for having brought about that risk.

== Principles of Fundamental Justice ==
McLachlin J outlined the constitutional element of Mens Rea: 1. the stigma attached to the offence, and the available penalties requiring a mens rea reflecting the particular nature of the crime; 2. whether the punishment is proportionate to the moral blameworthiness of the offender; and 3. the idea that those causing harm intentionally must be punished more severely than those causing harm unintentionally.

== See also ==
- Eggshell skull rule aka the "Thin Skull Doctrine"
- List of Supreme Court of Canada cases
