= Canada (AG) v Ward =

- Supreme Court of Canada

Hearing: March 25, 1992 Judgment: June 30, 1993
- Full case name: Patrick Francis Ward v. The Attorney General of Canada
- Citations: [1993] 2 S.C.R. 689
- Docket No.: 21937
- Prior history: Judgment for the Attorney General of Canada in the Federal Court of Appeal.
- Ruling: Appeal allowed.

Holding
- Women, children, and sexual minorities are protected under refugee law. Refugee claimants must show that the state is unable to act, but do not need to establish state complicity.

Court membership
- Chief Justice: Antonio Lamer; Puisne Justices: Gérard La Forest, Claire L'Heureux-Dubé, John Sopinka, Charles Gonthier, Peter Cory, Beverley McLachlin, William Stevenson, Frank Iacobucci

Reasons given
- Unanimous reasons by: La Forest J.
- Lamer C.J. and Sopinka, McLachlin, and Stevenson JJ. took no part in the consideration or decision of the case.

Canada (AG) v Ward, [1993] 2 S.C.R. 689 is a refugee law case decided by the Supreme Court of Canada. It was significant for clarifying what constitutes a "well-founded fear of persecution" when making a claim for Convention refugee status.

== Background ==
In 1983, Patrick Ward joined the Irish National Liberation Army (INLA), hoping to “take a stand” and “protect himself and his family... from the IRA.” Soon after joining, he was ordered to guard a group of hostages, but after learning that they were to be executed, he allowed them to escape, citing his “conscience.” When the INLA discovered what Ward had done, they captured him, tortured him, and sentenced him to death. He was able to escape with the help of the police but was charged for his role in the original crime, spending three years in prison. After being released, he flew to Canada with the assistance of a prison chaplain and claimed refugee status. The Immigration and Refugee Board accepted his claim but the Federal Court of Appeal subsequently rejected it, causing Ward to appeal to the Supreme Court of Canada, which heard the case in 1992.

== Decision of the Court ==
Canadian law, borrowing from the 1951 Refugee Convention, says that a "Convention refugee" must have a "well-founded fear of persecution for reasons of race, religion, nationality, membership in a particular social group or political opinion" and that they must be "unable or, by reason of that fear... unwilling to avail [themself] of the protection of [their] country." The judgment of the court, rendered by Gérard La Forest, held that Ward was not persecuted as a member of a "particular social group," but that he may have been persecuted because of his "political opinions."

Because Ward held dual British-Irish citizenship, the claim that he could not "avail himself of the protection of" his country was also contentious. Even if he could not avail himself of Irish protection, it was possible that he could avail himself of British protection. La Forest ruled that while Britain could be assumed capable of protecting its own citizens, it might reject Ward's right of entry because of his ties to the INLA.

Ultimately, La Forest permitted the appeal and returned the case to the Immigration and Refugee Board. However, in the end, Ward's refugee status was denied and he was deported in 1997.

== Significance ==
The decision in Canada (AG) v Ward explicitly named women, children, and sexual minorities as groups protected under the “particular social group” clause of the 1951 Refugee Convention. The rationale for naming these particular groups was that gender, age, and sexual orientation are “immutable characteristics.” Some praised the court’s decision as a “step forward in human rights” while others criticized it for its focus on the “innateness” of protected characteristics rather than their marginalized status within society.

The decision also recognized the responsibility of states to protect their people and to prevent them from being threatened or abused. La Forest’s ruling asserts that if a state is unable or unwilling to protect someone, that is grounds for that person to claim persecution, even in the absence of direct “state complicity.”

== See also ==
- List of Supreme Court of Canada cases
