= R v Evans and McDonald =

2012 Welsh rape trial

- Court: Crown Court
- Full case name: Regina v Chedwyn Michael Evans and Clayton Rodney McDonald [2012] EWCA Crim 2559
- Decided: 20 April 2012; appeal: 21 April 2016
- Citation: [2016] EWCA Crim 452; [2016] 4 WLR 169; [2017] 1 Cr App R 13 (appeal only reaching precedent focussed Law Reports)

Case history
- Subsequent actions: Chedwyn Evans v R [2016] (appeal); R v Chedwyn Evans [2016] (retrial with adduction and admittance of fresh evidence)

Court membership
- Judge sitting: HHJ Merfyn Hughes QC

Keywords
- alcohol and drugs; allegation of rape; allegation of incapacity to consent to sex; character evidence of complainant's unusually similar sexual history

R v Evans and McDonald was the prosecution of two footballers, Ched Evans and Clayton McDonald, who were accused of the rape of a woman. On 20 April 2012, Evans was convicted and sentenced to five years imprisonment. McDonald was acquitted. Several people were later fined after naming the woman on Twitter and other social media websites.

Evans served 2 1/2 years in prison, being paroled on the Early Release Scheme. After this, his conviction was overturned on appeal in favour of a retrial. The appeal became a reported case by at least three sets of Law Reports as it confirmed only similar non-hearsay testimony of historic sexual encounters by a third party with a complainant, which is so similar that similarity cannot be reasonably explained by coincidence, can be admitted by the presiding judge, heard or written (adduced) in evidence and then considered by a jury. Such witnesses came forward who testified, with supporting evidence, to that effect. At retrial the jury found Evans not guilty, as McDonald had been found at the original trial.

== Background ==
On 30 May 2011, Wales international and Sheffield United player Ched Evans and McDonald were arrested on suspicion of the sexual assault of a woman in Rhyl, Denbighshire, in connection with what was later proven and admitted to have been sexual intercourse at a Premier Inn in Rhuddlan on the same day. On 26 July, the two were charged with rape, which they both denied.

== Criminal proceedings ==
=== Preliminary hearings ===
On 8 August 2011, McDonald and Evans appeared before Prestatyn Magistrates' Court charged with rape. The defendants were released on bail and did not comment on the matter, but McDonald told his team, Port Vale F.C.'s website that he "strongly refute[d]" the allegation. Evans also issued a statement on Sheffield United's website stating that he "strenuously denie[d] the charge". McDonald and Evans entered pleas of not guilty at the Crown Court at Caernarfon on 14 October, and were remanded on bail.

=== Trial ===
The trial took place at that court in April 2012. The woman, a 19-year-old waitress, said she had drunk two glasses of wine, four double vodkas with lemonade, and a shot of sambuca. As a result, she told police she "felt tipsy but not out of control". However, she woke up naked and confused in a hotel bed with no memory of anything since leaving a dancing session with friends the previous night. She suspected that her memory loss was due to a spiked drink. Samples taken the next day showed no alcohol, although the prosecution argued this was due to normal elimination over time. The samples did show traces of cocaine and cannabis, which she denied taking on the night of the incident. The prosecution argument was that the woman was too intoxicated to have consented.

The defence agreed that McDonald met the woman on the street and took her back to the hotel, where they were later joined by Evans. However, they claimed that both men had sex with the woman separately and with her consent. They argued she was not too drunk to consent, and suggested that her claim of memory loss may be a lie.

On 20 April 2012, the jury returned its verdicts. McDonald was acquitted. Evans was convicted of rape and sentenced to five years imprisonment. Judge Merfyn Hughes QC stated in his sentencing remarks that: "The complainant was 19 years of age and was extremely intoxicated. CCTV footage shows, in my view, the extent of her intoxication when she stumbled into your friend. As the jury have found, she was in no condition to have sexual intercourse. When you arrived at the hotel, you must have realised that."

=== Appeals ===
On 24 April 2012, it was announced that Evans was seeking the leave of the Court of Appeal to appeal against his conviction. On 20 August 2012, leave to appeal was refused by a single judge of the Court of Appeal, and on 6 November 2012, a three-judge panel agreed with the refusal.

By November 2013, Evans had recruited a new legal team headed by an ex-senior detective, Russ Whitfield, and higher courts specialist Criminal lawyer David Emanuel. In July 2014, he launched another appeal attempt via the Criminal Cases Review Commission.

Evans was released from prison, reaching the date for release on the early release scheme, without misbehaviour nor an adverse Probation Service report, on 17 October 2014.

Shortly afterwards, the Criminal Cases Review Commission announced that they were prioritising their review of his conviction. In October 2015, the CCRC, based on new material which was not considered by the jury at trial, decided to refer the case to the Court of Appeal. This obliged the court to reconsider the trial process and evidence admitted and excluded leading to the conviction.

The appeal evidence was heard by Lady Justice Hallett, Mr Justice Flaux, and Sir David Maddison on 22 and 23 March 2016, and the decision pronounced on 21 April. Evans's conviction was quashed, and the court ordered a retrial. To avoid prejudicing the retrial, it prohibited the publication of details of the appeal until the retrial was complete.

The Court of Criminal Appeal judgement stated:

71. When the appellant [Ched Evans] was first asked what happened in room 14, he described in graphic detail the sexual behaviour of a woman who, on the prosecution case, would have been incapable of behaving in that way. If the jury rejected his account of her sexual behaviour, he had no defence. Two other men have described specific instances of her behaving in a very similar fashion with them, in the days before the alleged rape and in the days that followed. On each occasion she had been drinking, she is said to have instigated certain sexual activity, directed her sexual partner into certain positions, and used specific words of encouragement."

According to The Guardian,

During the appeal case that led to the retrial, lawyers for the crown suggested that the two new witnesses may have been “fed” information by those close to Evans. This claim was rejected by Evans’s side and by the appeal court. The appeal court judges expressed “a considerable degree of hesitation” before allowing the new evidence of the former partners because it would result in the complainant’s sexual behaviour being subject to forensic scrutiny. Evans’s girlfriend, Natasha Massey, was accused in legal argument during the second trial of offering an “inducement” to a key witness. The prosecution said this had “the flavour of a bribe”. The trial judge disagreed.

In court, Evans admitted that he lied to get the key for the hotel room and did not speak to the woman before, during or after sex. He left via a fire exit. It also emerged that Evans’s younger brother and another man were trying to film what was happening from outside the room.

=== Retrial ===
Evans' retrial began on 4 October 2016 at Cardiff Crown Court. The main new evidence included was from other men who had had consensual sex with the woman, who testified that her sexual behaviour was similar to that which Evans described. Details of a complainant's sexual history are not usually admissible, but there is an exception, reiterated (upheld) on appeal in the Law Reports, for evidence which is "so similar [to the defence's account] that the similarity cannot reasonably be explained as a coincidence". The prosecution's allegations of the witnesses of perhaps receiving this account from Evans' defence campaign, and being motivated by the £50,000 reward offered for information were rejected by the jury.

On 14 October, following two hours of deliberation, the jury of seven women and five men returned a verdict of not guilty.

== Naming of complainant on the internet ==
North Wales Police investigated claims that the woman had been named and subjected to abuse on Twitter after the trial. Former Lord Chancellor, Lord Falconer of Thoroton, Holly Dustin, the director of End Violence Against Women, and Secretary of State for the Home Department Theresa May warned of the risks posed by discussing court cases on social media websites, and reiterated the need to protect the anonymity of complainants in cases concerning sexual offences. As of 6 October 2012, North Wales Police had arrested 23 people on suspicion of offences relating to the naming of the complainant. Police also investigated a mistake by Sky News which showed the name of the complainant on television.

Sheffield United academy and reserve team player Connor Brown was suspended by his club after allegedly making offensive comments about the woman on Twitter, although he did not give her name.

On 5 November 2012, nine people who had named the complainant on Twitter and Facebook, including a cousin of Evans, were each told to pay her £624 after admitting the offence at Prestatyn magistrates' court. A tenth person pleaded not guilty, but later changed her plea to guilty on 21 January 2013.

The complainant changed her identity as a result of having been named on social media; in October 2014, after Evans' release from prison, it was reported that her new identity had been illegally revealed on Twitter and blogs.

The complainant continued to be identified online during Evans' retrial in 2016.
