= Ramsden v Peterborough (City of) =

Ramsden v. Peterborough (City of)
- Supreme Court of Canada

Hearing: 1 June 1993 Judgment: 2 September 1993
- Full case name: The Corporation of the City of Peterborough v Kenneth Ramsden
- Citations: [1993] 2 SCR 1084
- Docket No.: 22787
- Prior history: APPEAL from Ramsden v. Peterborough (City of), 1991 CanLII 7193 (22 October 1991)
- Ruling: Appeal dismissed

Court membership
- Chief Justice: Antonio Lamer; Puisne Justices: Gérard La Forest, Claire L'Heureux-Dubé, John Sopinka, Charles Gonthier, Peter Cory, Beverley McLachlin, Frank Iacobucci, John C. Major

Reasons given
- Unanimous reasons by: Iacobucci J

Ramsden v Peterborough (City of), [1993] 2 SCR 1084 is a leading Supreme Court of Canada decision where the Court struck down a bylaw prohibiting all postering on public property on the grounds that it violated freedom of expression under section 2(b) of the Canadian Charter of Rights and Freedoms.

== Background ==
Kenneth Ramsden was charged on two separate occasions placing posters on hydro poles advertising his band. He claimed that the bylaw was unconstitutional. A justice of the peace found that the bylaw was constitutional and he was fined. The decision was upheld on appeal to the Provincial Court. However, on appeal to the Court of Appeal for Ontario the decision was overturned and it was held that the bylaw was in violation of the right to freedom of expression and could not be saved under section 1 of the Charter.

== Opinion of the Court ==
Justice Iacobucci, writing for a unanimous Court, upheld the decision of the Ontario Court of Appeal.

Iacobucci examined the test for freedom of expression. He stated that section 2(b) is violated where a law, in either purpose or effect, limits expression. He found that the purpose of the bylaw was to do just that. Postering was a form of expression as it conveyed some meaning.

Iacobucci found that even though the purpose of the bylaw was meritious, the absolute ban was not justifiable.
