= Central Trust Co v Rafuse =

- Supreme Court of Canada

Hearing: December 6, 1984 Judgment: October 9, 1986
- Full case name: Central Trust Company v Jack P Rafuse and Franklyn W Cordon
- Citations: [1986] 2 SCR 147
- Docket No.: 17753
- Ruling: Central Trust appeal dismissed.

Court membership
- Chief Justice: Brian Dickson; Puisne Justices: Roland Ritchie, Jean Beetz, Willard Estey, William McIntyre, Julien Chouinard, Antonio Lamer, Bertha Wilson, Gerald Le Dain

Reasons given
- Unanimous reasons by: Le Dain J

Central Trust Co v Rafuse, [1986] 2 SCR 147 is a leading decision of the Supreme Court of Canada on liability of solicitors in negligence and breach of contract as well as the doctrine of discoverability under the statute of limitations.

== Background ==
Jack Rafuse and Franklyn Cordon were solicitors who had been hired by a company, which had purchased the shares of Stonehouse Motel and Restaurant Ltd. The agreement of sale required the purchasers to take out a mortgage on the property and to use the assets used as part of the purchase price of the shares. The solicitors had been retained to complete the mortgage transaction.

Eight years later, the creditor for the mortgage, Central Trust Co., initiated a foreclosure of the mortgage. The creditor, Irving Oil Ltd., tried to prevent the foreclosure by claiming that the mortgage was invalid. The case went to the Supreme Court of Canada. In its decision Central and Eastern Trust Co v Irving Oil Ltd, the mortgage was invalidated. Having lost the case, Central Trust brought an action against the lawyers for negligence and breach of contract.

In their defence, Rafuse and Cordon claimed:

- Their liability, if any, was in contract only and not in tort.
- They had not been negligent, particularly in view of the conflicting judicial opinion on the question of the validity of the mortgage.
- There was contributory negligence on the part of the Nova Scotia Trust Company or those for whom it was responsible because of the approval of the mortgage loan and the instructions to the respondents by persons of legal training.
- The contract between the Nova Scotia Trust Company and the respondents, having as its object an illegal transaction, was itself illegal and could not therefore be the basis of an action in damages.
- The appellant's action was barred by the statute of limitations.

These issues before the Court:

1. Can a solicitor be liable to a client in tort and in contract for negligence in the performance of the professional services for which the solicitor has been retained?
2. Were the respondent solicitors negligent in carrying out the mortgage transaction for the Nova Scotia Trust Company?
3. Was there contributory negligence on the part of the Nova Scotia Trust Company or those for whom it was responsible?
4. Is the appellant prevented from bringing its action because of the illegality of the mortgage?
5. Is the appellant's action barred by the statute of limitations?

== Reasons of the court ==
LeDain J wrote the reasons for the majority.

On the first issue, he held that the duty in tort and in contract are two entirely-separate duties and can be held concurrently by a defendant.

On the statute of limitations, it was held that the plaintiffs were not statute-barred from commencing an action. The commencement of the limitation period was postponed by the common law "discoverability principle:" "A cause of action arises for purposes of a limitation period when the material facts on which it is based have been discovered or ought to have been discovered by the plaintiff by the exercise of reasonable diligence."
