= R v Harbottle =

- Supreme Court of Canada

Hearing: May 25, 1993 Judgment: September 30, 1993
- Full case name: James Harbottle v Her Majesty The Queen
- Citations: [1993] 3 SCR 306
- Docket No.: 23037
- Ruling: Harbottle appeal dismissed

Court membership
- Chief Justice: Antonio Lamer; Puisne Justices: Gérard La Forest, Claire L'Heureux-Dubé, John Sopinka, Charles Gonthier, Peter Cory, Beverley McLachlin, Frank Iacobucci, John C. Major

Reasons given
- Unanimous reasons by: Cory J

R v Harbottle, [1993] 3 SCR 306 is a Canadian criminal law case decided by the Supreme Court of Canada on the standard of causation required in order for an accused to be convicted of first degree murder under section 231(5) (where the murder is subsequent to a predicate offence) of the Criminal Code. The Court held that the standard for this provision must be strict requiring a "substantial and integral cause". On the facts, the Court found that Harbottle's conduct in holding the victim's legs while she was strangled to death was sufficient to be a substantial and integral cause. This standard does not apply to all first degree murder, where the standard articulated in R v Nette applies.

== See also ==
- List of Supreme Court of Canada cases
