= 2004 reasons of the Supreme Court of Canada =

The table below lists the reasons delivered from the bench by the Supreme Court of Canada during 2004. The table illustrates what reasons were filed by each justice in each case, and which justices joined each reason. This list, however, does not include decisions on motions.

Of the 80 reasons released in 2004, 8 were oral reasons, 55 were unanimous, and 2 motions.

== Reasons ==
Case name	Argued	Decided	McLachlin	Gothier	Iacobucci	Major	Bastarache	Binnie	Arbour	LeBel	Deschamps	Fish	Abella	Charron
Giguère v Chambre des notaires du Québec, [2004] 1 S.C.R. 3; 2004 SCC 1	June 5, 2003	January 29, 2004												
International Alliance of Theatrical Stage Employees, Stage Local 56 v Société de la Place des Arts de Montréal, [2004] 1 S.C.R. 43; 2004 SCC 2	June 12, 2003	January 29, 2004												
Crystalline Investments Ltd v Domgroup Ltd, [2004] 1 S.C.R. 60; 2004 SCC 3	November 7, 2003	January 29, 2004												
Canadian Foundation for Children, Youth and the Law v Canada (AG), [2004] 1 S.C.R. 76; 2004 SCC 4	June 6, 2003	January 30, 2004							1		2			
R v Lyttle, [2004] 1 S.C.R. 193; 2004 SCC 5	October 17, 2003	February 12, 2004												
R v Daoust, [2004] 1 S.C.R. 217; 2004 SCC 6	October 8, 2003	February 12, 2004												
Transport North American Express Inc v New Solutions Financial Corp, [2004] 1 S.C.R. 249; 2004 SCC 7	October 16, 2003	February 12, 2004					1				2	2		
9050-3400 Québec Inc v Riverin, Girard & Associés Inc, [2004] 1 S.C.R. 301; 2004 SCC 8	February 17, 2004	February 17, 2004								V				
Hamilton v Open Window Bakery Ltd, [2004] 1 S.C.R. 303; 2004 SCC 9	November 13, 2003	February 19, 2004												
Townsend v Kroppmanns, [2004] 1 S.C.R. 315; 2004 SCC 10	December 2, 2003	February 19, 2004												
Case name	Argued	Decided	McLachlin	Gothier	Iacobucci	Major	Bastarache	Binnie	Arbour	LeBel	Deschamps	Fish	Abella	Charron
R v Kehler, [2004] 1 S.C.R. 328; 2004 SCC 11	February 19, 2004	February 19, 2004												
CU v Alberta (Director of Child Welfare), [2004] 1 S.C.R. 336; 2004 SCC 12	February 19, 2004	February 19, 2004												
CCH Canadian Ltd v Law Society of Upper Canada, [2004] 1 S.C.R. 339; 2004 SCC 13	November 10, 2003	March 4, 2004												
R v Smith, [2004] 1 S.C.R. 385; 2004 SCC 14	October 7, 2003	March 4, 2004												
Gifford v Canada, [2004] 1 S.C.R. 411; 2004 SCC 15	November 14, 2003	March 4, 2004												
R v Cheddesingh, [2004] 1 S.C.R. 433; 2004 SCC 16	March 19, 2004	March 19, 2004	V											
John Doe v Bennett, [2004] 1 S.C.R. 436; 2004 SCC 17	January 14, 2004	March 25, 2004												
Foster Wheeler Power Co v Société intermunicipale de gestion et d'élimination des déchets (SIGED) inc, [2004] 1 S.C.R. 456; 2004 SCC 18	November 12, 2003	March 25, 2004												
United Taxi Drivers' Fellowship of Southern Alberta v Calgary (City of), [2004] 1 S.C.R. 485; 2004 SCC 19	December 8, 2003	March 25, 2004												
Penetanguishene Mental Health Centre v Ontario (AG), [2004] 1 S.C.R. 498; 2004 SCC 20	November 5, 2003	March 26, 2004												
Case name	Argued	Decided	McLachlin	Gothier	Iacobucci	Major	Bastarache	Binnie	Arbour	LeBel	Deschamps	Fish	Abella	Charron
Pinet v St Thomas Psychiatric Hospital, [2004] 1 S.C.R. 528; 2004 SCC 21	November 5, 2003	March 26, 2004												
Hartshorne v Hartshorne, [2004] 1 S.C.R. 550; 2004 SCC 22	November 6, 2003	March 26, 2004												
Voice Construction Ltd v Construction & General Workers' Union, Local 92, [2004] 1 S.C.R. 609; 2004 SCC 23	January 23, 2004	April 8, 2004												
Garland v Consumers' Gas Co, [2004] 1 S.C.R. 629; 2004 SCC 25	October 9, 2003	April 22, 2004												
Cartaway Resources Corp (Re), [2004] 1 S.C.R. 672; 2004 SCC 26	November 7, 2003	April 22, 2004												
R v Fontaine, [2004] 1 S.C.R. 702; 2004 SCC 27	November 6, 2003	April 22, 2004												
Alberta Union of Provincial Employees v Lethbridge Community College, [2004] 1 S.C.R. 727; 2004 SCC 28	November 4, 2003	April 29, 2004												
Bank of Nova Scotia v Thibault, [2004] 1 S.C.R. 758; 2004 SCC 29	November 4, 2003	May 14, 2004												
Quebec (Commission des droits de la personne et des droits de la jeunesse) v Communauté urbaine de Montréal, [2004] 1 S.C.R. 789; 2004 SCC 30	November 9, 2003	May 14, 2004												
Pritchard v Ontario (Human Right Commission), [2004] 1 S.C.R. 809; 2004 SCC 31	March 23, 2004	May 14, 2004												
Case name	Argued	Decided	McLachlin	Gothier	Iacobucci	Major	Bastarache	Binnie	Arbour	LeBel	Deschamps	Fish	Abella	Charron
Nutribec Ltée v Quebec (Commission d'appel en matière de lésions professionnelles), [2004] 1 S.C.R. 824; 2004 SCC 32	May 14, 2004	May 14, 2004	V											
Harper v Canada (AG), [2004] 1 S.C.R. 827; 2004 SCC 33	February 10, 2004	May 18, 2004												
Monsanto Canada Inc v Schmeiser, [2004] 1 S.C.R. 902; 2004 SCC 34	January 20, 2004	May 21, 2004												
Bibaud v Québec (Régie de l'assurance maladie), [2004] 2 S.C.R. 3; 2004 SCC 35	March 17, 2004	June 10, 2004												
Finney v Barreau du Québec, [2004] 2 S.C.R. 17; 2004 SCC 36	February 12, 2004	June 10, 2004												
Banque nationale de Paris (Canada) v 165836 Canada Inc, [2004] 2 S.C.R. 45; 2004 SCC 37	February 11, 2004	June 10, 2004												
British Columbia v Canadian Forest Products Ltd, [2004] 2 S.C.R. 74; 2004 SCC 38	October 16, 2003	June 11, 2004												
Quebec (Commission des droits de la pesonne et des droits de la jeunesse) v Quebec (AG), [2004] 2 S.C.R. 185; 2004 SCC 39	October 14, 2003	June 11, 2004												
Quebec (AG) v Quebec (Human Rights Tribunal), [2004] 2 S.C.R. 223; 2004 SCC 40	October 14, 2003	June 11, 2004												
R v Rémillard, [2004] 2 S.C.R. 246; 2004 SCC 41	June 18, 2004	June 18, 2004	V											
Case name	Argued	Decided	McLachlin	Gothier	Iacobucci	Major	Bastarache	Binnie	Arbour	LeBel	Deschamps	Fish	Abella	Charron
Application under s 83.28 of the Criminal Code (Re), [2004] 2 S.C.R. 248; 2004 SCC 42		June 23, 2004						1		2		2		
Vancouver Sun (Re), [2004] 2 S.C.R. 332; 2004 SCC 43		June 23, 2004												
R v Kerr, [2004] 2 S.C.R. 371; 2004 SCC 44	January 16, 2004	June 23, 2004							1	1	2	2		
Society of Composers, Authors and Music Publishers of Canada v Canadian Assn of Internet Providers, [2004] 2 S.C.R. 427; 2004 SCC 45	December 3, 2003	June 30, 2004												
R v Demers, [2004] 2 S.C.R. 489; 2004 SCC 46	January 21, 2004	June 30, 2004												
Syndicat Northcrest v Amselem, [2004] 2 S.C.R. 551; 2004 SCC 47	January 19, 2004	June 30, 2004					1	2		1	1			
Congrégation des témoins de Jéhovah de St-Jérôme-Lafontaine v Lafontaine (Village of), [2004] 2 S.C.R. 650; 2004 SCC 48	January 19, 2004	June 30, 2004				2	1			1	1			
Anderson v Amoco Canada Oil and Gas, [2004] 3 S.C.R. 3; 2004 SCC 49	April 22, 2004	July 16, 2004												
R v Raponi, [2004] 3 S.C.R. 35; 2004 SCC 50	May 17, 2004	July 16, 2004												
Nova Scotia Power Inc v Canada, [2004] 3 S.C.R. 53; 2004 SCC 51	June 11, 2004	July 16, 2004												
R v Mann, [2004] 3 S.C.R. 59; 2004 SCC 52	March 26, 2004	July 23, 2004												
Case name	Argued	Decided	McLachlin	Gothier	Iacobucci	Major	Bastarache	Binnie	Arbour	LeBel	Deschamps	Fish	Abella	Charron
Gilles E Néron Communication Marketing Inc v Chambre des notaires du Québec, [2004] 3 S.C.R. 95; 2004 SCC 53	February 18, 2004	July 29, 2004												
Monsanto Canada Inc v Ontario (Superintendent of Financial Services), [2004] 3 S.C.R. 152; 2004 SCC 54	February 16, 2004	July 29, 2004												
Cabiakman v Industrial Alliance Life Insurance Co, [2004] 3 S.C.R. 195; 2004 SCC 55	March 19, 2004	July 29, 2004												
R v Perrier, [2004] 3 S.C.R. 228; 2004 SCC 56	May 19, 2004	September 30, 2004												
R v Chan, [2004] 3 S.C.R. 245; 2004 SCC 57	May 19, 2004	September 30, 2004												
Côté v Rancourt, [2004] 3 S.C.R. 248; 2004 SCC 58	June 11, 2004	September 30, 2004												
Épiciers Unis Métro-Richelieu Inc, division "Éconogros" v Collin, [2004] 3 S.C.R. 257; 2004 SCC 59	June 17, 2004	October 1, 2004												
Glykis v Hydro-Québec, [2004] 3 S.C.R. 285; 2004 SCC 60	April 13, 2004	October 1, 2004												
Entreprises Sibeca Inc v Frelighsburg (Municipality of), [2004] 3 S.C.R. 304; 2004 SCC 61	March 23, 2004	October 1, 2004												
Lefebvre (Trustee of); Tremblay (Trustee of), [2004] 3 S.C.R. 326; 2004 SCC 63	April 20, 2004	October 28, 2004												
Case name	Argued	Decided	McLachlin	Gothier	Iacobucci	Major	Bastarache	Binnie	Arbour	LeBel	Deschamps	Fish	Abella	Charron
Ouellet (Trustee of), [2004] 3 S.C.R. 348; 2004 SCC 64	April 20, 2004	October 28, 2004												
Hodge v Canada (Minister of Human Resources Development), [2004] 3 S.C.R. 357; 2004 SCC 65	March 18, 2004	October 28, 2004												
Newfoundland (Treasury Board) v Newfoundland and Labrador Assn of Public and Private Employees, [2004] 3 S.C.R. 381; 2004 SCC 66	May 12, 2004	October 28, 2004												
R v Tessling, [2004] 3 S.C.R. 432; 2004 SCC 67	April 16, 2004	October 29, 2004												
Peoples Department Stores Inc (Trustee of) v Wise, [2004] 3 S.C.R. 461; 2004 SCC 68	May 11, 2004	October 29, 2004												
R v Blake, [2004] 3 S.C.R. 503; 2004 SCC 69	October 15, 2004	October 29, 2004												
R v Saunders, [2004] 3 S.C.R. 505; 2004 SCC 70	November 5, 2004	November 5, 2004	V											
R v Smith, [2004] 3 S.C.R. 507; 2004 SCC 71	November 12, 2004	November 12, 2004	V											
R v Zurowski, [2004] 3 S.C.R. 509; 2004 SCC 72	November 12, 2004	November 12, 2004	V											
Haida Nation v British Columbia (Minister of Forests), [2004] 3 S.C.R. 511; 2004 SCC 73	March 24, 2004	November 18, 2004												
Case name	Argued	Decided	McLachlin	Gothier	Iacobucci	Major	Bastarache	Binnie	Arbour	LeBel	Deschamps	Fish	Abella	Charron
Taku River Tlingit First Nation v British Columbia (Project Assessment Director), [2004] 3 S.C.R. 550; 2004 SCC 74	March 24, 2004	November 18, 2004												
Pacific National Investments Ltd v Victoria (City of), [2004] 3 S.C.R. 575; 2004 SCC 75	June 15, 2004	November 19, 2004												
R v Deschamplain, [2004] 3 S.C.R. 601; 2004 SCC 76	June 16, 2004	November 19, 2004						1		2		3		
R v Sazant, [2004] 3 S.C.R. 635; 2004 SCC 77	June 16, 2004	November 19, 2004												
Auton (Guardian ad litem of) v British Columbia (AG), [2004] 3 S.C.R. 657; 2004 SCC 78	June 9, 2004	November 19, 2004												
Reference Re Same-Sex Marriage, [2004] 3 S.C.R. 698; 2004 SCC 79	October 6, 7, 2004	December 19, 2004												
R v Lohrer, [2004] 3 S.C.R. 732; 2004 SCC 80	December 10, 2004	December 10, 2004						V						
Martineau v MNR, [2004] 3 S.C.R. 737; 2004 SCC 81	October 14, 2004	December 16, 2004												

== Justices of the Supreme Court ==
Justice	Reasons written	Votes cast	% Majority
Chief Justice Beverley McLachlin	15 / 0 / 1 / 1 / Total=17	46 / 0 / 0 / 0 / Total=46	61 of 63 (96.83%)
Puisne Justice Charles Gonthier	2 / 0 / 0 / 0 / Total=02	1 / 0 / 0 / 0 / Total=01	3 of 3 (100%)
Puisne Justice Frank Iacobucci	7 / 0 / 0 / 0 / Total=07	33 / 0 / 1 / 1 / Total=35	40 of 42 (95.24%)
Puisne Justice John C. Major	11 / 0 / 1 / 1 / Total=13	53 / 0 / 0 / 1 / Total=54	64 of 67 (95.52%)
Puisne Justice Michel Bastarache	7 / 1 / 1 / 4 / Total=13	51 / 0 / 2 / 3 / Total=56	59 of 69 (85.51%)
Puisne Justice Ian Binnie	10 / 1 / 1 / 4 / Total=16	50 / 0 / 2 / 0 / Total=52	61 of 68 (89.71%)
Puisne Justice Louise Arbour	4 / 0 / 1 / 1 / Total=06	33 / 1 / 0 / 1 / Total=35	38 of 41 (92.68%)
Puisne Justice Louis LeBel	11 / 5 / 0 / 5 / Total=21	43 / 0 / 2 / 1 / Total=46	59 of 67 (88.06%)
Pusine Justice Marie Deschamps	7 / 0 / 2 / 3 / Total=12	49 / 3 / 1 / 3 / Total=56	59 of 68 (86.76%)
Puisne Justice Morris Fish	7 / 1 / 0 / 3 / Total=11	49 / 2 / 0 / 2 / Total=53	59 of 64 (92.19%)
Pusine Justice Rosalie Abella	0 / 0 / 0 / 0 / Total=00	6 / 0 / 0 / 0 / Total=06	6 of 6 (100%)
Pusine Justice Louise Charron	0 / 0 / 0 / 0 / Total=00	5 / 0 / 0 / 0 / Total=05	5 of 5 (100%)
Notes on statistics: A justice is only included in the majority if they have joined or concurred in the Court's judgment in full. Percentages are based only on the cases in which a justice participated, and are rounded to the nearest tenth of a percent.

== Table key ==
Delivered the Court's reason
Joined the Court's reason
Filed a concurrence
Joined a concurrence
Filed a dissent
Joined a dissent
Filed a concurrence/dissent
Joined a concurrence/dissent
Did not participate in the judgment
Did not participate in the final disposition of the judgment
Not a member of the Court at the time of hearing or delivering
- Decisions that do not note a Justice delivering the Court's reason are per coram.
- Multiple concurrences and dissents within a case are numbered, with joining votes numbered accordingly. Justices occasionally join multiple reasons in a single case; each vote is subdivided accordingly.
- Multiple unnumbered reasons are jointly written or delivered.
- Decisions that are given orally from the bench are denoted by a "V"; per coram decisions delivered orally from the bench only note a "V" on the most senior justice on the panel.
- An asterisk ( * ) in the Court's opinion denotes that it was only a majority in part or a plurality.
