= Entertainment Software Ass'n v Society of Composers, Authors and Music Publishers of Canada =

- Supreme Court of Canada

Hearing: December 6, 2011 Judgment: July 12, 2012
- Full case name: Entertainment Software Association v. Society of Composers, Authors and Music Publishers of Canada
- Citations: 2012 SCC 34, [2012] 2 SCR 231
- Docket No.: 33921
- Prior history: Appeal from the Federal Court of Appeal, 2010 FCA 221
- Ruling: Appeal allowed.

Court membership
- Chief Justice: Beverley McLachlin; Puisne Justices: Louis LeBel, Marie Deschamps, Morris Fish, Rosalie Abella, Marshall Rothstein, Thomas Cromwell, Michael Moldaver, Andromache Karakatsanis

Reasons given
- Majority: Abella and Moldaver JJ., joined by McLachlin C.J., Deschamps, and Karakatsanis JJ.
- Dissent: Rothstein J., joined by LeBel, Fish, and Cromwell JJ.

Entertainment Software Ass'n v Society of Composers, Authors and Music Publishers of Canada [2012] 2 SCR 231, 2012 SCC 32 is a landmark Supreme Court of Canada judgement that clarified the nature of and relationship between, the bundle of rights created for copyright owners under section 3(1) of the Copyright Act of Canada. In particular, the Supreme Court considered the relationship between the reproduction and communication rights under the Copyright Act, and applied the principle of technological neutrality to hold that downloading a work engaged only the reproduction right, and not the communication right.

This judgement is one of a series of five important and interrelated copyright law decisions that the Supreme Court released in 2012.

== Background ==
The Entertainment Software Association (ESA) is a coalition of video game publishers and distributors who enable their customers to download copies of video games over the internet. These games contain copyrighted musical works and are identical to the copies sold in stores or shipped to customers by mail. It is standard practice that video game publishers negotiate royalty fees for reproduction of the musical works with the copyright owners before the games are published. After negotiations, the copyright owners have no further rights once the game is sold, be it in a store or shipped to customers.

The Society of Composers, Authors and Music Publishers of Canada (SOCAN) is a collective society of composers, authors and publishers of music, which administers the right to communicate to the public by telecommunication the copyrighted works of its members. In 1995, SOCAN applied to the Copyright Board for a tariff covering downloads of musical works over the Internet. The tariff had been contested by various parties, and led to a previous judgment of the Supreme Court in Society of Composers, Authors and Music Publishers of Canada v. Canadian Assn. of Internet Providers.

The Copyright Board was tasked with determining which Internet-based acts engaged the rights of SOCAN's members under section 3(1) of the Copyright Act. Section 3(1) of the Copyright Act gives copyright owners:

the sole right to produce or reproduce the work or any substantial part thereof in any material form whatever, to perform the work or any substantial part thereof in public or, if the work is unpublished, to publish the work or any substantial part thereof, and includes the sole right....

Section 3(1) then lists additional subsections, including subsection (f) which reads, "in the case of any literary, dramatic, musical or artistic work, to communicate the work to the public by telecommunication." The term "communicate" is not defined in the Act.

The Copyright Board concluded that the download of a file containing a musical work is a communication to the public by telecommunication within the meaning of s. 3(1)(f). Therefore, SOCAN's members were entitled to compensation when publishers sold the video games over the internet despite the fact that royalties had already been negotiated.

=== Decision of the lower court ===
ESA appealed the Copyright Board's decision to the Federal Court of Appeal. ESA argued that a download was an additional, more efficient way of delivering copies of video games to customers and did not amount to "communicating" that game to the public by telecommunication under section 3(1)(f). SOCAN contended that copyright owners are entitled to compensation for communication of their works through internet downloads since reproduction and communication are different and independent rights under the Act. The Federal Court of Appeal affirmed the Copyright Board's decision that a download of a file containing a musical work is a communication to the public by telecommunication. ESA appealed to the Supreme Court of Canada.

== Judgment of the Supreme Court of Canada ==
The issue before the Supreme Court was whether the download of a video game through the internet is a "communication to the public" within the meaning of s. 3(1)(f) of the Act.

Justices Abella and Moldaver delivered the majority judgment of the Court in a five to four decision. The Court held that the download of a permanent copy of a video game containing musical works using the internet did not amount to a "communication" under section 3(1)(f) of the Act. The Court reversed the Copyright Board's decision that SOCAN's members were entitled to additional compensation for communication of their works through internet downloads.

=== Technological neutrality ===
In coming to this conclusion, the Court first reasoned that if a separate tariff for "communication" was applied to downloads containing musical works it would violate the principle of technological neutrality embodied nsection 3(1). The Court pinpointed the case of Robertson v. Thomson Corp. to highlight that the principle of technological neutrality "requires that the Copyright Act apply equally between traditional and more technologically advanced forms of the same media."

=== Double dipping ===
Absent evidence of Parliament's intent to the contrary, the principle required that the Copyright Act be interpreted to avoid "imposing an additional layer of protections and fees based solely on the method of delivery of the work to the end user." It was clear in the majority's reasoning that the internet was simply another, more efficient means of delivering the same end product that could be bought in a store or received through the mail. Since SOCAN had already been compensated by way of royalties, they were not entitled to additional compensation simply because the video games were being delivered over the internet rather than in physical form.

=== Legislative history ===
The Court then examined the legislative history of the Act. It reasoned that the communication right was "historically connected to the right to perform a work and not the right to reproduce permanent copies of the work." Justices Abella and Moldaver traced the development of section 3(1) of the Copyright Act starting at articles in the 1886 Berne Convention for the Protection of Literary and Artistic Works on which the original Copyright Act, 1921 was based. They then moved to the enactment of section 3(1)(f) of the 1931 Copyright Amendment Act. The Court ended at the last amendment to section 3(1)(f) in 1988.

By comparing the language used during the historical evolution of the Act and by also using evidence from legislative debates, the Court was able to conclude that the use of the word "telecommunication" did not fundamentally change the nature of the communication rights, it merely expanded the means of communicating a work. In the Court's eyes, the communication right was historically and still continues to be, a category of performance right and should not be transformed by the use of the word "telecommunication" to alter the traditional distinction in the Act between performance-based rights and rights of reproduction.

== Significance ==
In addition to clarifying the nature of the communication right under section 3(1)(f) as it relates to downloads over the internet, the Supreme Court also addressed the broader issue of the relationship between copyright owners' general rights under section 3(1) of the Act and the specific rights under the subsections of section 3(1). The Court held that the reproduction, performance and publishing rights in the introductory paragraph of section 3(1) provide the basic structure of copyright and the enumerated rights listed in the subsections are simply illustrations of the three broader rights. Therefore, the enumerated rights are not additional stand-alone rights; rather they are subcategories of the right to reproduce, to perform and to publish.

== Subsequent amendments to the Copyright Act ==
On November 7, 2012, the Copyright Modernization Act came into force. The Act amended the Copyright Act, adding in section 2.4(1.1) which dictates that a "communication of a work…to the public by telecommunication includes making it available to the public by telecommunication in a way that allows a member of the public to have access to it from a place and at a time individually chosen by that member of the public."

Based on the language of this provision it is open to question if the Supreme Court's holding is still good law. SOCAN has subsequently submitted to the Copyright Board that this section creates a new right. SOCAN believes that they are entitled to a new tariff independent of if and how the musical works are subsequently transmitted to end-users. The first round of responses to SOCAN's submissions is due April 5, 2013.

== See also ==
- List of Supreme Court of Canada cases (McLachlin Court)
- List of Supreme Court of Canada cases
- Rogers Communications Inc. v. Society of Composers, Authors and Music Publishers of Canada, 2012 SCC 35, a companion case clarifying the meaning of "communication to the public" in the context of online streaming music.
- Society of Composers, Authors and Music Publishers of Canada v. Bell Canada, 2012 SCC 36, a companion case clarifying fair dealing in the context of streamed music.
- Alberta (Education) v. Canadian Copyright Licensing Agency (Access Copyright), 2012 SCC 37, a companion case applying the fair dealing to photocopied textbooks in public schools.
- Re:Sound v. Motion Picture Theatre Associations of Canada, 2012 SCC 38, a companion case clarifying the definition of "sound recording" in the context of soundtracks of cinematographic works.
