= R v Patrick =

- Supreme Court of Canada

Hearing: October 10, 2008 Judgment: April 9, 2009
- Full case name: Her Majesty The Queen v Russell Stephen Patrick
- Citations: 2009 SCC 17, [2009] 1 SCR 579
- Docket No.: 32354
- Ruling: Appeal dismissed.

Holding
- Police have the right to take garbage bags placed for collection at edge of a property without warrant.

Court membership
- Chief Justice: Beverley McLachlin; Puisne Justices: Ian Binnie, Louis LeBel, Marie Deschamps, Morris Fish, Rosalie Abella, Louise Charron, Marshall Rothstein

Reasons given
- Majority: Binnie J.J. (paras. 1 - 75), joined by McLachin C.J., Fish, Charron, Lebel and Rothstein JJ.
- Concurrence: Abella JJ. (paras. 76 - 92)

Laws applied
- R. v. Tessling, [2004] 3 S.C.R. 432

R v Patrick, [2009] 1 S.C.R. 579, 2009 SCC 17 is a constitutional decision by the Supreme Court of Canada on the limits of police powers for search and seizure. The Court found that police have the right to take garbage bags placed for collection at edge of a property without warrant. In this case, the accused abandoned his privacy interest when he placed his garbage for collection at the rear of his property where it was accessible to any passing member of the public. His section 8 rights under the Canadian Charter of Rights and Freedoms were not violated when a police officer seized bags of garbage at the rear of his property and used the contents of seized bags as evidence of criminal activity.

== Summary ==
The police suspected that Patrick was operating an ecstasy lab in his home. On several occasions, they seized bags of garbage that Patrick had placed for collection at the rear of his property adjacent to a public alleyway. The police did not have to step onto P's property to retrieve the bags but they did have to reach through the airspace over his property line.

The police used evidence of criminal activity taken from the contents of P's garbage to obtain a warrant to search Patrick's house and garage. More evidence was seized during the search. At his trial, Patrick argued that the taking of his garbage bags by the police constituted a breach of his right guaranteed by s. 8 of the Canadian Charter of Rights and Freedoms to be free from unreasonable search and seizure.

The trial judge held that Patrick did not have a reasonable expectation of privacy in the items taken from his garbage and, therefore, the seizure of the garbage bags, the search warrant and the search of Patrick's dwelling were lawful. He admitted the evidence and convicted Patrick of unlawfully producing, possessing and trafficking in a controlled substance. A majority of the Court of Appeal upheld the convictions.

Held: The appeal should be dismissed.

== Lower Court Rulings ==
=== Trial Court ===
At his trial, the accused argued that the taking of his garbage bags by the police constituted a breach of his right guaranteed by section 8 to be free from unreasonable search and seizure. The trial judge held that the accused did not have a reasonable expectation of privacy in the items taken from his garbage and, therefore, the seizure of the garbage bags, the search warrant and the search of the accused's dwelling were lawful. He admitted the evidence and convicted the accused of unlawfully producing, possessing and trafficking in a controlled substance.

=== Court of Appeal ===
On appeal, the Court agreed with the trial judge and upheld the convictions.

== Supreme Court Ruling ==
The accused appealed to the Supreme Court. The following issues were put to the Court:

1. whether police breached accused's right to be free from unreasonable search or seizure
2. whether accused abandoned his privacy interest in contents of garbage bags when he placed them at edge of his property for collection.

The Court found that the police did not breach the accused's right to be free from unreasonable search and seizure and that the accused has abandoned his privacy interest when he placed his garbage for collection at the rear of his property where it was accessible to any passing member of the public. The accused did everything required to rid himself of the items taken as evidence. His conduct was incompatible with any reasonable expectation of confidentiality. Neither the search of the contents of the accused's garbage nor the subsequent search of his dwelling breached s. 8 of the Charter. Hence, the evidence seized in both searches was admissible at the accused's trial and should not be excluded under section 24(2) of the Charter.

=== Expectation of privacy standard ===
Expectation of privacy is a normative standard. Privacy analysis is laden with value judgments which are made from the independent perspective of the reasonable and informed person who is concerned about the long‑term consequences of government action for the protection of privacy.

In assessing the reasonableness of a claimed privacy interest, the Court is to look at the “totality of the circumstances”, and this is so whether the claim involves aspects of personal privacy, territorial privacy, or informational privacy. Frequently the claimant will assert overlapping interests. The assessment always requires close attention to context and first involves an analysis of the nature or subject matter of the evidence in issue.

The reasonableness of an expectation of privacy varies with :

- the nature of the matter sought to be protected,
- the circumstances in which and the place where state intrusion occurs,
- and the purposes of the intrusion.

In this case, the accused's garbage was put out for collection in the customary location for removal at or near his property line and there was no manifestation of a continuing assertion of privacy or control. Territorial privacy is implicated in this case because the police reached across the accused's property line to seize the bags; however, the physical intrusion by the police was relatively peripheral and, viewed in context, is better seen as pertaining to a claim of informational privacy. The accused's concern was with the concealed contents of the garbage bags which, unlike the bags, were clearly not in public view.

=== Abandonment ===
Abandonment is a conclusion inferred from the conduct of the individual claiming the s. 8 right that he or she had ceased to have a reasonable expectation of privacy with regard to it at the time it was taken by the police or other state authority. Being an inference from the claimant's own conduct, a finding of abandonment must relate to something done or not done by that individual, and not to anything done or not done by the garbage collectors, the police or anyone else involved in the subsequent collection and treatment of the "bag of information".

The accused abandoned his privacy interest in the information when he placed the garbage bags for collection at the back of his property adjacent to the lot line. He had done everything required of him to commit the bags to the municipal collection system. Since the accused had abandoned his garbage before it was seized by the police, he had no subsisting privacy interest at the time it was seized. The police conduct was objectively reasonable. The accused's lifestyle and biographical information was exposed, but the effective cause of the exposure was the act of abandonment by the accused, not an intrusion by the police into a subsisting privacy interest.

== See also ==
- List of Supreme Court of Canada cases (McLachlin Court)
