= Charlebois v Saint John (City of) =

- Supreme Court of Canada

Hearing: Argued October 20, 2005 Judgment: Decided December 15, 2005
- Full case name: Mario Charlebois v. City of Saint John and Association des juristes d'expression française du Nouveau‑Brunswick v. City of Saint John
- Citations: [2005] 3 S.C.R. 563; 2005 SCC 74 (CanLII)
- Prior history: Judgement for the City in the Court of Appeal for New Brunswick

Holding
- A municipality is not an institution for the purposes of the provincial Official Languages Act.

Court membership
- Chief Justice: Beverley McLachlin; Puisne Justices: Michel Bastarache, Ian Binnie, Louis LeBel, Marie Deschamps, Morris Fish, Rosalie Abella, Louise Charron

Reasons given
- Majority: Charron, joined by McLachlin, Major, Fish and Abella
- Dissent: Bastarache, joined by Binnie, LeBel and Deschamps

Charlebois v Saint John (City of) [2005] 3 S.C.R. 563 was a decision by the Supreme Court of Canada on minority language rights in New Brunswick. The Court found no statutory obligation on municipalities for bilingualism in court proceedings.

== Background ==
Mario Charlebois challenged the city of Saint John for not using the French language in court proceedings. He maintained that the failure to provide bilingual services was a violation of Section 22 of the provincial Official Languages Act, which states that bilingual services should be provided by all institutions of the provincial government—which raised the question of whether a municipality is, legally speaking, a provincial institution.

Both the trial judge and the New Brunswick Court of Appeal decided municipalities are not institutions. The Court of Appeal and Supreme Court found the definition of an "institution" is an institution which under legislation has a function related to government. This definition excludes municipalities, which are corporations, incorporated under provincial law.

Charlebois also challenged English-only municipal laws and won his case before the Court of Appeal with arguments regarding section 18, section 16, and section 16.1 of the Canadian Charter of Rights and Freedoms. The Court of Appeal decision is also known as Charlebois v Mowat et ville de Moncton. The government of New Brunswick said it would not appeal this decision and instead provided the affected municipalities with the funds needed to provide French-language versions of their municipal statutes.

== Decision ==
Justice Louise Charron emphasized in her opinion that the majority would not consider constitutional issues but rather just the statutes and whether the municipality should have used French in the courts, and she found against Charlebois. Charron noted that in terms of constitutional law and section 16 of the Charter, municipalities were deemed institutions by the Court of Appeal. However, she decided that the Court of Appeal's decision related more to section 18 of the Charter and the commentary on section 16 and institutions was thus obiter dictum. She thus turned back to the definition of an institution according to statutes. Looking at the Official Languages Act, Charron found that a municipality is considered to be an entity separate from institutions and each has different language responsibilities. The responsibilities for municipalities are more limited than those held by other institutions, and while the defendant in quasi-criminal law will have the choice as to what language is used, this is not necessarily true of civil proceedings. While the Charter of Rights could encourage a liberal reading of the law if the law is uncertain, Charron found that in this case the law was clear.

== See also ==
- List of Supreme Court of Canada cases (McLachlin Court)
