= Pro Swing Inc v Elta Golf Inc =

- Supreme Court of Canada

Hearing: December 15, 2005 Judgment: November 17, 2006
- Citations: 2006 SCC 52
- Docket No.: 30529
- Ruling: appeal dismissed

Court membership
- Chief Justice: Beverley McLachlin; Puisne Justices: Michel Bastarache, Ian Binnie, Louis LeBel, Marie Deschamps, Morris Fish, Rosalie Abella, Louise Charron

Reasons given
- Majority: Deschamps J, joined by LeBel, Fish and Abella JJ
- Dissent: McLachlin CJ, joined by Bastarache and Charron JJ

Laws applied
- Morguard Investments Ltd v De Savoye, [1990] 3 SCR 1077

Pro Swing Inc v Elta Golf Inc 2006 SCC 52 is a leading Canadian case decided by the Supreme Court of Canada on conflict of laws. The Court held that foreign non-monetary judgments may be enforced in Canada where they have been rendered by a court of competent jurisdiction, the rendering is final, and the nature of the judgment is such that comity requires it to be enforced.

== Background ==
Pro Swing is an American company that sells golf equipment under the "trident" trademark. Elta Golf is an Ontario company that sells golf equipment that includes products with a trade-mark similar to that of the "trident".

Pro Swing sued for trade-mark infringement in Ohio. A settlement was reached which ordered Elta Golf to refrain from selling any products with the trident logo.

In 2002, Pro Swing filed to an Ohio court for contempt of court for Elta's breach of the settlement. The court granted the order. Pro Swing then filed in the Ontario Superior Court of Justice for enforcement of the order.

The motions judge found that the non-monetary order was valid but found certain parts duplicative and had them severed from the order.

On appeal to the Court of Appeal for Ontario, the court found the order was unenforceable due to ambiguity in the order regarding its scope of application.

== Opinion of the Court ==
Justice Deschamps wrote the majority opinion. She ordered the appeal dismissed.

The old rule for foreign judgments required that they be final, conclusive, and for a monetary amount. Deschamps found this rule to be outdated and stated that a new rule for non-monetary orders based on comity was needed.

She proposed that non-monetary judgments should be enforced when

1. judgment is rendered by a court of competent jurisdiction
2. the judgment is final
3. the nature of the judgment is such that comity requires enforcements.

On the current facts she found the order unenforceable. The contempt order is quasi-criminal which should never be enforced. This public law element eclipses any other private law element. She further advised in obiter that courts should ensure there will be no conflict once the order is rendered and should not allow punishments that are not available under the foreign jurisdiction.

== Dissent ==
McLachlin, in dissent, argued that incremental change was a preferable approach. The standard should be based on comity, order, and fairness.

When assessing an application, the court should not look at the judgment's merits. The only restrictions upon enforcement of foreign non-monetary judgments should be:

1. issue court does not have jurisdiction
2. where non-monetary orders are not final or clear
3. where the order is criminal in nature

== See also ==
- List of Supreme Court of Canada cases (McLachlin Court)
- List of Supreme Court of Canada cases
