= R v Krymowski =

- Supreme Court of Canada

Hearing: November 8, 2004 Judgment: February 24, 2005
- Full case name: Her Majesty The Queen v Krystopher Krymowski, Ryan Douglas Marshall, Quinn Mason McFarlane, Michael Peter Schultz, J.J.V. and A.M.V
- Citations: 2005 SCC 7, [2005] 1 SCR 101, 249 DLR (4th) 28, 193 CCC (3d) 129, 26 CR (6th) 207, 195 OAC 341
- Docket No.: 29865
- Prior history: Judgment for the accused in the Court of Appeal for Ontario
- Ruling: Acquittals set aside and new trials ordered

Holding
- The trial judge erred by failing to consider the totality of the evidence in a hate speech case under the Criminal Code

Court membership
- Chief Justice: Beverley McLachlin; Puisne Justices: John C. Major, Michel Bastarache, Ian Binnie, Louis LeBel, Marie Deschamps, Morris Fish, Rosalie Abella, Louise Charron

Reasons given
- Unanimous reasons by: Charron J

Laws applied
- Criminal Code, s. 319(2)

R v Krymowski [2005] 1 S.C.R. 101, 2005 SCC 7 is a decision by the Supreme Court of Canada, interpreting the Criminal Code offence of wilful promotion of hatred. On a Crown appeal, the Court unanimously held that the offence could apply to individuals protesting the presence in Canada of Roma people (also known as "Gypsies"). The Court held that the trial judge had taken too strict an approach in distinguishing the term "Gypsies", used by the protestors, from the Crown's charge, which used the term "Roma". The Court set aside the acquittals of the seven accused and remitted the matter for a new trial.

== Background ==
In the summer of 1997, a group of Roma people were admitted into Canada, seeking refugee status. While their refugee claim was being reviewed, the group was lodged in a motel in Scarborough, Ontario. On August 26, 1997, a group of around twenty-five people staged a protest in front of the motel. Protesters held signs that said, for example, "Honk if you hate Gypsies", "Canada is not a Trash Can", and "G.S.T. — Gypsies Suck Taxes". They also chanted statements such as "Gypsies Out", "How do you like Canada now?" and "White power". Some of the protestors gave the Nazi "Sieg Heil" salute, some waved Nazi and American Confederate flags, and some wore clothing, accessories and footwear which were described as typical "Skinhead" gear.

== Charges and trial ==
Four months later, after intense public lobbying by pressure groups, the homes of a number of people believed to have been involved in the demonstration were raided by police. Seven people were charged with wilful promotion of hatred against an "identifiable group", a crime under s. 319 of the Criminal Code. All persons charged ranged in age from 15 to 20. No public official or members of the media or police were charged.

== Lower court appeals ==
Both the Superior Court of Ontario and later the Court of Appeal for Ontario upheld the acquittals. The Court of Appeal found that "the term gypsy in its broadest sense is often used to refer to people who lead a nomadic life" and "conjures up unflattering or stereotypical images". At the Court of Appeal, the Crown conceded that "not all people who are referred to as gypsies are in fact Roma".

== Appeal to the Supreme Court ==
The court overturned the dismissal and held, "The appeal should be allowed. The acquittals are set aside and new trials ordered." The defence filed a motion for a re-hearing of the appeal. The motion was dismissed, without reasons.

=== Reasons of the Supreme Court ===
The decision of the Court was written by Justice Louise Charron. She first observed that in R v Keegstra, the Supreme Court had already held that the hate speech law was constitutional.

Charron faulted the trial finding as too focussed on the terms "Roma" and "Gypsies," and not on the general question of whether the protesters were attempting to promote hatred of the Roma. Charron emphasized the importance of studying the "totality of the evidence" and drawing reasonable conclusions to determine whether a group was subject to hate speech.

== See also ==
- List of Supreme Court of Canada cases (McLachlin Court)
