= Masterpiece Inc. v. Alavida Lifestyles Inc. =

- Supreme Court of Canada

Hearing: December 8, 2010 Judgment: May 26, 2011
- Full case name: Masterpiece Inc. v. Alavida Lifestyles Inc.
- Citations: 2011 SCC 27, [2011] 2 S.C.R. 387
- Docket No.: 33459
- Prior history: Masterpiece Inc. denied appeal at the Federal Court and the Federal Court of Appeal.
- Ruling: The appeal should be allowed and Alavida's registration should be expunged.

Holding
- The trade-mark was deemed confusing from the perspective of the casual consumer upon first encountering the trade-mark.

Court membership
- Chief Justice: Beverley McLachlin; Puisne Justices: Ian Binnie, Louis LeBel, Marie Deschamps, Morris Fish, Rosalie Abella, Louise Charron, Marshall Rothstein, Thomas Cromwell

Reasons given
- Majority: Rothstein J., joined by McLachlin C.J., Binnie, LeBel, Fish, Charron, Rothstein and Cromwell JJ

Laws applied
- Trade-marks Act, R.S.C., 1985, s.6(5), s.16

Masterpiece Inc. v. Alavida Lifestyles Inc. [2011] 2 S.C.R. 387, 2011 SCC 27, is a Supreme Court of Canada decision concerning the relevant criteria and basic approach to be undertaken by the Court in analyzing the likelihood of confusion in Canadian trademark law under the Trade-marks Act, 1985 The test adopted by the Supreme Court of Canada is whether, as a matter of first impression, the "casual consumer somewhat in a hurry" who encounters the Alavida trade-mark, with no more than an imperfect recollection of any one of the Masterpiece Inc. trade-marks or trade-name, would be likely to think that Alavida was the same source of retirement residence services as Masterpiece Inc. Furthermore, Rothstein J. affirmed a consumer protection principle of trade-marks as an indication of provenance, "providing consumers with a reliable indication of the expected source of wares or services." Rothstein J. delivering the majority judgment of the Court held that Alavida's proposed trade-mark "Masterpiece Living" was confusing with at least one of Masterpiece Inc.'s trade-marks when the registration application was filed on December 1, 2005. Alavida was therefore deemed to be not entitled to registration of its proposed marks, allowing then for the Registrar of Trade-marks to expunge Alavida's registration from the registrar.

== Background and Facts ==
Masterpiece Inc. and Alavida Lifestyles Inc. were both involved in the retirement residence business, with the former operating in Alberta, and the latter in Ontario. Prior to December 2005, Masterpiece Inc. used several trade-marks which included the word "Masterpiece", as well as its trade-name "Masterpiece Inc." Masterpiece Inc. (incorporated in 2001) undertook the construction of retirement residences in Alberta during the relevant period of 2001 to 2005, operating under its corporate name of Masterpiece Inc. as a trade-name. Moreover, Masterpiece Inc. used several unregistered trade-marks, including the "Masterpiece the Art of Living," and "Masterpiece the Art of Retirement Living." Alavida Inc. was incorporated on August 4, 2005, and applied to register the trade-mark "Masterpiece Living" on December 1, 2005, on the basis of proposed use. The mark was registered unopposed on March 23, 2007, and Alavida has used the trade-mark since January 2006. Masterpiece Inc. applied to register "Masterpiece" as a trade-mark (January 2006) and applied to register the trade-mark "Masterpiece Living" (June 2006). Prior application by Alavida resulted in the denial by the Registrar of both the trade-mark applications submitted by Masterpiece Inc. On March 16, 2007, Masterpiece Inc. applied to expunge Alavida's registration.

=== The Federal Court and The Federal Court of Appeal ===
O'Reilly J. at the Federal Court dismissed Masterpiece Inc.'s application to expunge the Alavida trade-mark. The trial judge observed that since the choice of retirement residence was an "important and expensive decision," consumers could be expected to research their decisions carefully, thereby reducing the likelihood of confusion. The trial judge found that Masterpiece Inc. had not satisfied the likelihood of confusion considerations. The Federal Court of Appeal also dismissed Masterpiece Inc.'s appeal and generally agreed with the trial judge's approach to the confusion assessment. In both courts, the relevant date for confusion analysis was the date of filing of Alavida's trade-mark application (December 1, 2005).

== The Supreme Court of Canada ==
=== Issues on Appeal to the Supreme Court ===
1. Is the location where a mark is used relevant when considering the likelihood of confusion between an applied for or registered trade-mark and a prior unregistered trade-mark or trade-name?

2. What considerations are applicable in the assessment of the resemblance between a proposed use trade-mark and an existing unregistered trade-mark?

3. When considering the "nature of the trade" under s.6(5)of the Trade-marks Act, what effect does the nature and cost of the wares or services have on the confusion analysis?

4. When should courts take into account expert evidence in trade-mark or trade-name confusion cases?

=== Opinion of the Supreme Court of Canada ===
==== 1. The relevance of the location where a mark is used ====
The Supreme Court of Canada held that the location where the marks were actually used is not relevant. First, the test for confusion is premised upon the hypothetical assumption that the trade-names and trade-marks are used in the "same area", pursuant to s.6(3). Moreover, in order to have "exclusive use" of a registered trade-mark throughout Canada there cannot be a likelihood of confusion with another trade-mark anywhere in the country, regardless of whether the trade-marks are actually used in the "same area."

==== 2. Considerations to be applied by the Court in assessing resemblance ====
The Court affirmed that it is use, and not the registration of the trade-mark itself that confers priority of title and the exclusive right to the trade-mark. The granting of rights to the first-user manifested under the Trade-Marks Act in two areas pursuant to s.16: i) first use of the trademark furnishes a priority right to registration; ii) the first user right to oppose the application or, as in the present case, apply to expunge registrations based on prior use. Therefore, the remedy of applying to expunge Alavida's registration of the trade-mark was available to Masterpiece Inc. In addressing the core question of whether there was confusion between Alavida's and Masterpiece Inc.'s trade-marks in terms of S.6, the Court laid out the general approach to be applied: the casual consumer somewhat in hurry. The Court reiterated this traditional test articulated by Binnie J. in Veuve Clicquot Ponsardin v. Boutiques Clicquot Ltee [2006] 1 S.C.R. 824,: "the test to be applied is a matter of first impression in the mind of the casual consumer somewhat in a hurry who sees the [mark], at a time when he or she has no more than an imperfect recollection of the [prior] trade-marks." Furthermore, the Court affirmed the necessity to consider each mark separately under s.16(3), such that even one confusingly similar trade-mark will invalidate the registration. Moreover, the Supreme Court recommended beginning with the final factor in s.6(5) of "degree of resemblance" when testing for resemblance.

==== 3. The effect of the nature and cost of the wares and services ====
The Supreme Court acknowledges that consumers in the market for expensive goods (such as selecting a retirement resident in the present case) may be less likely to be confused upon encountering a trade-mark, however the test is one of "first impression." The Court found that the trial judge it was an error by the trial judge "to discount the likelihood of confusion by considering what actions the consumer might take after encountering a mark in the marketplace." As Rothstein J. for the majority Supreme Court judgment states: "That cannot mean that consumers of expensive goods, through their own caution and wariness, should lose the benefit of trade-mark protection." Rather, the Court affirmed an approach that any subsequent research or consequent purchase, which are instances that occur after the consumer has first encountered the trade-mark in the marketplace, are irrelevant to the determination of confusion under s.6(5) of the Trade-marks Act. The likelihood of confusion analysis under s.6(5) was limited to the consideration of the first impression of the consumer when encountering the trademark: "how a consumer, upon encountering the Alavida mark in the marketplace, with an imperfect recollection of the Masterpiece Inc. mark, would have reacted."

==== 4. Reliance on expert evidence by the Court in the trade-mark confusion analysis ====
Expert evidence that simply assesses resemblance will not usually be necessary where the "casual consumer" is not particularly knowledgeable and there is a resemblance between the marks. Judges should resort to expert testimony where it is beyond the scope of the judge's experience and knowledge.

== See also ==
- List of Supreme Court of Canada cases (McLachlin Court)
