= Grant v Torstar Corp =

- Supreme Court of Canada

Hearing: April 23, 2009 Judgment: December 22, 2009
- Full case name: Peter Grant v Torstar Corporation
- Citations: 2009 SCC 61
- Prior history: APPEAL and CROSS‑APPEAL from a judgment of the Ontario Court of Appeal (Rosenberg, Feldman and Simmons JJ.A.), Grant v. Torstar Corporation, 2008 ONCA 796, 92 OR (3d) 561, 301 DLR (4th) 129, 243 OAC 120, 61 CCLT (3d) 195, 71 CPR (4th) 352, [2008] OJ No 4783 (QL), 2008 CarswellOnt 7155, setting aside a decision of Rivard J. and a jury award and ordering a new trial.
- Ruling: Appeal and cross-appeal dismissed

Court membership
- Chief Justice: Beverley McLachlin; Puisne Justices: Ian Binnie, Louis LeBel, Marie Deschamps, Morris Fish, Rosalie Abella, Louise Charron, Marshall Rothstein, Thomas Cromwell

Reasons given
- Majority: McLachlin, joined by Binnie, LeBel, Deschamps, Fish, Charron, Rothstein and Cromwell.
- Concur/dissent: Abella.

Grant v Torstar Corp [2009] S.C.R., 2009 SCC 61 is a 2009 Supreme Court of Canada decision on the defences to the tort of defamation. The Supreme Court ruled that the law of defamation should give way to the rights of a party to speak on matters of public interest, provided the party exercises a certain level of responsibility in verifying the potentially defamatory facts. This decision recognizes a defence of responsible communication on matters of public interest.

== Background ==
The Toronto Star newspaper published a story concerning the proposed expansion of the Frog's Breath private golf course, built on a property owned by the plaintiff, Peter Grant, that was located on the shore of Twin Lakes near New Liskeard, Ontario. The story contained comments from local residents that were critical of Grant, alleging that he was using his political influence to gain permission to expand the golf course from three holes to nine holes. In particular, one resident claimed that the decision to allow the golf course was a "done deal". Prior to publication, the newspaper contacted Grant for comment, but he declined. After the article was published, Grant sued the newspaper's parent company Torstar Corporation for defamation.

== Summary ==
Grant and his company brought a libel action against a newspaper and reporter after an article was published concerning a proposed private golf course development on Grant's’s lakefront estate. The story aired the views of local residents who were critical of the development’s environmental impact and suspicious that G was exercising political influence behind the scenes to secure government approval for the new golf course. The article quoted a neighbour who said that “[e]veryone thinks it’s a done deal” because of G’s influence.

The reporter, an experienced journalist, attempted to verify the allegations in the article, including asking G for comment, which G chose not to provide. At trial, without rejecting the possibility of an expanded qualified privilege defence based on a concept of public interest responsible journalism, the trial judge ruled that the defence would not apply in these circumstances and the case went to the jury essentially on the defences of truth and fair comment. The jury rejected these defences and awarded the plaintiffs general, aggravated and punitive damages.

The Court of Appeal concluded that the trial judge had erred in failing to leave the new responsible journalism defence with the jury. It also concluded that the jury instructions were flawed, and ordered a new trial.

Grant and his company appealed to reinstate the jury verdict. The newspaper defendants cross‑appealed, asking the Court to apply the new defence in this case, and dismiss the action. In the alternative, they asked the Court to dismiss the action on the basis of fair comment.

Held: The appeal and the cross‑appeal should be dismissed.

== The courts below ==
=== Trial court ===
Torstar argued that the paper presented the concerns of local residents without making any claims of impropriety by Grant, as well as "an expanded qualified privilege defence based on a concept of public interest responsible journalism." The Court did not allow the defence of responsible journalism to be considered by the jury, leaving it to determine whether the Star engaged in "fair comment". The instructions to the jury, however, stated that the defendants would be guilty if the comment would not be held by a "fair-minded" person. The jury found the defendants guilty of libel, and awarded general, aggravated, and punitive damages in the amount of $1.475 million.

=== Court of Appeal for Ontario ===
Torstar appealed to the Court of Appeal for Ontario. On the issue of responsible journalism, the Court of Appeal found that the trial court erred in not allowing the jury to consider the defence, and remanded the case for a new trial. The Court also found that the idea of a "fair-minded" person would need to believe in a comment was previously rejected by the court, thus the trial court did not properly instruct the jury on this issue. Finally, the Court found that the defamatory comments in the article were attributed to a resident, and unless the defendants had adopted them as their own, the defendants' "honest belief" in them was irrelevant.

== Supreme Court of Canada ruling ==
Grant appealed to the Supreme Court of Canada. The court dismissed the appeal and the cross-appeal, with only Justice Abella dissenting in part from the decision.

The Court first recognized that the tort of defamation places limits on freedom of expression guaranteed under section 2(b) of the Charter of Rights and Freedoms, but that limit should not go as far as to place a "chill" on expression.

It then determined that four issues needed to be resolved:

1. Should the common law provide a defence based on responsible communication in the public interest?
2. If so, what are the elements of the new defence?
3. If so, what procedures should apply? In particular, what are the respective roles of the judge and jury?
4. Application to the case at bar
  1. Fair comment
  2. Responsible communication

=== Responsible communication defence ===
Speaking for the majority, Chief Justice McLachlin found that the defence should exist so as to not restrict speech. She found that the defence helped to strike the proper balance between rights of free expression, as protected in the Charter, and the rights of privacy and protection of reputation. She also found justification in the ruling supported by the emerging recognition given to the defence in other common law states.

=== Elements of the defence ===
First, McLachlin stated that the defence of responsible communication was a new defence, and not a modification of qualified privilege. She then ruled that defence should be known as "responsible communication", as it is not only journalists who should benefit from the defence, but bloggers and other people who disseminate information regardless of their status in established media.

McLachlin found that two conditions must be met for the defence of responsible communication to apply:

- The matter must be one of public interest.
- The defendant must show that he acted responsibly, in that he showed diligence in attempting to verify the allegedly defamatory comments, having regard to the totality of the circumstances.

In determining whether the defendant acted responsibly, she found a court should consider:

- The seriousness of the allegation
- The public importance of the matter
- The urgency of the matter
- The status and reliability of the source
- Whether the plaintiff's side of the story was sought and accurately reported
- Whether inclusion of the defamatory statement was justifiable
- Whether the defamatory statement's public interest lay in the fact that it was made rather than its truth ("Reportage")

She noted that this list was not exhaustive, but served merely as a guideline. A court is free to consider other factors as well. As well, the factors should not all be given equal weight.

=== Roles of judge and jury ===
McLachlin ruled that the judge is to determine whether the matter is one of public interest. Recognizing that this may involve factual determination, she nonetheless ruled that the judge was serving as a sort of "gatekeeper" in determining whether the defence should be allowed.

The jury was left the role to determine whether a particular defamatory statement was needed to determine whether a defendant acted responsibly when he published it.

=== Application ===
McLachlin ruled that the three defences of justification, fair comment, and responsible communication should have been left to a jury. As a result, she remanded the case for a new trial.

=== Dissent ===
Justice Abella concurred in part and dissented in part. She agreed with the majority ruling that a defence of "responsible communication" should be available in Canadian defamation law. However, she dissented as to the division of roles between the judge and the jury. In her opinion, the inquiry as to the availability of the defence was for the judge alone.

== Aftermath ==
The Supreme Court decision was a landmark decision in Canadian libel law.

By the time the case was decided by the Supreme Court, Peter Grant's company, Grant Forest Products, had gone into bankruptcy protection as a result of the downturn in the American housing market during the subprime mortgage crisis. Since the property at issue in this case was owned by the company, it was put up for sale to pay off Grant Forest Products's creditors.

== See also ==
- Full text of Supreme Court of Canada decision available at LexUM and CanLII
- List of Supreme Court of Canada cases (McLachlin Court)
- New York Times Co v Sullivan, 376 US 254, a similar case in the United States whose broad grant of free speech has been rejected by the Canadian courts.
- Reynolds v Times Newspapers Ltd, [1999] 4 All ER 609, a similar case in the United Kingdom
- Dean Jobb, The Responsible Journalism Defence: What's in it for Journalists? J-Source: The Canadian Journalism Project
