= EB v Order of the Oblates of Mary Immaculate in the Province of British Columbia =

- Supreme Court of Canada

Hearing: 7 December 2004 Judgment: 28 October 2005
- Citations: 2005 SCC 60
- Docket No.: 29890
- Prior history: APPEAL from B.(E.) v. Order of the Oblates of Mary Immaculate, 2003 BCCA 289 (15 May 2003), setting aside B. (E.) v. Order of Oblates, 2001 BCSC 1783 (19 December 2001)
- Ruling: Appeal dismissed

Court membership
- Chief Justice: Beverley McLachlin; Puisne Justices: John C. Major, Michel Bastarache, Ian Binnie, Louis LeBel, Marie Deschamps, Morris Fish, Rosalie Abella, Louise Charron

Reasons given
- Majority: Binnie J, joined by McLachlin CJ and Major, Bastarache, LeBel, Deschamps, Fish and Charron JJ
- Dissent: Abella J

E.B. v. Order of the Oblates of Mary Immaculate in the Province of British Columbia, [2005] 3 SCR 45; 2005 SCC 60 is a leading case decided by the Supreme Court of Canada on vicarious liability in employment law and on the application of Bazley v Curry. The Court held that a residential school could not be held liable for the sexual assaults committed by a support staff member because there was not enough connection between the employee's position and the risk of harm.

== See also ==
- List of Supreme Court of Canada cases (McLachlin Court)
