= R v Turcotte =

- Supreme Court of Canada

Hearing: May 10, 2005 Judgment: September 30, 2005
- Full case name: Her Majesty the Queen v Thomas Turcotte
- Citations: [2005] 2 S.C.R. 519, 2005 SCC 50, 200 C.C.C. (3d) 289, 31 C.R. (6th) 197

Court membership
- Chief Justice: Beverley McLachlin; Puisne Justices: John C. Major, Michel Bastarache, Ian Binnie, Louis LeBel, Marie Deschamps, Morris Fish, Rosalie Abella, Louise Charron

Reasons given
- Unanimous reasons by: Abella

R v Turcotte, [2005] 2 S.C.R. 519, 2005 SCC 50 is a leading Supreme Court of Canada decision on the common law, and Canadian Charter of Rights and Freedoms right to silence and the conditions to waive that right.

== Background ==
Three men who worked at a ranch in British Columbia, identified as Terry Price, Kim Martindale, and Andy Heikkila, were murdered with an axe. Thomas Turcotte, a work-hand at the ranch, claimed to have found the bodies of the three men but denied killing them. He went to the police to tell them to send someone to the ranch, but he would not explain why, even at the insistence of the police. When the bodies were found Turcotte was charged with murder.

At trial the judge instructed the jury that his silence was admissible as evidence of "post-offence conduct", from which guilt could be inferred. All of the evidence was circumstantial, but Turcotte was found guilty of three counts of second degree murder.

The defence appealed on the grounds that silence could not be "post-offence conduct". The British Columbia Court of Appeal agreed and overturned the conviction.

== Opinion of the Court ==
Justice Rosalie Abella wrote the decision of the unanimous Court. She held that silence could not be part of "post-offence conduct" and ordered a new trial. She noted that to allow such evidence would make the right to silence hollow of meaning.

On the issue of whether Turcotte had waived his right to silence, Abella found that he had not. "The right to choose whether to speak is retained throughout the interaction." Thus, the right remains even when the accused agrees to answer some questions but not others.

"Post-offence conduct" must provide some circumstantial evidence of guilt. The law does not impose any duty to speak and so any refusal to do so cannot imply guilt. Consequently, silence can rarely be admitted as evidence of post-offence conduct.

== See also ==
- List of Supreme Court of Canada cases (McLachlin Court)
