= Montréal (City of) v 2952-1366 Québec Inc =

- Supreme Court of Canada

Hearing: October 14, 2004 Judgment: November 3, 2005
- Full case name: City of Montreal, Appellant v 2952‑1366 Québec Inc., Respondent, with Attorney General of Ontario, Intervener
- Citations: [2005] 3 S.C.R. 141, 2005 SCC 62

Holding
- The scope of the right to freedom of expression is location-dependent. Law prohibiting noise in street justified under section 1.

Court membership
- Chief Justice: Beverley McLachlin; Puisne Justices: John C. Major, Michel Bastarache, Ian Binnie, Louis LeBel, Marie Deschamps, Morris Fish, Rosalie Abella, Louise Charron

Reasons given
- Majority opinion by: McLachlin C.J. and Deschamps J. Joined by: Bastarache, LeBel, Abella and Charron JJ. Dissent by: Binnie J.

Montréal (City of) v 2952-1366 Québec Inc, [2005] 3 S.C.R. 141, 2005 SCC 62 is a leading Supreme Court of Canada decision on freedom of expression under section 2(b) of the Canadian Charter of Rights and Freedoms. The Court held that a strip club has no constitutional right to broadcast music into public streets in order to attract customers. The decision stated that location of the expression was a factor in considering if there was a violation.

== Background ==
In 1996, the owner of a Montreal strip club on Ste‑Catherine Street was charged for violating a Montreal by-law which prohibited "noise produced by sound equipment". The owner challenged the charge on the grounds that the municipal law was a violation of his freedom of expression under section 2(b) of the Charter.

Both the Quebec Superior Court and the Quebec Court of Appeal agreed that the law violated the freedom of expression and could not be saved under section 1 of the Charter.

The following issues were put to the Supreme Court:

1. Does the municipality have the power to enact the law?
2. Does the by-law Infringe Section 2(b) of the Canadian Charter?

In a six to one decision the Court found that the by-law was valid, that it violated the freedom of expression, but was saved under section 1.

== Opinion of the Court ==
Chief Justice McLachlin and Justice Deschamps wrote the decision for the majority. In their decision they examined the scope of the freedom of expression and added that the location of the expression was relevant to a finding of a violation. In the current situation, there was a violation.

The violation was found to be justified under section 1. They held that the purpose of controlling noise pollution was a sufficiently important purpose and the means available were reasonable.

== See also ==
- List of Supreme Court of Canada cases (McLachlin Court)
