= Miazga v Kvello Estate =

- Supreme Court of Canada

Hearing: December 12, 2008 Judgment: November 6, 2009
- Full case name: Mathew Miazga v Estate of Dennis Kvello (by his personal representative, Diane Kvello), Diane Kvello, S.K.1, S.K.2, Kari Klassen, Richard Klassen, Pamela Sharpe, Estate of Marie Klassen (by her personal representative, Peter Dale Klassen), John Klassen, Myrna Klassen, Peter Dale Klassen and Anita Janine Klassen
- Citations: 2009 SCC 51
- Docket No.: 32209
- Prior history: Judgment for plaintiffs in the Court of Appeal for Saskatchewan
- Ruling: Appeal allowed

Holding
- Prior decisions on four required elements for the tort of malicious prosecution upheld, but modified for public prosecutors: 1) public prosecutors are not required to have a subjective belief that an accused person is guilty, and 2) a lack of reasonable and probable grounds does not create an inference that a public prosecutor had malicious intent.

Court membership
- Chief Justice: Beverley McLachlin; Puisne Justices: Ian Binnie, Louis LeBel, Marie Deschamps, Morris Fish, Rosalie Abella, Louise Charron, Marshall Rothstein

Reasons given
- Unanimous reasons by: Charron J.

Miazga v Kvello Estate [2009] S.C.R., 2009 SCC 51 is a leading decision of the Supreme Court of Canada on how the tort of malicious prosecution applies to Crown attorneys and other public prosecutors. Specifically, the court held that there is no requirement for a public prosecutor to have a subjective belief that an accused person is actually guilty. Nor can there be a presumption of malice from a lack of reasonable and probable grounds.

== Background ==
=== Criminal proceedings ===
In 1991, Matthew Miazga, a Crown prosecutor in Saskatchewan was asked to give pre-charge advice to police officers investigating a case of child abuse. Specifically, three siblings were making serious and bizarre claims of sexual abuse against their biological parents, their mother's boyfriend, their foster parents, Anita and Dale Klassen, and members of the Klassens' extended family. Eventually, the Klassens and their family were charged with approximately 70 counts of sexual assault. Miazga remained assigned as the trial prosecutor.

During the course of the trial proceedings, Miazga came to have some concerns about the children's credibility. He consulted with his head office, who advised him to continue the prosecution if he believed the essential elements of the children's story.

On December 18, 1992, the children's biological parents were found guilty of sexual assault against the children. The trial judge went on to urge that the children not be made to endure another criminal trial. As a result of the judge's comments, as well as Miazga's increasing concern about the children's credibility, he negotiated a plea bargain with one of the Klassen's extended family, and stayed the remaining charges.

In 1995, the Saskatchewan Court of Appeal upheld the convictions against the biological parents. In 1996, the Supreme Court of Canada allowed an appeal based on the problems with the children's evidence.

=== Malicious prosecution trial ===
Some years after the stay of proceedings, all three children recanted their allegations. Miazga, along with other members of the investigation, were sued by the Klassens and their extended family members (other than the individual who pleaded guilty) for malicious prosecution.

In 2003, the Court of Queen's Bench for Saskatchewan found Miazga liable for malicious prosecution, criticizing his role in advising the police, his conduct during the criminal proceedings, and his failure to express any remorse and lack of concern about the effect the prosecution had. Specifically, the trial judge noted that Miazga never testified whether he believed the children, and even if did believe the children it would not have been reasonable. In addition, the lack of reasonable and probable grounds created a presumption that Miazga was acting maliciously.

=== Malicious prosecution appeal ===
In 2007, the Saskatchewan Court of Appeal released a split decision regarding Miazga's appeal. All three judges agreed that the trial judge erred in finding that there were strong indications that Miazga was acting maliciously. Miazga had a more limited role than the police during the investigation, and Miazga immediately consented to the Klassens' release on bail at the first opportunity. Whether or not Miazga was over-protective of the children during the trial, it was the trial judge's role to balance the interests of the various parties, not the prosecutor's, and would not only be consistent with malice. Finally, Miazga's failure to apologize did not create an inference of malice, since Miazga was never asked whether he was remorseful.

However, the court was split over whether Miazga was required to have a subjective belief in the guilt of the accused, and whether a lack of reasonable and probable grounds creates an inference of malice. Ultimately, the majority upheld the trial judge's decision.

== Reasons of the court ==
The unanimous decision of the court was written by Charron J.

The court upheld its prior decisions that there are four required elements for the tort of malicious prosecution:

- The prosecution must be initiated by the defendant.
- The prosecution must be terminated in the plaintiff's favour.
- There was a lack of reasonable and probable grounds to commence or continue the prosecution.
- The defendant was motivated to commence or continue to the prosecution due to malice.

=== Initiated by the defendant ===
In the case at bar, the first element was not at issue.

=== Terminated in favour of the plaintiff ===
Although there was some debate in the lower courts about whether the plea bargain affected the second element, it was not a live issue before the Supreme Court.

=== Reasonable and probable grounds ===
The Court recognized that "reasonable and probable grounds" is a lower standard than "reasonable prospect of conviction" (which is the standard used in most Crown offices), but noted that it remained appropriate.

The Court found that "reasonable and probable grounds" is concerned with the Crown's professional, not personal opinion about the merits of the case. While a lack of a subjective belief of the plaintiff's guilt may be enough to meet the third requirement when the defendant is a private prosecutor, it is inconsistent with the role of a public prosecutor in upholding the public interest.

The Court also noted that in reviewing whether there were reasonable and probable grounds, the court should only consider the facts available to the prosecutor at the time the decision was made, not the facts that later came out.

In the case at bar, the Court found that there was no need to consider Miazga's lack of subjective belief that the plaintiffs were guilty. The court also found that even if Miazga had testified that he believed the plaintiffs were guilty, it would not have been outright unreasonable given the facts known to Miazga at the time.

The Court also found that Miazga was allowed to put reliance on the court's original findings of guilt to support that he had reasonable and probable grounds.

=== Malicious intent ===
Malicious intent requires that a Crown was acting pursuant to an improper purpose that was inconsistent with the office of the Crown attorney. An honest but mistaken belief that there were reasonable and probable grounds does not support a finding of malicious intent.

The Court also found that while the lack of a subjective belief of reasonable and probable grounds is a relevant factor in determining malice, it does not automatically equate with malice. It may be the result of inexperience, incompetence, negligence, or gross negligence – none of which are the same as malicious intent.

The Court noted that historically it may have made sense to infer malice when a private prosecutor had no reasonable or probable grounds – otherwise, there would have been no reason to prosecute the case. However, public prosecutors may differ whether they personally believe there are reasonable and probable grounds, but may proceed anyway for reasons consistent with their role as a public prosecutor. Therefore, the Court found that malice could not be inferred when public prosecutors do not have reasonable and probable grounds.

Since the Court of Appeal was unanimous there was no direct evidence of malicious intent of the part of Miazga, and the majority only found evidence of malice from the inference, the Supreme Court found that there was no evidence to support Miazga had any malicious intent.

As a result, the Supreme Court of Canada allowed the appeal and dismissed the action against Miazga.

== See also ==
- List of Supreme Court of Canada cases (McLachlin Court)
- List of Supreme Court of Canada cases
