= R v Mann =

- Supreme Court of Canada

Hearing: March 26, 2004 Judgment: July 23, 2004
- Full case name: Philip Henry Mann v Her Majesty The Queen
- Citations: [2004] 3 S.C.R. 59, 2004 SCC 52 (CanLII); (2004), 241 D.L.R. (4th) 214; [2004] 11 W.W.R. 601; (2004), 185 C.C.C. (3d) 308; (2004), 21 C.R. (6th) 1; (2004), 187 Man. R. (2d) 1; (2004), 187 Man. R. (2e) 1

Court membership
- Chief Justice: Beverley McLachlin; Puisne Justices: Michel Bastarache, Ian Binnie, Louis LeBel, Marie Deschamps, Morris Fish, Rosalie Abella, Louise Charron, Marshall Rothstein

Reasons given
- Dissent: Deschamps (paras. 62-80), joined by Bastarache

R v Mann [2004] 3 S.C.R. 59, 2004 SCC 52 is a 2004 decision of the Supreme Court of Canada.

The court held that although there is no general power of detention for investigative purposes, police officers may detain an individual if there are reasonable grounds to suspect in all the circumstances that the individual is connected to a particular crime and that the detention is reasonably necessary on an objective view of the circumstances. These circumstances include the extent to which the interference with individual liberty is necessary to the performance of the officer's duty, to the liberty interfered with, and to the nature and extent of the interference. At a minimum, individuals who are detained for investigative purposes must be advised, in clear and simple language, of the reasons for the detention. Investigative detentions carried out in accordance with the common law power recognized in this case will not infringe the detainee's rights under s. 9 of the Charter. They should be brief in duration, so compliance with s. 10(b) will not excuse prolonging, unduly and artificially, any such detention. Investigative detentions do not impose an obligation on the detained individual to answer questions posed by the police. Where a police officer has reasonable grounds to believe that his safety or the safety of others is at risk, the officer may engage in a protective pat-down search of the detained individual. The investigative detention and protective search power must be distinguished from an arrest and the incidental power to search on arrest.

== Background ==
On December 23, 2000, in Winnipeg at around midnight, two police officers responded to a break and enter. While searching the neighbourhood, they spotted a young man matching the description of the suspect. He was described as a 21-year-old, 5 foot 8, Aboriginal male in a black jacket. The officers stopped the man, asked him some questions, and then gave him a pat-down. When patting the man down, the officer noticed a soft object in one of his pockets. The officer reached in and pulled out a bag containing 27 grams of marijuana.

The young man was arrested and cautioned for possession for the purposes of trafficking under section 5(2) of the Controlled Drugs and Substances Act.

At trial the judge found that the search violated section 8 of the Charter and that the bag must be excluded from evidence as it would interfere with the fairness of justice under section 24(2) of the Charter. The judge found that the pat-down was reasonable for security purposes only, but reaching into the suspect's pockets was not for that purpose.

On appeal the Court found that the search and detention were within reason given the circumstances, thus the acquittal was set aside and a new trial was ordered.

The following issues were put to the Court:

1. whether there exists, at common law, a police power to detain individuals for investigative purposes
2. if so, whether there exists a concomitant common law power of search incident to such investigative detentions.
3. whether any existing detention and/or search power was properly exercised;
4. if the appellant's rights were violated, whether the evidence ought to be excluded under s. 24(2) of the Canadian Charter of Rights and Freedoms.

== Reasons of the court ==
The Court found that the trial judge was correct and the acquittal should be restored. The opinion of the Court was given by Iacobucci J., joined by Major, Binnie, LeBel, and Fish JJ., with Deschamps and Bastarache JJ. in dissent.

Justice Iaccobucci held that where a police officer detains a suspect on reasonable grounds they are allowed to give a pat-down only as a protective measure. Any search for the purposes of detecting and collecting evidence will not have been on reasonable grounds. In the current case, the initial pat-down was minimally intrusive. However, the search of the pocket must be grounded in a reasonable justification, which in the case has no justification.

== See also ==
- List of Supreme Court of Canada cases (McLachlin Court)
