= Reference Re Same-Sex Marriage =

- Supreme Court of Canada

Hearing: October 6–7, 2004 Judgment: December 9, 2004
- Citations: [2004] 3 S.C.R. 698; 2004 SCC 79 (CanLII)
- Docket No.: 29866

Holding
- Parliament has the authority to legislate in regard to same-sex marriage.

Court membership
- Chief Justice: Beverley McLachlin; Puisne Justices: John C. Major, Michel Bastarache, Ian Binnie, Louis LeBel, Marie Deschamps, Morris Fish, Rosalie Abella, Louise Charron

Reasons given
- Unanimous reasons by: The Court

Reference Re Same-Sex Marriage [2004] 3 S.C.R. 698, 2004 SCC 79, was a reference question to the Supreme Court of Canada regarding the constitutional validity of same-sex marriage in Canada. The ruling was announced December 2004, following arguments made two months prior.

== Background ==
Prior to this case the issue regarding the constitutional validity of same-sex marriage had been considered by several of the provinces' appellate courts, all of them holding that it was constitutionally valid. In response to this, the Government of Canada submitted three questions to the Supreme Court regarding the validity of the proposed same-sex marriage legislation (the Proposal for an Act respecting certain aspects of legal capacity for marriage for civil purposes):

1. Is the proposal for the Act within the authority of Parliament? If not, to what extent?
2. If so, is section 1 of the proposed Act consistent with the Charter? If not, to what extent?
3. Does section 2(a) of the Charter, guaranteeing freedom of religion, protect religious officials who do not believe in same-sex marriage?

Later, an additional question was added:

4. Is the opposite-sex requirement established in the common law and Quebec law consistent with the Charter? If not, to what extent?

== Opinion of the court ==
The court responded to the questions as such:

1. With respect to s. 1: Yes. With respect to s. 2: No.
2. Yes.
3. Yes.
4. The Court exercises its discretion not to answer this question.

The Court began by considering the argument that the questions are not justiciable (i.e. lacks sufficient legal content, or where the nature of the question or the information provided does not permit the Court to give a complete or accurate answer) based on it being a political question. The Court resolutely dismissed this claim for these political considerations provide the context for, rather than the substance of, the questions before the Court, as in the Quebec Secession Reference.

The first question required the court to determine which head of power the law falls under. It was clearly determined that the pith and substance of the law was federal as it concerned marriage which is in the absolute federal jurisdiction under section 91(26) of the Constitution Act, 1867.

The Court then considered the impact of the common law definition of marriage on the new law. The applicable definition was from Hyde v. Hyde (1866) a polygamy case where Lord Penzance stated:

What, then, is the nature of this institution as understood in Christendom?...If it be of common acceptance and existence, it must needs have some pervading identity and universal basis. I conceive that marriage, as understood in Christendom, may for this purpose be defined as the voluntary union for life of one man and one woman, to the exclusion of all others.

The Court rejected this definition by applying the living tree doctrine used in the famous Persons case, analogizing the exclusion of women from the common law definition of "persons" to that of same-sex couples.

The interveners had argued that the meaning of marriage is fixed into convention beyond the reach of the constitution as its old meaning is in practice for thousands of years across the entire globe. Moreover, they argued that the living tree doctrine is constrained within the "natural limits" of interpretation and cannot be stretched to anything the court would like it to be.

The Court rejected these claims, stating that they were not trying to find the definition of marriage, but were only examining whether a proposed meaning was within the definition. The meaning of marriage is not fixed to what it meant in 1867, but rather it must evolve with Canadian society which currently represents a plurality of groups.

However, the Court made sure to say that the legislation was only concerning "civil marriage as a legal institution" and has no effect on religious marriage.

Section 2 of the Act was considered to be ultra vires to Parliament, as its pith and substance related to who may (or must) perform marriages and falls within the subject matter allocated to the provinces under s. 92(12).

On considering the second question, the Court not only affirmed the validity of the legislation, they added that its purpose "flows from" the Charter. They further found that equality right of religious groups and opposite-sex couples are not undermined by the legislation, on the basis that the expansion of the Charter enriches society, and equality cannot be supported by denial of others from a benefit. When conflicts between rights arise, the Court said, it must be resolved by internal balancing of those rights, not denial of rights.

On the third question, the Court found that the religious freedom guarantee will protect those who disagree with performing same-sex marriages and even protect those who disagree with renting religious spaces for the purpose of same-sex marriage. Again, the Court reiterated that it is up to the provinces to legislate protection for religious groups.

The Court decided not to answer the fourth question as it served "no legal purpose". The federal government had already decided not to appeal the Helpren case in Ontario on the very issue and so there was no point examining it again. Also, the court wished to respect the lower-court decisions upholding same-sex marriage by letting them stand.

== Implications ==
In terms of rights for same sex couples, a few have speculated that this case does not add much. However, by pre-litigating the following Civil Marriage Act, it effectively precluded court challenge of the act, thereby hastening its acceptance.

== See also ==
- List of Supreme Court of Canada cases (McLachlin Court)
- Living tree doctrine
