= Robertson v Thomson Corp =

- Supreme Court of Canada

Hearing: December 6, 2005; April 18, 2006 Judgment: October 12, 2006
- Full case name: Heather Robertson v Thomson Corporation
- Citations: 2006 SCC 43
- Prior history: Judgment for Thomson at Ont. C.A. (2004), 72 O.R. (3d) 481
- Ruling: Robertson appeal dismissed. Cross-appeal allowed on CD-Rom issue.

Court membership
- Chief Justice: Beverley McLachlin; Puisne Justices: Michel Bastarache, Ian Binnie, Louis LeBel, Marie Deschamps, Morris Fish, Rosalie Abella, Louise Charron, Marshall Rothstein

Reasons given
- Majority: LeBel and Fish JJ., joined by Bastarache, Deschamps and Rothstein JJ.
- Concur/dissent: Abella J., joined by McLachlin C.J. and Binnie and Charron JJ.

Robertson v Thomson Corp [2006] 2 S.C.R. 363, 2006 SCC 43, is a 2006 Supreme Court of Canada decision on the ownership of copyright in published text that are stored in databases. The ruling held that though a newspaper held the copyright in the collection and the arrangement of freelance articles and in its newspaper, it could not publish the articles within a database. Publication within the database would remove the articles from the context of the collective work and therefore their publication as such was not within the rights held by the newspaper.

== Background ==
In 1995, Heather Robertson, a freelance writer, wrote two articles that were published in the print edition of The Globe and Mail. Later, the newspaper placed copies of her articles in three databases, including Info Globe Online, an online database of Globe and Mail articles, as well as the Canadian Periodical Index. The databases did not contain many aspects of the print version of the Globe and Mail. They did not contain the advertisements, some tables, photographs, artwork, photo captions, birth and death notices, financial tables, weather forecasts and some design elements.

Heather Robertson objected to the presence of her articles in the databases and sued the Globe and Mail for unauthorized reproduction of her work. The case was granted class action status. Robertson also asserted claims on behalf of salaried writers at the Globe.

The issue before the Court was whether the reproduction of Robertson's articles were part of the Globe's copyright in its newspaper or if the reproduction infringes Robertson's copyright in her work.

== Lower court ruling ==
At trial and on appeal, the courts found in favor of Robertson. It was noted that for the Globe to seek protection under its collective copyright the database must constitute a newspaper or consist of a "substantial part thereof in any material form whatever". A substantial part of a newspaper exists in the arranging and formatting of articles, much of which is lost when the articles are put on a database. Thus, the courts found that the database was not merely a newspaper in a different guise but a new work.

== Supreme Court of Canada ruling ==
Four issues were presented to the Supreme Court to decide:

On the appeal:

1. Would a license from a freelance author specifically granting a publisher the right to republish his or her article in the electronic databases need to be in writing?
2. Does Robertson have standing to assert a claim on behalf of employees of the Globe?

On the cross-appeal:

Whether the electronic databases infringed the right of

1. freelance authors; and
2. Globe staff writers.

The bulk of the opinion was focused on the first of the cross-appeal issues.

=== Main Issue ===
The Court first recognized that the author held the copyright in her articles, and the newspaper held the copyright in the compilation or collection of works that contained them. As a result, the issue became whether the electronic databases were a reproduction of the original article, or of the newspaper.

The Court then noted that though the newspaper had the right to modify its collection, it did not have the right to decontextualize its articles so much so as to remove the intimate connection to the newspaper. The Court agreed with the U.S. Supreme Court who found in Tasini that the databases were not a reproduction of the original collected work.

The Court stressed that a primary determinant of their result was the output that the user received when querying the database, not the input that the Globe put into it. Indeed, the Court found that the CD-ROM database did not violate the author's copyright as it presented articles related to that day's paper when a user viewed a particular article. Though the layout was different, the Court reasoned that the essence of the collection remained.

Overall, the Court ruled that Robertson's rights had been violated by the addition of her works into two of the three databases.

=== Secondary Issues ===
After determining that Robertson could claim copyright infringement for the inclusion of her articles in two of the databases, the court then turned to the secondary issues, and ruled that:

1. Only an exclusive license needed to be in writing. A grant of a non-exclusive license does not need to be in writing to be enforceable.
2. Employees of The Globe and Mail should not have been certified as members of the class. The employees retained no rights in the works when the works were produced in accordance with their employment agreements.
3. Given the previous finding that two of the databases did not substantially reproduce the newspapers as they were in the print edition, it was found that the databases were not "newspapers, magazines or similar periodicals for purposes of s. 13(3)" of the Copyright Act.

The Supreme Court of Canada dismissed Robertson's appeal and allowed the cross appeal on the issue of CD-ROMs.

== Dissent ==
Abella, J. dissented in part, on the issue of whether or not the databases were substantially the same as the print version of the Globe and Mail. In her opinion, inclusion of the articles in the databases was a valid exercise of the rights granted to the newspaper publisher by the author.

== See also ==
- New York Times Co. v. Tasini: a similar US case
- List of Supreme Court of Canada cases (McLachlin Court)
