= Newfoundland (Treasury Board) v Newfoundland and Labrador Assn of Public and Private Employees =

- Supreme Court of Canada

Hearing: May 12, 2004 Judgment: October 28, 2004
- Citations: [2004] 3 S.C.R. 381; 2004 SCC 66; (2004), [2005] 242 Nfld. & P.E.I.R. 113; (2004), 244 D.L.R. (4th) 294
- Prior history: Judgment for the Crown in the Newfoundland and Labrador Court of Appeal

Holding
- A Charter violation can be justified under section 1 in the case of a fiscal crisis.

Court membership
- Chief Justice: Beverley McLachlin; Puisne Justices: Frank Iacobucci, John C. Major, Michel Bastarache, Ian Binnie, Louise Arbour, Louis LeBel, Marie Deschamps, Morris Fish

Reasons given
- Unanimous reasons by: Binnie J.

Newfoundland (Treasury Board) v Newfoundland and Labrador Assn of Public and Private Employees [2004] 3 S.C.R. 381, 2004 SCC 66 is a leading Supreme Court of Canada decision where the Court held that a fiscal crisis can be the basis for justifying a violation of rights in the Canadian Charter of Rights and Freedoms through section 1.

== Background ==
The provincial Newfoundland and Labrador government entered a pay equity agreement with the Newfoundland Association of Public and Private Employees (N.A.P.E.) in 1988 which adjusted the wages for hospital employees in areas that were typically staffed by women to be comparable to salaries earned by male-dominated positions. The agreement specified that the wages would be increased over a five-year period ending in 1992.

In 1991, however, the provincial government had a $120 million deficit and was undergoing a significant financial crisis. Consequently, they enacted legislation that would cancel the agreement and would retroactively cancel the arrears already owed to the employees from the previous three years which amounted to about $24 million.

The union began an action against the government on the basis that the legislation discriminated against women and violated section 15(1) of the Charter.

An arbitration board found in favour of the union, ruling that section 15 was violated as the law discriminated against women employees by subjecting them to a larger share of the brunt of the cuts. The further found that it could not be saved under section 1 because the government failed to consider more minimally impairing means to find the money.

The Newfoundland and Labrador Supreme Court overturned the board. A violation of section 15 was found but that it was a reasonable limitation to the rights of the workers under section 1. The judge stated that when balancing the rights between different groups in society, deference should be given to the government.

The Newfoundland and Labrador Court of Appeal upheld the ruling of the Newfoundland Supreme Court.

The issue before the Supreme Court of Canada was whether the lower courts erred in their ruling that the violation was within the reasonable limits of section 1. In a unanimous decision the appeal was dismissed.

== Reasons ==
The ruling of the unanimous court was given by Justice Binnie. He agreed with the lower court's ruling that the legislation had the effect of disproportionately harming women, and that it was a violation section 15(1) of the Charter.

Concerning section 1, Binnie found that the legislation was reasonable limitation on the rights of workers. He rejected the union's argument that financial circumstances can never be the basis of a limitation of rights, rather where there are exceptional circumstances, such as a financial crisis, "elected governments must be accorded significant scope to take remedial measures, even if the measures taken have an adverse effect on a Charter right." However, Binnie made sure to distinguish a previous observation made earlier in Nova Scotia v. Martin (2003), where it was stated that "budgetary considerations in and of themselves cannot normally be invoked as a free-standing pressing and substantial objective for the purposes of s.1 of the Charter".

It was noted that the government was under considerable pressure and had cut costs in many areas. The government cut school funding, froze wages, closed hospital beds, and laid off thousands of employees. Consequently, Binnie observed that all these actions of the government indicated a fiscal crisis that would amount to a "pressing and substantial objective".

the financial health of the province is the golden goose on which all else relies. The government in 1991 was not just debating rights versus dollars, but rights versus hospital beds, rights versus layoffs, rights versus jobs, rights versus education and rights versus social welfare. The requirement to reduce expenditures, and the allocation of the necessary cuts, was undertaken to promote other values of a free and democratic society.

In considering the degree of impairment of equality rights, Binnie found that the impairment was not more than necessary as the cuts for the $24 million would have had to be taken from elsewhere and would likely have caused "even greater grief and social disruption." When asking whether the legislation impairs as little as possible, noted Binnie, the consequences for other social, educational, and economic programs must be taken into account.

Consequently, though the violation was serious and regrettable, Binnie found that it must be justified under section 1 of the Charter.

== See also ==
- List of Supreme Court of Canada cases (McLachlin Court)
