= R v Hape =

- Supreme Court of Canada

Hearing: October 12, 2006 Judgment: June 7, 2007
- Full case name: Lawrence Richard Hape v. Her Majesty The Queen

Court membership
- Chief Justice: Beverley McLachlin; Puisne Justices: Michel Bastarache, Ian Binnie, Louis LeBel, Marie Deschamps, Morris Fish, Rosalie Abella, Louise Charron

Reasons given

R v Hape [2007] 2 S.C.R. 292, 2007 SCC 26 is a case on appeal to the Supreme Court of Canada on cross-border crime. An investment banker was convicted on money laundering. The investigation involved the search of his property in Turks and Caicos by the local police. He claimed his rights under section 8 of the Canadian Charter of Rights and Freedoms were violated by the search. The Supreme Court held that the evidence found in the search was admissible and that the Charter could not be binding on the local police.

== See also ==
- List of Supreme Court of Canada cases (McLachlin Court)
