= Miazga =

- Pronunciation: [ˈmjazga]

Origin
- Language: Polish
- Meaning: pulp, mash
- Region of origin: Poland

Miazga is a Polish surname. It was first recorded in 1399 and is derived from the Polish noun miazga meaning "pulp", "mash". Notable people with the name Miazga include:

- Corinna Miazga (1983–2023), German politician
- Matt Miazga (born 1995), American soccer player
- Renata Knapik-Miazga (born 1988), Polish épée fencer
- Matthew Miazga (born 20th century), Canadian Crown prosecutor; known for the case Miazga v Kvello Estate
