= R v Oickle =

- Supreme Court of Canada

Hearing: November 2, 1999 Judgment: September 29, 2000
- Citations: 2000 SCC 38, [2000] 2 SCR 3
- Docket No.: 26535

Court membership
- Chief Justice: Antonio Lamer; Puisne Justices: Claire L'Heureux-Dubé, Charles Gonthier, Beverley McLachlin, Frank Iacobucci, John C. Major, Michel Bastarache, Ian Binnie, Louise Arbour

Reasons given
- Majority: Iacobucci J (paras 1–105)
- Dissent: Arbour J (paras 106–152)

R v Oickle, 2000 SCC 38 is a leading case decided by the Supreme Court of Canada on the common law rule for confessions. Though the Canadian Charter of Rights and Freedoms ("Charter") remains in force for confessions made while in custody, the common law rule still applies in all circumstances. The majority outlined factors to determine whether a confession is voluntary.

== Background ==
Richard Oickle was under investigation by police for a series of fires. He voluntarily underwent a polygraph test. The police told him he had failed and began to question him. He eventually confessed to starting the fires. Oickle was told he was under arrest and brought to the police station for further questioning. He was put in a cell near 3 am, around nine hours after his confession. The police talked to him again at 6 am asking him to provide a re-enactment, which he did.

At trial, he was convicted of arson. The Court of Appeal found that the confession was inadmissible and overturned the conviction. After review by the Supreme Court of Canada, Iacobucci J, writing for the majority, found the confession was admissible.

== Reasons of the court ==
Iacobucci J, writing for the majority, found that the confession was admissible. He stated the factors that should be used to determine whether a confession is voluntary:

1. The Court must consider whether the police made any threats or promises. Iacobucci states that whether there is a quid pro quo for the confession will usually determine whether it was voluntary.
2. The Court must look for oppression. That is, where there is distasteful or inhumane conduct that would amount to an involuntary confession.
3. The Court must consider whether the suspect has an operating mind. The suspect is sufficiently aware of what he or she is saying and who they are saying it to.
4. The Court can consider the degree of police trickery. While trickery in general is allowed it cannot go so far as to "shock the community".

== See also ==
- List of Supreme Court of Canada cases (McLachlin Court)
- List of Supreme Court of Canada cases
- R v Buhay
- R v Sinclair
