= Re:Sound v Motion Picture Theatre Assns of Canada =

- Supreme Court of Canada

Hearing: December 7, 2011 Judgment: July 12, 2012
- Citations: Full text of Supreme Court of Canada decision available at LexUM and CanLII
- Prior history: Appeal from the Federal Court of Appeal, 2011 FCA 292
- Ruling: Appeal dismissed.

Court membership
- Chief Justice: Beverley McLachlin; Puisne Justices: Louis LeBel, Marie Deschamps, Morris Fish, Rosalie Abella, Marshall Rothstein, Thomas Cromwell, Michael Moldaver, Andromache Karakatsanis

Reasons given
- Unanimous reasons by: LeBel J.

Re:Sound v Motion Picture Theatre Assns of Canada [2012] 2 SCR 376, 2012 SCC 38 is a Supreme Court of Canada case that confirmed that pre-existing sound recordings accompanying a cinematographic work are part of a soundtrack and are therefore excluded from equitable remuneration under the Copyright Act of Canada. The decision was unanimous decided by the court on July 12, 2012.

== Background and facts ==
Re:Sound is a collective society authorized by the Copyright Board of Canada ("Board") to collect equitable remuneration pursuant to s. 19(1) of the Act for the performance in or communication to the public by telecommunication of published sound recordings of musical works.

The case arose due to two proposed tariffs (Tariffs 7 & 9) filed by Re:Sound under s. 67.1(1) of the Copyright Act (the "Act"). Tariff 7 proposed an entitlement for royalties to Re:Sound for the use of sound recordings embodied in a movie by motion picture theatres and other establishments exhibiting movie. Tariff 9 targeted the use of sound recordings in programs broadcast by commercial over the air, pay, specialty and other television services. Re:Sound is entitled to collect tariffs on behalf of performers and makers of sound recordings when their recordings are performed in public or communicated to the public telecommunication under s. 19(1) of the Act.

The respondents argued that the proposed tariffs must fail because the Act's definition of "sound recording" explicitly excludes soundtracks of cinematographic works.

Re:Sound submitted that the definition of "sound recording" does not exclude a pre-existing sound recording that is incorporated into a soundtrack. Rather, it argued, the purpose of the exclusion was to create a hybrid right that combined visual and audio features to create new rights in a "cinematographic work".

== Issue ==
The issue in the appeal was whether pre-existing sound recordings incorporated into a soundtrack fall within the meaning of the undefined term "soundtrack" used in the definition of "sound recording" in s. 2 of the Act?

== Holding ==
The court unanimously agreed with the lower courts and the Motion Picture Theatre Associations of Canada that "soundtrack" includes pre-existing sound recordings and that such recordings are excluded from the definition of "sound recording" when they accompany a cinematographic work.

== Analysis by the court ==
The court stated that there was no legislative intent to exclude pre-existing sound recordings from the definition of "soundtrack" and thus Re:Sound was not entitled to equitable remuneration under s. 19(1) of the Act.

=== Statutory interpretation ===
The relevant sections of the Act read:

"2. In this Act, . . . "sound recording" means a recording, fixed in any material form, consisting of sounds, whether or not of a performance of a work, but excludes any soundtrack of a cinematographic work where it accompanies the cinematographic work;"

"19.(1) Where a sound recording has been published, the performer and maker are entitled, subject to section 20, to be paid equitable remuneration for its performance in public or its communication to the public by telecommunication, except for any retransmission.

(2) For the purpose of providing the remuneration mentioned in subsection (1), a person who performs a published sound recording in public or communicates it to the public by telecommunication is liable to pay royalties

(a)in the case of a sound recording of a musical work, to the collective society authorized under Part VII to collect them; . . ." [emphasis added]

LeBel J, writing for the court, stated that the exclusion in the definition of sound recording for "any soundtrack of a cinematographic work" would be superfluous if a "soundtrack" was considered a "sound recording" when it accompanies a cinematographic work. It follows that such a soundtrack does not trigger the application of s. 19(1) because it is not a "sound recording" as defined in the Act.

For a soundtrack to be eligible for exclusion from equitable remuneration under s. 19(1) it must accompany the cinematographic work. Therefore, if a pre-existing recording is extracted from the cinematographic work (such as in the case of a CD soundtrack for a film) the pre-existing recording regains its ability to trigger s. 19(1) equitable remuneration.

=== Comparative law and international rules ===
The court held foreign statutory definitions of "sound recording" which include the concept of "aggregate of sounds" were sufficiently different, leading to little persuasive weight of cases from foreign jurisdictions.

Re:Sound also argued that the Act is incompatible with the Rome Convention on the basis of Article 10 which provides that "[p]roducers of phonograms shall enjoy the right to authorise or prohibit the direct or indirect reproduction of their phonograms". The court states that the definition of "phonogram" in the Rome Convention includes only "specific aural fixations of sounds" and thus once the sound recording accompanies a cinematographic work it is no longer governed by Article 10. If the sound recording were extracted from the cinematographic work, it would once again be protected, which is consistent with Article 10.

== See also ==
- List of Supreme Court of Canada cases (McLachlin Court)
