= Hape =

Hape is a surname. Notable people with the surname include:

- Hape (tohunga), Polynesian navigator
- Janis Hape (1958–2021), American swimmer
- Patrick Hape (born 1974), American football player
- Shontayne Hape (born 1981), New Zealand rugby league and union player

== See also ==
- R. v. Hape, Supreme Court of Canada case
- HapE is a synonym for Cysteine desulfurase, a hydrogen sulfide, alanine, and pyruvate producing enzyme
- High-altitude pulmonary edema, HAPE
