= Auton (Guardian ad litem of) v British Columbia (AG) =

- Supreme Court of Canada

Hearing: June 9, 2004 Judgment: November 19, 2004
- Full case name: Attorney General of British Columbia and Medical Services Commission of British Columbia v. Connor Auton, an Infant, by his Guardian ad litem, Michelle Auton, and the said Michelle Auton in her personal capacity, Michelle Tamir, an Infant, by her Guardian ad litem, Sabrina Freeman, and the said Sabrina Freeman in her personal capacity, Jordan Lefaivre, an Infant, by his Guardian ad litem, Leighton Lefaivre, and the said Leighton Lefaivre in his personal capacity, Russell Gordon Pearce, an Infant, by his Guardian ad litem, Janet Gordon Pearce, and the said Janet Gordon Pearce in her personal capacity
- Citations: [2004] 3 S.C.R. 657, 2004 SCC 78
- Docket No.: 29508
- Prior history: Judgment against British Columbia in the British Columbia Court of Appeal.
- Ruling: Appeal allowed.

Holding
- Not providing government funding for all medically required treatment is not a discrimination protected by s. 15 of the Canadian Charter of Rights and Freedoms.

Court membership
- Chief Justice: Beverley McLachlin; Puisne Justices: Frank Iacobucci, John C. Major, Michel Bastarache, Ian Binnie, Louise Arbour, Louis LeBel, Marie Deschamps, Morris Fish

Reasons given
- Unanimous reasons by: McLachlin C.J.
- Iacobucci and Arbour JJ. took no part in the consideration or decision of the case.

Auton (Guardian ad litem of) v British Columbia (AG), [2004] 3 S.C.R. 657, 2004 SCC 78 is a leading decision of the Supreme Court of Canada wherein the Court ruled that government funding for non-core medically necessary treatments is not protected under section 15(1) of the Canadian Charter of Rights and Freedoms.

== Background ==
The parents of several children with autism brought an action against the British Columbia government for failing to fund Applied Behavioral Analysis (ABA/IBI), a form of therapy for children with autism.

Both at trial and in the British Columbia Court of Appeal the Court found that the children's equality rights (under section 15) were not violated.

== Ruling ==
The Court unanimously decided that the refusal to fund the ABA/IBI treatment did not violate the children's section 15 equality rights.

McLachlin, writing for the Court, reiterated that the question here is whether the petitioners were denied a benefit in a discriminatory manner (see Law test). However, here, she claimed, the benefit of "funding for all medically required treatment" is not guaranteed by law, as it is neither promised in the Canada Health Act nor any provincial health legislation. Rather, the Health Act only guarantees funding for core services of which ABA/IBI for autism is not one.

The Court further rejected the possibility that people with autism were adversely discriminated against by the underinclusiveness of the legislation. Non-core medical services, McLachlin stated, are by their very nature underinclusive and cannot be considered discriminatory.

For a claim to succeed the petitioner must establish a comparator group from which differential treatment must be shown. In this case, the Court identified the comparator group as a person who is not suffering from a mental disability who wants funding for an emergent or experimental treatment. As the petitioners were unable to show that other seekers of experimental treatments are guaranteed funding, the Court rejected the claim on this basis as well.

== See also ==
- List of Supreme Court of Canada cases (McLachlin Court)
