= Kerr v Danier Leather Inc =

Kerr v. Danier Leather Inc.
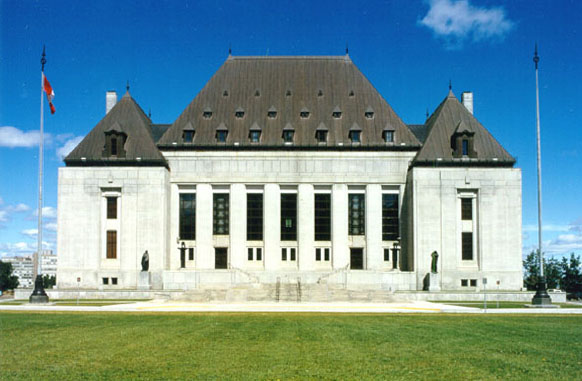
- Court: Supreme Court of Canada
- Decided: October 11, 2007
- Citation: [2007] 3 S.C.R. 331, 2007 SCC 44

Case history
- Prior action: 2005 CanLII 32985 (ON CA)
- Subsequent action: None

Court membership
- Judges sitting: McLachlin C.J., Bastarache, Binnie, LeBel, Deschamps, Fish and Charron JJ.

Keywords
- Securities law, material change, prospectus, disclosure

Kerr v Danier Leather Inc [2007] 3 S.C.R. 331 , 2007 SCC 44 is a 2007 Supreme Court of Canada decision which clarified the legal distinction between "material facts" and "material changes" in the context of securities disclosure. The ruling has become a key authority in Canadian corporate law, particularly on the interpretation of disclosure obligations under the Ontario Securities Act.

== Background ==
Danier Leather Inc., a Canadian retailer, launched an initial public offering (IPO) in 1998. The company’s prospectus included a financial forecast for the final quarter of its fiscal year. Shortly before the closing of the offering, internal sales figures indicated that Danier was underperforming relative to its forecast. Danier did not update the market with these interim results before closing the IPO.

A class action was filed by shareholders under section 130(1) of the Ontario Securities Act, alleging misrepresentation. The trial court found Danier liable, ruling that the company had a duty to disclose the declining sales figures. The Court of Appeal for Ontario reversed the decision, and the matter was appealed to the Supreme Court.

== Supreme Court decision ==
In a 6–1 decision, the Supreme Court dismissed the appeal and upheld the Court of Appeal’s ruling. The Court held that Danier’s forecast was a forward-looking statement that was reasonable when made, and that the emerging intra-quarter data did not constitute a “material change” under securities law. Since no change occurred in the business, operations, or capital of the company (only a shift in financial expectations) the Court found that no disclosure obligation was triggered.

Justice Binnie, writing for the majority, emphasized that securities regulation does not require companies to update previously reasonable forecasts solely due to changing internal results, unless those changes meet the statutory definition of a material change.

== Impact ==
The decision clarified that issuers are not required to correct or update forward-looking statements unless new information amounts to a material change in the company's affairs. The ruling has been cited in subsequent cases and legal commentary as affirming a limited duty to update forecasts, reinforcing the distinction between material facts and material changes under Canadian securities law.

== See also ==
- List of Supreme Court of Canada cases (McLachlin Court)
- Canadian securities regulation
- Material adverse change
