= Nova Scotia (Workers' Compensation Board) v Martin; Nova Scotia (Workers' Compensation Board) v Laseur =

- Supreme Court of Canada

Hearing: December 9, 2002 Judgment: October 3, 2003
- Citations: [2003] 2 S.C.R. 504, 2003 SCC 54

Court membership
- Chief Justice: Beverley McLachlin; Puisne Justices: Charles Gonthier, Frank Iacobucci, John C. Major, Michel Bastarache, Ian Binnie, Louise Arbour, Louis LeBel, Marie Deschamps

Reasons given
- Unanimous reasons by: Gonthier J.

Nova Scotia (Workers' Compensation Board) v Martin; Nova Scotia (Workers' Compensation Board) v Laseur, [2003] 2 S.C.R. 504, 2003 SCC 54, is a leading Supreme Court of Canada decision. The Court re-examined the authority of tribunals to hear constitutional challenges and their power to strike down legislation under section 52(1) of the Constitution Act, 1982. In doing so the Court overturned the previous decision of Cooper v. Canada (Human Rights Commission), (1996). Also, the Court struck down provisions within Nova Scotia's Workers' Compensation Act that prohibited people who were disabled by chronic pain from benefits as a violation of section 15(1) of the Canadian Charter of Rights and Freedoms.

== Background ==
Donald Martin and Ruth Laseur both suffered from chronic pain caused by work injuries. They attempted to claim compensation from the injury but the Worker's Compensation Board denied any benefits.

They challenged the Worker's Compensation Act as a violation of equality rights under section 15(1) of the Charter for denying benefits to those with chronic pain. The Appeals Tribunal held that the Charter was violated in Martin's case.

The government appealed the decision and the Nova Scotia Court of Appeal held that the tribunal did not have the authority to apply the Charter. To arrive at this conclusion the court had followed the Cooper case. In that decision the Supreme Court was divided on when the Charter could be used. McLachlin argued that the Charter belonged "to the people" and so must be granted liberally. Lamer had argued otherwise, stating that only courts of proper authority could use it. The compromise was that it could only be used where there was clear legislative intent. On the facts here there was no clear legislative intent and so the appeal court found no authority.

== Reasons of the court ==
The Court held that the tribunal had the authority to apply the Charter and found that the Act did violate it. Consequently, Martin was given the benefits and Laseur's case was sent back to the tribunal for reconsideration.

Justice Gonthier, writing for a unanimous Court, considered the question of whether the Charter could be applied by the tribunal. Gonthier stated that if the text of the legislation gives the tribunal authority to apply the law then it can also apply the Charter.

In the case where there is no express authority to apply law then the court can look for implied authority by considering the statute as a whole. Factors to be considered include the mandate of the tribunal, whether the body is adjudicative in nature, and whether it possesses any other characteristics of the administrative system.

If the claimant successfully argues that the tribunal has authority to use the Charter, the party opposing this can rebut the presumption by either showing that there is explicit withdrawal of the authority by the legislature, or by showing that the statutory scheme points to an intention to exclude the authority.

== See also ==
- List of Supreme Court of Canada cases (McLachlin Court)
