= R v Buhay =

- Supreme Court of Canada

Hearing: November 1, 2002 Judgment: June 5, 2003
- Full case name: Mervyn Allen Buhay v. Her Majesty The Queen
- Citations: [2003] 1 S.C.R. 631, 2003 SCC 30, 225 D.L.R. (4th) 624, [2004] 4 W.W.R. 1, 174 C.C.C. (3d) 97, 107 C.R.R. (2d) 240, 10 C.R. (6th) 205, 177 Man. R. (2d) 72, 177 Man. R. (2e) 72
- Docket No.: 28667
- Prior history: Judgment for the Crown in the Manitoba Court of Appeal.
- Ruling: Appeal allowed.

Holding
- A person has a reasonable expectation of privacy in a locked locker in a public area, where the person has possession of the locker's key.

Court membership
- Chief Justice: Beverley McLachlin; Puisne Justices: Charles Gonthier, Frank Iacobucci, John C. Major, Michel Bastarache, Ian Binnie, Louise Arbour, Louis LeBel, Marie Deschamps

Reasons given
- Unanimous reasons by: Arbour J.

R v Buhay [2003] 1 S.C.R. 631, 2003 SCC 30 is a leading Supreme Court of Canada decision on the Charter rights protecting against unreasonable search and seizure (section 8) and the criteria for the exclusion of evidence under section 24(2). The court held that for evidence to be excluded on the Collins test, the seriousness of the breach must be determined by looking at factors such as good faith and necessity. On the facts, marijuana found in a bus station locker was excluded from evidence because the police had insufficient reason to search it without a warrant.

== Background ==
Mr. Buhay had rented a locker in a Winnipeg bus station in which he stored a duffel bag of marijuana. The smell from the bag attracted the attention of the security guards who had a station attendant open it for them. They confirmed their suspicion of the contents of the bag, then locked it back into the locker, and called the police. When two constables arrived they had the attendant open the locker again. They took the bag.

At no time did anyone get a warrant to search the locker. One of the police officers testified that it had not crossed their mind to obtain one. The other police officer testified that they believed the users of the lockers had given up any right to privacy over the contents because the lockers belonged to the bus station; moreover, they were doubtful there would be enough grounds for a warrant.

At trial, the judge found that the police violated section 8 of the Charter and excluded the evidence under section 24(2). The Court of Appeal overturned the acquittal on the basis that the locker was under the control of the stations security and there was no unlawful search.

The questions before the Supreme Court were: whether Buhay had a reasonable expectation of privacy with respect to the locker, whether section 8 of the Charter applied to the security guards, whether the search and seizure by the police was contrary to section 8 and, if there was an unreasonable search and seizure, if the relevant evidence should be excluded under section 24(2).

== Opinion of the Court ==
The Supreme Court restored the trial judge's acquittal, finding that there was a violation of section 8 and the grounds were sufficient to exclude the evidence. The decision was written by Arbour J.

On the first issue, the court found that Buhay had a reasonable expectation of privacy over the locker's contents because he had control and possession of them by virtue of paying the fee for his exclusive use of the locker, and possessing the key to the locker. That the bus station owned the locker and possessed a master key to open any and all of the lockers did not destroy the users' expectation of privacy.

On the second issue, the court found that section 8 of the Charter did not apply to the security guards. Regardless of involving the police after the fact, the security guards acted independently of the police when they began their initial search of the locker and thus were not "agents of the state".

However, with respect to the third issue, the search and seizure by the police was held to be contrary to section 8. Even though Buhay's privacy was initially invaded by the security guards there was still a continuous expectation of privacy over the locker's contents, and the security guards' violation of privacy did not make any subsequent violations permissible. The warrantless search of the locker by police was prima facie unreasonable, and there were no exigent circumstances to justify the warrantless search.

On the final issue, the court found that evidence ought to be excluded under section 24(2). The situation did not demand immediate action to secure the evidence by conducting a warrantless search and seizure. The fact that one of the constables believed that there were insufficient grounds to obtain a search warrant did not justify a warrantless search and indicated that the police actively chose to avoid the requirement entirely despite misgivings that a warrant might be required. The court found that police could have obtained the evidence by other means—by obtaining a search warrant, or by conducting surveillance—and that they did not attempt to do so constituted an "absence of sincere effort to comply with the Charter".

== See also ==
- List of Supreme Court of Canada cases (McLachlin Court)
