= Society of Composers, Authors and Music Publishers of Canada v. Canadian Ass'n of Internet Providers =

- Supreme Court of Canada

Hearing: December 3, 2003 Judgment: June 30, 2004
- Full case name: Society of Composers, Authors and Music Publishers of Canada v. Canadian Association of Internet Providers
- Citations: [2004] 2 S.C.R. 427, 2004 SCC 45, 240 D.L.R. (4th) 193, 32 C.P.R. (4th) 1
- Prior history: Judgment for SOCAN in the Federal Court of Appeal.

Court membership
- Chief Justice: Beverley McLachlin; Puisne Justices: Frank Iacobucci, John C. Major, Michel Bastarache, Ian Binnie, Louise Arbour, Louis LeBel, Marie Deschamps, Morris Fish

Reasons given
- Majority: Binnie J., joined by McLachlin, Iacobucci, Major, Bastarache, Arbour, Deschamps and Fish J.
- Dissent: LeBel J.

Society of Composers, Authors and Music Publishers of Canada v. Canadian Ass'n of Internet Providers 2 S.C.R. 427, 2004 SCC 45 - also known as the Tariff 22 case - is a leading decision by the Supreme Court of Canada on Internet service provider (ISP) liability for copyright infringement. The Court found that there is no liability for information found in web caches. An ISP's liability depends on whether it limits itself to "a conduit" or a content-neutral function and is not dependent on where the ISP is located.

== Background ==
In 1995 the Society of Composers, Authors, and Music Publishers of Canada (SOCAN) applied for a royalty tariff to the Copyright Board of Canada that would allow them to collect royalties for copyrighted materials transferred over the internet. In rebuttal, the Canadian Association of Internet Providers (CAIP) claimed that they served only as intermediaries and could not be held liable.

In 2002, the Federal Court of Appeal held that an ISP could rely on the "intermediary exception" found in section 2.4(1)(b) that absolved carriers who only pass information through their system from liability. However, this exception did not apply for caching of information as doing so was considered more than just relaying information. Thus an ISP who refuses to remove copyrighted material from its servers after given reasonable opportunity to do so could be held liable. Lastly, the Court of Appeal found that the tariff should not be limited to material originating from Canada alone.

== Reasons of the court ==
The Court's opinion was written by Binnie J. with McLachlin C.J., Iacobucci, Major, Bastarache, Arbour, Deschamps and Fish JJ. concurring. A minority opinion was given by LeBel J.

=== Binnie ===
To begin, Binnie notes the huge capacity of the internet to disseminate knowledge and it should be encouraged; however, a balance is difficult to find.

Binnie first examined the applicability of the Copyright Act. It depends on whether there is a "real and substantial connection" between Canada and the transmission source, Binnie claims. This would mean that the Act applies to communications received in or originating from Canada.

Turning to the liability of the ISPs, Binnie examined the policy reason behind section 2.4(1)(b) of the Copyright Act ("intermediary exception"). He notes that its purpose is to encourage intermediaries to improve their operations without fear of infringement. Thus ISPs can benefit from the intermediary exception if they limit their role to one of "conduit" and do not perform any acts related to content. Moreover, an ISP must only provide "means" to communicate that are "necessary". Binnie adopted the Board's broad meaning of the word "means" as including routers and the accompanying software, hosting, and connectivity services.

Binnie examines the meaning of "necessary" as it applies to a provider's cache. He finds that a cache copy of a communication is content-neutral and is dictated by the technical requirements of the technology. Thus so long as it is for the purposes of "economy and efficiency" it does not make the role of the provider less of an intermediary. Therefore, an ISP can seek protection under section 2.4(1)(b) ("intermediary exception").

In concluding, Binnie notes that it is impossible to impute actual knowledge on an ISP of a copyright violation, and thus cannot impose liability. If an ISP received notice that

someone might be using neutral technology to violate copyright (as with the photocopier in the CCH case) is not necessarily sufficient to constitute authorization, which requires a demonstration that the defendant did "(g)ive approval to; sanction, permit; favour, encourage" (CCH, at para. 38) the infringing conduct.

However, in obiter Binnie further suggested

I agree that notice of infringing content, and a failure to respond by "taking it down" may in some circumstances lead to a finding of "authorization" ... An overly quick inference of "authorization" would put the Internet Service Provider in the difficult position of judging whether the copyright objection is well founded, and to choose between contesting a copyright action or potentially breaching its contract with the content provider. A more effective remedy to address this potential issue would be the enactment by Parliament of a statutory "notice and take down" procedure as has been done in the European Community and the United States.

== LeBel ==
LeBel J. agreed with Binnie's conclusion but took issue with the test for determining the location of an internet communication under the Copyright Act (the "real and substantial connection" test). Rather, he agrees with the Copyright Board's decision to only apply to providers located in Canada. He finds the board's test to be more in-line with international treaties and diminishes privacy concerns.

== See also ==
- List of Supreme Court of Canada cases (McLachlin Court)
- Théberge v Galerie d'Art du Petit Champlain Inc
- CCH Canadian Ltd v Law Society of Upper Canada
