= List of Supreme Court of Canada cases (McLachlin Court) =

This is a chronological list of notable cases decided by the Supreme Court of Canada from the appointment of Beverley McLachlin as Chief Justice of Canada to her retirement in 2017.

== 2000–2004 ==
Case name	Citation	Date	Subject
January 7, 2000 - Appointment of Beverley McLachlin as Chief Justice of Canada
Arsenault-Cameron v Prince Edward Island	[2000] 1 S.C.R. 3, 2000 SCC 1	January 13, 2000	language rights
Reference re Firearms Act	[2000] 1 S.C.R. 783, 2000 SCC 31	June 15, 2000	Criminal law power
Lovelace v Ontario	[2000] 1 S.C.R. 950, 2000 SCC 37	July 20, 2000	Aboriginal gaming
R v Oickle	[2000] 2 S.C.R. 3, 2000 SCC 38	September 29, 2000	Common law rule of confessions
R v Darrach	[2000] 2 S.C.R. 443, 2000 SCC 46	October 12, 2000	Rape shield law
R v Morrisey	[2000] 2 S.C.R. 90, 2000 SCC 39	September 29, 2000	Cruel and unusual punishment
R v Starr	[2000] 2 S.C.R. 144, 2000 SCC 40	September 29, 2000	Hearsay exception
Blencoe v British Columbia (Human Rights Commission)	[2000] 2 S.C.R. 307, 2000 SCC 44	October 5, 2000	Human Rights Commission
Free World Trust v Électro Santé Inc	[2000] 2 S.C.R. 1024, 2000 SCC 66	December 15, 2000	Patent claim construction
Little Sisters Book and Art Emporium v Canada (Minister of Justice)	[2000] 2 S.C.R. 1120, 2000 SCC 69	December 15, 2000	Obscenity
R v Latimer	[2001] 1 S.C.R. 3, 2001 SCC 1	January 18, 2001	Euthanasia
R v Sharpe	[2001] 1 S.C.R. 45, 2001 SCC 2	January 26, 2001	Freedom of expression
United States v Burns	[2001] 1 S.C.R. 283, 2001 SCC 7	February 15, 2001	Extradition, death penalty, section 7, section 12
R v Ruzic	[2001] 1 S.C.R. 687, 2001 SCC 24	April 20, 2001	Defence of duress
Trinity Western University v British Columbia College of Teachers	[2001] 1 S.C.R. 772, 2001 SCC 31	May 17, 2001	Religion in schools; judicial review
Mitchell v MNR	[2001] 1 S.C.R. 911, 2001 SCC 33	May 24, 2001	Aboriginal rights
Therrien (Re)	[2001] 2 S.C.R. 3, 2001 SCC 35	June 7, 2001	Judicial independence
R v Pan; R v Sawyer	[2001] 2 S.C.R. 344, 2001 SCC 42	June 29, 2001	Section 7, juries, disclosure
Law Society of British Columbia v Mangat	[2001] 3 S.C.R. 113, 2001 SCC 67	October 18, 2001	Paramountcy doctrine; practice of law
R v Advance Cutting & Coring Ltd	[2001] 3 SCR 209, 2001 SCC 70	October 19, 2001	Labour relations, freedom of association
R v Nette	[2001] 3 S.C.R. 488, 2001 SCC 78	November 15, 2001	Criminal causation
Cooper v Hobart	[2001] 3 S.C.R. 537, 2001 SCC 79	November 16, 2001	Duty of care in torts
Dunmore v Ontario (AG)	[2001] 3 S.C.R. 1016, 2001 SCC 94	December 20, 2001	Freedom of association
Suresh v Canada (Minister of Citizenship and Immigration)	[2002] 1 S.C.R. 3, 2002 SCC 1	January 11, 2002	Constitutional challenge of deportation
Ahani v Canada (Minister of Citizenship and Immigration)	[2002] 1 S.C.R. 72, 2002 SCC 2	January 11, 2002	Constitutional challenge of deportation
Retail, Wholesale and Department Store Union, Local 558 v Pepsi-Cola Canada Beverages (West) Ltd	[2002] 1 S.C.R. 156, 2002 SCC 8	January 24, 2002	Freedom of expression; secondary picketing
Ward v Canada (AG)	[2002] 1 S.C.R. 569, 2002 SCC 17	February 22, 2002	Division of powers
Théberge v Galerie d'Art du Petit Champlain Inc	[2002] 2 S.C.R. 336, 2002 SCC 34	March 28, 2002	Copyright
R v Handy	[2002] 2 S.C.R. 908, 2002 SCC 56	June 21, 2002	Similar fact evidence rule
R v Hall	[2002] 3 S.C.R. 309, 2002 SCC 64	October 10, 2002	Bail, section 11(e)
Sauvé v Canada (Chief Electoral Officer)	[2002] 3 S.C.R. 519, 2002 SCC 68	October 31, 2002	Right to vote for prisoners
Harvard College v Canada (Commissioner of Patents)	[2002] 4 S.C.R. 45, 2002 SCC 76	December 5, 2002	Harvard mouse, patenting higher lifeforms
Apotex Inc v Wellcome Foundation Ltd	[2002] 4 S.C.R. 153, 2002 SCC 77	December 5, 2002	Patents
Nova Scotia (AG) v Walsh	[2002] 4 S.C.R. 325, 2002 SCC 83	December 19, 2002	Marital status and equality rights
Gosselin v Quebec (AG)	[2002] 4 S.C.R. 429, 2002 SCC 84	December 19, 2002	Constitutional entitlement to social assistance
Chamberlain v Surrey School District No 36	[2002] 4 S.C.R. 710, 2002 SCC 86	December 20, 2002	Religion in schools; school board book selections
Siemens v Manitoba (AG)	[2003] 1 S.C.R. 6, 2003 SCC 3	January 30, 2003	Criminal law power; constitutionality of ban on video lottery terminals
Dr Q v College of Physicians and Surgeons of British Columbia	[2003] 1 S.C.R. 226, 2003 SCC 19	April 3, 2003	Judicial review
Miglin v Miglin	[2003] 1 S.C.R. 303, 2003 SCC 24	April 17, 2003	Separation agreements
R v Buhay	[2003] 1 S.C.R. 631, 2003 SCC 30	June 5, 2003	Exclusion of evidence, search and seizure
Starson v Swayze	[2003] 1 S.C.R. 722, 2003 SCC 32	June 6, 2003	Capacity to consent to medical treatment
Trociuk v British Columbia (AG)	[2003] 1 S.C.R. 835, 2003 SCC 34	June 6, 2003	Section 15 equality rights
Figueroa v Canada (AG)	[2003] 1 S.C.R. 912, 2003 SCC 37	June 27, 2003	Right to run for office
R v Asante-Mensah	[2003] 2 S.C.R. 3, 2003 SCC 38	July 11, 2003	Citizens' powers of arrest
Nova Scotia (Workers' Compensation Board) v Martin; Nova Scotia (Workers' Compensation Board) v Laseur	[2003] 2 S.C.R. 504, 2003 SCC 54	October 3, 2003	Constitution and tribunals
Doucet-Boudreau v Nova Scotia (Minister of Education)	[2003] 3 S.C.R. 3, 2003 SCC 62	November 6, 2003	The scope of section 24(1) of the Canadian Charter of Rights and Freedoms
Beals v Saldanha	[2003] 3 S.C.R. 416, 2003 SCC 72	December 18, 2003	Conflict of laws
R v Malmo-Levine; R v Caine	[2003] 3 S.C.R. 571, 2003 SCC 74	December 23, 2003	Possession of marijuana charter challenge
R v Clay	[2003] 3 S.C.R. 735, 2003 SCC 75	December 23, 2003	Possession of marijuana charter challenge (second)
Canadian Foundation for Children, Youth and the Law v Canada (AG)	[2004] 1 S.C.R. 76, 2004 SCC 4	January 30, 2004	Spanking allowed under charter
CCH Canadian Ltd v Law Society of Upper Canada	[2004] 1 S.C.R. 39, 2004 SCC 13	March 4, 2004	Copyright infringement, fair dealing
Monsanto Canada Inc v Schmeiser	[2004] 1 S.C.R. 902, 2004 SCC 34	May 21, 2004	Patents
Harper v Canada (AG)	[2004] 1 S.C.R. 827, 2004 SCC 33	May 18, 2004	Freedom of speech, federal elections
Society of Composers, Authors and Music Publishers of Canada v Canadian Assn of Internet Providers	[2004] 2 S.C.R. 427, 2004 SCC 45	June 30, 2004	Internet service providers as common carriers. Status of caches.
Syndicat Northcrest v Amselem	[2004] 2 S.C.R. 551, 2004 SCC 47	June 30, 2004	Freedom of religion
R v Mann	[2004] 3 S.C.R. 59, 2004 SCC 52	July 23, 2004	Section 8 search and seizure
Hodge v Canada (Minister of Human Resources Development)	[2004] 3 S.C.R. 357, 2004 SCC 65	October 28, 2004	Equality rights and comparator groups
Newfoundland (Treasury Board) v Newfoundland and Labrador Assn of Public and Private Employees	[2004] 3 S.C.R. 381, 2004 SCC 66	October 28, 2004	Equality, gender discrimination
R v Tessling	[2004] 3 S.C.R. 432, 2004 SCC 67	October 29, 2004	Privacy rights, section 8, thermal imaging
Peoples Department Stores Inc (Trustee of) v Wise	[2004] 3 S.C.R. 461, 2004 SCC 68	October 29, 2004	Director liability
Auton (Guardian ad litem of) v British Columbia (AG)	[2004] 3 S.C.R. 657, 2004 SCC 78	November 19, 2004	Non-core services medical services not guaranteed under charter
Reference Re Same-Sex Marriage	[2004] 3 S.C.R. 698, 2004 SCC 79	December 9, 2004	Extension of civil marriage to same-sex couples

== 2005–2009 ==
Case name	Citation	Date	Subject
R v Krymowski	[2005] 1 S.C.R. 101, 2005 SCC 7	February 24, 2005	Hate speech
Gosselin (Tutor of) v Quebec (AG)	[2005] 1 S.C.R. 238 , 2005 SCC 15	March 31, 2005	Language rights
Casimir v Quebec (AG)	[2005] 1 S.C.R. 257, 2005 SCC 16	March 31, 2005	Language rights
Canada (House of Commons) v Vaid	[2005] 1 S.C.R. 667 , 2005 SCC 30	May 20, 2005	Parliamentary privilege
Chaoulli v Quebec (AG)	[2005] 1 S.C.R. 791, 2005 SCC 35	June 9, 2005	Private health insurance; section 7
Mugesera v Canada (Minister of Citizenship and Immigration)	[2005] 2 S.C.R. 100, 2005 SCC 40	June 28, 2005	Crimes against humanity; removal; judicial review
R v Marshall; R v Bernard	[2005] 2 S.C.R. 220 , 2005 SCC 43	July 20, 2005	Aboriginal logging rights
Provincial Court Judges' Assn of New Brunswick v New Brunswick (Minister of Justice)	[2005] 2 S.C.R. 286, 2005 SCC 44	July 22, 2005	Judicial independence
British Columbia v Imperial Tobacco Canada Ltd	[2005] 2 S.C.R. 473 , 2005 SCC 49	September 29, 2005	Gov't actions against tobacco companies
R v Turcotte	[2005] 2 S.C.R. 519 , 2005 SCC 50	September 30, 2005	Right to silence
EB v Order of the Oblates of Mary Immaculate in the Province of British Columbia	[2005] 3 S.C.R. 45 , 2005 SCC 60	October 28, 2005	Vicarious liability
Montréal (City of) v 2952-1366 Québec Inc	[2005] 3 S.C.R. 141 , 2005 SCC 62	November 3, 2005	Freedom of expression
Kirkbi AG v Ritvik Holdings Inc	[2005] 3 S.C.R. 302 , 2005 SCC 65	November 17, 2005	Trade-marks
Charlebois v Saint John (City of)	[2005] 3 S.C.R. 563 , 2005 SCC 74	December 15, 2005	Minority language rights in New Brunswick
R v Labaye	[2005] 3 S.C.R. 728, 2005 SCC 80	December 21, 2005	Defining "indecent" in criminal code
R v Kouri	[2005] 3 S.C.R. 789 , 2005 SCC 81	December 21, 2005	Sister case to R. v. Labaye
Multani v Commission scolaire Marguerite‑Bourgeoys	[2006] 1 S.C.R. 256 , 2006 SCC 6	March 2, 2006	Freedom of religion; banning kirpans in school
R v Rodgers	[2006] 1 S.C.R. 554 , 2006 SCC 15	April 27, 2006	DNA collection
Childs v Desormeaux	[2006] 1 S.C.R. 643 , 2006 SCC 18	May 5, 2006	Social host liability
Mattel Inc v 3894207 Canada Inc	[2006] 1 S.C.R. 722, 2006 SCC 22	June 2, 2006	Registered trademark infringement
Robertson v Thomson Corp	[2006] 2 S.C.R. 363, 2006 SCC 43	October 12, 2006	Copyright in database content
Pro Swing Inc v Elta Golf Inc	[2006] 2 S.C.R. 612, 2006 SCC 52	November 17, 2006	Conflict of laws, enforcement of foreign judgment
R v Khelawon	[2006] 2 S.C.R. 787, 2006 SCC 57	December 14, 2006	Hearsay evidence
Charkaoui v Canada (Minister of Citizenship and Immigration)	[2007] 1 S.C.R. 350, 2007 SCC 9	February 23, 2007	Security certificates of terror suspect
Canada (AG) v Hislop	[2007] 1 S.C.R. 429 , 2007 SCC 10	March 1, 2007	Charter; section 15 equality rights
R v Bryan	[2007] 1 S.C.R. 527 , 2007 SCC 12	March 15, 2007	Publishing early election results
Canadian Western Bank v Alberta	[2007] 2 S.C.R. 3, 2007 SCC 22	May 31, 2007	Federalism and separation of powers
R v Hape	[2007] 2 S.C.R. 292, 2007 SCC 26	June 7, 2007	Extraterritoriality; cross-border crime; section 8 of the charter
Health Services and Support – Facilities Subsector Bargaining Assn. v British Columbia	[2007] 2 SCR 391, 2007 SCC 27	June 8, 2007	Freedom of association; collective bargaining
Kerr v Danier Leather Inc	[2007] 3 S.C.R. 331 , 2007 SCC 44	October 12, 2007	Business judgment rule
Dunsmuir v New Brunswick	[2008] 1 SCR 190, 2008 SCC 9	March 7, 2008	Standard of review
R v Kang-Brown	[2008] 1 S.C.R. 456 , 2008 SCC 18	April 25, 2008	Section 8, constitutionality of sniffer dog, informational privacy
R v AM	[2008] 1 S.C.R. 569 , 2008 SCC 19	April 25, 2008	Section 8, constitutionality of sniffer dog, informational privacy
R v DB	[2008] 2 S.C.R. 3 , 2008 SCC 25	May 16, 2008	Section 7 of the charter; presumptive youth offences
Honda Canada Inc v Keays	[2008] 2 S.C.R. 362 , 2008 SCC 39	June 27, 2008	Superseding Wallace v United Grain Growers Ltd in determining how damages for wrongful dismissal are assessed where there is bad faith in how the employer handles termination of employment
Apotex Inc v Sanofi-Synthelabo Canada Inc	[2008] 3 S.C.R. 265, 2008 SCC 61	November 6, 2008	Canadian patent law
Canada (Minister of Citizenship and Immigration) v Khosa	[2009] 1 S.C.R. 339, 2009 SCC 12	March 6, 2009	Standard of review in administrative law
BMP Global Distribution Inc v Bank of Nova Scotia	[2009] 1 S.C.R. 504, 2009 SCC 15	April 2, 2009	Restitution and tracing
R v Patrick	[2009] 1 S.C.R. 579 , 2009 SCC 17	April 9, 2009	Section 8 of the charter; search and seizure, reasonable expectation of privacy, informational privacy
R v Grant	[2009] _ S.C.R. _, 2009 SCC 32	June 17, 2009	Definition of detention; analytical framework for section 24(2) of the charter
R v Harrison	[2009] _ S.C.R. _, 2009 SCC 34	June 17, 2009	Application of section 24(2) of the charter to egregious police conduct
Alberta v Hutterian Brethren of Wilson Colony	[2009] 2 S.C.R. 567, 2009 SCC 37	July 24, 2009	Constitutionality of conflict between mandatory license photographs and freedom of religion
Miazga v Kvello Estate	[2009] _ S.C.R. _, 2009 SCC 51	November 6, 2009	Tort of malicious prosecution
R v Basi	[2009] 3 S.C.R. 389, 2009 SCC 52	November 19, 2009	Informer privilege
Grant v Torstar Corp	[2009] _ S.C.R. _, 2009 SCC 61	December 22, 2009	Tort of defamation, defence of responsible communication

== 2010–2017 ==
Case name	Citation	Date	Subject
Tercon Construction Ltd v British Columbia (Transportation and Highways)	[2010] 1 S.C.R. 69, 2010 SCC 4	February 10, 2010	Striking down the doctrine of fundamental breach
Bank of Montreal v Innovation Credit Union	[2010] 3 S.C.R. 3, 2010 SCC 47	November 5, 2010	Application of the Bank Act
Masterpiece Inc. v. Alavida Lifestyles Inc.	[2011] 2 S.C.R. 387, 2011 SCC 27	May 26, 2011	Confusion in Canadian trademark law
R v JA	[2011] 2 S.C.R. 440, 2011 SCC 28	May 27, 2011	Advance consent to perform sexual acts while unconscious
Canada Trustco Mortgage Co v Canada	[2011] 2 S.C.R. 635, 2011 SCC 36	July 15, 2011	Whether bank liable to make payments to tax debtor when receiving cheques payable to tax debtor for deposit in account held jointly by tax debtor and third party
Canada (AG) v PHS Community Services Society	[2011] 3 S.C.R. 144, 2011 SCC 44	September 30, 2011	Safe injection site, constitutional law, section 7 of the Charter
Copthorne Holdings Ltd v Canada	[2011] 3 S.C.R. 721, 2011 SCC 63	December 16, 2011	Income Tax Act, general anti-avoidance rule (GAAR), statutory interpretation
Reference Re Securities Act	[2011] 3 S.C.R. 837, 2011 SCC 66	December 22, 2011	Constitutionality of the Parliament of Canada being able to regulate the issue and trade of securities of publicly owned companies
Doré v Barreau du Québec	[2012] 1 S.C.R. 395, 2012 SCC 12	March 22, 2012	Application of the Canadian Charter of Rights and Freedoms to administrative tribunals
R v Tse	[2012] 1 S.C.R. 531, 2012 SCC 16	April 13, 2012	Constitutionality of emergency wiretaps
Entertainment Software Assn v Society of Composers, Authors and Music Publishers of Canada	[2012] 2 SCR 231, 2012 SCC 32	July 12, 2012	Copyright Act, meaning of the word communicate in "communicate the work to the public by telecommunication"
Rogers v SOCAN	[2012] 2 SCR 283, 2012 SCC 35	July 12, 2012	Copyright Act, meaning of the terms "to the public" in "communicate the work to the public by telecommunication"
Re:Sound v. MPTAC	[2012] 2 SCR 376, 2012 SCC 38	July 12, 2012	Copyright Act
Society of Composers, Authors and Music Publishers of Canada v Bell Canada	[2012] 2 SCR 326, 2012 SCC 36	July 12, 2012	Copyright Act, fair dealing for the purpose of research
Alberta (Minister of Education) v Canadian Copyright Licensing Agency (Access Copyright)	[2012] 2 SCR 345, 2012 SCC 37	July 12, 2012	Copyright Act, fair dealing for the purpose of private study
Manitoba Métis Federation Inc v Canada (AG)	[2013] 1 S.C.R. 623, 2013 SCC 14	March 8, 2013	Aboriginal law, civil procedure
Canada (AG) v Bedford	[2013] 3 S.C.R. 1101, 2013 SCC 72	Dec 20, 2013	Constitutionality of prostitution laws
Reference Re Supreme Court Act, ss 5 and 6	[2014] 1 S.C.R. 433, 2014 SCC 21	March 21, 2014	Supreme Court Quebec slots, Supreme Court Act amendment process, Supreme Court appointments
Peracomo Inc v TELUS Communications Co	[2014] 1 S.C.R. 621, 2014 SCC 29	April 23, 2014	Maritime law, marine insurance
Reference re Senate Reform	[2014] 1 S.C.R. 704, 2014 SCC 32	April 25, 2014	Senate of Canada
R v Spencer	[2014] S.C.R. , 2014 SCC 43	June 13, 2014	Voluntary disclosure of ISP subscriber information
R v Fearon	[2014] S.C.R. , 2014 SCC 77	December 11, 2014	Search of electronic devices incidental to arrest
Mounted Police Association of Ontario v Canada (Attorney General)	[2015] 1 S.C.R. 3, 2015 SCC 1	January 16, 2015	Freedom of association, right to join a union
Saskatchewan Federation of Labour v Saskatchewan	[2015] S.C.R., 2015 SCC 4	January 30, 2015	The right to strike under s. 2(d) of the Charter
Carter v Canada (AG)	[2015] S.C.R. , 2015 SCC 5	February 6, 2015	Right to physician assisted dying
R v Nur	[2015] S.C.R. , 2015 SCC 15	April 14, 2015	Constitutionality of mandatory minimum sentences for various firearm offences
Mouvement laïque québécois v Saguenay (City)	[2015] S.C.R. , 2015 SCC 16	April 15, 2015	State duty of neutrality and prayers before city council meetings
Guindon v Canada	[2015] S.C.R. , 2015 SCC 41	July 31, 2015	Distinction between criminal and regulatory penalties
Daniels v Canada (Indian Affairs and Northern Development)	[2016] S.C.R. , 2016 SCC 12	April 14, 2016	Who qualify as "Indians" under the Constitution Act
R v Jordan	[2016] S.C.R. , 2016 SCC 27	July 8, 2016	Section 11 of the Charter; establishing strict time ceiling for trial delays
Douez v Facebook	[2017] S.C.R. , 2017 SCC 33	June 23, 2017	Enforceability of forum selection clauses in consumer facing contracts
December 15, 2017 – retirement of Chief Justice Beverley McLachlin.

== See also ==
- List of notable Canadian Courts of Appeals cases
