= R v Tessling =

- Supreme Court of Canada

Hearing: April 16, 2004 Judgment: October 29, 2004
- Full case name: Her Majesty The Queen v. Walter Tessling
- Citations: [2004] 3 S.C.R. 432, 2004 SCC 67

Holding
- police use of FLIR imaging technology does not constitute a violation of right against unreasonable search under section 8 of the Charter

Court membership
- Chief Justice: Beverley McLachlin C.J.
- Puisne Justices: Frank Iacobucci(*), John C. Major, Michel Bastarache, Ian Binnie, Louise Arbour(*), Louis LeBel, Marie Deschamps, Morris Fish (*) did not take part in decision

Reasons given
- Unanimous decision by: Binnie

R v Tessling [2004] 3 S.C.R. 432, 2004 SCC 67 is a leading Supreme Court of Canada decision where the Court held that the use of thermal imaging by police in the course of an investigation of a suspect's property did not constitute a violation of the accused's right to a reasonable expectation of privacy under section 8 of the Canadian Charter of Rights and Freedoms.

== Background ==
In February 1999, the Ontario Provincial Police received a tip that Walter Tessling was running a marijuana grow operation. In the course of the investigation, the police checked with Ontario Hydro for significant amounts of electricity usage, often indicative of a grow operation, on Tessling's property. Failing to find any unusual power usage, the police then attempted a visual surveillance of the residence, which also failed to show anything unusual. The police then opted to use an infra-red heat-sensor to detect any amounts of heat upon his property that would suggest a grow operation. Without any warrant, the Royal Canadian Mounted Police (RCMP) flew over Tessling's property with a Forward Looking Infra-Red ("FLIR") camera and got a heat profile of the land.

Using the results of the FLIR profile and other evidence, the police were able to establish a reasonable and probable grounds that there was a grow operation on Tessling's property which allowed them to get a search warrant to search the property.

The police searched the property and found the marijuana growing operation that was estimated at $15,000 to $22,500. Tessling was charged with drug trafficking and possession of weapons.

At trial, Tessling argued that the FLIR scan was a violation of his right against unreasonable search and seizure, and that the evidence should be excluded from trial. Tessling was convicted, however his conviction was overturned by the provincial Court of Appeal.

The issue before the Supreme Court was whether the use of a thermal imagery such as the FLIR camera violates the right against unreasonable search and seizure.

The Court held that the thermal imagery did not violate the accuser’s right to be free from unreasonable search and seizure, with Iacobucci and Arbour JJ abstaining.

== Opinion of the Court ==
The Court judgment, number 29670, was given by Binnie, J., and analysed the application of section 8.

== See also ==
- List of Supreme Court of Canada cases (McLachlin Court)
- Kyllo v. United States
