= Louise Charron =

Retired judge of the Supreme Court of Canada

Louise Charron CC

Puisne Justice of the Supreme Court of Canada
- In office October 4, 2004 – August 30, 2011
- Nominated by: Paul Martin
- Preceded by: Frank Iacobucci/Louise Arbour
- Succeeded by: Andromache Karakatsanis

Personal details
- Born: March 2, 1951 (age 75) Sturgeon Falls, Ontario, Canada
- Education: Carleton University (BA); University of Ottawa (LLB)

Louise Charron, CC (French pronunciation: [lwiz ʃaʁɔ̃]; born March 2, 1951) is a Canadian retired jurist. She was appointed to the Supreme Court of Canada in October 2004, becoming the first native-born Franco-Ontarian Supreme Court judge. (Note: This distinction has sometimes been attributed to Louise Arbour, but Arbour was born and raised Québécoise.) She retired in August 2011.

== Career ==
Born in Sturgeon Falls, Ontario, Charron received a Bachelor of Arts degree from Carleton University in 1972, her Bachelor of Law degree from the University of Ottawa in 1975, and was called to the Bar of Ontario in 1977. She practiced civil litigation before joining the Crown Attorney's office in 1980. She then became a law professor at the University of Ottawa, teaching French common law until 1988.

She was appointed to the District Court of Ontario in 1988 and to the Court of Appeal for Ontario in 1995. Though she was eligible to sit on the bench until 2026, her retirement was announced in May 2011, and became effective August 30, 2011. She was appointed a Companion of the Order of Canada on December 30, 2012.

== See also ==
- Reasons of the Supreme Court of Canada by Justice Charron
