= Morris Fish =

Canadian Supreme Court judge (born 1938)

Morris Fish CC KC

Puisne Justice of the Supreme Court of Canada
- In office August 5, 2003 – August 31, 2013
- Nominated by: Jean Chrétien
- Preceded by: Charles Gonthier
- Succeeded by: Clément Gascon

Personal details
- Born: November 16, 1938 (age 87) Montreal, Quebec, Canada

Morris Jacob Fish, CC KC (born November 16, 1938) is a Canadian lawyer who served as a judge of the Supreme Court of Canada from 2003 to 2013.

Born in Montreal, Quebec, the son of Aaron S. Fish and Zlata Grober, he received a Bachelor of Arts (with distinction) in 1959 and a Bachelor of Law (first class honours) in 1962 from McGill University (where he was selected as the Articles Editor for the McGill Law Journal). Upon graduation from law school, he was awarded the Greenshields Prize, the Crankshaw Prize for Highest Standing in Criminal Law and the Macdonald Travelling Scholarship.

He practised law mostly in Quebec for the law firm Cohen, Leithman, Kaufman, Yarosky & Fish which later became Yarosky, Fish, Zigman, Isaacs & Daviault between 1967 and 1989. He also lectured at a number of Canadian law schools. His expertise in practice and teaching was criminal law. He was appointed to the Quebec Court of Appeal on June 30, 1989 and was elevated to the Supreme Court of Canada on August 5, 2003, replacing Charles Gonthier. He retired from the Court on August 31, 2013.

Since November 29, 2018, Fish has served as the Special Advisor on Wrongful Convictions to the Minister of Justice and Attorney General of Canada.

== Awards ==
- Appointed Queen's Counsel, 1984
- Honorary degrees from:
  - Yeshiva University, 2009
  - McGill University, 2001
- G. Arthur Martin medal for outstanding contribution to criminal justice, 2011
- Invested as a companion of the Order of Canada, 2016

== See also ==
- Baron Byng High School
- Reasons of the Supreme Court of Canada by Justice Fish
