= Louis LeBel =

Judge of the Supreme Court of Canada (1939–2023)

Louis LeBel CC

Puisne Justice of the Supreme Court of Canada
- In office January 7, 2000 – November 30, 2014
- Nominated by: Jean Chrétien
- Preceded by: Beverley McLachlin
- Succeeded by: Suzanne Côté

Personal details
- Born: November 30, 1939 Quebec City, Quebec, Canada
- Died: June 8, 2023 (aged 83) Quebec City, Quebec, Canada
- Spouse: Louise Poudrier (m. 1965)
- Children: 3 - 2 sons, 1 daughter
- Education: St. Charles Garnier College; Université Laval; University of Toronto

Louis LeBel CC (November 30, 1939 – June 8, 2023) was a Canadian jurist who was a puisne justice of the Supreme Court of Canada. He served on the Court from 2000 to 2014.

LeBel was born in Quebec City. He was the son of lawyer Paul LeBel, Q.C.

LeBel went to school at the Collège des Jésuites, graduating with a BA in 1958. LeBel earned his law degree at Université Laval in 1962 and went on to get an LL.M from the University of Toronto in 1966. He was a top student, winning the Governor General's medal, the Lieutenant General's medal and the Tessier silver medal.

LeBel was called to the bar in 1962 and practised in Quebec City in several firms until 1984. During this period he taught at the University of Ottawa and Université Laval.

On June 28, 1984, he was appointed directly to the Quebec Court of Appeal. He stayed on the Court until he was appointed by Jean Chrétien to the Supreme Court of Canada in 2000.

LeBel was married to Louise Poudrier on August 28, 1965. His wife is also a lawyer and taught at Université Laval until 2000. They had three children; Paul, Catherine and François, who was appointed a judge of the Court of Quebec in 2018.

LeBel died on June 8, 2023, at the age of 83.

== See also ==
- Reasons of the Supreme Court of Canada by Justice LeBel
