= Reasons of the Supreme Court of Canada by Justice Binnie =

This is a list of all the opinions written by Ian Binnie during his tenure as puisne justice of the Supreme Court of Canada.

== 1998 ==
Case name	Issue	Co-authored by	Joined by
Union of New Brunswick Indians v New Brunswick (Minister of Finance), [1998] 1 SCR 1161	Taxation of aboriginals	None	Gonthier J.
Eurig Estate (Re) [1998] 2 SCR 565	Constitutional law, estates	None	McLachlin J.
Consortium Developments (Clearwater) Ltd v Sarnia (City of) [1998] 3 SCR 3	Federalism, municipal law	None	Unanimous
R v Rose [1998] 3 SCR 262	Charter; right to full answer and defence; jury instruction	None	Lamer CJ and McLachlin, Major JJ

== 1999 ==
Ian Binnie 1999 statistics

?	Majority or Plurality	?	Concurrence	?	Other
?	Dissent	?	Concurrence/dissent	Total =	?
Written opinions = ?		Oral opinions = ?		Unanimous opinions = ?

Case name	Issue	Co-authored by	Joined by
Cadbury Schweppes Inc v FBI Foods Ltd [1999] 1 SCR 142	Breach of confidence	None	Unanimous
Sail Labrador Ltd v Challenge One (The) [1999] 1 SCR 265	Contract law, substantial performance	None	None
R v Campbell [1999] 1 SCR 565	Abuse of process; solicitor-client privilege	None	Unanimous
R v Beaulac [1999] 1 SCR 768	Language of accused	Lamer C.J.	None
R v Stone [1999] 2 SCR 290	Defence of automatism; sentencing	None	Lamer CJ, Iacobucci and Major JJ
Jacobi v Griffiths [1999] 2 SCR 570	Vicarious liability of employer	None	Cory, Iacobucci and Major JJ
M & D Farm Ltd v Manitoba Agricultural Credit Corp [1999] 2 SCR 961	Paramountcy doctrine; federalism	None	Unanimous
Winters v Legal Services Society [1999] 3 SCR 160	Legal services in prison	None	Lamer CJ and L'Heureux-Dubé, Gonthier, McLachlin, Iacobucci, Major and Bastarache JJ
R v Marshall [1999] 3 SCR 456	aboriginal fishing rights	None	Lamer CJ and L'Heureux-Dubé, Cory and Iacobucci JJ
Des Champs v Conseil des écoles séparées catholiques de langue française de Prescott-Russell [1999] 3 SCR 281	Public authorities	None	L'Heureux-Dubé, Gonthier, Cory, McLachlin and Iacobucci JJ
Abouchar v Ottawa-Carleton French-language School Board – Public Sector [1999] 3 SCR 343	Public Authorities	None	L'Heureux-Dubé, Gonthier, Cory, McLachlin and Iacobucci JJ

== 2000 ==
Ian Binnie 2000 statistics

?	Majority or Plurality	?	Concurrence	?	Other
?	Dissent	?	Concurrence/dissent	Total =	?
Written opinions = ?		Oral opinions = ?		Unanimous opinions = ?

Case name	Issue	Co-authored by	Joined by
R v Brooks [2000] 1 SCR 237; 2000 SCC 11	jailhouse informant evidence	None	None
Granovsky v Canada (Minister of Employment and Immigration) [2000] 1 SCR 703; 2000 SCC 28	equality rights the disabled	None	Unanimous
R v Jolivet [2000] 1 SCR 751; 2000 SCC 29	evidence	None	Unanimous
FN (Re) [2000] 1 SCR 880; 2000 SCC 35	non-disclosure of young offenders information	None	Unanimous
Will-Kare Paving & Contracting Ltd v Canada [2000] 1 SCR 915; 2000 SCC 36	taxation	None	Gonthier and McLachlin JJ
R v J-LJ [2000] 2 SCR 600; 2000 SCC 51	Expert evidence; R. v. Mohan test	None	Unanimous
Free World Trust v Électro Santé Inc [2000] 2 SCR 1024; 2000 SCC 66	Patent infringement	None	Unanimous
Whirlpool Corp v Camco Inc [2000] 2 SCR 1067; 2000 SCC 67	Patent construction	None	Unanimous
Whirlpool Corp v Maytag Corp [2000] 2 SCR 1116; 2000 SCC 68	Patent construction	None	Unanimous
Little Sisters Book and Art Emporium v Canada (Minister of Justice) [2000] 2 SCR 1120, 2000 SCC 69	Freedom of expression	None	McLachlin CJ and L'Heureux‑Dubé, Gonthier, Major and Bastarache JJ

== 2001 ==
Ian Binnie 2001 statistics

?	Majority or Plurality	?	Concurrence	?	Other
?	Dissent	?	Concurrence/dissent	Total =	?
Written reasons = ?		Oral reasons = ?		Unanimous reasons = ?

Case name	Issue	Co-authored by	Joined by
R v Parrott [2001] 1 SCR 178; 2001 SCC 3	Hearsay exception	None	Major, Bastarache and Arbour JJ
Ellis-Don Ltd v Ontario (Labour Relations Board) [2001] 1 SCR 221; 2001 SCC 4	natural justice; judicial review	None	Major J
Mitchell v MNR [2001] 1 SCR 911; 2001 SCC 33	Aboriginal rights	None	Major J
Mount Sinai Hospital Center v Quebec (Minister of Health and Social Services) [2001] 2 SCR 281; 2001 SCC 41	judicial review; ministerial discretion	None	Major J
Danyluk v Ainsworth Technologies Inc [2001] 2 SCR 460; 2001 SCC 44	employment law; issue estoppel	None	Unanimous
Saint-Romuald (City of) v Olivier [2001] 2 SCR 898; 2001 SCC 57	Zoning by-laws	None	McLachlin CJ and Major and Arbour JJ
Naylor Group Inc v Ellis-Don Construction Ltd [2001] 2 SCR 943; 2001 SCC 58	Contracts	None	Unanimous
Proulx v Quebec (AG) [2001] 3 SCR 9; 2001 SCC 66	Malicious prosecution	Iacobucci J	McLachlin CJ and Major J
Holt Cargo Systems Inc v ABC Containerline NV (Trustees of) [2001] 3 SCR 907; 2001 SCC 90	Maritime law	None	Unanimous
Antwerp Bulkcarriers, NV (Re) [2001] 3 SCR 951; 2001 SCC 91	Bankruptcy	None	Unanimous
Sam Lévy & Associés Inc v Azco Mining Inc [2001] 3 SCR 978; 2001 SCC 92	Bankruptcy	None	Unanimous

== 2002 ==
Ian Binnie 2002 statistics

?	Majority or Plurality	?	Concurrence	?	Other
?	Dissent	?	Concurrence/dissent	Total =	?
Written opinions = ?		Oral opinions = ?		Unanimous opinions = ?

Case name	Issue	Co-authored by	Joined by
R v Regan [2002] 1 SCR 297; 2002 SCC 12	abuse of process	None	Iacobucci, Major and Arbour JJ
Mackin v New Brunswick (Minister of Finance); Rice v New Brunswick [2002] 1 SCR 405; 2002 SCC 13	judicial independence; constitutional remedies	None	LeBel J
R v Fliss [2002] 1 SCR 535; 2002 SCC 16	Charter, search and seizure	None	Iacobucci, Major and Bastarache JJ
Whiten v Pilot Insurance Co [2002] 1 SCR 595; 2002 SCC 18	Insurance, damages	None	McLachlin CJ and L'Heureux‑Dubé, Gonthier, Major and Arbour JJ
Performance Industries Ltd v Sylvan Lake Golf & Tennis Club Ltd [2002] 1 SCR 678; 2002 SCC 19	Equitable remedies in contract	None	McLachlin CJ and L'Heureux‑Dubé, Gonthier, Major and Arbour JJ
R v Sheppard [2002] 1 SCR 869; 2002 SCC 26	Duty to give reasons in criminal trials	None	Unanimous
R v Braich [2002] 1 SCR 903; 2002 SCC 27	Duty to give reason for judgment	None	Unanimous
Théberge v Galerie d'Art du Petit Champlain Inc [2002] 2 SCR 336, 2002 SCC 34	Copyright, fixation	None	McLachlin CJ and Iacobucci and Major JJ
R v Handy [2002] 2 SCR 908, 2002 SCC 56	Similar fact evidence	None	Unanimous
R v Shearing [2002] 3 SCR 33; 2002 SCC 58	Similar fact evidence	None	McLachlin CJ and Iacobucci, Major, Bastarache, Arbour and LeBel JJ
Somersall v Friedman [2002] 3 SCR 109; 2002 SCC 59	Insurance, subrogation	None	Major J
R v Neil [2002] 3 SCR 631; 2002 SCC 70	Conflict of interest, lawyers	None	Unanimous
Harvard College v Canada (Commissioner of Patents) [2002] 4 SCR 45; 2002 SCC 76	patent of higher lifeforms	None	McLachlin CJ and Major and Arbour JJ
Apotex Inc v Wellcome Foundation Ltd [2002] 4 SCR 153; 2002 SCC 77	Patent validity	None	Unanimous
Wewaykum Indian Band v Canada [2002] 4 SCR 245; 2002 SCC 79	Crown’s fiduciary duty to aboriginals	None	Unanimous

== 2003 ==
Ian Binnie 2003 statistics

?	Majority or Plurality	?	Concurrence	?	Other
?	Dissent	?	Concurrence/dissent	Total =	?
Written opinions = ?		Oral opinions = ?		Unanimous opinions = ?

Case name	Issue	Co-authored by	Joined by
Goudie v Ottawa (City of) [2003] 1 SCR 141; 2003 SCC 14	Labour relations	None	Unanimous
Canadian Union of Public Employees v Ontario (Minister of Labour) [2003] 1 SCR 539; 2003 SCC 29	Labour relations, judicial review, appointment of arbitrators	None	Gonthier, Iacobucci, Arbour, LeBel and Deschamps JJ
R v Owen [2003] 1 SCR 779; 2003 SCC 33	Mental disorder	None	McLachlin CJ and Gonthier, Iacobucci, Major, Bastarache, LeBel and Deschamps JJ
R v Asante-Mensah [2003] 2 SCR 3; 2003 SCC 38	citizen's arrest; use of force	None	Unanimous
Unifund Assurance Co v Insurance Corp of British Columbia [2003] 2 SCR 63; 2003 SCC 40	Interprovincial jurisdiction	None	McLachlin CJ and Iacobucci and LeBel JJ
R v Williams [2003] 2 SCR 134; 2003 SCC 41	Assault, Non‑disclosure of HIV status	None	Unanimous
Beals v Saldanha [2003] 3 SCR 416; 2003 SCC 72	conflict of laws; enforcement of judgment	None	Iacobucci J
R v Wu [2003] 3 SCR 530; 2003 SCC 73	Conditional sentencing	None	McLachlin CJ and Gonthier, Iacobucci, Major, Bastarache, Arbour and LeBel JJ
R v Malmo-Levine; R v Caine [2003] 3 SCR 571; 2003 SCC 74	Charter of Rights, division of powers, prohibition of marijuana	Gonthier J	McLachlin CJ and Iacobucci, Major and Bastarache JJ
R v Clay [2003] 3 SCR 735; 2003 SCC 75	Charter, section 7	Gonthier J	McLachlin CJ and Iacobucci, Major and Bastarache JJ

== 2004 ==
Ian Binnie 2004 statistics

?	Majority or Plurality	?	Concurrence	?	Other
?	Dissent	?	Concurrence/dissent	Total =	?
Written opinions = ?		Oral opinions = ?		Unanimous opinions = ?

Case name	Issue	Co-authored by	Joined by
Canadian Foundation for Children, Youth and the Law v Canada (AG) [2004] 1 SCR 76; 2004 SCC 4	Charter, spanking	None	None
R v Smith [2004] 1 SCR 385; 2004 SCC 14	Death of appellant	None	Unanimous
Penetanguishene Mental Health Centre v Ontario (AG) [2004] 1 SCR 498; 2004 SCC 20	Mental disorder defence	None	Unanimous
Pinet v St Thomas Psychiatric Hospital [2004] 1 SCR 528; 2004 SCC 21	Mental disorder defence	None	Unanimous
British Columbia v Canadian Forest Products Ltd [2004] 2 SCR 74; 2004 SCC 38	Damage to public lands	None	McLachlin CJ and Iacobucci, Major, Arbour and Deschamps JJ
Quebec (AG) v Quebec (Human Rights Tribunal) [2004] 2 SCR 223; 2004 SCC 40	Jurisdiction of human rights tribunals	None	Fish J
Application under s 83.28 of the Criminal Code (Re) [2004] 2 SCR 248; 2004 SCC 42	Charter, terrorism	None	None
R v Kerr [2004] 2 SCR 371; 2004 SCC 44	Weapons offences	None	None
Society of Composers, Authors and Music Publishers of Canada v Canadian Assn of Internet Providers [2004] 2 SCR 427; 2004 SCC 45	Copyright infringement	None	McLachlin CJ and Iacobucci, Major, Bastarache, Arbour, Deschamps and Fish JJ
Syndicat Northcrest v Amselem [2004] 2 SCR 551; 2004 SCC 47	Freedom of religion	None	None
Gilles E Néron Communication Marketing Inc v Chambre des notaires du Québec [2004] 3 SCR 95; 2004 SCC 53	Defamation, television broadcasts	None	None
Hodge v Canada (Minister of Human Resources Development) [2004] 3 SCR 357; 2004 SCC 65	Charter equality rights, marriage	None	Unanimous
Newfoundland (Treasury Board) v Newfoundland and Labrador Association of Public and Private Employees [2004] 3 SCR 381; 2004 SCC 66	Charter equality rights, gender, reasonable limits	None	Unanimous
R v Tessling [2004] 3 SCR 432; 2004 SCC 67	Charter, search and seizure	None	Unanimous
Pacific National Investments Ltd v Victoria (City of) [2004] 3 SCR 575; 2004 SCC 75	Zoning, unjust enrichment	None	Unanimous
R v Lohrer [2004] 3 SCR 732; 2004 SCC 80	Misapprehension of evidence	None	Unanimous

== 2005 ==
Ian Binnie 2005 statistics

?	Majority or Plurality	?	Concurrence	?	Other
?	Dissent	?	Concurrence/dissent	Total =	?
Written opinions = ?		Oral opinions = ?		Unanimous opinions = ?

Case name	Issue	Co-authored by	Joined by
Vaughan v Canada [2005] 1 SCR 146; 2005 SCC 11	Labour law; early retirement	None	Major, LeBel, Deschamps, Fish, Abella and Charron JJ
Bristol-Myers Squibb Co v Canada (AG) [2005] 1 SCR 533; 2005 SCC 26	Patents, Notice of compliance	None	McLachlin CJ and LeBel, Deschamps, Fish and Abella JJ
Canada (House of Commons) v Vaid [2005] 1 SCR 667, 2005 SCC 30	Parliamentary privilege	None	Unanimous
Chaoulli v Quebec (AG) [2005] 1 SCR 791; 2005 SCC 35	Charter, section 7; prohibition on medical insurance	LeBel J	Fish J
Mugesera v Canada (Minister of Citizenship and Immigration) [2005] 2 SCR 100; 2005 SCC 40	Administrative law; crimes against humanity; deportation orders	Unanimous	None
R v GR [2005] 2 SCR 371; 2005 SCC 45	Incest	None	McLachlin CJ and Major, Fish and Charron JJ
EB v Order of the Oblates of Mary Immaculate in the Province of British Columbia [2005] 3 SCR 45; 2005 SCC 60	Vicarious liability	None	McLachlin CJ and Major, Bastarache, LeBel, Deschamps, Fish and Charron JJ
Montréal (City of) v 2952-1366 Québec Inc [2005] 3 SCR 141; 2005 SCC 62	Freedom of expression; public property	None	None
Mikisew Cree First Nation v Canada (Minister of Canadian Heritage) [2005] 3 SCR 388; 2005 SCC 69	Aboriginal treaty rights; duty to consult	None	Unanimous
Merk v International Association of Bridge, Structural, Ornamental and Reinforcing Iron Workers, Local 771 [2005] 3 SCR 425; 2005 SCC 70	Whistleblowers	None	McLachlin CJ and Major, LeBel, Abella and Charron JJ
R v Spence [2005] 3 SCR 458; 2005 SCC 71	Jury selection; judicial notice	None	Unanimous
R v Henry [2005] 3 SCR 609; 2005 SCC 76	Right against self-incrimination; obiter dicta	None	Unanimous

== 2006 ==
Ian Binnie 2006 statistics

7	Majority or Plurality	1	Concurrence	0	Other
3	Dissent	0	Concurrence/dissent	Total =	11
Written reasons= ?		Oral reasons= ?		Unanimous reasons= ?

Case name	Issue	Co-authored by	Joined by
Young v Bella [2006] 1 SCR 108; 2006 SCC 3	Duty of care	McLachlin CJ	Unanimous
ATCO Gas & Pipelines Ltd v Alberta (Energy & Utilities Board) [2006] 1 SCR 140; 2006 SCC 4	Judicial review	None	McLachlin CJ and Fish J
Mattel, Inc v 3894207 Canada Inc [2006] 1 SCR 772; 2006 SCC 22	Trade-marks	None	McLachlin CJ and Bastarache, Deschamps, Fish, Abella and Charron JJ
Veuve Clicquot Ponsardin v Boutiques Cliquot Ltée [2006] 1 SCR 824; 2006 SCC 23	Trade-marks, confusion, goodwill	None	Unanimous
Canada 3000 Inc, Re; Inter‑Canadian (1991) Inc (Trustee of) [2006] 1 SCR 865; 2006 SCC 24	Seizure of property, airplanes; statutory interpretation	None	Unanimous
Leskun v Leskun [2006] 1 SCR 920; 2006 SCC 25	Misconduct in spousal support	None	Unanimous
Celanese Canada Inc v Murray Demolition Corp; 2006 SCC 36	Anton Piller orders; solicitor-client privilege	None	Unanimous
Imperial Oil Ltd v Canada; Inco Ltd v Canada; 2006 SCC 46	Taxation, business income	None	Fish and Charron JJ
AstraZeneca Canada Inc v Canada (Minister of Health); 2006 SCC 49	Patents; notice of compliance	None	Unanimous
R v Sappier; R v Gray; 2006 SCC 54	Logging rights	None	None
McDiarmid Lumber Ltd v God's Lake First Nation; 2006 SCC 58	Aboriginal law, property rights	None	Fish and Abella JJ

== 2007 ==
Case name	Issue	Co-authored by	Joined by
Little Sisters Book and Art Emporium v Canada (Commissioner of Customs and Revenue); 2007 SCC 2			
R v Beaudry; 2007 SCC 5			
Canadian Western Bank v Alberta; 2007 SCC 22			
British Columbia (AG) v Lafarge Canada Inc; 2007 SCC 23			
Strother v 3464920 Canada Inc; 2007 SCC 24			
R v Hape; 2007 SCC 26			
R v Clayton; 2007 SCC 32			
Kerr v Danier Leather Inc; 2007 SCC 45			
Citadel General Assurance Co v Vytlingam; 2007 SCC 46			
Lumbermens Mutual Casualty Co v Herbison; 2007 SCC 47			

== 2010 ==
Statistics

XXXXX	Majority or Plurality	XXX	Concurrence	XXXX	Other
XXXX	Dissent	XXXX	Concurrence/dissent	Total =	XXXXXX
Written opinions = XXX		Oral opinions = XXX		Unanimous decisions = XXX

Case name	Issue	Co-authored by	Joined by
XXX; CITATIONS [URL]	XXX	XXX	XXX
XXX; CITATIONS [URL]	XXX	XXX	XXX

== 2011 ==
Statistics

XXXXX	Majority or Plurality	XXX	Concurrence	XXXX	Other
XXXX	Dissent	XXXX	Concurrence/dissent	Total =	XXXXXX
Written opinions = XXX		Oral opinions = XXX		Unanimous decisions = XXX

Case name	Issue	Co-authored by	Joined by
R v Carron; 2011 SCC 5	Whether a superior court has inherent jurisdiction to grant interim costs in litigation taking place in the provincial court	–	McLachlin CJ and LeBel, Deschamps, Fish, Charron, Rothstein and Cromwell JJ
R v White; 2011 SCC 13	Whether the trial judge's failure to state to the jury that post-offence conduct has no probative value constituted an error of law	–	McLachlin CJ and Fish J
R v SD; 2011 SCC 14	Whether the fact the accused was convicted of an offence on a date other than the one referred to in the indictment affected trial fairness	–	LeBel, Deschamps, Charron, Rothstein and Cromwell JJ
Seidel v TELUS Communications Inc; 2011 SCC 15	Whether provincial legislation, stating that contractual agreements to waive or release rights, benefits or protects under the legislation area void, renders an arbitration clause in a standard form cell phone contract void	–	McLachlin CJ and Fish, Rothstein and Cromwell JJ
British Columbia (AG) v Malik; 2011 SCC 18 [URL]	Whether a prior decision is admissible only where respondents are precluded by issue estoppel or abuse of process from relitigating the facts adduced — Whether a superior court judge hearing an ex parte application for an interlocutory order may admit findings and conclusions of prior judicial decision into evidence — Whether there was sufficient admissible evidence adduced to justify an Anton Piller order	–	Unanimous
R v O'Brien; 2011 SCC 29	Whether trial judge's error in not excluding bad character evidence and in not specifically addressing that evidence in his reasons caused a substantial wrong or a miscarriage of justice	–	LeBel J
Canada (AG) v Mavi; 2011 SCC 30	Whether Immigration and Refugee Protection Act provides discretion to enforce immigration sponsorship debt — Whether Ontario debt recovery policy improperly fettering exercise of statutory discretion	–	Unanimous
R v Barros; 2011 SCC 51	Whether investigator hired by the defence is bound by informer privilege — Whether trial judge committed errors of law allowing appellate review of acquittals for offences of obstructing justice and extortion	–	McLachlin CJ and LeBel, Deschamps, Abella, Charron and Rothstein JJ
R v Sarrazin; 2011 SCC 54	Whether the potential verdict of attempted murder should have been left with the jury by the trial judge	–	McLachlin CJ and LeBel, Fish, Abella and Charron JJ
Lax Kw'alaams Indian Band v Canada (AG); 2011 SCC 56	First Nations claiming rights to commercial harvesting and sale of all species of fish within their traditional waters, and whether pre-contact trade in fish product could evolve into modern commercial fishery — Whether historical record supported existence of fiduciary duty to grant claimants right to modern commercial fishery	–	Unanimous
Alberta (Information and Privacy Commissioner) v Alberta Teachers' Association; 2011 SCC 61	Whether a matter that was not raised at a tribunal may be judicially reviewed — Whether a tribunal's decision relating to the interpretation of its home statute or statutes closely connected to its functions is reviewable on a standard of reasonableness or correctness	–	Deschamps J

== 2012 ==
Statistics

0	Majority or Plurality	0	Concurrence	0	Other
1	Dissent	0	Concurrence/dissent	Total =	1
Written opinions = 1		Oral opinions = 0		Unanimous decisions = 0

Case name	Issue	Co-authored by	Joined by
R v DAI; 2012 SCC 5	Whether adult witnesses with mental disabilities must demonstrate understanding of nature of obligation to tell truth in order to be deemed competent to testify	–	LeBel and Fish JJ
