= 2003 reasons of the Supreme Court of Canada =

The table below lists the reasons delivered from the bench by the Supreme Court of Canada during 2003. The table illustrates what reasons were filed by each justice in each case, and which justices joined each reason. This list, however, does not include decisions on motions.

Of the 75 judgments released in 2003, 14 were oral judgments, 49 were unanimous, there was no pluralities, and no motions.

== Reasons ==
Case name	Argued	Decided	McLachlin	Gothier	Iacobucci	Major	Bastarache	Binnie	Arbour	LeBel	Deschamps	Fish
R v Wise, [2003] 1 S.C.R. 3; 2003 SCC 1	January 21, 2003	January 21, 2003	V									
R v Pelletier, [2003] 1 S.C.R. 4; 2003 SCC 2	January 21, 2003	January 21, 2003										
Siemens v Manitoba (AG), [2003] 1 S.C.R. 6; 2003 SCC 3	October 31, 2002	January 30, 2003										
R v RR, [2003] 1 S.C.R. 37; 2003 SCC 4	February 11, 2003	February 11, 2003			V							
R v Harriott, [2003] 1 S.C.R. 39; 2003 SCC 5	February 11, 2003	February 11, 2003	V									
R v Zinck, [2003] 1 S.C.R. 41; 2003 SCC 6	October 7, 2002	February 20, 2003										
R v Feeley, [2003] 1 S.C.R. 64; 2003 SCC 7	February 20, 2003	February 20, 2003							V			
Canada (Information Commissioner) v Canada (Commissioner of the Royal Canadian Mounted Police), [2003] 1 S.C.R. 66; 2003 SCC 8	October 29, 2002	March 6, 2003										
Markevich v Canada, [2003] 1 S.C.R. 94; 2003 SCC 9	December 4, 2002	March 6, 2001										
Reference Re Earth Future Lottery, [2003] 1 S.C.R. 123; 2003 SCC 10	March 11, 2003	March 11, 2003	V									
Case name	Argued	Decided	McLachlin	Gothier	Iacobucci	Major	Bastarache	Binnie	Arbour	LeBel	Deschamps	Fish
R v MS, [2003] 1 S.C.R. 125; 2003 SCC 11	March 13, 2003	March 13, 2003			V							
R v Willis, [2003] 1 S.C.R. 127; 2003 SCC 12	March 14, 2003	March 14, 2003		V								
Allen v Alberta, [2003] 1 S.C.R. 128; 2003 SCC 13	December 10, 2002	March 20, 2003										
Goudie v Ottawa (City of), [2003] 1 S.C.R. 141; 2003 SCC 14	December 10, 2002	March 20, 2003										
R v Knight; R v Hay, [2003] 1 S.C.R. 156; 2003 SCC 15	March 20, 2003	March 20, 2003							V			
Martin v American International Assurance Life Co, [2003] 1 S.C.R. 158; 2003 SCC 16	October 28, 2002	March 21, 2003										
Desputeaux v Éditions Chouette (1987) inc, [2003] 1 S.C.R. 178; 2003 SCC 17	November 6, 2002	March 21, 2003										
R v Allen, [2003] 1 S.C.R. 223; 2003 SCC 18	March 21, 2003	March 21, 2003			V							
Dr Q v College of Physicians and Surgeons of British Columbia, [2003] 1 S.C.R. 226; 2003 SCC 19	October 2, 2002	April 3, 2003										
Law Society of New Brunswick v Ryan, [2003] 1 S.C.R. 247; 2003 SCC 20	October 1, 2002	April 3, 2003										
Case name	Argued	Decided	McLachlin	Gothier	Iacobucci	Major	Bastarache	Binnie	Arbour	LeBel	Deschamps	Fish
R v PA, [2003] 1 S.C.R. 275; 2003 SCC 21	April 14, 2003	April 14, 2003		V								
R v Larue, [2003] 1 S.C.R. 277; 2003 SCC 22	April 14, 2003	April 14, 2003		V								
R v Arradi, [2003] 1 S.C.R. 280; 2003 SCC 23	December 3, 2002	April 17, 2003										
Miglin v Miglin, [2003] 1 S.C.R. 303; 2003 SCC 24	October 29, 2002	April 17, 2003										
KP Pacific Holdings Ltd v Guardian Insurance Co of Canada, [2003] 1 S.C.R. 433; 2003 SCC 25	February 18, 2003	May 1, 2003										
Churchland v Gore Mutual Insurance Co, [2003] 1 S.C.R. 445; 2003 SCC 26	February 18, 2003	May 1, 2003										
ZI Pompey Industrie v ECU-Line NV, [2003] 1 S.C.R. 450; 2003 SCC 27	October 2, 2002	May 1, 2003										
Barrie Public Utilities v Canadian Cable Television Assn, [2003] 1 S.C.R. 476; 2003 SCC 28	February 19, 2003	May 16, 2003										
Canadian Union of Public Employees v Ontario (Minister of Labour), [2003] 1 S.C.R. 539; 2003 SCC 29	October 8, 2002	May 16, 2003										
R v Buhay, [2003] 1 S.C.R. 631; 2003 SCC 30	November 1, 2002	June 5, 2003										
Case name	Argued	Decided	McLachlin	Gothier	Iacobucci	Major	Bastarache	Binnie	Arbour	LeBel	Deschamps	Fish
Caisse populaire Desjardins de Val-Brillant v Blouin, [2003] 1 S.C.R. 666; 2003 SCC 31	November 6, 2002	June 5, 2003										
Starson v Swayze, [2003] 1 S.C.R. 722; 2003 SCC 32	January 15, 2003	June 6, 2003										
R v Owen, [2003] 1 S.C.R. 779; 2003 SCC 33	January 15, 2003	June 6, 2003										
Trociuk v British Columbia (AG), [2003] 1 S.C.R. 835; 2003 SCC 34	December 4, 2002	June 6, 2003										
Ell v Alberta, [2003] 1 S.C.R. 857; 2003 SCC 35	February 12, 2003	June 26, 2003										
Bell Canada v Canadian Telephone Employees Association, [2003] 1 S.C.R. 884; 2003 SCC 36	January 23, 2003	June 26, 2003										
Figueroa v Canada (AG), [2003] 1 S.C.R. 912; 2003 SCC 37	November 5, 2002	June 27, 2003										
R v Asante-Mensah, [2003] 2 S.C.R. 3; 2003 SCC 38	November 7, 2002	July 11, 2003										
Authorson v Canada (AG), [2003] 2 S.C.R. 40; 2003 SCC 39	April 10, 2003	July 17, 2003										
Unifund Assurance Co v Insurance Corp of British Columbia, [2003] 2 S.C.R. 63; 2003 SCC 40	December 12, 2002	July 17, 2003										
Case name	Argued	Decided	McLachlin	Gothier	Iacobucci	Major	Bastarache	Binnie	Arbour	LeBel	Deschamps	Fish
R v Williams, [2003] 2 S.C.R. 134; 2003 SCC 41	December 3, 2002	September 18, 2003										
Parry Sound (District) Social Services Administration Board v Ontario Public Sector Employees Union, Local 324, [2003] 2 S.C.R. 157; 2003 SCC 42	January 24, 2003	September 18, 2003										
R v Powley, [2003] 2 S.C.R. 207; 2003 SCC 43	March 17, 2003	September 19, 2003										
R v Blais, [2003] 2 S.C.R. 236; 2003 SCC 44	March 18, 2003	September 19, 2003										
Wewaykum Indian Band v Canada, [2003] 2 S.C.R. 259; 2003 SCC 45	June 23, 2003	September 26, 2003										
R v Johnson, [2003] 2 S.C.R. 357; 2003 SCC 46	January 16, 2003	September 26, 2003										
R v Edgar, [2003] 2 S.C.R. 388; 2003 SCC 47	January 16, 2003	September 26, 2003										
R v Smith, [2003] 2 S.C.R. 392; 2003 SCC 48	January 16, 2003	September 26, 2003										
R v Mitchell, [2003] 2 S.C.R. 396; 2003 SCC 49	January 16, 2003	September 26, 2003										
Case name	Argued	Decided	McLachlin	Gothier	Iacobucci	Major	Bastarache	Binnie	Arbour	LeBel	Deschamps	Fish
R v Kelly, [2003] 2 S.C.R. 400; 2003 SCC 50	January 16, 2003	September 26, 2003										
KLB v British Columbia, [2003] 2 S.C.R. 403; 2003 SCC 51	December 5, 6, 2002	October 2, 2003										
EDG v Hammer, [2003] 2 S.C.R. 459; 2003 SCC 52	December 5, 6, 2002	October 2, 2003										
MB v British Columbia, [2003] 2 S.C.R. 477; 2003 SCC 53	December 5, 6, 2002	October 2, 2003										
Nova Scotia (Workers' Compensation Board) v Martin; Nova Scotia (Workers' Compensation Board) v. Laseur, [2003] 2 S.C.R. 504; 2003 SCC 54	December 9, 2002	October 3, 2003										
Paul v British Columbia (Forest Appeals Commission), [2003] 2 S.C.R. 585; 2003 SCC 55	June 11, 2003	October 3, 2003										
R v Bédard, [2003] 2 S.C.R. 621; 2003 SCC 56	October 7, 2003	October 7, 2003								V		
R v Phillips, [2003] 2 S.C.R. 623; 2003 SCC 57	October 17, 2003	October 17, 2003	V									
Imperial Oil Ltd v Quebec (Minister of the Environment), [2003] 2 S.C.R. 624; 2003 SCC 58	February 14, 2003	October 30, 2003										
Gurniak v Nordquist, [2003] 2 S.C.R. 652; 2003 SCC 59	March 12, 2003	October 30, 2003										
Case name	Argued	Decided	McLachlin	Gothier	Iacobucci	Major	Bastarache	Binnie	Arbour	LeBel	Deschamps	Fish
R v SAB, [2003] 2 S.C.R. 678; 2003 SCC 60	March 19, 2003	October 31, 2003										
Deloitte & Touche LLP v Ontario (Securities Commission), [2003] 2 S.C.R. 713; 2003 SCC 61	June 10, 2003	October 31, 2003										
Doucet-Boudreau v Nova Scotia (Minister of Education), [2003] 3 S.C.R. 3; 2003 SCC 62	October 4, 2002	November 6, 2003										
Toronto (City of) v Canadian Union of Public Employees, Local 79, [2003] 3 S.C.R. 77; 2003 SCC 63	February 13, 2003	November 6, 2003										
Ontario v Ontario Public Sector Employees Union, [2003] 3 S.C.R. 149; 2003 SCC 64	February 13, 2003	November 6, 2003										
Vann Niagara Ltd v Oakville (Town of), [2003] 3 S.C.R. 158; 2003 SCC 65	November 23, 2003	January 20, 2004							V			
National Trust Co v H & R Block Canada Inc, [2003] 3 S.C.R. 160; 2003 SCC 66	June 3, 2003	November 14, 2003										
Maranda v Richer, [2003] 3 S.C.R. 193; 2003 SCC 67	May 12, 2003	November 14, 2003										
Quebec (Commission des droits de la personne et des droits de la jeunesse) v Maksteel Québec Inc, [2003] 3 S.C.R. 228; 2003 SCC 68	January 20, 2003	November 14, 2003										
Odhavji Estate v Woodhouse, [2003] 3 S.C.R. 263; 2003 SCC 69	February 17, 2003	December 5, 2003										
Case name	Argued	Decided	McLachlin	Gothier	Iacobucci	Major	Bastarache	Binnie	Arbour	LeBel	Deschamps	Fish
R v Taillefer; R v Duguay, [2003] 3 S.C.R. 307; 2003 SCC 70	January 22, 2003	December 12, 2003										
British Columbia (Minister of Forests) v Okanagan Indian Band, [2003] 3 S.C.R. 371; 2003 SCC 71	June 9, 2003	December 12, 2003										
Beals v Saldanha, [2003] 3 S.C.R. 416; 2003 SCC 72	February 20, 2003	December 18, 2003										
R v Wu, [2003] 3 S.C.R. 530; 2003 SCC 73	June 4, 2003	December 18, 2003										
R v Malmo-Levine; R v Caine, [2003] 3 S.C.R. 571; 2003 SCC 74	May 6, 2003	December 23, 2003							1	2	3	
R v Clay, [2003] 3 S.C.R. 735; 2003 SCC 75	May 6, 2003	December 23, 2003							1	2	3	

== Justices of the Supreme Court ==
Justice	Reasons written	Votes cast	% Majority
Chief Justice Beverley McLachlin	14 / 0 / 0 / 1 / Total=15	48 / 1 / 0 / 1 / Total=50	63 of 65 (96.92%)
Puisne Justice Charles Gonthier (retired August 5, 2003)	10 / 1 / 0 / 0 / Total=11	47 / 1 / 1 / 1 / Total=50	59 of 61 (96.72%)
Puisne Justice Frank Iacobucci	16 / 0 / 0 / 1 / Total=17	48 / 0 / 0 / 2 / Total=50	47 of 50 (94%)
Puisne Justice John C. Major	7 / 0 / 0 / 3 / Total=10	54 / 0 / 0 / 3 / Total=57	61 of 67 (91.04%)
Puisne Justice Michel Bastarache	6 / 1 / 0 / 3 / Total=10	56 / 0 / 0 / 1 / Total=57	63 of 67 (94.03%)
Puisne Justice Ian Binnie	9 / 0 / 0 / 1 / Total=10	58 / 0 / 0 / 2 / Total=60	67 of 70 (95.71%)
Puisne Justice Louise Arbour	16 / 2 / 3 / 1 / Total=22	46 / 0 / 0 / 0 / Total=46	64 of 68 (94.12%)
Puisne Justice Louis LeBel	8 / 3 / 2 / 3 / Total=16	45 / 0 / 0 / 4 / Total=49	56 of 65 (86.15%)
Pusine Justice Marie Deschamps	3 / 1 / 3 / 4 / Total=11	50 / 3 / 0 / 2 / Total=55	57 of 66 (86.36%)
Puisne Justice Morris Fish (appointed August 5, 2003)	0 / 0 / 0 / 0 / Total=00	3 / 0 / 0 / 0 / Total=03	3 of 3 (100%)
This Notes on statistics: A justice is only included in the majority if they have joined or concurred in the Court's judgment in full. Percentages are based only on the cases in which a justice participated, and are rounded to the nearest tenth of a percent.

Delivered the Court's reason
Joined the Court's reason
Filed a concurrence
Joined a concurrence
Filed a dissent
Joined a dissent
Filed a concurrence/dissent
Joined a concurrence/dissent
Did not participate in the judgment
Did not participate in the final disposition of the judgment
Not a member of the Court at the time of hearing or delivering
- Decisions that do not note a Justice delivering the Court's reason are per coram.
- Multiple concurrences and dissents within a case are numbered, with joining votes numbered accordingly. Justices occasionally join multiple reasons in a single case; each vote is subdivided accordingly.
- Multiple unnumbered reasons are jointly written or delivered.
- Decisions that are given orally from the bench are denoted by a "V"; per coram decisions delivered orally from the bench only note a "V" on the most senior justice on the panel.
- An asterisk ( * ) in the Court's opinion denotes that it was only a majority in part or a plurality.
