= Reasons of the Supreme Court of Canada by Justice Bastarache =

This is a list of all the reasons written by Michel Bastarache during his tenure as puisne justice of the Supreme Court of Canada.

== 1998 ==
	Case name	Issue	Co-authored by	Joined by
o	R v Taylor [1998] 1 S.C.R. 26	Interception of private communications	None	Unanimous
	R v Caslake [1998] 1 S.C.R. 51	Search and Seizure; Charter	None	L’Heureux‑Dubé and Gonthier JJ.
	Canada (Human Rights Commission) v Canadian Liberty Net [1998] 1 S.C.R. 626	Contempt of court; human rights commission	None	L’Heureux-Dubé, Gonthier
	R v Charemski [1998] 1 S.C.R. 679	Directed verdict	None	Cory and Iacobucci JJ.
	Aubry v Éditions Vice-Versa inc [1998] 1 S.C.R. 591	Privacy rights; Quebec Charter of Human Rights	None	L’Heureux‑Dubé, Gonthier, Cory and Iacobucci JJ.
	Thomson Newspapers Co v Canada (AG) [1998] 1 S.C.R. 877	right to vote, freedom of expression; publication of election surveys	None	Cory, McLachlin, Iacobucci and Major JJ.
	Pushpanathan v Canada (Minister of Citizenship and Immigration) [1998] 1 S.C.R. 982	Judicial review	None	L’Heureux‑Dubé, Gonthier and McLachlin
	Continental Bank of Canada v Canada [1998] 2 S.C.R. 358	Capital gains tax	None	L’Heureux-Dubé J.
	Continental Bank Leasing Corp v Canada [1998] 2 S.C.R. 298	Taxation	None	L’Heureux-Dubé J.
	R v Cook [1998] 2 S.C.R. 597	Extraterritorial right to counsel	None	Gonthier J.
	Eurig Estate (Re) [1998] 2 S.C.R. 565	Constitutional law; estates	None	Gonthier J.
	Garland v Consumers' Gas Co [1998] 3 S.C.R. 112	Criminal interest rates	None	None
	Canadian Egg Marketing Agency v Richardson [1998] 3 S.C.R. 157	Standing, constitutional challenges	Iacobucci J.	Lamer C.J. and L’Heureux-Dubé, Gonthier, Cory and Binnie JJ.
	R v Rose [1998] 3 S.C.R. 262	Charter; Right to full answer and defence	Cory and Iacobucci JJ.	Gonthier J.
	R v Warsing [1998] 3 S.C.R. 579	Appeals	Lamer C.J.	None

== 1999 ==
Michel Bastarache 1999 statistics

?	Majority or Plurality	?	Concurrence	?	Other
?	Dissent	?	Concurrence/dissent	Total =	?
Written reasons = ?		Oral reasons = ?		Unanimous reasons = ?

Case name	Issue	Co-authored by	Joined by
Chartier v Chartier [1999] 1 S.C.R. 242	family law, in loco parentis	None	Unanimous
Sail Labrador Ltd v Challenge One (The) [1999] 1 S.C.R. 265	Contracts	None	Lamer C.J. and Gonthier, Cory, Iacobucci and Major JJ.
R v Beaulac [1999] 1 S.C.R. 768	Constitutional language rights in court	None	L’Heureux-Dubé, Gonthier, Cory, McLachlin, Iacobucci and Major JJ.
M v H, [1999] 2 S.C.R. 3	Charter, equality rights, definition of "spouse"	None	None
Corbiere v Canada (Minister of Indian and Northern Affairs), [1999] 2 S.C.R. 203	equality rights	McLachlin J.	Lamer C.J., Cory and Major JJ.
R v Stone, [1999] 2 S.C.R. 290	Automatism defence	None	L’Heureux-Dubé, Gonthier, Cory and McLachlin JJ.
R v G(B) [1999] 2 S.C.R. 475	Admission of evidence of accused with mental disorder	None	Lamer C.J. and Cory, Iacobucci, Major and Binnie JJ.
Delisle v Canada (Deputy AG) [1999] 2 S.C.R. 989	RCMP officers exclusion from unions, freedom of expression, association	None	Gonthier, McLachlin and Major JJ.
Francis v Baker [1999] 3 S.C.R. 250	Child support guidelines for income greater than 150K	None	Unanimous
Royal Bank of Canada v W Got Associates Electric Ltd [1999] 3 S.C.R. 408	Fraud, damages	McLachlin	Unanimous
Guarantee Co of North America v Gordon Capital Corp [1999] 3 S.C.R. 423	summary judgment, rescission	Iacobucci	unanimous
65302 British Columbia Ltd v Canada [1999] 3 S.C.R. 804	Income tax levies	None	L’Heureux-Dubé
Renaud v Quebec (Commission des affaires sociales) [1999] 3 S.C.R. 855	Judicial review	None	Unanimous

== 2000 ==
Michel Bastarache 2000 statistics

?	Majority or Plurality	?	Concurrence	?	Other
?	Dissent	?	Concurrence/dissent	Total =	?
Written reasons = ?		Oral reasons = ?		Unanimous reasons = ?

Case name	Issue	Co-authored by	Joined by
Arsenault-Cameron v Prince Edward Island [2000] 1 S.C.R. 3; 2000 SCC 1	Charter, minority language rights	Major J.	Unanimous
R v RNS [2000] 1 S.C.R. 149; 2000 SCC 7	Conditional sentencing	None	None
R v Bunn [2000] 1 S.C.R. 183; 2000 SCC 9	Sentencing	None	L’Heureux-Dubé and Binnie JJ.
R v Brooks [2000] 1 S.C.R. 237; 2000 SCC 11	Jailhouse informants, charge to jury	None	Gonthier and McLachlin JJ.
Ingles v Tutkaluk Construction Ltd [2000] 1 S.C.R. 298; 2000 SCC 12	Tort, duty of care	None	Unanimous
Regina Police Assn Inc v Regina (City of) Board of Police Commissioners [2000] 1 S.C.R. 360; 2000 SCC 14	Labour arbitration	None	Unanimous
Ajax (Town of) v Canadian Auto Workers, Local 222 [2000] 1 S.C.R. 538; 2000 SCC 23	Labour unions	None	L’Heureux-Dubé and Binnie JJ.
Friedmann Equity Developments Inc v Final Note Ltd [2000] 1 S.C.R. 842; 2000 SCC 34	Contracts, mortgages	None	Unanimous
Blencoe v British Columbia (Human Rights Commission) [2000] 2 S.C.R. 307; 2000 SCC 44	Charter, security of person, delay	None	McLachlin C.J. and L’Heureux-Dubé, Gonthier and Major JJ.
Musqueam Indian Band v Glass [2000] 2 S.C.R. 633; 2000 SCC 52	Leases on aboriginal reserves	None	None
R v Charlebois [2000] 2 S.C.R. 674; 2000 SCC 53	Right of appeal	None	Gonthier, Binnie and LeBel JJ.
R v Avetysan [2000] 2 S.C.R. 745; 2000 SCC 56	Charge to jury, beyond reasonable doubt	None	None
R v Knoblauch [2000] 2 S.C.R. 780; 2000 SCC 58	Conditional sentencing	None	L’Heureux-Dubé and Gonthier JJ.
Pacific National Investments Ltd v Victoria (City of) [2000] 2 S.C.R. 919; 2000 SCC 64	Zoning, subdivision	None	Major and Binnie JJ.

== 2001 ==
Michel Bastarache 2001 statistics

?	Majority or Plurality	?	Concurrence	?	Other
?	Dissent	?	Concurrence/dissent	Total =	?
Written reasons = ?		Oral reasons = ?		Unanimous reasons = ?

Case name	Issue	Co-authored by	Joined by
R v Sharpe [2001] 1 S.C.R. 45; 2001 SCC 2	child pornography, freedom of expression	L’Heureux-Dubé and Gonthier JJ.	None
Backman v Canada [2001] 1 S.C.R. 367; 2001 SCC 10	Partnerships	Iacobucci J.	Unanimous
Spire Freezers Ltd v Canada [2001] 1 S.C.R. 391; 2001 SCC 11	Partnerships	Iacobucci J.	Unanimous
Miller v Canada [2001] 1 S.C.R. 407; 2001 SCC 12	Immunity for international organizations	None	Unanimous
Miller v Monit International Inc [2001] 1 S.C.R. 432; 2001 SCC 13	Immunity for international organizations	None	Unanimous
Trinity Western University v British Columbia College of Teachers [2001] 1 S.C.R. 772; 2001 SCC 31	religious freedoms and equality rights; judicial review	Iacobucci J.	McLachlin C.J. and Gonthier, Major, Binnie, Arbour and LeBel JJ
R v Peters; R v Rendon [2001] 1 S.C.R. 997; 2001 SCC 34	Judicial independence	None	Unanimous
Mount Sinai Hospital Center v Quebec (Minister of Health and Social Services) [2001] 2 S.C.R. 281; 2001 SCC 41	Judicial review of ministerial discretion	None	L’Heureux-Dubé, Gonthier, Iacobucci and Major JJ.
Ivanhoe inc v United Food and Commercial Workers, Local 500 [2001] 2 S.C.R. 565; 2001 SCC 47	Labour law; judicial review	None	None
Sept-Îles (City of) v Quebec (Labour Court) [2001] 2 S.C.R. 670; 2001 SCC 48	Labour law; judicial review	None	None
Van de Perre v Edwards [2001] 2 S.C.R. 1014; 2001 SCC 60	custody and access	None	Unanimous
R v Advance Cutting & Coring Ltd [2001] 3 S.C.R. 209; 2001 SCC 70	Labour law; freedom of association	None	McLachlin C.J. and Major and Binnie JJ.
R v Golden [2001] 3 S.C.R. 679; 2001 SCC 83	right against search and seizure; search incident to arrest	None	McLachlin C.J. and Gonthier J.
Dunmore v Ontario (AG) [2001] 3 S.C.R. 1016; 2001 SCC 94	Freedom of association	None	McLachlin C.J. and Gonthier, Iacobucci, Binnie, Arbour and LeBel JJ.

== 2002 ==
Michel Bastarache 2002 statistics

?	Majority or Plurality	?	Concurrence	?	Other
?	Dissent	?	Concurrence/dissent	Total =	?
Written reasons = ?		Oral reasons = ?		Unanimous reasons = ?

Case name	Issue	Co-authored by	Joined by
R v Law [2002] 1 S.C.R. 227; 2002 SCC 10	search and seizure, exclusion of evidence	None	Unanimous
Lavoie v Canada [2002] 1 S.C.R. 769; 2002 SCC 23	equality rights; citizenship	None	Gonthier, Iacobucci and Major JJ.
R v Mac [2002] 1 S.C.R. 856; 2002 SCC 24	Forgery	None	Unanimous
R v Cinous [2002] 2 S.C.R. 3; 2002 SCC 29	Criminal defence; air of reality test	McLachlin C.J.	L’Heureux-Dubé and LeBel JJ.
Smith v Co-operators General Insurance Co [2002] 2 S.C.R. 129; 2002 SCC 30	Limitations of actions	None	None
Housen v Nikolaisen [2002] 2 S.C.R. 235; 2002 SCC 33	Negligence	None	Gonthier, Binnie and LeBel JJ.
R v Hibbert [2002] 2 S.C.R. 445; 2002 SCC 39	Alibis	None	L’Heureux-Dubé J.
Stewart v Canada [2002] 2 S.C.R. 645; 2002 SCC 46			
Walls v Canada [2002] 2 S.C.R. 684; 2002 SCC 47			
Family Insurance Corp v Lombard Canada Ltd [2002] 2 S.C.R. 695; 2002 SCC 48			
Ross River Dena Council Band v Canada [2002] 2 S.C.R. 816; 2002 SCC 54			
B v Ontario (Human Rights Commission) [2002] 3 S.C.R. 403; 2002 SCC 66			
Macdonell v Quebec (Commission d'accès à l'information) [2002] 3 S.C.R. 661; 2002 SCC 71			
Harvard College v Canada (Commissioner of Patents) [2002] 4 S.C.R. 45; 2002 SCC 76			
Nova Scotia (AG) v Walsh [2002] 4 S.C.R. 325; 2002 SCC 83			
Gosselin v Québec (AG) [2002] 4 S.C.R. 429; 2002 SCC 84			

== 2003 ==
Michel Bastarache 2003 statistics

?	Majority or Plurality	?	Concurrence	?	Other
?	Dissent	?	Concurrence/dissent	Total =	?
Written reasons = ?		Oral reasons = ?		Unanimous reasons = ?

Case name	Issue	Co-authored by	Joined by
Miglin v Miglin [2003] 1 S.C.R. 303; 2003 SCC 24			
ZI Pompey Industrie v ECU-Line NV [2003] 1 S.C.R. 450; 2003 SCC 27			
Barrie Public Utilities v Canadian Cable Television Assn [2003] 1 S.C.R. 476; 2003 SCC 28			
Canadian Union of Public Employees v Ontario (Minister of Labour) [2003] 1 S.C.R. 539; 2003 SCC 29			
Bell Canada v Canadian Telephone Employees Association [2003] 1 S.C.R. 884; 2003 SCC 36			
Unifund Assurance Co v Insurance Corp of British Columbia [2003] 2 S.C.R. 63; 2003 SCC 40			
Wewaykum Indian Band v Canada [2003] 2 S.C.R. 259; 2003 SCC 45			
Paul v British Columbia (Forest Appeals Commission) [2003] 2 S.C.R. 585; 2003 SCC 55			
National Trust Co v H & R Block Canada Inc [2003] 3 S.C.R. 160; 2003 SCC 66			
Quebec (Commission des droits de la personne et des droits de la jeunesse) v Maksteel Québec Inc [2003] 3 S.C.R. 228; 2003 SCC 68			

== 2004 ==
Michel Bastarache 2004 statistics

?	Majority or Plurality	?	Concurrence	?	Other
?	Dissent	?	Concurrence/dissent	Total =	?
Written reasons = ?		Oral reasons = ?		Unanimous reasons = ?

Case name	Issue	Co-authored by	Joined by
R v Daoust [2004] 1 S.C.R. 217; 2004 SCC 6			
Transport North American Express Inc v New Solutions Financial Corp [2004] 1 S.C.R. 249; 2004 SCC 7			
United Taxi Drivers' Fellowship of Southern Alberta v Calgary (City of) [2004] 1 S.C.R. 485; 2004 SCC 19			
Hartshorne v Hartshorne [2004] 1 S.C.R. 550; 2004 SCC 22			
Harper v Canada (AG) [2004] 1 S.C.R. 827; 2004 SCC 33			
Quebec (Commission des droits de la pesonne et des droits de la jeunesse) v Quebec (AG) [2004] 2 S.C.R. 185; 2004 SCC 39			
Quebec (AG) v Quebec (Human Rights Tribunal) [2004] 2 S.C.R. 223; 2004 SCC 40			
Application under s 83.28 of the Criminal Code (Re) [2004] 2 S.C.R. 248; 2004 SCC 42			
Vancouver Sun (Re) [2004] 2 S.C.R. 332; 2004 SCC 43			
R v Kerr [2004] 2 S.C.R. 371; 2004 SCC 44			
R v Demers [2004] 2 S.C.R. 489; 2004 SCC 46			
Syndicat Northcrest v Amselem [2004] 2 S.C.R. 551; 2004 SCC 47			
R v Sazant [2004] 3 S.C.R. 635; 2004 SCC 77			

== 2005 ==
Michel Bastarache 2005 statistics

?	Majority or Plurality	?	Concurrence	?	Other
?	Dissent	?	Concurrence/dissent	Total =	?
Written reasons = ?		Oral reasons = ?		Unanimous reasons = ?

Case name	Issue	Co-authored by	Joined by
Marche v Halifax Insurance Co [2005] 1 S.C.R. 47; 2005 SCC 6			
Vaughan v Canada [2005] 1 S.C.R. 146; 2005 SCC 11			
HL v. Canada (AG) [2005] 1 S.C.R. 401; 2005 SCC 25			
Bristol-Myers Squibb Co v Canada (AG) [2005] 1 S.C.R. 533; 2005 SCC 26			
R v Fice [2005] 1 S.C.R. 742; 2005 SCC 32			
Ryan v Moore [2005] 2 S.C.R. 53; 2005 SCC 38			
Mugesera v Canada (Minister of Citizenship and Immigration) [2005] 2 S.C.R. 100; 2005 SCC 40			
R v RC [2005] 3 S.C.R. 99; 2005 SCC 61			
Contino v Leonelli-Contino [2005] 3 S.C.R. 217; 2005 SCC 63			
Dikranian v Quebec (AG) [2005] 3 S.C.R. 530; 2005 SCC 73			
Charlebois v Saint John (City of) [2005] 3 S.C.R. 563; 2005 SCC 74			
R v CD; R v CDK [2005] 3 S.C.R. 668; 2005 SCC 78			
R v Labaye [2005] 3 S.C.R. 728; 2005 SCC 80			
R v Kouri [2005] 3 S.C.R. 789; 2005 SCC 81			
Castillo v Castillo [2005] 3 S.C.R. 870; 2005 SCC 83			

== 2006 ==
Michel Bastarache 2006 statistics

?	Majority or Plurality	?	Concurrence	?	Other
?	Dissent	?	Concurrence/dissent	Total =	??
Written reasons = ?		Oral reasons = ?		Unanimous reasons = ?

Case name	Issue	Co-authored by	Joined by
ATCO Gas & Pipelines Ltd v Alberta (Energy & Utilities Board) [2006] 1 S.C.R. 140; 2006 SCC 4			
Mazzei v British Columbia (Director of Adult Forensic Psychiatric Services); 1 S.C.R. _; 2006 SCC 7			
HJ Heinz Co of Canada Ltd v Canada (AG); 1 S.C.R. _; 2006 SCC 13			
Tranchemontagne v Ontario (Director, Disability Support Program); 1 S.C.R. _; 2006 SCC 14			
R v Gagnon _ S.C.R. _; 2006 SCC 17			
Bisaillon v Concordia University _ S.C.R. _; 2006 SCC 19			
Buschau v Rogers Communications Inc, 2006 SCC 28		None	McLachlin, Charron
DBS v SRG; LJW v TAR; Henry v Henry; Hiemstra v Hiemstra; 2006 SCC 37		None	McLachlin, LeBel, Deschamps
Blank v Canada (Minister of Justice); 2006 SCC 39		None	Charron J.
R v Kong; 2006 SCC 40		None	Unanimous
R v Sappier; R v Gray; 2006 SCC 54			

== 2007 ==
- Kingstreet Investments Ltd v New Brunswick (Finance), [2007] 1 S.C.R. 3, 2007 SCC 1 (majority)
- Little Sisters Book and Art Emporium v Canada (Commissioner of Customs and Revenue), [2007] 1 S.C.R. 38, 2007 SCC 2 (majority)
- R v Trochym, [2007] 1 S.C.R. 239, 2007 SCC 6 (dissent)
- Canada (AG) v Hislop, [2007] 1 S.C.R. 429, 2007 SCC 10 (concurrence)
- R v Bryan, [2007] 1 S.C.R. 527, 2007 SCC 12 (majority)
- Lévis (City of) v Fraternité des policiers de Lévis Inc, [2007] 1 S.C.R. 591, 2007 SCC 14 (majority)
- Canadian Western Bank v Alberta, [2007] 2 S.C.R. 3, 2007 SCC 22 (concurrence)
- British Columbia (AG) v Lafarge Canada Inc, 2007 SCC 23 (concurrence)
- R v Hape, 2007 SCC 26 (concurrence)
- Dell Computer Corp v Union des consommateurs, 2007 SCC 34 (dissent)
- Named Person v Vancouver Sun, [2007] 3 S.C.R 252, 2007 SCC 43 (majority)
- R v Daley, [2007] 3 S.C.R. 523, 2007 SCC 53 (majority)

== 2008 ==
- Dunsmuir v New Brunswick, [2008] 1 S.C.R. 190, 2008 SCC 9 (majority)
- R v Stirling, [2008] 1 S.C.R. 272, 2008 SCC 10 (majority)
- Société de l'assurance automobile du Québec v Cyr, 2008 SCC 13 (majority)
- Société des Acadiens et Acadiennes du Nouveau‑Brunswick Inc v Canada, 2008 SCC 15 (majority)
- Evans v Teamsters Local Union No 31, 2008 SCC 20 (majority)
- R v McLarty, 2008 SCC 26 (dissent)
- Stein v Stein, 2008 SCC 35 (majority)
- R v Kapp, 2008 SCC 41 (concurrence)
- Honda Canada Inc v Keays, 2008 SCC 39 (majority)
