= Reasons of the Supreme Court of Canada by Justice Arbour =

This is a list of all the reasons written by Louise Arbour during her tenure as puisne justice of the Supreme Court of Canada. During her time on the Court she wrote 68 reasons.

== 1999 ==
Case name	Issue	Co-authored by	Joined by
R v Pelletier [1999] 3 SCR 863	Common Bawdy-house	None	McLachlin, Major and Arbour JJ.

== 2000 ==
Louise Arbour 2000 statistics

?	Majority or Plurality	?	Concurrence	?	Other
?	Dissent	?	Concurrence/dissent	Total =	??
Written reasons= ?		Oral reasons= ?		Unanimous reasons= ?

Case name	Issue	Co-authored by	Joined by
R v Biniaris [2000] 1 SCR 381; 2000 SCC 15			
R v Molodowic [2000] 1 SCR 420; 2000 SCC 16			
R v AG [2000] 1 SCR 439; 2000 SCC 17			
R v Wust [2000] 1 SCR 455; 2000 SCC 18			
R v Arthurs [2000] 1 SCR 481; 2000 SCC 19			
R v Arrance [2000] 1 SCR 488; 2000 SCC 20			
R v Oickle [2000] 2 SCR 3; 2000 SCC 38			
R v Morrisey [2000] 2 SCR 90; 2000 SCC 39			
R v Lévesque [2000] 2 SCR 487; 2000 SCC 47			
Winnipeg Child and Family Services v KLW [2000] 2 SCR 519; 2000 SCC 48			
R v Charlebois [2000] 2 SCR 674; 2000 SCC 53			
R v Knoblauch [2000] 2 SCR 780; 2000 SCC 58			

== 2001 ==
Louise Arbour 2001 statistics

?	Majority or Plurality	0	Concurrence	0	Other
0	Dissent	0	Concurrence/dissent	Total =	??
Written reasons= ?		Oral reasons= 1		Unanimous reasons= ?

	Case name	Issue	Co-authored by	Joined by
o	R v Guttman [2001] 1 SCR 363; 2001 SCC 8			
	United States of America v Kwok [2001] 1 SCR 532; 2001 SCC 18			
	United States of America v Cobb [2001] 1 SCR 587; 2001 SCC 19			
	United States of America v Tsioubris [2001] 1 SCR 613; 2001 SCC 20			
	United States of America v Shulman [2001] 1 SCR 616; 2001 SCC 21			
	R v Pan; R v Sawyer [2001] 2 SCR 344; 2001 SCC 42			
	Ivanhoe inc v United Food and Commercial Workers, Local 500 [2001] 2 SCR 565; 2001 SCC 47			
	Sept-Îles (City) v Quebec (Labour Court) [2001] 2 SCR 670; 2001 SCC 48			
	R v Rhee [2001] 3 SCR 364; 2001 SCC 71			
	R v Nette [2001] 3 SCR. 488; 2001 SCC 78			
	R v Golden [2001] 3 SCR 679; 2001 SCC 83			
	R v Khan [2001] 3 SCR 823; 2001 SCC 86			

== 2002 ==
Louise Arbour 2002 statistics

?	Majority or Plurality	?	Concurrence	?	Other
?	Dissent	?	Concurrence/dissent	Total =	??
Written reasons= ?		Oral reasons= ?		Unanimous reasons= ?

	Case name	Issue	Co-authored by	Joined by
o	R v Benji [2002] 1 SCR 142; 2002 SCC 5			
	Moreau-Bérubé v New Brunswick (Judicial Council) [2002] 1 SCR 249; 2002 SCC 11			
	R v Fliss [2002] 1 SCR 535; 2002 SCC 16			
	Lavoie v Canada [2002] 1 SCR 769; 2002 SCC 23			
	R v Lamy [2002] 1 SCR 860; 2002 SCC 25			
	R v Cinous [2002] 2 SCR 3; 2002 SCC 29			
	R v Brown [2002] 2 S.C.R. 185; 2002 SCC 32			
o	R v Carlos [2002] 2 SCR 411; 2002 SCC 35			
	Gronnerud (Litigation Guardians of) v Gronnerud Estate [2002] 2 SCR 417; 2002 SCC 38			
	R v Hibbert [2002] 2 SCR 445; 2002 SCC 39			
	R v Burke [2002] 2 SCR 857; 2002 SCC 55			
	Lavallee, Rackel & Heintz v Canada (AG); White, Ottenheimer & Baker v Canada (AG); R v Fink [2002] 3 SCR 209; 2002 SCC 61			
	R v Noël [2002] 3 SCR 433; 2002 SCC 67			
	Ruby v Canada (Solicitor General) [2002] 4 SCR 3; 2002 SCC 75			
	Gosselin v Québec (AG) [2002] 4 SCR 429; 2002 SCC 84			

== 2003 ==
Louise Arbour 2003 statistics

?	Majority or Plurality	?	Concurrence	?	Other
?	Dissent	?	Concurrence/dissent	Total =	22
Written reasons= ?		Oral reasons= ?		Unanimous reasons= ?

	Case name	Issue	Co-authored by	Joined by
o	R v Feeley [2003] 1 SCR 64; 2003 SCC 7			
o	R v Knight; R v Hay [2003] 1 SCR 156; 2003 SCC 15			
	R v Arradi [2003] 1 SCR 280; 2003 SCC 23			
	Miglin v Miglin [2003] 1 SCR 303; 2003 SCC 24		Bastarache J.	
	R v Buhay [2003] 1 SCR 631; 2003 SCC 30			
	R v Owen [2003] 1 SCR 779; 2003 SCC 33			
	Wewaykum Indian Band v Canada [2003] 2 SCR 259; 2003 SCC 45			
	R v Johnson [2003] 2 SCR 357; 2003 SCC 46			
	R v Edgar [2003] 2 SCR 388; 2003 SCC 47			
	R v Smith [2003] 2 SCR 392; 2003 SCC 48			
	R v Mitchell [2003] 2 SCR 396; 2003 SCC 49			
	R v Kelly [2003] 2 SCR 400; 2003 SCC 50			
	KLB v British Columbia [2003] 2 SCR 403; 2003 SCC 51			
	EDG v Hammer [2003] 2 SCR 459; 2003 SCC 52			
	MB v British Columbia [2003] 2 SCR 477; 2003 SCC 53			
	R v SAB [2003] 2 SCR 678; 2003 SCC 60			
	Doucet-Boudreau v Nova Scotia (Minister of Education) [2003] 3 SCR 3; 2003 SCC 62		Iacobucci J.	McLachlin C.J., Gonthier and Bastarache JJ.
	Toronto (City) v Canadian Union of Public Employees, Local 79 [2003] 3 SCR 77; 2003 SCC 63			
	Ontario v Ontario Public Sector Employees Union [2003] 3 SCR 149; 2003 SCC 64			
o	Vann Niagara Ltd v Oakville (Town) [2003] 3 SCR 158; 2003 SCC 65			
	R v Malmo-Levine; R v Caine [2003] 3 SCR 571; 2003 SCC 74			
	R v Clay [2003] 3 S.C.R. 735; 2003 SCC 75			

== 2004 ==
Louise Arbour 2004 statistics

?	Majority or Plurality	?	Concurrence	?	Other
?	Dissent	?	Concurrence/dissent	Total =	6
Written reasons= ?		Oral reasons= ?		Unanimous reasons= ?

Case name	Issue	Co-authored by	Joined by
Canadian Foundation for Children, Youth and the Law v Canada (AG) [2004] 1 SCR 76; 2004 SCC 4			
Transport North American Express Inc v New Solutions Financial Corp [2004] 1 SCR 249; 2004 SCC 7			
Hamilton v Open Window Bakery Ltd [2004] 1 SCR 303; 2004 SCC 9			
Monsanto Canada Inc v Schmeiser [2004] 1 SCR 902; 2004 SCC 34			
Application under s 83.28 of the Criminal Code (Re) [2004] 2 S.C.R. 248; 2004 SCC 42		Iacobucci J.	
Vancouver Sun (Re) [2004] 2 SCR 332; 2004 SCC 43		Iacobucci J.	
