= Siemens v Manitoba (AG) =

- Supreme Court of Canada

Hearing: October 21, 2002 Judgment: January 30, 2003
- Full case name: David Albert Siemens, Eloisa Ester Siemens and Sie-Cor Properties Inc. o/a The Winkler Inn v The Attorney General of Manitoba and the Government of Manitoba
- Citations: [2003] 1 SCR 6, 2003 SCC 3
- Docket No.: 28416
- Prior history: Judgment for the Attorneys General in the Manitoba Court of Appeal.

Court membership
- Chief Justice: Beverley McLachlin; Puisne Justices: Charles Gonthier, Frank Iacobucci, John C. Major, Michel Bastarache, Ian Binnie, Louise Arbour, Louis LeBel, Marie Deschamps

Reasons given
- Unanimous reasons by: Major J.

Siemens v Manitoba (AG), [2003] 1 S.C.R. 6, 2003 SCC 3 is a leading Supreme Court of Canada decision on whether provincial plebiscite, used to determine if video lottery terminals (VLTs) should be banned from individual communities, are constitutional. The Court held that the plebiscites were a valid exercises of the province's power to legislate on matters "of a local nature" under section 92(16) of the Constitution Act, 1867, and that the plebiscite did not violate the rights of the VLT owners under sections 2(b), 7 and 15(1) of the Canadian Charter of Rights and Freedoms.

== Background ==
In 1998, the town of Winkler, Manitoba held a non-binding plebiscite in which it was decided to ban VLTs from the community. In 1999, the province of Manitoba passed the Gaming Control Local Option Act (known as the "VLT Act") which allowed municipalities to hold binding plebiscites to ban VLTs. The VLT Act contained a provision in section 16 which made the Winkler plebiscite binding which resulted in the Winkler Inn, owned by the Siemens, to shut down its VLT facilities.

The Siemens challenged the VLT Act on the ground that section 16 was ultra vires the power of the provincial government's authority as it was a matter under the federal criminal law power, and that it violated their right to freedom of expression under section 2(b) of the Charter, their right to life, liberty, and security of person under section 7 of the Charter, and their right to equality under section 15(1) of the Charter.

The motions judge rejected the claims which was upheld by the Court of Appeal.

Justice Major, writing for a unanimous Court, held that the Act was a valid exercise of the provincial law-making power and it did not violate any section of the Charter.

== Opinion of the court ==
Major first considered the issue of whether section 16 was validly enacted. He examined the pith and substance of both the legislation and the impugned provision. The purpose of section 16 of the Act was to prohibit VLTs in the town of Winkler and to cancel all existing "siteholder agreements" for those with VLTs in their establishment. Based on the legislative debates, the section was used to give effect to plebiscite that had already been held. The purpose of the Act as a whole was "to allow municipalities to express, by binding plebiscite, whether they wish VLTs to be permitted or prohibited within their communities."

The regulation of gaming and the allowance of local input both fall under section 92 of the Constitution Act, 1867. Section 16, which cancels "siteholder agreements" concerns property and civil rights which is a provincial power under section 92(13) of the Constitution Act, 1867. The Act as a whole gives power to the community to regulate VLTs consequently is considered a matter of a local nature under section 92(16).

Major rejected the argument that the law was a "colourable" attempt to enact criminal law. The Act did not contain the penal consequences required for valid criminal law nor was there a criminal law purpose for the Act. The moral aspect to the law was only incidental to the regulatory scheme.

Major rejected all of the Charter arguments. First, he dismissed the section 2 argument because although voting is a form of expression that is protected under the Charter it does not however include voting in a referendum as it was a creation of a statute. Second, he dismissed the section 7 argument as it has been well established that economic interests are not protected by the Charter and are not found within section 7. Lastly, he rejected the section 15 argument as the claimants failed to show that residence in a particular community or town is an "analogous ground" for discrimination.

== See also ==
- List of Supreme Court of Canada cases (McLachlin Court)
