= R v Henry =

- Supreme Court of Canada

Hearing: April 23, 2004, reheard January 12, 2005 Judgment: December 15, 2005
- Full case name: Her Majesty The Queen v David Brock Henry and Her Majesty The Queen v Barry Wayne Riley
- Citations: [1986] 1 S.C.R. 103; 2005 SCC 76; 376 AR 1; 260 DLR (4th) 411; [2006] 4 WWR 605; 202 CCC (3d) 449; 33 CR (6th) 215; 136 CRR (2d) 121; 49 BCLR (4th) 1
- Prior history: Judgment for the Crown by a majority of the Court of Appeal for British Columbia
- Ruling: Appeal dismissed.

Holding
- The Crown may use the accused's previous voluntarily given testimony to incriminate or impeach credibility in a retrial if the accused again chooses to testify at said retrial.

Court membership
- Chief Justice: Beverley McLachlin; Puisne Justices: John C. Major, Michel Bastarache, Ian Binnie, Louis LeBel, Marie Deschamps, Morris Fish, Rosalie Abella, Louise Charron

Reasons given
- Majority: Binnie J. (paras. 1-61), joined by McLachlin C.J. and Major, Bastarache, LeBel, Deschamps, Fish, Abella and Charron JJ.

R v Henry [2005] 3 S.C.R. 609 is a leading Supreme Court of Canada case on the protection against self-incrimination in section 13 of the Canadian Charter of Rights and Freedoms. The court ruled that the Crown may use the accused's previous voluntarily given testimony to incriminate or impeach credibility in a retrial if the accused again chooses to testify at said retrial. The court further held that no distinction should be drawn between the use of such evidence to incriminate the accused directly or to impeach their credibility. The Court partially restored this distinction in R. v. Nedelcu, 2012 SCC 59.

== Background ==
David Henry and Barry Riley had previously been convicted of the first degree murder of Timothy Langmead, who was tied to a chair and had duct tape wound around his mouth in relation to a dispute over a drug-related debt. Henry and Riley's murder convictions were overturned by the British Columbia Court of Appeal and the matter sent back for re-trial.

Henry and Riley had testified in their own defence at the first trial and did so again at the second, but told a different story in the second trial. They were convicted again after the Crown cross-examined them on the inconsistent statements from the first trial. A majority of the Court of Appeal upheld their conviction, rejecting their argument that s. 13 ought to have prevented their previously given testimony from being revealed to the jury despite that they had voluntarily testified in their own defence on both occasions. Hall J.A. dissented, finding that the testimony on which the Crown had cross-examined the appellants was directly incriminating, and that previous Supreme Court decisions limited the use of such testimony to impeaching the accused's credibility.

Henry and Riley appealed to the Supreme Court as of right as a result of the decision being split. The only live issue at the Supreme Court was the scope of R. v. Noël and R. v. Allen, specifically, whether s. 13 was available to an accused who chose to testify at his or her retrial.

== Court's reasons ==
Writing for the court, Binnie J. found that the purpose of s. 13 was to "protect individuals from being indirectly compelled to incriminate themselves" (para 22). In tandem with section 5 of the Canada Evidence Act, it accomplished this by establishing a quid pro quo system, in which witnesses can be compelled to testify on potentially incriminating matters in return for the State's promise that such compelled evidence cannot be used against them. By preventing the subsequent use of this testimony, such a system encourages the witness to provide full and frank testimony.

Based on this rationale, the court overruled its earlier decision in R. v. Mannion, holding that s. 13 was only available to an accused who had testified compulsorily in the earlier proceeding, whether a retrial of the same matter or a different trial. The Court drew a distinction between retrial situations where the accused had previously testified voluntarily (and should not be entitled to full immunity) and instances where the accused had been compelled to testify as a non-accused witness in a different trial (and should thus receive full immunity).

Binnie J. further wrote that drawing a distinction between the use of previously given testimony to impeach the accused's credibility or to incriminate was unworkable in practice. On that basis, he concluded that s. 13 applies to any use of evidence given under compulsion, including for the ostensible purpose of challenging the accused's credibility.

As a result of its holding on the availability of s. 13 to an accused testifying on retrial, the court found that, seeing Henry and Riley were voluntary witnesses both at the first trial and at the retrial, their testimony at the first trial had not been improperly introduced at the retrial, dismissing the appeals and letting their convictions stand.

== Aftermath ==
The status of court's decision not to distinguish between evidence used to incriminate or impeach is unclear following R. v. Nedelcu, 2012 SCC 59, where a majority of the Supreme Court found that s. 13 was not engaged when an accused's testimony obtained under compulsion in a related civil proceeding was used to convict him in the criminal trial by attacking his credibility. Writing for the dissent, LeBel J. noted that the approach adopted by the majority overruled or at least altered Henry on that point.
