= R v Godoy =

Judgement of the Supreme Court of Canada

- Supreme Court of Canada

Hearing: December 2, 1998 Judgment: December 2, 1998
- Full case name: Vincent Godoy v The Attorney General of Canada
- Citations: 1999 CanLII 709 (SCC), [1999] 1 SCR 311
- Docket No.: 26078

Court membership
- Chief Justice: Antonio Lamer; Puisne Justices: Claire L'Heureux-Dubé, Charles Gonthier, Peter Cory, Beverley McLachlin, Frank Iacobucci, John C. Major, Michel Bastarache, Ian Binnie

Reasons given
- Unanimous reasons by: Lamer C.J.

R v Godoy, [1999] 1 S.C.R. 311 is a leading Supreme Court of Canada decision regarding the scope of police powers to enter into private dwellings without a warrant in order to protect lives. The Court affirmed that police have a common law duty to protect lives and that an anonymous 911 call is sufficient to invoke that duty, consequently, the police were justified in forcibly entering into the private home.

== Background ==
On June 1, 1992, a 911 operator received an "unknown trouble" call where the phone was disconnected before the operator heard any voice. The call was traced to Vincent Godoy's house and four police officers were dispatched to his house. The policy of the police is to treat "unknown trouble" calls as high priority. The officers talked with Godoy who told them that there was no problem. One officer asked if they could come inside. Godoy tried to close the door but the officer put his foot in the door and they all entered.

The officers found a battered woman sobbing. They arrested Godoy for assault. In the Ontario Court of Appeal, the court found that the police acted validly based on their common law duty to prevent serious injury and protect lives. The Supreme Court upheld the Court of Appeal's decision.

== Opinion of the Court ==
Chief Justice Lamer, for the Court, found that police possessed a general duty to protect lives even outside of criminal situations. Where there are reasonable and probable grounds the police are allowed entering a private dwelling in order to fulfill their duty. Here, the police could not have had reasonable and probable grounds based solely on the phone call. However, once they investigated further they were able to establish a reasonable and probable ground which allowed them to enter.
