= Canada (House of Commons) v Vaid =

- Supreme Court of Canada

Hearing: October 13, 2004 Judgment: May 20, 2005
- Full case name: House of Commons and the Honourable Gilbert Parent v. Satnam Vaid and Canadian Human Rights Commission
- Citations: 2005 SCC 30, [2005] 1 S.C.R. 667
- Docket No.: 29564
- Prior history: APPEAL from a judgment of the Federal Court of Appeal (Létourneau, Linden and Rothstein JJ.A.), 2002 FCA 473, upholding a decision of Tremblay‑Lamer J., 2001 FCT 1332, dismissing an application for judicial review of a decision from the Canadian Human Rights Tribunal, 2001 CanLII 25861 (CHRT)
- Ruling: Appeal allowed

Holding
- The assembly or member seeking immunity under parliamentary privilege must show that the sphere of activity for which privilege is claimed is so closely and directly connected with the fulfilment by the assembly or its members of their functions as a legislative and deliberative body, including the assembly's work in holding the government to account, that outside interference would undermine the level of autonomy required to enable the assembly and its members to do their legislative work with dignity and efficiency.

Court membership
- Chief Justice: Beverley McLachlin; Puisne Justices: John C. Major, Michel Bastarache, Ian Binnie, Louis LeBel, Marie Deschamps, Morris Fish, Rosalie Abella, Louise Charron

Reasons given
- Unanimous reasons by: Binnie

Canada (House of Commons) v Vaid, [2005] 1 S.C.R. 667, 2005 SCC 30 is the leading decision of the Supreme Court of Canada on parliamentary privilege. The court developed a test for determining when a claim of parliamentary privilege can protect a legislative body or its members from legal scrutiny. Besides the parties to the case (the House of Commons of Canada, Member of Parliament Gilbert Parent, Satnam Vaid, and the Canadian Human Rights Commission), the court heard from the following interveners: the Attorney General of Canada, Senator Serge Joyal, Senator Mobina Jaffer, the Canadian Association of Professional Employees, the Communications, Energy and Paperworkers Union of Canada, and the Speaker of the Legislative Assembly of Ontario.

== Background ==
Satnam Vaid was a chauffeur for the various Speakers of the House of Commons from 1984 to 1994. On January 11, 1995, Vaid was dismissed because he allegedly refused to accept the new duties under a revised job description.

Vaid filed a grievance for his termination, and on July 25, 1995, the Board of Adjudication ruled in Vaid's favour and ordered that he be allowed to resume his employment as chauffeur. During the adjudication, Vaid claimed racial discrimination, which the board said was not made out.

On August 17, 1995, Vaid returned to work, at which time he was told that the chauffeur's position had been changed to a bilingual one, and Vaid was sent for French language training.

On April 8, 1997, Vaid requested that he be allowed to return to work. On May 12, 1997, the Speaker's office, under then Speaker, Gilbert Parent, replied that due to reorganization, Vaid's position was being made surplus effective May 29, 1997.

=== Judicial history ===
On July 10, 1997, Vaid complained to the Canadian Human Rights Commission, claiming that the Speaker and the House of Commons discriminated against him due to race, colour, and national or ethnic origin. Vaid also claimed workplace harassment.

The complaints were referred to the Canadian Human Rights Tribunal. Parent and the House of Commons challenged the Tribunal's jurisdiction to hear the complaint due to parliamentary privilege.

Parent and the House of Commons sought judicial review at the Federal Court, Trial Division, which was refused. This decision was upheld by the Federal Court of Appeal.

== Reasons of the court ==
A unanimous decision of the court was written by Justice Ian Binnie.

The court found that the first step of determining whether parliamentary privilege exists at the federal level in a particular area is to ascertain whether the existence and scope of the claimed privilege have been authoritatively established in relation the Parliament of Canada or to the House of Commons at Westminster.

If the existence and scope of the claimed privilege has not been authoritatively established, then it must be tested against the doctrine of necessity. That is, the assembly or member seeking its immunity must show that the sphere of activity for which privilege is claimed is so closely and directly connected with the fulfillment by the assembly or its members of their functions as a legislative and deliberative body, including the assembly's work in holding the government to account, that outside interference would undermine the level of autonomy required to enable the assembly and its members to do their work with dignity and efficiency.

The court went on to find that parliamentary privilege was not so broad as to protect employment matters. Justice Binnie wrote:

I have no doubt that privilege attaches to the House's relations with some of its employees, but the appellants have insisted on the broadest possible coverage without leading any evidence to justify such a sweeping immunity, or a lesser immunity, or indeed any evidence of necessity at all. ... The appellants having failed to establish the privilege in the broad and all-inclusive terms asserted, the respondents are entitled to have the appeal disposed of according to the ordinary employment and human rights law that Parliament has enacted with respect to employees within federal legislative jurisdiction.

However, unrelated to the parliamentary privilege issue, the court found that the Canadian Human Rights Act did not apply to parliamentary employees, as their labour issues were under the exclusive jurisdiction of the Parliamentary Employment and Staff Relations Act. Therefore, the Canadian Human Rights Tribunal did not have jurisdiction on the matter, and the appeal was allowed.

== See also ==
- List of Supreme Court of Canada cases (McLachlin Court)
