= Mugesera v Canada (Minister of Citizenship and Immigration) =

- Supreme Court of Canada

Hearing: 8 December 2004 Judgment: 28 June 2005
- Full case name: Minister of Citizenship and Immigration v Léon Mugesera, Gemma Uwamariya, Irenée Rutema, Yves Rusi, Carmen Nono, Mireille Urumuri and Marie‑Grâce Hoho
- Citations: 2005 SCC 40
- Docket No.: 30025
- Prior history: APPEAL from Mugesera v. Canada (Minister of Citizenship and Immigration), 2003 FCA 325 (8 September 2003), setting aside Mugesera v. Canada (Minister of Citizenship and Immigration), 2001 FCT 460 (10 May 2001)
- Ruling: Appeal allowed

Court membership
- Chief Justice: Beverley McLachlin; Puisne Justices: John C. Major, Michel Bastarache, Ian Binnie, Louis LeBel, Marie Deschamps, Morris Fish, Rosalie Abella, Louise Charron

Reasons given
- Unanimous reasons by: The Court
- Abella J took no part in the consideration or decision of the case.

Mugesera v Canada (Minister of Citizenship and Immigration), [2005] 2 S.C.R. 100, is a leading Supreme Court of Canada decision. The Court upheld the deportation order for Léon Mugesera, a politician from Rwanda, on the grounds of inciting hatred and for suspicion of crimes against humanity for his alleged role in the Rwandan genocide.

== Cases Cited ==
Applied: R. v. Dionne (1987), 38 C.C.C. (3d) 171; Prosecutor v. Akayesu, 9 IHRR 608 (1998), aff’d Case No. ICTR‑96‑4‑A, 1 June 2001; R. v. Keegstra, [1990] 3 S.C.R. 697; Prosecutor v. Ruggiu, 39 ILM 1338 (2000); Prosecutor v. Kunarac, Kovac and Vukovic, ICTY, Case Nos. IT‑96‑23‑T‑II & IT‑96‑23/1‑T‑II, 22 February 2001, aff’d Case Nos. IT‑96‑23‑A & IT‑96‑23/1‑A, 12 June 2002; Prosecutor v. Blaskic, 122 ILR 1 (2000); overruled: R. v. Finta, [1994] 1 S.C.R. 701; referred to: Dr. Q v. College of Physicians and Surgeons of British Columbia, [2003] 1 S.C.R. 226, 2003 SCC 19; Aguebor v. Minister of Employment and Immigration (1993), 160 N.R. 315; R. v. Ford (2000), 145 C.C.C. (3d) 336; R. v. Sharpe, [2001] 1 S.C.R. 45, 2001 SCC 2; Baker v. Canada (Minister of Citizenship and Immigration), [1999] 2 S.C.R. 817; Prosecutor v. Nahimana, Barayagwiza and Ngeze, Case No. ICTR‑99‑52‑T‑I, 3 December 2003; Canadian Jewish Congress v. North Shore Free Press Ltd. (No. 7) (1997), 30 C.H.R.R. D/5; R. v. Buzzanga and Durocher (1979), 49 C.C.C. (2d) 369; Prud’homme v. Prud’homme, [2002] 4 S.C.R. 663, 2002 SCC 85; Société St‑Jean‑Baptiste de Montréal v. Hervieux‑Payette, [2002] R.J.Q. 1669; Sivakumar v. Canada (Minister of Employment and Immigration), [1994] 1 F.C. 433; Chiau v. Canada (Minister of Citizenship and Immigration), [2001] 2 F.C. 297; Sabour v. Canada (Minister of Citizenship & Immigration) (2000), 9 Imm. L.R. (3d) 61; Moreno v. Canada (Minister of Employment and Immigration), [1994] 1 F.C. 298; Prosecutor v. Rutaganda, Case No. ICTR‑96‑3‑T‑I, 6 December 1999; Prosecutor v. Kordic and Cerkez, ICTY, Case No. IT‑95‑14/2‑T‑III, 26 February 2001; Prosecutor v. Kupreskic, ICTY, Case No. IT‑95‑16‑T‑II, 14 January 2000; Prosecutor v. Kayishema, Case No. ICTR‑95‑1‑T‑II, 21 May 1999; Prosecutor v. Mrksic, Radic and Sljivancanin, 108 ILR 53 (1996); Reservations to the Convention on the Prevention and Punishment of the Crime of Genocide, I.C.J. Reports 1951, p. 15; Prosecutor v. Tadic, 112 ILR 1 (1997), aff’d in part 124 ILR 61 (1999).

== See also ==
- List of Supreme Court of Canada cases (McLachlin Court)
