= Whiten v Pilot Insurance Co =

- Supreme Court of Canada

Hearing: December 14, 2000 Judgment: February 22, 2002
- Full case name: Daphne Whiten v Pilot Insurance Company and The Insurance Council of Canada and the Ontario Trial Lawyers Association
- Citations: 2002 SCC 18, [2002] 1 S.C.R. 595
- Docket No.: 27229
- Ruling: Appeal allowed, and cross-appeal dismissed

Court membership
- Chief Justice: Beverley McLachlin; Puisne Justices: Claire L'Heureux-Dubé, Charles Gonthier, Frank Iacobucci, John C. Major, Michel Bastarache, Ian Binnie, Louise Arbour, Louis LeBel

Reasons given
- Majority: Binnie, with McLachlin C.J. and L'Heureux‑Dubé, Gonthier, Major and Arbour concurring
- Dissent: LeBel

Whiten v Pilot Insurance Co, 2002 SCC 18, [2002] 1 S.C.R. 595 is a leading Supreme Court of Canada decision on the availability of punitive damages in contract. The case related to the oppressive conduct of an insurance company in dealing with the policyholders' claim following a fire. According to the majority, "[t]his was an exceptional case that justified an exceptional remedy."

== Background ==
On January 18, 1994, the Whitens discovered a fire in their home in Haliburton County, Ontario. The family fled their home in the night wearing only their pajamas, and one member of the family suffered serious frostbite to his feet. The fire destroyed the Whiten's home, possessions, and resulted in the deaths of their three cats. The family rented a small cottage nearby and received a single payment of $5,000 from the Pilot Insurance Company for living expenses, and subsequently cut off support for the family.

The local fire chief concluded the fire was accidental and concluded it started from a malfunctioning kerosene heater on the porch of the home. As firefighters on scene did not find evidence of arson, the Fire Marshall's office was not called to investigate. The independent insurance adjustor retained by Pilot Insurance investigated the fire and concluded based on the physical evidence and family's conduct that the fire was accidental.

Pilot Insurance found that the family was behind on mortgage payments and that the Whiten's were arranging refinancing. The independent adjuster was also made aware of the family's financial difficulties during the investigation. Pilot Insurance refused to accept the findings of the independent adjustor and later rejected similar advice from the Insurance Crime Prevention Bureau that there was little basis to deny the claim for fraud. After requesting the independent adjuster continue to investigate new avenues for arson, which they were unable to find any evidence, Pilot Insurance replaced the adjuster.

Pilot had also retained an engineering expert that initially concluded the fire was accidental, however after meeting with Pilots attorney the engineer reclassified the fire as "suspicious, possibly incendiary".

=== Ontario Court of Justice decision ===
In the January 25, 1996, a jury in the Ontario Court of Justice awarded Whiten $1,287,300, including $1 million for punitive damages, as well as interest on the awarded compensatory damages. The punitive damages awarded by the jury exceeded the $125,000 claimed by Whiten. In his written decision, Justice Theodore Matlow noted the jury's assessment of punitive damages was "very high and perhaps without precedent" but described the award as "entirely reasonable in light of the evidence".

=== Ontario Court of Appeal decision ===
Pilot Insurance appealed the award of $1 million in punitive damages as the company did not commit "an independent actionable wrong" and because its actions was not reprehensible enough to warrant the damages. Instead Pilot requested the court remove the punitive damages, or limit the damages to $15,000 to $25,000. Furthermore, Pilot conceded that despite the position taken at the lower court, the evidence unequivocally showed that the Whiten's fire was accidental.

On February 2, 1999, the majority for the Ontario Court of Appeal written by Justice George Finlayson and concurred by Justice Marvin Catzman, agreed Pilot's reprehensible conduct justified the award of punitive damages, however, Finlayson found the $1 million award excessive.

Dissenting in part, Justice John I. Laskin found Pilot's behaviour was reprehensible and the $1 million punitive damage award was justified.

== Reasons of the court ==
The majority decision was written by Justice Binnie; Justice LeBel dissented.

=== Binnie ===
Writing for the majority of eight justices, Justice Binnie outlined the contractual duty of an insurer to deal with policyholders in good faith, the breach of which would make the insurer liable for punitive damages. He held that the defendant insurance company had breached its contractual duty through its high-handed and reprehensible treatment of the plaintiff insureds. Justice Binnie also restored the unprecedented $1 million jury award, which the a majority at the Ontario Court of Appeal had reduced to $100,000.

Justice Binnie accepted the standard for imposing punitive damages articulated in Hill v Church of Scientology of Toronto: "Punitive damages are awarded against a defendant in exceptional cases for 'malicious, oppressive and high-handed' misconduct that 'offends the court's sense of decency'..." Binnie set out the following principles to guide trial judges in their charges to juries:

(1) Punitive damages are very much the exception rather than the rule, (2) imposed only if there has been high-handed, malicious, arbitrary or highly reprehensible misconduct that departs to a marked degree from ordinary standards of decent behaviour. (3) Where they are awarded, punitive damages should be assessed in an amount reasonably proportionate to such factors as the harm caused, the degree of the misconduct, the relative vulnerability of the plaintiff and any advantage or profit gained by the defendant, (4) having regard to any other fines or penalties suffered by the defendant for the misconduct in question. (5) Punitive damages are generally given only where the misconduct would otherwise be unpunished or where other penalties are or are likely to be inadequate to achieve the objectives of retribution, deterrence and denunciation. (6) Their purpose is not to compensate the plaintiff, but (7) to give a defendant his or her just desert (retribution), to deter the defendant and others from similar misconduct in the future (deterrence), and to mark the community's collective condemnation (denunciation) of what has happened. (8) Punitive damages are awarded only where compensatory damages, which to some extent are punitive, are insufficient to accomplish these objectives, and (9) they are given in an amount that is no greater than necessary to rationally accomplish their purpose. (10) While normally the state would be the recipient of any fine or penalty for misconduct, the plaintiff will keep punitive damages as a "windfall" in addition to compensatory damages. (11) Judges and juries in our system have usually found that moderate awards of punitive damages, which inevitably carry a stigma in the broader community, are generally sufficient.

=== LeBel ===
In dissent, Justice LeBel accepted the appropriateness of a punitive damage award but was critical of the award's magnitude and skeptical of the remedy's deterrence objective on the facts of the case: there was no evidence of endemic high-handed behaviour, either by the defendant insurer toward its policyholders, or in the Canadian insurance industry generally. In any event, he opined, regulatory and penal mechanisms would be more appropriate for any industry-wide concerns, than less predictable damage awards.

Justice LeBel agreed generally with the majority's description of principles governing punitive damages and, in particular, the importance of rationality and proportionality in shaping any such award. However, the original jury award in this case failed the rationality test because of its sole purpose of punishing the insurer's bad faith. It also failed the proportionality test because of the gulf between the quantum of the award and the loss suffered by the plaintiffs. The reduced award at the Court of Appeal, according to Lebel J., satisfied both of these tests, "impos[ing] significant punishment for the bad faith of Pilot without upsetting the proper balance between the compensatory and punitive functions of tort law." This award was sufficient and "consistent with the nature and purpose of punitive damages in the law of torts". The majority result, on the other hand, was inappropriate in the context of tort law:

Tort law fulfills diverse functions. While deterrence and denunciation both still play a role, since it broke away from criminal law in the Middle Ages, in its core function, tort law has been compensatory or corrective...The purpose of this part of our legal system remains to make good the loss suffered, no less, no more...The award of punitive damages in discussion here leads us far away from this principle. It tends to turn tort law upside down. It transmogrifies what should have remained an incident of a contracts case into the central issue of the dispute. The main purpose of the action becomes the search for punishment, not compensation.

== Significance of the decision ==
Justice Binnie pointed to this decision among all of his Supreme Court opinions as giving him "particular satisfaction":

There was a lawyer who I believe must have been acting pro bono, who carried it all the way to the Supreme Court. He had gotten a jury so incensed at the insurance company that they awarded a million dollars in punitive damages. In the end, we upheld the outcome and it seemed to me that on a human scale, a massive injustice had been corrected and a very powerful message sent to the insurance industry. Occasionally, you feel that you have really made a difference.

== See also ==
- List of Supreme Court of Canada cases (McLachlin Court)
