= R v Asante-Mensah =

Supreme Court of Canada decision

- Supreme Court of Canada

Hearing: November 7, 2002 Judgment: July 11, 2003
- Full case name: Daniel Asante-Mensah v. Her Majesty The Queen
- Citations: 2003 SCC 38, [2003] 2 S.C.R. 3
- Docket No.: 28867
- Prior history: Judgment for the Crown in the Court of Appeal for Ontario.
- Ruling: Appeal dismissed.

Holding
- A citizen may use reasonable force necessary to undertake a citizen's arrest and maintain it.

Court membership
- Chief Justice: Beverley McLachlin; Puisne Justices: Charles Gonthier, Frank Iacobucci, John C. Major, Michel Bastarache, Ian Binnie, Louise Arbour, Louis LeBel, Marie Deschamps

Reasons given
- Unanimous reasons by: Binnie J.

R v Asante-Mensah, [2003] 2 S.C.R. 3, 2003 SCC 38, is a leading Supreme Court of Canada decision where the Court affirmed the limits to which private citizens may undertake an arrest, as well as the limits of private individuals in the use of force to protect property. This case holds particular importance as the prevalence of private security has become increasingly popular across Canada.

== Background ==
Daniel Asante-Mensah was a "scooper," a type of Toronto taxi driver that picks up fares from the Pearson International Airport without the proper permit authorized under the Ontario Trespass to Property Act. He collected passengers from the airport and, on numerous occasions, received notice under section 3 of the Act that he was prohibited from entering onto airport property on penalty of trespass.

To control the problem of "scoopers," the airport authorities instructed the airport inspectors to undertake citizen's arrest under section 9 of the Act. One of the inspectors attempted to arrest Asante-Mensah by touching his shoulder and informing him that he was under arrest and would be detained until the police arrived. Asante-Mensah attempted to get into his car but was blocked by the inspector. However, Asante-Mensah responded by shoving the car door into the inspector, which gave him room to get into his car and he drove off.

At trial, the judge held that there was no arrest as the inspector was not authorized to use "reasonable force." The verdict was overturned on appeal. Asante-Mensah tried to challenge the law under section 7 and section 9 of the Charter but it was rejected and was not appealed on.

== Opinion of the Court ==
The Supreme Court, in a unanimous decision, held that the inspector had properly arrested Asante-Mensah. In reference to R. v. Whitfield, the Court held that a citizen's arrest at common law allows for a use of "reasonable force". This includes reasonable force necessary to undertake the arrest and maintain it.

== See also ==
- List of Supreme Court of Canada cases (McLachlin Court)
