= Paul v British Columbia (Forest Appeals Commission) =

- Supreme Court of Canada

Hearing: June 11, 2003 Judgment: October 3, 2003
- Citations: {{{citations}}}

Holding
- A provincial administrative actor may adjudicate matters within federal legislative competence

Court membership
- Chief Justice: Beverley McLachlin; Puisne Justices: Frank Iacobucci, John C. Major, Michel Bastarache, Ian Binnie, Louise Arbour, Louis LeBel, Marie Deschamps, Morris Fish

Reasons given
- Majority: Bastarache J.

Paul v British Columbia (Forest Appeals Commission), 2003 SCC 55, is a leading Supreme Court of Canada decision in administrative law and aboriginal law. The case stands for the proposition that a provincial administrative actor granted the power to determine questions of law may adjudicate matters within federal legislative competence, including s. 35 aboriginal rights matters.

== Facts ==
The B.C. Ministry of Forestry seized four logs in the possession of Paul, a registered Indian, who planned to use the wood to build a deck on his home. Paul asserted that he had an aboriginal right to cut timber for house modification and, therefore, the relevant provision of the Forest Practices Code did not apply to him. Timothy P. Leadem, Q.C., and Kathryn Kickbush, represented the appellants, M. Hugh G. Braker, Q.C., and Robert C. Freedman represented the respondent. Murray Rankin and Mark G. Underhill represented the intervener, the Forest Appeals Commission.

== Judicial History ==
The District Manager agreed that Paul had contravened section 96 of the Forest Practices Code. Paul appealed to the Administrative Review Panel, which concurred with the District Manager. Paul then appealed to the Forest Appeals Commission. When the Forest Appeals Commission found that it possessed the jurisdiction to assess Paul's aboriginal rights claim, Paul moved for an order of certiorari under the BC Judicial Review Procedure Act quashing this preliminary decision of the commission. Paul argued that only the courts should be able to hear and assess his aboriginal rights claim. The Supreme Court of British Columbia ruled that it was within the power of the Forest Appeals Commission to rule on Paul's aboriginal rights claim. Paul then appealed to the British Columbia Court of Appeal. The Court ruled that the BC Legislature was unable to give the commission the power to rule on Paul's aboriginal rights claim by reason of s. 91(24) of the Constitution Act, 1867, which gives the federal Parliament exclusive jurisdiction to regulate with respect to "Indians, and Land reserved for the Indians." The case was then appealed to the Supreme Court of Canada.

== Reasons of the court ==
=== Can the Province empower the Commission to hear and determine Section 35 questions? ===
Paul argued that the ss. 130 to 141 of the BC Forest Practices Code are ultra vires because they trench upon the core of Indianness, as protected by s. 91(24) of the Constitution Act, 1867. Specifically, counsel for Paul argued that these sections of the act, which provide that the Commission may rule on matters of law, including aboriginal rights (as argued subsequently), are ultra vires by operation of interjurisdictional immunity. This doctrine holds that "where the general language of a provincial statute can be read to trench upon exclusive federal power in its application specific factual contexts, the statute must be read down so as not to apply to those situations". The court considered this argument, but rejected it. The reason why they rejected the argument in this case was that the statute in question merely allowed the provincial Commission to take cognizances of existing constitutional rights, not to alter or supplant those rights. The court held that a provincial board may adjudicate matters within federal legislative competence. In coming to this conclusion the court turned to a long line of authorities, including Ontario (Attorney General) v. Pembina Exploration Canada Ltd., which have held that provincially constituted courts can adjudicate matters of exclusive federal jurisdiction, such as Admiralty law.

=== Did the Province empower the Commission to hear and determine Section 35 questions? ===
The court finds that any tribunal that has the power to rule on matters of law implicitly has the power to rule on Constitutional matters, including s. 35 aboriginal rights matters. The court canvasses arguments that aboriginal rights are somehow different from other constitutional rights, either in their complexity, state of flux, or precedential import, but rejected all such proposals as not providing a workable principled distinction between areas that are generally agreed to be within the competence of inferior tribunals (e.g. the factual determination that a person is an Indian) and those that would putatively not be within the tribunal's jurisdiction.

== See also ==
- List of Supreme Court of Canada cases
