= Mitchell v MNR =

- Supreme Court of Canada

Hearing: 16 June 2000 Judgment: May 24, 2001
- Full case name: Minister of National Revenue v Grand Chief Michael Mitchell also known as Kanentakeron
- Citations: 2001 SCC 33
- Docket No.: 27066
- Prior history: APPEAL from Mitchell v. M.N.R., 1998 CanLII 9104 (2 November 1998), affirming in part Mitchell v. Canada (Minister of National Revenue), 1997 CanLII 5266 (27 June 1997)
- Ruling: Appeal allowed

Court membership
- Chief Justice: Beverley McLachlin; Puisne Justices: Claire L'Heureux-Dubé, Charles Gonthier, Frank Iacobucci, John C. Major, Michel Bastarache, Ian Binnie, Louise Arbour, Louis LeBel

Reasons given
- Majority: McLachlin CJ, joined by Gonthier, Iacobucci, Arbour and LeBel JJ
- Concurrence: Binnie J, joined by Major J
- L'Heureux-Dubé and Bastarache JJ took no part in the consideration or decision of the case.

Mitchell v MNR [2001] 1 S.C.R. 911, 2001 SCC 331 is a leading Supreme Court of Canada decision on aboriginal rights under section 35(1) of the Constitution Act, 1982. The court held that Mitchell's claim to an aboriginal right to import goods across the Canada–US border was invalid as he was unable to present enough evidence showing that the importation was an integral part of the band's distinctive culture.

In 1988, Grand Chief Michael Mitchell, a Mohawk of Akwesasne, attempted to bring goods from the US into Canada. At the border he declared everything that he had purchased in the US but refused to pay any duty on it, claiming that he had an aboriginal right to bring goods across the border.

At trial, the Federal Court agreed with Mitchell and held that there was an aboriginal right to import goods. The decision was upheld by the Federal Court of Appeal.

The Supreme Court overturned the decision, and held that Mitchell was required to pay duty for all of the goods he imported.

== See also ==
- List of Supreme Court of Canada cases (McLachlin Court)
- The Canadian Crown and First Nations, Inuit and Métis
- Canadian Aboriginal case law
- Numbered Treaties
- Indian Act
- Section Thirty-five of the Constitution Act, 1982
- Indian Health Transfer Policy (Canada)
