= R v Cook =

- Supreme Court of Canada

Hearing: 17 June 1998 Judgment: 1 October 1998
- Full case name: Deltonia R Cook v Her Majesty The Queen
- Citations: [1998] 2 SCR 597
- Docket No.: 25852
- Prior history: APPEAL from R v Cook, 1996 CanLII 2438 (18 December 1996)
- Ruling: Appeal allowed

Court membership
- Chief Justice: Antonio Lamer; Puisne Justices: Claire L'Heureux-Dubé, Charles Gonthier, Peter Cory, Beverley McLachlin, Frank Iacobucci, John C. Major, Michel Bastarache, Ian Binnie

Reasons given
- Majority: Cory and Iacobucci JJ, joined by Lamer CJ and Major and Binnie JJ
- Concurrence: Bastarache J, joined by Gonthier J
- Dissent: L'Heureux-Dubé J, joined by McLachlin J

R v Cook, [1998] 2 SCR 597, is a leading Charter decision of the Supreme Court of Canada. The Court held that Canadian police located in the United States were still subject to the Charter when interrogating a suspect for a murder in Canada.

== Background ==
Deltonia Cook was arrested by US police in Louisiana at the request of the Royal Canadian Mounted Police. Initially upon arrest he was read his Miranda rights by the US police officers. He requested access to a lawyer but the police never followed through with the request. When the Canadian police arrived they questioned him but it was not until 20 minutes into the interrogation that they informed him of his right to retain and instruct counsel under section 10(b) of the Charter.

At trial the Crown sought to admit as evidence parts of the statements Cook made in the interrogation. Cook challenged the evidence as a violation of his rights under section 10(b).

== Reasons of the Court ==
The court held that acts of any Canadian police force performing duties outside of Canada are subject to the Charter.

In this particular case, the court found that there was a violation of the accused's right to counsel and right to silence. These violations were flagrant and the evidence would not have been otherwise been discovered thus rendering the trial unfair. Consequently, the evidence of Mr. Cook's statement was excluded.

Justices L'Heureux-Dubé and McLachlin dissented, stating that the Charter did not apply, and that the police were working as part of an American investigation and were acting under their authority.
