= Miglin v Miglin =

- Supreme Court of Canada

Hearing: October 29, 2002 Judgment: April 17, 2003
- Full case name: Eric Juri Miglin v Linda Susan Miglin
- Citations: [2003] 1 S.C.R. 303, 2003 SCC 24
- Ruling: Appeal allowed

Court membership
- Chief Justice: Beverley McLachlin; Puisne Justices: Charles Gonthier, Frank Iacobucci, John C. Major, Michel Bastarache, Ian Binnie, Louise Arbour, Louis LeBel, Marie Deschamps

Reasons given
- Majority: Bastarache and Arbour JJ., joined by McLachlin C.J. and Gonthier, Iacobucci, Major, and Binnie JJ.
- Dissent: LeBel J., joined by Deschamps J.

Miglin v Miglin, [2003] 1 S.C.R. 303, 2003 SCC 24, is the leading case decided by the Supreme Court of Canada on the use of separation agreements. The Court established a two-stage test to determine whether a separation agreement can be relied upon.

Prior to the Miglin decision, the leading cases on separation agreements was the Pelech Trilogy. In those cases, it was held that a separation agreement is binding and a party can only apply for spousal support where there has been a radical and unforeseeable change in circumstances which has a causal connection to the marriage. The Miglin decision rejected this strict test.

== Facts ==
The parties separated and spent more than 12 months negotiating a separation agreement. As part of the separation agreement, the parties agreed to a complete release of spousal support; that is, no spousal support would be payable in the future for any reason. At the same time, the parties entered into a consulting agreement in which the husband paid the wife $15,000 per annum, renewable after five years if both parties agreed. Six months before the expiration of the first five-year term of the consulting agreement, the wife applied to court for spousal support, asking the court to find the spousal support release invalid.

== Opinion of the Court ==
Justices Bastarache and Arbour, writing for the majority, allowed the appeal, upholding the spousal support release in the separation agreement.

In their analysis they set out the test for re-opening a domestic contract of any sort. The test has two steps. First, the court considers the circumstances in which the initial agreement was made: whether the agreement was negotiated in an unimpeachable fashion and whether the agreement conformed with the objectives of the Divorce Act. Second, the court must consider the current circumstances: whether the agreement still reflects the intentions of the parties and whether there has been significant change in circumstances such that it was reasonably unforeseeable at the time of formation such that the results of the agreement no longer meet the objectives of the Divorce Act.

== Significance ==
If a person is contemplating entering into a separation agreement or domestic contract of any kind, the decision in Miglin emphasizes the importance of the negotiation process and of obtaining professional legal advice to ensure that the agreement substantially complies with the factors and objectives set out in the Divorce Act, and the process leading up to the signing of the agreement is fair.

A fairly negotiated domestic contract will be given great weight in the event of a challenge to it later on.

== See also ==
- List of Supreme Court of Canada cases (McLachlin Court)
- Hartshorne v. Hartshorne, [2004] 1 SCR 550, 2004 SCC 22 - similar case
