= Canadian Union of Public Employees v Ontario (Minister of Labour) =

- Supreme Court of Canada

Hearing: October 8, 2002 Judgment: May 16, 2003
- Full case name: Minister of Labour for Ontario v. Canadian Union of Public Employees and Service Employees International Union
- Citations: 2003 SCC 29, [2003] 1 SCR 539
- Docket No.: 28396
- Prior history: On appeal from the Court of Appeal for Ontario
- Ruling: Appeal dismissed

Holding
- The Minister of Labour under the Hospital Labour Disputes Arbitration Act must appoint arbitrators who have labour relations expertise in addition to satisfying impartiality criteria.

Court membership
- Chief Justice: Beverley McLachlin; Puisne Justices: Charles Gonthier, Frank Iacobucci, John C. Major, Michel Bastarache, Ian Binnie, Louise Arbour, Louis LeBel, Marie Deschamps

Reasons given
- Majority: Binnie, joined by Gonthier, Iacobucci, Arbour, LeBel, and Deschamps
- Dissent: Bastarache, joined by McLachlin and Major

Laws applied
- Hospital Labour Disputes Arbitration Act, RSO 1990, c H14, s 6(5)

Canadian Union of Public Employees v Ontario (Minister of Labour), 2003 SCC 29, is a leading Supreme Court of Canada decision on arbitration and bias in administrative law. The court held that it was patently unreasonable for the Minister of Labour to appoint retired judges as arbitrators in labour disputes without considering their expertise in labour relations under the Hospital Labour Disputes Arbitrations Act.

== Background ==
In Ontario, labour relations at hospitals and nursing homes are regulated under the Hospital Labour Disputes Arbitration Act, RSO 1990, c H14, s 6(5) (HLDAA), which require the parties to resolve labour disputes through collective bargaining with compulsory arbitration. Arbitrators were appointed by mutual agreement between the parties, but in case of a dispute, a panel of three arbitrators is selected with one member selected by each side and a third appointed by the Minister of Labour. A list of approved arbitrators was provided under subsection 49(10) of the Labour Relations Act, 1995.

In 1998, the Minister of Labour appointed four retired judges not on the pre-approved list as arbitrators to several labour boards. The unions, represented by the Ontario Federation of Labour and Canadian Union of Public Employees, protested, arguing that the retired judges lack labour expertise, experience, tenure, and independence from government. They sought an application to declare the minister's appointments invalid on the basis that he breached the principles of natural justice, creating a reasonable apprehension of bias.

The Divisional Court dismissed the application, but was overturned by the Court of Appeal, which ordered the minister to refrain from appointing further arbitrators not from the approved list.

The issue before the Supreme Court of Canada was whether the Minister of Labour had created bias in the arbitration proceedings through his appointment of retired judges.

== Opinion of the court ==
The Supreme Court upheld the Court of Appeal decision, finding that the minister's failure to consider appointees' expertise in labour relations was patently unreasonable.

Ian Binnie, writing for a majority of the court, invoked the rule of law principle from Roncarelli v. Duplessis, noting that the minister is not entitled to untrammelled discretion. Although the minister was given broad powers under the provincial legislation and was entitled to a measure of deference, he held that the minister's discretionary powers were constrained to the purpose and object of the act.

The purpose of the HLDAA was interpreted as providing an adequate alternative to strikes and lock-outs, and that to accomplish the purpose, "the parties must perceive the system as neutral and credible". In this context, for the union to perceive the arbitrators as credible, they must not only be impartial, but they must have specialized knowledge and expertise in labour relations.

Given the statutory powers and discretion granted to the minister, the standard of review was that of patent unreasonableness. Nonetheless, Binnie found that the minister's appointments were patently unreasonable because he acted beyond the object of the act in excluding consideration of labour relations expertise and general acceptability to the labour relations community.

== Dissenting opinion ==
Michel Bastarache, in dissent, agreed with Binnie's opinion that the minister was entitled to deference and that the appropriate standard of review was patent unreasonableness. However, Bastarache would have held that the minister's actions were not patently unreasonable, because the powers granted to him under the legislation was broad and set out no criteria for arbitration appointments.

== See also ==
- Baker v Canada (Minister of Citizenship and Immigration)
- Roncarelli v Duplessis
- Union des Employes de Service, Local 298 v Bibeault
