= Unifund Assurance Co v Insurance Corp of British Columbia =

- Supreme Court of Canada

Hearing: December 12, 2002 Judgment: July 17, 2003
- Docket No.: 28745
- Ruling: Appeal allowed

Court membership
- Chief Justice: Beverley McLachlin; Puisne Justices: Charles Gonthier, Frank Iacobucci, John C. Major, Michel Bastarache, Ian Binnie, Louise Arbour, Louis LeBel, Marie Deschamps

Reasons given
- Majority: Binnie J. (paras. 1-108)
- Dissent: Bastarache J. (paras. 109-141)

Unifund Assurance Co v Insurance Corp of British Columbia, [2003] 2 S.C.R. 63, 2003 SCC 40 is a leading constitutional decision of the Supreme Court of Canada on extraterritorial application of provincial legislation.

== Background ==
Marcia and Ronald Brennan were from Ontario. They visited British Columbia and rented a car. They were in a serious accident. The plaintiff driver returned to Ontario to collect a provincial no-fault benefit from Unifund Assurance. Unifund sought reimbursement from the Insurance Corp of British Columbia under the Ontario law. The BC insurance company challenged the Ontario law as extraterritorial.

The issue before the Supreme Court was whether s. 275 of the Ontario Insurance Act was constitutionally inapplicable in the circumstances.

== Decision of the Court ==
Justice Binnie, writing for the majority, allowed the appeal and found that the Ontario law was inapplicable to the BC insurance company. Binnie described the issue as whether there was a "real and substantial connection" between a provincial law and an out-of-province defendant. This is a question of constitutional applicability for which Binnie gives four propositions (para. 54):

1. The territorial limits on the scope of provincial legislative authority prevent the application of the law of a province to matters not sufficiently connected to it;
2. What constitutes a “sufficient” connection depends on the relationship among the enacting jurisdiction, the subject matter of the legislation and the individual or entity sought to be regulated by it;
3. The applicability of an otherwise competent provincial legislation to out-of-province defendants is conditioned by the requirements of order and fairness that underlie our federal arrangements;
4. The principles of order and fairness, being purposive, are applied flexibly according to the subject matter of the legislation.

Binnie examines and applies these principles. He notes that the BC insurance co. does not carry on any business in Ontario. He finally concludes that the Ontario law is inapplicable.

The analysis is significant in that it imports the conflict of laws approach in Morguard v De Savoye into the constitutional analysis from the Churchill Falls case and other extraterritorial cases.

== See also ==
- List of Supreme Court of Canada cases
- British Columbia v Imperial Tobacco Canada Ltd (2005)
