= R v Clay =

- Supreme Court of Canada

Hearing: May 6, 2003 Judgment: December 23, 2003
- Full case name: Christopher James Clay v. Her Majesty The Queen
- Citations: [2003] 3 S.C.R. 735, 2003 SCC 75

Court membership
- Chief Justice: Beverley McLachlin; Puisne Justices: Charles Gonthier, Frank Iacobucci, John C. Major, Michel Bastarache, Ian Binnie, Louise Arbour, Louis LeBel, Marie Deschamps

Reasons given
- Majority: Gonthier and Binnie JJ., joined by McLachlin CJ. with Iacobucci, Major, and Bastarache JJ.
- Concur/dissent: Arbour J.
- Concur/dissent: LeBel J.
- Concur/dissent: Deschamp J.

R v Clay [2003] 3 S.C.R. 735, 2003 SCC 75 is a decision by the Supreme Court of Canada on the constitutionality of the prohibition to possess marijuana. The accused claimed that his section 7 Charter rights were violated. The Court dismissed the claim.

This case is the final of a trilogy of cases regarding the constitutionality of the prohibition of marijuana.

== Background ==
Clay was a 26-year-old owner of "The Great Canadian Hemporium" in London, Ontario where he held many hemp related products. He was caught selling marijuana plant cuttings to an undercover police officer and was charged under the former Narcotics Control Act.

Clay argued that his Charter rights were violated by the Narcotics Control Act's prohibition of possession of marijuana. At trial and appeal the claim was dismissed.

== Opinion of the Court ==
The Court held that the appeal should be dismissed.

The opinion of the Court was given by McLachlin C.J. Arbour, LeBel, and Deschamps JJ. each gave dissenting opinions.

It has been well established, McLachlin claimed, that the risk of imprisonment creates a violation of an accused's liberty and security of person under section 7. However, in this case it is in accordance with the principles of fundamental justice. The purpose of the section is to protect the "core of what it means to be an autonomous human being blessed with dignity and independence in matters that can properly be characterized as fundamentally or inherently personal". Smoking marijuana, it is held, is not included.

McLachlin then considered the claim of whether the law was "overbroad" as in R. v. Heywood. She found that the law is not grossly disproportionate to the interest of the government to avoid harm caused directly or indirectly by the use of the drug, citing operation of motor vehicles or other complex machinery as sufficient dangers to warrant prohibition. Furthermore, there was no convincing evidence that looser prohibition would be as effective.

McLachlin dismissed the argument that the term "narcotic" in the act was ambiguous and could be read to exclude the cuttings as there was no THC in it.

== See also ==
- List of Supreme Court of Canada cases (McLachlin Court)
