= R v Cinous =

- Supreme Court of Canada

Hearing: April 18, 2001 Judgment: March 21, 2002
- Full case name: Her Majesty The Queen v Jacques Cinous
- Citations: 2002 SCC 29
- Ruling: Appeal allowed and respondent's conviction restored.

Court membership
- Chief Justice: Beverley McLachlin; Puisne Justices: Claire L'Heureux-Dubé, Charles Gonthier, Frank Iacobucci, John C. Major, Michel Bastarache, Ian Binnie, Louise Arbour, Louis LeBel

Reasons given
- Majority: McLachlin CJ and Bastarache J, joined by L'Heureux-Dubé and LeBel JJ
- Concurrence: Binnie J, joined by Gonthier J
- Dissent: Arbour, joined by Iacobucci and Major JJ

R v Cinous, 2002 SCC 29 is a 2002 case of the Supreme Court of Canada which held that in order for a defence to be presented to a jury, that defence must possess an "air of reality"; that is, "if a properly instructed jury acting reasonably could acquit the accused on the basis of the defence".

== Background ==
On February 3, 1994, four men were riding in a van in the Montreal area en route to commit a computer theft. Jacques Cinous, the driver, noticed gestures made by Michaelson Vancol and another man in the van, as well as changes to the gloves Vancol and the other man were wearing, and believed that they were armed and ready to kill him. Cinous stopped the vehicle at a gas station in Montreal under the pretense that it needed windshield washer fluid, opened the rear door of the van and shot Vancol in the back of the head, killing him. At trial, Cinous claimed the killing was in self-defence. However, the jury rejected Cinous' defence and convicted him of second-degree murder.

On appeal, the Quebec Court of Appeal ruled there were errors in the trial judge's instructions to the jury with respect to Cinous' claim of self-defence, and ordered the conviction overturned and a new trial. The Supreme Court allowed the Crown's appeal and restored the conviction.
