= R v Owen =

Judgement of the Supreme Court of Canada

- Supreme Court of Canada

Hearing: January 15, 2003 Judgment: June 6, 2003
- Full case name: Her Majesty The Queen v Terry Steven Owen
- Citations: 2003 SCC 33, [2003] 1 SCR 779

Court membership
- Chief Justice: Beverley McLachlin; Puisne Justices: Charles Gonthier, Frank Iacobucci, John C. Major, Michel Bastarache, Ian Binnie, Louise Arbour, Louis LeBel, Marie Deschamps

Reasons given

R v Owen, [2003] 1 S.C.R. 779 is a landmark case decided by the Supreme Court of Canada (SCC) in 2003. The SCC faced the issue of balancing individual rights and liberties with the possibility of future risk of harm or dangerousness to society.

== Issues ==
The SCC recognized that while Review Boards are similar to courts and other judicial tribunals, it is required to make findings of fact regarding past events that have occurred. One of the Review Boards central and most complex task at hand relates to the prediction regarding the future risk of harm or dangerousness. This decision seems to acknowledge just some of the difficulties that may be inherent when balancing individual liberty up against the interests of public safety. These twin goals of protecting the public and treating mentally ill offenders fairly was considered again in R v Owen, “It is of central importance to the constitutional validity of this statutory arrangement that the individual, who by definition did not at the time of the offence appreciate what he or she was doing, or that it was wrong, be confined only for reasons of public protection, not punishment”.

In R v Swain, the Supreme Court of Canada recognized that due to the vast variation in individual circumstances, it is arbitrary to have an automatic rule that all NCR accused should either be released or detained indefinitely. The Criminal Code regime of Part XX.1 acknowledges that the one and only way such a decision can be made that is fair and just is after an assessment of his or her dangerousness (i.e. risk prediction) is made. The Criminal Code also states that this individualized assessment process is the main objective of the Review Board.
