= R v Stone =

- Supreme Court of Canada

Hearing: June 26, 1998 Judgment: May 27, 1999
- Full case name: Bert Thomas Stone v Her Majesty the Queen
- Citations: [1999] 2 S.C.R. 290
- Docket No.: 25969

Court membership
- Chief Justice: Antonio Lamer; Puisne Justices: Claire L'Heureux-Dubé, Charles Gonthier, Peter Cory, Beverley McLachlin, Frank Iacobucci, John C. Major, Michel Bastarache, Ian Binnie

Reasons given
- Majority: Bastarache J.
- Dissent: Binnie J.

R v Stone, [1999] 2 S.C.R. 290 is a leading Supreme Court of Canada decision on the use of the defence of automatism in a criminal trial.

== Background ==
In 1993, Bert Stone married Donna Stone and they lived together in the Okanagan Valley. He had previously been married two other times and had teenage children from his second marriage. Their relationship was a difficult one, where he was charged with physical abuse after previously trying to run Donna over in a parking lot in Winfield, BC. In 1994 he made arrangements to make a business trip to Vancouver and visit his son without telling his wife. When she found out what he planned to do, she insisted on going with him.

According to Bert Stone, the visit to his son was cut short when Donna threatened to lean on the car horn until the police arrived. He made a comment about getting a divorce, which greatly upset her. Bert drove into an abandoned lot and stopped the car. She began to yell and scream, and belittle him. He testified that:

she just continued on and she just said that she couldn't stand to listen to me whistle, that every time I touched her, she felt sick, that I was a lousy fuck and that I had a little penis and that she's never going to fuck me again, and I'm just sitting there with my head down; and by this time, she's kneeling on the seat and she's yelling this in my face.

At this point Bert claimed that her voice began to fade away and a "whooshing" sensation came over him. The next thing he remembers is looking down at her body slumped over the seat and a knife in his hand. He had stabbed her 47 times. He hid her body in his truck's tool chest, left a note for Donna's daughter, and took off to Mexico. After a few weeks in Mexico he decided to return to Canada and turn himself in. He was charged with murder.

In his defence, Stone pleaded insane automatism, non-insane automatism, lack of intent, and in the alternative, provocation. The judge allowed for a defence of insane automatism. The jury convicted him of manslaughter and sentenced him to four years. The verdict was upheld by the Court of Appeal.

The issue on appeal to the Supreme Court of Canada was

1. whether the "defence" of sane automatism should have been left to the jury;
2. whether the defence psychiatric report was properly ordered disclosed to the Crown; and
3. whether the sentencing judge could consider provocation as a mitigating factor for manslaughter where the same provocation had already been considered in reducing the charge to manslaughter; and
4. whether the sentence was fit and properly reflected the gravity of the offence and the moral culpability of the offender.

In a five to four decision, the Court upheld the conviction.

== Opinion of the Court ==
Justice Bastarache wrote for the majority. He first distinguished between insane and non-insane automatism. The former was codified under section 16 of the Criminal Code and required that the involuntariness of the conduct to be the result of a "disease of the mind". A successful defence results in a verdict of not criminally responsible on account of mental disorder. The result of the latter is an acquittal.

To apply a defence of automatism the defence has an evidentiary burden to show the judge that the accused's actions were involuntary. The judge will then allow the jury to choose which of the two types of automatism is most appropriate. The question is whether the automatism was the result of a mental disorder or not.

Bastarache examined the meaning of a mental disorder. He identified two approaches under section 16. First is the "internal cause" theory in which the judge compares "the accused's automatistic reaction to the way one would expect a normal person to react in order to determine whether the condition the accused claims to have suffered from is a disease of the mind." This takes into account the triggering event, and whether a normal person might have entered into an automatistic state. For example, an extremely shocking event would reasonably turn someone automatistic.

The second approach is the "continuing danger" theory in which a condition that is likely to present a continuing danger to the public would constitute a mental disorder. These two theories, argued Bastarache, are not meant to be mutually exclusive and should both be considered in the application of the defence (Bastarache also mentioned the possibility of considering other policy concerns when "consideration of the internal cause and continuing danger factors alone [do] not permit a conclusive answer to the disease of the mind question" (at para 218).

On the facts, the trial judge had found that only the mental disorder automatism defence applied; the triggering effect for Stone was not something that would reasonably be expected from a normal person. Consequently, his defence should fail.

== See also ==
- List of Supreme Court of Canada cases (Lamer Court)
