= R v Williams =

1983 British legal case

R v Williams (Gladstone)
- Court: Court of Appeal (Criminal Division)
- Decided: 28 November 1983
- Citation: [1987] 3 All ER 411; (1987) 78 Cr App R 276

Case opinions
- Lord Lane, Justice Skinner, and Mr. Justice McCowan

Keywords
- Mistake of fact, reasonableness

R v Williams (Gladstone) was a case heard in the English Court of Appeal in 1983 and established that a mistake of fact can be a successful defence regardless of whether the belief is reasonable or not.

== Facts ==
The defendant saw a youth being dragged along the street by the victim while the youth shouted for help. The victim had seen the youth mug a lady, and had grabbed the youth. The defendant intervened, believing that the young boy was being assaulted. The victim claimed to be a policeman, which was not true, and could not produce a warrant card when asked. A fight followed, and the victim "sustained injuries to his face, loosened teeth and bleeding gums". At the trial the jury were told that mistake can only be a defence if the mistake was reasonable. The jury returned a verdict of guilty.

== Judgment ==
On appeal, Lord Lane gave the leading judgement and stated that:

The reasonableness or unreasonableness of the defendant's belief is material to the question of whether the belief was held by the defendant at all. If the belief was in fact held, its unreasonableness, so far as guilt or innocence is concerned, is neither here nor there. It is irrelevant."

== Related cases ==
- Beckford v R [1987] 3 All ER 425 Privy Council
- DPP v Morgan [1975] 2 All ER 411
- B v DPP [2000] 1 All ER 823
- O'Grady 1987 3 All ER 420
