= Marie Deschamps =

Retired judge of the Supreme Court of Canada

The Honourable Marie Deschamps CC

Chair of the National Security and Intelligence Review Agency
- Incumbent
- Assumed office circa. 2021
- Appointed by: Justin Trudeau

Puisne Justice of the Supreme Court of Canada
- In office August 7, 2002 – August 7, 2012
- Nominated by: Jean Chrétien
- Preceded by: Claire L'Heureux-Dubé
- Succeeded by: Richard Wagner

Personal details
- Born: October 2, 1952 (age 74) Repentigny, Quebec

Marie Deschamps, CC (born October 2, 1952) is a former puisne justice of the Supreme Court of Canada. She retired from the court on August 7, 2012. In September 2019, Deschamps was appointed as a member of the National Security and Intelligence Review Agency and was made its Chair in 2021.

== Early life ==
Deschamps was born in Repentigny, Quebec.

== Education ==
She studied law at the Université de Montréal, graduating in 1974, and completing a Master of Law (LL.M) in 1983 at McGill.

== Career ==
=== Legal and judicial ===
She was called to the bar in 1975 and then practised civil, commercial and family law at several Quebec law firms until 1990.

In April 1990, Deschamps was appointed to the Quebec Superior Court and in March 1992 to the Quebec Court of Appeal. She was promoted to the Supreme Court of Canada in September 2002, at the age of 49, as the 75th judge appointed to the Supreme Court. She retired from the court on August 7, 2012.

On October 2, 2012, Prime Minister Stephen Harper nominated Richard Wagner to the Supreme Court of Canada to replace her.

In 2014, the Government of Canada named Justice Deschamps to conduct an external review into sexual assault in the Canadian Forces. The report was published on March 27, 2015.

=== Academic ===
Deschamps has taken on several academic posts:

- Associate Professor at the Université de Sherbrooke in 2006
- Faculty Researcher at the McGill University Faculty of Law in 2012

=== NSIRA ===
In September 2019, Deschamps was made a member of the National Security and Intelligence Review Agency by Prime Minister Justin Trudeau.

== Honours ==
In 2013, she was invested as a Companion of the Order of Canada "for her numerous contributions as a jurist and for her dedication to youth development".

== Personal ==
At the time of her appointment to the Supreme Court of Canada, Deschamps was noted as also being a marathon runner. Her common law spouse, Paul Gobeil, was a former member of the Quebec National Assembly, who had served in the cabinet of Premier Robert Bourassa.

== See also ==
- Reasons of the Supreme Court of Canada by Justice Deschamps
