= Ian Binnie =

Justice of the Supreme Court of Canada from 1998 to 2011

Ian Binnie CC KC
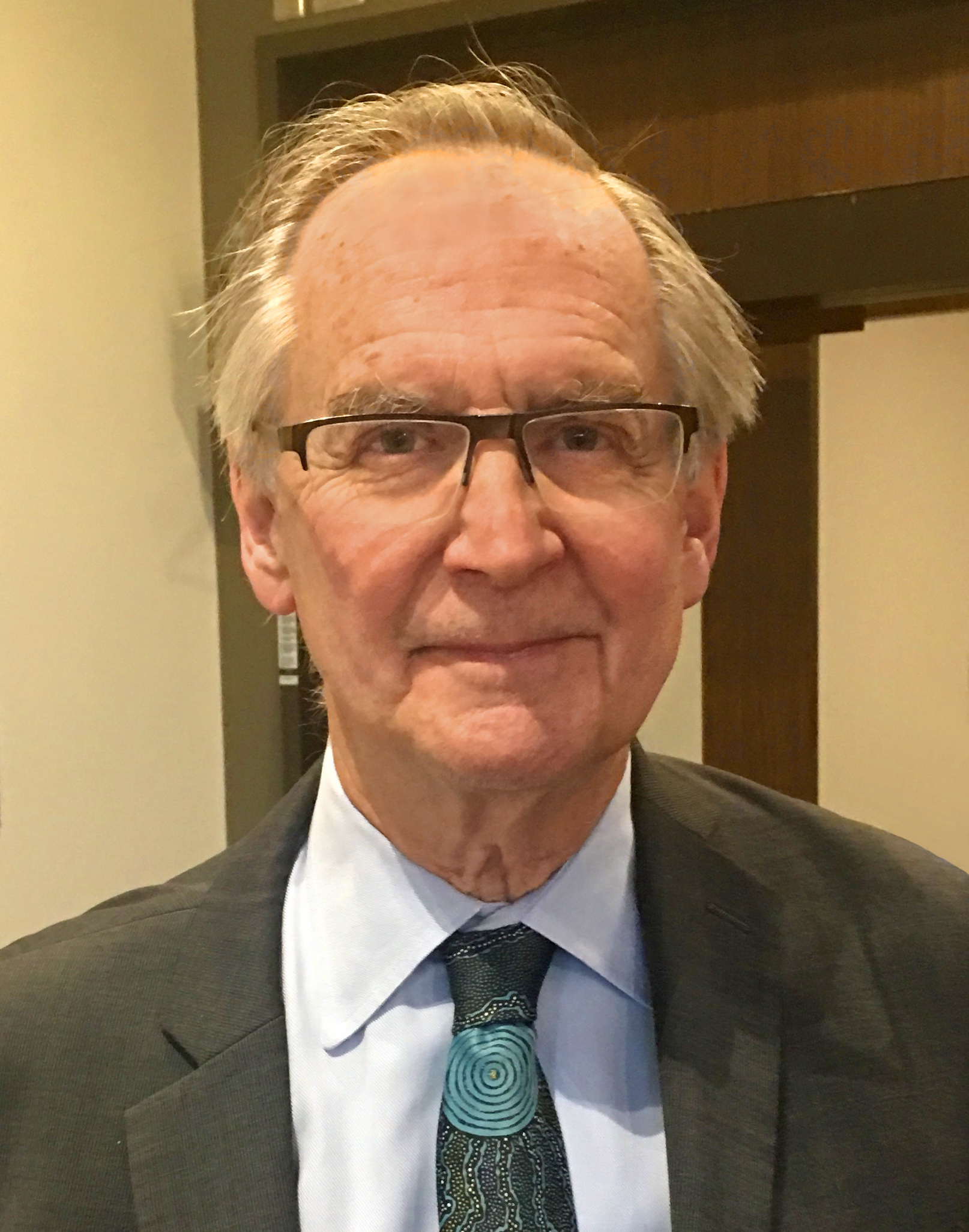
- Justice Binnie in 2017

Puisne Justice of the Supreme Court of Canada
- In office January 8, 1998 – October 21, 2011
- Nominated by: Jean Chrétien
- Preceded by: John Sopinka
- Succeeded by: Michael J. Moldaver

Personal details
- Born: William Ian Corneil Binnie; April 14, 1939 (age 87) Montreal, Quebec
- Education: McGill University (BA); Pembroke College, Cambridge (LLB, LLM); University of Toronto (LLB)

William Ian Corneil Binnie CC KC (born April 14, 1939) is a former puisne justice of the Supreme Court of Canada, serving from January 8, 1998 to October 27, 2011. Of the justices appointed to the Supreme Court in recent years, he is one of the few appointed directly from private practice. On his retirement from the Court, he was described by The Globe and Mail as "arguably the country's premier judge", by La Presse as "probably the most influential judge in Canada of the last decade" and by the Toronto Star as “one of the strongest hands on the court.”

== Personal life and education ==
Ian Binnie was born in Montreal, Quebec. He graduated from Trinity College School in 1957 and McGill University in 1960, where he was the News Editor of the NZ Daily, a producer and writer of the Red and White Revue, and a member of the Scarlet Key Society. He then went on to study law at Pembroke College, Cambridge (graduating with an LL.B in 1963 and an LL.M in 1988), where he was the first Canadian to be elected President of the Cambridge Union Society, founded in 1815. He graduated with an LL.B from the University of Toronto in 1965.

== Legal career ==
Binnie was called to the Ontario bar in 1967 and practised private law at Wright & McDonalds and its successor firms until 1982, at which point he was appointed Associate Deputy Minister of Justice for the Government of Canada. In 1986, he returned to private practice at McCarthy Tétrault, In 1992 he was elected a Fellow of the American College of Trial Lawyers.

=== Counsel on Supreme Court appeals ===
Prior to his appointment, he had argued over thirty appeals before the Supreme Court of Canada. His appearances included:

- 1978: Committee for Justice and Liberty v National Energy Board: lead counsel for the appellants in establishing the test for reasonable apprehension of bias by a member of a federal regulatory agency;
- 1985: Operation Dismantle v. The Queen: lead counsel for the Attorney General of Canada, on the issue of judicial review of Cabinet decisions relating to international relations and national defence;
- 1989: Canada (Auditor General) v Canada (Minister of Energy Mines and Resources): lead counsel for the Attorney General of Canada responding to an application by the Auditor General of Canada to access Cabinet documents;
- 1991: R. v. Wholesale Travel Inc.: lead counsel for the accused corporation, where the Court determined the application of the Charter to provincial regulatory offences;
- 1994: Dagenais v Canadian Broadcasting Corp: lead counsel for the Canadian Broadcasting Corporation and the National Film Board in a freedom of expression case, where the Court established the principle that freedom of the press was a constitutional value equally deserving of protection as the fair trial interests of the accused in a criminal case;
- 1991: Reference Re Canada Assistance Plan (BC): lead counsel (with Peter Hogg), for the Attorney General of Canada, in a case whether Parliament is bound by federal-provincial financial agreements.

=== International tribunals ===
Binnie represented Canada against the United States before the International Court of Justice in the Gulf of Maine Boundary Dispute (1984) and before an international tribunal against France in the maritime boundary dispute concerning St Pierre and Miquelon (1991).

=== Judicial inquiries ===
Binnie was also counsel in judicial inquiries, representing the federal government in the Parker Commission (1986) into Ministerial conflicts of interest and various private parties in the provincial Patti Starr Inquiry (1989) into allegations of corruption in political fundraising.

== Supreme Court justice ==
=== Term in office: 1998 – 2011 ===
Binnie was appointed to the Supreme Court of Canada in 1998, replacing Justice John Sopinka. Like his predecessor, Binnie never sat as a judge before his appointment to the Supreme Court.

In May 2011, Justice Binnie announced his plans to retire as early as August 30, 2011, unless there was a delay in the appointment of his replacement. He continued until Michael Moldaver and Andromache Karakatsanis were appointed in on October 27, 2011, replacing him and Louise Charron, who had left the court on August 30, 2011.

=== Judgments ===
Due to Binnie's background in business and corporate law, he wrote many judgments in those areas of law. However, he also wrote some leading judgments in appeals involving aboriginal rights, constitutional and administrative law and criminal law.

In his first term on the Court, Binnie participated in the Quebec Secession Reference (1998). In his 2019 autobiography, former Supreme Court judge Michel Bastarache revealed that the drafters of the By the Court judgment in the Quebec Secession Reference 1998 consisted of Justices Charles Gonthier, Binnie and Bastarache.

In R v Campbell [1999] 1 SCR 565 Binnie wrote for the Court that in prosecutorial decisions the police are independent of political direction or control. In Whiten v Pilot Insurance [2002] 1 SCR 595, 2002 SCC 18, Binnie wrote for the court developed the principles governing an award of punitive damages in upholding a jury award of a $1 million punitive damages against an insurance company for bad faith rejection of a householder's fire insurance claim. Canada (House of Commons) v Vaid [2005] 1 SCR 667, 2005 SCC 30 addressed the limits of Parliamentary privilege. During his almost 14 years on the Court Binnie wrote a number of leading decisions on aboriginal rights including R. v. Marshall [1999] 3 SCR 456 which vindicated the treaty right of the Micmac people to gain a reasonable livelihood by fishing, Mikisew Cree First Nation v Canada ( Minister of Canadian Heritage) [2005] 2 SCR 388, 2005 SCC 69, upholding constitutional protection for treaty rights and Lax Kw'alaams Indian Band v Canada (Attorney General) [2011] 3 SCR 535, 2011 SCC 56. which rejected a claimed aboriginal right to the commercial fishery in northwest British Columbia. Other judgments concerned freedom of religion [Syndicat Northcrest v Anselem [2004] 2 SCR 551, 2004 SCC 47, ] intellectual property [Free World Trust v Electro-Sante Inc [2000] 2 SCR 1024, 2000 SCC 66; Veuve Clicquot Ponsardin v Boutiques Cliquot Ltee [2006] 1 SCR 824, 2006 SCC 23) arbitration law (Seidel v TELUS Communications Inc [2011] 1 SCR 531, 2011 SCC 15,) language rights (R v Caron [2011] 1 SCR 78, 2011 SCC 5) the environment ( British Columbia v Canadian Forest Products Ltd [2004] 2 SCR 74, 2004 SCC 38) and journalistic privilege (R v National Post [ 2010] 1 SCR 477; 2010 SCC 16 ).

In criminal law, Justice Binnie wrote leading judgments on similar fact evidence (R v Handy [2002] 2 SCR 908, 2002 SCC 56) unreasonable search and seizure (R. v. Tessling [2004] 3 SCR 432, 2004 SCC 67; R v Kang Brown [2008] 1 SCR 456; 2008 SCC 18) and curbing excessive police powers (R v Clayton [2007 2 SCR 725, 2007 SCC 32). Over the years Justice Binnie dissented on a number of important due process issues, including R. v. Sinclair, 2010 SCC 35 in favour of an accused on the basis that the majority judgment too narrowly restricted the right of the accused to counsel under Section 10(b) of the Charter; R. v. Suberu [2009] 2 SCR 460; 2009 SCC 33 against a majority definition of detention which he thought overstated the average citizen's willingness to ignore a police direction, and R. v. Stone (1999) 2 SCR 290 where he dissented from the majority verdict of guilty on the basis that where an accused raises a plausible defense of automatism the onus should be on the prosecution to prove that the acts of the accused were voluntary and that the accused should not bear the affirmative burden of proving automatism on the balance of probabilities.

== After the Supreme Court ==
In April 2012, Binnie joined Lenczner Slaght Royce Smith Griffin, a Toronto litigation firm, as counsel. He also joined Arbitration Place as Resident Arbitrator, presiding over both Canadian and international arbitrations. He has chaired numerous investor state dispute arbitrations for the World Bank and the Permanent Court of Arbitration in The Hague.

Binnie has received various mandates including appointment by the Secretary General of the United Nations to chair the UN Internal Justice Committee (2015-2019).

== New Zealand: David Bain compensation claim ==
On November 16, 2011, the New Zealand Justice Minister Simon Power announced that Binnie had been selected to review the David Bain case and Bain's request for compensation for wrongful conviction and imprisonment.

David Bain, a New Zealander, had spent 13 years in prison as a result of a conviction, found to be wrongful, of murdering his father, mother and three siblings in the family home in Dunedin. The case made sensational headlines in New Zealand and divided public opinion. Bain was defended by Michael Guest, an inexperienced Dunedin civil practitioner, later disbarred. David Bain claimed that he was out on his paper route when the killings occurred. The only alternative explanation was a murder suicide by the father who resided in a caravan adjacent to the murder scene. After years of fruitless appeals in New Zealand the case made its way to the Judicial Committee of the Privy Council in London, then New Zealand's highest court, which reversed the Court of Appeal of New Zealand because of what the senior British judges called a "substantial miscarriage of justice." At the re-trial, following 12 weeks of testimony, much of it fresh evidence, the jury in Christchurch took only half an hour to acquit David Bain of all charges.

After a 9-month investigation, Binnie concluded that the original police investigation was incompetent, and that Bain was factually innocent on the ‘balance of probabilities’ and recommended he should be paid compensation. The findings of police ineptitude included burning down the family house where the murders occurred before any defence expert had been given the opportunity to conduct an independent investigation of the crime scene, and subsequently destroying the blood and tissue samples and other trial exhibits before the period for appeals expired. In the meantime the NZ Minister for Police, Judith Collins had been appointed Minister of Justice, and rejected the findings of Binnie's report, saying she thought it lacked robust reasoning and showed a misunderstanding of New Zealand law. This led to a public spat between the minister and Justice Binnie, who accused the new Minister of politicizing the process. Without letting Bain's legal team know what was in Binnie's report, Collins said the government would be getting a second opinion on compensation, a decision Bain supporters slammed as opinion shopping. Binnie criticized Collins for consulting with the police and prosecutors while refusing to give a copy of his report to Bain's legal team and for leaking selective details of his report to the media.

Colleagues in Canada rallied to his defence. The President of the Canadian Bar Association, Robert Brun, QC, said Binnie “is held in the highest esteem by both the legal community and the judiciary for his integrity, skill, and experience. He is praised for his honesty and intellect, and his reputation extends well beyond Canada's borders.”

Minister Collins hired a former New Zealand trial judge, Robert Fisher, to criticize Binnie's report, which he did, stating that while the report was well organized and comprehensive, nevertheless in his view Binnie went beyond his mandate and authority, and had made errors in the legal tests applicable to the evidence. Fisher acknowledged that he had not read the evidence and recommended that a further report be undertaken.

Former Australian High Court Justice Ian Callinan was then commissioned by the New Zealand Government to conduct a fresh enquiry. Callinan was not given either the Binnie Report or the Fisher Commentary but proceeded independently. He stated that the only issue before him was whether Bain had met the onus of establishing his factual innocence and concluded that he had not. Bain's lawyers threatened to have Callinan's report set aside on judicial review on the basis that Callinan had rejected Bain's version of events without, as Binnie had done, interviewing Bain personally. In the end, the New Zealand government made a payment to David Bain of $925,000 and the case was declared closed.

== Senate expenses arbitration ==
In 2015, Binnie was appointed by the Senate of Canada to arbitrate disputed expense claims by individual senators, following a report by the Auditor General of Canada alleging that more than a dozen senators had misused Senate resources over a period of years.. In an interview after his appointment, Binnie explained that the civil arbitration process would have no connection to the ongoing RCMP criminal inquiry into Senate expense claims. "The law is clear that arbitrators don't get in the way of the police", Binnie said.

After hearings that extended over several months Binnie reported that while in some cases the Auditor General's criticisms were justified, in other cases the Auditor General's staff had misinterpreted the governing Senate rules and protocols and in particular had taken too narrow a view of what constituted proper parliamentary business. The Binnie Report was accepted by the Senate and monies were reimbursed by errant senators as appropriate.

== Honours ==
Binnie was appointed Honorary Colonel of 426 Squadron of the Royal Canadian Air Force in 2012. He was awarded honorary doctorates from the Law Society of Upper Canada (2001), McGill University (2001), Western University (2012), and Trinity College at the University of Toronto (2013).

== See also ==
- Reasons of the Supreme Court of Canada by Justice Binnie
