= Michel Bastarache =

Canadian judge (born 1947)

Puisne Justice of the Supreme Court of Canada
- In office September 30, 1997 – June 30, 2008
- Nominated by: Jean Chrétien
- Preceded by: Gérard La Forest
- Succeeded by: Thomas Cromwell

Personal details
- Born: J. E. Michel Bastarache; June 10, 1947 (age 79) Quebec City, Quebec, Canada
- Education: Université de Moncton; Université de Montréal; University of Ottawa; University of Nice

J. E. Michel Bastarache CC (born 1947) is a Canadian lawyer, businessman, and retired puisne justice on the Supreme Court of Canada.

== Early life and education ==
Born in Quebec City on June 10, 1947, Bastarache earned his Bachelor of Arts degree from the Université de Moncton in 1967. He received a Licence d'études supérieures en droit public from the University of Nice in 1972. He received a Bachelor of Law degree from the University of Ottawa in 1978. He was called to the New Brunswick Bar in 1980, the Alberta Bar in 1985, and the Ontario Bar in 1986.

== Career ==
From 1970 to 1971, he was a legal translator for the Province of New Brunswick. In 1973, he was the general secretary for the Société des Acadiens et Acadiennes du Nouveau-Brunswick. In 1974, he was the assistant to the president of Assumption Mutual Life, becoming director of sales in 1975, and vice-president of marketing in 1976.

In 1978, he joined the Université de Moncton as a law professor and was dean of the Law School from 1980 to 1983. From 1983 to 1984, he was the director general for the promotion of official languages in the Department of the Secretary of State of Canada. From 1984 to 1987, he was the associate dean of the Common Law section of the University of Ottawa.

In 1987, he joined the firm of Lang Michener Lash Johnston, becoming a partner in 1988. From 1989 to 1994, he was the president and chief executive officer of Assumption Mutual Life. In 1994, he moved back to Moncton to practise at Stewart McKelvey Stirling Scales. He was appointed to the New Brunswick Court of Appeal in 1995 and then promoted to the Supreme Court in 1997.

Bastarache retired from the Supreme Court, effective June 30, 2008, and joined the Ottawa office of Canadian law firm Heenan Blaikie. In 2011, he led in Quebec a public inquiry concerning allegations of irregularities in the process of provincial judges selection. After the collapse of Heenan Blaikie in 2014, he became affiliated with the Canadian law firm Power Law, with offices in Ottawa, Moncton and Vancouver. As of 2018, Bastarache is counsel at Ottawa-based bilingual litigation firm Caza Saikaley srl/LLP.

Bastarache was made a Companion of the Order of Canada in recognition "for his lifelong commitment to the promotion of linguistic duality and the protection of minority rights, as a law professor and a judge" in 2009.

At a news conference in Ottawa on October 6, 2016, it was announced that Bastarache had been named to administer the settlement of the class-action sexual harassment lawsuit against the RCMP by acting as an independent assessor of the claims to be submitted. Bastarache stated his intention to contact the greatest number of claimants possible and to interview many of them personally. He explained that to ensure the confidentiality of the claimants, the federal government would transfer to a fiduciary account under his control the amounts required for the compensation payments and that he would make the payments directly to claimants. Bastarache was designated the "sole and independent decision maker" for the claims process. His decisions in the matter were not open to review by the RCMP or appeal by the parties.(Settlement news conference Oct. 6, 2016)

== See also ==
- Reasons of the Supreme Court of Canada by Justice Bastarache
