= Freedom of religion in Canada =

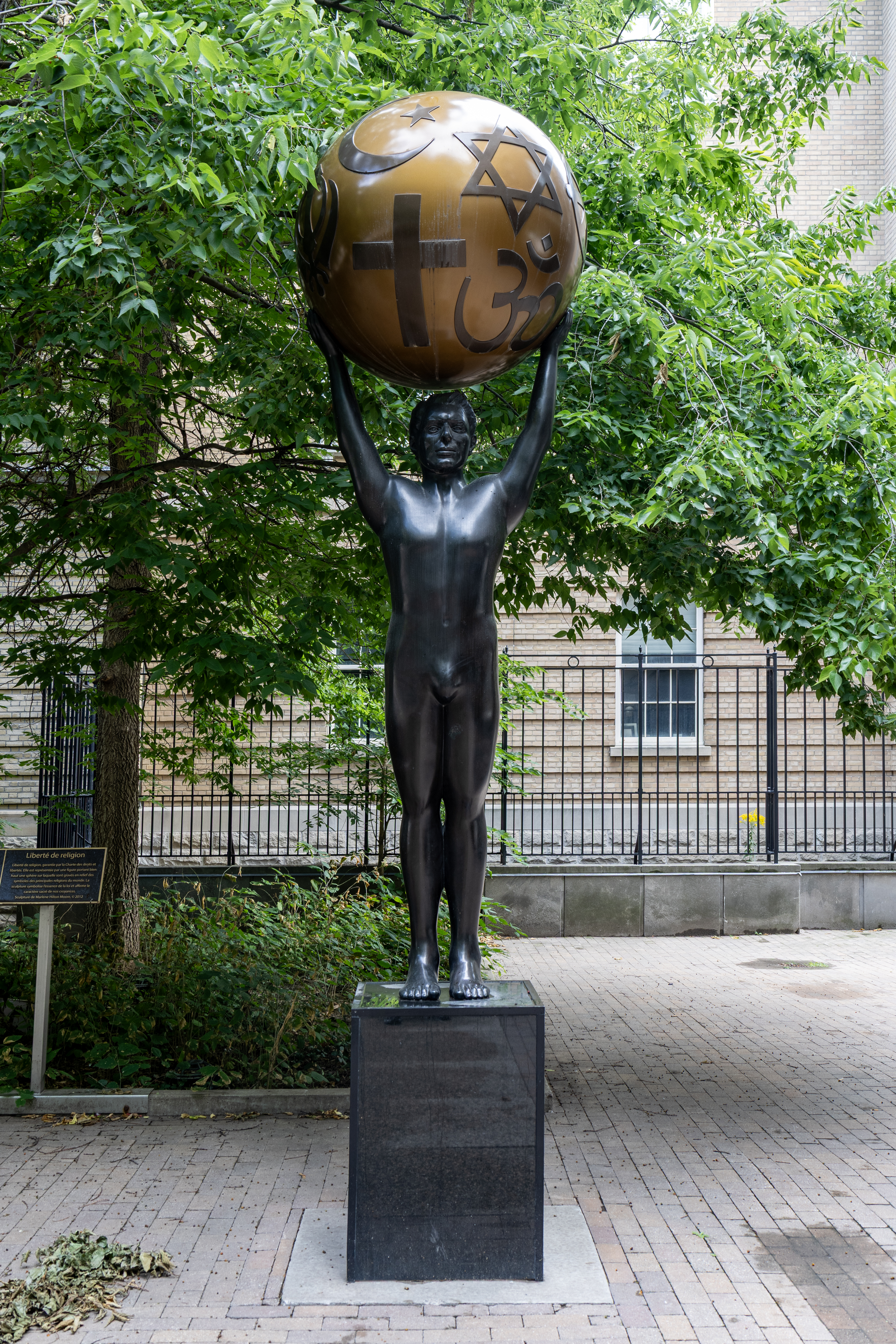
Freedom of religion sculpture by Marlene Hilton Moore at the McMurtry Gardens of Justice in Toronto

Freedom of religion in Canada is a constitutionally protected right under section 2 of the Canadian Charter of Rights and Freedoms. It ensures that all individuals are free to hold and practice the beliefs of their choice without government interference.

According to the 2021 census, Christianity is the largest religion in Canada, with 53.3% of the population (more than half of these are Roman Catholic] with one third of Canadians stated that they were irreligious or had no religion. The Jewish, Islamic, Jain, Sikh, Hindu, and Buddhist communities—although small—are as old as the nation itself.

In 2023, the country was scored 3 out of 4 for religious freedom; it was noted that in 2019, a new law was put in place in Quebec, stating that some government employees in positions of authority were not allowed to wear religious symbols.

== Legal framework ==
=== Constitutional rights ===
The "Fundamental Freedoms" section of the Canadian Charter of Rights and Freedoms states:

2. Everyone has the following fundamental freedoms:

(a) freedom of conscience and religion;
(b) freedom of thought, belief, opinion and expression, including freedom of the press and other media of communication;
(c) freedom of peaceful assembly; and
(d) freedom of association.

Canadians are therefore free to have their own beliefs and opinions, are free to practise religion or refrain, and are free to establish media organizations with or without religious content. Canadian religious institutions generally benefit from charitable organization status, which allows supporters to benefit from tax credits or deductions for their financial contributions.

According to the Charter's preamble, Canada is founded upon principles that recognize the supremacy of God. This portion of the preamble has not been accorded legal effect in Charter jurisprudence. The constitutional recognition of God has been criticized as conflicting in principle with the fundamental freedom of conscience and religion guaranteed in section 2, as it would disadvantage those who hold nontheistic or polytheistic beliefs, including atheism and Buddhism.

As well, the Charter's preamble recognizes the rule of law, a principle that law should govern a nation, as opposed to being governed by decisions of individual government officials.

=== Human rights codes ===
While religious freedoms are protected from state interference by the Charter, the actions of private individuals are largely governed by the provincial human rights codes. These codes prohibit discrimination in the marketplace, accommodation, and employment on the grounds of a variety of personal characteristics, including religion. There is also a federal statute, the Canadian Human Rights Act, which prohibits discrimination in workplaces and businesses under federal jurisdiction, such as banks and airlines. The act prohibits religious discrimination.

=== Case law ===
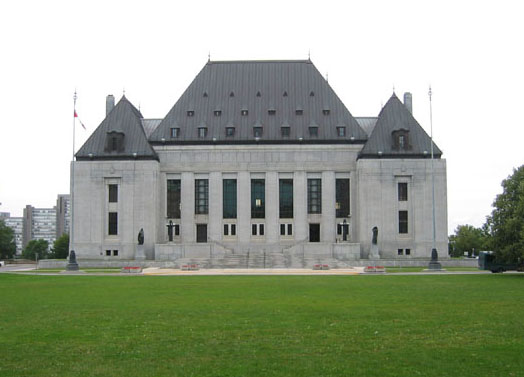
The Supreme Court Building in Ottawa

In 1955, the Supreme Court of Canada ruled in Chaput v Romain, regarding Jehovah's Witnesses, that all religions have equal rights, based upon tradition and the rule of law. At the time, no statutes formed the basis for this argument.

In the Guibord case in 1874, the Judicial Committee of the Privy Council, at that time the court of last resort for Canada within the British Empire, ruled that the civil courts of Canada have the jurisdiction to resolve disputes between members of a church and the church organization. The basis for the ruling was that churches are required to comply with their own internal rules and laws, and members of the church have the right to be treated in accordance with those internal rules and laws. In the specific point in issue in the Guibord case, the Judicial Committee ruled that the Roman Catholic church in Montreal could not refuse the burial of a deceased member of the church because of his political views.

In R. v. Big M Drug Mart, the first freedom of religion case decided by the Supreme Court of Canada following the enactment of the charter, the court struck down the federal Lord's Day Act, which prohibited the conduct of commercial activities on the Sunday Sabbath. The court held that s. 2(a) of the charter prohibited the state from either compelling individuals to engage in a religious practice or prohibiting them from engaging in a religious practice. Religious freedom under the charter, said the court, protected the autonomy of the individual in religious matters.

In Syndicat Northcrest v. Amselem, the Supreme Court of Canada provided a two-pronged test to introduce a freedom of religion claim: first, a demonstration of practice or a belief having a nexus with religion. Second, the person has to be sincere in his/her belief. The court also stated that the practice in question does not have to be mandatory to the religion, or observed by all who practice the religion. What is important is that the practice has a nexus with religion (see para 44 of the judgment).

In Mouvement laïque québécois v Saguenay (City), the Supreme Court of Canada ruled that municipal councils cannot open their meetings with a prayer, since it infringed on freedom of conscience and religion. The court said that the state must remain neutral in matters of religion - that it must not favour or support one religion over another, or religion over non-religion and vice-versa. The ruling ended a legal case that started with a complaint filed by atheist Alain Simoneau and the Mouvement laïque québécois against Saguenay, QC Mayor Jean Tremblay.

In the 1994 case of M.A.B., W.A.T. and J.-A.Y.T. versus Canada, the United Nations Human Rights Committee ruled that there are limits to what kind of belief can be understood as religion within the frames of human rights. The so-called Assembly of the Church of the Universe did not succeed in claiming that the Canadian authorities had violated their freedom of religion because they had been arrested for selling marijuana, which for them was their holy sacrament. The committee found instead that the entire faith community appeared to be constructed solely to circumvent Canada’s then comprehensive prohibition against narcotics. The committee concluded that “a belief consisting primarily or exclusively in the worship and distribution of a narcotic drug cannot conceivably be brought within the scope of article 18 of the Covenant,” and as such did not qualify as a religion.

== Reasonable accommodation on religious grounds ==
=== Legal basis ===
Equality of all individuals is guaranteed by Section Fifteen of the Canadian Charter of Rights and Freedoms. This section promotes the pursuance of equality and the refusal of discrimination under enumerated or analogous grounds. However, the charter only protects individuals from actions, policies and norms of public entities, not from private persons and organizations.

Section 15 of the Charter states:

15. (1) Every individual is equal before and under the law and has the right to the equal protection and equal benefit of the law without discrimination and, in particular, without discrimination based on race, national or ethnic origin, colour, religion, sex, age or mental or physical disability.
(2) Subsection (1) does not preclude any law, program or activity that has as its object the amelioration of conditions of disadvantaged individuals or groups including those that are disadvantaged because of race, national or ethnic origin, colour, religion, sex, age or mental or physical disability.

To enlarge the scope of protection, the Canadian Human Rights Act (CHRA) in section 3(1) forbids discrimination on prohibited grounds by actors that fall under federal jurisdiction, such as television, and federally regulated industries.

Canadian provinces have their own human rights legislations that can be explicit as to the notion of reasonable accommodation. In Manitoba, section 9(1)(d) of the Human Rights Code defines discrimination as a "failure to make reasonable accommodation for the special needs of any individual or group if those special needs are based upon" prohibited grounds. These provincial legislations oblige actors under their jurisdiction (employers, service providers and landlords) to respect the duty to accommodate, to preserve a multicultural society.

The particularity of the duty to accommodate on religious grounds is that cases fall both under the jurisdiction of the Charter and other federal and provincial human rights acts and that they challenge the notions of social values, secularism and gender equality.

=== Definition ===
The notion of reasonable accommodation is a judicial creation. It implies that "federal/provincial/territorial anti-discrimination measures place a positive duty on employers, service providers and landlords [...] to accommodate people's needs for reasons associated with recognized discriminatory grounds." According to Sandra Fredman, the duty of reasonable accommodation "represents and advance towards substantive equality" for three reasons. Firstly, "equality is explicitly asymmetric, aiming to redress disadvantage even if this entails different or more favourable treatment." Secondly, it is focused "on modifying the environment to facilitate the participation of those affected." Finally, "[it] goes beyond other conceptions of equality in that it expressly imposes a positive duty to make changes."

The notion of reasonable accommodation is directly related to the freedom of religion. Indeed, in 2006, "the Multani decision [...] moved reasonable accommodation from the realm of employment law into a broader legal discourse on religious freedom more generally."

In claims concerning discrimination on religious grounds, the burden of proof shifts to the employer, landlord or service provider who has to prove the two elements: (1) that the rule is necessary and (2) he accommodates the individual to the point of undue hardship.

=== Limits ===
The duty of reasonable accommodation on religious grounds experiences some limits, because all rights are not absolutes. Indeed, reasonable accommodation requires a balance between the rights of the claimant and the holder of the duty to accommodate.

The main limit to the duty to accommodate that is included in the CHRA is the notion of undue hardship. It signifies that the discriminatory practice can be justified if the duty holder demonstrates that the required accommodation weights too much on him. The undue hardship includes "health, safety and cost." Professor Christian Brunelle divides the evaluation criteria in three categories: the limits of financial and material resources of the company/institution, the breach of the victim's rights, and the proper functioning of the company/institution. The judge also takes into account the reasonable feature of the controversial policy, rule or norm, the effort of accommodation by the duty holder, and the excessive feature of the constraint. Courts generally agree that the complainant has to take steps towards accommodation or "must either sacrifice his religious principles or his employment".

In Alberta v. Hutterian Brethren of Wilson Colony, the Supreme Court of Canada addressed whether the obligation to have a photograph on the driver's license violated the Hutterites' right to freedom of religion. The Court found that there was a prima facie discrimination but considered that the need to both protect the integrity of the licensing system and combat identity fraud was a justified limitation on the community's religious freedom. This decision illustrates another limit to reasonable accommodation: public interest. The Court explains that "[g]iving effect to each of their religious claims could seriously undermine the universality of many regulatory programs [...] to the overall detriment of the community."

=== Impacts ===
The duty of reasonable accommodation has a major impact on the promotion of multiculturalism protected under Section Twenty-seven of the Canadian Charter of Rights and Freedoms. Professor Errol P. Mendes suggests that reasonable accommodation is part of the "Canadian paradigm", in contradistinction with the French "laïcité."

Besides the cases brought to courts, there are many examples of reasonable accommodation negotiated in a non-judiciary context. One example is the decision of the Royal Canadian Mounted Police (RCMP) to allow Sikh adherents to wear religious signs when serving the RCMP (e.g. the turban, the beard and the dagger.) The federal court decided that this decision did not infringe the Charter.

Other illustrations exist. It is the case of some municipalities that decided that the public swimming pool should be separated between men and women 3 hours a week (1h30 each) to accommodate observant Muslims. It was also brought up with the decision of the Quebec Soccer Federation to lift the prohibition on Sikh head coverings.

The duty of reasonable accommodation presents particular issues in the province of Quebec. Some describe it as a "subject of high controversy" and as threatening "the collective values chosen by Quebecers to govern their collective existence". Surveys showed that 71.7% of Quebecers whose mother tongue is French found today's society "overly tolerant of accommodation", whereas only 35.2% of Quebecers having another mother tongue shared this opinion.

== Specific freedoms ==
=== Religious speech ===
In a 1985 Supreme Court case involving the Lord's Day Act, R. v. Big M Drug Mart Ltd., Chief Justice Brian Dickson said that religious freedom in Canada includes freedom of religious speech, including "the right to entertain such religious beliefs as a person chooses, the right to declare religious beliefs openly and without fear of hindrance or reprisal, and the right to manifest religious belief by worship and practice or by teaching and dissemination."

Canada has laws prohibiting the promotion of hatred against sections of the public distinguished by colour, race, religion, ethnic origin, or sexual orientation. However, there are exemptions in the Bill which permit the expression of opinions on religious subjects and opinions based on religious texts which would otherwise be prohibited.

In 1996, the Supreme Court of Canada held that the anti-Semitic publications of a New Brunswick schoolteacher, challenged under the province's Human Rights Act, were protected by his right to freedom of religion, but that professional sanctions were a reasonable limit on that right, to maintain "a school system that is free from bias, prejudice and intolerance."

In 1997, Hugh Owens, a Saskatchewan prison guard, published an advertisement in the Star-Phoenix that referenced Bible verses related to homosexuality (without quoting them) and drew a line through an image representing a gay couple. A complaint was lodged with the Saskatchewan Human Rights Board of Inquiry. The board ruled against Owens and that decision was also upheld by a lower court. On April 13, 2006 the Saskatchewan Court of Appeal overturned the previous decisions, ruling that while Owens's advertisement was "offensive and jarring to many", it was not illegal. The court also ruled that statements which are designed to provoke "extreme emotions and strong feelings of detestation, calumny and vilification" may be deemed as hate speech.

In 2000, Rev. Ken Campbell successfully defended against an Ontario Human Rights Commission complaint filed after he placed an advertisement in The Globe and Mail newspaper where he protested a Supreme Court of Canada ruling calling for Alberta to amend the Human Rights Code regarding LGBT issues. The ad began with "Supreme Court has no business imposing 'bathhouse morality' on the churches and in the living rooms of the nation." Two years later he successfully defended against a complaint filed at the BC Human Rights Tribunal for the same advertisement, with the decision stating "The essence of Mr. Campbell's defence is that the publication... is an expression of his Charter-protected rights to express his religious beliefs; that is, a finding of discrimination would impair both his freedom of expression and his freedom of religion."

Another high-profile case involves Chris Kempling, a school teacher, who was suspended without pay in 2002 for writing letters to a local newspaper objecting to the introduction of LGBT-related material into the public school system, arguing against same-sex marriage, and advocating conversion therapy for gay and lesbian persons. Kempling appealed the suspension to the courts. The British Columbia Court of Appeal found that his right to freedom of expression had been breached, but that the disciplinary action was a reasonable limit on his rights, as it was done with the objective of maintaining a tolerant and non-discriminatory school system.

=== Sabbath and holiday observance ===
In R. v. Big M Drug Mart, the Supreme Court of Canada held that the stated purpose of the federal Lord's Day Act, compelling observance of the Christian Sabbath, was incompatible with the protections of freedom of religion in the Charter. In 1986, in R v Edwards Books and Art Ltd, the Supreme Court found that legislation prohibiting Sunday shopping with the secular purpose of creating a day of rest was also a violation of freedom of religion because of the unequal effect of the law on retailers who observed a different sabbath. However, this violation was upheld as a justifiable limit on freedom of religion.

The Supreme Court of Canada has ruled that there is a duty to accommodate religious observance under human rights legislation. The 1990 case Central Alberta Dairy Pool v. Alberta concerned an employee who was required by his religion to take Easter Monday as a holy day. As this is not a statutory holiday, his employer required that he work that day or lose his job. The Supreme Court of Canada found that the employer should have accommodated the employee's religious practices.

In a series of ongoing legal cases (Beaudoin v. British Columbia, Trinity Bible Chapel v. Ontario, and Gateway Bible Baptist Church v. Manitoba), courts have consistently decided that the provincial public health orders that prohibited in-person religious worship services in the face of the COVID-19 pandemic infringed on the freedom of religion. However, these courts ruled that this constitutional infringement was permissible in a "free and democratic society."

=== Religious dress ===
In a 1985 court case involving an employee of the Canadian National Railway, K.S. Bhinder, a Sikh whose religion required that he wear a turban, lost his challenge of the CNR policy that required him to wear a hard hat. In the 1990 case of Central Alberta Dairy Pool, the Supreme Court of Canada overturned the 1985 Bhinder decision, saying: "An employer that has not adopted a policy with respect to accommodation and cannot otherwise satisfy the trier of fact that individual accommodation would result in undue hardship will be required to justify his conduct with respect to the individual complainant. Even then the employer can invoke the BFOQ (bona fide occupational qualification) defence." In the 1991 case of Peel Board of Education v. Ontario Human Rights Commission, an Ontario school board's "zero tolerance" for weapons in its schools had an adverse impact on Khalsa Sikh men who are required by their religion to carry a kirpan, a ceremonial dagger. A Khalsa Sikh teacher brought a complaint under the Ontario Human Rights Code and was successful. The school board challenged this to the Ontario Divisional Court on the basis that there was a threat to public safety. The Divisional Court ruled that the threat to public safety from Sikhs was minimal and the discriminatory impact of the ruling on this religious group was significant. In 2006, the Supreme Court of Canada ruled in Multani v. Commission scolaire Marguerite‑Bourgeoys that Sikh children can wear a kirpan to school based on freedom of religion.

In 1995, the Federal Court of Appeal upheld the exemption for Sikhs from wearing the "Mountie hat" as part of the RCMP dress requirements.

In 2019, Quebec passed an Act respecting the laicity of the State that forbids public officials from wearing religious symbols or garb on the job and denies public services to those wearing religious dress. The Superior Court of Quebec has held parts of this statute are unconstitutional, but has upheld most of it because the Quebec government invoked the notwithstanding clause of the charter, which temporarily allows some constitutional rights and freedoms to be overridden. The case is on appeal to the Quebec Court of Appeal.

In 2026, Quebec passed Bill 9 that expands on its secularism law Bill 21. It bans wearing religious symbols for daycare workers and prayer spaces in public institutions.

=== Marital practice ===
Prior to 1798, only ministers of the Church of England had the authority to solemnize legal marriages in Upper Canada. This power was extended by degrees to religious officials of various other Christian denominations over the first half of the 19th century, until an 1857 act granted the power to solemnize marriages to the ministers of every religious denomination. A similar process occurred in Lower Canada, with the main difference being that it was the Roman Catholic Church which initially held the sole authority.

Polygamous marriages, promoted by some religious minority groups, are illegal in Canada. Authorities often do not strictly enforce the applicable laws, as has been the case in Bountiful, British Columbia. On January 12, 2006, the Department of Justice (Canada) released a study, authored by three law professors at Queen's University, recommending that Canada repeal the laws that make polygamy a criminal offence. See related article, Polygamy and religion.

In the 2003 case Halpern et al. v. Attorney General of Canada et al., the Ontario Court of Appeal rejected the argument that a failure of the law to recognize same-sex marriages violated the religious rights of the church that performed the ceremonies, though the court found the definition of marriage to be unconstitutional on other grounds.

=== Refusal of service ===
In 2000, a Board of Inquiry appointed under the Ontario Human Rights Code found that Scott Brockie, a Toronto printer, had discriminated on the basis of sexual orientation by refusing to print letterhead, envelopes, and business cards for the Canadian Lesbian and Gay Archives. The Board of Inquiry ordered Brockie to pay damages of $5,000 to the two complainants who had brought the complaint. Brockie unsuccessfully appealed to Ontario Superior Court (Divisional Court) to overturn the decision. The divisional court ruled that the order requiring Brockie to print the materials was a justifiable violation of Brockie's religious rights. However, the court limited the scope of the Board of Inquiry's ruling to only ordinary material such as letterhead and envelopes. The court said the Board of Inquiry's order "ought not to require Mr. Brockie to print material of a nature that could reasonably be considered to be in direct conflict with the core elements of his religious beliefs."

In 2002, the Rainbow Harmony Project, a choir that supports LGBT persons, filed a complaint against Camp Arnes of Manitoba, after the camp denied them access. The complaint was settled, with both parties issuing a joint statement that the conflict had resulted from uncertainty regarding that nature of the camp's rental operations, and the acknowledgement that they were "part of its broader religious mission and outreach and not primarily a commercial activity."

Court rulings in Saskatchewan have held that religious-based objections of provincial marriage commissioners to same-sex marriage do not need to be accommodated, because refusal by a government-appointed marriage commissioner to perform same-sex marriages would constitute a violation of the Charter equality rights of gay and lesbian individuals. In 2008, the Saskatchewan Human Rights Tribunal held that marriage commissioner Orville Nichols had discriminated against a same-sex couple by refusing to perform their marriage ceremony. The tribunal ordered him to pay $2,500 in compensation to the couple. In 2009, the Saskatchewan Court of Queen's Bench upheld the tribunal's decision. In response to a reference question from the Government of Saskatchewan, the Saskatchewan Court of Appeal ruled in 2011 that two proposed bills which would have permitted marriage commissioners to refuse to perform same-sex marriages because of religious objections would be unconstitutional. Ordained religious ministers in Canada are not required to marry same-sex couples. A poll conducted in October 2006 found that 57% of Canadians believe that a marriage commissioner should be able to refuse to officiate at a gay wedding so long as there are enough marriage commissioners available, and 72% felt that clergy should have the right to refuse to officiate if doing so would violate his or her religious beliefs.

=== Refusal of medical treatment ===
A set of Jehovah's Witness parents refused blood transfusions for their one-year-old daughter after doctors decided the baby urgently needed them. The baby was made a ward of the state to administer blood transfusions. The Supreme Court of Canada ruled that this was a legitimate limitation on religious freedom.

=== Persecution of religious minorities ===
The Hindu Samaj temple in Hamilton, Ontario was burned down on Sept. 15, 2001. The arson of the temple took place after the September 11 (9/11) attack. According to the reports, the criminals mistaken a Hindu temple for a Mosque, however, their original intention was to burn a Mosque. The burn down also destroyed the sacred religious icons within, caused $500,000 in damage. Hamilton Police Chief Glenn De Caire described the arson attack on the Hindu temple as a 'hate crime'. According to Neelam Tandon, a temple member who organized a 2001 fundraiser to rebuild the temple, even years after the temple burning, her vehicle at her Ancaster home was repeatedly vandalized. The Hamilton police says that, it took 12 years to charge three people with the temple fire, and all three were sentenced to three years probation and 80 hours of community service, as well as ordered to make $10,000 donation to a charity of their choice.

=== Other case law ===
In 2004, Robert Allen lost a case he brought against the Council for the Corporation of the County of Renfrew, where Allen attempted to prevent the council from opening each meeting with a prayer. The court found in favour of the council.

In the 2004 case Syndicat Northcrest v. Amselem, the Supreme Court of Canada ruled in favour of Jews seeking to build a sukkah despite a condominium agreement that prohibited the action.

=== Use of Ayahuasca in Santo Daime Church ===
In June 2017 the Santo Daime Church Céu do Montréal received religious exemption to use Ayahuasca as a sacrament in their rituals.

== Education ==
Canada's approach to religious education often faces concerns addressing to how to best balance competing concerns, e.g., anti-discrimination laws and religious freedoms, and respect rights to religious education outlined in important Canadian legal documents.

In April 2023, Bernard Drainville Quebec Minister of Education announced plans to ban prayer in all provincial public schools.

=== Public funding ===
In some provinces and territories, public funding for religious-based separate schools, either Roman Catholic or Protestant, is mandated by section 93 of the Canadian Constitution and reaffirmed by Canadian Charter of Rights and Freedoms. The United Nations declared in 1999 that Ontario was in violation of the International Covenant on Civil and Political Rights by exclusively funding Catholic schools over other faith-based schools. In 2007, an Ontario poll conducted by the Strategic Council showed that 71% of people were opposed to expanding faith based funding to non-Catholic religions.

Quebec was originally required by the Constitution to provide public funding for confessional schools, but in 1997 a constitutional amendment was passed withdrawing the confessional nature of public schools. The Quebec Education Act was then amended to reflect the constitutional changes and on July 1, 1998, the changes took effect.

In 1998 Newfoundland similarly abolished the constitutional requirement for confessional based funding.

=== Homosexuality ===
In 2001, the Supreme Court of Canada ruled in Trinity Western University v. British Columbia College of Teachers that the British Columbia College of Teachers was wrong to withhold accreditation of Trinity Western University's teacher education program on the basis that the school's policy prohibited "homosexual behaviour". A decade and a half later, the court reversed its ruling and upheld provincial law societies' denial to accredit Trinity Western University's proposed law program.

In a highly publicized 2002 case, Justice Robert McKinnon granted an interlocutory injunction ordering that Marc Hall be allowed to bring a same-sex date to prom at his Oshawa, Ontario Catholic high school. The matter did not, however, proceed to trial, meaning no binding judgment on the merits of the case was issued.

=== Mandating opposing curricula ===
In 2006, the Province of British Columbia moved to make changes that would require religious schools to teach LGBT-friendly educational material; however, the British Columbia government indicated that changes to the public education system were not intended to prevent religious schools from teaching their ethical codes of behaviour.

In 2006, an independent Christian Evangelical school in Quebec was ordered by its school board to teach Darwin's theory of evolution and a comprehensive sex education program, a requirement that does not exist in some other provinces. In response, the Quebec Ministry of Education negotiated with an unspecified number of Evangelical schools on a working curriculum that would not violate the basic legal educational requirements.

=== Loyola High School v Quebec (Attorney General) ===
In 2008 Paul Donovan, the principal of a Jesuit catholic high school in Quebec, objected to a government mandated course on religion and ethics. The ethics and religious culture course, ERC as it is called, is a provincially mandated course that requires schools to teach the basic traditions and symbolisms of a variety of religions.

Donovan argued on behalf of Loyola High School that the ERC forbids teachers from teaching, in detail, the reasons why a given religious faith believes what it does believe; any form of instruction that could be perceived as an endorsement of a particular religion or proclaiming it as truth is prohibited and therefore seen by Donovan as a violation of religious freedom, as outlined in the Quebec Charter of Values. An additional concern is that government imposed religious and ethical curricula on institutions like Loyola, could be precedent-setting for government control on other faith based institutions such as churches and associated religious organizations.

All schools in Quebec, including religious, private schools, and home schools are obliged by the law to offer the ERC. If faith based schools want to continue their traditional faith education, they are permitted to do so, however it must be in addition to but separate from the ERC. This is viewed by the law's opponents as closed secularism, as opposed to open secularism, and a perversion of the proper understanding of pluralism and, of most concern, a breach of their right to teach the faith.

A Quebec Superior Court agreed with the school's position in 2010, but in 2012 an appellate court sided with the government. On further appeal the Supreme Court of Canada held that the Minister's decision to force the teaching of Catholicism from a neutral standpoint unreasonably violated religious freedom, and was sent back to the minister for reconsideration.

== See also ==
- Human rights in Canada
- History of freedom of religion in Canada
- Religion in Canada
- Multiculturalism in Canada
- Office of Religious Freedom
- History of Seventh-day Adventist freedom of religion in Canada
- Trinity Western University § Controversies and court cases
- Act respecting the laicity of the State
- Artur Pawlowski
