= Syndicat Northcrest v Amselem =

- Supreme Court of Canada

Hearing: Argued January 19, 2004 Judgment: June 30, 2004
- Full case name: Moïse Amselem, Gladys Bouhadana, Antal Klein and Gabriel Fonfeder v Syndicat Northcrest; League for Human Rights of B'Nai Brith Canada v Syndicat Northcrest
- Citations: [2004] 2 S.C.R. 551; 2004 SCC 47 (CanLII); (2004), 241 D.L.R. (4th) 1; (2004), 121 C.R.R. (2d) 189
- Prior history: Judgment for Syndicat Northcrest in the Court of Appeal for Quebec.

Holding
- Sukkahs may be built if connected to the religious beliefs of individuals; conflicting property and security rights were marginally impaired and thus do not outweigh freedom of religion under the Quebec Charter of Human Rights and Freedoms.

Court membership
- Chief Justice: Beverley McLachlin; Puisne Justices: Frank Iacobucci, John C. Major, Michel Bastarache, Ian Binnie, Louise Arbour, Louis LeBel, Marie Deschamps, Morris Fish

Reasons given
- Majority: Iacobucci J., joined by McLachlin, Major, Arbour and Fish JJ.
- Dissent: Bastarache J., joined by LeBel and Deschamps JJ.
- Dissent: Binnie J.

Syndicat Northcrest v Amselem [2004] 2 S.C.R. 551, 2004 SCC 47 was a decision of the Supreme Court of Canada that attempted to define freedom of religion under the Quebec Charter of Human Rights and Freedoms and section 2 of the Canadian Charter of Rights and Freedoms. Although the Supreme Court split on their definition, the majority advocated tolerating a practice where the individual sincerely feels it is connected to religion, regardless of whether the practice is required by a religious authority.

== Background ==
The case arose after Moïse Amselem, his youngest son David, and René Elhadad, in Montreal erected sukkahs on their balconies in a residential building which they owned. Sukkahs are small dwellings in which Jews live during Sukkot, a Jewish holiday, in accordance with the Hebrew Bible. However, those who managed the buildings, Syndicat Northcrest, claimed the sukkahs violated by-laws forbidding structures to be built on the balconies. The Orthodox Jews had not seen this requirement as applying to religious requirements because Christmas decorations and the like were allowed. Syndicat Northcrest denied all requests that sukkahs be built, except one to be shared but this did not however meet minimal Jewish Halachic requirements. Consequently, an injunction by Syndicat Northcrest was filed against further sukkahs.

While there was no government action responsible for violating a right, the Quebec Charter is of relevance to personal disputes. As Justice Michel Bastarache wrote, "the first paragraph of s. 9.1 [of the Quebec Charter], insofar as it does not require that the infringement of a right or freedom result from the application of the law, applies only to private law relationships, that is, to infringements of the rights and freedoms of private individuals by other private individuals." Bastarache noted this is what occurred in a previous case, Aubry v Éditions Vice-Versa Inc (1998).

== Decision ==
The majority decision was written by Justice Frank Iacobucci. He examined whether the by-laws violated the freedom of religion of the Orthodox Jews, and whether Syndicat Northcrest's opposition to the sukkahs was protected by rights to enjoy property under the Quebec Charter. Iacobucci first attempted to define freedom of religion, and started by giving a legal definition for religion. He decided that religion is a thorough set of beliefs regarding a higher power, tied with a person's view of him or herself and his/her needs to realize spiritual completeness. Iacobucci went on to note that in past freedom of religion cases, such as R v Big M Drug Mart Ltd (1985), the Supreme Court has advocated giving freedom of religion a large and liberal definition emphasizing individual rights. In Big M, it was noted there should be respect for religious diversity and no coercion to do something in violation of one's religion. A journal article was then cited to establish this precedent favoured an individual's view of religion to an organized church's. Thus, anyone who claims rights to freedom of religion does not need to demonstrate that they were denied rights to worship in accordance with the manner required by a religious authority. Following R v Edwards Books Ltd and R v Jones, it was enough to demonstrate an individual religious belief. These arguments were reinforced by a desire that secular governments and courts should not judge which religious practices are needed and which are not; this was to make legal decisions regarding moral beliefs. Still, practices required by a religious authority are also protected; what matters is that the practice is connected to a religious belief.

To determine whether an individual belief is sincere, the Court noted US case law, which advocated a minimally intrusive evaluation of an individual's beliefs. Courts must only determine that a belief is not feigned and religious claims are made in good faith. It must be asked whether an individual's testimony can be believed, and how one belief fits in with others held by the individual. In this, the Supreme Court added that courts should tolerate a change in beliefs; the individual's beliefs held in the past are not relevant to those claimed in the present.

The court will determine whether a sufficiently large violation of freedom of religion has occurred to raise challenges under the Quebec and Canadian Charters. The gravity of the violations will have to be evaluated on a case-by-case basis. However, in this case the Supreme Court noted freedom of religion should not work to deny the rights of others.

Turning back to this case, the Supreme Court observed Syndicat Northcrest had argued freedom of religion was limited here by rights to enjoy property and to personal security. However, the Court found the rights of the Orthodox Jews had been severely infringed, while Syndicat Northcrest's rights were not significantly affected. Thus, freedom of religion would prevail. The trial judge had found at least one of the Orthodox Jews sincerely believed he needed a sukkah, while the others seemed not to because they did not have sukkahs in the past. The Supreme Court rejected the latter finding, because it relied on a study of past practice. The Supreme Court also noted the Jews might have wanted sukkahs for religious reasons, regardless of whether they were necessary; this also undermined the view that past practices should be studied. The Court then decided the violation of religious freedom was serious because the right to an individual sukkah was not limited but denied completely.

Conversely, Syndicat Northcrest claimed that the sukkahs limited rights to enjoy property because the sukkahs could take away from the attractiveness of the building and its financial value. Rights to personal security were claimed because the sukkahs might block off fire escapes. The Court was unconvinced the property value would drop because of lack of evidence, and the attractiveness of the building for nine days every year was held to be a small issue, especially in the context of the importance of multiculturalism. The Court also noted the Jews had offered to mind fire safety. Regarding the argument that the Jews had waived their rights, Iacobucci noted it was still not certain whether constitutional rights can be waived. If they can, the waiver should be more explicit and done under complete free will. The Jews in this case did not have complete free will in their agreement because they wanted to live in those buildings.

== Dissent ==
=== Bastarache ===
A dissent was written by Justice Bastarache. He interpreted past freedom of religion case law as meaning the right protects religious beliefs and practices that result from those beliefs. Beliefs can be discovered through religious rules; these distinguish religion from personal activities. Thus, a belief is not held individually but is shared. This provided an objective approach to freedom of religion. Expert testimony would be a great help in finding whether a belief is religious. Next, the sincerity of the individual is studied, in a non-intrusive way. Bastarache felt for most of the Jews in this case, the religion required eating in a sukkah, but an individual sukkah was not needed. While Bastarache noted one Jew might have a right to an individual sukkah, this needed to be balanced against "proper regard for democratic values, public order and the general well-being of the citizens of Québec", as required by the Quebec Charter. The property and safety rights thus entered consideration. Bastarache wrote that "it is difficult to imagine how granting a right of way in emergency situations, which is essential to the safety of all the occupants of the co-owned property, could fail to justify the prohibition against setting up sukkahs, especially in light of the compromise proposed by the respondent."

=== Binnie ===
Justice Ian Binnie also wrote a dissent. He observed the oddness of the situation, namely that a right was being claimed against other owners of the building and not a government. The owners had made agreements that would prohibit the sukkahs. Binnie emphasized the importance of this agreement or contract.

== See also ==
- List of Supreme Court of Canada cases (McLachlin Court)
- History of the Jews in Canada
- Status of religious freedom in Canada
- Multani v Commission scolaire Marguerite‑Bourgeoys
