= History of freedom of religion in Canada =

Freedom of religion is a constitutionally protected right in Canada, allowing believers the freedom to assemble and worship without limitation or interference, but it was not always so.

== Timeline ==
- 1623, Sir George Calvert, Charter of Avalon
- 1763, the Treaty of Paris
- 1774, Quebec Act of 1774
- 1851: The Freedom of Worship Act, R.S.Q. c. L-2
- 1867: The British North America Act, 1867.
- 1894–1947: attendance mandatory at Indian residential school system (a network of boarding schools) for Indigenous peoples to Christianize the aboriginal people of Canada thereby replacing their indigenous religious beliefs, practices and spiritual leaders.
- 1947: Saskatchewan Bill of Rights, the first Bill of Rights enacted in the British Commonwealth since the original English Bill of Rights of 1688; it was followed by human rights codes in other provinces and territories of Canada
- 1962: Ontario Human Rights Code
- 1963: Canadian Bill of Rights
- 1969: Walter v Alberta (AG) is decided by the Supreme Court of Canada, upholding the Communal Property Act.
- 1977: Canadian Human Rights Act
- 1982: the Canadian Charter of Rights and Freedoms
- late 1980s and early 1990s: religious communities issued their first apologies for their respective roles in the residential school system.
- 2008: Prime Minister Stephen Harper offered the first public apology on behalf of the Government of Canada and the leaders of the other federal parties in the House of Commons. Nine days prior, the Truth and Reconciliation Commission (TRC) was established

=== Sunday observance ===
- 1625: The Sunday Observance Act 1625
- 1627: An Act for the further reformation of sundry abuses committed on the Lord's Day commonly called Sunday (UK)
- 1677: The Sunday Observance Act 1677
- 1888: Lord's Day Alliance established.
- 1897: Ontario Court of Appeal ruled in favour of the Hamilton Street Railway Company's Sunday operations.
- 1906: An Act Respecting the Lord's Day
- 1952: Lord's Day Act, R.S.C. 1952, c. 171, s. 4.
- 1961: Lewis E. Gordon, owner of a coin-operated laundry business, held in violation of the Lord's Day Act by the Supreme Court of Canada.
- 1985: R v Big M Drug Mart Ltd is decided by the Supreme Court of Canada, finding that the Lord's Day Act unconstitutional.

== Legal protections ==
1609, Sir George Calvert purchased a tract of land in Newfoundland from Sir William Vaughan (1575–1641). He named the area of the peninsula as Avalon, after the legendary spot where Christianity was supposedly introduced to Roman Britain in ancient times. The plantation lay on what is now the Avalon Peninsula and included the fishing station at "Ferryland". In 1623, Calvert was granted a Royal Charter by James VI and I extending the Royal lands and granting them the name the province of Avalon and guaranteeing complete religious toleration.

On February 10, 1763, the Treaty of Paris put an end to the Seven Years' War between Britain and France. The Treaty allowed the people of Quebec to practice their Roman Catholic religion. Paragraph IV of the Treaty reads:

...His Britannick Majesty, on his side, agrees to grant the liberty of the Catholic religion to the inhabitants of Canada: he will, in consequence, give the most precise and most effectual orders, that his new Roman Catholic subjects may profess the worship of their religion according to the rites of the Romish church, as far as the laws of Great Britain permit...

In 1851, the Parliament of the Province of Canada enacted the Freedom of Worship Act. The Act gave legal protection to the "free exercise and enjoyment of religious profession and worship, without discrimination or preference" in what is now Ontario and Quebec.

At Confederation in 1867, the Constitution Act, 1867 protected the right to publicly funded denominational and separate schools, as they existed prior to Confederation. This guarantee originally applied primarily in Ontario and Quebec, but subsequently provided similar protections in the provinces of Alberta, Saskatchewan and Newfoundland.

In 1953, in the Supreme Court of Canada decision Saumur v. City of Quebec, Justice Rand summarized the judicial history of religious freedom in Canada:

From 1760, therefore, to the present moment religious freedom has, in our legal system, been recognized as a principle of fundamental character; and although we have nothing in the nature of an established church, that the untrammelled affirmations of religious belief and its propagation, personal or institutional, remain as of the greatest constitutional significance throughout the Dominion is unquestionable...

Following World War II, there was a general movement in Canada to provide greater legislative protection for fundamental freedoms, including freedom of religion. The first example was the Saskatchewan Bill of Rights of 1947, the first Bill of Rights enacted in the British Commonwealth since the original English Bill of Rights of 1688. The Saskatchewan Bill of Rights provided express statutory protection for the exercise of freedom of religion, in matters coming within provincial jurisdiction. Other provinces passed similar legislation, such as the Ontario Human Rights Code in 1962. The federal Parliament enacted the Canadian Bill of Rights in 1963, which protected freedom of religion in matters coming within federal jurisdiction. The federal Parliament followed up by enacting the Canadian Human Rights Act in 1977, to prohibit discrimination on a wide range of personal characteristics, including protecting religion.

Finally, in 1982, the Canadian Charter of Rights and Freedoms was enacted as part of the Constitution of Canada. Section 2 of the Charter protects fundamental freedoms, including "freedom of conscience and religion."

== Sunday observance ==
=== 1906, The Lord's Day Act ===
(See below for photo text of the 1906 Lord's Day Act)

The Lord's Day Act, which since 1906 had prohibited business transactions from taking place on Sundays, was struck down as unconstitutional in the 1985 case R. v. Big M Drug Mart Ltd. Calgary police officers witnessed several transactions at the Big M Drug Mart, all of which occurred on a Sunday. Big M was charged with a violation of the Lord's Day Act. A provincial court ruled that the Lord's Day Act was unconstitutional, but the Crown proceeded to appeal all the way to the Supreme Court of Canada. In a unanimous 6-0 decision, the Lord's Day Act was ruled an infringement of the freedom of conscience and religion defined in section 2(a) of the Charter of Rights and Freedoms.

In 1888, the Lord's Day Alliance came into existence as the result mainly of Presbyterian and Methodist interests. Leading up to 1906, the Lord's Day Alliance advocated the national Lord's Day Bill. They were opposed by Roman Catholics and Anglicans.

The Quebec government opposed it as well. Under Henri Bourassa's leadership, Quebec argued for the rights of conscience and provincial autonomy in the Lord's Day debate of 1906. The Roman Catholic Church supported Sunday as a day to attend the Mass and as a day to enjoy the simple, if not secular, benefits of a day off from work. This contrasted sharply with the strict sabbatarian ideas of the Presbyterian denomination.

Quebec Roman Catholic members of parliament sponsored an amendment that gave the administration of the 1906 Lord's Day Act to the Attorney-General of each province. Just before the federal Act came into effect in 1907, Quebec passed a provincial law that guaranteed individuals such as Jews and Seventh-Day Adventists the right to work on Sunday if they observed some other day. This support for minority groups did not last. During the 1920s, Roman Catholics renewed their support for Sunday observance.

==== Ligue du Dimanche ====
The bishops had also given the signal that the time for study was over. An ad hoc committee in the city of Quebec then successfully prosecuted Sunday theatres.9 To coordinate the ad hoc prosecutions, on 16 April 1923, Archambault brought fifty people together in the basement of the Gesù, the Jesuit parish church in downtown Montreal. Representatives of the main Montreal Catholic societies, many of them former retreatants, attended. For example, the Union Catholique, the Saint-Vincent-de-Paul Society, the Association Catholique des Voyageurs de Commerce, Catholic unions, the Association Catholique de la Jeunesse Canadienne-française, the Ligue d'Action Française, and the Saint-Jean-Baptiste Society were represented. It seemed as if the who's who of Quebec's Catholic lay people had come. A constitution for the new Ligue du Dimanche, drafted by Archambault, was approved and so the Ligue du Dimanche was born.

=== Organized labour ===
Sunday-closing laws provided an enforced day of rest for many workers. In English Canada, the Presbyterian Church led the way in advocating laws supporting Sunday as a strict, religious day of rest. They did not seek an alliance with labour on this, though, labour movements and the Presbyterians shared a common interest. The alliance between religion and labour in Quebec found its reality in the work of Archambault.

Wholesale and retail merchants had little desire to expand their work week to seven days and thereby run the risk of increasing costs by spreading the same volume of sales over a longer period of time. To these men, the guarantee of Sunday as a weekly rest day reduced the threat of competition for the consumer's dollar."

=== Seventh-day Adventists ===
Canadian Seventh-day Adventists saw apocalyptic foreshadowing in the efforts to establish a national Sunday law. Seventh-day Adventists teach that the command to worship the image to the beast found in Revelation 13 predicts Sunday observance legislation at the end of the Earth's history:

13:11 Then I saw another beast coming up out of the earth, and he had two horns like a lamb and spoke like a dragon. 12 And he exercises all the authority of the first beast in his presence, and causes the earth and those who dwell in it to worship the first beast, whose deadly wound was healed. 13 He performs great signs, so that he even makes fire come down from heaven on the earth in the sight of men. 14 And he deceives those who dwell on the earth by those signs which he was granted to do in the sight of the beast, telling those who dwell on the earth to make an image to the beast who was wounded by the sword and lived. 15 He was granted power to give breath to the image of the beast, that the image of the beast should both speak and cause as many as would not worship the image of the beast to be killed. 16 He causes all, both small and great, rich and poor, free and slave, to receive a mark on their right hand or on their foreheads, 17 and that no one may buy or sell except one who has the mark or the name of the beast, or the number of his name."

== Military service ==
In Canada, the majority of the Conscientious Objectors came from the pacifist churches such as the Mennonites, Quakers, Doukhobors, Hutterites and Tunkers.

== Indigenous Canadians and Indian residential schools ==
One of the main goals of the Indian residential schools of Canada was to Christianize the aboriginal people of Canada thereby replacing their indigenous religious beliefs, practices and spiritual leaders.

In Canada, the Indian residential school system was a network of boarding schools for Indigenous peoples. Attendance was mandatory from 1894 to 1947. The network was funded by the Canadian government's Department of Indian Affairs and administered by Christian churches. The school system was created to isolate Indigenous children from the influence of their own native culture and religion in order to assimilate them into the dominant Canadian culture. Over the course of the system's more-than-hundred-year existence, around 150,000 children were placed in residential schools nationally. By the 1930s about 30 percent of Indigenous children were believed to be attending residential schools. The number of school-related deaths remains unknown due to incomplete records. Estimates range from 3,200 to over 30,000.

While religious communities issued their first apologies for their respective roles in the residential school system in the late 1980s and early 1990s, on June 11, 2008, Prime Minister Stephen Harper offered the first public apology on behalf of the Government of Canada and the leaders of the other federal parties in the House of Commons. Nine days prior, the Truth and Reconciliation Commission (TRC) was established to uncover the truth about the schools. The commission gathered about 7,000 statements from residential school survivors through public and private meetings at various local, regional and national events across Canada. Seven national events held between 2008 and 2013 commemorated the experience of former students of residential schools. In 2015, the TRC concluded with the establishment of the National Centre for Truth and Reconciliation, and the publication of a multi-volume report detailing the testimonies of survivors and historical documents from the time. The TRC report concluded that the school system amounted to cultural genocide. In 2021, thousands of unmarked graves were discovered on the grounds of former residential schools, and are continuing to be searched.

== See also ==
- Blue law
- Freedom of religion
- Human Rights in Canada
- List of Supreme Court of Canada cases (Dickson Court)
- Lord's Day Act
- Lord's Day Observance Society
- R. v. Big M Drug Mart Ltd. (1985)
- R. v. Edwards Books and Art Ltd.(1986)
- Sabbath in Christianity
- Sunday Shopping
- Sunday Trading Act 1994 English & Welsh Sunday Trading Act
- Persecution of Jehovah's Witnesses in Canada

== Sources ==
- Browne, William Hand (1890). George Calvert and Cecil Calvert: Barons Baltimore of Baltimore. New York: Dodd, Mead, and Company.
- Fiske, John (1897). Old Virginia and Her Neighbors. Boston: Houghton Mifflin.
- Pope, Peter Edward (2004). Fish into Wine: the Newfoundland Plantation in the Seventeenth Century. Chapel Hill: Published for the Omohundro Institute of Early American History and Culture, Williamsburg, Virginia, by the University of North Carolina Press. ISBN 0-8078-2910-2.
- MIlls, Frederick V. (September 2024). "Liberty and Loyalty: The Canadian Experience and the Transformation of British Ecclesiastical Policy, 1759–1774". Anglican and Episcopal History. 93 (3): 597–633.
