= History of Seventh-day Adventist freedom of religion in Canada =

Religious history in Canada

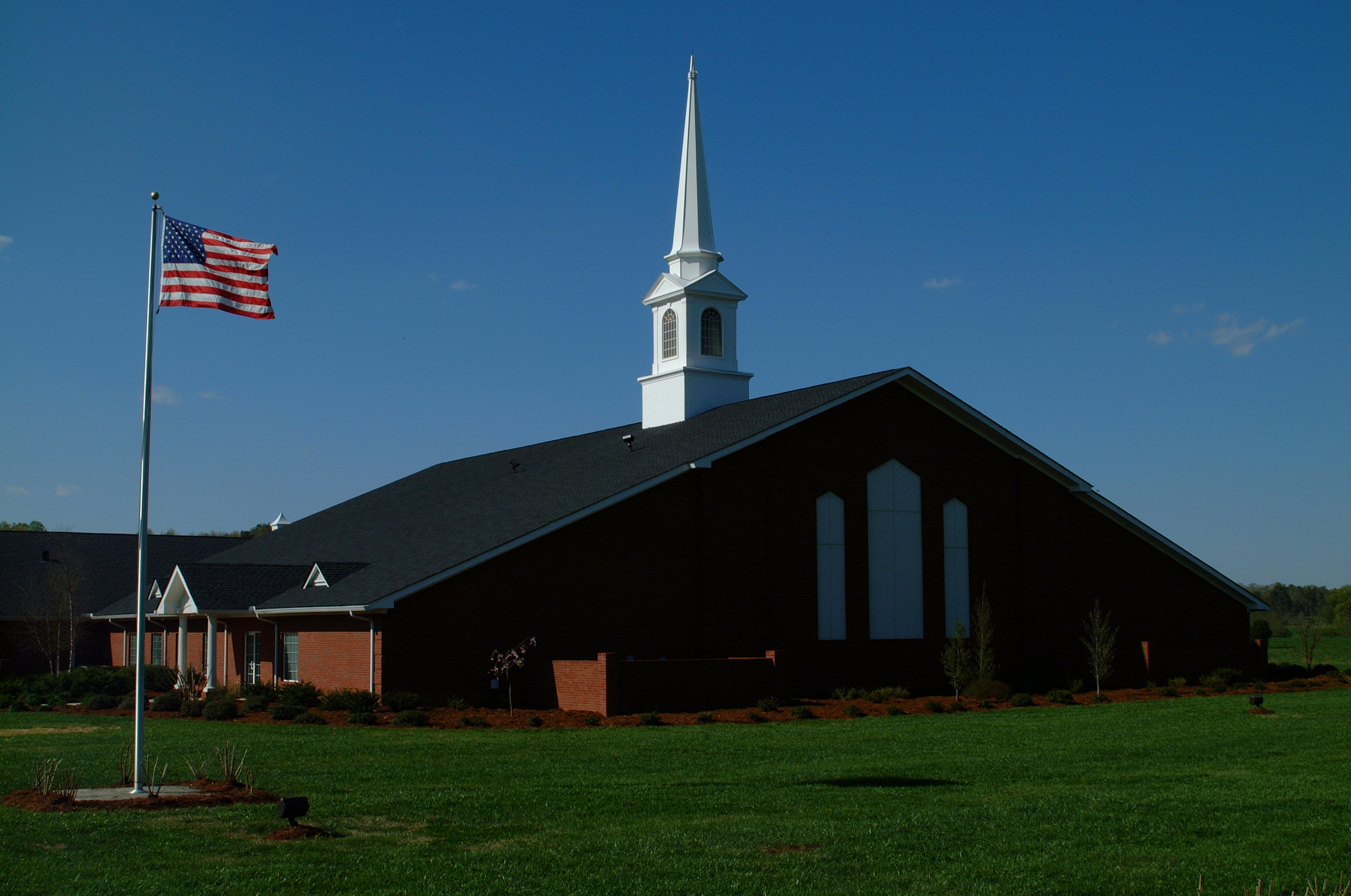
A Seventh-day Adventist Church

Freedom of religion in Canada is a constitutionally protected right, allowing residents the freedom to assemble and worship as each sees fit without coercion, limitation or interference. The Seventh Day Adventist Church's minority status increased its sensitivity to religious freedom early in its history. Shortly after its birth in 1860, the American Civil War and later "Sunday legislation" in the 1880s and 1890s raised concerns about religious liberty. That sensitivity accompanied the church's expansion into Canada.

== Timeline ==
- 1904, Lornedale Academy Workers arrested for violating Sunday Law
- 1904, International Sunday Rest Conference, St. Louis
- 1906, An Act Respecting the Lord's Day.
- 1950, The Shops Act (UK)
- 1952, Lord's Day Act, R.S.C. 1952, c. 171, s. 4.
- 1961, June 26. Lewis E. Gordon, owner of a coin-operated laundry business, held in violation of the Lord's Day Act by the Supreme Court of Canada.
- 1960s, Walter v. A.G. Alberta
- 1985, The Supreme Court of Canada finds the Lord's Day Act unconstitutional in R. v. Big M Drug Mart Ltd

== 1904 arrest of Lornedale Academy workers for violating Sunday Law ==
The September 1, 1904, edition of The Messenger (Adventist newspaper) reported:

"On Monday, August 15, Brethren Charles Sweeten and Fred Boettger, who for more than a year past have been employed on the Lorne Dale Academy farm, were summoned to appear before the Magistrate in answer to a complaint made against them for working on 'the Lord's day, commonly called Sunday, in violation of the law.' The summons was made returnable on Friday, August 19 at 2 o'clock p.m., at Cooksville.

The defense attorney failed to appear at the trial. Sweeten did not want to proceed without his attorney. However, the Crown attorney demanded his pay for the day plus compensation for the large number of witnesses he had called. Sweeten relented and the trial began. Eugene Leland helped present a defense of the two men's "not guilty" plea. As the trial proceeded, the witnesses were unclear as to what they had seen. "The only witness put on the stand who could bear positive testimony was a memher of the S. D. Adventist church, a young girl who had been employed at the farm picking berries, who reluctantly testified that Bro. Sweeten was in the patch on the day specified and was carrying berries."

Leland's defense was that the 1845 law did not include "farmers". Both Boettger and Sweeten testified that they were farmers. Leland concluded his defense by stating some principles involved in Sunday laws in general and showing that there was no Biblical authority requiring Sunday observance. The Magistrate made remarks that convinced the men that they would be convicted. He expressed sympathy for "this people" because he believed they were sincere, but he "did not believe that anybody had a right to set a day apart different from the majority of people, on which to worship, but should conform to the day on which the majority worshipped." The trial was adjourned until the August 25th for a decision.

The September 8, 1904 edition of the Review and Herald reported, "ELDER EUGENE LELAND writes us from Lorne Park, Ontario, under date of August 26, that Brother Charles Sweeten, manager of the Lornedale Academy farm, and Brother Fred Boettger, a student in the academy, have been arrested and fined five dollars each and costs, with the alternative of a term in the county jail, for the same crime (?) of having failed to observe Sunday as the Sabbath."

== 1906, The Lord's Day Act ==
The Lord's Day Act, which since 1906 had prohibited business transactions from taking place on Sundays, was struck down as unconstitutional in the 1985 case R. v. Big M Drug Mart Ltd. Calgary police officers witnessed several transactions on a Sunday at the Big M Drug Mart. Big M was charged with violating the Lord's Day Act. A provincial court ruled that the Act was unconstitutional, but the Crown appealed all the way to the Supreme Court of Canada. In a unanimous 6-0 decision, the Lord's Day Act was ruled an infringement of the freedom of conscience and religion defined in section 2(a) of the Charter of Rights and Freedoms.

=== Apocalyptic View of Sunday Legislation ===
Canadian Seventh-day Adventists saw apocalyptic foreshadowing in Sunday law. Seventh-day Adventists teach that the command to worship the image of the beast found in Revelation 13 predicts Sunday observance legislation at the end of the Earth's history.

One writer said it this way:

Incidentally, this Sunday law that is imminent is not anything unusual. It was the same law that was proclaimed by Constantine in the year 321 A.D. And to Constantine can be traced the mating of secular and ecclesiastical interests that culminated in the despotism of the Dark Ages. It is this union that will plunge us into the final conflict. We cannot say how the final events will come upon us in this part of the world. But it is soon to come. We must be prepared spiritually to face any conflict that the enemy may bring to us.

"How? First, we must proclaim in certain tones the fast-fulfilling signs of the end. We should not invite persecution in any form by unduly stressing our peculiarities and differences, but only show others by our life that we are dedicated to truth—in all areas. We must avoid anti-other-religious and "holier-than-thou" attitudes. Our message proclaims love for God and our fellow men. We must exercise tolerance and kindness among ourselves within our own church and practise religious liberty toward those of different faiths. Above all, we should be ready at all times."

=== Adventist Lobbying Efforts ===
Seventh-day Adventists vigorously opposed the Lord's Day Act as it was being formulated.

The Canadian Union Messenger, April 1, 1904:

Do we not recognize in the efforts now being made in the Dominion Parliament to secure enforced Sunday observance as an indication of the days when freedom to worship God according to the dictates of our conscience will be a thing of the past? It means something to some of our brethren when such organized efforts to restrict their liberties respecting their worship is being put forth and they are not all going to sit idly by and see their privileges to worship as they choose and when they choose taken from them."

In its first issue for 1906, the Canadian Union Messenger reported that the leadership expected all the churches would place large orders for the religious liberty tracts addressing the pending Sunday legislation. The membership seemed stirred over the matter. They showed a lively interest in petitions addressing it.

==== Response to the Newspapers ====
As Canadians agitated for or against the proposed legislation, the newspapers joined the debate. The January 11, 1906 edition of the church's Canadian Union Messenger led with an article titled, "The 'Globe' and the Lord's Day." The Messenger editor reported on the Toronto Daily Globe's coverage saying that the Globe referred to those opposed Sunday legislation as "mockers". He asserted that the Globe was appealing to "the prejudices of the vulgar" rather than "the sober intelligence of candid men."

==== Petition signatures ====
A. O. Burrill, the president of the Ontario Conference, said that the average person did not want stricter Sunday laws. He and other Adventists went person-to-person inviting them to sign a petition opposing the law. He asked each individual if they wanted stricter Sunday laws. If the person said, "No", he asked them to sign the petition. Most agreed. Afterwards, he would give them a tract.

==== Meeting with Prime Minister Laurier ====
On January 18, 1906, W. H. Thurston, President of the Canadian Union Conference, H. E. Rickard, a Quebec pastor, A. O. Burrill, President of the Ontario Conference and Eugene Leland, editor of the Canadian Union Messenger, met with the Canadian Prime Minister Wilfrid Laurier and with the Minister of Justice, Mr Kirpatrick. They presented a brief setting forth the Adventists' reasons for objecting to the law. Neither politician commented on the brief.

Later that day, a public meeting was held in Ottawa's St. George's Hall but attendance was poor. The meeting appeared in Ottawa papers.

=== A Failed Amendment ===
On April 19, 1906, at a public hearing on the bill, Mayor Folinsbee, of Strathroy, spoke on behalf of those who observed the seventh-day, or Saturday. As a result, the government adopted the following amendment:

"Notwithstanding anything herein contained, whoever conscientiously and habitually observes the seventh day of the week as the Sabbath, and actually refrains from work and labor on that day, shall not be subject to prosecution for performing work or labor on the first day of the week, provided that such work or labor does not disturb other persons in the observance of the first day of the week as holy time, and that the place where the same is performed be not open for traffic on that day."

In response to this amendment, the Toronto Methodist Conference sent a telegram to Prime Minister Laurier stating:

Toronto Methodist Conference, assembled here, unanimously opposed to clause 11 [exemption clause] in Lord's Day Act. R. H. Burns, Pres.; Isaac Couch, Sec."

=== Lord's Day Alliance ===
In 1901, the various Sunday-observance organizations united to form a Canada-wide, non-denominational lobby group called the Lord's Day Alliance. Presbyterian minister John George Shearer, with Methodist and evangelical Anglican support, led the alliance to persuade the government of Canada to pass the Lord's Day Act of 1906. "Under Methodist minister T. Albert Moore, the alliance grew into a powerful inter-denominational lobby group, with provincial field secretaries reporting on Sunday activities and prosecutions and instigating Sunday controversies in each province."

Adventists observed the Seventh-day as the Sabbath placing themselves at variance with the Alliance leadership.

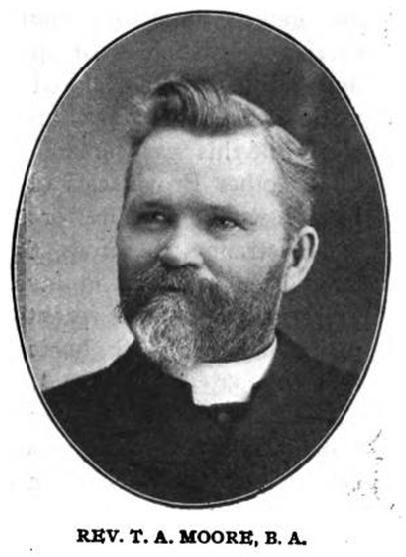

T. Albert Moore, Methodist minister, Secretary of the Lord's Day Alliance and future moderator of the United Church of Canada, wrote to the school:

Dear Sir: We have been informed that you have been carrying on the operations of mowing hay on Sunday, 26th of July, 1908. Witnesses whose reliability can not be questioned have given their written evidence to prove these charges. The Lord's Day Act of Canada clearly forbids all such work on the Lord's day. Although we have been requested to report this complaint to the authorities for prosecution, we have hesitated to do so, because we do not wish to cause you trouble or to put you to expense. If you will write us by return mail assuring us that hereafter you will not pursue the work on your farm on the Lord's day, we shall not report this complaint. Hoping for an early and satisfactory reply. Yours faithfully, T. Albert Moore."

Another letter was sent to the management of the Academy:

Dear Sir: An effort was made when the Parliament was enacting the law, to have people who observe Saturday as the Sabbath exempted from the operations of the Lord's Day Act under certain limitations. But Parliament refused to adopt such a clause. All citizens of Canada are brought under the operations of the law. The people who observe Saturday, and the people who observe Friday, and the people who observe Wednesday, as well as the people who observe Sunday as their day for rest and worship, are all by the Canadian laws commanded that they shall not carry on their ordinary labor or business on the Lord's day. You are expected to observe that law, if you intend to reside in Canada. We shall always seek to enforce this law justly and reasonably, but we desire it to be distinctly understood that the people who reside in Canada must be obedient thereto. We are not robbing any one of one day each week by insistence of obedience to the Lord's Day Act. Every person who dwells in Canada knows the laws in regard to this matter, and also, that to enjoy the advantages of residence in this country each person must obey these laws. Yours faithfully, T. Albert Moore."

== Brantford Adventist School ==
In the fall of 1916 Brantford city officials tried to close the Adventist church school there. In October, the truant officer served two of the parents with a summons to answer a truancy charge for not sending their children to the public school. When they appeared in court a lay justice of the peace presided. The school inspector and the truancy officer tried for an immediate decision against the parents, but the judge adjourned the case for one week.

Meanwhile, M. N. Campbell, the president of the church's Eastern Canadian region, returned from a meeting in Washington D.C. He advised the members involved to get a "first class solicitor" to represent them. At the next hearing, the regular judge presided. He was severe in his criticism of the school and the two parents. The judge, chief of police, school inspector and truant officer were all against the school. Teacher Myrtle Patten testified concerning her qualifications and the character of her work. The judge was inclined to dismiss the charges, but at the request of the truancy office and police chief he adjourned the case once more.

At the close of the hearing Campbell had a personal talk with the judge. He explained to him the Adventist educational system and the reasons why Adventists maintained separate schools. He gave the judge a copy of General Conference Bulletin No. 14 which outlined the curriculum for the church's elementary schools. This conversation had a favorable effect. The judge expressed surprise concerning the character and extent of the Adventist educational system. At the final hearing all objections to the Adventist school were withdrawn and the case was dismissed.

== Military service ==
The following is an extract from the Military Service Act, Chapter 19, of the Statutes of Canada, 1917, commonly called the Conscription Act, dealing with applications for exemption:

Section 2, Sub. Sec. 1. Every male British subject who comes within one of the classes described in Section 3 of this act, and who is ordinarily resident in Canada; or, (b) has been at any time since the fourth day of August, nineteen hundred fourteen, resident in Canada, shall be liable to be called out as heretofore provided on active service in the Canadian expeditionary force for the defense of Canada, either in or beyond Canada, unless he (a) comes within the exemptions set out in the schedule ...

"Sec. II, Sub. Sec. 1. At any time before a date to be fixed in the proclamation mentioned in Sec. 4, an application may be made, by or in respect of any man in the class or subclass called out by such proclamation, to a local tribunal established in the province in which such man ordinarily resides, for a certificate of exemption on any of the following grounds: ...

"(f) That he conscientiously objects to the undertaking of combatant service and is prohibited from so doing by the tenets and articles of faith, in effect on the sixth day of July, nineteen hundred and seventeen, of any organized religious denomination existing and well recognized in Canada at such date, and to which he in good faith belongs; and if any of the grounds of such application be established, a certificate of exemption shall be granted to such man."

"Sub. Sec. 2. (a) A certificate may be conditional as to time or otherwise, and, if granted solely on conscientious grounds, shall state that such exemption is from combat service only... "

== World Calendar Reform ==
In 1930 Elisabeth Achelis proposed a change to calendars known as World Calendar that would have changed the weekly pattern of days, meaning that the Sabbath would no longer occur on a fixed day of the week. The United States opposed the plan. Seventh-day Adventists expressed their opposition to any calendar which altered the weekly cycle. In 1955, the Fifth Quadrennial Session voted its opposition to the change.

== Canada's 1906 Lord's Day Act ==
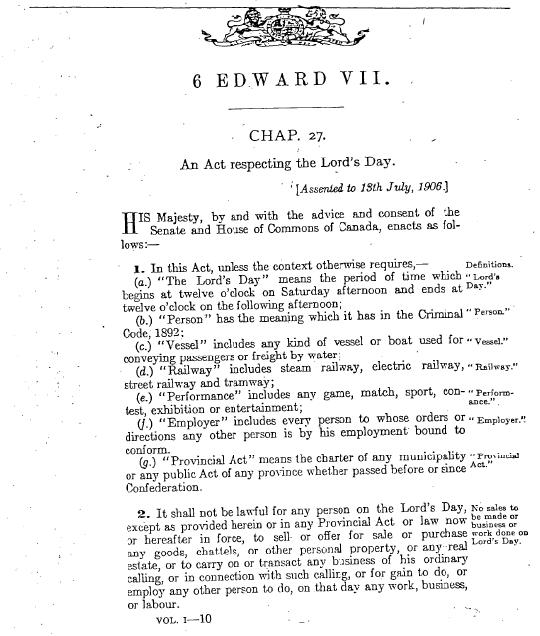
Canada 1906, Lord's Day Act, 1 of 5

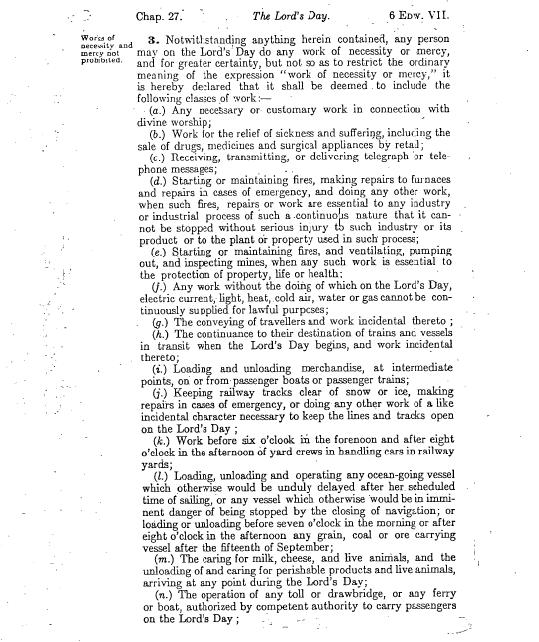
Canada 1906, Lord's Day Act, 2 of 5

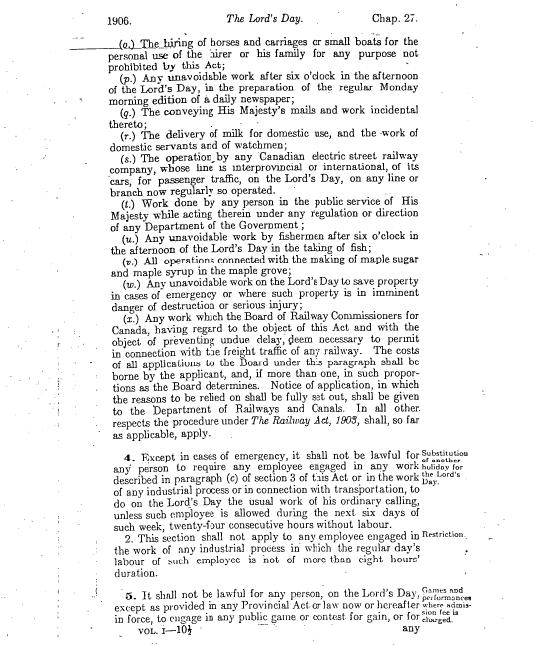
Canada 1906, Lord's Day Act, 3 of 5

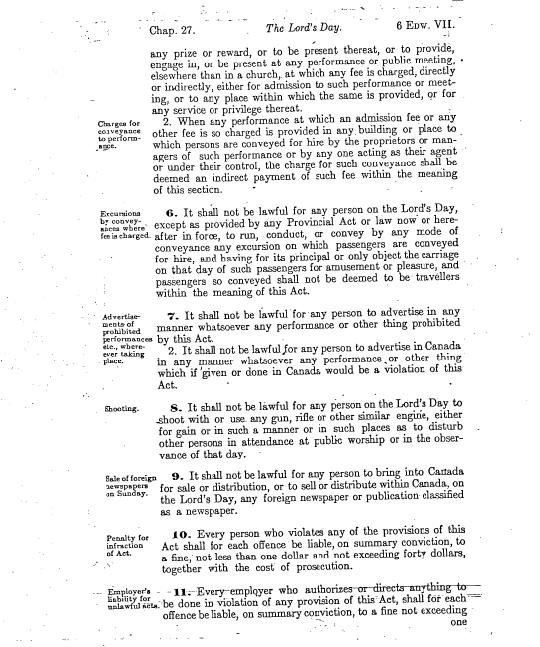
Canada 1906, Lord's Day Act, 4 of 5

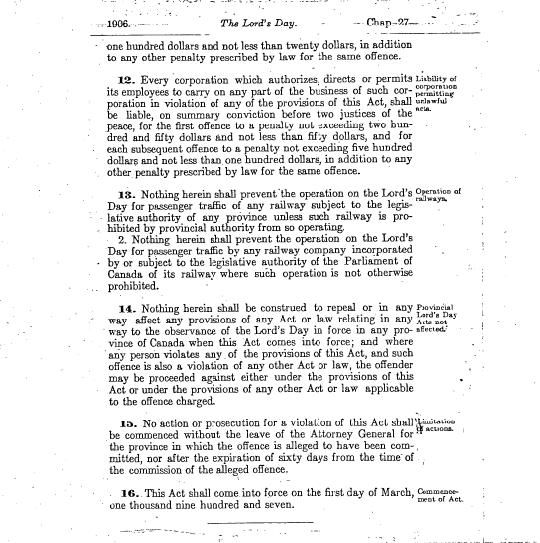
Canada 1906, Lord's Day Act, 5 of 5

== See also ==
- Blue law
- Chick-fil-A - distinct among fast-food chains as it does not operate on Sundays
- Freedom of religion
- Human Rights in Canada
- Keep Sunday Special - a UK campaign against extended Sunday trading
- List of Supreme Court of Canada cases (Dickson Court)
- Lord's Day Act
- Lord's Day Observance Society
- R. v. Big M Drug Mart Ltd. (1985)
- R. v. Edwards Books and Art Ltd. (1986)
- Sabbath in Christianity
- Shopping hours
- Sunday Shopping
- Sunday Trading Act 1994 English & Welsh Sunday Trading Act
