= Multani v Commission scolaire Marguerite‑Bourgeoys =

2006 Supreme Court of Canada case

- Supreme Court of Canada

Hearing: Argued April 12, 2005 Judgment: March 2, 2006
- Full case name: Baljit Singh Multani and Balvir Singh Multani, in his capacity as tutor to his minor son Gurbaj Singh Multani v Commission scolaire Marguerite‑Bourgeoys and Attorney General of Quebec
- Citations: 1 S.C.R. 256, 2006 SCC 6
- Prior history: Judgement for the Attorney General in the Court of Appeal for Quebec.

Holding
- The ban against a non-violent student carrying a kirpan in school is a breach of section 2(a) of the Canadian Charter of Rights

Court membership
- Chief Justice: Beverley McLachlin; Puisne Justices: Michel Bastarache, Ian Binnie, Louis LeBel, Marie Deschamps, Morris Fish, Rosalie Abella, Louise Charron

Reasons given
- Majority: Charron J., joined by McLachlin, Bastarache, Binnie and Fish JJ.
- Concurrence: Deschamps and Abella JJ.
- Concurrence: LeBel J.

Multani v Commission scolaire Marguerite‑Bourgeoys, [2006] 1 S.C.R. 256, 2006 SCC 6 is a decision by the Supreme Court of Canada in which the Court struck down an order of a Quebec school authority, that prohibited a Sikh child from wearing a kirpan to school, as a violation of freedom of religion under section 2(a) of the Canadian Charter of Rights and Freedoms. This order could not be saved under section 1 of the Charter.

The case involved a 13-year-old Sikh named Gurbaj Singh, who in November 2001 dropped a metal kirpan at his school, École Sainte Catherine Labouré. This prompted the school board to request certain limits on the wearing of the kirpan, including that it be covered at all times. The Sikh family accepted this request. However, another board, in February 2002, overrode the school board, deciding that the kirpan was a weapon and thus was not allowed under the code of conduct. The council of commissioners agreed with the latter decision, although they suggested a non-metal kirpan could be used. The Quebec Court of Appeal found in favour of the council of commissioners.

== Decision ==
First, the majority of the Court, whose opinion was authored by Justice Louise Charron, denied that the case should be decided under the rules of administrative law, which required simple reasonableness. The majority believed this would limit the rights under the Charter. As Charron wrote, "The rights and freedoms guaranteed by the Canadian Charter establish a minimum constitutional protection that must be taken into account by the legislature and by every person or body subject to the Canadian Charter." The rule against weapons under administrative law was not the subject of this case. The real focus was how in practise the law banned the kirpan. The Court went on to note that the council of commissioners, which had banned the kirpan, was bound by the Charter. This was because the council was created by a statute and thus received its powers from a legislature. While the concurring justices Deschamps and Abella believed section 1 of the Charter could only be used on unconstitutional written laws, Charron wrote that section 1 can also be applied to delegated power. If the power is used according to the law, it is "prescribed by law" as required by section 1; Little Sisters Book and Art Emporium v. Canada (Minister of Justice) (2000) was an example of a case in which delegated power was not prescribed by law. Since the council acted according to the law, the Court could now look at the freedom of religion issue.

=== Freedom of religion ===
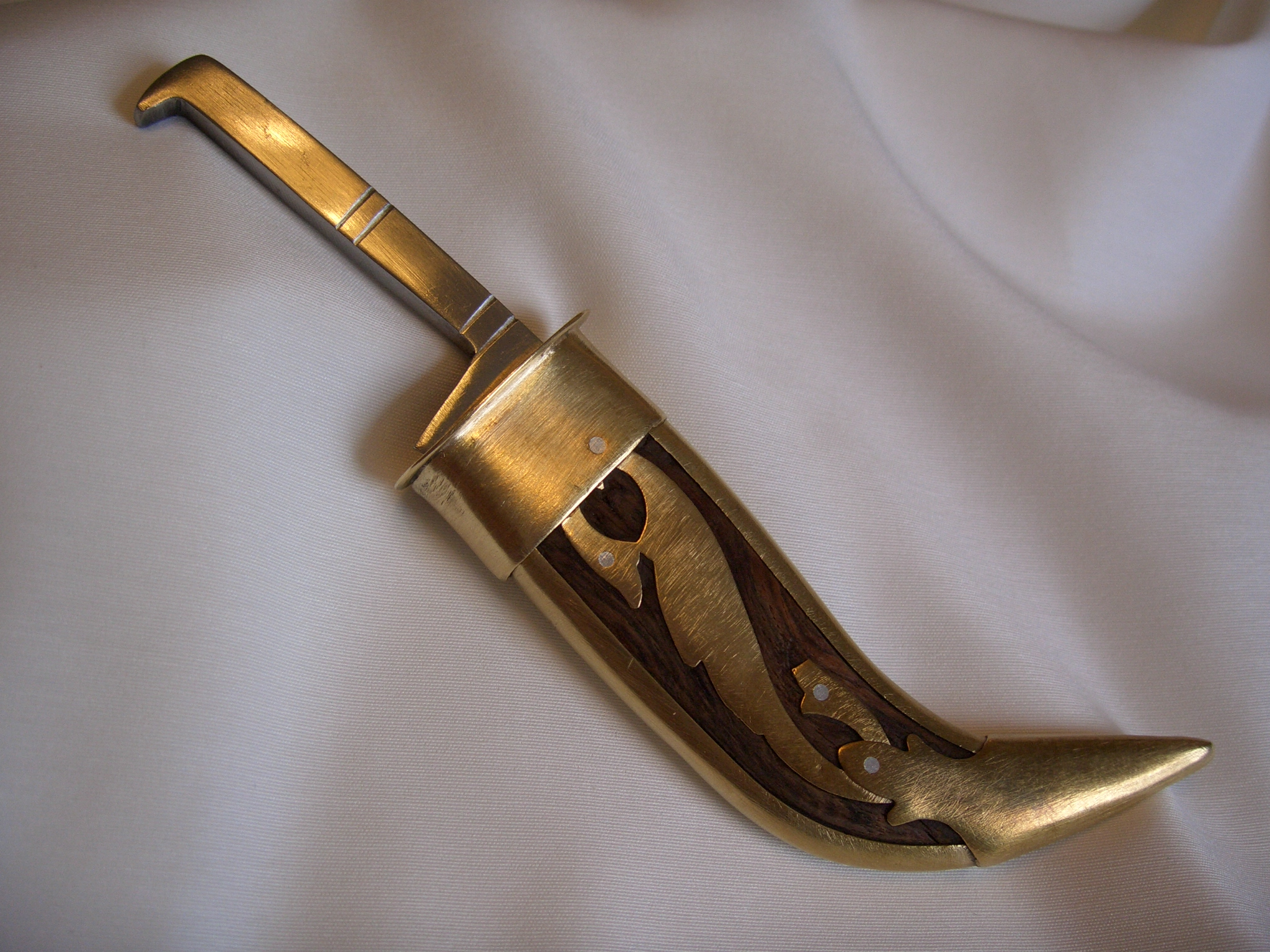
A student's right to carry a kirpan is an example of religious freedom according to the Supreme Court.

This raised the question of whether freedom of religion was an "absolute right" or had "internal limits" aside from the limits under section 1. Trinity Western University v. British Columbia College of Teachers (2001) was cited to suggest freedom of religion is limited by other values aside from under section 1, in this case the goals of order and security. The Supreme Court noted that since R. v. Big M Drug Mart Ltd. (1985), there had been recognition that freedom of religion should not be used to harm others, but section 1 was the ideal place for this consideration. In contrast, in the Trinity Western University case, the Court merely had to address a situation in which freedom of religion and equality rights might contradict each other. As this contradiction was prevented by the Supreme Court, section 1 was not used to harmonize the two rights. With these issues in mind, the Court turned to apply freedom of religion analysis to this case.

The decision followed precedent in Syndicat Northcrest v. Amselem (2004) that for a claim to freedom of religion to succeed, an individual should show they believe a practise is connected to a religious belief. Next, the infringement of freedom of religion should be serious. In this case, the carrying of the kirpan was deemed to be connected to religion because it was necessary according to Orthodox Sikhism. The same beliefs also dictated that the kirpan not be used to harm others. The claimant's belief that the kirpan must be metal was also considered sincere. While other Sikhs used non-metal kirpans, that was irrelevant to the beliefs of this individual. The Court then moved on to find the violation of freedom of religion was considerable. The claimant had to leave public school.

=== Reasonable limits ===
The Court then turned to consider whether the violation of freedom of religion could be upheld under section 1 of the Charter. Following R. v. Oakes (1986), the Court asked whether there was a sufficient objective for the violation. The main concern, as noted by the Quebec Court of Appeal, was school safety, which helps to maintain an atmosphere in which students can learn. The Supreme Court agreed that would qualify as an important objective under section 1. However, they then noted there were varying degrees of safety, with the highest degree of safety being excessive. The Court contemplated the highest degree of safety would require the banning of scissors and other such objects. Thus, safety in school is usually only supposed to be "reasonable." However, because the council wanted to rid the schools of weapons, the Court deemed the council's objective to be reasonable. This raised the question as to whether the rights infringement was rational and proportionate to the objective. The banning of the kirpan was considered rational because it was a weapon, and thus the banning fit the objective of ridding the school of weapons.

However, the banning of the kirpan was not proportionate to the objective. It was noted the claimant could not wear the kirpan at school at all, even though the claimant would have accepted limitations. The council had said that the kirpan could be stolen, or it could encourage other students to bring weapons to school. The Supreme Court replied the claimant himself was not violent, and the limitations accepted by the claimant made a theft unlikely. The thief would have to seize the claimant and look under the claimant's clothing. Additionally, there was little to no proof students have used kirpans as weapons in schools. Although cases involving airline security have resulted in the banning of kirpans on planes, the Court quoted the Canadian Human Rights Tribunal as saying whereas people know each other in a school, planes will always carry different people who never know each other. There is little opportunity to judge whether a passenger is violent. As for the argument that the kirpan could encourage other students to bring weapons to school, as defence against the kirpan, the Court replied this was speculative. Of relation to this concern was the worry that the school atmosphere would be negatively affected. The Court replied it was untrue that the kirpan represented violence, and that it had religious meanings instead. The Court also found this theory could be offensive to Sikhs and would thus contradict multiculturalism. If some students feel it is unfair that the claimant can wear a kirpan to school while they cannot carry knives, the Court suggested schools should teach these students the importance of freedom of religion.

It was noted that in Trinity Western University v. British Columbia College of Teachers, the Court had said schools should teach values and promote civic virtue. Allowing the kirpan would thus be beneficial in that it would teach students the importance of freedom of religion.

== Concurrences ==
=== Deschamps and Abella ===
Justices Marie Deschamps and Rosalie Abella wrote a concurring opinion. While they agreed with Charron's decision to overturn the ban on the kirpan, they found that the proper way to do this was through the rules of administrative law. Constitutional law should be used primarily for statutes and regulations, and the tests used in constitutional law, such as the Oakes test, work best on these laws. Section 1 of the Charter indicates the Oakes test best applies to decisions "prescribed by law." Meanwhile, administrative law would work when dealing with what in this case was an administrative body. Following the Trinity Western University case and Chamberlain v. Surrey School District No. 36, Charron and Abella also felt a measure of deference was appropriate. There was also indication that the law meant for local authorities rather than courts to have a greater say in such matters. At any rate, Descamps and Abella found that "it is difficult to imagine a decision that would be considered reasonable or correct even though it conflicted with constitutional values." The ideal situation would be for administrative laws to apply Charter values rather than to have their decisions challenged as violations of the Charter.

Administrative law required reasonableness. The Quebec Court of Appeal found that kirpans could only be harmful, but Abella and Deschamps criticized this opinion for neglecting other evidence. Other objects commonly found at school can be used as weapons. Moreover, the Sikh student had accepted limits on the wearing of the kirpan. Thus, the decision was judged unreasonable.

=== LeBel ===
Another concurrence was written by Justice Louis LeBel. He noted the difficulty of using a section 1 analysis, in this case on administrative law. He wrote that the Canadian Charter and Quebec Charter of Human Rights and Freedoms do not always need to be used when administrative law provides an analytical framework. However, the Constitution of Canada inevitably has an impact in some cases. In this case freedom of religion was invoked, as well as security of person under section 7 of the Charter when it came to other students' safety.

To reconcile these conflicting rights, LeBel wrote that section 1 was not the only possible answer. He pointed to Young v. Young (1993) to support this proposition. In this situation, evaluating the ban on kirpans should be done through administrative law regarding the commission's authority to protect security of person, and then this evaluation should be judged in light of the Constitution. Before moving to section 1, the rights should be defined. In this case, LeBel found no evidence anyone's security of person was at risk. Turning to the Oakes test, he disregarded the requirement for a sufficient objective for rights violations since the governing statutes were not questioned. On the issue of proportionality, he felt the commission did not effectively prove its case.

== See also ==
- List of Supreme Court of Canada cases (McLachlin Court)
