= Doré v Barreau du Québec =

- Supreme Court of Canada

Hearing: January 26, 2011 Judgment: March 22, 2012
- Full case name: Gilles Doré v. Pierre Bernard, in his capacity as Assistant Syndic of the Barreau du Québec, Tribunal des professions and Attorney General of Quebec
- Citations: 2012 SCC 12
- Docket No.: 33594
- Prior history: Judgment against Doré in the Court of Appeal for Quebec.
- Ruling: Appeal dismissed.

Holding
- R. v. Oakes does not apply to Charter issues in the context of administrative law. Instead, the question is whether the administrative decision reflects a proportionate balancing of the Charter rights and values at play.

Court membership
- Chief Justice: Beverley McLachlin; Puisne Justices: Ian Binnie, Louis LeBel, Marie Deschamps, Morris Fish, Rosalie Abella, Louise Charron, Marshall Rothstein, Thomas Cromwell

Reasons given
- Unanimous reasons by: Abella J.
- Deschamps and Charron JJ. took no part in the consideration or decision of the case.

Doré v Barreau du Québec [2012] 1 S.C.R. 395, 2012 SCC 12 is an administrative law decision by the Supreme Court of Canada regarding how to apply the Canadian Charter of Rights and Freedoms to adjudicative decisions, as opposed to statutory law. The Court found that the test in R. v. Oakes (which is used to determine whether a law that infringes a section of the Charter is unconstitutional under section 1 of the Charter) does not apply to administrative law decisions, although there is "conceptual harmony" between the review for reasonableness and the Oakes framework. Instead, the question is whether the administrative decision is reasonable, in that it reflects a proportionate balancing of the Charter rights and values at play. In addition to the parties (Doré, the Barreau du Québec, the Tribunal des professions, and the Attorney General of Quebec), the Court heard from the following intervenors: the Federation of Law Societies of Canada, the Canadian Civil Liberties Association, and the Young Bar Association of Montreal.

== Background ==
=== Initial dispute ===
On June 18 and 19, 2001, Gilles Doré appeared as a defence counsel in a criminal proceeding in the Superior Court of Quebec. During Doré's oral arguments, the judge said in reference to Doré: "an insolent lawyer is rarely of use to his client".

On June 21, 2001, in his written reasons dismissing Doré's arguments, the judge was highly critical of Doré's arguments and his manner and style in court. The judge called Doré's application "totally ridiculous", and that Doré "on or obsessed with his narrow vision of reality, which is not consistent with the facts, Mr. Doré has done nothing to help his client discharge his burden."

=== Doré's letter and complaint ===
Later on June 21, 2001, Doré wrote an extremely insulting private letter to the judge, which included the following complaints:

- "Just a few minutes ago, as you hid behind your status like a coward, you made comments about me that were both unjust and unjustified."
- "Your chronic inability to master any social skills (to use an expression in English, that language you love so much), which has caused you to become pedantic, aggressive and petty in your daily life..."
- "Your legal knowledge, which appears to have earned the approval of a certain number of your colleagues, is far from sufficient to make you the person you could or should be professionally."
- "Your determination to obliterate any humanity from your judicial position, your essentially non-existent listening skills, and your propensity to use your court – where you lack the courage to hear opinions contrary to your own – to launch ugly, vulgar, and mean personal attacks not only confirms that you are as loathsome as suspected, but also casts shame on you as a judge..."
- "...you possess the most appalling of all defects for a man in your position: You are fundamentally unjust."

On June 22, 2001, Doré wrote to the Chief Justice, indicating that he was not making a complaint, but that he was requesting not to appear in front of the judge in question.

On July 10, 2001, Doré made a complaint to the Canadian Judicial Council about the judge's conduct. The council would later conclude in 2002 that the judge made "unjustified derogatory remarks to Mr. Doré", and supported some of the complaints that Doré had about the judge, but with less inflammatory language. The judge later recused himself from a trial where Doré was counsel.

=== Disciplinary Council ===
In March 2002, disciplinary proceedings began against Doré in relation to the June 21, 2001 letter he wrote to the judge. The complaint was that he violated Article 2.03 of the Code of ethics of advocates, which stated, at the time, that: "[T]he conduct of an advocate must bear the stamp of objectivity, moderation and dignity."

The proceedings took place between April 2003 and January 2006. The Disciplinary Council found that the letter was "likely to offend and is rude and insulting". The Council found that the letter was not private since it was written by Doré as a lawyer. The council also found that the judge's conduct did not justify the letter.

The Council rejected Doré's argument that Article 2.03 violated the freedom of expression in s. 2 of the Charter. The Council acknowledged that the rule limited Doré's freedom of expression, but that it was justified and necessary.

As a penalty, Doré's ability to practice law was suspended for 21 days.

=== Tribunal des professions ===
Doré appealed to the Tribunal des professions. The Tribunal ruled that the full Oakes test to determine whether a Charter infringement was justified under s. 1 of the Charter was inappropriate in these circumstances. Instead, applying a test of proportionality, the Discipline Council's decision was a "minimal limitation".

=== Superior Court of Quebec ===
On judicial review, the Superior Court of Quebec upheld the Tribunal's decision.

=== Quebec Court of Appeal ===
The Quebec Court of Appeal applied the full Oakes test, but still found that the Discipline Council's decision was justified under s. 1 of the Charter.

== Reasons of the court ==
The only issue appealed before the Court was whether the Discipline Council's decision infringed his right to freedom of expression under s. 2(b) of the Charter.

A unanimous decision was written by Abella J.

The Court found that a more flexible approach is required to applying Charter values to administrative law decisions affecting a single individual, and that a full Oakes s. 1 analysis created too many difficulties.

The Court went on to find that the standard of review for an administrative tribunal's decision as it relates to the impact on a specific individual's Charter rights is "reasonableness", not "correctness". That is, a reviewing court will only interfere if the decision was unreasonable. If the decision was reasonable, even if the reviewing court would have come to different conclusion, then the reviewing court will not interfere.

With the standard of review in mind, the Court found that a decision will be reasonable if the decision-maker balances the Charter values with the statutory objectives by doing the following:

1. Considering what the statutory objectives are.
2. Determining how the Charter values at issue are best protected in view of the statutory objectives.

A court reviewing the decision-maker's decision must decide whether the decision reflects a proportional balancing of the Charter protections in play.

In applying the above analysis to Doré's case, the Court found that the issue was how to balance the right of freedom of expression and making open criticism of the judicial process with the need to ensure civility in the legal profession. The Court went on to find that the Discipline Council's decision to reprimand Doré was not unreasonable on the balance.

== See also ==
- List of Supreme Court of Canada cases (McLachlin Court)
