= Aubry v Éditions Vice-Versa Inc =

- Supreme Court of Canada

Hearing: December 8, 1997 Judgment: April 9, 1998
- Full case name: Les Éditions Vice‑Versa inc. and Gilbert Duclos v. Gilbert Duclos
- Citations: [1998] 1 S.C.R. 591
- Docket No.: 25579
- Prior history: Judgement for Aubry at the Court of Appeal for Quebec.
- Ruling: Appeal dismissed.

Holding
- The conflict between the rights to privacy and expression under the Quebec Charter of Human Rights and Freedoms can only be resolved in the context of individual cases. An artist's right to publish their work is not absolute.

Court membership
- Chief Justice: Antonio Lamer; Puisne Justices: Claire L'Heureux-Dubé, Charles Gonthier, Peter Cory, Beverley McLachlin, Frank Iacobucci, John C. Major, Michel Bastarache, Ian Binnie

Reasons given
- Majority: L'Heureux-Dubé and Bastarache JJ., joined by Gonthier, Cory, and Iacobucci JJ.
- Dissent: Lamer C.J.
- Dissent: Major J.
- Binnie and McLachlin JJ. took no part in the consideration or decision of the case.

Aubry v Éditions Vice-Versa Inc, [1998] 1 S.C.R. 591, was a decision by the Supreme Court of Canada in which the claimant, Pascale Claude Aubry, brought an action against Éditions Vice-Versa for publishing a photo taken of her in public. She claimed the photographing was a violation of her right to privacy under the Quebec Charter of Human Rights and Freedoms. The Court held that under Quebec law a photographer can take photographs in public places but may not publish the picture unless permission has been obtained from the subject.

The Court limited this requirement to exclude persons whose photographs were taken during an event of public interest. That is, a person of public interest or equally an unknown person who is implicated in a public matter cannot claim image rights. Consequently, anyone whose photograph was incidental to a photo of some matter will be treated as part of the background and will not be able to claim their rights were violated.

== Background ==
In 1987, Gilbert Duclos, a photographer for Éditions Vice-Versa took a photograph of a teenaged Pascale Claude Aubry resting on the steps of a building by a public street in Montreal. The photo was published in an edition issue alongside essays about life in Montreal and Vancouver. After Aubry's classmates saw the photo and laughed at her, she initiated a lawsuit against the magazine and the photographer.

Both sides agreed that the photo was taken in a public place and without Aubry's consent. Aubry argued that the photograph violated her privacy rights under Section 4 of the Quebec Charter of Human Rights and Freedoms, which says that “[e]very person has a right to respect for his private life.” Éditions Vice-Versa argued that such an interpretation would violate its Section 3 right to free expression found in the same document.

Aubry was awarded $1500 in damages in the lower courts, and the defendants appealed the decision from the Quebec Court of Appeal to the Supreme Court.

== Ruling ==
The Court held that under Quebec law a photographer can take photographs in public places but may not publish the picture unless permission has been obtained from the subject.

The Court limited this requirement to exclude persons whose photographs were taken during an event of public interest. That is, a person of public interest or equally an unknown person who is implicated in a public matter cannot claim image rights. Consequently, anyone whose photograph was incidental to a photo of some matter will be treated as part of the background and will not be able to claim their rights were violated.

== Aftermath ==
Photojournalist and photographers groups took issue with the decision, arguing that it had the potential to create a chilling effect on their profession. Justice Bastarache later referred to the case in Syndicat Northcrest v. Amselem (2004), to discuss how the Quebec Charter is relevant to personal disputes. The photo became part of the public domain since it was handed to the Supreme Court.

By the time of the decision in April 1998, Éditions Vice-Versa was defunct.

== See also ==
- List of Supreme Court of Canada cases
