= R v Jones =

Canadian court case concerning religious education

- Supreme Court of Canada

Hearing: November 19, 1985 Judgment: October 9, 1986
- Full case name: Thomas Larry Jones v Her Majesty The Queen
- Citations: [1986] 2 S.C.R. 284
- Docket No.: 18962
- Ruling: Jones appeal dismissed

Court membership
- Chief Justice: Brian Dickson; Puisne Justices: Jean Beetz, Willard Estey, William McIntyre, Julien Chouinard, Antonio Lamer, Bertha Wilson, Gerald Le Dain, Gérard La Forest

Reasons given
- Majority: La Forest J. (paras. 1-50), joined by Dickson C.J.
- Concurrence: McIntyre J. (paras. 51-53), joined by Beetz and Le Dain JJ.
- Concurrence: Lamer J. (paras. 54-55)
- Dissent: Wilson J. (paras. 56-87)

R v Jones, [1986] 2 S.C.R. 284 is an early leading Supreme Court of Canada decision on the freedom of religion under section 2(a) of the Canadian Charter of Rights and Freedoms and the right to security of person under section 7.

== Background ==
Thomas Jones was a pastor in a fundamentalist church who did not want his three children educated in school and instead was teaching them himself in the basement of the church. The Alberta Schools Act requires all parents to send their children to school unless the parent can show that they are going to an accredited private school or the government has approved the home-school curriculum. Jones was charged with truancy under the Schools Act.

Jones argued that the rule requiring government approval to educate his children involves "his acknowledging that the government, rather than God, has the final authority over the education of his children" and so contravenes his right to freedom of religion under section 2(a) and his right to have control over how his children are educated which is protected under section 7.

== Reasons of the court ==
Justice Gérard La Forest, for the majority, held that the Act did not violate the Charter. He found that the degree of control that the Act imposed on Jones' children was far from absolute. It was a reasonable requirement and was supported by a compelling interest that it could be justified in a free and democratic society. The certification procedure was in no way manifestly unfair or contravened any principles of fundamental justice and so did not invoke section 7. While the Supreme Court ruled that although Thomas Jones did have to license the school, the provincial government had to provide reasonable accommodation for religious belief. The court ruled that the province must "'delicately and sensitively weigh the competing interests so as to respect as much as possible the religious convictions as guaranteed by the Charter".
