= Hindu Samaj of Hamilton & Region =

- Location in Ontario

Religion
- Affiliation: Hinduism
- Province: Ontario
- Deity: Multiple
- Festivals: Diwali, Krishna Janmashtami, Maha Shivaratri
- Governing body: Board of Directors

Location
- Location: Hamilton
- Country: Canada
- Coordinates: 43°10′48″N 79°51′23″W

Architecture
- Established: 1975

Website
- www.hamiltontemple.com

Hindu Samaj of Hamilton & Region is a non-profit, religious organization based in Hamilton, Ontario, Canada, registered with Canada Customs and Revenue Agency. The organization, whose main operation is the Hindu Samaj Temple, has been serving the community in the new city of Hamilton and vicinity (formerly the regional municipality of Hamilton) since 1975.

== History ==
The organization was formed in 1975 and received the charter as a charitable religious organization in February 1976. In 1984, the samaj purchased an old church and began converting it into a temple; Hindu deities were established, the last being in April 1993. The Temple is a centre of worship and focal point for cultural events for Hindus in the Golden Horseshoe area of Southern Ontario. The major Hindu festivals are organised and celebrated at the temple in accordance with Karma Kand of Sanātana Dharma. The temple also invites and hosts Hindu religious and spiritual leaders from around the world, including India.

The temple was the victim of arson on September 15, 2001. The temple was eventually rebuilt by the local community with assistance from government, and bank loans. The arson and subsequent rebuilding attracted national and international sympathy, and was covered by several international news organisations.

The temple was reopened in 2005. To commemorate the event the City of Hamilton recognised the Temple as a site of historic importance and installed a commemorative plaque. As a direct response to the arson, the city developed the Strengthening Hamilton Community Initiative . The Hamilton Centre for Civic Inclusion (HCCI) was set up in 2006 to act as a centralized hub for access to the knowledge and resources needed to build a strong, racially diverse and welcoming city. After years of investigation, on November 27, 2013, Hamilton Police arrested three men in connection with the arson.

== Operations ==
The temple serves as a religious and a cultural centre for the Hindus in the area. A number of religious ceremonies are regularly performed. Major events that are routinely held at the temple or performed by the priests are: Engagement Ceremony, Marriage (priests are licensed to perform marriages in Ontario), Namakaran, Annaprashana, Mundan Sanskar, Havan, Bhumi Puja, Vastu Shanti/Griha Pravesh, Satyanarayan Puja, Navagraha Puja, Mata Ki Chowki.

== See also ==
- List of Hinduism-related articles
