= Trinity Western University v British Columbia College of Teachers =

- Supreme Court of Canada

Hearing: November 9, 2000 Judgment: May 17, 2001
- Full case name: British Columbia College of Teachers v Trinity Western University and Donna Gail Lindquist
- Citations: Trinity Western University v. College of Teachers, [2001] 1 S.C.R. 772, 2001 SCC 31

Court membership
- Chief Justice: Beverley McLachlin; Puisne Justices: Claire L'Heureux-Dubé, Charles Gonthier, Frank Iacobucci, John C. Major, Michel Bastarache, Ian Binnie, Louise Arbour, Louis LeBel

Reasons given
- Majority: Iacobucci and Bastarache JJ., joined by McLachlin C.J. and Gonthier, Major, Binnie, Arbour and LeBel JJ.
- Dissent: L’Heureux-Dubé J.

Trinity Western University v British Columbia College of Teachers, [2001] 1 S.C.R. 772, 2001 SCC 31, is a leading Supreme Court of Canada decision on the freedom of religion and the court's ability to review a private school's policies.

== Background ==
Trinity Western University is a private Christian university that sought to take full responsibility for an existing teacher education program jointly run by Trinity Western and Simon Fraser University. The school applied to the British Columbia College of Teachers for the proper certification.

The College rejected Trinity Western's application on the grounds that the school's community standards policy, which applied to all students, faculty, and staff, prohibited "homosexual behaviour". The College argued that this policy was discriminatory and that it would not be in the public interest to approve the application.

== Opinion of the Court ==
In an eight to one decision, the Court held that the College "acted unfairly" in rejecting Trinity Western's application. The Court concurred with the lower provincial courts, stating that "[i]n considering the religious precepts of TWU instead of the actual impact of these beliefs on the public school environment, the BCCT acted on the basis of irrelevant considerations."

The Court further observed that "[t]here is nothing in the TWU Community Standards, which are limited to prescribing conduct of members while at TWU, that indicates that graduates of TWU will not treat homosexuals fairly and respectfully. The evidence to date is that graduates from the joint TWU-SFU teacher education program have become competent public school teachers, and there is no evidence before this Court of discriminatory conduct."

== See also ==
- List of Supreme Court of Canada cases (McLachlin Court)
- Multani v. Commission scolaire Marguerite‑Bourgeoys
