= Chaput v Romain =

- Supreme Court of Canada

Hearing: 1955-11-15 Judgment: 1955-11-15
- Full case name: Esymier Chaput v Edmond Romain, Linden Young and Roger Chartrand
- Citations: [1955] SCR 834

Court membership
- Chief Justice: Patrick Kerwin
- Puisne Justices: Robert Taschereau, Ivan Rand, Roy Kellock, James Wilfred Estey, Charles Holland Locke, John Robert Cartwright, Gerald Fauteux, and Douglas Abbott.

Reasons given

Chaput v Romain [1955] SCR 834 was a legal case that was heard by the Supreme Court of Canada. The case had broader implications for freedom of religion in Canada. The case determined that all religions have equal rights, based upon tradition and the rule of law. At the time, no statutes formed the basis for this argument. It was one of many legal cases surrounding the persecution of Jehovah's Witnesses in Canada.

== Background ==
Esymier Chaput was one of 30 Jehovah's Witnesses attending a meeting in his Chapeau, Quebec home on September 4, 1949. Three police officers were observed outside, who asked to enter the premises after confirming that they were having a meeting, and arrested Chaput. They ordered everyone else to leave, seized a bible, song books, and some religious pamphlets. Esymier Chaput first filed the case with the provincial trial court, the Court of Quebec for damages and the value of the seized articles. This action was dismissed by the trial judge and by the Quebec Court of Appeal.

== Case ==
The case was appealed to the Supreme Court of Canada. When one of the police officers was questioned, he stated that he had determined that it was illegal for Jehovah's Witnesses to hold meetings by reading the newspaper. Their legal defence was that Jehovah's Witnesses were known to distribute "seditious libel", created "animosity and hate between different classes of society", and that Chaput did not follow the requirements under the Magistrate's Privilege Act. They also stated that their superior officer ordered them to take these actions. The Supreme Court determined that the police officers had violated the Criminal Code through their actions. The Supreme court also ruled that Chaput was entitled to $2000 in damages and the appeal was sustained, overturning the lower courts. The case is often compared to Saumur v. Quebec (City of) and Roncarelli v Duplessis.

== See also ==
- Lamb v Benoit
- List of Supreme Court cases involving Jehovah's Witnesses
