= Section 2 of the Canadian Charter of Rights and Freedoms =

Constitutional provision concerning fundamental freedoms

Section 2 of the Canadian Charter of Rights and Freedoms ("Charter") is the section of the Constitution of Canada that lists what the Charter calls "fundamental freedoms" theoretically applying to everyone in Canada, regardless of whether they are a Canadian citizen, or an individual or corporation. These freedoms can be held against actions of all levels of government and are enforceable by the courts. The fundamental freedoms are freedom of expression, freedom of religion, freedom of thought, freedom of belief, freedom of peaceful assembly and freedom of association.

Section 1 of the Charter permits Parliament or the provincial legislatures to enact laws that place certain kinds of limited restrictions on the freedoms listed under section 2. Additionally, these freedoms can be temporarily invalidated by section 33, the "notwithstanding clause", of the Charter.

As a part of the Charter and of the larger Constitution Act, 1982, section 2 took legal effect on April 17, 1982. However, many of its rights have roots in Canada in the 1960 Canadian Bill of Rights (although this law was of limited effectiveness), and in traditions under a theorized Implied Bill of Rights. Many of these exemptions, such as freedom of expression, have also been at the centre of federalistic disputes.

== Text ==
Under the heading of "Fundamental Freedoms" the section states:

2. Everyone has the following fundamental freedoms:

(a) freedom of conscience and religion;

(b) freedom of thought, belief, opinion and expression, including freedom of the press and other media of communication;

(c) freedom of peaceful assembly; and

(d) freedom of association.

== Freedom of religion ==
=== Background ===
According to Beverley McLachlin, freedom of religion in Canada may have originated as early as 1759, when French Canadian Roman Catholics were allowed rights of worship by their British conquerors; this was later reconfirmed in 1774 in the Quebec Act. Later the Constitution Act, 1867 provided for denominational school rights (these are reaffirmed by section 29 of the Charter). Discussions of church-state relations also took place in the Guibord case of 1874. In 1955, the Supreme Court ruled in Chaput v Romain, regarding Jehovah's Witnesses, that different religion have rights, based upon tradition and the rule of law (at the time no statutes formed the basis for this argument).

Religious freedom was later included in the Canadian Bill of Rights. However, its effectiveness was limited. When Sunday closing laws compelling respect for the Christian Sabbath were challenged in R v Robertson and Rosetanni, Justice Ritchie of the Supreme Court found that non-Christians merely lost money when denied rights to work on Sunday and were otherwise free to believe in and observe their religions.

=== Definition ===
Freedom of religion under section 2(a) of the Charter was first seriously considered by the Supreme Court in R v Big M Drug Mart Ltd. In that case, Chief Justice Brian Dickson wrote that this freedom at least includes freedom of religious speech, including "the right to entertain such religious beliefs as a person chooses, the right to declare religious beliefs openly and without fear of hindrance or reprisal, and the right to manifest religious belief by worship and practice or by teaching and dissemination." Freedom of religion would also prohibit imposing religious requirements. The immediate consequence of section 2, in this case, was the abolishment of federal Sunday closing laws.

In Syndicat Northcrest v Amselem, the Supreme Court drew up a definition of freedom of religion under the Quebec Charter of Human Rights and Freedoms, mindful of the overlap with section 2(a). The majority found freedom of religion encompasses a right to religious practices if the individual has a sincere belief that the practice is connected to religion. It would not matter whether the practice was needed according to religious authority. If courts can believe an individual is telling the truth in saying a practice is connected to religion, the courts then ask whether the infringement of freedom of religion is severe enough to trigger section 2. The Court also said religious beliefs are vacillating, so courts trying to determine an individual belief should be mindful that beliefs may change. Following this test in Multani v Commission scolaire Marguerite‑Bourgeoys, the Court found freedom of religion should protect a non-violent Sikh student's right to wear a kirpan (dagger) in school.

In R v NS, the Supreme Court sought to find a middle ground on the issue of whether a witness can wear a face-covering niqāb while testifying in a criminal trial. The court found that the right to religious freedom must be balanced against the right of the accused to a fair trial.

=== Freedom of conscience ===
In addition to freedom of religion, section 2(a) also guarantees freedom of conscience. Professor Peter Hogg speculated this would include a right to atheism, despite the preamble to the Canadian Charter of Rights and Freedoms, which recognizes the "supremacy of God". The right has not spawned a great deal of case law, although Justice Bertha Wilson did rely on it in her opinion in R v Morgentaler. Finding laws against abortion to be a breach of the rights to liberty and security of the person under section 7 of the Charter, Wilson then argued this infringement could not be justified as being consistent with fundamental justice. The legal protections found under fundamental justice could be defined as including other rights under the Charter, and in particular abortion laws breached freedom of conscience. As she wrote, the "decision whether or not to terminate a pregnancy is essentially a moral decision, a matter of conscience". She then said, "[C]onscientious beliefs which are not religiously motivated are equally protected by freedom of conscience in s. 2(a)." No other judges joined Wilson's opinion.

Jean Chrétien, who was the attorney general during negotiations of the Charter, later recalled in his memoirs that freedom of conscience was nearly excluded from the Charter. The federal and provincial negotiators found the right too difficult to define, and Chrétien eventually agreed to remove it. A legal advisor for the federal government, Pierre Genest, then kicked Chrétien's chair, prompting Chrétien to joke, "I guess we leave it in. Trudeau's spy just kicked me in the ass."

== Freedom of expression ==
Freedom of expression, section 2(b), is perhaps one of the most significant Charter rights in influencing Canadian society. The right is expressly named in the charter because although "Canadian criminal law uses the standard of the reasonable person as a ... definition for the threshold of criminality", the Charter expressly limits some forms of expression. Justice Peter Cory wrote that it "is difficult to imagine a guaranteed right more important to a democratic society". The section has been at the centre of a great amount of case law.

=== Background ===
Freedom of speech had a limited background in Canada. It has been an issue in federalism disputes, as provincial legislation infringing upon free speech has been taken as criminal legislation, which only the Parliament of Canada can validly create under section 91(27) of the Constitution Act, 1867. Switzman v Elbling is an example of a case in which this was discussed. An Implied Bill of Rights theory further stated governments were limited in their abilities to infringe upon free speech under the preamble of the Constitution Act, 1867. This preamble states Canada's constitution would be based upon Britain's, and Britain had limited free speech in 1867. Furthermore, free speech is considered to be necessary for a parliamentary government to function.

Free speech was later included in the Canadian Bill of Rights.

=== Definition ===
The meaning of "expression" within section 2(b) has been read broadly as including any activity that conveys, or attempts to convey, meaning to the exception of acts of violence and threats of violence. However, the Courts have tried to maintain content neutrality by not considering the value of the expression. Instead, the content is only examined during the section 1 analysis.

Freedom of expression is primarily seen as a negative right. In Native Women's Association of Canada v Canada, the Court considered a claim that the government had to financially support an interest group in constitutional negotiations, as it had supported others. Section 28 (sexual equality under the Charter) was used to reinforce this argument, since the rights claimants were an interest group. Still, while the Supreme Court agreed discussions with the government is "unquestionably" a form of expression, the government did not seem to be guilty of suppressing any expression and thus the claim was dismissed.

=== Limiting the right ===
A law will be found to violate the freedom of expression where the law either has the purpose or effect of violating the right.

A law's purpose can limit the right either through limiting the content or form of expression. Limits on content are where the meaning of the expression is specifically forbidden by the law, such as hate-speech law, and is the most easily identifiable form of limitation. Limiting the form of the expression can often invoke section 2(b) as it will often have the effect of limiting the content as well.

Where a law does not intend to limit the freedom of expression it may still infringe section 2(b) through its effects. A law will be found to restrict expression if it has the effect of frustrating "the pursuit of truth, participation in the community, or individual self-fulfillment and human flourishing".

=== Commercial expression ===
Commercial expression is recognized as an activity protected under section 2(b). This includes advertising and any other similar means of expression used to sell goods and services. Even false or misleading advertising is protected. The value of the expression does not come into play until the section 1 analysis.

The protection of commercial expression was first established in Ford v Quebec (AG), where the Court struck down a Quebec law requiring all signs to be exclusively in French. This was soon followed by Irwin Toy, where the Court found that Quebec law prohibiting advertising to children violate section 2(b) but was saved under section 1.

The Supreme Court has also found that restrictions on advertising by professionals to be protected. As well, even communications for the purpose of prostitution was found to be protected as commercial expression.

=== Picketing ===
Protesting by labour groups and trade unions has long been recognized as a protected form of expression.

There are not many instances of limiting primary picketing. Typically, the debate has been over whether secondary picketing can be restricted; the practice of picketing businesses not directly involved in a labour dispute has in the past been banned under the common law. The most significant decision on limiting primary picketing is British Columbia Government Employees' Union v British Columbia (AG), where employees at the British Columbia Supreme Court, who were protesting as part of a province-wide public service employee strike, were ordered back to work by the Chief Justice of the court. The order was found to violate section 2(b) but the Supreme Court upheld it on section 1.

=== Freedom of thought, belief and opinion ===
Section 2(b) guarantees freedom of thought, belief and opinion in addition to freedom of expression. However, some have argued that freedoms of thought, belief and opinion in the Charter have had little practical consequence, and question whether governments can stifle unspoken thoughts in any case.

=== Application in the civil context ===
The need to protect freedom of expression is considered a guiding principle of interpretation in civil cases between individuals. In Crookes v. Newton, for example, the Supreme Court of Canada found that section 2(b) must be considered in determining the extent to which common law libel restrictions should apply to new technologies such as internet hyperlinks.

== Freedom of peaceful assembly ==
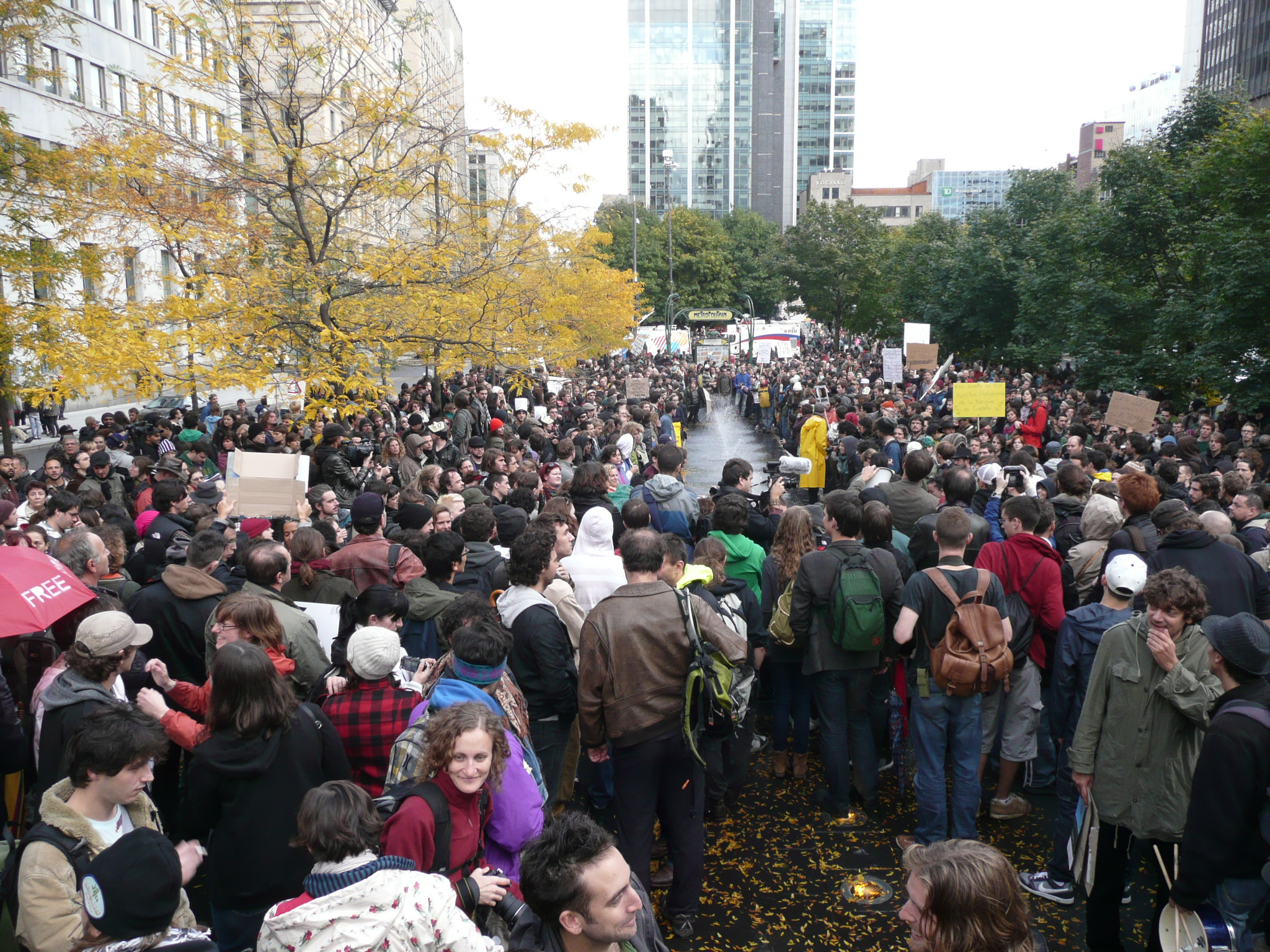
Occupy Canada stages a peaceful assembly in Victoria Square in Montreal.

Freedom of peaceful assembly under section 2(c) has not had a major impact on the case law. In Reference Re Public Service Employee Relations Act (Alta), the Supreme Court found that despite being written as a separate right, it was closely related to freedom of expression. The Nova Scotia Supreme Court defined it in Fraser et al v AGNS et al (1986) as including rights to meet as part of a committee or as workers. If there are membership fees to attend a meeting, prohibitions on being able to spend money for membership would be an abridgement of the right to peaceful assembly. In 2011, Occupy Canada's protests in public parks raised questions of whether their eviction was prohibited by freedom of assembly, as well as expression and association.

== Freedom of association ==
Freedom of association is guaranteed under section 2(d). This right provides individuals with the right to establish, belong to and maintain to any sort of organization unless that organization is otherwise illegal. Generally, this is used in the labour context where employees are given the right to associate with certain unions or another similar group to represent their interests in labour disputes or negotiations.

This right only protects the right of individuals to form associations and not associations themselves. Consequently, government legislation affecting the powers of established labour associations do not necessarily invoke section 2(d). It is only where legislation restricts the associative nature of the activity will section 2 be invoked. However, in the landmark Health Services and Support – Facilities Subsector Bargaining Association v British Columbia, the Supreme Court ruled that freedom of association guaranteed by section 2(d) includes a procedural right to collective bargaining. The Court ruled in this case that legislation that "substantially interferes" with the process of collective bargaining is a section 2(d) infringement. The test for "substantial interference" is twofold: (1) the importance of the matter affected to the process of collective bargaining, and more specifically, the capacity of union members to come together and pursue collective goals in concert; and (2) how the measure impacts on the collective right to good faith negotiation and consultation. It is not certain whether the decision in Health Services overturns jurisprudence arising from the so-called "labour trilogy" cases of 1987 which found that section 2(d) did not include a right to collective bargaining.

The Supreme Court has since found in Ontario (AG) v Fraser, that the right to collective bargaining does not require the government to take an active role in promoting and fostering collective bargaining, but merely to refrain from excessive interference with the collective bargaining process. In effect, the right to collective bargaining "guarantees a process, not a result". Fraser was affirmed and expanded upon by the Court of Appeal for Ontario in 2012 in Association of Justice Counsel v Canada (AG).

Typically, where a union is denied a right it does not preclude the employees from forming a separate association. In Delisle v Canada (Deputy AG), members of the Royal Canadian Mounted Police were excluded from the public services legislation. The Supreme Court held that they were not precluded from forming their association outside of the impugned legislation. However, in contrast, the decision of Dunmore v Ontario (AG) indicated that agricultural workers who were excluded from provincial labour relations legislation were entitled to be included because individually they were unable to form their associations, and consequently, this imposed a duty upon the government to include them. The Supreme Court overturned Delisle in Mounted Police Association of Ontario v Canada, concluding that the exclusion of RCMP members from collective bargaining was unconstitutional.

The freedom of association also includes the freedom not to associate. In certain employment circumstances, employees are required to contribute to a union as conditions of their employment (see Rand formula). However, mandatory associations do not invoke section 2(d) in and of themselves. In Lavigne, the Court found that the right not to be associated extended only to where the association supported causes that went beyond what is necessary for employee representation. More generally, the Supreme Court had stated that the right is violated only when the mandatory association imposes "ideological conformity". Such violations have also mostly been found by the Supreme Court to be justified under section 1, resulting in a right not to associate that has more theoretical than practical effects.

In Advance Cutting & Coring, the Supreme Court was called to examine the constitutional validity of a Quebec law that required all persons working in the province's construction industry to join a designated union. Eight of nine judges (Justice Claire L'Heureux-Dubé dissenting) confirmed that section 2 includes, to at least some degree, the negative right to not associate. With a majority of five judges to four, the Court determined that the law at issue violated this right. But with the same majority (judge Frank Iacobucci "switching camps" on the two issues and citing a "unique and complex historical context" in Quebec), the Court deemed the law to be justified in a free and democratic society under section 1 and thus constitutional.

== See also ==
- Censorship in Canada
- Religion in Canada
- R v Edwards Books and Art Ltd
