= R v Big M Drug Mart Ltd =

1982 Supreme Court of Canada decision

- Supreme Court of Canada

Hearing: March 6–7, 1984 Judgment: April 24, 1985
- Full case name: Her Majesty The Queen in Right of Canada v Big M Drug Mart Ltd
- Citations: [1985] 1 SCR 295, 18 DLR (4th) 321, 3 WWR 481, 18 CCC (3d) 385, 37 Alta LR (2d) 97
- Docket No.: 18125
- Prior history: Judgment for the defendant in the Court of Appeal of Alberta
- Ruling: Appeal dismissed

Holding
- The Lord's Day Act violates section 2 of the Charter and is therefore invalid.

Court membership
- Chief Justice: Bora Laskin; Puisne Justices: Roland Ritchie, Brian Dickson, Jean Beetz, Willard Estey, William McIntyre, Julien Chouinard, Antonio Lamer, Bertha Wilson

Reasons given
- Majority: Dickson (paras 1–151), joined by Beetz, McIntyre, Chouinard, and Lamer
- Concurrence: Wilson (paras 152–164)
- Laskin, Ritchie, and Estey took no part in the consideration or decision of the case.

R v Big M Drug Mart Ltd (Her Majesty The Queen in Right of Canada v Big M Drug Mart Ltd) is a landmark decision by Supreme Court of Canada where the Court struck down the federal Lord's Day Act for violating section 2 of the Canadian Charter of Rights and Freedoms. This case had many firsts in constitutional law including being the first to interpret section two.

== Background ==
In 1978, Nancy Lockhart and Michael Lasrado opened Big M Drug Mart, a 20,000 square foot (1,900 m^{2}) supermarket in the Forest Lawn community in Calgary. Big M and other stores remained open on Sundays despite the prohibition in the Lord's Day Act as revenue exceeded the small fines of between $15–$40 ($67–$179 in 2025).

On Sunday, May 30, 1982, Calgary police officers entered Big M Drug Mart and observed the sale of groceries, plastic cups, and a bicycle lock to customers in contravention of the federal Lord's Day Act. At the Provincial Court of Alberta, Justice Brian Stevenson acquitted Big M Drug Mart and found the legislation unconstitutional under section 2 of the Charter, striking down section 4 of the Lord's Day Act. At the Alberta Court of Appeal, the 3—2 majority written by Justice James Herbert Laycraft and concurred with by Justices Milt Harradence and William Stevenson upheld the Provincial Court's acquittal. The dissent by Justice R. Paul Belzil and concurred with by Chief Justice William A. McGillivray relied on the 1963 Supreme Court of Canada judgement in Robertson and Rosetanni, finding section 4 of the Lord's Day Act did not violate the Canadian Bill of Rights.

The constitutional question put before the Court was whether the Act infringed the right to freedom of conscience and religion, if so, whether it is justified under section 1 of the Charter, and whether the Act was intra vires ("within") Parliament's criminal power under section 91(27) of the Constitution Act, 1867.

== Ruling ==
The Supreme Court ruled that the statute was an unconstitutional violation of section 2 of the Canadian Charter of Rights and Freedoms, deciding that there was no true secular basis for the legislation and its only purpose was, in effect, to establish a state religious-based requirement, and was therefore invalid. The drug store's victory was made possible by section 52 of the Constitution Act, 1982, which provides that unconstitutional laws can be found invalid, as opposed to section 24 of the Charter, which is for those whose rights are violated. In as much as a corporation is not a natural person, it cannot have a religion and therefore the corporation's religious freedom was not violated.

In that case, Chief Justice Brian Dickson wrote that this freedom at least includes freedom of religious speech, including "the right to entertain such religious beliefs as a person chooses, the right to declare religious beliefs openly and without fear of hindrance or reprisal, and the right to manifest religious belief by worship and practice or by teaching and dissemination." Freedom of religion would also prohibit imposing religious requirements.

The Lord's Day Act was the first law in Charter jurisprudence to be struck down in its entirety, and some of the section 1 analysis in the decision played a role in developing the "Oakes test" in the later case R v Oakes.

== See also ==
- List of Supreme Court of Canada cases (Dickson Court)
- R v Edwards Books and Art Ltd (1986) - later Sunday closing law decision
- McGowan v. Maryland (1961) - Contrary US Supreme Court decision on blue laws, holding that laws originally passed for religious reasons may nonetheless be constitutional if they can be shown to fulfill a secular purpose
