= R v Edwards Books and Art Ltd =

Supreme Court of Canada decision

- Supreme Court of Canada

Hearing: March 4–6, 1986 Judgment: December 18, 1986
- Full case name: Her Majesty The Queen v Edwards Books and Art Limited, Nortown Foods Limited, Longo Brothers Fruit Markets Limited, and Paul Magder
- Citations: [1986] 2 SCR 713

Court membership
- Chief Justice: Brian Dickson; Puisne Justices: Jean Beetz, Willard Estey, William McIntyre, Julien Chouinard, Antonio Lamer, Bertha Wilson, Gerald Le Dain, Gérard La Forest

Reasons given
- Majority: Dickson CJ, joined by Chouinard and Le Dain JJ
- Concurrence: La Forest J and Beetz J, joined by McIntyre J
- Dissent: Wilson J

R v Edwards Books and Art Ltd [1986] 2 SCR 713 is a leading Supreme Court of Canada decision on the constitutional validity of an Ontario provincial Sunday closing law. The Court found that the legislation was within the power of the province to legislate but it was in violation of the right to freedom of religion under section 2(a) of the Canadian Charter of Rights and Freedoms ("Charter"). However, it could be saved under section 1.

Three issues were before the Court:

1. Whether the Act was within the legislative powers of the province provided by section 92 of the Constitution Act, 1867
2. Whether any part of the Act violated sections 2(a), 7, or 15 of the Charter
3. Whether any violation could be saved under section 1

The Court found that the law was within the power of the province, that it violated section 2(a), but could be saved under section 1. They dismissed the appeals of Edwards, Longo and Magder, and allowed the Crown's appeal of the Nortown decision, entering a conviction against.

== Decision of the Court ==
The majority decision was written by Dickson CJ, with Chouinard and LeDain JJ concurring. La Forest J wrote concurring reasons, agreeing with Dickson CJ's judgement with a slight disagreement on his application of section 1. Beetz J, with McIntyre J concurring, wrote reasons concurring in the result agreeing with Dickson CJ's result but for different results, finding found that there was no violation of section 2(a).

=== Dickson ===
Dickson analyzed the pith and substance of the law in order to determine if the law can be characterized as a provincial power or a federal power. This analysis focused on the nature of the Act, whether it was religious in nature or secular in nature (i.e.. related to civil and property rights). He concluded that it was secular in nature.

Dickson noted that the act was not attempting to advance any religious ideology, but rather was intending to provide employees with a day of rest. The choice of Sunday is not determinative of a religious purpose; other countries use Sunday as a day of rest for entirely secular reasons. The exemption for people of the Jewish faith is not sufficient to show a religious purpose either.

Turning to the second issue, Dickson found a marginal violation of section 2(a) with respect to Nortown only. A company that has a legitimate and sincere religious practice that requires them to open a store on Sunday has the right to do so. The provision that attempts to accommodate those of the Jewish faith was insufficient to catch all sincere religious practitioners and so violated section 2(a). A law that indirectly places a burden on an individual or group that has the effect of degrading their ability to practise their religion is in violation of the Charter. Here, the law was requiring the store owner to choose between their religion or their business and so was degrading to their faith.

Regarding section 7 and 15, Dickson found that there was no deprivation of liberty or adverse impact to violate section 7, and he also found that there could be no section 15 claim as the section had not yet come into effect at the time of the charge.

On the third issue, Dickson found that the violation could be justified under section 1. In applying the Oakes test, he found that the purpose of giving people a day of rest was clearly pressing and substantial, as the well-being of all workers is important, especially those in the retail industry. He found that the law was proportional as well. The law corresponded to the objective of giving all workers a day of rest, and the availability of exceptions provided for minimal impairment.

=== La Forest ===
La Forest agreed with everything Dickson found except for his interpretation of section 1. La Forest stated that focus must be put on deference to government to pursue its objectives, and on this basis the government should not have to worry as much about being as minimally impairing as Dickson suggested.

=== Beetz ===
Beetz held that the legislation was not the cause of the problem. The religious issue was due to the Saturday observer's choice of "religious tenets over economic benefit". Even if there were no universal day of rest, Saturday observers would still be economically disadvantaged as opposed to businesses which opted to stay open all seven days. There was therefore no breach of s. 2(a).

== Dissent ==
Wilson J was the lone dissenter, finding that the Act violated section 2(a) and could not be saved under section 1. Like La Forest, she agreed with Dickson's reasoning on the first two issues, however she did not agree with the analysis of section 1.

Wilson focused on the proportionality of the law. She found that the accommodations were insufficient. They were too selective, excluding important segments of the population, and created arbitrary classes of people.

== See also ==
- List of Supreme Court of Canada cases (Dickson Court)
