= Reasons of the Supreme Court of Canada by Justice LeBel =

This is a list of all the opinions written by Louis LeBel during his tenure as puisne justice of the Supreme Court of Canada.

== 2000 ==
Louis LeBel 2000 statistics

4	Majority or Plurality	0	Concurrence	0	Other
0	Dissent	1	Concurrence/dissent	Total =	5
Written opinions = 4		Oral opinions = 1		Unanimous opinions = ?

	Case name	Issue	Co-authored by	Joined by
o	R v Caouette [2000] 2 SCR 271; 2000 SCC 41	Admissibility	None	Unanimous
	Blencoe v British Columbia (Human Rights Commission) [2000] 2 SCR 307; 2000 SCC 44	Abuse of process, Charter, security of person, Human Rights Commissions	None	Iacobucci, Binnie and Arbour JJ
o	Syndicat de l'enseignement du Grand-Portage v Morency [2000] 2 SCR 913; 2000 SCC 62	Labour law, judicial review	None	Unanimous
	Pacific National Investments Ltd v Victoria (City of) [2000] 2 SCR 919; 2000 SCC 64	Zoning law	None	Gonthier, Iacobucci and Arbour JJ
	R v Araujo [2000] 2 SCR 992; 2000 SCC 65	Appeals; interception of communications	None	Unanimous

== 2001 ==
Louis LeBel 2001 statistics

7	Majority or Plurality	1	Concurrence	0	Other
5	Dissent	1	Concurrence/dissent	Total =	14
Written reasons = ?		Oral reasons = ?		Unanimous reasons = ?

Case name	Issue	Co-authored by	Joined by
R v Parrott [2001] 1 SCR 178; 2001 SCC 3	Hearsay exceptions; expert witnesses	None	L'Heureux-Dubé and Gonthier JJ
Ellis-Don Ltd v Ontario (Labour Relations Board) [2001] 1 SCR 221; 2001 SCC 4	Judicial review, natural justice	None	McLachlin CJ and L'Heureux‑Dubé, Gonthier, Iacobucci, Bastarache and Arbour JJ
R v Ruzic [2001] 1 SCR 687; 2001 SCC 24	Defence of duress; security of person; Charter	None	Unanimous
Noël v Société d'énergie de la Baie James [2001] 2 SCR 207; 2001 SCC 39	Labour relations	None	Unanimous
114957 Canada Ltée (Spraytech, Société d'arrosage) v Hudson (Town of) [2001] 2 SCR 241; 2001 SCC 40	Municipal laws	None	Unanimous
Boston v Boston [2001] 2 SCR 413; 2001 SCC 43	Double recovery in spousal support from pensions	None	L'Heureux-Dubé J
Marcoux v Bouchard [2001] 2 SCR 726; 2001 SCC 50	Physician responsibility; consent of patient	None	Unanimous
Lac d'Amiante du Québec Ltée v 2858-0702 Québec Inc [2001] 2 SCR 743; 2001 SCC 51	Physician responsibility; consent of patient	None	Unanimous
Singleton v Canada [2001] 2 SCR 1046; 2001 SCC 61	Tax deductions	None	Bastarache J
Ludco Enterprises Ltd v Canada [2001] 2 SCR 1082; 2001 SCC 62	Income tax deductions	None	None
R v Advance Cutting & Coring Ltd [2001] 3 SCR 209; 2001 SCC 70	Charter; right of association	None	Gonthier and Arbour JJ
R v Rhee [2001] 3 SCR 364; 2001 SCC 71	Charge to jury; reasonable doubt standard	None	None
R v Khan [2001] 3 SCR 823; 2001 SCC 86	Right of appeal	None	None
Prévost-Masson v General Trust of Canada [2001] 3 SCR 882; 2001 SCC 87	Professional liability; Chartered accountant	None	Unanimous

== 2002 ==
Louis LeBel 2002 statistics

11	Majority or Plurality	3	Concurrence	1	Other
3	Dissent	1	Concurrence/dissent	Total =	19
Written reasons = ?		Oral reasons = ?		Unanimous reasons = ?

Case name	Issue	Co-authored by	Joined by
Retail, Wholesale and Department Store Union, Local 558 v Pepsi-Cola Canada Beverages (West) Ltd [2002] 1 SCR 156; 2002 SCC 8	secondary picketing; freedom of expression; Charter	McLachlin CJ	Unanimous
R v Regan [2002] 1 SCR 297; 2002 SCC 12	Abuse of process; Appellate remedies	None	McLachlin, L'Heureux-Dubé, Gonthier and Bastarache JJ
R v Guignard [2002] 1 SCR 472; 2002 SCC 14	Charter; freedom of expression; signs	None	Unanimous
Whiten v Pilot Insurance Co [2002] 1 SCR 595; 2002 SCC 18	Punitive damages; charge to jury	None	None
Performance Industries Ltd v Sylvan Lake Golf & Tennis Club Ltd [2002] 1 S.C.R. 678; 2002 SCC 19	Rectification of contract; punitive damages	None	None
Goulet v Transamerica Life Insurance Co of Canada [2002] 1 SCR 719; 2002 SCC 21	Exception to life insurance for public order	None	Unanimous
Lavoie v Canada [2002] 1 SCR 769; 2002 SCC 23	Charter, equality rights; citizenship	None	None
Kitkatla Band v British Columbia (Minister of Small Business, Tourism and Culture) [2002] 2 SCR 146; 2002 SCC 31	Aboriginal heritage; federalism	None	Unanimous
Tremblay v Syndicat des employées et employés professionnels-les et de bureau, section locale 57 [2002] 2 SCR 627; 2002 SCC 44	Union representation; Charter, equality of salaries	None	Unanimous
RC v Quebec (AG); R v Beauchamps [2002] 2 SCR 762; 2002 SCC 52	Counsel fees	None	Unanimous
Ross River Dena Council Band v Canada [2002] 2 SCR 816; 2002 SCC 54	Indian reserves	None	Gonthier, Iacobucci, Major, Binnie, and Arbour JJ
CIBC Mortgage Corp v Vasquez [2002] 3 SCR 168; 2002 SCC 60	Exercise of hypothecary rights	None	None
Lavallée, Rackel & Heintz v Canada (AG); White, Ottenheimer & Baker v Canada (AG); R v Fink [2002] 3 SCR 209; 2002 SCC 61	Charter, section 8, unreasonable search or seizure; solicitor-client privilege	None	L'Heureux-Dubé and Gonthier JJ
Schreiber v Canada (AG) [2002] 3 SCR 269; 2002 SCC 62	Sovereign immunity; statutory interpretation	None	Unanimous
Macdonell v Quebec (Commission d'accès à l'information) [2002] 3 SCR 661; 2002 SCC 71	Judicial review; access to information	Bastarache J	Major and Binnie JJ
Quebec (AG) v Laroche [2002] 3 SCR 708; 2002 SCC 72	Charter, section 8; seizure of proceeds of a crime	None	L'Heureux-Dubé, Gonthier, Iacobucci and Bastarache JJ
Spar Aerospace Ltd v American Mobile Satellite Corp [2002] 4 SCR 205; 2002 SCC 78	forum non conveniens in Quebec	None	Unanimous
Gosselin v Québec (AG) [2002] 4 SCR 429; 2002 SCC 84	Financial assistance; Charter rights	None	None
Prud'homme v Prud'homme [2002] 4 SCR 663; 2002 SCC 85	Defamation	L'Heureux-Dubé J	Unanimous
Chamberlain v Surrey School District No 36 [2002] 4 SCR 710; 2002 SCC 86	Selection of books for use in classrooms; religious freedoms	None	None

== 2003 ==
Louis LeBel 2003 statistics

?	Majority or Plurality	?	Concurrence	?	Other
?	Dissent	?	Concurrence/dissent	Total =	?
Written reasons= ?		Oral reasons = ?		Unanimous reasons= ?

	Case name	Issue	Co-authored by	Joined by
	R v Zinck [2003] 1 SCR 41; 2003 SCC 6	Sentencing	None	Unanimous
	Allen v Alberta [2003] 1 SCR 128; 2003 SCC 13	Labour law, jurisdiction	None	Unanimous
	Desputeaux v Éditions Chouette (1987) inc [2003] 1 SCR 178; 2003 SCC 17	Arbitration	None	Unanimous
	Miglin v Miglin [2003] 1 SCR 303; 2003 SCC 24	Spousal support; variation of agreements	None	Deschamps J
	Figueroa v Canada (AG) [2003] 1 SCR 912; 2003 SCC 37	Charter; right to vote	None	Gonthier and Deschamps JJ
	Wewaykum Indian Band v Canada [2003] 2 SCR 259; 2003 SCC 45	Reasonable apprehension of bias	Unanimous	None
o	R v Bédard [2003] 2 SCR 621; 2003 SCC 56	Evidence	None	Unanimous
	Imperial Oil Ltd v Quebec (Minister of the Environment) [2003] 2 SCR 624; 2003 SCC 58	Conflict of interest; environment	None	Unanimous
	Doucet-Boudreau v Nova Scotia (Minister of Education) [2003] 3 SCR 3; 2003 SCC 62	Charter remedies	Deschamps J	Major and Binnie JJ
	Toronto (City of) v Canadian Union of Public Employees, Local 79 [2003] 3 SCR 77; 2003 SCC 63	Labour arbitration; judicial review	None	Deschamps J
	Ontario v Ontario Public Sector Employees Union [2003] 3 SCR 149; 2003 SCC 64	Labour arbitration; judicial review	None	Deschamps J
	Maranda v Richer [2003] 3 SCR 193; 2003 SCC 67	Search warrants; solicitor-client privilege	None	McLachlin CJ, Gothier, Iacobucci, Major, Bastarache, Binnie and Arbour JJ
	R v Taillefer; R v Duguay [2003] 3 SCR 307; 2003 SCC 70	Evidence; Charter, right to full answer and defence	None	Unanimous
	British Columbia (Minister of Forests) v Okanagan Indian Band [2003] 3 SCR 371; 2003 SCC 71	Costs; appeals	None	McLachlin CJ, Gonthier, Binnie, Arbour, LeBel and Deschamps JJ
	Beals v Saldanha [2003] 3 SCR 416; 2003 SCC 72	Enforcement of foreign judgments	Binnie J	Iacobucci J
	R v Malmo-Levine; R v Caine [2003] 3 SCR 571; 2003 SCC 74	Criminalization of marijuana; Charter rights	None	None
	R v Clay [2003] 3 SCR 735; 2003 SCC 75	Criminalization of marijuana; Charter rights	None	None

== 2004 ==
Louis LeBel 2004 statistics

11	Majority or Plurality	5	Concurrence	0	Other
5	Dissent	?	Concurrence/dissent	Total =	21
Written reasons = ?		Oral reasons = ?		Unanimous reasons = ?

	Case name	Issue	Co-authored by	Joined by
o	9050-3400 Québec Inc v Riverin, Girard & Associés Inc [2004] 1 SCR 301; 2004 SCC 8	Insurance in Quebec	None	Unanimous
	Foster Wheeler Power Co v Société intermunicipale de gestion et d'élimination des déchets (SIGED) inc [2004] 1 SCR 456; 2004 SCC 18	Professional secrecy; lawyers	None	Unanimous
	Voice Construction Ltd v Construction & General Workers' Union, Local 92 [2004] 1 SCR 609; 2004 SCC 23	Judicial review; labour law	None	Deschamps J
	Cartaway Resources Corp (Re) [2004] 1 SCR 672; 2004 SCC 26	Judicial review; securities	None	Unanimous
	Quebec (Commission des droits de la personne et des droits de la jeunesse) v Communauté urbaine de Montréal [2004] 1 SCR 789; 2004 SCC 30	Civil rights, discriminatory hiring	None	Unanimous
	Bibaud v Québec (Régie de l'assurance maladie) [2004] 2 SCR 3; 2004 SCC 35	Quebec civil procedure	None	Unanimous
	Finney v Barreau du Québec [2004] 2 SCR 17; 2004 SCC 36	Lawyer society; professional immunity	None	Unanimous
	British Columbia v Canadian Forest Products Ltd [2004] 2 SCR 74; 2004 SCC 38	Environmental damages	None	Bastarache and Fish JJ
	Application under s 83.28 of the Criminal Code (Re) [2004] 2 SCR 248; 2004 SCC 42	Anti-terrorism laws	None	Fish J
	Vancouver Sun (Re) [2004] 2 SCR 332; 2004 SCC 43	Investigative hears, terrorism, open courts	None	None
	R v Kerr [2004] 2 SCR 371; 2004 SCC 44	Weapon offences	None	Arbour J
	Society of Composers, Authors and Music Publishers of Canada v Canadian Assn of Internet Providers [2004] 2 SCR 427; 2004 SCC 45	Intermediary liability; internet; extraterritoriality	None	None
	R v Demers [2004] 2 SCR 489; 2004 SCC 46	Criminal law, Mental capacity; Charter rights	None	None
	Congrégation des témoins de Jéhovah de St-Jérôme-Lafontaine v Lafontaine (Village of) [2004] 2 SCR 650; 2004 SCC 48	Municipal law; freedom of religion	None	Bastarache and Deschamps JJ
	Gilles E Néron Communication Marketing Inc v Chambre des notaires du Québec [2004] 3 SCR 95; 2004 SCC 53	Defamation over television	None	McLachlin CJ and Iacobucci, Major, Bastarache and Deschamps JJ
	Cabiakman v Industrial Alliance Life Insurance Co [2004] 3 SCR 195; 2004 SCC 55	Employment law; extortion	Fish J	Unanimous
	Épiciers Unis Métro-Richelieu Inc, division "Éconogros" v Collin [2004] 3 SCR 257; 2004 SCC 59	Termination of suretyship; Quebec civil code	None	Unanimous
	Glykis v Hydro-Québec [2004] 3 SCR 285; 2004 SCC 60	Interruption of public services	Fish J	None
	Entreprises Sibeca Inc v Frelighsburg (Municipality of) [2004] 3 SCR 304; 2004 SCC 61	Zoning by-laws; immunity	None	Fish J
	Lefebvre (Trustee of); Tremblay (Trustee of) [2004] 3 SCR 326; 2004 SCC 63	Bankruptcy	None	Unanimous
	Ouellet (Trustee of) [2004] 3 SCR 348; 2004 SCC 64	Bankruptcy	None	Unanimous

== 2005 ==
Louis LeBel 2005 statistics

7	Majority or Plurality	3	Concurrence	0	Other
3	Dissent	1	Concurrence/dissent	Total =	14
Written opinions = ?		Oral opinions = ?		Unanimous opinions = ?

Case name	Issue	Co-authored by	Joined by
UL Canada Inc v Quebec (AG) [2005] 1 SCR 143; 2005 SCC 10	Federalism; Charter, freedom of expression; colour of margarine	None	Unanimous
R v Mapara [2005] 1 SCR 358; 2005 SCC 23	Double hearsay; interception of communication	None	Fish J
Glegg v Smith & Nephew Inc [2005] 1 SCR 724; 2005 SCC 31	Professional secrecy of medical records	None	Unanimous
Chaoulli v Quebec (AG) [2005] 1 S.C.R. 791; 2005 SCC 35	Charter rights, hospital wait times	Binnie J	Fish J
R v Orbanski; R v Elias [2005] 2 SCR 3; 2005 SCC 37	Police powers, roadside stops; Charter rights	None	Fish J
Mugesera v Canada (Minister of Citizenship and Immigration) [2005] 2 SCR 100; 2005 SCC 40	Judicial review; deportation; hate crimes	Unanimous	None
R v Marshall; R v Bernard [2005] 2 S.C.R. 220; 2005 SCC 43	Aboriginal treaty and title, logging rights	None	Fish J
GreCon Dimter inc v J R Normand inc [2005] 2 SCR 401; 2005 SCC 46	Choice of law; Quebec private international law	None	Unanimous
Boucher v Stelco Inc [2005] 3 SCR 279; 2005 SCC 64	Pensions	None	Unanimous
Kirkbi AG v Ritvik Holdings Inc; 2005 SCC 65	Trade-marks	None	Unanimous
R v CD; R v CDK [2005] 3 SCR 668; 2005 SCC 78	Sentencing youth	None	None
R v Labaye [2005] 3 SCR 728; 2005 SCC 80	Indecency	Bastarache J	None
R v Kouri [2005] 3 SCR 789; 2005 SCC 81	Indecency	Bastarache J	None
May v Ferndale Institution [2005] 3 SCR 809; 2005 SCC 82	Procudural rights in transfer of prisoners	Fish J	McLachlin CJ and Binnie, Deschamps and Abella JJ

== 2006 ==
Louis LeBel 2006 statistics

5	Majority or Plurality	2	Concurrence	0	Other
2	Dissent	0	Concurrence/dissent	Total =	9
Written reasons= ?		Oral reasons = ?		Unanimous reasons = ?

Case name	Issue	Co-authored by	Joined by
Canada (Human Rights Commission) v Canadian Airlines International Ltd [2006] 1 SCR 3; 2006 SCC 1	Discrimination, equal wages	Abella J	Unanimous
Isidore Garon ltée v Tremblay; Fillion et Frères (1976) inc v Syndicat national des employés de garage du Québec inc [2006] 1 SCR 27; 2006 SCC 2	Labour law, termination	None	McLachlin CJ and Fish J
Multani v Commission scolaire Marguerite-Bourgeoys [2006] 1 SCR 256; 2006 SCC 6	Judicial review; freedom of religion	None	None
Lévis (City of) v Tétreault; Lévis (City of) v 2629-4470 Québec inc [2006] 1 SCR 420; 2006 SCC 12	Motor vehicle offences; officially induced error	None	Unanimous
R v Graveline [2006] 1 SCR 609; 2006 SCC 16	Overturning jury verdicts	None	None
Bisaillon v Concordia University [2006] 1 SCR 666; 2006 SCC 19	Labour law; pension plans		Deschamps, Abella and Charron JJ
Placer Dome Canada Ltd v Ontario (Minister of Finance) [2006] 1 SCR 715; 2006 SCC 20	Mining taxation	None	Unanimous
Jesuit Fathers of Upper Canada v Guardian Insurance Co of Canada [2006] 1 SCR 744; 2006 SCC 21	Insurance law, liability policies	None	Unanimous
Mattel, Inc v 3894207 Canada Inc [2006] 1 SCR 722; 2006 SCC 22	Trade-mark confusion	None	None
Robertson v Thomson Corp [2006] 2 SCR 363; 2006 SCC 43	Copyright infringement; licensing	Fish J	Bastarache, Deschamps and Rothstein JJ
R v Shoker [2006] 2 SCR 399; 2006 SCC 44	Sentencing, probation	None	Bastarache J
Imperial Oil Ltd v Canada; Inco Ltd v Canada _ S.C.R. _; 2006 SCC 46	Income tax	None	McLachlin CJ and Deschamps and Abella JJ
Pharmascience Inc v Binet _ S.C.R. _; 2006 SCC 48	Professional ethics	None	McLachlin CJ and Bastarache, Binnie, Deschamps, Charron and Rothstein JJ

== 2010 ==
Statistics

XXXXX	Majority or Plurality	XXX	Concurrence	XXXX	Other
XXXX	Dissent	XXXX	Concurrence/dissent	Total =	XXXXXX
Written opinions = XXX		Oral opinions = XXX		Unanimous decisions = XXX

Case name	Issue	Co-authored by	Joined by
XXX; CITATIONS [URL]	XXX	XXX	XXX
XXX; CITATIONS [URL]	XXX	XXX	XXX

== 2011 ==
Statistics

XXXXX	Majority or Plurality	XXX	Concurrence	XXXX	Other
XXXX	Dissent	XXXX	Concurrence/dissent	Total =	XXXXXX
Written opinions = XXX		Oral opinions = XXX		Unanimous decisions = XXX

Case name	Issue	Co-authored by	Joined by
R v Bruce; 2011 SCC 4	Reasonableness of trial verdict	–	Deschamps, Abella, Charron, Rothstein and Cromwell JJ
Quebec (AG) v Canada; 2011 SCC 11	Whether social services provided in schools were "welfare services" within the meaning of the Canada Assistance Plan federal-provincial welfare costs-sharing agreement	–	Unanimous
Seidel v TELUS Communications Inc; 2011 SCC 15	XXX	Deschamps J	Abella and Charron JJ
Ontario (AG) v Fraser; 2011 SCC 20	Whether separate labour relations legislation governing agricultural workers in Ontario infringes freedom of association under s. 2(d) of the Charter by failing to establish a meaningful process of collective bargaining	McLachlin CJ	Binnie, Fish and Cromwell JJ
Canada (Information Commissioner) v Canada (Minister of National Defence); 2011 SCC 25	Access to information	–	–
Schreyer v Schreyer; 2011 SCC 35	Effect of bankruptcy and discharge on equalization payment	–	Unanimous
R v Sinclair; 2011 SCC 40	XXX	–	Deschamps and Rothstein JJ
R v Katigbak; 2011 SCC 48	Possession of child pornography and statutory defences	–	Fish J
R v Dorfer; 2011 SCC 50	Whether trial judge erred in his instruction to the jury about the limited use of third party suspect's criminal record and if so, whether this error constituted a miscarriage of justice	–	Fish J
Canada (Canadian Human Rights Commission) v Canada (AG); 2011 SCC 53	Whether standard of reasonableness applies to a human rights tribunal's decision to award costs, and whether the tribunal made a reviewable error in awarding costs to the complainant — Whether federal human rights tribunal has jurisdiction to award costs	Cromwell JJ	Unanimous
R v Bouchard-Lebrun; 2011 SCC 58	Whether a toxic psychosis whose symptoms are caused by a state of self-induced intoxication can be a "mental disorder" for the purpose of the defence of not criminally responsible on account of mental disorder	–	Unanimous

== 2012 ==
Statistics

13	Majority or Plurality	1	Concurrence	0	Other
4	Dissent	0	Concurrence/dissent	Total =	18
Written opinions = 15		Oral opinions = 3		Unanimous decisions = 11

Case name	Issue	Co-authored by	Joined by
Toronto-Dominion Bank v Canada; 2012 SCC 1	Taxation and bankruptcy and insolvency	–	Unanimous (oral)
SL v Commission scolaire des Chênes; 2012 SCC 7	Whether refusal of school board to exempt children from ethics and religious culture course infringed freedom of religion under s. 2(a) of the Charter	–	Fish J
Richard v Time Inc; 2012 SCC 8	Consumer protection and false or misleading representations under the Quebec Consumer Protection Act	Cromwell J	Unanimous
R v Ipeelee; 2012 SCC 13	Principles governing the sentencing of aboriginal offenders	–	McLachlin CJ and Binnie, Deschamps, Fish and Abella JJ
Éditions Écosociété Inc v Banro Corp; 2012 SCC 18	Choice of forum and forum non conveniens	–	Unanimous
Club Resorts Ltd v Van Breda; 2012 SCC 17	Choice of forum and forum non conveniens	–	Unanimous
Breeden v Black; 2012 SCC 19	Choice of forum and forum non conveniens	–	Unanimous
Cinar Corp v Robinson; 2012 SCC 25	Whether applicants on application for leave to the Supreme Court of Canada must provide security for amounts they would have to pay should their appeals be unsuccessful	–	Unanimous
Westmount (City of) v Rossy; 2012 SCC 30	No-fault public automobile insurance scheme under the Quebec Automobile Insurance Act; Whether driver's injuries were "caused by an automobile, by the use thereof or by the load carried in or on an automobile"	–	Unanimous
Clements v Clements; 2012 SCC 32	Tort of negligence and appropriate test for factual causation	–	Rothstein J
Re:Sound v Motion Picture Theatre Associations of Canada; 2012 SCC 38	Intellectual property and whether a pre-existing recording into the soundtrack of a cinematographic work constitutes a "sound recording" subject to the payment of a tariff under the Copyright Act	–	Unanimous
R v Picot; 2012 SCC 54	Whether the trial judge's failure to consider testimony on collateral matters which may have bolstered credibility of complainant constitutes an error of law	–	Unanimous (oral)
R v Nedelcu; 2012 SCC 59	Whether Crown at criminal trial may cross examine an accused on prior inconsistent statements without infringing the right against self-incrimination under s. 13 of the Charter	–	Fish and Cromwell JJ
Teva Canada Ltd v Pfizer Canada Inc; 2012 SCC 60	Intellectual property and whether patent application met disclosure requirements under s. 27(3) of the Patent Act	–	Unanimous
R v DJW; 2012 SCC 63	Appeal of convictions for aggravated assault and assault with a weapon and a stay of conviction for criminal negligence causing bodily harm	–	Unanimous (oral)
R v Aucoin; 2012 SCC 66	Whether pat-down search was unreasonable under s. 8 of the Charter; Whether detention of the accused was unlawful under s. 9 of the Charter; Whether evidence ought to be excluded pursuant to s. 24(2) of the Charter	–	Fish J
Newfoundland and Labrador v AbitibiBowater Inc; 2012 SCC 67	Bankruptcy and insolvency and whether the federal Companies' Creditors Arrangement Act is ultra vires by permitting courts to determine whether an environmental order is a monetary claim	–	–
R v NS; 2012 SCC 72	Whether requiring witness to remove niqab while testifying would interfere with her religious freedom under s. 2(a) of the Charter; Whether permitting witness to wear niqab while testifying would create a serious risk to trial fairness under s. 11(d) of the Charter	–	Rothstein J

== 2013 ==
Statistics

12	Majority or Plurality	0	Concurrence	0	Other
5	Dissent	0	Concurrence/dissent	Total =	17
Written opinions = 15		Oral opinions = 2		Unanimous decisions = 10

Case name	Issue	Co-authored by	Joined by
R v Ryan; 2013 SCC 3	Criminal defence of duress	Cromwell J	McLachlin CJ and Deschamps, Abella, Rothstein, Moldaver and Karakatsanis JJ
Quebec (AG) v A 2013 SCC 5	Discrimination based on marital status under s. 15(1) of the Charter	–	Fish, Rothstein and Moldaver JJ
Sun Indalex Finance, LLC v United Steelworkers; 2013 SCC 6	Pensions and bankruptcy and insolvency	–	Abella J
Penner v Niagara (Regional Police Services Board); 2013 SCC 19	Issue estoppel: administrative tribunal proceedings and civil proceedings	Abella J	Rothstein J
R v Murphy; 2013 SCC 21	Reasonableness of trial verdict	–	Unanimous (oral)
R v Lévesque; 2013 SCC 20	Appropriateness of jury charge	–	Unanimous (oral)
Behn v Moulton Contracting Ltd; 2013 SCC 26	Standing of aboriginal persons to claim as a tort defence the Crown's failure of its duty to consult	–	Unanimous
Agraira v Canada (Public Safety and Emergency Preparedness); 2013 SCC 36	Judicial review of decision of Minister of Immigration	–	Unanimous
Ezokola v Canada (Citizenship and Immigration); 2013 SCC 40	Rejection of refugee applicant on grounds of complicity in crimes against humanity; Whether passive acquiescence is sufficient to establish complicity	Fish J	Unanimous
Marine Services International Ltd v Ryan Estate; 2013 SCC 44	Division of powers – Whether negligence action brought by dependents under federal maritime legislation is prohibited by provincial workers' compensation legislation	Karakatsanis J	Unanimous
Divito v Canada (Public Safety and Emergency Preparedness); 2013 SCC 47	Constitutional challenge of provisions of the International Transfer of Offenders Act under mobility rights under s. 6(1) of the Charter	Fish J	McLachlin CJ
R v MacKenzie; 2013 SCC 50	Unreasonable search and seizure and exclusion of evidence under ss. 8 and 24(2) of the Charter	–	McLachlin CJ and Fish and Cromwell JJ
R v RL; 2013 SCC 54	Application for extension of time to appeal convictions	–	Unanimous
Infineon Technologies AG v Option consommateurs 2013 SCC 59	Civil procedure – Class actions and court jurisdiction	–	Unanimous
Quebec (Agence du Revenu) v Services Environnementaux AES inc 2013 SCC 65	Contractual interpretation and intention of contracting parties	–	Unanimous
Amaratunga v Northwest Atlantic Fisheries Organization; 2013 SCC 66	Public international law and jurisdictional immunity	–	Unanimous
Wood v Schaeffer; 2013 SCC 71	Whether police officers have right to consult with counsel before making notes on an incident; Whether police officers are entitled to basic legal advice as to the nature of rights and obligations in connection with an incident	Cromwell J	Fish J

== 2014 ==
Statistics

10	Majority or Plurality	0	Concurrence	0	Other
1	Dissent	0	Concurrence/dissent	Total =	11
Written opinions = 9		Oral opinions = 2		Unanimous decisions = 5

Case name	Issue	Co-authored by	Joined by
Vivendi Canada Inc v Dell'Aniello; 2014 SCC 1	Authorization of class actions	Wagner J	Unanimous
R v MacDonald; 2014 SCC 3	Unreasonable search and seizure	–	McLachlin CJ and Fish and Abella JJ
R v Davis; 2014 SCC 4	Powers of appellate courts	–	Unanimous (oral)
R v Sekhon; 2014 SCC 15	Admissibility of expert evidence	–	McLachlin CJ
Reference Re Supreme Court Act, ss 5 and 6; 2014 SCC 21	Eligibility requirements to the Supreme Court of Canada	McLachlin CJ and Abella, Cromwell, Karakatsanis and Wagner JJ	–
R v Leinen; 2014 SCC 23	Proper jury instruction on panic attack defence	–	Unanimous (oral)
Mission Institution v Khela; 2014 SCC 24	Jurisdiction of courts	–	Unanimous
United Food and Commercial Workers, Local 503 v Wal-Mart Canada Corp; 2014 SCC 45	Judicial review of labour arbitration decision and employer's unilateral change of employment conditions under s. 59 of the Quebec Labour Code	–	McLachlin CJ and Abella, Cromwell and Karakatsanis JJ
Canada (AG) v Confédération des syndicats nationaux 2014 SCC 49	Motions to dismiss	Wagner J	Unanimous
Kazemi Estate v Islamic Republic of Iran; 2014 SCC 62	Public international law and sovereign immunity	–	McLachlin CJ and Rothstein, Cromwell, Moldaver and Karakatsanis JJ
Imperial Oil v Jacques; 2014 SCC 66	Whether a party to a civil proceeding can request disclosure of recordings of private communications intercepted by the state in the course of a criminal investigation	Wagner J	–

== 2015 ==
Statistics

2	Majority or Plurality	0	Concurrence	0	Other
1	Dissent	0	Concurrence/dissent	Total =	3
Written opinions = 3		Oral opinions = 0		Unanimous decisions = 0

Case name	Issue	Co-authored by	Joined by
Mounted Police Association of Ontario v Canada (AG); 2015 SCC 1	Right to collective bargaining under s. 2(d) of the Charter; Whether impugned legislation excluding RCMP members from public services labour relations regime substantially interferes with the right to a meaningful process of collective bargaining	McLachlin CJ	Abella, Cromwell, Karakatsanis and Wagner JJ
Meredith v Canada (AG); 2015 SCC 2	Whether the statutory limit on wages increases in the public sector under the Expenditure Restraint Act infringes claimants' rights to a meaningful process of collective bargaining under s. 2(d) of the Charter	McLachlin CJ	Cromwell, Karakatsanis and Wagner JJ
Quebec (AG) v Canada (AG); 2015 SCC 14	Whether federal legislation abolishing the long-gun registry also containing provision requiring the destruction of long-gun registration data is ultra vires the criminal law power of Parliament under s. 91(27) of the Constitution Act, 1867	Wagner and Gascon JJ	Abella J
