= R v Butler =

1992 Supreme Court of Canada case

- Supreme Court of Canada

Hearing: June 6, 1991 Judgment: February 27, 1992
- Full case name: Donald Victor Butler v. Her Majesty The Queen
- Citations: [1992] 1 S.C.R. 452, 89 D.L.R. (4th) 449, 2 W.W.R. 577, 70 C.C.C. (3d) 129, 11 C.R. (4th) 137, 8 C.R.R. (2d) 1, 78 Man. R. (2d) 1, 78 Man. R. (2e) 1
- Docket No.: 22191
- Prior history: Judgment for the Crown in the Manitoba Court of Appeal.
- Ruling: Appeal allowed.

Holding
- The criminal offence of distribution of obscenity infringes section 2(b) of the Canadian Charter of Rights and Freedoms but can be justified under section 1 of the Charter.

Court membership
- Chief Justice: Antonio Lamer; Puisne Justices: Gérard La Forest, Claire L'Heureux-Dubé, John Sopinka, Charles Gonthier, Peter Cory, Beverley McLachlin, William Stevenson, Frank Iacobucci

Reasons given
- Majority: Sopinka J., joined by Lamer C.J. and La Forest, Cory, McLachlin, Stevenson, and Iacobucci JJ.
- Concurrence: Gonthier J., joined by L'Heureux-Dubé J.

R v Butler, [1992] 1 S.C.R. 452 is a leading Supreme Court of Canada decision on pornography and state censorship. In this case, the Court had to balance the right to freedom of expression under section 2 of the Canadian Charter of Rights and Freedoms with women's rights. The outcome has been described as a victory for anti-pornography feminism and the Women's Legal Education and Action Fund, but a loss for alternative sexualities.

== Background ==
The case involved one Donald Victor Butler, who owned a store called Avenue Video Boutique on Main Street in Winnipeg. The business began in August 1987 and handled pornographic videos, magazines, and sexual objects. On August 21, the police arrived with a search warrant and confiscated the goods, and then charged Butler with possession and distribution of obscenity, crimes under section 163 (then section 159) of the Criminal Code. On October 19 of that year, Butler simply restarted the business at the same location as it had been before, and the police arrested Butler and an employee, Norma McCord, ten days later.

Both were charged for 77 counts under s. 159 (now s. 163); two counts of selling obscene material, 73 counts for possessing obscene material for the purpose of distribution, and one count of possessing obscene material for the purpose of sale, all of which were contrary to either s. 159 (2)(a) or s. 159 (1)(a).

Butler was found guilty of eight charges, while McCord was found guilty of two. They each had to pay $1000 per offence. The trial had been held on June 22, 1988.

However, the Women's Legal Education and Action Fund, along with Group Against Pornography, and various other anti-pornography groups were unhappy with the verdict and appealed to the Crown. Butler had to return to court on July 4, 1991 where he was found guilty. In turn, Butler appealed and he went to the Supreme Court of Canada on February 27, 1992, where he was found guilty and pornography legislation was modified in Canada.

Afterward, Butler moved away to Alberta where he was diagnosed with a severe heart condition. After legislation was passed, Butler had to return to trial, but was too ill to return to Winnipeg for the trial, so it was held in Alberta in 1993.

== Decision ==
=== Freedom of expression ===
The Court found laws against obscenity would breach freedom of expression. The Manitoba Court of Appeal had found that it would not, following the Supreme Court case Irwin Toy Ltd. v. Quebec (Attorney General) (1989) in saying the obscenity did not attempt to convey anything meaningful and might just be physical. However, the Supreme Court found fault with this opinion, saying that while the obscenity related to physical matters, they still made expression. In this case the expression was meant to be sexually exciting. The Court also noted that degrading sex may not be protected by the Charter, but a depiction of it would be expression.

The Supreme Court pointed to R. v. Keegstra (1990) to say the obscenity laws violated freedom of expression. Keegstra demonstrated freedom of expression should be interpreted expansively, and in the Prostitution Reference it was noted that whatever the message within the expression, the expression itself is protected by section 2.

The Court also considered a view suggested by the Attorney General of British Columbia, suggesting that films could not be as expressive as writing. The Supreme Court rejected the idea, noting that in making a film many creative choices in editing will have to be made.

=== Reasonable limits ===
The Court then turned to the question of whether the infringement of section 2 could be justified under section 1 of the Charter. This raised the possibility that the law was so vague that it might fail the section 1 requirement that a limit be "prescribed by law." The Court, citing the Beetz opinion in R. v. Morgentaler (1988), said that a law that can be interpreted differently is not necessarily too vague. The Court then decided that given the past case law, the terms "indecent" and "immoral" seemed sufficiently understandable.

In asking whether the law could be demonstrably justified, the objective was considered, in accordance with R. v. Oakes (1986). Objectives suggested by the Crown included prevention of harm that may arise from the attitudes promoted by the obscenity. The protection of decency was also a proposed objective. Those challenging the law stated its only objectives were moral. Historically, the objective of the law was meant to combat immorality and its impact on society. The Charter of Rights suggested this objective would no longer be sufficient, as it contradicted the individual's rights. While many criminal laws were enacted against perceived immoral things, the Supreme Court turned away from this objective and decided the true objective of the law was to minimize dangers to society. The Court noted obscenity could encourage degrading views of women and could promote violence. This contradicted the view of Canada as a society in which people are equal. Typically, the original purpose of the law is what is considered under section 1. In this case, the Supreme Court justified itself by saying the original purpose of avoiding immorality, and the recognized purpose in this case, of preventing harm, were linked. The immorality could lead to harm. The Court also noted that Canada had international agreements that targeted obscenity, namely the Agreement for the Suppression of the Circulation of Obscene Publications and the Convention for the Suppression of the Circulation of and Traffic in Obscene Publications.

With a sufficient objective identified, it now had to be asked whether the law was rational and proportionate to the objective. The Court noted, then, that the law should not affect acceptable pornography, namely the type that might celebrate female sexuality and pleasure. Material that degrade women were similar to hate speech. It was rational to outlaw obscenity in order to protect society. Although it was disputed whether obscenity truly promotes harm, some reports did support this conclusion. The courts could then defer to the Parliament of Canada on this matter.

The Court found the law to be proportional. The legislation did not outlaw non-degrading erotica. Moreover, a vague definition of obscenity in the law was acceptable since politicians had difficulty in drawing up comprehensive definitions. Making the obscenity public was criminalized while private materials may not be.

== Framework for analysis ==
To simplify the analysis Justice John Sopinka divided potentially obscene materials into three categories:

1. Explicit sex with violence;
2. Explicit sex without violence, but which subjects participants to treatment that is degrading or dehumanizing; and
3. Explicit sex without violence that is neither degrading nor dehumanizing.

Violence in this context was considered to include "both actual physical violence and threats of physical violence."

Justice John Sopinka then went on to state that materials in the first category "will almost always constitute the undue exploitation of sex." Material in the second category "may be undue if the risk of harm is substantial." And, finally, material in the third category "is generally tolerated in our society and will not qualify as the undue exploitation of sex unless it employs children in its production." Any material that was considered to be the "undue" exploitation of sex would fall within the definition of "obscene" in the Criminal Code.

The court also provided for an exception for materials of artistic merit.

This framework for analysis was re-affirmed by the Supreme Court of Canada in Little Sisters Book and Art Emporium v. Canada (Minister of Justice).

== Aftermath ==
The decision has affected other cases involving pornography and other alleged forms of indecency. The case Little Sisters Book and Art Emporium v. Canada (Minister of Justice) (2000) applied the Butler method of analysis of pornography to homosexual pornography. Critics of Butler argued that the test failed to recognize pornography that promotes equality of homosexuals. However, the Supreme Court replied that "This line of criticism underestimates Butler." Butler is partially meant to avoid a situation in which a biased idea of obscenity is imposed on others. The Supreme Court also found that "It may serve repeating that the national community standard [recognized in Butler] relates to harm not taste."

In R. v. Labaye (2005), the Supreme Court considered clubs in which group sex occurred. The majority cited Butler to say that indecency can be defined as only that which causes harm. Thus, the majority disregarded the community standards test, despite the dissent's objections that this was not an inevitable consequence of Butler.

== See also ==
- List of Supreme Court of Canada cases (Lamer Court)
- R. v. Glad Day Bookshops Inc.
- American Booksellers v. Hudnut, 771 F.2d 323 (7th Cir. 1985), aff'd mem., 475 U.S. 1001 (1986)
