= R v Wholesale Travel Group Inc =

- Supreme Court of Canada

Hearing: February 18, 1991 Judgment: October 24, 1991
- Full case name: The Wholesale Travel Group Inc v Her Majesty The Queen
- Citations: [1991] 3 S.C.R. 154, 4 O.R. (3d) 799, 84 D.L.R. (4th) 161, 67 C.C.C. (3d) 193, 38 C.P.R. (3d) 451, 7 C.R.R. (2d) 36, 8 C.R. (4th) 145, 49 O.A.C. 161
- Docket No.: 21779
- Prior history: Appeal from Ont. Court of Appeal
- Ruling: Wholesale appeal dismissed

Court membership
- Chief Justice: Antonio Lamer; Puisne Justices: Bertha Wilson, Gérard La Forest, Claire L'Heureux-Dubé, John Sopinka, Charles Gonthier, Peter Cory, Beverley McLachlin, William Stevenson

Reasons given
- Majority: Cory J.
- Concurrence: Iacobucci J.
- Concurrence: Lamer C.J.
- Concurrence: La Forest J.

R v Wholesale Travel Group Inc [1991] 3 S.C.R. 154, is a leading Supreme Court of Canada case on the distinction between "true crime" and regulatory offences.

== Background ==
Wholesale Travel sold vacation packages which it advertised as being at "wholesale prices" when, in fact, they were not wholesale prices at all. The company was charged with five counts of false or misleading advertising contrary to s. 36(1)(a) [now s. 60(2)] of the Competition Act. The charge was a hybrid offence that could be either an indictment consisting of a fine at the discretion of the court and to imprisonment for five years or to both, or a summary conviction consisting of a fine of $25,000 and a prison term for one year or both.

At trial, the judge held that ss. 36 and 37.3, which allowed for a due diligence defence, were in violation of ss. 7 and 11(d) of the Canadian Charter of Rights and Freedoms. The Crown's appeal for a dismissal was allowed and the case was resubmitted for trial. At appeal, the Court of Appeal for Ontario upheld the order for a trial. The accused applied to the Supreme Court of Canada and was rejected the first time but was accepted on a second appeal.

The issue before the Court was whether s. 37.3(2) of the Competition Act violated s. 7 of the Charter (which safeguards the "security of the person").

== Ruling ==
The Court unanimously held that offences for which the mens rea is not necessary (as in cases of reglementary offences (See R v Sault Ste-Marie (City of)) do not violate s. 7 of the Charter when a due diligence defence demonstrated by preponderance of evidence (s. 37.3(2)(a) and (b)) is available, but that the "timely retraction" provisions of s. 37.3(2)(c) and (d) did infringe s. 7 and could not be saved under s.1.

The Court however was divided on whether a reversal of onus onto the accused in s. 37.3(2) was constitutional. The majority (Lamer with LaForest, Sopinka, Gonthier, McLachlin, Stevenson, and Iacobucci) held that the reverse onus infringed s.11(d) of the Charter. However, only four of the seven held that it could not be saved under s. 1. Since the remaining 2 judges (L'Heureux-Dube and Cory) found the reversal of onus did not violate s. 11(d), the majority view was held by those that argued a reversal of onus was constitutionally justifiable by a 5 to 4 margin.

== Comment ==
Note that the counsel for Wholesale Travel Group Inc. was led by Ian Binnie who would be promoted to the Supreme Court a few years later.
