= Shona Holmes health care incident =

Shona Holmes, or Shona Robertson-Holmes, (born 1964 (age 61–62)) is a Canadian woman who underwent treatment for a Rathke's cleft cyst in the United States, and claimed the condition threatened her life. Her cyst was removed August 1, 2005. Holmes sought treatment in the US claiming that she was unable to get timely treatment in Canada. Holmes sued the Ontario provincial government seeking payment for her medical and travel expenses. She has given testimony before members of the US Congress during a Republican-sponsored hearing about healthcare legislation, and has appeared in ads seeking to repeal the Patient Protection and Affordable Care Act and defeat President Obama in the 2012 presidential election.

The facts surrounding her medical condition are controversial and cannot be independently verified because she has refused to release her medical records, citing her lawsuit. However, the Mayo Clinic, where the surgery was performed, has stated that she could have eventually lost her sight without surgery.

She is a resident of Waterdown, Ontario, a small community in the rural part of Hamilton. In 2007, she described herself as a family mediator. In 2008, she described herself as a patient advocate.

== September 2007 lawsuit ==
Holmes initiated a lawsuit against the Ontario government on September 5, 2007. The Canadian Constitution Foundation sponsored the lawsuit, which also included Lindsay McCreith, a Newmarket, Ontario resident, who traveled to the United States for timely treatment of a brain tumor. Her case cited Chaoulli v Quebec, a Supreme Court of Canada ruling on direct billing filed by Quebec physician Jacques Chaoulli. As of September 2009, the lawsuit was still unresolved.

== YouTube video ==
Holmes published a YouTube video of her appearance on Global TV in 2007. Holmes and her husband have two YouTube channels (homiemagnum and shonaholmes3) where copies were placed for the Canadian Constitution Foundation. This group is backing the joint statement of claim, along with Lindsay McCreith of Newmarket, against the province of Ontario. In 2009, the Holmes story was publicized in the United States debates on American health care reform. Holmes continued to participate in the US health care debate, publishing op-eds in American papers.

== US advertising controversy ==
=== 2009 US television advertisement ===
In 2009 her story was presented in a US television advertisement as a cautionary tale of what Americans could expect if they were to adopt a publicly funded health care system like the Canadian health care system. The advertisement was paid for by "Patients United Now," a project of Americans for Prosperity Foundation, an American conservative political advocacy group. The ad featuring Holmes was broadcast at a cost of $1.8 million in eight US states.

"We went 100 per cent into socialized medicine and we lost all our options," Holmes said recently of the Canadian system.

After being told she would have to wait six months for treatment in Canada, she mortgaged her home to pay $100,000 for treatment at the Mayo Clinic. She is quoted as saying the Canadian health care system failed her. In an ad broadcast on American television she said, "If I'd relied on my government, I'd be dead."

While Holmes referred to her condition as a "brain tumor," Ian Welsh, writing in the Huffington Post, reports that while the Mayo Clinic characterizes Holmes's treatment as a success, they say she had "a Rathke's Cleft Cyst on her pituitary gland". The Canadian Broadcasting Corporation (CBC) interviewed neurosurgeons in Montreal and Toronto who described her claims as exaggerated; they stated that her condition was a benign cyst, not a medical emergency. The Mayo Clinic has been cited as saying that the condition is "not known to be fatal" and makes no claim that her life was in danger, but it stated that she could have eventually lost her sight without surgery.

As a result of publicity generated by the television ad, Holmes has been interviewed many times on American television, including five interviews on the Fox Network, and one interview on CNN.

=== Canadian reaction ===
The use of her claims in the US stirred great controversy in Canada, where the Canadian health care system is popular across the political spectrum. The use of her claims triggered comments from Ujjal Dosanjh, the Liberal Party of Canada's health critic, who called her case "an exception to the rule." Jim Meek wrote in the Halifax Chronicle Herald, commenting on the strength of Canadian reaction to the Holmes claims:

"Holmes attacked our medical system from inside the U.S., which is seen in this country as an act of High Treason."

The late Jack Layton, the leader of the New Democratic Party at the time, travelled to the United States, so he could appear on American television to rebut Holmes's claims.

=== Local reaction ===
On July 23, 2009, a few days following the publication of the ad, the Hamilton Spectator reported on its front page the troubles faced by another resident of Waterdown, whose home phone was also listed under the name "S. Holmes".

According to the Spectator, Palmira Holmes was inundated by callers' wanting to chastise Shona Holmes, describing the volume of calls as "like being bombarded". The Spectator commented that the volume of angry calls Palmira was receiving was consistent with the large volume of comments left on Canadian media websites.

"Canadian media websites that have carried items on the ad have registered more than 1,000 critical online comments since Monday. A key area of discussion for critics is whether the facts about Holmes' case are accurately portrayed."

The Toronto Star published a letter to the editor from another Waterdown resident, who had a true brain tumor. She described the care she received in the Canadian health care system as being of "exceptional quality". Her letter concluded with the comment: "I know our health care system works and if Holmes didn't have a problem with her physician what exactly are her motives for taking part in this media spectacle?"

=== Democrats Abroad reaction ===
The Hamilton Spectator interviewed Kenneth Sherman, a leader of a group of American expatriates who live in Canada. According to Sherman, Americans who lived in Canada, and received care under the Canadian health care system, recognized that if her account was accurate, her case was an atypical one. He challenged the accuracy of her account. He said the Americans who were members of his group, Democrats Abroad, received care under the Canadian health care system and were considering sponsoring a counterad to rebut Holmes' claims.

=== 2012 political ad ===
Holmes was featured again in an advertisement targeting the 2012 United States presidential election. In the ad, placed by the political action committee "Americans For Prosperity", Holmes refers to the condition treated as a "rare brain condition."
