= Women's Legal Education and Action Fund =

- Abbreviation: LEAF
- Formation: 1985
- Founder: Susan Tanner
- Type: Women's rights
- Legal status: active
- Purpose: advocate and public voice, educator and network
- Headquarters: Toronto, Ontario, Canada
- Region served: Canada
- Official language: English, French
- Website: leaf.ca

Women's Legal Education and Action Fund, referred to by the acronym LEAF, is a women's rights organization based in Toronto, Ontario, Canada.

== History ==
Canadian Lawyer magazine describes LEAF as a "non-profit organization that works to advance gender equality and human rights through litigation, law reform, and education". The founding chair of LEAF was Susan Tanner, and author Judy Rebick wrote in her book Ten Thousand Roses: The Making of a Feminist Revolution that other founders had included both lawyers and non-lawyers, such as Nancy Ruth, Pat Hacker, Linda Ryan Nye, Kay Macpherson, Kay Sigurjonsson, and even former Chatelaine magazine editor Doris Anderson.

LEAF has intervened in supreme court cases relating to freedom of expression and obscenity laws, especially in cases where obscenity laws were used to censor LGBTQ material. LEAF was an intervener in R v. Butler and Little Sisters Book and Art Emporium v. Canada. These positions on obscenity law were controversial. Speaking about the controversy, LEAF National Legal Committee member Karen Busby said, “One thing that obscenity law provides for is an imaginary national community standard. We’ll argue that reliance on a community standards test is incompatible with recent case law in equality because what it will approve of is what the majority approves of.”

== Books written about the organization ==
In 1991 Sherene Razack wrote the book Canadian Feminism and the Law: The Women's Legal Education and Action Fund and the Pursuit of Equality just a half decade after the creation of LEAF. A book by Peter Manfredi was later written on the various results of the advocacy pursued by LEAF entitled Feminist Activism in the Supreme Court: Legal Mobilization and the Women's Legal Education and Action Fund.

== Interventions ==
- R. v. Ryan
- Little Sisters Book and Art Emporium v. Canada (Minister of Justice), [2000] 2 S.C.R. 1120
- British Columbia (PSERC) v. BCGSEU [1999] 3 S.C.R. 3
- M. v. H., [1999] 2 S.C.R. 3
- Eldridge v. British Columbia (Attorney General), [1997] 3 S.C.R. 624
- Weatherall v. Canada (Attorney General), [1993] 2 S.C.R. 872
- R. v. Butler, [1992] 1 S.C.R. 452
- Canadian Council of Churches v. Canada (Minister of Employment and Immigration), [1992] 1 S.C.R. 236
- Norberg v. Wynrib, [1992] 2 S.C.R. 224
- R. v. Sullivan, [1991] 1 S.C.R. 489
- Brooks v. Canada Safeway Ltd., [1989] 1 S.C.R. 1219
- Andrews v. Law Society of British Columbia, [1989] 1 S.C.R. 143
- R. v. J.A., 2011 SCC 28
