= Deepan Budlakoti =

Canadian non-citizen

Deepan Budlakoti (born 17 October 1989) is an Ottawa-born man best known for Canada's refusal to acknowledge him as a citizen. His case, supported by numerous human rights organizations and a modest mobilization of public support, was heard by several Canadian courts, and has captured domestic and international attention. Since Budlakoti does not hold any citizenship, his case raises questions of citizenship, statelessness and deportation.

== Background ==
Budlakoti was born on 17 October 1989 in Ottawa, Ontario, to Indian nationals who had been employed at the Indian High Commission. Section 3(2) of the Citizenship Act states that children of diplomats and their staff, when born in Canada, are not entitled to Canadian citizenship. The Government of Canada alleged that, at the time of Budlakoti's birth, his parents were working as cleaning staff at the High Commission; Budlakoti contended that his parents had left that job several months before. After his birth, Budlakoti was issued with an Ontario birth certificate and subsequently two Canadian passports. In 1992, Budlakoti's parents applied for permanent residency, listing Budlakoti as a dependent. The application was accepted.

In late 2010, Budlakoti was convicted for weapons trafficking, firearm possession and cocaine trafficking, and sentenced to three years in prison. The Justice for Deepan Support Committee, which worked with Budlakoti to raise awareness about the case, raised money for escalating legal fees, and put political pressure on elected officials to reverse the decision, contends that Budlakoti was entrapped by an undercover police officer, and that Budlakoti pleaded guilty due to the high legal fees.

While Budlakoti was in prison, Citizenship and Immigration Canada determined that he was not and had never been a Canadian citizen, and thus was inadmissible to Canada on the basis of section 36(1) of the Immigration and Refugee Protection Act, and issued a removal order accordingly. Budlakoti was released in 2012 while awaiting judicial review of the Immigration and Refugee Board of Canada's decision. As a result, he lost all other corresponding Canadian identification, leaving him unable to work, access health care, exercise the full extent of his mobility rights, or live alone.

== At trial ==
In June 2014, Budlakoti's case was heard before the Federal Court. He argued that his section 7 Charter rights to life, liberty and security of the person were violated. In fall 2014, the Federal Court dismissed his application for judicial review, holding that "[t]he fact that passports were issued to the Applicant is not, in this case, determinative of citizenship". The court found that issuing a declaration of citizenship would fall outside the court's authority. The court dismissed Budlakoti's section 7 Charter argument, finding that "denial of citizenship is not synonymous with deportation", and that "the denial of state funded health care does not violate s 7", per Chaoulli v Quebec (AG).

Budlakoti appealed to the Federal Court of Appeal, where the appeal was dismissed. The court held that he was not stateless, per the Convention on the Reduction of Statelessness, since he could still "take steps to apply for citizenship in India and in Canada" through the general citizenship application process, or by invoking the "special and unusual hardship" rule in the Citizenship Act. The court found that he had not yet availed himself of either of these procedures in Canada or in India. Budlakoti argued that the then-Minister of Citizenship, Chris Alexander, was biased, as a spokesperson for Alexander had previously denounced Budlakoti as a "criminal". The court rejected this argument, finding that if Budlakoti applied under the "special and unusual hardship" rule, the hardship would be "determinative... [and] neither the Minister nor his officials have commented on that issue".

A request for leave for appeal to the Supreme Court was denied in January 2016.

== Issues ==
This case is unique and has attracted international attention. Amnesty International has condemned the Canadian government's actions, arguing that, as a signatory to the United Nations Convention on the Reduction of Statelessness, Canada should "act to reduce statelessness and uphold the right to a nationality".

== Criminal activity ==
On 8 November 2017, charges were announced against Deepan Budlakoti and five others, for gun trafficking, possessing the proceeds of crime, breaching a gun ban and drug trafficking. The investigation was conducted by the Ontario Provincial Police's organized crime enforcement bureau and Ottawa and Gatineau police.
