= Deepan =

Deepan may refer to:

- Deepan Chakravarthy, Indian singer
- Deepan Budlakoti (born 1989), Involved in citizenship dispute
- Deepan Sivaraman, Indian theatre director
- Chakkravarthy Deepan (born 1987), Chess grandmaster
- Deepan (1972–2017), film director
