= Karen Busby =

Canadian jurist and feminist legal scholar (1958–2026)

- Born: September 17, 1958; Edmonton, Alberta, Canada
- Died: July 23, 2026 (aged 67); Winnipeg, Manitoba, Canada
- Occupations: Lawyer, academic
- Known for: Research into queer issues, reproductive rights, constitutional law, and civil procedure

Karen Busby (17 September 1958 – 23 July 2026) was a Canadian lawyer, feminist and academic who was a professor in the Faculty of Law at the University of Manitoba. She is most known for her research into queer issues, reproductive rights, constitutional law, and civil procedure.

== Education and career ==
Busby studied law at the University of Manitoba and received her juris doctor in 1981. In 1983, she studied French language studies at the Sorbonne and then in 1988 received her Masters of Law from Columbia University. She worked as a research assistant and first ever clerk at the Federal Court of Canada from 1984 to 1987 and then started as an assistant professor at the University of Manitoba in 1988.

In April 2002, she founded the Group Organizing for Same-Sex Issues and Principles (GOSSIP) to advocate for the Government of Manitoba to amend legislation that discriminated against same sex couples. These efforts resulted in the Bill 34 - The Charter Compliance Act, which amended 56 piece of legislation to remove distinctions between opposite and sex relationships, Bill 41 - An Act To Comply With The Supreme Court of Canada Decision In M. v. H, which extended pension and benefits to same sex partners, and Bill 53 - The Common Law Partners’ Property and Related Amendments Act, which extended marital property law to common law unions.

Her work was quoted in major legal decisions and she intervened in several cases. Her research in sexual violence was quoted in the Supreme Court of Canada's decision in R. v. Mills. She went on to represent the Women's Legal Education and Action Fund in Little Sisters Book and Art Emporium v. Canada, which challenged the validity of the Customs Act being used to ban the import of gay and lesbian literature on the grounds of obscenity. She has also spoken in opposition to judges who indicated that women are in a state of sexual readiness based on their clothing.

Busby was the founding director of the University of Manitoba's Centre for Human Rights Research, which was founded in 2012. She also served on the Board of Directors for the Winnipeg Art Gallery.

== Selected publications ==
Busby was the founding author of the annotated version of the Manitoba Queen's Bench rules, which she edited starting in 1992 until 2002. This publication is still maintained, now as the annotated version of the Manitoba King's Bench rules.

In 2020, Busby along with Joanna Birenbaum published Achieving Fairness: A Guide To Campus Sexual Violence Complaints. The book discusses how to balance privacy concerns with transparency, when to involve the criminal process, and the design of "fair, efficient, and bias-free" campus sexual violence policies.

In 2025, Busby contributed the opening chapter to Joanna Radboard's LGBTQ2+ Law: Practice Issues and Analysis. Her chapter was called The Gay Agenda: A Short History of Queer Rights in Canada (1969–2018).

Other works include:

- Busby, Karen; Muller, Adam; Woolford, Andrew, eds. (2015). The idea of a human rights museum. Winnipeg, Manitoba: University of Manitoba Press. ISBN 978-0-88755-782-8.
- Busby, Karen (2012). "Every Breath You Take: Erotic Asphyxiation, Vengeful Wives, and Other Enduring Myths in Spousal Sexual Assault Protections". Canadian Journal of Women and Law. 24 (2): 328–358. doi:10.2139/ssrn.2084792.
- Busby, Karen; Vun, Delaney (2010). "Revisiting the Handmaid's Tale: Feminist Theory Meets Empirical Research on Surrogate Mothers" (PDF). Can J Family Law. 26 (1): 13.

== Personal life and death ==
Busby was born in Edmonton, Alberta. She lived most of her life in Winnipeg with her wife, Jan Lederman. She lived with Parkinson's disease for 15 years. Busby died on 23 July 2026, at the age of 67.

== Awards ==
- 2007 - YWCA Women of Distinction Award in the category of business and professions.
- 2004 - Hero award from Canadian Bar Association's Sexual Orientation and Gender Identity Conference.
- 2015 - Dr. and Mrs. H.H. Saunderson Award for Excellence in Teaching.
- 2017 - Senate 150 medal.
- 2018 - Barney Sneiderman Award for Teaching Excellence, University of Manitoba Faculty of Law.
- 2025 - Richard J. Scott Award, awarded annually by Law Society of Manitoba.
