= Canadian Association of Elizabeth Fry Societies =

The Canadian Association of Elizabeth Fry Societies (CAEFS) is an association of groups operating under the Elizabeth Fry Society banner, similar in many respects to the John Howard Society. The Elizabeth Fry Society groups work on issues affecting women, girls and gender diverse people in the justice system. The societies take their name from prison reformer Elizabeth Fry.

The organization was started in 1969, with formal incorporation as a non-profit organization occurring in 1978. They help women, girls and gender diverse people to re-integrate into society when they have been in prison or otherwise affected by the criminal justice system. They work independently from the government.

The first Elizabeth Fry Society of Canada was established in Vancouver in 1939. Canada's first female Member of Parliament, Agnes Macphail, later led the push to open its Toronto branch in 1952. The nationwide The Canadian Association of Elizabeth Fry Societies company formation was officiated 1969. It was then incorporated as a nonprofit organization in 1978.

From a national scope, some of the leading names credited as executive figures on the National Office Team include, Emilie Coyle, Nyki Kish, Jacquline Omstead. Operating under the national umbrella, Canadian Association of Elizabeth Fry Societies are branched off into five segments: Atlantic, Quebec, Ontario, Prairies and Pacific.

== Regional Sections ==
=== Atlantic ===
- Elizabeth Fry New Brunswick
- Elizabeth Fry Society of Cape Breton
- Elizabeth Fry Society of Mainland Nova Scotia

=== Quebec ===
- Société Elizabeth Fry Quebec

=== Ontario ===
- Elizabeth Fry Society of Ottawa
- Elizabeth Fry Society of Peterborough
- Elizabeth Fry Toronto
- Elizabeth Fry Simcoe Muskoka
- Elizabeth Fry Hope and Help
- Elizabeth Fry Society of North Eastern Ontario
- Elizabeth Fry Society of North Western Ontario
- Elizabeth Fry Kingston

=== Prairies ===
- Elizabeth Fry Manitoba
- Elizabeth Fry Society of Saskatchewan
- Elizabeth Fry Society of Calgary
- Elizabeth Fry Society of Northern Alberta

=== Pacific ===
- Kamloops & District Elizabeth Fry Society
- Prince George and District Elizabeth Fry Society
- Central Okanagan Elizabeth Fry Society
- Elizabeth Fry Society of Greater Vancouver
- The South Cariboo Elizabeth Fry Society
- Archway Society

The Elizabeth Fry Society has also assisted women and gender diverse people who face criminal proceedings. They have had intervenor status in a number of Supreme Court of Canada cases including R v Ryan, in which Nicole Patricia Ryan was arrested by the Royal Canadian Mounted Police after attempting to hire an undercover officer as a hitman to kill her husband. The RCMP were criticized by the Supreme Court for failing to protect Ryan from an abusive husband, however both the husband and the RCMP denied the reported abuse. The husband was not called to testify during the trial.

== See also ==
- Canadian Association of Elizabeth Fry Societies
- John Howard Society
