= John Howard Society =

Canadian non-profit organization

- Named after: John Howard
- Formation: 1867; 159 years ago
- Founded at: Toronto, Ontario
- Type: Nonprofit
- Headquarters: Kingston, Ontario
- Location: Canada
- Coordinates: 44.2515°N 76.5715°W
- Website: www.johnhoward.ca

The John Howard Society of Canada is a Canadian non-profit organization that seeks to develop understanding and effective responses to the problem of crime and prison reform. It is named after John Howard, a philanthropist and early English prison reformer. The society works with adults, children, and youths to help rebuild their lives.

== History ==
The origins of the John Howard Society date back to 1867, with a church group focused on providing spiritual care to prisoners in a Toronto prison. This group became recognized in 1874 as the Prisoners Aid Association of Toronto. It was soon discovered more was needed the prisoners than the spiritual care they had been providing. Due to decreasing interest, the group became inactive in 1915.

In 1929, Toronto police chief Dennis Draper reactivated the group as the Citizens Service Association after realizing that the conditions prisoners faced upon release were undermining the work of the police. This association was volunteer operated and assisted released prisoners in finding housing, clothing and employment.

The first organization with the John Howard Society name was founded in British Columbia in 1931 by Reverend J. Dinnage Hobden. The society was named after John Howard, an English prison reformer who lived from 1726 to 1790.

In 1946, the Citizens Service Association was renamed the John Howard Society of Ontario. Between 1947 and 1960, most other provinces created their own version of the John Howard Society, and in February 1962, The John Howard Society of Canada was formed when all provinces, excluding Quebec, approved a constitution. Quebec joined in 1980, followed by the Northwest Territories in 1994.

== Mission and Values ==
The John Howard Society of Canada (JHS) fills an important role in public education, community service, and advocating for reform in the criminal justice system. With branches and offices in over 60 communities across Canada, including provincial offices in all 10 provinces and the Northwest Territories, and a national office in Kingston, JHS is committed to promoting effective, just, and humane responses to crime and its causes.

=== Mission Statement ===
The mission of the John Howard Society of Canada is to promote effective, just, and humane responses to the causes and consequences of crime.

=== Core Values ===
JHS's core values guide its work and advocacy efforts across the country:

1. Effectiveness: Implementing evidence-based programs and services to reduce recidivism and support successful reintegration.
2. Justice: Advocating for a fair and equitable criminal justice system that protects individual rights.
3. Humanity: Promoting humane treatment within the criminal justice system and prioritizing rehabilitation over punishment.
4. Accountability: Maintaining transparency and ethical practices in all aspects of work.
5. Compassion: Approaching work with empathy and understanding the complex factors contributing to criminal behavior.
6. Continual Learning: Staying informed about the latest research and best practices in criminal justice reform.

=== Perspectives on Corrections: Towards a Philosophy of Corrections ===
Background: Since its inception, the John Howard Society has stood for a correctional system that protects community members from criminal activity while treating offenders in a manner that allows them to reintegrate into society successfully.

Philosophy: The philosophy of corrections endorsed by JHS emphasizes the following:

1. Purpose of Criminal Law: Criminal law is essential for registering social disapproval of wrongful acts, publicly denouncing them, and reaffirming violated values. However, its impact is primarily negative, setting boundaries rather than encouraging morally commendable actions.
2. Punishment and Rehabilitation: Punishment should consist of deprivation of freedom rather than physical or psychological harm. The goal is to protect society and mark society's commitment to the law and its values.
3. Programs and Services: Inmates should have access to services and programs that aid in their rehabilitation, similar to those available to the general public, ensuring they can use their time constructively.
4. Prison Administration: Prisons should have rules to ensure sentences are carried out, protect inmates and staff, and encourage inmates to use their time constructively.

Core Statements, Values, and Principles:

1. Respect for Law and Rights: Promoting activities that contribute to a healthy community life and ensuring offenders retain their rights except those explicitly removed by their sentence.
2. Human Dignity: Treating all individuals with dignity, equity, fairness, and compassion, and ensuring universal accessibility of public services to offenders.
3. Responsibility and Accountability: Providing services that give offenders the opportunity for personal development and integration into the community.
4. Public Involvement: Engaging in research and advocacy to inform and involve the public in the criminal justice process.
5. Restorative Justice: Promoting measures that resolve conflicts, repair harm, and restore peaceful relations in society.
6. Autonomous Non-Governmental Role: Ensuring independent, voluntary organizations play a vital role in the criminal justice process, maintaining autonomy and freedom in their operations

By adhering to these principles, the John Howard Society of Canada aims to build a just and humane society where every individual has the opportunity to build a better future.

== Organization ==
John Howard society offices and branches can be found in sixty communities across Canada, in all of the provinces and the Northwest Territories. The John Howard Society has sixty-five offices across Canada which specialize in the reintegration of individuals exiting the prison system back into society. They also work to keep individuals from making decisions that will increase their likelihood of contact with the law. In addition to this, their head office is located in Kingston, Ontario, which is within driving distance of 10 penitentiaries.

The people who comprise the modern John Howard Society have much the same focus as the original groups with a few additions. For example, advocating for change in the criminal justice process and public education around the issues of prison conditions, criminal law and their application are all newer considerations as society and the criminal justice system change.

In addition to working with people in penitentiaries, Societies today also work with adults and youth in correctional facilities that are either federally and provincially operated. These services offer programming for offenders in custody and in the community and also assist those who have been labeled as "at risk" to continue to live or reintegrate into living "within the law".

== See also ==
- Canadian Association of Elizabeth Fry Societies
