= R v Hebert =

1990 Case of the Supreme Court of Canada

- Supreme Court of Canada

Hearing: November 8, 1989 Judgment: June 21, 1990
- Full case name: Neil Gerald Hebert v Her Majesty The Queen
- Citations: [1990] 2 S.C.R. 151

Court membership
- Chief Justice: Brian Dickson; Puisne Justices: Antonio Lamer, Bertha Wilson, Gérard La Forest, Claire L'Heureux-Dubé, John Sopinka, Charles Gonthier, Peter Cory, Beverley McLachlin

Reasons given
- Majority: McLachlin J., joined by Dickson C.J. and Lamer, La Forest, L'Heureux-Dubé, Gonthier and Cory JJ.
- Concurrence: Sopinka J.
- Concurrence: Wilson J.

R v Hebert [1990] 2 S.C.R. 151 is the leading Supreme Court of Canada decision on an accused's right to silence under section seven of the Canadian Charter of Rights and Freedoms.

== Background ==
In 1987, Neil Hebert was arrested for armed robbery. He was informed of his rights and taken to an RCMP detachment. Upon consulting a lawyer, he said he was not going to make any statements. Hebert was put in a cell with an undercover agent posing as another arrested suspect. The undercover agent chatted with Hebert and managed to elicit several incriminating statements from him.

At trial, a voir dire was held to determine the admissibility of the conversation. The judge found that Hebert's right to counsel under section 10(b) of the Charter, and his right to remain silent under section 7 were violated. On appeal the court found that Hebert's rights were not violated and a new trial was ordered.

== Opinion of the Court ==
Beverley McLachlin, writing for the majority, held that the evidence was inadmissible and upheld the trial judge's ruling.

McLachlin found that the right to silence was a principle of fundamental justice and as such was protected under section 7. Once in police custody, an accused's right cannot be undermined through acts of police trickery. However, if the accused were to divulge information to an informer or undercover agent of their own free will then the statements could be used against them.
