= Akulue v R =

Supreme Court of New Zealand case on the defence of compulsion

- Court: Supreme Court of New Zealand
- Full case name: Ifeanyi Jude Akulue v The Queen
- Decided: 19 September 2013
- Citation: [2013] NZSC 88, [2014] 1 NZLR 17
- Transcript: Full judgment

Case history
- Prior action: Court of Appeal [2013] NZCA 84; District Court CRI-2011-004-1967 (12 October 2012)

Court membership
- Judges sitting: Elias CJ, McGrath, William Young, Glazebrook and Gault JJ

Keywords
- defence of compulsion, duress by threats, s 24 Crimes Act 1961, common law necessity

Akulue v R [2013] NZSC 88 is a decision of the Supreme Court of New Zealand concerning the statutory defence of compulsion under section 24 of the Crimes Act 1961. The case arose from the importation of methamphetamine through Auckland Airport by Ifeanyi Jude Akulue, a Nigerian man living in New Zealand, who claimed he had acted under threats made by a cousin in Nigeria against members of his family there. The Supreme Court unanimously dismissed his appeal, holding that the strict requirements of section 24 were not met on the facts and that no parallel common law defence of necessity was available where the threat came from another person.

The case is regarded as the leading authority in New Zealand on the defence of compulsion. It confirmed that section 24 must be applied strictly according to its terms, requiring that the threat be of immediate death or grievous bodily harm made by a person present at the time of the offence. The Court also held that section 20 of the Crimes Act 1961 does not preserve a common law necessity defence for human threats, as Parliament had set out the complete statutory scheme in section 24. The Court rejected the approach taken by the Supreme Court of Canada in R v Ruzic, which had invalidated similar strict requirements on the basis of moral involuntariness, noting that New Zealand courts cannot strike down legislation and that the New Zealand Bill of Rights Act 1990 does not compel the same outcome.

Legal commentators have criticised the decision for leaving the compulsion defence narrow and ineffective in cases involving distant or non-immediate threats, and have called for Parliament to reform section 24, including by removing the presence requirement or adopting a moral involuntariness test. As of 2026, no legislative change has been made.

== Background ==
Ifeanyi Jude Akulue, a Nigerian man living in New Zealand, was charged with importing methamphetamine and conspiring to supply it. Police intercepted the drugs at Auckland Airport. Akulue admitted he had contacted the courier but said he had acted only because his cousin in Nigeria, known as Zuby, had threatened to kidnap and kill members of his family there unless he helped with the importation. He gave evidence of a recent kidnapping of his uncle in Nigeria for which a ransom had been paid, and said he did not contact New Zealand police because he believed the police in Nigeria were corrupt.

In the District Court, Akulue asked to lead this evidence in support of the statutory defence of compulsion under s 24 of the Crimes Act or, alternatively, the common law defence of necessity. Section 24 protects a person from criminal responsibility only if the offence is committed under threats of immediate death or grievous bodily harm made by a person present at the time of the offence. The District Court judge ruled the statutory defence was not available (the threatener was in Nigeria and the threat was not immediate), but allowed the evidence for the common law defence of necessity.

The Solicitor-General appealed. The Court of Appeal held that the common law defence of necessity does not apply where the threat comes from another person. It overturned the District Court ruling.

Akulue then appealed to the Supreme Court. He argued that the words “immediate” and “present” in s 24 should be read more broadly, or that a common law defence of necessity should still be available under s 20 of the Crimes Act.

== Judgment ==
The Supreme Court dismissed the appeal in a unanimous judgment delivered by William Young J.

The Court held that Akulue's account did not satisfy the clear wording of s 24. The threats were not of immediate harm, and the person making them (Zuby) was not present when the offence took place in Auckland. The judges accepted that some flexibility exists in the section, but said the facts went too far: “presence as absence and immediate as sometime later” could not be accepted.

The Court also ruled that s 20 of the Crimes Act does not preserve a common law defence of necessity based on threats from another person. Parliament had set out the complete rules for compulsion by human threats in s 24. Allowing a separate common law defence would undermine that statutory scheme. Earlier proposals to widen the defence had not been passed into law, so the courts could not make the change themselves.

The Court considered but rejected the Canadian approach in R v Ruzic, which had struck down similar strict requirements on the basis of “moral involuntariness”. New Zealand courts cannot strike down legislation, and the New Zealand Bill of Rights Act does not require the same result.

== Significance ==
Akulue v R remains the leading authority on the defence of compulsion in New Zealand. It confirms that s 24 must be applied strictly according to its terms and that no common law defence of necessity is available for threats made by another person.

Legal commentators have criticised the decision for leaving the defence very narrow and ineffective in cases involving distant or non-immediate threats. Some scholars have called for Parliament to reform s 24, for example, by removing the presence requirement or adopting a test based on whether the defendant had a realistic choice (the “moral involuntariness” approach used in Canada). As of 2026, no legislative change has been made.

The case is regularly cited in textbooks and university courses as an example of the limited scope of the compulsion defence in New Zealand law.
