= R v Ruzic =

- Supreme Court of Canada

Hearing: June 13, 2000 Judgment: April 20, 2001
- Full case name: Her Majesty The Queen v Marijana Ruzic
- Citations: [2001] 1 SCR 687, 2001 SCC 24

Holding
- Section 7 of the Charter requires that the defence of duress be available to an accused even when they were not under immediate threat of bodily harm at the time the offence was committed

Court membership
- Chief Justice: Beverley McLachlin; Puisne Justices: Claire L'Heureux-Dubé, Charles Gonthier, Frank Iacobucci, John C. Major, Michel Bastarache, Ian Binnie, Louise Arbour, Louis LeBel

Reasons given
- Unanimous decision by: LeBel

R v Ruzic [2001] 1 S.C.R. 687, 2001 SCC 24 is a decision of the Supreme Court of Canada on the common law defence of duress and constitutionality of the defence under section 17 of the Criminal Code. The Court held that section 7 of the Canadian Charter of Rights and Freedoms requires that the defence of duress be available to an accused even when they were not under immediate threat of bodily harm at the time the offence was committed.

== Background ==
Marijana Ruzic was 21-year-old Yugoslavian who lived in Belgrade with her mother. A man had threatened to harm her unless she assisted him by smuggling heroin into Canada. The man stalked her for some time and began threatening her, eventually escalating to violent assaults. Ruzic eventually complied and flew to Canada. She was arrested at Toronto Pearson International Airport for importing heroin.

At trial, she pleaded that she only committed the crime under duress. A defence of duress, under section 17 of the Criminal Code, is available only when a person "commits an offence under compulsion by threats of immediate death or bodily harm from a person who is present when the offence is committed".

Ruzic claimed she had no other option and that both her and her mother's life were at risk. She also claimed that she could not go to the police because she believed them to be corrupt and would be of no help. Expert testimony validated this belief that Yugoslav citizens were generally untrusting of the police and their ability to protect them from rampant militias.

Nonetheless, her claim failed on the grounds that she was not under a threat of "immediate death or bodily harm" and that the man was not "present when the offence was committed".

Ruzic challenged section 17 of the Criminal Code as unconstitutional as it violated her right to security of person under section 7 of the Charter.

The trial judge agreed with Ruzic and held that the defence duress was available to her and consequently she was acquitted. The appeal was dismissed on appeal to the Court of Appeal for Ontario.

== Decision of the court ==
On April 20, 2001, the Supreme Court upheld the acquittal and dismissed the Crown appeal.

LeBel J, writing for a unanimous Court, held that section 17 of the Criminal Code violated section 7 of the Charter on the basis that its requirements were too restrictive by requiring presence and immediacy. The requirements meant the defence was unavailable in situations where the threat is to a third party or involves harm in the future.

LeBel agreed with the trial judge's finding that a common law defence of duress that did not have the same restrictions was also available. In the common law defence, the accused must make a reasonable effort to combat the threat, the severity of the criminal conduct must be proportional to the threat, and the accused must have no reasonable alternative of escape.

== See also ==
- List of Supreme Court of Canada cases (McLachlin Court)
- Akulue v R, a New Zealand Supreme Court decision that considered and rejected the approach to the defence of duress taken in R v Ruzic.
