= R v Heywood =

- Supreme Court of Canada

Hearing: April 27, 1994 Judgment: November 24, 1994
- Full case name: Her Majesty The Queen v Robert Lorne Heywood
- Citations: [1994] 3 S.C.R. 761
- Docket No.: 23384
- Ruling: Appeal dismissed, s.179(1)(b) of Criminal Code was struck down.

Court membership
- Chief Justice: Antonio Lamer; Puisne Justices: Gérard La Forest, Claire L'Heureux-Dubé, John Sopinka, Charles Gonthier, Peter Cory, Beverley McLachlin, Frank Iacobucci, John C. Major

Reasons given
- Majority: Cory J., joined by Lamer C.J. and Sopinka, Iacobucci and Major JJ.
- Dissent: Gonthier J., joined by La Forest, L'Heureux‑Dubé and McLachlin JJ.

R v Heywood 1994 3 S.C.R. 761 is a leading Supreme Court of Canada decision on the concept of fundamental justice in section seven of the Charter. The Court found that section 179(1)(b) of the Criminal Code for vagrancy was overbroad and thus violated section 7 and could not be saved under section 1.

== Background ==
In 1987, Heywood was convicted under section 246.1(1) (now s. 271(1)) of the Criminal Code for sexual assault of children. The conviction made him subject to section 179(1)(b) which prevented certain convicted individuals from loitering.

In July 1989, Heywood was arrested in Beacon Hill Park in Victoria for loitering "at or near a playground" under section 179(1). He had been spotted several times previously near the playground carrying a camera with a telephoto lens. Upon arrest the police got a search warrant and found collections of pictures of children at play.

At trial, Heywood argued that the law violated section 7, 11(d), 12, and 15 of the Charter. The court found a violation of 7 and 11(d) which was justified under section 1. Heywood was convicted. On appeal to the Supreme Court of the province, then to the provincial Court of Appeal the conviction was upheld. Finally, the Supreme Court of Canada affirmed the violations of section 7 and 11(d) but also found that they could not be saved under section 1, and so the conviction was overturned.

== Reasons of the court ==
In a 5 to 4 decision, the Court dismissed the appeal, finding a section 7 violation that could not be saved. The majority was written by Cory J. with Lamer C.J., Sopinka, Iacobucci, and Major JJ. concurring.

The case turned on the interpretation of the word "loiter" in section 179(1)(b) which states:

179. (1) Every one commits vagrancy who ...

(b) having at any time been convicted of an offence under section ... section 271..., is found loitering in or near a school ground, playground, public park or bathing area.

Cory states that the word should be given its ordinary, dictionary meaning, which is "to stand idly around, hang around, linger, tarry, saunter, delay, dawdle", and it does not contain any element of malevolent intent. He further claims that such a meaning supports the purpose of the section to protect children. "Malevolent intent" - a lesser degree of intent than unlawful intent - is too broad, vague, and subjective, says Cory.

Given this interpretation, Cory finds that the law infringes the principles of fundamental justice as it is more restrictive than necessary and applies too broadly. That is, "without prior notice to the accused, to too many places, to too many people, for an indefinite period with no possibility of review".

== Dissent ==
The dissent, written by Gonthier J., with La Forest, L'Heureux-Dubé, and McLachlin JJ. concurring, found that the word "loiter" required an element of "malevolent intent" and therefore was not overbroad and did not violate section 7.

== See also ==
- List of Supreme Court of Canada cases
