= R v Labaye =

- Supreme Court of Canada

Hearing: April 18, 2005 Judgment: December 21, 2005
- Full case name: Jean‑Paul Labaye v Her Majesty The Queen
- Citations: [2005] 3 S.C.R. 728, 2005 SCC 80
- Prior history: Judgment for the Crown in the Court of Appeal for Quebec.

Holding
- Acts of group sex at a swingers' club were not indecent within the meaning of s. 197(1) of the Criminal Code because the acts were relatively private and did not degrade participants. Therefore, the club was not a common bawdy house within the meaning of s. 210(1) of the Code.

Court membership
- Chief Justice: Beverley McLachlin; Puisne Justices: Michel Bastarache, Ian Binnie, Louis LeBel, Marie Deschamps, Morris Fish, Rosalie Abella, Louise Charron

Reasons given
- Majority: McLachlin, joined by Major, Binnie, Deschamps, Fish, Abella and Charron
- Dissent: Bastarache and LeBel

R v Labaye, [2005] 3 S.C.R. 728, 2005 SCC 80, is a decision by the Supreme Court of Canada on criminal indecency. The decision upheld consensual group sex and swinging activities in a club and alleged bawdy-house as being consistent with personal autonomy and liberty. Labaye was accompanied by a sister case, R v Kouri.

== Background ==
Jean‑Paul Labaye of Montreal was charged with operating a "common bawdy-house," a violation under section 210(1) of the Criminal Code, for owning the club l'Orage, in which persons who paid membership fees and their guests could assemble and engage in group sex and oral sex and masturbate. All of these activities were consensual and, while members paid the club membership fees, the members did not pay each other in exchange for sex. Having been found guilty, Mr. Labaye was fined $2,500.

== Decision ==
The majority of the Supreme Court, under Chief Justice Beverley McLachlin, held that Mr. Labaye should not have been convicted, thereby overturning the Quebec Court of Appeal. In determining whether Mr. Labaye was truly guilty of owning a bawdy-house, the Court had to decide whether the activities taking place within should be classified as indecent, since bawdy-houses are, by definition, houses in which prostitution or indecency occurs or is planned to occur. The Court first noted that morality was of no use to determining whether these activities were indecent. Only the objective standards of decency established in Canadian law would be of use, and those standards were concerned with whether any harm has been done. In reviewing precedent, which included Towne Cinema Theatres Ltd. v. The Queen (1985) and R. v. Butler (1992), the Court noted that it has been established, first in the 1985 case, that "obscenity" is defined as exceeding what Canadians would be able to socially accept (although there are some things that certain Canadians will not like but nevertheless will accept). Moreover, the obscenity must be harmful to certain people. In R. v. Butler and Little Sisters Book and Art Emporium v. Canada (Minister of Justice), it was further established that whether something harms or threatens harm to certain people is important in determining whether something is indecent, and indeed harm became the only measure of indecency in Canadian law. (The dissent disputed this point, arguing that only now, with this decision, had harm become the only measure.) At any rate, in R. v. Labaye, the Court approved of the harm-only approach and wrote that "Harm or significant risk of harm is easier to prove than a community standard" of decency. The Court went on to establish more guidelines as to how to measure harm.

First, the Court wrote that what is indecent under the Criminal Code is what is contrary to principles in constitutional or other important laws. The whole of society has beliefs on what it needs to operate; the beliefs of individuals or certain political beliefs that something might be harmful is, in contrast, not enough. Moreover, the harm in indecency must be serious. The Court explored these definitions in depth, noting that values that can be said to be essential to society include liberty and equality. Freedom of religion, another key Canadian value, indicates that no particular religion will shape the definition of indecency. Hence, indecency in Canadian law is something that threatens someone's liberty, exposes something undesirable to people, forces someone to commit a misdeed (this includes material "depraving and corrupting susceptible people" and "material that perpetuates negative and demeaning images"), or harms someone engaging in certain acts.

In examining the question of what cases in which people are exposed to things they do not want to see can be considered indecent, the Court was mindful that sex is a more open subject in society, but nevertheless "there may be some kinds of sexual conduct the public display of which seriously impairs the livability of the environment and significantly constrains autonomy." This was especially important to the law at the basis of R. v. Labaye. It was concluded that in this particular case, Mr. Labaye was not guilty of indecency because of the actions he took to make sure only willing people would see the sexual conduct.

In considering the issue of whether the harm is serious, the Court wrote that "The threshold is high"; certain things that certain Canadians will not like should be allowed to exist, unless it becomes so serious it threatens the society. While the measurement of the seriousness of the indecency would involve some "value judgements," the Court wrote that some objective guides could be provided by avoiding unwritten values, and by considering circumstances. In cases where the indecency is of a kind where people are exposed to undesirable things, an accused would be guilty if there is "a real risk that the way people live will be significantly and adversely affected by the conduct." Consent to see the activity will not amount to harm or indecency. In this particular case, the Court found that the seriousness of the harm need not even be considered because no evidence of harm was found, and even so "there appears to be no evidence that the degree of alleged harm rose to the level of incompatibility with the proper functioning of society. Consensual conduct behind code-locked doors can hardly be supposed to jeopardize a society as vigorous and tolerant as Canadian society."

The Court added the case was different from R. v. Butler because nothing was involved that encouraged sexist attitudes. "There is no evidence of anti-social attitudes toward women," the Court wrote, "or for that matter men." This was because all of the sex was consensual and not prostitution. Nor was the threat of sexually transmitted diseases enough to constitute harm in relation to the specific charge of indecency. This is because these diseases are more of a health issue than a harm that comes exclusively from deviant sex.

== Dissent ==
A lengthy dissent was written by Justices Michel Bastarache and Louis LeBel. The dissenting justices criticized the majority's definition of indecency as "neither desirable nor workable," since it did not follow certain precedent and discarded the "contextual analysis of the Canadian community standard of tolerance". While harm is an important consideration, that does not mean Canadians would be able to accept certain sexual conduct. Standards can be drawn upon "principles of social morality drawn from legislation." Moreover, the importance given to harm in R. v. Butler was "adopted to fill a vacuum," to connect past case law regarding community standards to views that some material encourages sexist attitudes, and "it does not follow from Butler, Tremblay and Mara that the courts must determine what the community tolerates by reference to the degree of harm alone." In this particular case, the dissenting justices believed that the screening out of people who did not want to see the sexual conduct was not rigorous enough, and that "The community does not tolerate the performance of acts of this nature in a place of business to which the public has easy access."

== See also ==
- List of Supreme Court of Canada cases (McLachlin Court)
