= Operation Dismantle v. The Queen =

- Supreme Court of Canada

Hearing: 14–15 February 1984 Judgment: 9 May 1985
- Citations: [1985] 1 SCR 441
- Docket No.: 18154
- Prior history: Appeal from the Federal Court of Appeal
- Ruling: Appeal dismissed.

Court membership
- Chief Justice: Bora Laskin; Puisne Justices: Roland Ritchie, Brian Dickson, Jean Beetz, Willard Estey, William McIntyre, Julien Chouinard, Antonio Lamer, Bertha Wilson

Reasons given
- Majority: Dickson (Estey, McIntyre, Chouinard and Lamer concurring)
- Concurrence: Wilson
- Laskin, Ritchie and Beetz took no part in the consideration or decision of the case.

Operation Dismantle v. The Queen [1985] 1 S.C.R. 441 is a decision by the Supreme Court of Canada where the court rejected a section 7 Charter challenge against the federal government for allowing the US government to test cruise missiles over Canadian territory.

It was argued that the use of cruise missiles by the US government increased the risk of nuclear war and that Canada's participation made Canada a more likely target.

Chief Justice Brian Dickson, writing for the majority, struck down the claim on the basis that given the unpredictability of foreign policy decisions of sovereign nations, suggestion of an increase in danger can only be speculative. It would be impossible to prove a causal link between the testing and the increased threat.

In her reasons, Justice Wilson dismissed the use of the political question in Canadian law. She examined the jurisprudence behind the doctrine identified its basis in the core US constitutional principle of the separation of powers. She distinguished this from Canadian constitutional law where separation is not a core principle, but rather is only secondary. Instead, there is a foundation in overlap between the branches as demonstrated in the system of responsible government. Wilson concludes that section 24 of the Charter requires judicial review of the executive branch of the government. For an issue to be justiciable the question must raise a legal issue. She further noted that exercise of the royal prerogative can be judicially reviewed under section 32 of the Charter.
