= Rathke's cleft cyst =

Benign cystic growth on the pituitary gland

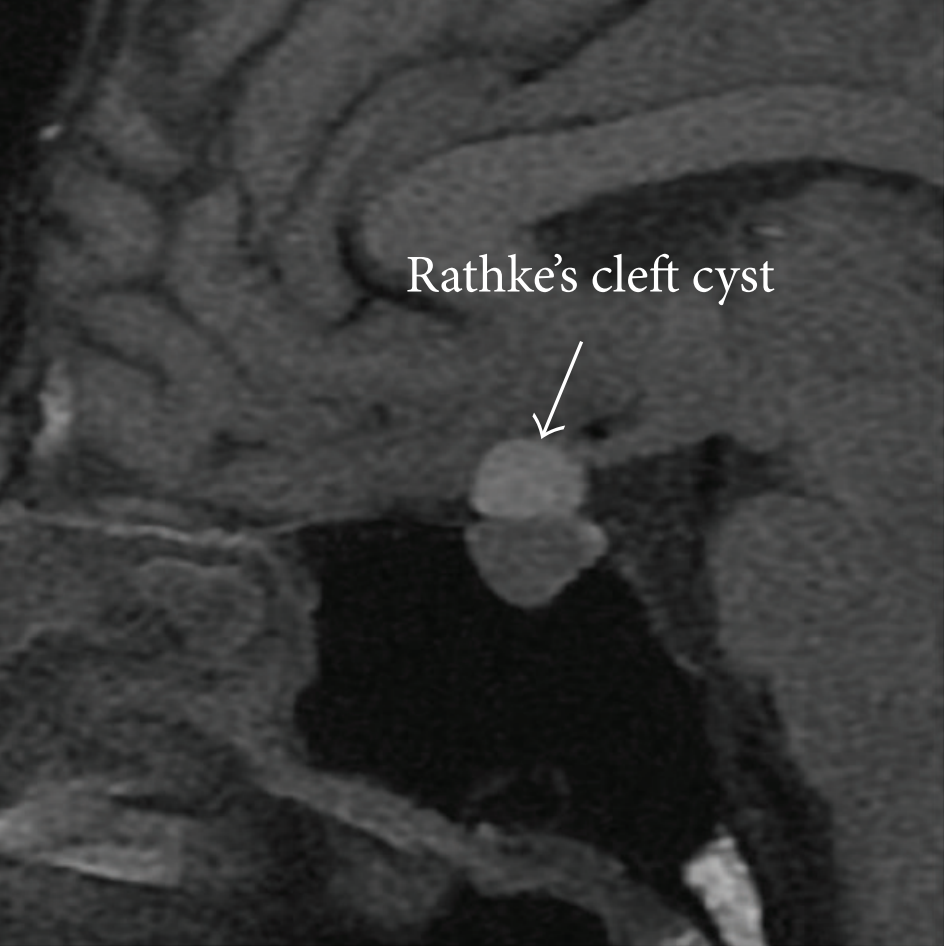
- Rathke's cleft cyst in a 53-year-old man with a pituitary adenoma and acromegaly

A Rathke's cleft cyst is a benign growth on the pituitary gland in the brain, specifically a mucin-filled cyst in the posterior portion of the anterior pituitary gland. It occurs when the Rathke's pouch does not develop properly and ranges in size from 2 to 40 mm in diameter.

Asymptomatic cysts are commonly detected during autopsies in 2 to 26 percent of individuals who have died of unrelated causes. Females are twice as likely as males to develop a cyst. If a cyst adds pressure to the optic chiasm, it may cause visual disturbances, pituitary dysfunction and headaches. The majority of pituitary patients with chronic headaches have Rathke's cleft cysts. This is believed to be caused by the constant change in volume and the drastic changes in vasopressure from fluctuations in gonadotrophs and ADH.

The treatment of choice for symptomatic cysts is drainage and taking a biopsy. Radical excision is more dangerous because of the potential of damaging the patient's pituitary function e.g. ADH storage and lowering growth hormone production.
