= Jacques Chaoulli =

French-Canadian physician (born 1952)

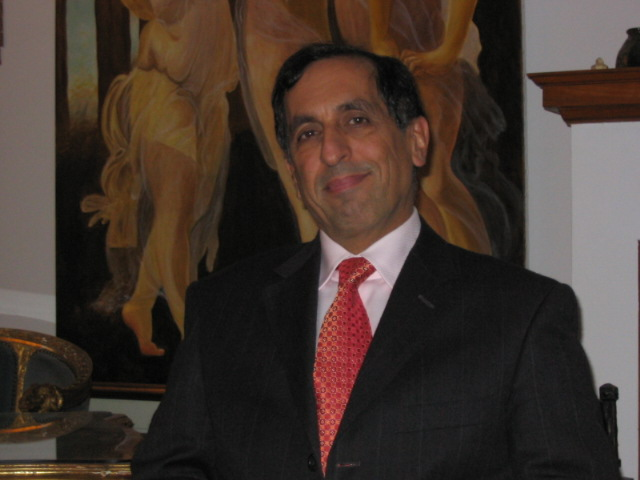
- Chaoulli at home
- Born: 1952 (age 73–74); France
- Education: Paris Diderot University; Université Laval
- Medical career
- Profession: General practitioner
- Field: Medicine

Jacques Chaoulli (born 1952) is a physician best known for launching a Supreme Court challenge against the ban in Quebec on private health care. He has French and Canadian citizenship.

== Biography ==
Chaoulli was born in France in 1952 and earned a medical degree from the Paris Diderot University. In 1978, he moved to Quebec to study medical education and earned a Master's degree from Université Laval in 1982. Chaoulli has practiced medicine in Quebec since 1986 and is now a general practitioner in France.

In 2005, Chaoulli launched a court challenge against the Quebec government with the Supreme Court of Canada, arguing the Canadian implementation of publicly funded health care was not effective at delivering an adequate level of care. After losing in two lower courts, he won the Chaoulli v. Quebec (Attorney General), the Supreme Court's decision on the case, causing a change in the Quebec government's policy on wait times and privatization.

In 2006, he called for further privatization to improve wait times.
