= Blencoe v British Columbia (Human Rights Commission) =

- Supreme Court of Canada

Hearing: January 24, 2000 Judgment: October 5, 2000
- Full case name: The British Columbia Human Rights Commission, the Commissioner of Investigation and Mediation, the British Columbia Human Rights Tribunal and Andrea Willis v. Robin Blencoe
- Citations: 2000 SCC 44, [2000] 2 S.C.R. 307
- Docket No.: 26789
- Prior history: Judgment for Blencoe in the British Columbia Court of Appeal.
- Ruling: Appeal allowed.

Holding
- 1. Section 7 of the Canadian Charter of Rights and Freedoms applies to administrative bodies, such as human rights tribunals.; 2. "Liberty" in section 7 of the Charter is broader than physical liberty, and includes where state compulsions or prohibitions affect life choices.; 3. "Security of the person" in section 7 of the Charter includes psychological harm, but the harm must be caused by state actions, and must be serious.; 4. Section 7 of the Charter outside of a criminal law context does not include the principles in section 11(b) of the Charter.

Court membership
- Chief Justice: Beverley McLachlin; Puisne Justices: Claire L'Heureux-Dubé, Charles Gonthier, Frank Iacobucci, John C. Major, Michel Bastarache, Ian Binnie, Louise Arbour, Louis LeBel

Reasons given
- Majority: Bastarache J., joined by McLachlin C.J. and L'Heureux-Dubé, Gonthier, and Major JJ.
- Concur/dissent: LeBel J., joined by Iacobucci, Binnie, and Arbour JJ.

Blencoe v British Columbia (Human Rights Commission) [2000] 2 S.C.R. 307, 2000 SCC 44 is a leading Supreme Court of Canada decision on the scope of section 7 of the Canadian Charter of Rights and Freedoms, and on the administrative law principle of natural justice.

== Background ==
Robin Blencoe had been a minister of the British Columbia government for several years when Fran Yanor went public with a claim of sexual harassment and filed to the British Columbia Human Rights Council (later the British Columbia Human Rights Commission). Several months later two other women filed complaints for sexual harassment.

Due to delays to the tribunal hearings the claims were not resolved for 30 months after the first filing in 1995.

During this time Blencoe was subjected to vast media coverage that contributed to the ruin of his career, and to his and his family's social and psychological hardship.

== Judicial history ==
Blencoe challenged the delay of the Human Rights Commission in the British Columbia Supreme Court on the basis of denial of natural justice. The court dismissed his challenge.

Blencoe appealed to the British Columbia Court of Appeal on the basis that the delay of the hearing for over 30 months was a violation of his right to "security of person" under section 7 of the Charter. The Court found in favour of Blencoe and ordered the charges against him to be stayed. The Court held that the delay stigmatized him and caused undue harm to him and his family, which violated his rights under section 7 of the Charter.

The issues appealed to the Supreme Court were:

1. Whether the delay violated Blencoe's section 7 rights.
2. Whether the delay violated the administrative law rule against undue delay.

In a five-to-four decision, the Court overturned the decision of the Court of Appeal, and held that the delay did not violate the Charter or administrative law.

== Reasons of the court ==
Justice Bastarache, writing for the majority, dismissed Blencoe's claim and held that the tribunal should proceed.

=== Section 7 ===
Justice Bastarache examines the applicability of section 7. He finds that section 7 can extend "beyond the sphere of criminal law, at least where there is 'state action which directly engages the justice system and its administration'."

The process of analyzing section 7, states Bastarache, has two steps. First, it must be determined if there has been a violation of life, liberty, or security of person. Second, the violation must be shown to be contrary to the principles of fundamental justice.

Bastarache examined the meaning of "liberty" and "security of person". "Liberty", he argues, is related to personal autonomy. It is "engaged where state compulsions or prohibitions affect important and fundamental life choices." "Security of person" concerns psychological harm. It must be established that the state caused actual psychological harm, and that there have been serious injuries.

Considering Blencoe's claims, Bastarache found that there was no violation of liberty as the delay did not affect any fundamental life choices. There was also no violation of security of person as the harm was caused by the accusations not by the delay itself, which did not have much effect one way or another.

=== Administrative delay ===
The issue identified by Bastarache was "whether the delay in this case could amount to a denial of natural justice even where the respondent's ability to have a fair hearing has not been compromised." He dismissed the possibility that the trial was not fair as he saw no evidence to suggest that Blencoe was not able to provide a full answer and defence.

Bastarache considered whether the delay violated natural justice by causing serious harm to Blencoe. He found that the harm only amounted to personal hardship and was not serious.

He then considered whether the delay violated natural justice by bringing the Human Rights Commission into disrepute. The Court noted that many of the delays were contributed to by Blencoe or consented to by him. Consequently, the Commission was not brought into disrepute.

== Dissent ==
Justice LeBel, in dissent, held that there was a violation of administrative law; however, he did not consider this to be a Charter issue.

== See also ==
- List of Supreme Court of Canada cases (McLachlin Court)
