= Congrégation des témoins de Jéhovah de St-Jérôme-Lafontaine v Lafontaine (Village of) =

- Supreme Court of Canada

Hearing: January 19, 2004 Judgment: June 30, 2004
- Citations: 2004 SCC 48, [2004] 2 SCR 650
- Docket No.: 29507

Court membership
- Chief Justice: Beverley McLachlin; Puisne Justices: Frank Iacobucci, John C. Major, Michel Bastarache, Ian Binnie, Louise Arbour, Louis LeBel, Marie Deschamps, Morris Fish

Reasons given
- Majority: McLachlin C.J., joined by Iacobucci, Binnie, Arbour and Fish JJ.
- Dissent: LeBel J., joined by Bastarache and Deschamps JJ.
- Dissent: Major J.

Congrégation des témoins de Jéhovah de St-Jérôme-Lafontaine v Lafontaine (Village of), 2004 SCC 48, is a leading Supreme Court of Canada decision in Canadian administrative law. The case applied the Baker framework for analysing the duty of fairness owed by an administrative decision-maker to a zoning request made to a municipality and found that the municipal government owed a duty of procedural fairness to the applicant in the way that it assessed and responded to their rezoning application.

== Facts ==
The Congrégation des témoins de Jéhovah de St-Jérôme-Lafontaine ("the congregation") desired to build a place of worship in the village of Lafontaine, Quebec. According to the Act respecting land use planning and development, such a religious establishment must be on land with a "P-3" zoning designation. The congregation was not able to locate any suitable land for sale with such a designation. Consequently, the congregation entered into an agreement to purchase a plot of land with a different zoning, the sale being conditional on the municipality authorizing the re-zoning of the land.

The municipality refused the request to re-zone the land after conducting an extensive study and providing detailed reasons for the decision, which primarily related to residential tax rates. The congregation responded to the municipality's decision by finding a different piece of land and again applied for rezoning of that land. The municipality then summarily denied that rezoning application, noting only that P-3 land was available elsewhere. When the congregation was again unable to find suitable land zoned P-3, after a four-year-long search, they applied for a third time to the municipality to rezone a piece of land which they could purchase. The municipality again summarily denied their application without providing reasons. At this point, the congregation turned to the courts to challenge the fairness of the municipality's decision.

== Decision ==
=== Duty of municipality ===
In order to determine the duty that the municipality owed to the congregation, the court applied the five-part test from Baker. The court concluded that the municipality owed a duty of fairness to the congregation after assessing the five factors:

1. The nature of the decision and the decision-making process employed by the public organ
2. The nature of the statutory scheme and the precise statutory provisions pursuant to which the public body operates
3. The importance of the decision to the individuals affected
4. The legitimate expectations of the party challenging the decision
5. The nature of the deference accorded to the body

Specifically, the court ruled that the content of the duty of procedural fairness owed the congregation was that the municipality was required to carefully evaluate the congregation's applications for a zoning variance and to give reasons for refusing the applications.

=== Remedy ===
The court found that "the Municipality acted in a manner that was arbitrary and straddled the boundary separating good from bad faith." Accordingly, the court set aside the second and third rezoning refusals as they did not comply with the law. The court ordered the municipality to reconsider the congregation's application. The congregation had argued that such as a remedy was inadequate because it argued that the municipality was likely to again refuse the application though with proper reasons.

However, the court rejected that argument because it implies that the congregation was entitled to a particular substantive decision, instead of merely to a fair process. Additionally, the court was unable to conclude on the facts whether or not the municipality was acting in bad faith in denying the congregation's second and third rezoning applications.

== See also ==
- List of Supreme Court of Canada cases
