= Security of person =

Human right

Security of the person is a basic entitlement guaranteed by the Universal Declaration of Human Rights, adopted by the United Nations in 1948. It is also a human right explicitly defined and guaranteed by the European Convention on Human Rights, the Constitution of Canada, the Constitution of South Africa and other laws around the world.

In general, the right to the security of one's person is associated with liberty and includes the right, if one is imprisoned unlawfully, to a remedy such as habeas corpus. Security of person can also be seen as an expansion of rights based on prohibitions of torture and cruel and unusual punishment. Rights to security of person can guard against less lethal conduct, and can be used in regard to prisoners' rights.

== United Nations ==
The right to security of the person is guaranteed by Article 3 of the Universal Declaration of Human Rights. In this article, it is combined with the right to life and liberty. In full, the article reads, "Everyone has the right to life, liberty and security of person."

The United Nations treaty, the International Covenant on Civil and Political Rights (1966), also recognizes a right to security of person. Article 3 states that "Everyone has the right to liberty and security of person," and the section prohibits "arbitrary arrest or detention." The section continues, "No one shall be deprived of his liberty except on such grounds and in accordance with such procedure as are established by law."

== Europe ==
The right to security of the person is mentioned in Article 5(1) of the European Convention on Human Rights under the heading Right to liberty and security ("Everyone has the right to liberty and security of person. No one shall be deprived of his liberty save in the following cases and in accordance with a procedure prescribed by law") and in Article 6 of the Charter of Fundamental Rights of the European Union ("Everyone has the right to liberty and security of person").

== Canada ==
The right to security of the person was recognized in Canada in the Canadian Bill of Rights in 1960. Section 1(a) of this law recognized "the right of the individual to life, liberty, security of the person and enjoyment of property, and the right not to be deprived thereof except by due process of law." However, the Bill of Rights was a statute and not part of the Constitution.

In 1982, a right to security of the person was added to the Constitution. It was included in section 7 of the Canadian Charter of Rights and Freedoms, which stipulates that "Everyone has the right to life, liberty and security of the person and the right not to be deprived thereof except in accordance with the principles of fundamental justice." Security of the person in section 7 consists of rights to privacy of the body and its health and of the right protecting the "psychological integrity" of an individual. That is, the right protects against significant government-inflicted harm (stress) to the mental state of the individual. (Blencoe v. B.C. (Human Rights Commission), 2000)

This right has generated significant case law, as abortion in Canada was legalized in R. v. Morgentaler (1988) after the Supreme Court found the Therapeutic Abortion Committees breached women's security of person by threatening their health. Some judges also felt control of the body was a right within security of the person, breached by the abortion law. In Operation Dismantle v. The Queen (1985) cruise missile testing was unsuccessfully challenged as violating security of the person for risking nuclear war. In Chaoulli v. Quebec (Attorney General) (2005), some Supreme Court justices even considered Quebec's ban on private health care to breach security of the person, since delays in medical treatment could have physical and stressful consequences.

There has been discussion within the Supreme Court and among academics as to whether security of the person also guarantees some economic rights. Theoretically, security of the person would be breached if the government limits a person's ability to make an income, by denying welfare, taking away property essential to one's profession, or denying licenses. However, section 7 is primarily concerned with legal rights, so this reading of economic rights is questionable. Many economic issues could also be political questions.

== South Africa ==
In 1996 the government of South Africa adopted a constitutional Bill of Rights which recognized a right to security of the person in section 12. Here, it was combined with a "right to freedom." Section 12 went on to define security of the person and the right to freedom more thoroughly, including within it bodily control and reproductive control, freedom from torture and cruel and unusual punishment and a right to trial. In full, section 12 reads,

12. (1) Everyone has the right to freedom and security of the person, which includes the right

(a) not to be deprived of freedom arbitrarily or without just cause;
(b) not to be detained without trial;
(c) to be free from all forms of violence from either public or private sources;
(d) not to be tortured in any way; and
(e) not to be treated or punished in a cruel, inhuman or degrading way.

(2) Everyone has the right to bodily and psychological integrity, which includes the right

(a) to make decisions concerning reproduction;
(b) to security in and control over their body; and
(c) not to be subjected to medical or scientific experiments without their informed consent.

== Turkey ==
The Constitution of Turkey guarantees security of person, along with the right to liberty, in Article 19, enacted in 1982 and amended in 2001. The article spells out limits to these rights in the form of rulings of courts under the law, allowing for mental institutions and institutions for addicts, extradition, etc. The article also limits arrest and detention to cases in which a judge allows it, where there is not enough time for this, or the person is seen being responsible for a crime. A person will then be told why they have been arrested, and their next of kin will also be told of the arrest. Finally, the article allows for government compensation if these rights are violated.

== New Zealand ==
The New Zealand Bill of Rights Act, adopted in 1990, guarantees "Life and security of the person" in sections 8 through 11. Section 8 guarantees a right to life except when deprived in accordance with fundamental justice, while section 9 prohibits cruel and unusual punishment. Section 10 prohibits a person being subjected to medical treatment against his or her will. Finally, section 11 gives a New Zealander the right to not take medical treatment.

== United Kingdom ==
Security of person is mentioned in Schedule I Article 5 of the Human Rights Act 1998. This version is the latest incarnation of the Act, though there have been minor edits since. This new act represents one aspect of Tony Blair's promised constitutional reforms.

== See also ==
- Anti-discrimination law
- Consumer protection
- Human security
- Right to personal identity
- Right to property
- Operations security
