= R v Mapara =

- Supreme Court of Canada

Hearing: 16 December 2004 Judgment: 27 April 2005
- Full case name: Sameer Mapara v Her Majesty The Queen
- Citations: [2005] 1 SCR 358, 2005 SCC 23
- Docket No.: 29750
- Prior history: On appeal from the Court of Appeal for British Columbia.

Court membership
- Chief Justice: Beverley McLachlin; Puisne Justices: John C. Major, Michel Bastarache, Ian Binnie, Louis LeBel, Marie Deschamps, Morris Fish, Rosalie Abella, Louise Charron

Reasons given
- Majority: McLachlin C.J., joined by Bastarache, Binnie, Abella and Charron JJ.
- Concurrence: LeBel J., joined by Fish J.
- Major and Deschamps JJ. took no part in the consideration or decision of the case.

R v Mapara, 2005 1 S.C.R. 358, 2005 SCC 23, was a decision by the Supreme Court of Canada on criminal conspiracy.

== See also ==
- List of Supreme Court of Canada cases (McLachlin Court)
