= Convention for the Suppression of the Circulation of and Traffic in Obscene Publications =

1923 multilateral anti-pornography treaty

The Convention for the Suppression of the Circulation of and Traffic in Obscene Publications is a 1923 League of Nations anti-pornography treaty that was initially negotiated and concluded in Geneva. It was amended by a 1947 Protocol and as of 2013 has 56 state parties.

The treaty was concluded on 12 September 1923 as the International Convention for the Suppression of the Circulation of and Traffic in Obscene Publications and entered into force on 7 August 1924. It was intended to supplement the 1910 Agreement for the Suppression of the Circulation of Obscene Publications. By the 1923 Convention, states agreed to criminalise the production, possession, importation, exportation, trade, advertisement, or display of "obscene writings, drawings, prints, paintings, printed matter, pictures, posters, emblems, photographs, cinematograph films or any other obscene objects".

On 20 October 1947, a Protocol to the Convention was approved by the United Nations General Assembly as resolution 126 (II)2. On 12 November 1947, a United Nations conference at Lake Success, New York approved the Protocol and opened it for signature. One amendment that the Protocol made was dropping the word "International" from the name of the Convention.

As of 2013, the amended Convention has 56 state parties. The unamended Convention remains in force for one state, Zimbabwe. Denmark (1968), Germany (1974), and the Netherlands (1986, solely for the Kingdom in Europe) have denounced the Convention.
