= R v Kouri =

- Supreme Court of Canada

Hearing: April 18, 2005 Judgment: December 21, 2005
- Full case name: Her Majesty The Queen v James Kouri
- Citations: [2005] 3 S.C.R. 789, 2005 SCC 81
- Prior history: Acquittal in the Court of Appeal for Quebec.

Holding
- Acts of group sex at a swingers' club were not indecent within the meaning of s. 197(1) of the Criminal Code because the acts were relatively private and did not degrade participants. Therefore, the club was not a common bawdy house within the meaning of s. 210(1) of the Code.

Court membership
- Chief Justice: Beverley McLachlin; Puisne Justices: Michel Bastarache, Ian Binnie, Louis LeBel, Marie Deschamps, Morris Fish, Rosalie Abella, Louise Charron

Reasons given
- Majority: McLachlin, joined by Major, Binnie, Deschamps, Fish, Abella and Charron
- Dissent: Bastarache and LeBel

R v Kouri [2005] 3 S.C.R. 789, 2005 SCC 81, was a decision of the Supreme Court of Canada that, along with its sister case R v Labaye, established that harm is the sole defining element of indecency in Canadian criminal law. The case involved a club in which couples engaged in group sex; the club was alleged to be a "common bawdy-house" (a house in which indecency or prostitution occurs). The trial court convicted Kouri, but the Quebec Court of Appeal set aside the conviction and entered and acquittal. The Supreme Court upheld the acquittal.

== Background ==
In 1997, James Kouri, the owner of the Montreal club Coeur à Corps, was accused of operating a common bawdy-house, convicted at trial, and fined $7,500 under section 210(1) of the Criminal Code. The fine came after undercover investigations of the club by police that started in 1996, although the club had been established in 1985. The group sex club was for couples who, upon entering, would be asked if they were a "liberated couple." Only those who replied in the affirmative could enter, and the couples would have to pay an entrance fee.

On appeal to the Quebec Court of Appeal, Kouri was acquitted.

== Decision ==
The majority of the Supreme Court upheld the acquittal. As the test for defining indecency, necessary in order to answer whether Kouri was guilty of operating a bawdy-house, was set out in R v Labaye, the Court in R v Kouri concentrated on whether sufficient measures were taken by Kouri so that the public was not exposed to something they would not want to see. Had Kouri not done so, he might have been guilty of indecency. The Court took the view that the Crown did not effectively prove its case against Kouri.

The court held that the Crown had no evidence of anyone being forced to watch the sexual activities in the club, nor of anyone in the club being surprised to see group sex. Whether a couple was a "liberated couple" was viewed as a "sufficiently clear and comprehensive" means to ensure only knowing and willing couples would enter, given the context of the outside of the club, which had sexually themed images present. It thus did not matter that there was no explicit cautionary message at the entrance that sexual conduct might be seen inside.

The Crown had also argued that it was not known whether every couple was asked if they were "liberated" before they were admitted, and indeed some of the police had not been asked that question when they had entered the bar. The police corroborated the evidence that not every couple was asked this with the anecdote that a woman once left the club "upset with her partner".

The Court responded to these concerns by noting that the fact that this woman became upset does not mean she was surprised to see sexual conduct in the club; there are other possible reasons for her unhappiness. Even if she was unhappy to see group sex when the activity actually occurred, that does not prove she had not agreed to see this activity in the first place. Moreover, while some police were not asked the "liberated couple" question, that did not prove that all other couples were not asked the question the first time they came to the club.

Kouri might also have been guilty of indecency had the club encouraged degrading views of certain people. The Court, however, found no evidence that Kouri was guilty of this, noting that the activity was consensual and no money was exchanged between the persons having sex. While there was an entrance fee, this was not paid to anyone for a sexual service, but rather to enter the club to use the bar and engage in sexual activity with others.

== See also ==
- List of Supreme Court of Canada cases (McLachlin Court)
