= Agreement for the Suppression of the Circulation of Obscene Publications =

Multilateral anti-pornography treaty

The Agreement for the Suppression of the Circulation of Obscene Publications is a multilateral anti-pornography treaty that was initially negotiated and concluded in Paris in 1910. It was amended by a 1949 Protocol. As of 2013, the treaty has 57 state parties.

The treaty was concluded on 4 May 1910 in Paris and was initially entitled the Agreement for the Repression of Obscene Publications. The treaty was initially agreed to by a number of states, including France, Germany, Austria-Hungary, Russia, and Great Britain. Through the treaty, the states agreed to designate a government authority tasked with sharing with the other states information regarding obscenity offences "where the various acts constituting the offence have taken place in different countries". The treaty applied to "obscene writings, designs, pictures or objects". In 1923, states agreed to criminalise the creation, distribution, and trade of obscene works via the Convention for the Suppression of the Circulation of and Traffic in Obscene Publications.

In 1948, the United Nations General Assembly agreed to a Protocol which would amend the 1910 treaty. On 4 May 1949 at Lake Success, New York, the Protocol was signed by a number of states. Ultimately, the Protocol was ratified by 35 states, which caused the revised treaty to come into force on 1 March 1950. One of the changes made by the Protocol was the name of the treaty. As of 2013, the 1949 version of the treaty remains in force and has 57 state parties.

== Signatures and ratifications of the 1910 treaty ==
The following states ratified the 1910 treaty:

State	Date signed	Date ratified, acceded or succeeded	Notes
Principality of Albania	–		
Austria-Hungary	1910	1910	
Belgium	1910	1910	
Brazil	1910	1910	
Kingdom of Bulgaria	–		
Republic of China	–		
Czechoslovakia	–		
Czech Republic	–	1993	
Denmark	1910	1910	
Kingdom of Egypt	–		
Estonia	–		
Fiji	–	1971	
Finland	–		
French Republic	1910	1910	
German Empire	1910	1910	
Irish Free State	–		
Kingdom of Italy	1910	1910	
Latvia	–		
Liberia	–	2005	
Luxembourg	–		
Monaco	–		
Netherlands	1910	1910	
Norway	–		
Poland	–		
Kingdom of Portugal	1910	1910	
Kingdom of Romania	–		
San Marino	–		
Slovakia	–	1993	
Spain	1910	1910	
Switzerland	1910	1910	
Thailand	–		
United Kingdom	1910	1910	
Zimbabwe	–	1998	

== Ratifications of the 1949 treaty ==
State	Date ratified, acceded or succeeded	Notes
Australia	1949	
Austria	1950	
Belarus	1998	
Belgium	1952	
Burma	1949	
Cambodia	1959	
Canada	1949	
Republic of China	1949	This ratification is currently in force for the People's Republic of China. Upon resuming the exercise of sovereignty over Hong Kong in 1997, the China declared that the agreement would continue to be in force in Hong Kong.
Cuba	1983	
Cyprus	1963	
Czechoslovakia	1951	
Czech Republic	1993	
Democratic Republic of the Congo	1962	Ratified as "Republic of the Congo".
Denmark	1950	
Kingdom of Egypt	1949	
Fiji	1971	
Finland	1949	
France	1949	
Ghana	1958	
Haiti	1953	
Iceland	1950	
India	1949	
Iran	1959	
Iraq	1950	
Ireland	1952	
Italy	1952	
Jamaica	1964	
Jordan	1959	
Lesotho	1975	
Liberia	2005	
Luxembourg	1955	
Madagascar	1963	
Malawi	1965	
Ireland	1952	
(Malaysia) Federation of Malaya	1957	This ratification is currently in force for Malaysia.
Malta	1967	
Mauritius	1969	
Mexico	1952	
Montenegro	2006	
Netherlands	1950	
New Zealand	1950	
Nigeria	1961	
Norway	1949	
Pakistan	1951	
Romania	1950	
Serbia and Montenegro	2001	Ratified as the "Federal Republic of Yugoslavia". This ratification is currently in force for Serbia.
Sierra Leone	1962	
Slovakia	1993	
Solomon Islands	1981	
South Africa	1950	
Soviet Union	1949	This ratification is currently in force for the Russian Federation.
(Dominion of Ceylon) Sri Lanka	1949	Ratified as "Ceylon".
Switzerland	1949	
Tanganyika	1962	This ratification is currently in force for Tanzania.
Trinidad and Tobago	1966	
Turkey	1950	
United Kingdom	1949	
Yugoslavia	1953	
Zambia	1974	
