= Chaoulli v Quebec (AG) =

- Supreme Court of Canada

Hearing: June 8, 2004 Judgment: June 9, 2005
- Full case name: Jacques Chaoulli and George Zeliotis v. Attorney General of Quebec and Attorney General of Canada
- Citations: 2005 SCC 35
- Prior history: Judgment for the Attorneys General in the Quebec Court of Appeal
- Ruling: Chaoulli appeal allowed

Holding
- Section 15 of the Health Insurance Act and section 11 of the Hospital Insurance Act, which outlaw private medical insurance, violate the right to personal inviolability as guaranteed by the Quebec Charter of Human Rights and Freedoms

Court membership
- Chief Justice: Beverley McLachlin; Puisne Justices: John C. Major, Michel Bastarache, Ian Binnie, Louis LeBel, Marie Deschamps, Morris Fish, Rosalie Abella, Louise Charron

Reasons given
- Majority: Deschamps
- Concurrence: McLachlin and Major, joined by Bastarache
- Dissent: Binnie and LeBel, joined by Fish

Chaoulli v Quebec (AG) [2005] 1 S.C.R. 791, 2005 SCC 35, was a decision by the Supreme Court of Canada of which the court ruled that the Quebec Health Insurance Act and the Hospital Insurance Act prohibiting private medical insurance in the face of long wait times, up to nine months, violated the Quebec Charter of Human Rights and Freedoms. In a 4 to 3 decision, the court found the acts violated Quebecers' right to life and security of person under the Quebec Charter. The ruling is binding only in Quebec. Three of the seven judges also found that the laws violated section seven of the Canadian Charter of Rights and Freedoms. One judge did not rule on the Canadian Charter. The result was a 3–3 tie on the question of the Canadian Charter, so the Chaoulli decision does not apply to any other province.

== Background ==
Having suffered in the past from numerous health problems including a hip replacement, 73-year-old salesman George Zeliotis became an advocate for reducing waiting times for patients in Quebec hospitals.

Jacques Chaoulli is a doctor who provided home appointments to patients. He attempted to get a licence to offer his services as an independent private hospital but was rejected due to provincial legislation prohibiting private health insurance.

Together, the two men sought a declaratory judgment to contest the prohibition.

== Court's opinions ==
Three separate opinions were written. The first is by Deschamps who found a violation of the Quebec Charter, but stated there was no necessity for her to rule on the Canadian Charter. A second opinion was written by McLachlin C.J. and Major J., with Bastarache J. concurring, on the violation of section seven. A dissenting opinion was given by Binnie and LeBel JJ. with Fish J. concurring in dissent. .

The appeal court's characterization of the issue as an infringement of an economic right is rejected by Deschamps. She goes on to note that the long waits at hospitals can result in deaths and that private health care prohibited by the Quebec Acts would likely have saved those lives. The wait lists, she claims, are an implicit form of rationing, and it is the government's rationing policy that is being challenged here as a violation of the right to "security of person" (per Canadian Charter) and "personal inviolability" (per Quebec Charter).

Deschamps sides with the trial judge, who found a violation of section 7 of the Canadian Charter, but she interprets it as being more of a violation of the similar section 1 of the Quebec Charter. She adopts a broad interpretation, citing R. v. Morgentaler among others as examples of delay in medical treatment as a violation of security of person. She further rejects the dissenters' suggestion that a patient could seek medical treatment outside of the province as too extreme and case-specific.

Turning to the requisite analysis to justify the violation, Deschamps points to the "minimal impairment" expectation to be that of the most interest. Expert and witness testimony was examined, which she found to be not particularly credible or useful. She then examines other provinces' health legislation, finding the lack of prohibitory legislation allows her to conclude that the Quebec Acts are not necessary to preserve the public health plan. Studies on public health programs in other countries examined by Deschamps support this claim.

The issue of deference to government is considered. "When the courts are given the tools they need to make a decision, they should not hesitate to assume their responsibilities," she states, claiming that social policies developed by the government should not be shied away from by the courts. Deference should be given only with a justification consistent with democratic values and sufficiently necessary to maintain public order.

In concluding, Deschamp points her finger squarely at the government and suggests the need for change:

For many years, the government has failed to act; the situation continues to deteriorate. This is not a case in which missing scientific data would allow for a more informed decision to be made. The principle of prudence that is so popular in matters relating to the environment and to medical research cannot be transposed to this case. Under the Quebec plan, the government can control its human resources in various ways, whether by using the time of professionals who have already reached the maximum for payment by the state, by applying the provision that authorizes it to compel even nonparticipating physicians to provide services (s. 30 HEIA) or by implementing less restrictive measures, like those adopted in the four Canadian provinces that do not prohibit private insurance or in the other OECD countries. While the government has the power to decide what measures to adopt, it cannot choose to do nothing in the face of the violation of Quebecers' right to security. The government has not given reasons for its failure to act. Inertia cannot be used as an argument to justify deference.

=== McLachlin and Major ===
Both McLachlin and Major agree with Deschamp's reasoning but rely more on section 7 and section 1 of the Canadian Charter to reach the same outcome. They observe that the "Charter does not confer a freestanding constitutional right to health care. However, where the government puts in place a scheme to provide health care, that scheme must comply with the Charter."

To determine a violation of the Charter, they look at how the Quebec Acts differ from the Canada Health Act'. They note that unlike with other legislation, the impugned Acts remove the ability to contract for private health care insurance and in effect create a virtual monopoly for the public health system. On the evidence of significant delays in service, this monopoly harms the right to security of person. Delays in medical treatment could have physical and stressful consequences.

In reviewing the public health care systems of several countries they find that the connection was missing. In defence of this, they criticize the dissenters' rejection of international data as well and reliance on what they characterized as inconsistent reports from Romanow and Senator Kirby.

=== Binnie and LeBel ===
They begin by phrasing the question as being not one of rationing, but rather

whether the province of Quebec not only has the constitutional authority to establish a comprehensive single-tier health plan, but to discourage a second (private) tier health sector by prohibiting the purchase and sale of private health insurance.

They then describe the problem as an issue of public policy and social values which is not for the courts to decide.

In our view, the appellants' case does not rest on constitutional law but on their disagreement with the Quebec government on aspects of its social policy. The proper forum to determine the social policy of Quebec in this matter is the National Assembly.

The characterization of the problem by the majority contains too much ambiguity, they claim. How can the court determine what is a "reasonable" wait time, they ask?

Binnie and LeBel primarily take issue with the majority's claim that the law is arbitrary contrary to the principles of fundamental justice.

appellants' argument about "arbitrariness" is based largely on generalizations about the public system drawn from fragmentary experience, an overly optimistic view of the benefits offered by private health insurance, an oversimplified view of the adverse effects on the public health system of permitting private sector health services to flourish and an overly interventionist view of the role the courts should play in trying to supply a "fix" to the failings, real or perceived, of major social programs.

The dissenters' interpretation of the legislation finds a rational connection to the objectives of the Canadian Health Act:

Not all Canadian provinces prohibit private health insurance, but all of them take steps to protect the public health system by discouraging the private sector... the mixture of deterrents differs from province to province, but the underlying policies flow from the Canada Health Act and are the same: i.e. as a matter of principle, health care should be based on need, not wealth, and as a matter of practicality the provinces judge that growth of the private sector will undermine the strength of the Canada Health Act.

They admit agreeing with the majority and the trial judge that the law will put some Quebecers life and "security of person" at risk, but they do not see the matter being resolved by or applicable to the constitution. They state that "it will likely be a rare case where s. 7 will apply in circumstances entirely unrelated to adjudicative or administrative proceedings." However, they claim, this is not one of those times. Instead, they lament the overextension of the constitution:

The Court has been moving away from a narrow approach to s. 7, which restricted the scope of the section to legal rights to be interpreted in light of the rights enumerated in ss. 8-14.

In effect, the dissenters say, the court is only protecting the right to contract and pushing Canada into its own Lochner era, while dismissing those that claimed privatizing will not necessarily solve the problem.

They characterize the majority's use of the word "arbitrary" as meaning "unnecessary," claiming that if that were true, it would require the courts to interfere too much with lawmakers.

The dissenters' final objection is the majority's expansion of the reasoning in R. v. Morgentaler. Binnie and LeBel distinguish R. v. Morgentaler from the current case, as the former was about "manifest unfairness" and criminal liability, not arbitrariness and public health policy, which, they claim, requires a very different analytical approach.

== Aftermath ==
The decision proved to be highly contentious by its political nature and its conflict with the present government's policy on health. There are those, who argue that this decision could potentially lead to the dismantling of the Canadian Medicare system, while others suggest that this could be a much-needed wake-up call to repair the ailing system.

This ruling could have a direct effect on most provinces that currently have laws that are designed to discourage the private sector, in particular Ontario, Manitoba, British Columbia, Alberta, and Prince Edward Island, which all have legislation very similar to the impugned laws in Quebec.

After the Supreme Court rendered its judgment, the Attorney General of Quebec asked the court to stay (suspend) its judgment for 18 months. The court granted the stay for only 12 months; it therefore expired on June 8, 2006.

In August 2005, delegates to the Canadian Medical Association adopted a motion supporting access to private-sector health services and private medical insurance in circumstances where patients cannot obtain timely access to care through the single-payer health care system.

In November 2005, a Quebec provincial white paper on limited private reforms was leaked to the media. The paper proposed allowing the purchase of private medical insurance. To prevent doctors from abandoning the public system, the paper would force doctors to perform a minimum amount of work in the public sector before they would be allowed to perform in the private sector.

== See also ==
- Healthcare in Canada
- List of Supreme Court of Canada cases (McLachlin Court)
- fr:Jacques Chaoulli (in French)
- Shona Holmes health care incident
