= Section 7 of the Canadian Charter of Rights and Freedoms =

Constitutional provision concerning right to life, liberty and security of the person

Section 7 of the Canadian Charter of Rights and Freedoms is a constitutional provision that protects an individual's autonomy and personal legal rights from actions of the government in Canada. There are three types of protection within the section: the right to life, liberty and security of the person. Denials of these rights are constitutional only if the denials do not breach what is referred to as fundamental justice.

This Charter provision provides both substantive and procedural rights. It has broad application beyond merely protecting due process in administrative proceedings and in the adjudicative context, and has in certain circumstances touched upon major national policy issues such as entitlement to social assistance and public health care. As such, it has proven to be a controversial provision in the Charter.

== Text ==
Under the heading of "Legal Rights", the section states:

7. Everyone has the right to life, liberty and security of the person and the right not to be deprived thereof except in accordance with the principles of fundamental justice.

== Application ==
The wording of section 7 says that it applies to "everyone". This includes all people within Canada, including non-citizens. It does not, however, apply to corporations.

Section 7 rights can also be violated by the conduct of a party other than a Canadian government body. The government need only be a participant or complicit in the conduct threatening the right, where the violation must be a reasonably foreseeable consequence of the government actions.

Section 7 has not been interpreted to convey positive rights nor has it been interpreted to impose any positive obligations upon the government. However, the Supreme Court of Canada has not ruled out these alternatives.

== Life ==
First, there is the right to life, which stands generally as the basic right to be alive. Life has been thoroughly discussed by the Supreme Court in the 1993 case Rodriguez v British Columbia (AG). In that case, the Court denied that the section 7 right to bodily control could trump the right to life and thereby justify assisted suicide. As the Court wrote, it was a common societal belief that "human life is sacred or inviolable", and therefore security of the person itself could not include a right to suicide; suicide would destroy life and thus be inherently harmful.

However, the Supreme Court under Chief Justice Beverley McLachlin has unanimously reversed this decision in Carter v Canada (AG). The Criminal Code provision imposing a blanket ban on assisted suicide was struck down for overbreadth, as it also impacted those with the capacity to provide legitimate consent. Bill C-14 was passed in June 2016 in response to this decision.

== Liberty ==
Secondly, there is the right to liberty, which protects an individual's freedom to act without physical restraint (i.e., imprisonment would be inconsistent with liberty unless it is consistent with fundamental justice). However, the right has been extended to include the power to make important personal choices. The court described it as "[touching] the core of what it means to be an autonomous human being blessed with dignity and independence in matters that can be characterized as fundamentally or inherently personal". (R v Clay, 2003) That is, the concept extends beyond physical restraint by the government as it goes to the core of the human experience.

The right to choice is probably an individual right only, as opposed to also being a family right or a union right, however the rights are between you and the government and not between you and a member of your family. In the 1995 Supreme Court decision B (R) v Children's Aid Society, in which two parents attempted to block a certain treatment for their child on religious grounds, it was argued that the personal choice aspect of liberty guaranteed family privacy. This argument drew from American case law, but the Supreme Court pointed out section 7 of the Charter contains individual rights, and hence there cannot be family rights. Still, mindful that there was still choices involved in the family situation, the Supreme Court split on whether liberty rights were infringed. Likewise, in I.L.W.U. v. The Queen (1992), the Supreme Court stressed the individual nature of section 7 to deny unions had a right to strike as part of the members' liberty. The Court also stressed that strikes were socioeconomic matters that did not involve the justice system, and section 7 was concentrated on the justice system.

Various liberties not covered by the section 7 right to liberty include religious liberty and liberty of speech, because these are more specifically guaranteed under section 2, the liberty to vote, as this is more specifically guaranteed by section 3, and the liberty to move within, leave and enter Canada, as this is more specifically guaranteed by section 6.

== Security of the person ==
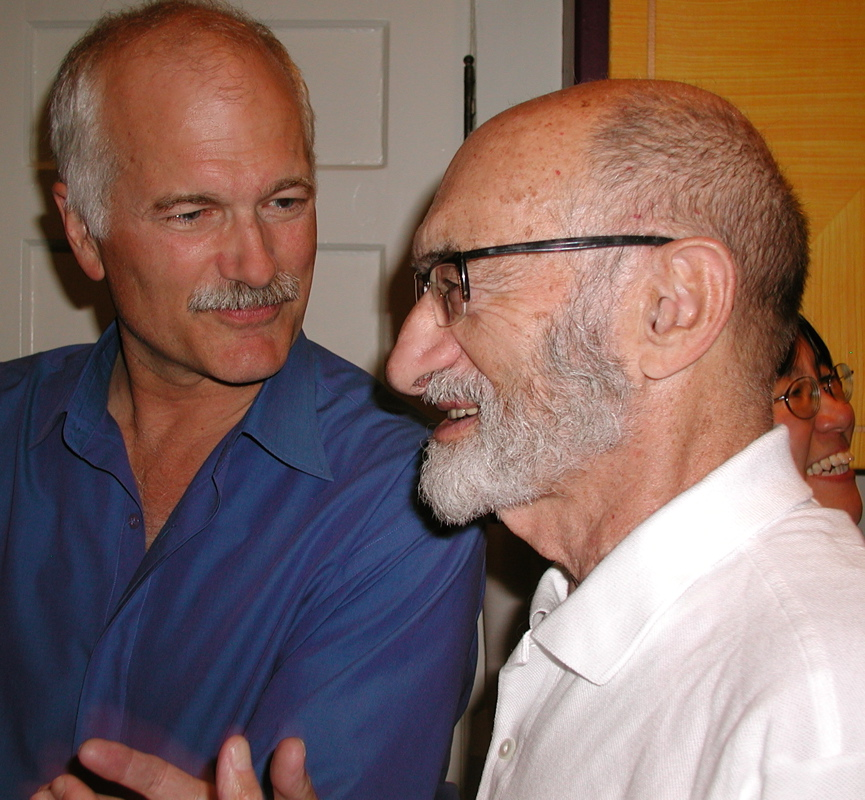
Henry Morgentaler, right, successfully challenged abortion law as a breach of security of person in R v Morgentaler (1988).

Third, there is the right to security of the person, which consists of rights to privacy of the body and its health and of the right protecting the "psychological integrity" of an individual. That is, the right protects against significant government-inflicted harm (stress) to the mental state of the individual. (Blencoe v British Columbia (Human Rights Commission), 2000)

This right has generated significant case law, as abortion in Canada was legalized in R v Morgentaler (1988) after the Supreme Court found the Therapeutic Abortion Committees breached women's security of person by threatening their health. Some judges also felt control of the body was a right within security of the person, breached by the abortion law. However, in R v Levkovic, 2013 SCC 25, the Supreme Court found that "security of the person" could not be used to justify a mother's failure to report a stillbirth.

In Operation Dismantle v The Queen (1985), cruise missile testing was unsuccessfully challenged as violating security of the person for risking nuclear war.

In Chaoulli v Quebec (AG) (2005), the majority of Supreme Court justices declared Quebec's ban on private health care to breach security of the person, since delays in medical treatment can result in serious physical pain, or even death.

Some people feel economic rights ought to be read into security of the person, as well as section 15 equality rights to make the Charter similar to the International Covenant on Economic, Social and Cultural Rights. The rationale is that economic rights can relate to a decent standard of living and can help the civil rights flourish in a liveable environment. There has also been discussion within the Supreme Court and among academics as to whether security of the person guarantees some economic rights.

While some people feel economic rights ought to be included, jurisprudence in this area appears not to support this view. In 2003, the Supreme Court ruled that, "The ability to generate business revenue by one's chosen means is not a right that is protected under s. 7 of the Charter." In 2004, Blair JA, writing for the Court of Appeal for Ontario in Mussani v College of Physicians and Surgeons of Ontario noted that "the weight of authority is that there is no constitutional right to practise a profession unfettered by the applicable rules which and standards which regulate that profession", before going on to conclude that the revocation of Mr. Mussani's licence to practice medicine did not deprive him of life, liberty or the security of his person. The courts have also held that "salary or compensation (in whatever form they may take), are in my view a purely economic right, and are not protected by section 7".

Theoretically, security of the person would be breached if the government limits a person's ability to make an income, by denying welfare, taking away property essential to one's profession, or denying licenses. However, section 7 is primarily concerned with legal rights, so this reading of economic rights is questionable. Many economic issues could also be political questions.

== Principles of fundamental justice ==
All three rights may be compromised in the cases where the infringing law is in "accordance with the principles of fundamental justice". That is, there are core values within the justice system that must prevail over these rights for the greater good of society. These include natural justice and since the 1985 Supreme Court decision Re BC Motor Vehicle Act they also include substantive guarantees, including rights guaranteed by the other legal rights in the Charter (i.e., rights against unreasonable search and seizure, guaranteed under section 8, and against cruel and unusual punishments, under section 12, are part of fundamental justice under section 7 as well). Other "Principles" are determined by the court and form the basis of the Canadian legal system.

it must be a legal principle about which there is sufficient societal consensus that it is fundamental to the way in which the legal system should fairly operate, and it must be identified with sufficient precision to yield a manageable standard against which to measure deprivations of life, liberty, or security of the person. (R v Malmo-Levine, 2003)

The following are some of the well established Principles of Fundamental Justice.

=== Established principles ===
==== Arbitrariness ====
It is a principle of fundamental justice that laws should not be arbitrary. (R v Malmo-Levine) That is, the state may not limit an individual's rights where "it bears no relation to, or is inconsistent with, the objective that lies behind [it]". (Rodriguez v British Columbia (AG))

==== Vagueness ====
The "Principles of Fundamental Justice" require laws to have a clear and understandable interpretation so as to properly define the rule or offence.

A law is unconstitutionally vague if it does not have clarity enough to create "legal debate". There must be clarity of purpose, subject matter, nature, prior judicial interpretation, societal values, and related provisions. This does not prevent the use of broadly defined terms so long as societal objectives can be gleaned from it. (Ontario v Canadian Pacific Ltd, 1995) In R v Nova Scotia Pharmaceutical Society, for example, a statute which made it illegal to "unduly" prevent or lessen competition was upheld. Although the wording was undeniably open-ended and uncertain, the concept of undue interference with competition was deemed sufficient to enable legal debate on the subject.

==== Overbreadth ====
The "Principles of Fundamental Justice" require that means used to achieve a societal purpose or objective must be reasonably necessary.

"Overbreadth analysis looks at the means chosen by the state in relation to its purpose. If the State, in pursuing a legitimate objective, uses means which are broader than is necessary to accomplish that objective, the principles of fundamental justice will be violated because the individual's rights will have been limited for no reason." (R v Heywood at para 49)

==== Gross disproportionality ====
Gross disproportionality describes state actions or legislative responses to a problem that are so extreme as to be disproportionate to any legitimate government interest (R v Malmo-Levine at para 143)

==== Requirement of mens rea ====
The principles of fundamental justice require that criminal offences that have sentences involving prison must have a mens rea element, namely intent to commit a crime. (Re BC Motor Vehicle Act, R v Vaillancourt) For more serious crimes such as murder that impose a stigma as part of the conviction, the mental element must be proven on a "subjective" level. (R v Martineau)

Where an individual is criminally charged under an exceptionally complex or difficult to understand statute (such as the Income Tax Act), a mistaken interpretation of the law may serve to negate the requisite mens rea.

==== Shocks the conscience ====
In Canada v Schmidt (1987), the Supreme Court found that government decisions to extradite people are bound by section 7. Moreover, it is possible that a potential punishment in the receiving country "shocks the conscience" to the extent that the Canadian government would breach fundamental justice if they extradited people there, and thus put them at risk of something shocking. In determining what would shock the conscience, the Court said some elements of fundamental justice in Canada, such as the presumption of innocence, could be seen as "finicky" and thus irrelevant to extradition. In contrast, the possibility of torture would be shocking.

==== Right to make full answer and defence ====
Anyone accused of a criminal charge has the right to know the case against them and put forward a defence. In addition to being a principle of fundamental justice, this right is also protected by the right to a fair trial under section 11(d) of the Charter.

"Full answer and defence" encompasses a number of things, including the right to counsel (also see section 10), the right to examine witnesses, and most importantly, the right to full disclosure by the Crown (see R v Stinchcombe, 1991).

==== Right to silence ====
In R v Hebert the court held that the right to silence was a principle of fundamental justice. Statements of the accused may not be achieved through police trickery and silence may not be used to make any inference of guilt.

==== Moral culpability for youths ====
In R v DB, the Court held that "young people are entitled to a presumption of diminished moral culpability", and so the Youth Criminal Justice Act may not create a presumption of an adult sentence upon youths.

==== Court-appointed Counsel ====
In R v Rowbotham, 1988 CanLII 147 (ON CA), the Ontario Court of Appeal found that section 7 requires the appointment of counsel for an accused facing a serious criminal charge who is not capable of representing himself and not financially able to retain counsel.

==== Moral involuntariness ====
In R v Ruzic, the Court held that as a principle of fundamental justice, a person may not be found guilty of a criminal offence where the person faces "perilous circumstances" and is "deprived of a realistic choice whether to break the law." The Court affirmed moral involuntariness as a principle of fundamental justice in R v Ryan.

==== Lawyers' duty to clients ====
In Canada (Attorney General) v. Federation of Law Societies of Canada, it was held as a principle of fundamental justice that the state cannot impose obligations on lawyers that undermine their duty of commitment to clients. The case arose in the content of federal money laundering legislation which required lawyers to retain information on certain financial transactions. Even though solicitor-client privilege could be declared, the Court held that the law nonetheless undermined the public's confidence in lawyers' duty of commitment by requiring them to collect and retain significantly more information than what is needed for ethical and effective client representation.

=== Rejected principles ===
Throughout the development of fundamental justice, petitioners have suggested many principles that the Courts have rejected for not being sufficiently fundamental to justice.

In R v Malmo-Levine, the Supreme Court rejected the claim that an element of "harm" was a required component of all criminal offences.

In R v DeSousa, the Court had rejected the claim that there must be symmetry between all actus reus and mens rea elements.

In Canadian Foundation for Children, Youth and the Law v Canada (AG), the Court rejected the claim that laws affecting children must be in their best interests.

In R v Safarzadeh‑Markhali, the Court held that proportionality – the principle that a sentence must be consistent with the gravity of the offence and the degree of responsibility of the offender – was not a fundamental principle of justice, despite being a foundational principle of sentencing under the Criminal Code. The Court held that while parliament could not require courts to impose grossly disproportionate punishment (as that constitutes cruel and unusual punishment, prohibited by section 12), it could otherwise derogate from proportionality as it wished since the principle did not have freestanding constitutional status.

== Comparison with other human rights instruments ==
The United States Bill of Rights also contains rights to life and liberty under the Fifth Amendment and the United States Constitution guarantees those rights again under the Fourteenth Amendment. In Canada before the Charter, the Canadian Bill of Rights contained rights to life, liberty and security of the person, but all these other laws limit those rights through due process rather than fundamental justice. Fundamental justice is read more substantively.

Another key difference is that the Fifth and Fourteenth US Amendments add the right to property, and the Canadian Bill adds the right to "enjoyment of property." The fact that section 7 excludes a right contained in its sister laws is taken as significant, and thus rights to property are not even read into the rights to liberty and security of the person.

There have been calls for section 7 to protect property. In 1981 the Progressive Conservative Party suggested that section 7 be extended to protect the "enjoyment of property." Some provincial governments, including that of Prince Edward Island, as well as the New Democratic Party, opposed the change. The NDP thought that if property rights were enshrined in the Charter, other economic rights should be added. In September 1982, after the Charter had been enacted, the government of British Columbia approved of an unsuccessful amendment to section 7 that would protect property rights. See Unsuccessful attempts to amend the Canadian Constitution for more information.
