= R v Ryan =

- Supreme Court of Canada

Hearing: June 14, 2012 Judgment: January 18, 2013
- Full case name: Nicole Doucet Ryan v. Her Majesty The Queen
- Citations: 2013 SCC 3

Court membership
- Chief Justice: Beverly McLachlin C.J.
- Puisne Justices: LeBel, Deschamps, Fish, Abella, Rothstein, Cromwell, Moldaver and Karakatsanis JJ. (*) hearing only, (+) rehearing only

Reasons given
- Majority: LeBel and Cromwell JJ. (McLachlin C.J. and Deschamps, Abella, Rothstein, Moldaver and Karakatsanis JJ. concurring).

R v Ryan [2013] SCC 3 is a case concerning the availability of duress in the context of domestic violence.

== Background ==
Nicole Doucet Ryan (now Nicole Doucet) alleged that she was subject to repeated abuse and torment by her husband, Michael Ryan. At trial, the trial judge accepted she was subject to such abuse. The husband was never called to testify. In September 2007, Ms. Doucet began to think about having her husband murdered. Over the course of the next seven months, she spoke to at least three men whom she hoped would kill him. In December 2007 or January 2008, she paid one man $25,000 to carry out the killing, but he then refused, demanding more compensation. She approached another person and was contacted by a third, an undercover RCMP officer, posing as a “hit man”. On March 27, 2008, she met with this individual and agreed to pay him to kill her husband. The agreed upon price was $25,000, with $2,000 paid in cash that day. The killing was to take place the coming weekend. Later that same night, she provided an address and a picture of her husband to the “hit man.” Shortly after, she was arrested and charged with counselling the commission of an offence not committed contrary to s. 464(a) of the Criminal Code, R.S.C. 1985, c. C-46.

At trial, there was no issue that the elements of the offence had been proved and the trial judge, Farrar J. (as he then was), indicated that he was satisfied beyond a reasonable doubt that the requisite elements of the offence of counselling the commission of an offence had been established. He based this conclusion on the Ms. Doucet’s admission that the Crown had proved a prima facie case and on the audio and video tapes of recorded conversations with the undercover officer and a statement made on arrest. The only issue at trial was whether Ms. Doucet’s otherwise criminal acts were excused because of duress. The accused had raised that the common law defence of duress applied. The Crown argued that on the facts of this case, the components of duress were not present. But it did not argue at trial, as it did later on appeal, that the defence of duress was not available in law to the accused. The trial judge accepted her version and acquitted her on the basis she had established she was acting under duress.

The Nova Scotia Court of Appeal unanimously upheld her acquittal.

== Reasons of the court ==
The Court allowed the Crown appeal. The majority entered a stay while the dissenting judge, Fish J., would have ordered a new trial, leaving it to the Crown to determine whether a retrial was in the public interest.

The Court accepted the facts found by the trial judge. The only issue was whether the defence of duress was available. The Court accepted the Crown’s argument, which was made for the first time, that duress was not available. Duress is available when one is compelled to commit a crime against an innocent third party. In this case, given the facts found by the trial judge, the husband would not be an innocent victim. Rather he would be the author of his own misfortune. Moreover, Ms. Doucet was never compelled to act as she did. The Court alluded to the possibility of invoking self-defence as a possible defence.

Fish J. found the granting of the stay of proceedings was inappropriate. He would have ordered a new trial. Any further defence advanced by the accused could be made then.

While not being available on the fact, the SCC's wider discussion of the law of duress in Canada is instructive. Duress is an excuse based defence which operates to negate criminal liability where the offence is the product of an accused’s morally involuntary conduct. There is both a statutory and common law defence of duress. Whereas the statutory defence will be available to a principal offender, the common law defence will be available to secondary offenders. A notable difference between the two defences is that whereas the common law defence of duress will be available to any charge, the statutory defence, as described in section 17 of the Criminal Code, contains a list of excluded offences, including murder.

Apart from this, the decision in Ryan brought the statutory and common law versions of the defence of duress into relative harmony. For one, There must have been an implicit or explicit threat of present or future death or bodily harm against accused or a third party that the accused reasonably believed would be carried out. Second, there must have been no safe avenue of escape available to the accused. Third, there must have been a close temporal link between the threat and the offence. Fourth, there must have been proportionality between the threat of harm and the offence carried out. Relatedly, the accused must have acted with reasonable fortitude in response to the threat. Fifth, and finally, the accused must not have been a part of a conspiracy while participating in the offence.

== Reactions ==
Following the release of the decision on January 18, 2013, Michael Ryan, ex-husband of the accused denied any of the allegations made. He emphasized he was in attendance at court in response to a subpoena, but the Crown never called him as a witness.

A law professor from Dalhousie University called for a public inquiry. He questioned the rationale of the Crown not to call Mr. Ryan as a witness. He also was critical of the Court in making findings against the RCMP without having heard anything from the RCMP. He was also critical of the granting of a stay of proceedings, agreeing with Fish J. that it is an extreme remedy.

== See also ==
- List of Supreme Court of Canada cases (McLachlin Court)
- Battered woman syndrome
