= Little Sisters Book and Art Emporium v Canada =

2000 Supreme Court of Canada case

Little Sisters Book and Art Emporium v Canada (Minister of Justice)
- Supreme Court of Canada

Hearing: March 16, 2000 Judgment: December 15, 2000
- Full case name: Little Sisters Book and Art Emporium, B.C. Civil Liberties Association, James Eaton Deva and Guy Allen Bruce Smythe v The Minister of Justice and Attorney General of Canada, the Minister of National Revenue and the Attorney General of British Columbia
- Citations: [2000] 2 S.C.R. 1120, 2000 SCC 69 (CanLII); Parallel citations: (2000), 193 D.L.R. (4th) 193; (2000), [2001] 2 W.W.R. 1; (2000), 150 C.C.C. (3d) 1; (2000), 28 Admin. L.R. (3d) 1; (2000), 28 Admin. L.R. (3e) 1; (2000), 38 C.R. (5th) 209; (2000), 79 C.R.R. (2d) 189; (2000), 83 B.C.L.R. (3d) 1
- Prior history: Judgment for the Minister of Justice at the British Columbia Court of Appeal

Court membership
- Chief Justice: Beverley McLachlin; Puisne Justices: Claire L'Heureux-Dubé, Charles Gonthier, Frank Iacobucci, John C. Major, Michel Bastarache, Ian Binnie, Louise Arbour, Louis LeBel

Reasons given
- Majority: Binnie J. (paras. 1-161), joined by McLachlin C.J. and L'Heureux-Dubé, Gonthier, Major, and Bastarache JJ.
- Concur/dissent: Iacobucci J. (paras. 162-283), joined by Arbour and LeBel J.

Little Sisters Book and Art Emporium v Canada (Minister of Justice) [2000] 2 S.C.R. 1120, 2000 SCC 69 is a leading Supreme Court of Canada decision on freedom of expression and equality rights under the Canadian Charter of Rights and Freedoms. It was held that the Customs Act, which gave broad powers to customs inspectors to exclude "obscene" materials, violated the right to freedom of expression under section 2 but was justifiable under section 1; however the Customs Act must be read to place the onus of proving obscenity on the state, not the importer.

== Background ==
Little Sister's Book and Art Emporium is a bookstore in Vancouver, British Columbia, that sells gay and lesbian-related literature. It imports most of its material from the United States, which often caused trouble at the border when material was classified as obscene by Canada Customs and was thus refused entry. The bookstore challenged the provision of the Customs Act prohibiting the importation of obscene material as well as a section of the Act that put the onus on the importer to disprove obscenity.

== The courts below ==
At trial, the court found that Canada Customs had targeted shipments to the bookstore and attempted to prevent their entry into Canada. Consequently, the government was found to have violated section 2 of the Charter. However, the violation was justified under section 1.

== Judgment of the Supreme Court ==
In a 6–3 decision, the Supreme Court upheld the ruling of the trial judge and found that though the law violated section 2, it was justified under section 1. The law was thus saved. However, they found that the way the law was implemented by customs officials was discriminatory and should be remedied, an opinion they suggested would avail the bookstore in any further legal battles. They also struck down part of the law that put the onus on an importer to prove material was not obscene. The ruling, therefore, upheld Canada Customs' right to prevent the importation of material that had already been banned as obscene by the courts, but curtailed the agency's right to preemptively or punitively detain material that had not been so adjudicated.

Interveners that supported the bookstore's position in the Supreme Court included the Women's Legal Education and Action Fund.

== See also ==
- List of Supreme Court of Canada cases (McLachlin Court)
- Censorship in Canada
