= 1989 judgments of the Supreme Court of Canada =

Supreme Court of Canada Cour suprême du Canada
- Established: April 8, 1875
- Jurisdiction: General court of appeal for Canada
- Motto: Justitia et Veritas
- Authorized by: Supreme Court Act, RSC 1985, c. S-26
- Appeals from: Provincial and federal courts of appeal
- Judge term length: Retirement at age 75
- Number of positions: Nine
- Language: English and French
- Website: Supreme Court of Canada

The tables below list the judgments delivered by the Supreme Court of Canada during 1989. The judgments are listed in the order of publication in the Supreme Court Reports, starting with the first judgments of the year, rendered on January 19, 1989, and ending with the last judgments, rendered on December 21, 1989. The tables give a general illustration of the positions taken by each justice in each case, and how justices concurred or dissented with the decisions of the majority.

The Supreme Court normally reserves its judgment after hearing argument on an appeal, and then gives its judgment at some later date. At the time of these judgments, the court would deliver its reserved decisions at a session in open court. In some cases, the court instead gives its judgment from the bench at the conclusion of the hearing, with a short outline of its reasons. Those judgments are included in the table. The court also could give its decision on an appeal from the bench at the conclusion of the hearing, reasons to follow at a later date.

This table includes cases which were argued in a previous year and reserved, with the judgment given in 1989. Cases which were heard in 1989 and reserved, with judgment in a later year, are included in the article for the later year.

The Court gave 133 judgments in 1989, reported in two volumes of the Supreme Court Reports.

There were several changes in the membership of the court in 1989:

- Charles Gonthier, a judge of the Quebec Court of Appeal, was appointed on February 1, 1989, succeeding Justice Beetz who had retired on November 9, 1988;
- Peter Cory, a judge of the Ontario Court of Appeal, was appointed on February 1, 1989, succeeding Justice Le Dain who had retired on November 29, 1988;
- Justice McIntyre retired on February 15, 1989, after ten years on the court;
- Beverley McLachlin, chief justice of the Supreme Court of British Columbia, was appointed on March 30, 1989, succeeding Justice McIntyre.

The Supreme Court Act authorises a retired judge to participate in reserved appeals they have heard prior to their retirement, for up to six months. Justices Le Dain and Estey (who also retired in 1988) did not participate in any decisions after their retirement; Justices Beetz and McIntyre did so.

== Judgments ==
=== Supreme Court Reports 1989: volume 1 ===
By the Court (C)
Unanimous reasons for judgment (U)
Concurred in the unanimous reasons (C–U)
Majority reasons for judgment (M)
Concurred in the majority (C–M)
Concurring reasons (C–R)
Concurred in the concurring reasons (C–C)
Plurality reasons (P)
Concurred in the plurality reasons (C–P)
Dissenting reasons (D)
Concurred in the dissent (C–D)
Dissenting in part (D–P)
Concurred in the partial dissent (C–DP)
Seriatim reasons (S)
Concurred in seriatim reasons (C–S)
Motion (Mo)
Did not sit on the appeal (NS)
Did not participate in the judgment (NP)
Not a Justice of the Court at the time of hearing or judgment (NJ)
- "Decision by the Court" means that it is a unanimous judgment of the Court, not attributed to any particular justice.
- "Unanimous reasons for judgment" indicated a unanimous decision, written by a particular justice.
- Multiple concurrences and dissents within a case are numbered, with concurrences by other numbered accordingly. Justices occasionally concur in multiple reasons in a single case; each concurrence is subdivided accordingly.
- Reasons are sometimes drafted jointly by two or more justices.
- Decisions that are given orally from the bench are denoted by "Bench" on the justice who gave the oral decision.

Case name	Argued	Decided	Dickson	Beetz (Note: Justice Beetz resigned on November 9, 1988. As permitted by the Supreme Court Act, he continued to participate in judgments on appeals he heard before his resignation.)	McIntyre (Note: Justice McIntyre resigned on February 15, 1989. As permitted by the Supreme Court Act, he continued to participate in judgments on appeals he heard before his resignation.)	Lamer	Wilson	La Forest	L'Heureux-Dubé	Sopinka	Gonthier (Note: Justice Gonthier was appointed on February 1, 1989, succeeding Justice Beetz.)	Cory (Note: Justice Cory was appointed on February 1, 1989, succeeding Justice Le Dain.)	McLachlin (Note: Justice McLachlin was appointed on March 30, 1989, succeeding Justice McIntyre.)
R. v. Ross, [1989] 1 SCR 3 (Note: Justice Estey sat on the hearing, but resigned on April 22, 1988, and did not participate in the decision of any case after that date.)	Jan 27, 1988	Jan 19, 1989	NS	C–M	C–D	M	C–M	C–M	D	NS	NJ	NJ	NJ
R. v. Amway Corp., [1989] 1 SCR 21	Oct 5, 1988	Jan 19, 1989	C–U	NS	C–U	C–U	C–U	C–U	C–U	U	NJ	NJ	NJ
R. v. Hayes, [1989] 1 SCR 44	Oct 6, 1988	Jan 19, 1989	C–M	NS	C–D	C–D	C–M	C–M	M	D	NJ	NJ	NJ
R. v. Genest, [1989] 1 SCR 59 (Note: Justice Le Dain sat on the hearing, but resigned on November 29, 1988, and did not participate in the decision of any case after that date.)	Jan 29, 1988	Jan 26, 1989	U	C–U	C–U	C–U	C–U	C–U	C–U	NJ	NJ	NJ	NJ
R. v. Duguay, [1989] 1 SCR 93	Oct 14, 1988	Jan 26, 1989	M	NS	C–M	C–M	C–M	C–M	D	C–M	NJ	NJ	NJ
Granger v. Canada (C.E.I.C.), [1989] 1 SCR 141	Feb 1, 1989	Feb 1, 1989	NS	NJ	NS	Bench; U	C–U	C–U	C–U	C–U	NJ	NJ	NJ
Andrews v. Law Society of British Columbia, [1989] 1 SCR 143	Oct 5, 6, 1987	Feb 2, 1989	C–P	NS	D	C–D	P	C–R	C–P	NJ	NJ	NJ	NJ
Ontario (Attorney General) v. Pembina Exploration Canada Ltd., [1989] 1 SCR 206	Jun 12, 1987	Feb 23, 1989	C–U	NS	C–U	NS	NS	U	C–U	NJ	NJ	NJ	NJ
R. v. Roman, [1989] 1 SCR 230	Jan 31, 1989	Feb 23, 1989	C	NJ	C	C	C	C	C	C	NJ	NJ	NJ
R. v. Hébert, [1989] 1 SCR 233	Feb 2, 1989	Feb 23, 1989	NS	NJ	NS	C	C	C	C	C	NJ	NJ	NJ
Case name	Argued	Decided	Dickson	Beetz	McIntyre	Lamer	Wilson	La Forest	L'Heureux-Dubé	Sopinka	Gonthier	Cory	McLachlin
American Airlines Inc. v. Canada (Competition Tribunal), [1989] 1 SCR 236	Mar 1, 1989	Mar 1, 1989	Bench; U	NJ	NJ	Bench; U	C–U	C–U	C–U	C–U	NS	C–U	NJ
Sobeys Stores Ltd. v. Yeomans and Labour Standards Tribunal (N.S.), [1989] 1 SCR 238	Feb 5, 1988	Mar 2, 1989	C–M	C–C	C–M	C–M	M	C–R	C–C	NJ	NJ	NJ	NJ
B. (B.) v. Child and Family Services, [1989] 1 SCR 291	Mar 2, 1989	Mar 2, 1989	Bench; U	NJ	NJ	C–U	C–U	C–U	C–U	Bench; U	NS	C–U	NJ
Arthur D. Little Inc. v. Coopers & Lybrand, [1989] 1 SCR 293	Mar 2, 1989	Mar 2, 1989	NS	NJ	NJ	NS	Bench; U	C–U	C–U	C–U	NS	C–U	NJ
R. v. Gill, [1989] 1 SCR 295	Mar 3, 1989	Mar 3, 1989	NS	NJ	NJ	Bench; U	NS	C–U	C–U	C–U	NS	C–U	NJ
R. v. Olson, [1989] 1 SCR 296	Jan 24, 1989	Apr 13, 1989	C	NJ	C	NS	NS	C	C	C	NJ	NJ	NJ
Brosseau v. Alberta Securities Commission, [1989] 1 SCR 301	Mar 28, 1988	Mar 9, 1989	C–U	NS	NS	C–U	C–U	C–U	U	NJ	NJ	NJ	NJ
Roberts v. Canada, [1989] 1 SCR 322	Jun 13, 1988	Mar 9, 1989	C–U	C–U	NS	C–U	U	NS	NS	NS	NJ	NJ	NJ
Borowski v. Canada (Attorney General), [1989] 1 SCR 342	Oct 3, 4, 1988	Mar 9, 1989	C–U	NS	C–U	C–U	C–U	C–U	C–U	U	NJ	NJ	NJ
R. v. Chaulk (Application), [1989] 1 SCR 369	Mar 13, 1989	Apr 27, 1989	C	NJ	NJ	C	C	C	C	C	NS	C	NJ
Case name	Argued	Decided	Dickson	Beetz	McIntyre	Lamer	Wilson	La Forest	L'Heureux-Dubé	Sopinka	Gonthier	Cory	McLachlin
Greater Montreal Protestant School Board v. Quebec (Attorney General), [1989] 1 SCR 377	Jun 7, 1988	Mar 16, 1988	C–C	M	C–M	C–M	C–R	C–M	NS	NS	NJ	NJ	NJ
Quebec (Attorney General) v. Belmoral Mines Ltée, [1989] 1 SCR 422	Mar 16, 1989	Mar 16, 1989	NS	NJ	NJ	Bench; U	NS	NS	C–U	Bench; U	C–U	C–U	NJ
R. v. Elias, [1989] 1 SCR 423	Mar 17, 1989	Mar 17, 1989	NS	NJ	NJ	Bench; U	NS	C–U	C–U	NS	C–U	C–U	NJ
R. v. Bayard, [1989] 1 SCR 425	Mar 22, 1989	Mar 22, 1989	NS	NJ	NJ	NS	Bench; U	C–U	NS	C–U	C–U	C–U	NJ
Hunter Engineering Co. v. Syncrude Canada Ltd., [1989] 1 SCR 426	Feb 25, 26, 1988	Mar 23, 1989	P	NS	C–R	NS	D–P	C–P	C–DP	NJ	NJ	NJ	NJ
R. v. Potvin, [1989] 1 SCR 525	Oct 6, 1988	Mar 23, 1989	C–C	NS	NS	C–M	M	C–R	NS	C–M	NJ	NJ	NJ
Prassad v. Canada (Minister of Employment and Immigration), [1989] 1 SCR 560	Nov 28, 1988	Mar 23, 1989	C–M	NJ	C–M	C–M	C–D	C–M	D	M	NJ	NJ	NJ
Black v. Law Society of Alberta, [1989] 1 SCR 591	Mar 22, 23, 1988	Apr 20, 1989	C–M	NS	D–P	NS	C–M	M	C–DP	NJ	NJ	NJ	NJ
General Motors of Canada Ltd. v. City National Leasing, [1989] 1 SCR 641	May 17, 18, 1988	Apr 20, 1989	U	C–U	C–U	C–U	NS	C–U	C–U	NJ	NJ	NJ	NJ
Québec Ready Mix Inc. v. Rocois Construction Inc., [1989] 1 SCR 695	May 17, 18, 1988	Apr 20, 1989	U	C–U	C–U	C–U	NS	C–U	C–U	NJ	NJ	NJ	NJ
Case name	Argued	Decided	Dickson	Beetz	McIntyre	Lamer	Wilson	La Forest	L'Heureux-Dubé	Sopinka	Gonthier	Cory	McLachlin
Laurentide Motels Ltd. v. Beauport (City), [1989] 1 SCR 705	May 24, 1988	Apr 20, 1989	NS	M	C–M	C–M	C–M	C–M	C–R	NS	NJ	NJ	NJ
Veilleux v. Quebec (Commission de protection du territoire agricole), [1989] 1 SCR 839	May 13, 1987	Apr 20, 1989	NS	U	NS	C–U	C–U	C–U	NS	NJ	NJ	NJ	NJ
Gauthier v. Quebec (Commission de protection du territoire agricole), [1989] 1 SCR 859	May 11, 1987	Apr 20, 1989	NS	U	NS	C–U	C–U	C–U	NS	NJ	NJ	NJ	NJ
Venne v. Quebec (Commission de la protection du territoire agricole), [1989] 1 SCR 880	May 11, 12, 1987	Apr 20, 1989	NS	U	NS	C–U	C–U	C–U	NS	NJ	NJ	NJ	NJ
Lebel v. Winzen Land Corp., [1989] 1 SCR 918	May 12, 1987	Apr 20, 1989	NS	U	NS	C–U	C–U	C–U	NS	NJ	NJ	NJ	NJ
Reference Re Workers' Compensation Act, 1983 (Nfld.), [1989] 1 SCR 922	Apr 24, 1989	Apr 24, 1989	Bench; U	NJ	NJ	C–U	C–U	Bench; U	C–U	NS	C–U	C–U	NS
Irwin Toy Ltd. v. Quebec (Attorney General), [1989] 1 SCR 927	Nov 19, 20, 1987	Apr 27, 1989	M	D–P	C–DP	C–M	C–M	NS	NS	NJ	NJ	NJ	NJ
Cohnstaedt v. University of Regina, [1989] 1 SCR 1011	Jan 30, 1989	Apr 27, 1989	C–U	NJ	NJ	NS	C–U	C–U	U	C–U	NJ	NJ	NJ
Maurice v. Priel, [1989] 1 SCR 1023	Feb 3, 1989	Apr 27, 1989	NS	NJ	NJ	C–M	C–M	C–R	C–M	C–M	C–M	M	NJ
R. v. Mcginn, [1989] 1 SCR 1035	Apr 26, 1989	Apr 26, 1989	NS	NJ	NJ	Bench; U	C–U	C–U	NS	C–U	NS	C–U	NS
Case name	Argued	Decided	Dickson	Beetz	McIntyre	Lamer	Wilson	La Forest	L'Heureux-Dubé	Sopinka	Gonthier	Cory	McLachlin
R. v. Lamb, [1989] 1 SCR 1036	Apr 28, 1989	Apr 28, 1989	NS	NJ	NJ	Bench; U	C–U	C–U	C–U	C–U	C–U	C–U	NS
Slaight Communications Inc. v. Davidson, [1989] 1 SCR 1038	Oct 8, 1987	May 4, 1989	M	D	NS	D–P	C–M	C–M	C–M	NJ	NJ	NJ	NJ
Vorvis v. Insurance Corporation of British Columbia, [1989] 1 SCR 1085	Oct 20, 1987	May 4, 1989	NS	C–M	M	C–M	D–P	NS	C–DP	NJ	NJ	NJ	NJ
Canadian Pacific Air Lines Ltd. v. British Columbia, [1989] 1 SCR 1133	Jun 8, 9, 10, 1988	May 4, 1989	NS	C–R; 1	C–C; 1	C–P	C–R; 2	P	C–P	NS	NJ	NJ	NJ
Air Canada v. British Columbia, [1989] 1 SCR 1161	Jun 8, 9, 10, 1988	May 4, 1989	NS	C–R	C–C	C–P	D–P	P	C–P	NS	NJ	NJ	NJ
Brooks v. Canada Safeway Ltd., [1989] 1 SCR 1219	Jun 15, 1988	May 4, 1989	U	C–U	C–U	C–U	C–U	C–U	C–U	NS	NJ	NJ	NJ
Janzen v. Platy Enterprises Ltd., [1989] 1 SCR 1252	Jun 15, 1988	May 4, 1989	U	C–U	C–U	NS	C–U	C–U	C–U	NS	NJ	NJ	NJ
R. v. Turpin, [1989] 1 SCR 1296	Jun 16, 1988	May 4, 1989	C–U	C–U	NS	C–U	U	C–U	C–U	NS	NJ	NJ	NJ
R. v. Howard, [1989] 1 SCR 1337	May 19, 1988	May 18, 1989	NS	NS	C–M	M	NS	C–M	D	NS	NJ	NJ	NJ
Elsom v. Elsom, [1989] 1 SCR 1367	Feb 22, 1989	May 18, 1989	C–U	NJ	NJ	NS	C–U	C–U	C–U	C–U	U	C–U	NJ
Case name	Argued	Decided	Dickson	Beetz	McIntyre	Lamer	Wilson	La Forest	L'Heureux-Dubé	Sopinka	Gonthier	Cory	McLachlin
R. v. Zeolkowski, [1989] 1 SCR 1378	Mar 15, 1989	May 18, 1989	NS	NJ	NJ	NS	C–U	NS	C–U	U	C–U	C–U	NJ
R. v. Mohl, [1989] 1 SCR 1389	May 25, 1989	May 25, 1989	Bench; U	NJ	NJ	Bench; U	C–U	C–U	C–U	C–U	C–U	C–U	C–U
R. v. Lambretta; see also R. v. Adams, [1989] 1 SCR 1391	May 26, 1989	May 26, 1989	Bench; U	NJ	NJ	C–U	C–U	C–U	C–U	C–U	C–U	C–U	C–U
R. v. Tutton, [1989] 1 SCR 1392 (Note: Justice Beetz sat on the hearing, but resigned on November 9, 1988, and did not participate in the decision of any case rendered more than six months after that date.)	Nov 10, 1987	Jun 8, 1989	C–P	NJ	C–R; 1	C–R; 2	P	C–P	C–C; 1	NJ	NJ	NJ	NJ
R. v. Waite, [1989] 1 SCR 1436	Nov 10, 1987	Jun 8, 1989	C–P	NJ	C–R; 1	C–R; 2	P	C–P	C–C; 1	NJ	NJ	NJ	NJ
Scott v. Wawanesa Mutual Insurance Co., [1989] 1 SCR 1445	Dec 15, 1988	Jun 8, 1989	C–D	NJ	C–M	C–M	C–M	D	M	C–D	NJ	NJ	NJ
United States of America v. Cotroni; United States of America v. El Zein, [1989] 1 SCR 1469	May 5, 1988; Feb 22, 23, 1989 (Note: Re-hearing; original panel was Beetz, Wilson, Le Dain, La Forest and L'Heureux‑Dubé JJ.)	Jun 8, 1989	C–M	NJ	NJ	NS	D 1	M	C–M	D 2	C–M	C–M	NJ
R. v. Streu, [1989] 1 SCR 1521	Feb 23, 1989	Jun 8, 1989	NS	NJ	NJ	NS	C–U	C–U	C–U	U	C–U	NS	NJ
YMHA Jewish Community Centre of Winnipeg Inc. v. Brown, [1989] 1 SCR 1532	Mar 14, 1989	Jun 8, 1989	C–U	NJ	NJ	C–U	C–U	C–U	U	C–U	C–U	NS	NJ
Air Canada v. Mcdonnell Douglas Corp., [1989] 1 SCR 1554	Mar 17, 1989	Jun 8, 1989	NS	NJ	NJ	C–U	NS	C–U	C–U	NS	U	C–U	NJ
Case name	Argued	Decided	Dickson	Beetz	McIntyre	Lamer	Wilson	La Forest	L'Heureux-Dubé	Sopinka	Gonthier	Cory	McLachlin
Moysa v. Alberta (Labour Relations Board), [1989] 1 SCR 1572	Mar 20, 1989	Jun 8, 1989	C–U	NJ	NJ	C–U	C–U	NS	C–U	U	C–U	C–U	NJ
R. v. Leblanc, [1989] 1 SCR 1583	Jun 13, 1989	Jun 13, 1989	Bench; U	NJ	NJ	C–U	C–U	C–U	NS	C–U	C–U	C–U	NS
R. v. Gagné, [1989] 1 SCR 1584	Jun 15, 1989	Jun 15, 1989	NS	NJ	NJ	Bench; U	NS	C–U	NS	C–U	C–U	C–U	NS
Service d'optique Élite Ltée v. Ordre des optométristes du Québec, [1989] 1 SCR 1585	Jun 16, 1989	Jun 16, 1989	NS	NJ	NJ	Bench; U	NS	NS	C–U	C–U	C–U	C–U	NS
R. v. Leduc, [1989] 1 SCR 1586	Jun 16, 1989	Jun 16, 1989	NS	NJ	NJ	Bench; U	NS	NS	C–U	C–U	C–U	C–U	NS
Dupont v. Watier, [1989] 1 SCR 1588	Jun 19, 1989	Jun 19, 1989	Bench; U	NJ	NJ	Bench; U	NS	C–U	C–U	C–U	C–U	C–U	NS
R. v. Lavigne, [1989] 1 SCR 1591	Jun 19, 1989	Jun 19, 1989	Bench; U	NJ	NJ	Bench; U	NS	C–U	C–U	C–U	C–U	C–U	NS
Belcourt Construction Co. v. Roger Marchand Ltée, [1989] 1 SCR 1593	Jun 21, 1989	Jun 21, 1989	NS	NJ	NJ	Bench; U	NS	NS	C–U	C–U	C–U	C–U	NS
R. v. Kalanj, [1989] 1 SCR 1594	Mar 28, 1988	Jun 22, 1989	NS	NS	M	D 1	D 2	C–M	C–M	NJ	NJ	NJ	NJ
Pioneer Hi‑Bred Ltd. v. Canada (Commissioner of Patents), [1989] 1 SCR 1623	May 26, 1988	Jun 22, 1989	C–U	NP	NS	U	NS	C–U	C–U	NS	NJ	NJ	NJ
Case name	Argued	Decided	Dickson	Beetz	McIntyre	Lamer	Wilson	La Forest	L'Heureux-Dubé	Sopinka	Gonthier	Cory	McLachlin
R. v. Pringle, [1989] 1 SCR 1645	Oct 13, 1988	Jun 22, 1989	NS	NS	C–U	U	C–U	NS	C–U	C–U	NJ	NJ	NJ
R. v. Conway, [1989] 1 SCR 1659	Dec 16, 1988	Jun 22, 1989	C–M	NJ	NJ	C–R	NS	C–M	M	D	NJ	NJ	NJ
Bell Canada v. Canada (Canadian Radio-Television and Telecommunications Commission), [1989] 1 SCR 1722	Feb 21, 1989	Jun 22, 1989	NS	NJ	NJ	C–U	C–U	C–U	C–U	C–U	U	C–U	NJ
R. v. Meltzer, [1989] 1 SCR 1764	Apr 28, 29, 1988	Jun 29, 1989	NS	NP	U	C–U	C–U	C–U	C–U	NJ	NJ	NJ	NJ
R. v. Heikel, [1989] 1 SCR 1776	Apr 28, 29, 1988	Jun 29, 1989	NS	NP	U	C–U	C–U	C–U	C–U	NJ	NJ	NJ	NJ
R. v. Ouellette, [1989] 1 SCR 1781	April 28, 29, 1988	Jun 29, 1989	NS	NP	U	C–U	C–U	C–U	C–U	NJ	NJ	NJ	NJ
Case name	Argued	Decided	Dickson	Beetz	McIntyre	Lamer	Wilson	La Forest	L'Heureux-Dubé	Sopinka	Gonthier	Cory	McLachlin

=== Supreme Court Reports 1989: volume 2 ===
By the Court (C)
Unanimous reasons for judgment (U)
Concurred in the unanimous reasons (C–U)
Majority reasons for judgment (M)
Concurred in the majority (C–M)
Concurring reasons (C–R)
Concurred in the concurring reasons (C–C)
Plurality reasons (P)
Concurred in the plurality reasons (C–P)
Dissenting reasons (D)
Concurred in the dissent (C–D)
Dissenting in part (D–P)
Concurred in the partial dissent (C–DP)
Seriatim reasons (S)
Concurred in seriatim reasons (C–S)
Motion (Mo)
Did not sit on the appeal (NS)
Did not participate in the judgment (NP)
Not a Justice of the Court at the time of hearing or judgment (NJ)
- "Decision by the Court" means that it is a unanimous judgment of the Court, not attributed to any particular justice.
- "Unanimous reasons for judgment" indicated a unanimous decision, written by a particular justice.
- Multiple concurrences and dissents within a case are numbered, with concurrences by other numbered accordingly. Justices occasionally concur in multiple reasons in a single case; each concurrence is subdivided accordingly.
- Reasons are sometimes drafted jointly by two or more justices.
- Decisions that are given orally from the bench are denoted by "Bench" on the justice who gave the oral decision.

Case name	Argued	Decided	Dickson	McIntyre (Note: Justice McIntyre resigned on February 15, 1989. As permitted by the Supreme Court Act, he continued to participate in judgments on appeals he heard before his resignation, for up to six months.)	Lamer	Wilson	La Forest	L'Heureux-Dubé	Sopinka	Gonthier	Cory	McLachlin (Note: Justice McLachlin was appointed on March 30, 1989, succeeding Justice McIntyre.)
R. v. Provo, [1989] 2 SCR 3	Dec 15, 1988	Jul 13, 1989	C–U	NS	NS	U	C–U	C–U	C–U	NJ	NJ	NJ
British Columbia v. Henfrey Samson Belair Ltd., [1989] 2 SCR 24	Apr 21, 1989	Jul 13, 1989	NS	NJ	C–M	C–M	C–M	C–M	NS	C–M	D	M
Canada (Auditor General) v. Canada (Minister of Energy, Mines and Resources), [1989] 2 SCR 49	Oct 7, 1988	Aug 10, 1989	U	C–U	C–U	C–U	C–U	C–U	C–U	NJ	NJ	NJ
R. v. D. (L.E.), [1989] 2 SCR 111	Dec 14, 1988	Aug 10, 1989	NS	NS	C–M	C–M	C–M	D	M	NJ	NJ	NJ
R. v. Black, [1989] 2 SCR 138	Feb 1, 1989	Aug 10, 1989	NS	NS	C–U	U	C–U	C–U	C–U	NS	NS	NJ
Greater Montreal Protestant School Board v. Quebec (Attorney General), [1989] 2 SCR 167	Jun 27, 1989	Aug 10, 1989	C	NJ	C	C	C	NS	NS	C	NS	NS
Nelles v. Ontario, [1989] 2 SCR 170 (Note: Justice Estey sat on the hearing, but resigned on April 22, 1988, and did not participate in the decision of any case after that date.) (Note: Justice Beetz sat on the hearing, but resigned on November 9, 1988, and did not participate in the decision of any case rendered more than six months after that date.) (Note: Justice Le Dain sat on the hearing, but resigned on November 29, 1988, and did not participate in the decision of any case after that date.)	Feb 29, 1988	Aug 14, 1989	C–P	C–R; 1	P	C–P	C–R; 2	D–P	NJ	NJ	NJ	NJ
Alberta Government Telephones v. Canada (Canadian Radio-television and Telecommunications Commission), [1989] 2 SCR 225	Nov 12, 13, 1987	Aug 14, 1989	M	C–M	C–M	D	C–M	C–M	NJ	NJ	NJ	NJ
IBEW v. Alberta Government Telephones, [1989] 2 SCR 318	Nov 12, 13, 1987	Aug 14, 1989	M	C–M	C–M	C–R	C–M	C–M	NJ	NJ	NJ	NJ
Reference re Workers' Compensation Act, 1983 (Nfld.) (Application to intervene), [1989] 2 SCR 335	Dec 7, 1988	Feb 13, 1989	NS	NS	NS	NS	NS	NS	Mo	NJ	NJ	NJ
Case name	Argued	Decided	Dickson	McIntyre	Lamer	Wilson	La Forest	L'Heureux-Dubé	Sopinka	Gonthier	Cory	McLachlin
Neveu v. Côté Estate (Motion), [1989] 2 SCR 342	Apr 11, 1989	Apr 11, 1989	NS	NJ	NS	NS	NS	NS	NS	Mo	NS	NS
R. v. Cassidy, [1989] 2 SCR 345	Feb 23, 1989	Sep 14, 1989	C–U	NJ	U	C–U	C–U	C–U	C–U	C–U	NS	NJ
MacKay v. Manitoba, [1989] 2 SCR 357	Mar 14, 1989	Sep 14, 1989	C–U	NJ	C–U	C–U	C–U	C–U	C–U	NS	U	NJ
R. v. Smith (Joey Leonard), [1989] 2 SCR 368	Mar 21, 1989	Sep 14, 1989	C–D	NJ	P	C–D	D	C–R; 1	C–R; 2	C–P	NS	NJ
R. v. Leaney, [1989] 2 SCR 393	May 23, 1989	Sep 14, 1989	NS	NJ	D–P	D	NS	C–M	C–M	NS	NS	M
Dallaire v. Paul-Émile Martel Inc., [1989] 2 SCR 419	Jun 21, 1989	Sep 14, 1989	NS	NJ	C–U	NS	NS	C–U	C–U	U	C–U	NS
Bank of Montreal v. Kuet Leong Ng, [1989] 2 SCR 429	Mar 16, 1989	Sep 28, 1989	NS	NJ	C–U	C–U	C–U	NS	NS	U	C–U	NJ
R. v. M. (S.H.), [1989] 2 SCR 446	Apr 27, 1989	Sep 28, 1989	C–M	NJ	C–M	C–M	C–D	D	C–M	C–M	C–M	M
R. v. L. (J.E.), [1989] 2 SCR 510	Apr 27, 1989	Sep 28, 1989	C–M	NJ	C–M	C–M	C–D	D	C–M	C–M	C–M	M
Tremblay v. Daigle, [1989] 2 SCR 530	Aug 8, 1989	Aug 8, 1989; Nov 16, 1989 (Note: Judgment from the bench on August 8, 1989; reasons delivered Nov 16, 1989.)	C	NJ	C	C	C	C	C	C	C	C
Case name	Argued	Decided	Dickson	McIntyre	Lamer	Wilson	La Forest	L'Heureux-Dubé	Sopinka	Gonthier	Cory	McLachlin
Lac Minerals Ltd. v. International Corona Resources Ltd., [1989] 2 SCR 574	Oct 11, 12, 1988	Aug 11, 1989	NS	C–DP	C–R; 1	C–R; 2	M	NS	D–P	NJ	NJ	NJ
Q.N.S. Paper Co. v. Chartwell Shipping Ltd., [1989] 2 SCR 683	Mar 24, 1988; Apr 28, 1989 (Note: Re-hearing; panel on first hearing was Beetz, Lamer, Le Dain, La Forest and L'Heureux-Dubé.)	Sep 28, 1989	NS	NJ	C–C; 1	C–M	M	C–R; 2	C–M	NS	C–M	C–R; 1
Watkins v. Olafson, [1989] 2 SCR 750	May 24, 1989	Sep 28, 1989	C–U	NJ	C–U	C–U	C–U	C–U	C–U	C–U	C–U	U
Scarff v. Wilson, [1989] 2 SCR 776	May 24, 1989	Sep 28, 1989	C–U	NJ	C–U	C–U	C–U	C–U	C–U	C–U	C–U	U
Falk Bros. Industries Ltd. v. Elance Steel Fabricating Co., [1989] 2 SCR 778	May 25, 1989	Sep 28, 1989	C–U	NJ	C–U	C–U	C–U	C–U	C–U	C–U	C–U	U
Nova Scotia (Attorney-General) v. Nova Scotia (Royal Commission Into Marshall Prosecution), [1989] 2 SCR 788	Apr 19, 20, 1989	Oct 5, 1989	NS	NJ	C–U	C–U	U	C–U	NS	C–U	C–U	C–U
MacKeigan v. Hickman, [1989] 2 SCR 796	April 19, 20, 1989	Oct 5, 1989	NS	NJ	C–R; 1	D–P; 1	C–R; 2	C–P	NS	C–P	D–P; 2	P
Chandler v. Alberta Association of Architects, [1989] 2 SCR 848	Jan 30, 1989	Oct 12, 1989	C–M	NS	NS	C–M	C–D	D	M	NJ	NJ	NJ
R. v. D. (G.C.), [1989] 2 SCR 878	Oct 5, 1989	Oct 5, 1989	NS	NJ	NS	Bench; U	NS	NS	C–U	C–U	C–U	C–U
Syndicat des employés de production du Québec et de l'Acadie v. Canada (Canadian Human Rights Commission), [1989] 2 SCR 879 (Note: Justice McIntyre sat on the hearing, but resigned on February 15, 1989, and did not participate in the decision of any case rendered more than six months after that date.)	Feb 2, 1989	Oct 12, 1989	C–R	NP	C–P	C–D	C–P	D	P	NS	NS	NJ
Case name	Argued	Decided	Dickson	McIntyre	Lamer	Wilson	La Forest	L'Heureux-Dubé	Sopinka	Gonthier	Cory	McLachlin
R. v. Docherty, [1989] 2 SCR 941	Mar 15, 1989	Oct 12, 1989	NS	NJ	C–U	U	C–U	C–U	C–U	C–U	C–U	NJ
Hémond v. Coopérative fédérée du Québec, [1989] 2 SCR 962	Jun 20, 1989	Oct 12, 1989	NS	NJ	C–U	NS	NS	C–U	C–U	U	C–U	NS
R. v. Pinske, [1989] 2 SCR 979	Oct 12, 1989	Oct 12, 1989	Bench; U	NJ	Bench; U	C–U	C–U	NS	C–U	NS	C–U	C–U
Arthur D. Little Inc. v. Coopers & Lybrand (Application), [1989] 2 SCR 981	Oct 13, 1989	Oct 13, 1989	NS	NJ	NS	Mo	NS	NS	NS	NS	NS	NS
Caimaw v. Paccar of Canada Ltd., [1989] 2 SCR 983	Dec 13, 1988	Oct 26, 1989	C–S	NP	C–C	D 1	S	D 2	C–R	NJ	NJ	NJ
Lejeune v. Cumis Insurance Society Inc., [1989] 2 SCR 1048	Jun 15, 1989	Oct 26, 1989	NS	NJ	C–U	NS	NS	C–U	C–U	U	C–U	NS
R. v. Hare, [1989] 2 SCR 1065	Nov 2, 1989	Nov 2, 1989	NS	NJ	Bench; U	C–U	C–U	NS	C–U	C–U	C–U	C–U
Canadian Pacific Air Lines Ltd. v. British Columbia (Re‑hearing), [1989] 2 SCR 1067	Nov 6, 1989	Nov 6, 1989	Bench; U	NJ	C–U	C–U	C–U	C–U	NS	NS	NS	NS
Oregon Jack Creek Indian Band v. Canadian National Railway Co., [1989] 2 SCR 1069	Nov 7, 1989	Nov 7, 1989	Bench; U	NJ	NS	C–U	C–U	C–U	C–U	NS	C–U	Bench; U
R. v. Ionson, [1989] 2 SCR 1073	Nov 8, 1989	Nov 8, 1989	Bench; U	NJ	C–U	NS	C–U	C–U	C–U	C–U	C–U	NS
Case name	Argued	Decided	Dickson	McIntyre	Lamer	Wilson	La Forest	L'Heureux-Dubé	Sopinka	Gonthier	Cory	McLachlin
R. v. Nygaard, [1989] 2 SCR 1074	May 26, 1989	Nov 9, 1989	C–M	NJ	C–M	C–M	C–C	D	C–M	C–C	M	C–R
Tétreault‑Gadoury v. Canada (Employment and Immigration Commission) (Motion), [1989] 2 SCR 1110	Oct 24, 1989	Nov 17, 1989	NS	NJ	Mo	NS	NS	NS	NS	NS	NS	NS
R. v. Szlovak, [1989] 2 SCR 1114	Nov 28, 1989	Nov 28, 1989	Bench; U	NJ	C–U	C–U	C–U	C–U	NS	NS	C–U	C–U
R. v. Stensrud, [1989] 2 SCR 1115	Nov 30, 1989	Nov 30, 1989	Bench; U	NJ	C–U	C–U	C–U	C–U	Bench; U	C–U	C–U	C–U
R. v. Hall, [1989] 2 SCR 1117	Nov 30, 1989	Nov 30, 1989	NS	NJ	Bench; U	C–U	NS	C–U	NS	C–U	C–U	NS
R. v. Sarvaria, [1989] 2 SCR 1118	Dec 1, 1989	Dec 1, 1989	NS	NJ	Bench; U	C–U	NS	NS	C–U	C–U	Bench; U	NS
R. v. Smith (Michael Harold), [1989] 2 SCR 1120	May 24, 25, 1989	Dec 7, 1989	C–U	NJ	C–U	C–U	C–U	C–U	U	C–U	C–U	C–U
R. v. Debot, [1989] 2 SCR 1140	Jun 22, 1989	Dec 7, 1989	C–M	NJ	M	C–R; 1	NS	NS	C–R; 2	NS	C–M	NS
R. v. Hearn, [1989] 2 SCR 1180	Dec 8, 1989	Dec 8, 1989	NS	NS	NS	Bench; U	NS	C–U	NS	C–U	C–U	C–U
Tock v. St. John's Metropolitan Area Board, [1989] 2 SCR 1181	Jan 31, 1989	Dec 7, 1989	C–C; 1	NP	C–P	P	C–R; 1	C–P	C–R; 2	NJ	NJ	NJ
Case name	Argued	Decided	Dickson	McIntyre	Lamer	Wilson	La Forest	L'Heureux-Dubé	Sopinka	Gonthier	Cory	McLachlin
Just v. British Columbia, [1989] 2 SCR 1228	Feb 24, 1989	Dec 7, 1989	C–M	NJ	NS	C–M	C–M	C–M	D	C–M	M	NJ
Rothfield v. Manolakos, [1989] 2 SCR 1259	March 21, 1989	Dec 7, 1989	C–P	NS	C–DP; 2	D–P; 1	P	C–DP; 1	NS	C–P	D–P; 2	NJ
Saskatchewan (Human Rights Commission) v. Saskatoon (City), [1989] 2 SCR 1297	Feb 27, 1989	Dec 21, 1989	C–U	NJ	C–U	C–U	C–U	C–U	U	NS	C–U	NJ
Saskatchewan (Human Rights Commission) v. Moose Jaw (City), [1989] 2 SCR 1317	Feb 27, 1989	Dec 21, 1989	C–U	NJ	C–U	C–U	C–U	C–U	U	NS	C–U	NJ
Edmonton Journal v. Alberta (Attorney General), [1989] 2 SCR 1326	Mar 3, 1989	Dec 21, 1989	C–P	NJ	C–P	C–R	D–P	C–DP	C–DP	NS	P	NJ
R. v. Lee, [1989] 2 SCR 1384	Mar 22, 1989	Dec 21, 1989	C–M	NJ	M	D	C–M	NS	C–D	C–R	C–M	NJ
R. v. Buttar, [1989] 2 SCR 1429	Nov 10, 1989	Dec 21, 1989	NS	NJ	C–M	C–M	C–M	C–C	NS	C–M	M	C–R
Case name	Argued	Decided	Dickson	McIntyre	Lamer	Wilson	La Forest	L'Heureux-Dubé	Sopinka	Gonthier	Cory	McLachlin

== Summaries ==
Summary of judgments 1989
Type	Number
By the Court	6
Unanimous	76
Majority with concurrences	9
Majority with dissents	16
Majority with dissents and concurrences	3
Majority with dissents and dissenting in part	3
Majority with dissents in part	3
Plurality with concurrences	4
Plurality with dissents	3
Plurality with concurrences and dissents	5
Seriatim	2
Motions	3
Total	133

Summary of Each Justice's Positions 1989
Decision Type	Dickson	Beetz (Note: The court gave 133 judgments in 1989, with 76 reported in volume 1 of the SCR, and 57 reported in volume 2. Justice Beetz did not participate in any cases that were reported in volume 2, so his total number of entries is only 76.)	McIntyre	Lamer	Wilson	La Forest	L'Heureux-Dubé	Sopinka	Gonthier	Cory	McLachlin
Court	5	0	2	5	5	6	5	5	2	2	1
Unanimous	18	4	3	21	9	3	3	11	7	2	4
Unanimous (concurring)	22	7	10	43	49	57	59	39	32	45	10
Majority	5	2	2	4	2	4	3	3	0	4	4
Majority (concurring)	13	2	9	18	18	18	9	8	7	6	0
Concurring reasons	1	2	4	5	6	7	3	4	1	0	3
Concurred in concurrence	3	1	2	2	0	1	4	0	1	0	0
Plurality	1	0	0	2	4	3	0	1	0	1	1
Plurality (concurrence)	6	0	0	2	1	4	5	0	3	0	0
Seriatim	0	0	0	0	0	1	0	0	0	0	0
Seriatim (concurrence)	1	0	0	0	0	0	0	0	0	0	0
Dissent	0	1	1	1	6	2	11	4	0	1	0
Dissent (concurrence)	2	0	2	2	3	3	0	2	0	0	0
Dissenting in part	0	1	1	2	5	1	1	1	0	2	0
Dissenting in part (concurrence)	0	0	2	4	0	0	5	1	0	0	0
Motion	0	0	0	1	1	0	0	1	1	0	0
Not Sitting	56	13	18	21	24	23	25	28	21	12	22
Not Participating	0	4	3	0	0	0	0	0	0	0	0
Not a Justice	0	39	74	0	0	0	0	25	58	58	88

Judgments Issued, 1980 to 1989
Year	Judgments	Chief Justice
1989	133	Dickson
1988	106	Dickson
1987	94	Dickson
1986	76	Dickson
1985	84	Dickson
1984	63	Dickson
1983	90	Laskin
1982	118	Laskin
1981	112	Laskin
1980	112	Laskin
Ten-Year Average		99
Source: Supreme Court Judgments, 1979 to 1988
