= Reasons of the Supreme Court of Canada by Justice Wilson =

List of reasons written by Justice Bertha Wilson during her time as puisne justice of the Supreme Court of Canada.

== 1982-1985 ==
- Shell Oil Co. v. Commissioner of Patents, [1982] 2 S.C.R. 536
- Kamloops (City) v. Nielsen, [1984] 2 S.C.R. 2
- Guerin v. The Queen [1984] 2 S.C.R. 335 (Concurrence)
- Singh v. Minister of Employment and Immigration, [1985] 1 S.C.R. 177 (Majority)
- R. v. Big M Drug Mart Ltd., [1985] 1 S.C.R. 295 (Concurrence)
- Operation Dismantle v. The Queen [1985] 1 S.C.R. 441 (Concurrence)
- Reference re Section 94(2) of the Motor Vehicle Act, [1985] 2 S.C.R. 486 (Concurrence)

== 1986-1989 ==
- Clarkson v. The Queen, [1986] 1 S.C.R. 383 (Majority)
- Société des Acadiens v. Association of Parents, [1986] 1 S.C.R. 549
- Mills v. The Queen, [1986] 1 S.C.R. 863 (Dissent)
- R. v. Jones, [1986] 2 S.C.R. 284 (Dissent)
- R. v. Edwards Books and Art Ltd., [1986] 2 S.C.R. 713 (Dissent)
- Kosmopolous v. Constitution Insurance Co. of Canada, [1987] 1 S.C.R. 2 (Majority)
- Canada v. Schmidt, [1987] 1 S.C.R. 500 (Concurrence)
- R. v. Rahey, [1987] 1 S.C.R. 588 (Concurrence)
- R. v. Béland, [1987] 2 S.C.R. 398 (Dissent)
- R. v. Wigglesworth, [1987] 2 S.C.R. 541 (Majority)
- R. v. Morgentaler, [1988] (Concurrence)
- R. v. Stevens, [1988] 1 S.C.R. 1153 (Dissent)
- R. v. Strachan, [1988] 2 S.C.R. 980
- Sobeys Stores Ltd. v. Yeomans and Labour Standards Tribunal (NS), [1989] 1 S.C.R. 238 (Majority)
- Andrews v. Law Society of British Columbia, [1989] 1 S.C.R. 143 (Majority)
- Hunter Engineering Co. v. Syncrude Canada Ltd., [1989] 1 S.C.R. 426 (Dissent)
- United States of America v. Cotroni; United States of America v. El Zein, [1989] 1 S.C.R. 1469 (Dissent)
- Irwin Toy Ltd. v. Quebec (Attorney General), [1989] 1 S.C.R. 927 (Majority)
- R. v. Turpin, [1989] 1 S.C.R. 1296 (Majority)
- Mackeigan v. Hickman, [1989] 2 S.C.R. 796 (Dissent)

== 1990-1991 ==
- R. v. Lavallee, [1990] 1 S.C.R. 852 (Majority)
- R. v. Skinner, [1990] 1 S.C.R. 1235 (Dissent)
- R. v. Hebert, [1990] 2 S.C.R. 151
- Alberta Dairy Pool v. Alberta (Human Rights Commission), [1990] 2 S.C.R. 489 (Majority)
- R. v. Hess; R. v. Nguyen, [1990] 2 S.C.R. 906 (Majority)
- R. v. Askov, [1990] 2 S.C.R. 1199 (Concurrence)
- R. v. Wong, [1990] 3 S.C.R. 36 (Dissent)
- McKinney v. The University of Guelph [1990] 3 S.C.R. 229 (Dissent)
- Douglas/Kwantlen Faculty Assn. v. Douglas College, [1990] 3 S.C.R. 570 (Concurrence)
- R. v. Chaulk, [1990] 3 S.C.R. 1303 (Concurrence)
- Lavigne v. Ontario Public Service Employees Union, [1991] 2 S.C.R. 211 (Concurrence)
