= 1988 judgments of the Supreme Court of Canada =

Supreme Court of Canada Cour suprême du Canada
- Established: April 8, 1875
- Jurisdiction: General court of appeal for Canada
- Motto: Justitia et Veritas
- Authorized by: Supreme Court Act, RSC 1985, c. S-26
- Appeals from: Provincial and federal courts of appeal
- Judge term length: Retirement at age 75
- Number of positions: Nine
- Language: English and French
- Website: Supreme Court of Canada

The tables below list the judgments delivered by the Supreme Court of Canada during 1988. The judgments are listed in the order of publication in the Supreme Court Reports, starting with the first judgments of the year, rendered on January 28, 1988, and ending with the last judgment, rendered on December 22, 1988. The tables give a general illustration of the positions taken by each justice in each case, and how justices concurred or dissented with the decisions of the majority.

The Supreme Court normally reserves its judgment after hearing argument on an appeal, and then gives its judgment at some later date. At the time of these judgments, the court would deliver its reserved decisions at a session in open court. In some cases, the court gives its judgment from the bench at the conclusion of the hearing, with a short outline of its reasons. Those judgments are included in the table. The court also could give its decision on an appeal from the bench at the conclusion of the hearing, reasons to follow at a later date.

These tables include cases which were argued in a previous year and reserved, with the judgment given in 1988. Cases which were heard in 1988 and reserved, with judgment in a later year, are included in the article for the later year.

The Court gave 106 judgments in 1988, reported in two volumes of the Supreme Court Reports.

There were several changes in the membership of the court in 1988:

- Justice Estey resigned on April 21, 1988, after ten years on the court.
- Sopinka, a lawyer in private practice in Ontario, was appointed on May 24, 1988, succeeding to Estey.
- Justice Beetz resigned on November 9, 1988, after fourteen years on the court.
- Justice Le Dain resigned on November 29, 1988, after four years on the court.

The Supreme Court Act authorises a retired judge to participate in reserved appeals they have heard prior to their retirement, for up to six months. Estey and Le Dain did not participate in any decisions after their retirement; Beetz did so.

== Judgments ==
=== Supreme Court Reports 1988: volume 1 ===
By the Court (C)
Unanimous reasons for judgment (U)
Concurred in the unanimous reasons (C–U)
Majority reasons for judgment (M)
Concurred in the majority (C–M)
Concurring reasons (C–R)
Concurred in the concurring reasons (C–C)
Plurality reasons (P)
Concurred in the plurality reasons (C–P)
Dissenting reasons (D)
Concurred in the dissent (C–D)
Dissenting in part (D–P)
Concurred in the partial dissent (C–DP)
Seriatim reasons (S)
Concurred in seriatim reasons (C–S)
Motion (Mo)
Did not sit on the appeal (NS)
Did not participate in the judgment (NP)
Not a Justice of the Court at the time of hearing or judgment (NJ)
- "Decision by the Court" means that it is a unanimous judgment of the Court, not attributed to any particular justice.
- "Unanimous reasons for judgment" indicated a unanimous decision, written by a particular justice.
- Multiple concurrences and dissents within a case are numbered, with concurrences by other numbered accordingly. Justices occasionally concur in multiple reasons in a single case; each concurrence is subdivided accordingly.
- Reasons are sometimes drafted jointly by two or more justices.
- Decisions that are given orally from the bench are denoted by "Bench" on the justice who gave the oral decision.

Case name	Argued	Decided	Dickson	Beetz	Estey (Note: Justice Estey retired on April 22, 1988, and did not participate in the decision of any case after that date.)	McIntyre	Lamer	Wilson	Le Dain	La Forest	L'Heureux-Dubé (Note: Justice L'Heureux-Dubé was appointed on April 15, 1987, succeeding Justice Chouinard.)
R. v. Simpson, [1988] 1 SCR 3	May 28, 1986	Jan 28, 1988	C–U	C–U	NS	U	NS	C–U	C–U	NS	NJ
R. v. Morgentaler, [1988] 1 SCR 30	Oct 7, 8, 9, 10, 1986	Jan 28, 1988	S 1	S 2	C–S; 2	D	C–S; 1	S 3	NS	C–D	NJ
R. v. Horse, [1988] 1 SCR 187	Oct 19, 1987	Jan 28, 1988	NS	C–U	U	C–U	C–U	C–U	C–U	NS	C–U
R. v. Antoine, [1988] 1 SCR 212	Dec 14, 1987	Jan 28, 1988	NS	C	C	C	C	NS	C	C	C
R. v. Cronin, [1988] 1 SCR 213	Feb 1, 1988	Feb 1, 1988	NS	NS	Bench; U	C–U	C–U	C–U	C–U	NS	NS
R. v. Graham, [1988] 1 SCR 214	Feb 2, 1988	Feb 2, 1988	NS	NS	Bench; U	C–U	C–U	C–U	NS	NS	C–U
Côte Saint‑Luc (Town of) v. Stern, [1988] 1 SCR 215	Feb 3, 1988	Feb 3, 1988	NS	Bench; U	NS	NS	Bench; U	NS	C–U	C–U	C–U
LeBlanc v. LeBlanc, [1988] 1 SCR 217	Nov 30, 1987	Feb 11, 1988	NS	NS	C–U	C–U	NS	C–U	NS	U	C–U
R. v. Godin, [1988] 1 SCR 226	Mar 30, 1987; Jan 27, 1988 (Note: Re-hearing.)	Feb 11, 1988	NS	C	NS	C	C	C	C	NS	NS
R. v. Green, [1988] 1 SCR 228	Dec 1, 1987	Feb 11, 1988	NS	NS	D Joint	M	D Joint	NS	NS	C–M	C–M
Case name	Argued	Decided	Dickson	Beetz	Estey	McIntyre	Lamer	Wilson	Le Dain	La Forest	L'Heureux-Dubé
R. v. Miller, [1988] 1 SCR 230	Feb 23, 1988	Feb 23, 1988	Bench; U	NS	C–U	C–U	C–U	C–U	NS	NS	NS
R. v. Lévesque, [1988] 1 SCR 231	Feb 24, 1988	Feb 24, 1988	NS	Bench; U	NS	NS	Bench; U	NS	C–U	C–U	C–U
R. v. Bédard, [1988] 1 SCR 233	Feb 24, 1988	Feb 24, 1988	NS	Bench; U	NS	NS	C–U	NS	C–U	C–U	C–U
R. v. Mercure, [1988] 1 SCR 234 (Note: Justice Chouinard sat at the hearing of the appeal, but died on February 6, 1987, before judgment was rendered.)	Nov 26, 27, 1986	Feb 25, 1988	C–M	C–M	D	C–D	C–M	C–M	C–M	M	NJ
Washington (State of) v. Johnson, [1988] 1 SCR 327	Oct 20, 1987	Feb 25, 1988	NS	C–D	C–M	C–D	C–M	M	D	NS	C–M
Molchan v. Omega Oil and Gas Ltd., [1988] 1 SCR 348	Oct 23, 1987	Feb 25, 1988	NS	C–M	M	C–M	C–M	D	NS	NS	NS
R. v. Reakes, [1988] 1 SCR 395	Mar 1, 1988	Mar 1, 1988	NS	NS	Bench; U	C–U	C–U	C–U	NS	NS	C–U
Stamper v. C.N.R., [1988] 1 SCR 396	Mar 1, 1988	Mar 2, 1988	NS	NS	C	C	NS	C	NS	C	C
Locicero v. B.A.C.M. Industries Ltd., [1988] 1 SCR 399	Mar 23, 1988	Mar 23, 1988	NS	NS	Bench; U	C–U	NS	C–U	C–U	C–U	NS
R. v. Crown Zellerbach Canada Ltd., [1988] 1 SCR 401	Jun 26, 1986	Mar 24, 1988	C–M	C–D	NS	C–M	C–D	C–M	M	D	NJ
Case name	Argued	Decided	Dickson	Beetz	Estey	McIntyre	Lamer	Wilson	Le Dain	La Forest	L'Heureux-Dubé
R. v. Cornell, [1988] 1 SCR 461	Feb 25, 26, 1987	Mar 24, 1988	C–U	C–U	C–U	C–U	NS	C–U	U	C–U	NJ
R. v. Stolar, [1988] 1 SCR 480	May 15, 1987	Mar 24, 1988	C–U	C–U	NS	U	NS	C–U	NS	C–U	NS
Snyder v. Montreal Gazette Ltd., [1988] 1 SCR 494	Jun 8, 1987	Mar 24, 1988	C–M	M	NS	C–DP	D–P	C–M	NS	NS	NS
Hills v. Canada (A.G.), [1988] 1 SCR 513	Oct 7, 1987	Mar 24, 1988	C–U	C–U	NS	U	NS	C–U	C–U	NS	NJ
Sport Maska Inc. v. Zittrer, [1988] 1 SCR 564	Oct 22, 1987	Mar 24, 1988	NS	C–R	NS	NS	C–M	C–M	C–M	NS	M
R. v. Lafrance, [1988] 1 SCR 617	Mar 30, 1988	Mar 30, 1988	NS	NS	Bench; U	NS	C–U	C–U	C–U	NS	C–U
R. v. Lang, [1988] 1 SCR 618	Mar 31, 1988	Mar 31, 1988	NS	NS	Bench; U	NS	C–U	C–U	NS	C–U	C–U
R. v. Lawrence, [1988] 1 SCR 619	Apr 21, 1988	Apr 21, 1988	NS	NS	NS	Bench; U	C–U	C–U	C–U	C–U	NS
R. v. Hufsky, [1988] 1 SCR 621	Feb 24, 25, 1987	Apr 28, 1988	C–U	C–U	C–U	C–U	NS	C–U	U	C–U	NJ
R. v. Thomsen, [1988] 1 SCR 640	Feb 26, 1987	Apr 28, 1988	C–U	C–U	C–U	C–U	NS	C–U	U	C–U	NJ
Case name	Argued	Decided	Dickson	Beetz	Estey	McIntyre	Lamer	Wilson	Le Dain	La Forest	L'Heureux-Dubé
R. v. Keyowski, [1988] 1 SCR 657	Mar 25, 1988	Apr 28, 1988	C–U	NS	C–U	C–U	C–U	U	NS	C–U	C–U
Shaklee Canada Inc. v. Canada, [1988] 1 SCR 662	Mar 30, 1988	Apr 28, 1988	C	NS	C	NS	C	C	C	C	C
R. v. Booth, [1988] 1 SCR 663	Apr 29, 1988	Apr 29, 1988	NS	Bench; U	NJ	C–U	Bench; U	C–U	C–U	C–U	C–U
R. v. Dairy Supplies Ltd., [1988] 1 SCR 665	May 2, 1988	May 2, 1988	Bench; U	NS	NJ	C–U	Bench; U	C–U	NS	NS	C–U
R. v. Iuculano and Borrelli, [1988] 1 SCR 667	May 5, 1988	May 5, 1988	NS	Bench; U	NJ	NS	Bench; U	NS	C–U	C–U	C–U
R. v. James, [1988] 1 SCR 669	May 25, 1988	May 25, 1988	Bench; U	NS	NJ	C–U	Bench; U	C–U	C–U	C–U	C–U
R. v. Corbett, [1988] 1 SCR 670	Mar 2, 3, 1987	May 26, 1988	P	C–P	NP	C–R	C–P	NS	C–C	D	NJ
Bell Canada v. Quebec (CSST), [1988] 1 SCR 749	Jan 30, 1986	May 26, 1988	C–U	U	NS	NS	C–U	C–U	C–U	C–U	NJ
Canadian National Railway Co. v. Courtois, [1988] 1 SCR 868	Jan 28, 29, 30, 1986	May 26, 1988	C–U	U	NS	NS	C–U	C–U	C–U	C–U	NJ
Alltrans Express Ltd. v. British Columbia (W.C.B.), [1988] 1 SCR 897	Jan 28, 1986	May 26, 1988	C–U	U	NS	NS	C–U	C–U	C–U	C–U	NJ
Case name	Argued	Decided	Dickson	Beetz	Estey	McIntyre	Lamer	Wilson	Le Dain	La Forest	L'Heureux-Dubé
R. v. Holmes, [1988] 1 SCR 914	Apr 2, 1987	May 26, 1988	S 1	NS	NS	S 2	C–S; 1	NS	C–2; 2	S 3	NJ
R. v. Parisien, [1988] 1 SCR 950	Oct 8, 1987	May 26, 1988	C–U	C–U	NS	NS	C–U	C–U	C–U	U	C–U
R. v. Stewart, [1988] 1 SCR 963	Dec 1, 1987	May 26, 1988	C–U	C–U	NP	C–U	U	C–U	C–U	NS	NS
R. v. Vermette, [1988] 1 SCR 985	Dec 2, 1987	May 26, 1988	NS	NS	NP	C–M	D	C–M	NS	M	NS
Northern Telecom Ltd. v. Cormier, [1988] 1 SCR 996	Feb 4, 5, 1988	May 26, 1988	NS	C–U	NS	NS	C–U	NS	C–U	C–U	U
R. v. Francis, [1988] 1 SCR 1025	Feb 23, 1988	May 26, 1988	C–U	C–U	NP	C–U	C–U	C–U	C–U	U	C–U
Corp. Professionnelle des Médecins v. Thibault, [1988] 1 SCR 1033	Feb 25, 1988	May 26, 1988	NS	C–U	NP	C–U	U	C–U	C–U	C–U	NS
Sacchetti v. Lockheimer, [1988] 1 SCR 1049	Feb 29, 1988	May 26, 1988	NS	C–U	NP	NS	U	NS	C–U	C–U	NS
Federal Business Development Bank v. Québec (CSST), [1988] 1 SCR 1061	Mar 24, 1988	May 26, 1988	NS	C–U	NP	NS	U	C–U	C–U	C–U	C–U
New Brunswick (Minister of Health) v. C. (G. C.), [1988] 1 SCR 1073	May 2, 1988	May 26, 1988	C–U	C–U	NJ	C–U	NS	C–U	NS	NS	U
Case name	Argued	Decided	Dickson	Beetz	Estey	McIntyre	Lamer	Wilson	Le Dain	La Forest	L'Heureux-Dubé
R. v. Upston, [1988] 1 SCR 1083	May 27, 1988	May 27, 1988	Bench; U	C–U	NJ	C–U	C–U	NS	NS	Bench; U	NS
Newfoundland (Attorney General) v. Churchill Falls (Labrador) Corp., [1988] 1 SCR 1085	May 3, 4, 1988	Jun 9, 1988	C	C	NJ	C	C	C	C	C	NS
Hydro‑Québec v. Churchill Falls (Labrador) Corp., [1988] 1 SCR 1087	May 4, 1988	Jun 9, 1988	C	C	NJ	C	C	C	C	C	NS
Insurance Corporation of British Columbia v. Fredrikson, [1988] 1 SCR 1089	Jun 3, 1988	Jun 3, 1988	Bench; U	C–U	NJ	C–U	C–U	C–U	NS	NS	NS
Canadian Pacific Ltd. v. Drumheller (City), [1988] 1 SCR 1091	Jun 14, 1988	Jun 14, 1988	Bench; U	NS	NJ	C–U	C–U	C–U	NS	NS	C–U
R. v. Sterne, [1988] 1 SCR 1093	Jun 14, 1988	Jun 14, 1988	Bench; U	NS	NJ	C–U	C–U	C–U	NS	NS	C–U
R. v. Bachman, [1988] 1 SCR 1094	Jun 14, 1988	Jun 14, 1988	Bench; U	NS	NJ	C–U	C–U	C–U	NS	NS	C–U
R. v. Dufresne, [1988] 1 SCR 1095	Jun 21, 1988	Jun 21, 1988	NS	Bench; U	NJ	NS	Bench; U	C–U	C–U	C–U	NS
R. v. Moore, [1988] 1 SCR 1097	Oct 7, 1987	Jun 30, 1988	D	NS	NS	C–M	M	C–D	C–M	C–M	C–D
Industries Providair Inc. v. Kolomeir, [1988] 1 SCR 1132	Dec 15, 1987	Jun 30, 1988	NS	C–U	NS	NS	C–U	NS	C–U	C–U	U
Case name	Argued	Decided	Dickson	Beetz	Estey	McIntyre	Lamer	Wilson	Le Dain	La Forest	L'Heureux-Dubé
R. v. Stevens, [1988] 1 SCR 1153	Feb 2, 1988	Jun 30, 1988	C–M	C–M	NP	C–M	C–D	D	M	C–M	C–D
Crocker v. Sundance Northwest Resorts Ltd., [1988] 1 SCR 1186	May 28, 1986	Jan 28, 1988	C–U	NS	NP	C–U	NS	U	C–U	C–U	C–U
Central Trust Co. v. Rafuse, [1988] 1 SCR 1206	Jun 30, 1988	Jun 30, 1988	Bench; U	C–U	NS	C–U	C–U	C–U	Bench; U	NS	NS

=== Supreme Court Reports 1988: volume 2 ===
By the Court (C)
Unanimous reasons for judgment (U)
Concurred in the unanimous reasons (C–U)
Majority reasons for judgment (M)
Concurred in the majority (C–M)
Concurring reasons (C–R)
Concurred in the concurring reasons (C–C)
Plurality reasons (P)
Concurred in the plurality reasons (C–P)
Dissenting reasons (D)
Concurred in the dissent (C–D)
Dissenting in part (D–P)
Concurred in the partial dissent (C–DP)
Seriatim reasons (S)
Concurred in seriatim reasons (C–S)
Motion (Mo)
Did not sit on the appeal (NS)
Did not participate in the judgment (NP)
Not a Justice of the Court at the time of hearing or judgment (NJ)
- "Decision by the Court" means that it is a unanimous judgment of the Court, not attributed to any particular justice.
- "Unanimous reasons for judgment" indicated a unanimous decision, written by a particular justice.
- Multiple concurrences and dissents within a case are numbered, with concurrences by other numbered accordingly. Justices occasionally concur in multiple reasons in a single case; each concurrence is subdivided accordingly.
- Reasons are sometimes drafted jointly by two or more justices.
- Decisions that are given orally from the bench are denoted by "Bench" on the justice who gave the oral decision.

Case name	Argued	Decided	Dickson	Beetz (Note: Justice Beetz resigned from the Court on November 9, 1988.)	McIntyre	Lamer	Wilson	Le Dain (Note: Justice Le Dain resigned from the Court on November 29, 1988.)	La Forest	L'Heureux-Dubé	Sopinka (Note: Justice Sopinka was appointed on May 24, 1988, succeeding Justice Estey, who had retired in April.)
R. v. Whyte, [1988] 2 SCR 3 (Note: Justice Estey sat on the hearing, but retired on April 22, 1988, and did not participate in the decision of any case after that date.)	Oct 15, 1987	Jul 14, 1988	U	C–U	C–U	C–U	NS	NS	C–U	C–U	NJ
Canada (Canada Employment and Immigration Commission) v. Gagnon, [1988] 2 SCR 29	Mar 4, 1988	Jul 28, 1988	NS	C–M	C–M	NS	C–C	M	C–M	C–R	NJ
Jove v. Canada (Unemployment Insurance), [1988] 2 SCR 53	Mar 4, 1988	Jul 28, 1988	NS	C–M	C–M	NS	C–C	M	C–M	C–R	NJ
R. v. Kowlyk, [1988] 2 SCR 59	Dec 11, 1987	Sep 1, 1988	C–M	NS	M	NS	D	C–M	C–M	NS	NJ
Forget v. Quebec (Attorney General), [1988] 2 SCR 90	Dec 14, 1987	Sep 1, 1988	D–P; 1	C–M	C–M	M	D–P; 2	C–M	C–M	D	NJ
Canadian Newspapers Co. v. Canada (Attorney General), [1988] 2 SCR 122	Mar 2, 1988	Sep 1, 1988	C–U	NS	C–U	U	C–U	NS	C–U	C–U	NJ
R. v. Papalia, [1988] 2 SCR 137	Nov 30, 1987	Sep 15, 1988	NS	NS	M	C–M	C–M	NS	C–R	NS	NJ
R. v. Chesson, [1988] 2 SCR 148	Oct 15, 1987	Jul 14, 1988	NS	C–M	M	C–M	C–R	NS	NS	NS	NJ
R. v. Clermont, [1988] 2 SCR 171	Oct 7, 1988	Oct 7, 1988	NS	NS	Bench; U	NS	C–U	NS	C–U	C–U	C–U
Greymac Trust Co. v. Ontario (Ontario Securities Commission), [1988] 2 SCR 172	Oct 13, 1988	Oct 13, 1988	Bench; U	NS	C–U	C–U	C–U	NS	C–U	C–U	C–U
Case name	Argued	Decided	Dickson	Beetz	McIntyre	Lamer	Wilson	Le Dain	La Forest	L'Heureux-Dubé	Sopinka
R. v. Scott, [1988] 2 SCR 174	Oct 14, 1988	Oct 14, 1988	Bench; U	NS	C–U	C–U	C–U	NS	C–U	C–U	C–U
Mattabi Mines Ltd. v. Ontario (Minister of Revenue), [1988] 2 SCR 175	Feb 1, 1988	Oct 20, 1988	C–U	NS	C–U	C–U	U	NP	C–U	C–U	NJ
Newfoundland (Attorney General) v. Newfoundland Association of Public Employees, [1988] 2 SCR 204	Mar 3, 1988	Oct 20, 1988	U	NS	C–U	C–U	C–U	NS	C–U	C–U	NJ
British Columbia Government Employees' Union v. British Columbia (Attorney General), [1988] 2 SCR 214	Mar 3, 1988	Oct 20, 1988	M	NS	C–R	C–M	C–M	NS	C–M	C–M	NJ
Quebec (Attorney General) v. Girouard, [1988] 2 SCR 254	Apr 21, 1988	Oct 20, 1988	NS	NS	C	C	C	NP	C	NS	NJ
Angus v. Sun Alliance Insurance Co., [1988] 2 SCR 256	May 26, 27, 1988	Oct 20, 1988	C–U	C–U	C–U	C–U	NS	NS	U	NS	NS
Gell v. Canadian Pacific Ltd., [1988] 2 SCR 271	Jun 6, 1988	Oct 27, 1988	NS	U	NS	NS	C–U	NP	C–U	C–U	NS
Brossard v. Québec (Commission des Droits de la Personne), [1988] 2 SCR 279 (Note: Justice Chouinard sat at the hearing of the appeal, but died on February 6, 1987, before judgment was rendered.) (Note: Justice Beetz participated in the decision after his resignation on November 9, 1988.)	Apr 30, 1986	Nov 10, 1988	NS	M	C–M	C–M	C–R	NP	C–M	NJ	NJ
R. v. Morin, [1988] 2 SCR 345	Jun 30, 1988	Nov 17, 1988	C–M	NS	C–M	C–C	C–R	NS	C–M	NS	M
Petrashuyk v. Law Society of Alberta, [1988] 2 SCR 385	Nov 28, 1988	Nov 28, 1988	Bench; M	NS	C–M	Bench; D	C–M	NS	C–D	C–M	C–M
Case name	Argued	Decided	Dickson	Beetz	McIntyre	Lamer	Wilson	Le Dain	La Forest	L'Heureux-Dubé	Sopinka
R. v. Beare; R. v. Higgins, [1988] 2 SCR 387 (Note: Hearing and decision from the bench; reasons delivered a year later; Justices Estey and Le Dain took part in the decision, but not in the reasons.)	Dec 16, 17, 1987	Dec 1, 1988	C–U	C–U	C–U	C–U	C–U	NP	U	C–U	NJ
R. v. Dyment, [1988] 2 SCR 417	Apr 8, 1987	Dec 8, 1988	C–C	C–P	D	P	C–P	NS	C–R	NS	NJ
R. v. Schwartz, [1988] 2 SCR 443	Oct 15, 1987	Jul 14, 1988	D	C–R	P	C–D	NS	NS	C–P	C–P	NJ
R. v. Simmons, [1988] 2 SCR 495 (Note: Justice Le Dain sat on the hearing, but retired on November 29, 1988, and did not participate in the decision of any case after that date.)	Jan 28, 1988	Dec 8, 1988	M	C–M	C–C; 1	C–M	C–R; 2	NP	C–M	C–R; 1	NJ
R. v. Jacoy, [1988] 2 SCR 548	Jan 28, 1988	Dec 8, 1988	M	C–M	C–R; 1	C–M	C–R; 2	NS	C–M	C–R; 3	NJ
TWU v. British Columbia Telephone Co., [1988] 2 SCR 564	March 29, 1988	December 8, 1988	M Joint	NS	NS	M Joint	M Joint	NP	M Joint	D	NJ
R. v. Gamble, [1988] 2 SCR 595	Jun 17, 1988	Dec 8, 1988	D	C–D	NS	C–M	M	NS	NS	C–M	NS
Mandzuk v. Insurance Corporation of British Columbia, [1988] 2 SCR 650	Dec 12, 1988	Dec 12, 1988	Bench; U	NJ	C–U	C–U	C–U	NJ	C–U	C–U	Bench; U
R. v. Gillespie, [1988] 2 SCR 653	Dec 14, 1988	Dec 14, 1988	NS	NJ	Bench; U	C–U	C–U	NJ	NS	C–U	C–U
Canadian Pacific Ltd. v. Paul, [1988] 2 SCR 654	Mar 26, 27, 1987	Dec 15, 1988	C	C	C	C	C	NP	NS	NJ	NJ
Case name	Argued	Decided	Dickson	Beetz	McIntyre	Lamer	Wilson	Le Dain	La Forest	L'Heureux-Dubé	Sopinka
Clark v. Canadian National Railway Co., [1988] 2 SCR 680	May 8, 1987	Dec 15, 1988	C	C	C	C	C	NP	NS	C	NJ
Ford v. Quebec (Attorney General), [1988] 2 SCR 712	Nov 16, 17, 18, 1987	Dec 15, 1988	C	C	C	C	C	NP	NS	NS	NJ
Devine v. Quebec (Attorney General), [1988] 2 SCR 790	Nov 18, 19, 1987	Dec 15, 1988	C	C	C	C	C	NP	NS	NS	NJ
R. v. Quin, [1988] 2 SCR 825	Dec 8, 1987	Dec 15, 1988	D	C–S; 1	S 1	C–D	S 2	NP	C–D	C–S; 2	NJ
R. v. Bernard, [1988] 2 SCR 833	Dec 8, 1987	Dec 15, 1988	D	C–S; 1	S 1	C–D	S 2	NP	S 3	C–S; 2	NJ
R. v. Showman, [1988] 2 SCR 893	Dec 10, 1987	Dec 15, 1988	C–U	C–U	C–U	U	C–U	NP	C–U	C–U	NJ
R. v. Mack, [1988] 2 SCR 903	Dec 10, 1987	Dec 15, 1988	C–U	C–U	C–U	U	C–U	NP	C–U	C–U	NJ
R. v. Strachan, [1988] 2 SCR 980	Jan 28, 29, 1988	Dec 15, 1988	M	C–M	C–M	C–R; 1	C–R; 2	NP	C–M	C–M	NJ
Sparling v. Québec (Caisse de Dépôt et Placement du Québec), [1988] 2 SCR 1015	Feb 4, 1988	Dec 15, 1988	NS	C–U	C–U	C–U	C–U	NS	U	NS	NJ
Case name	Argued	Decided	Dickson	Beetz	McIntyre	Lamer	Wilson	Le Dain	La Forest	L'Heureux-Dubé	Sopinka
R. v. Mailloux, [1988] 2 SCR 1029	May 6, 1988	Dec 15, 1988	NS	C–U	C–U	U	C–U	NP	C–U	C–U	NJ
Peralta v. Ontario, [1988] 2 SCR 1045	May 25, 1988	Dec 15, 1988	C	C	C	NS	C	NP	C	C	NS
R. v. Jacobs, [1988] 2 SCR 1047	Dec 16, 1988	Dec 16, 1988	Bench; U	NJ	NS	Bench; U	NS	NJ	C–U	C–U	C–U
U.E.S., Local 298 v. Bibeault, [1988] 2 SCR 1048	Oct 29, 30, 1986	Dec 22, 1988	NS	U	C–U	C–U	NS	NP	C–U	NJ	NJ

== Summaries ==
Summary of Judgments 1988
Type	Number
By the Court	12
Unanimous	62
Majority with concurrences	11
Majority with dissents	12
Majority with dissents in part	1
Majority with dissents and dissenting in part	1
Seriatim with concurrence	1
Seriatim with dissents	3
Seriatim with concurrences and dissents	3
Total	106

Summary of Each Justice's Positions 1988
Decision Type	Dickson	Beetz	Estey	McIntyre	Lamer	Wilson	Le Dain	La Forest	L'Heureux-Dubé	Sopinka (Note: The court gave 106 judgments in 1988, with 63 reported in volume 1 of the SCR, and 43 reported in volume 2. Justice Sopinka did not participate in any cases that were reported in volume 1, so his total number of entries is only 43.)
Court	8	9	3	11	10	11	5	7	5	0
Unanimous	15	12	7	6	16	3	4	7	3	1
Unanimous (concurring)	21	27	6	39	34	47	26	38	36	5
Majority	5	2	1	4	3	1	4	3	1	1
Majority (concurring)	7	8	1	12	11	10	5	13	6	1
Concurring reasons	0	2	0	3	1	6	0	2	4	0
Concurred in concurrence	1	1	0	1	1	2	1	0	0	0
Plurality	1	0	0	1	1	0	0	0	0	0
Plurality (concurrence)	0	2	0	0	1	1	0	1	1	0
Seriatim	2	1	0	3	0	3	0	2	0	0
Seriatim (concurrence)	0	2	1	0	2	0	1	0	2	0
Dissent	5	1	2	2	3	3	1	2	2	0
Dissent (concurrence)	0	2	0	2	5	1	0	3	2	0
Dissenting in part	1	0	0	0	1	1	0	0	0	0
Dissenting in part (concurrence)	0	0	0	1	0	0	0	0	0	0
Not Sitting	40	36	20	21	17	17	37	28	28	4
Not Participating	0	0	31	0	0	0	19	0	0	0
Not a Justice	0	1	32	0	0	0	3	0	16	31

Judgments Issued, 1979 to 1988
Year	Judgments	Chief Justice
1988	106	Dickson
1987	94	Dickson
1986	76	Dickson
1985	84	Dickson
1984	63	Dickson
1983	90	Laskin
1982	118	Laskin
1981	112	Laskin
1980	112	Laskin
1979	137	Laskin
Ten-Year Average		99
Source: Supreme Court Judgments, 1979 to 1988
