= List of Supreme Court of Canada cases (Dickson Court) =

This is a chronological list of notable cases decided by the Supreme Court of Canada from Brian Dickson's appointment as Chief Justice on April 18, 1984, to his retirement on June 30, 1990.

== 1984 ==
Case name	Citation	Date	Subject
April 18, 1984 – appointment of Brian Dickson as Chief Justice
Law Society of Upper Canada v Skapinker	[1984] 1 SCR 357	May 3, 1984	Mobility rights, practice of law
Kamloops (City of) v Nielsen	[1984] 2 SCR 2	July 26, 1984	Duty of care of municipality for operational decisions; recoverable economic loss; limitation periods
Hunter v Southam Inc	[1984] 2 SCR 145	September 17, 1984	Search and seizure, section 8
R v Guerin	[1984] 2 SCR 335	November 1, 1984	Aboriginal rights

== 1985 – 1989 ==
Case name	Citation	Date	Subject
Singh v Canada (Minister of Employment and Immigration)	[1985] 1 SCR 177	April 4, 1985	Section 7
April 17, 1985 - Section 15 of the Charter came into effect
R v Big M Drug Mart Ltd	[1985] 1 SCR 295	April 24, 1985	Freedom of religion, section 2(a)
Operation Dismantle v R	[1985] 1 SCR 441	May 9, 1985	Justiciability, section 7
R v Sansregret	[1985] 1 SCR 570	May 9, 1985	Elements of rape
R v Therens	[1985] 1 SCR 613	May 23, 1985	Right to instruct counsel
R v Canadian Dredge & Dock Co	[1985] 1 SCR 662	May 23, 1985	Corporate liability
Reference Re Manitoba Language Rights	[1985] 1 SCR 721	June 13, 1985	Language protection under s.52 of Constitution
Reference Re BC Motor Vehicle Act	[1985] 2 SCR 486	December 17, 1985	Criminal liability; mens rea; section 7
Ontario (Human Rights Commission) v Simpsons-Sears Ltd	[1985] 2 SCR 536	December 17, 1985	Workplace discrimination
R v Valente	[1985] 2 SCR 673	December 19, 1985	Judicial independence
R v Oakes	[1986] 1 SCR 103	February 28, 1986	Reverse onus; section 1 justification
Clarkson v R	[1986] 1 SCR 383	April 24, 1986	Right to retain and instruct counsel
Société des Acadiens v Association of Parents	[1986] 1 SCR 549	May 1, 1986	Minority language rights
Mills v The Queen	[1986] 1 SCR 863		
Beauregard v Canada	[1986] 2 SCR 56	September 16, 1986	Judicial independence
Central Trust Co v Rafuse	[1986] 2 SCR 147	October 9, 1986	Standard of care for lawyers; discoverability doctrine
Scowby v Glendinning	[1986] 2 SCR 226	October 9, 1986	Division of powers
R v Mannion	[1986] 2 SCR 272		
R v Jones	[1986] 2 SCR 284	October 9, 1986	Charter; freedom of religion; security of person; home schooling
E (Mrs) v Eve	[1986] 2 SCR 388	October 23, 1986	Forced sterilization
Retail, Wholesale and Department Store Union, Local 580 v Dolphin Delivery Ltd	[1986] 2 SCR 573	December 18, 1986	Application of the Charter
R v Edwards Books and Art Ltd	[1986] 2 SCR 713	December 18, 1986	Sunday closing; freedom of religion; Oakes test
Kosmopoulos v Constitution Insurance Co of Canada	[1987] 1 SCR 2	January 29, 1987	Lifting the corporate veil
Manitoba (AG) v Metropolitan Stores Ltd	[1987] 1 SCR 110		
R v Collins	[1987] 1 SCR 265	April 9, 1987	Exclusion of evidence test
Reference Re Public Service Employee Relations Act (Alta)	[1987] 1 SCR 313	April 9, 1987	Freedom of association
Public Service Alliance of Canada v Canada	[1987] 1 SCR 424		Freedom of association
Retail, Wholesale and Department Store Union v Saskatchewan	[1987] 1 SCR 460		Freedom of association
Canada v Schmidt	[1987] 1 SCR 500	May 14, 1987	Extradition and fundamental justice
R v Rahey	[1987] 1 SCR 588		
R v Smith	[1987] 1 SCR 1045	June 25, 1987	Cruel and unusual punishment
Action Travail des Femmes v Canadian National Railway Co	[1987] 1 SCR 1114		Discrimination; class action
Reference re Bill 30, An Act to Amend the Education Act (Ont)	[1987] 1 SCR 1148		Division of powers; education
R v Manninen	[1987] 1 SCR 1233	June 25, 1987	Right to seek counsel on arrest
Ontario Public Sector Employees' Union v Ontario (AG)	[1987] 2 SCR 2		
Rio Hotel Ltd v New Brunswick (Liquor Licensing Board)	[1987] 2 SCR 59	July 29, 1987	Criminal law power; federalism
Robichaud v Canada (Treasury Board)	[1987] 2 SCR 84	July 29, 1987	Secondary liability for discrimination
R v Lyons	[1987] 2 SCR 309		
R v Béland	[1987] 2 SCR 398	October 15, 1987	Admissibility of polygraph evidence.
R v Wigglesworth	[1987] 2 SCR 541	November 19, 1987	Charter section 11(h); double jeopardy
R v Vaillancourt	[1987] 2 SCR 636	December 3, 1987	Mens rea; section 7
R v Morgentaler	[1988] 1 SCR 30	January 28, 1988	Abortion
R v Crown Zellerbach Canada Ltd	[1988] 1 SCR 401	March 24, 1988	Peace, order and good government
R v Corbett	[1988] 1 SCR 670		
R v Stevens	[1988] 1 SCR 1153	June 30, 1988	Retrospectivity of Charter, mens rea, fundamental justice
Crocker v Sundance Northwest Resorts	[1988] 1 SCR 1186		Exception to Ogopogo rule
Forget v Quebec (AG)	[1988] 2 SCR 90		Bill 101
British Columbia Government Employees' Union v British Columbia (AG)	[1988] 2 SCR 214	October 20, 1988	Freedom of expression
R v Dyment	[1988] 2 SCR 417	December 8, 1988	Collection of blood samples, section 8
Ford v Quebec (AG)	[1988] 2 SCR 712	December 15, 1988	Quebec's Charter of the French Language
Devine v Quebec (AG)	[1988] 2 SCR 790	December 15, 1988	Minority language rights
R v Strachan	[1988] 2 SCR 980	December 15, 1988	Exclusion of evidence
Union des Employes de Service, Local 298 v Bibeault	[1988] 2 SCR 1048	December 22, 1988	Labour law; judicial review
Sobeys Stores Ltd v Yeomans	[1989] 1 SCR 23	March 2, 1989	Jurisdiction
R v Genest	[1989] 1 SCR 59		
Andrews v Law Society of British Columbia	[1989] 1 SCR 143	February 2, 1989	Equality rights; section 15
Borowski v Canada (AG)	[1989] 1 SCR 342	March 9, 1989	Abortion
R v Potvin	[1989] 1 SCR 525		
Black v Law Society of Alberta	[1989] 1 SCR 591	April 20, 1989	Mobility rights and freedom of association; Charter
General Motors of Canada Ltd v City National Leasing	[1989] 1 SCR 641	April 20, 1989	Federalism
Irwin Toy Ltd v Quebec (AG)	[1989] 1 SCR 927	April 27, 1989	Freedom of speech
Slaight Communications Inc v Davidson	[1989] 1 SCR 1038	May 4, 1989	Labour relations; freedom of expression
Brooks v Safeway Canada Ltd	[1989] 1 SCR 1219	May 4, 1989	Sex discrimination
Janzen v Platy Enterprises Ltd	[1989] 1 SCR 1252	May 4, 1989	Sexual harassment as discrimination based on sex
R v Turpin	[1989] 1 SCR 1296	May 4, 1989	Charter right to trial by jury
R v Tutton	[1989] 1 SCR 1392	June 8, 1989	Criminal negligence
United States v Cotroni,	[1989] 1 SCR 1469	June 8, 1989	Mobility rights; Charter
Moysa v Alberta (Labour Relations Board)	[1989] 1 SCR 1572		
Tremblay v Daigle	[1989] 2 SCR 530	November 16, 1989	Foetus as a legal person in Canadian and Quebec law.
Lac Minerals Ltd v International Corona Resources Ltd	[1989] 2 SCR 574	August 11	Creation of a constructive trust without a fiduciary duty
Mackeigan v Hickman	[1989] 2 SCR 796	October 5, 1989	Judicial immunity
Tétreault-Gadoury v Canada (Employment and Immigration Commission)	[1989] 2 SCR 1110	November 17, 1989	
Edmonton Journal v Alberta (AG)	[1989] 2 SCR 1326	December 21, 1989	Freedom of expression

== 1990 ==
Case name	Citation	Date	Subject
R v Duarte	[1990] 1 SCR 30	January 25, 1990	Surveillance, reasonable expectation of privacy
Bank of Montreal v Hall	[1990] 1 SCR 121	February 1, 1990	Paramountcy of Bank Act security interests in context of provincial property and civil rights power
R v Brydges	[1990] 1 SCR 190	February 1, 1990	Right to counsel
R v Storrey	[1990] 1 SCR 241	February 15, 1990	Arrest elements
International Woodworkers of America, Local 2-69 v Consolidated-Bathurst Packaging Ltd	[1990] 1 SCR 282	March 15, 1990	Procedural Fairness and Natural justice
Mahe v Alberta	[1990] 1 SCR 342	March 15, 1990	Minority language rights
Thomson Newspapers Ltd v Canada (DIRRTPC)	[1990] 1 SCR 425		
Knight v Indian Head School Division No 19	[1990] 1 SCR 653	March 29, 1990	Judicial Review Procedural Fairness requirements
Starr v Houlden	[1990] 1 SCR 1366	April 5, 1990	Scope of Judicial inquiries
R v Lavallee	[1990] 1 SCR 852	May 3, 1990	battered woman syndrome
R v Ladouceur	[1990] 1 SCR 957	May 31, 1990	Arbitrary detention, random spot-checks
R v Sparrow	[1990] 1. SCR 1075	May 31, 1990	Aboriginal rights
Prostitution Reference	[1990] 1 SCR 1123	May 31, 1990	Meaning of freedom of expression
R v Skinner	[1990] 1 SCR 1235	May 31, 1990	Freedom of expression, freedom of association, soliciting prostitutes
R v Hebert	[1990] 2 SCR 151	June 21, 1990	Right to silence
Apple Computer Inc v Mackintosh Computers Ltd	[1990] 2 SCR 209	June 21, 1990	Copyright law of Canada
Rocket v Royal College of Dental Surgeons of Ontario	[1990] 2 SCR 232	June 21, 1990	Freedom of expression
June 30, 1990 – retirement of Chief Justice Brian Dickson

== See also ==
- List of notable Canadian Courts of Appeals cases
