= Janzen v Platy Enterprises Ltd =

- Supreme Court of Canada

Hearing: June 15, 1988 Judgment: May 4, 1989
- Full case name: Dianna Janzen and Tracy Govereau v Platy Enterprises Limited, and Platy Enterprises Limited, carrying on business under the firm name and style of Pharos Restaurant, and Tommy Grammas
- Citations: [1989] 1 S.C.R. 1252
- Docket No.: 20241
- Ruling: Janzen and Govereau appeal allowed.

Court membership
- Chief Justice: Brian Dickson; Puisne Justices: Jean Beetz, William McIntyre, Antonio Lamer, Bertha Wilson, Gerald Le Dain, Gérard La Forest, Claire L'Heureux-Dubé, John Sopinka

Reasons given
- Unanimous reasons by: Dickson C.J.
- Le Dain and Sopinka J. took no part in the consideration or decision of the case.

Laws applied
- Robichaud v Canada (Treasury Board), [1987] 2 S.C.R. 84, Brooks v Canada Safeway Ltd, [1989] 1 S.C.R.

Janzen v Platy Enterprises Ltd [1989] 1 S.C.R. 1252 is a leading Supreme Court of Canada decision on discrimination. The Court found that sexual harassment was a form of discrimination based on sex and so was prohibited by the Manitoba Human Rights Act.

== Background ==
During the fall of 1982, Dianna Janzen and Tracy Govereau were both employed as waitresses at Pharos restaurant in Winnipeg, Manitoba. Tommy Grammas, a cook at the restaurant, began making sexual advances to Janzen. She repeatedly made it clear that the advances were not welcome, nonetheless they continued. When Janzen approached Eleftherois Anastasiadis, the manager of the restaurant, he said, "if it's about Tommy, I can't do anything about it." Eventually, the advances were replaced with uncooperative and threatening behaviour. When Anastasiadis was approached about it he refused to act on it and instead fired the women.

The women sued Platy Enterprises Ltd., the owner of Phraos restaurant, as well as Tommy, under section 6(1) of the Manitoba Human Rights Act, for violating their right to equal opportunity by firing them because of their sex.

The Manitoba Human Rights Tribunal held that the women had been subject to sexual harassment on the basis of sex and so the restaurant owners were in violation of section 6(1) of the Act. The Court of Queen's Bench upheld the decision.

The Manitoba Court of Appeal overturned the Court of Queen's Bench. The court found that sexual harassment was not considered discrimination on the basis of sex and that the employer could not be held vicariously liable of the conduct of the employee.

== Ruling of the Court ==
Chief Justice Dickson, writing for a unanimous Court, held that the restaurant's conduct did constitute discrimination on the basis of sex. Dickson rejected the Court of Appeal's ruling that the harassment was not based on sex because not all female employees were targeted. He stated that discrimination on the basis of sex is where there is a "practice or attitude which had the effect of limiting the conditions of employment of, or the employment opportunities available to, employees on the basis of a characteristic related to gender."

== See also ==
- List of Supreme Court of Canada cases (Dickson Court)
