= R v Keegstra =

1990 Supreme Court of Canada case on hate speech

- Supreme Court of Canada

Hearing: December 5, 6, 1989 Judgment: December 13, 1990
- Full case name: Her Majesty The Queen v James Keegstra
- Citations: [1990] 3 SCR 697
- Docket No.: 21118
- Prior history: R. v. Keegstra, 1988 ABCA 234; R. v. Keegstra, 1984 CanLII 1313 (AB KB).
- Ruling: Crown appeal allowed; constitutionality of s. 319 of the Criminal Code upheld.

Holding
- s. 319(3)(a) of the Criminal Code infringes on section 2(b) rights of freedom on expression, but is justified under section 1 of the Charter.

Court membership
- Chief Justice: Brian Dickson; Puisne Justices: Antonio Lamer, Bertha Wilson, Gérard La Forest, Claire L'Heureux-Dubé, John Sopinka, Charles Gonthier, Peter Cory, Beverley McLachlin

Reasons given
- Majority: Chief Justice Dickson (Justices Wilson, L'Heureux-Dubé, and Gonthier JJ concurring)
- Dissent: Justice McLachlin (Justices Sopinka and La Forest concurring)
- Justices Lamer and Cory took no part in the consideration or decision of the case.

Laws applied
- Irwin Toy Ltd v Quebec (AG) (1989); R v Whyte (1988); R v Oakes (1986); R v Morgentaler (1988); Rocket v Royal College of Dental Surgeons of Ontario (1990)

R v Keegstra, [1990] 3 SCR 697 is a freedom of expression decision of the Supreme Court of Canada where the court upheld the Criminal Code provision prohibiting the wilful promotion of hatred against an identifiable group as constitutional under the freedom of expression provision in section 2(b) of the Canadian Charter of Rights and Freedoms. It is a companion case to R v Andrews.

== Background ==
James Keegstra (1934–2014) was a public high school teacher in Eckville, Alberta, who began in the position in 1968. He also took on many community roles as a deacon and Sunday school teacher, and in 1974 was acclaimed as mayor of the community, a position he held until 1983. Keegstra's antisemitic teachings had resulted in complaints in the late-1970s but little action was taken by the school board. Keegstra was warned by the board superintendent in December 1981 to stop "teaching these biased and prejudiced views" and stick to teaching the grade 12 social studies curriculum. The school board eventually fired Keegstra in December 1982.

In 1984, he was charged under section 281.2(2) of the Criminal Code that he "..did unlawfully promote hatred against an identifiable group, to wit: the Jewish people, by communicating statements while teaching to students at Eckville High School." (Note: R. v. Keegstra, 1988 ABCA 234 (CanLII).) The Criminal Code provision, now section 319(2), makes it a criminal offence to promote hatred: "Every one who, by communicating statements, other than in private conversation, wilfully promotes hatred against any identifiable group". During classes, he described Jews as a people of profound evil who had "created the Holocaust to gain sympathy". He also tested his students in exams on his theories and opinions of Jews.

Keegstra held antisemitic views and believed in a Jewish conspiracy bent on world domination and annihilating Christianity. He asserted that the current historical information being taught in universities and schools is a trap set by the Jews to mislead the public. He claimed that the education system has failed because of their awareness regarding Jewish conspiracy with the Holocaust. Keegstra believed he was one of the few chosen individuals who were aware of the treachery and wanted to put a stop to it. Keegstra would teach his classes concepts that were not a part of the Alberta Social Studies Curriculum.

== Proceedings in the Alberta courts ==
At the beginning of his trial in the Alberta Court of Queen's Bench, Keegstra applied to the trial judge to have the charge quashed for violation of his freedom of expression; however, this motion was denied. (Note: R. v. Keegstra, 1984 CanLII 1313 (AB QB)) A jury convicted Keegstra in a three and a half month trial, and he was ordered to pay a $5,000 fine.

He then appealed his conviction to the Court of Appeal of Alberta on the basis that section 319(2) breached the constitutional right to freedom of expression under section 2(b) of the Charter. On June 6, 1988, the Court of Appeal of Alberta ruled that section 319(2) did indeed breach section 2(b) and could not be upheld under section 1 of the Charter. The Crown appealed this decision to the Supreme Court of Canada.

== Decision of the Supreme Court ==
The issue before the Supreme Court was whether sections 319(2) and 319(3)(a) of the Criminal Code violated section 2(b) and section 11(d) of the Charter and if so, whether they could be upheld under section 1. By a 4–3 decision, the Court upheld the constitutionality of the provisions. (Note: R v Keegstra, [1990] 3 SCR 697.)

=== Majority decision ===
The majority decision was written by Chief Justice Brian Dickson. He held that the provisions clearly violated section 2(b) as it was legislation designed to suppress expression. In this, Dickson wrote that freedom of expression within section 2 would not be limited by section 15 (equality rights) and section 27 (recognition of multiculturalism) of the Charter. Dickson explained that using sections 15 and 27 in this way would contradict "the large and liberal interpretation given the freedom of expression in Irwin Toy" and moreover, "s. 1 of the Charter is especially well suited to the task of balancing".

Dickson then turned to the question of section 1 of the Charter. He found that the violation of freedom of expression was justified under section 1 as the law had a rational connection to its objective, it was not overly limiting and the seriousness of the violation was not severe as the content of the hateful expression has little value to protect. He, therefore, allowed the Crown appeal and remitted the case to the Court of Appeal to deal with issues they had not addressed in their decision.

=== Dissenting reasons ===
Justice Beverley McLachlin wrote the dissenting reasons. She agreed with Dickson that the provisions infringed section 2(b) of the Charter. However, she would have held that the infringement of freedom of expression could not be justified under section 1. She therefore would have dismissed the appeal.

== Subsequent proceedings ==
When the matter returned to the Alberta Court of Appeal, that Court held that based on the original submissions, it would have also allowed Keegstra's appeal on the basis that the trial judge had not allowed Keegstra to challenge jurors for cause based on pre-trial publicity. The Court therefore allowed Keegstra's appeal and directed a new trial. (Note: R. v. Keegstra, 1991 ABCA 97 (CanLII).) Keegstra was convicted at the second trial, which resulted in another set of appeals, again ending in the Supreme Court, which affirmed the conviction. (Note: R. v. Keegstra, [1996] 1 SCR 458.)

== Aftermath ==
=== Effect on the town of Eckville ===
In addition to being a public school teacher, Keegstra was also the mayor of Eckville. The town of Eckville was scrutinized by the media due to this case. The residents of the town felt that the ongoing trial tarnished their image. They were called antisemites by the media and received negative attention. Townsfolk of Eckville declared that this was unfair treatment thrust upon the entire town due to the actions of one man.

=== Implications of the Supreme Court case for similar issues ===
The case provided precedent for other freedom of expression and hate speech cases. In R v Butler (1992), a case considering laws against obscenity, the Supreme Court cited Keegstra to note that freedom of expression should be interpreted generously and was infringed in that case. In another hate speech case, R v Krymowski (2005), the Court noted that Keegstra had demonstrated hate speech laws were constitutional. Building on expectations that there must be evidence of promotion of hatred against a group, the Court added in Krymowski that courts should then consider the "totality of the evidence" to conclude whether a group had fallen victim to hate speech.

=== Action by the Alberta Teachers' Association ===
The Alberta Teachers' Association had modified its code of ethics in order to prevent any hate crime against an ethnic group. This included the right to protect the self-respect of any individual or group regardless of any prejudgment to race, religion, age or other physical characteristics. New requests were made to qualify new teachers through constant assessments and Minister of Education David Thomas King formed a council to establish the Alberta Teacher Standards. The council’s main focus was to devise procedures for classroom checkup of teacher proficiency. Keegstra was fined $5,000 and his professional teaching certificate was suspended. The guilty verdict in the trial did not cause Keegstra to abandon his antisemitic beliefs.

== In popular culture ==
The 1988 American made-for-TV film Evil in Clear River dramatizes a very similar story of a Holocaust-denying high school teacher in small-town Alberta who is prosecuted under section 281.2(2). It was made before R v Keegstra reached its ultimate conclusion in the Supreme Court of Canada.

== See also ==
- List of Supreme Court of Canada cases (Lamer Court)
