= R v Brydges =

- Supreme Court of Canada

Hearing: November 10, 1989 Judgment: February 1, 1990
- Full case name: William Brydges v. Her Majesty The Queen
- Citations: [1990] 1 S.C.R. 190
- Docket No.: 20583
- Prior history: Judgment for the Crown in the Court of Appeal for Alberta.
- Ruling: Appeal allowed.

Holding
- When a detainee expresses concerns about his rights to counsel due to not being able to afford a lawyer, section 10(b) of the Canadian Charter of Rights and Freedoms requires the police to advise the detainee about the ability to speak to free duty counsel if a duty counsel program is available.

Court membership
- Chief Justice: Brian Dickson; Puisne Justices: Antonio Lamer, Bertha Wilson, Gérard La Forest, Claire L'Heureux-Dubé, John Sopinka, Charles Gonthier, Peter Cory, Beverley McLachlin

Reasons given
- Majority: Lamer J., joined by Wilson, Gonthier and Cory JJ.
- Concurrence: La Forest J., joined by L'Heureux-Dubé and McLachlin JJ.
- Dickson C.J. and Sopinka J. took no part in the consideration or decision of the case.

Laws applied
- R. v. Parks (1988), 33 C.R.R. 1; Clarkson v. The Queen, [1986] 1 S.C.R. 383

R v Brydges, [1990] 1 S.C.R. 190 is a leading Supreme Court of Canada decision on the right to retain and instruct counsel under section 10(b) of the Canadian Charter of Rights and Freedoms. The Court held that the right imposed a duty upon the police to provide information and access to a legal aid lawyer if needed. From this case came the term "Brydges Counsel" to refer to legal aid lawyers that assist recently arrested individuals.

== Background ==
William Brydges was arrested in Manitoba in relation to a murder in Edmonton. Upon arriving at the police station, Brydges was informed of his right to retain and instruct counsel and gave him the opportunity to contact a lawyer. He was put in an interview room, and again was given another chance to contact a lawyer. Brydges asked one of the officers if Manitoba had a Legal Aid service. The officer said that he imagined so, to which Brydges replied "won't be able to afford anyone, hey? That's the main thing." The officer asked Brydges if he had a reason to contact a lawyer. Brydges replied "Not right now, no". After some time in interrogation, the accused asked for a Legal Aid lawyer. When he got in touch with one, he was advised not to say anything.

At trial, the judge found that Brydges had made a request for a lawyer at the beginning of the questioning, and that the police did not adequately help Brydges in contacting a lawyer when he first asked about Legal Aid. Thus, it was held that the police violated Brydges' right to counsel under section 10(b) of the Charter, and that the statements he made in the interrogation should be excluded under section 24(2).

On appeal, the Court set aside the verdict and ordered a new trial.

The issue before the Supreme Court was whether there was a violation of section 10(b).

== Opinion of the Court ==
In a four to three decision, the Court held that there was a violation of section 10(b). Lamer, writing for the majority, held that the police have both a duty to inform an accused of their right as well as provide sufficient information on obtaining advice from duty counsel.

== See also ==
- List of Supreme Court of Canada cases (Dickson Court)
- Escobedo v. Illinois and Miranda v. Arizona
