= R v Dyment =

- Supreme Court of Canada

Hearing: April 8, 1987 Judgment: December 8, 1988
- Full case name: Her Majesty The Queen v Brandon Roy Dyment
- Citations: [1988] 2 S.C.R. 417
- Docket No.: 19786
- Ruling: Crown appeal dismissed

Court membership
- Chief Justice: Brian Dickson; Puisne Justices: Jean Beetz, Willard Estey, William McIntyre, Antonio Lamer, Bertha Wilson, Gerald Le Dain, Gérard La Forest, Claire L'Heureux-Dubé

Reasons given
- Majority: Lamer J. (paras. 41-43), joined by Beetz and Wilson JJ.
- Concurrence: La Forest J. (paras. 1-40), joined by Dickson C.J.
- Dissent: McIntyre J. (paras. 44-48)

R v Dyment, [1988] 2 S.C.R. 417 is a leading Supreme Court of Canada decision on the constitutional right to privacy under section 8 of the Canadian Charter of Rights and Freedoms.

== Background ==
In April 1982, Brandon Dyment was in an auto accident on a highway. A doctor soon came to the scene, and Dyment was taken to the hospital by a Royal Canadian Mounted Police (RCMP) officer. At the hospital a blood sample was taken from him for medical purposes while unconscious. When Dyment woke up, and while still suffering from a concussion from the accident, he told the doctor that he had been drinking and had taken antihistamine tablets. The doctor talked with a RCMP officer and handed over the blood sample. Police analysis of the blood found that the alcohol level was above the legal limit and so Dyment was charged with being in care or control of a motor vehicle having consumed alcohol in such quantity that the proportion in his blood exceeded 80 milligrams of alcohol in 100 milliliters of blood contrary to section 236 of the Criminal Code.

At trial, Dyment was convicted.

The issue before the Supreme Court was whether:

1. the taking of possession of the blood sample by the police officer amounted to a seizure as contemplated by s. 8 of the Charter;
2. taking of the sample was unreasonable and so infringed s. 8;
3. in excluding the evidence of the analysis of the blood under s. 24(2) of the Charter on the ground that the admission of this evidence would bring the administration of justice into disrepute.

== Reasons of the court ==
The Supreme Court upheld the lower court decision that the RCMP's seizing of blood taken for medical purposes was a violation of section 8 of the Charter and should be excluded under section 24(2).

La Forest, writing concurring reasons, examined the scope of protection provided by section 8. He found that underlying section 8 is a right to privacy, which he described as a constitutionally protected value, stating that:

privacy is at the heart of liberty in a modern state...[g]rounded in man's physical and moral autonomy, privacy is essential for the well-being of the individual. For this reason alone, it is worthy of constitutional protection, but it also has profound significance for the public order. The restraints imposed on government to pry into the lives of the citizen go to the essence of a democratic state. (pp. 427-28)

== See also ==
- List of Supreme Court of Canada cases (Dickson Court)
