= Devine v Quebec (AG) =

- Supreme Court of Canada

Hearing: November 18, 19, 1987 Judgment: December 15, 1988
- Citations: [1988] 2 S.C.R. 790, 55 D.L.R. (4th) 641, 10 C.H.R.R. 5610, [1989] 36 C.R.R. 64
- Docket No.: 20297

Court membership
- Chief Justice: Brian Dickson; Puisne Justices: Jean Beetz, Willard Estey, William McIntyre, Antonio Lamer, Bertha Wilson, Gerald Le Dain, Gérard La Forest, Claire L'Heureux-Dubé

Reasons given
- Unanimous reasons by: The Court

Laws applied
- Ford v. Quebec (Attorney General), [1988] 2 S.C.R. 712; Cusson v. Robidoux, [1977] 1 S.C.R. 650; Forget v. Quebec (Attorney General), [1988] 2 S.C.R. 90

Devine v Quebec (AG), [1988] 2 S.C.R. 790 is a leading Supreme Court of Canada decision on the constitutional protection of minority language rights.

== Background ==
Allan Singer was a Montreal printer who mostly served anglophone clientele. For over 30 years, his store front had a sign advertising his store that was written in English only. He was charged under the Charter of the French Language for having an English sign.

Singer and several others brought an action to strike down provisions of the French Language Charter and the Regulation respecting the language of commerce and business, which required commercial signs to be in French only, as being laws that were ultra vires the province, and in violation of his freedom of expression under section 2(b) of the Canadian Charter and section 3 of the Quebec Charter, right to equality under 15(1) of the Canadian Charter, and his right against discrimination under section 10 of the Quebec Charter.

== Issues ==
The issues before the Supreme Court were:

1. whether the Language Charter was valid provincial law
2. whether the provisions prohibiting English signs violated the right to freedom of expression under section 2(b) of the Canadian Charter
3. and if so, could it be saved under section 1 of the Canadian Charter.

== Judgment of the Court ==
In a unanimous decision, the Supreme Court held that the Language Charter concerned a valid provincial matter but it violated Singer's freedom of expression under section 2(b) of the Canadian Charter as it prohibited the use of English.

The Court rejected Singer's argument that the law restricted mobility as protected under the Charter. The law only established conditions for doing business but did not restrict anyone's comings or goings.

On the federalism issue, the Court rejected Singer's argument that the law constituted Criminal law under the Constitution Act, 1867. Though there was a prohibition and a penalty, the Act as a whole it constituted a regulatory scheme directed as the linguistic mode of certain commercial activities, and did not resemble any traditional criminal matters based on morality or public order.

== See also ==
- List of Supreme Court of Canada cases (Dickson Court)

== Notes ==
sometimes called Allan Singer Ltd. v. Quebec Attorney General
