= Irwin Toy Ltd v Quebec (AG) =

- Supreme Court of Canada

Hearing: November 19–20, 1987 Judgment: Decided April 27, 1989
- Full case name: The Attorney General of Quebec v Irwin Toy Limited
- Citations: [1989] 1 S.C.R. 927
- Docket No.: 20074
- Prior history: Appeal allowed

Court membership
- Chief Justice: Brian Dickson; Puisne Justices: Jean Beetz, Willard Estey, William McIntyre, Antonio Lamer, Bertha Wilson, Gerald Le Dain, Gérard La Forest, Claire L'Heureux-Dubé

Reasons given
- Majority: Dickson C.J. and Lamer and Wilson JJ.
- Dissent: McIntyre J., joined by Beetz J.
- Estey J. took no part in the consideration or decision of the case.

Laws applied
- Attorney General of Quebec v. Kellogg's Co. of Canada, (1978); R. v. Oakes, (1986); Ford v. Quebec (Attorney General), (1988); Devine v. Quebec (Attorney General), (1988); R. v. Big M Drug Mart Ltd., (1985)

Irwin Toy Ltd v Quebec (AG), [1989] 1 S.C.R. 927 is a landmark Supreme Court of Canada decision on freedom of expression in section 2(b) of the Canadian Charter of Rights and Freedoms. The court held that in order to determine if a breach of section 2(b) had occurred one first had to determine whether the conduct constituted non violent activity which attempted to convey meaning. This changed the law of the constitution of Quebec. The next step was to consider whether the effect or purpose of the legislation was to restrict freedom of expression. Applying the analysis, the Court held that a Quebec law that restricted advertising directed to children was valid law which violated section 2(b) but could be justified under section 1.

== Background ==
The province of Quebec passed legislation that prohibited "commercial advertising directed at persons under thirteen years of age." The law was challenged on the basis that it violated the freedom of expression under section 2(b) of the Charter.

== Reasons of the court ==
Chief Justice Dickson, Justice Lamer, and Justice Wilson wrote the decision of the majority.

=== Expression ===
The Justices considered the rationale of the freedom of expression provision and enumerated three grounds:

1. seeking and attaining the truth is an inherently good activity;
2. participation in social and political decision-making is to be fostered and encouraged; and
3. the diversity in forms of individual self-fulfillment and human flourishing ought to be cultivated in an essentially tolerant, indeed welcoming, environment not only for the sake of those who convey a meaning, but also for the sake of those to whom it is conveyed.

The Justices then considered the scope of expression. They defined it broadly as any activity that "attempts to convey meaning". The Court used the example of unlawful parking to illustrate the breadth of the right. If an individual parks against the rules in order to protest rule or policy, their action will count as expression. However, it excluded activities that are "purely physical and [do] not convey or attempt to convey meaning" as well as activities that are of a violent form.

The majority re-affirmed the decision of Ford v. Quebec (1988) by finding that freedom of expression included advertising. Accordingly, they found that the Quebec law violated section 2(b).

=== Justified limitation ===
The Justices then considered whether the law was justified under section 1. They dismissed the argument that the law was not prescribed by law. A law only needed to have an "intelligible standard" which the Quebec law satisfied.

On the inquiry into minimal impairment the Court held that when the government attempts to justify the necessity of a complete ban, courts will not be restrictive to social sciences, however, the government must establish a "sound evidentiary basis" for their conclusions.

The Court was unsympathetic to the harm to Irwin. The effects of the ban, said the Court, were not so severe as to override the objective of the ban. The advertisers would always be able to direct ads to adults or use other means to sell children's products.

== See also ==
- List of Supreme Court of Canada cases (Dickson Court)
