= R v Wigglesworth =

- Supreme Court of Canada

Hearing: 3–4 March 1987 Judgment: 19 November 1987
- Citations: [1987] 2 S.C.R. 541, 45 D.L.R. (4th) 235, [1988] 1 W.W.R. 193, 37 C.C.C. (3d) 385, [1988] 28 Admin. L.R. 294 • (1987), [1988] 32 C.R.R. 219, 60 C.R. (3d) 193, 24 O.A.C. 321, 61 Sask. R. 105
- Docket No.: 18613

Court membership
- Chief Justice: Brian Dickson; Puisne Justices: Jean Beetz, Willard Estey, William McIntyre, Antonio Lamer, Bertha Wilson, Gerald Le Dain, Gérard La Forest, Claire L'Heureux-Dubé

Reasons given
- Majority: Wilson J., joined by Dickson C.J. and Beetz, McIntyre, Lamer and La Forest JJ.
- Dissent: Estey J.

R v Wigglesworth, [1987] 2 S.C.R. 541 is a Supreme Court of Canada decision on the constitutional right against double jeopardy under Section 11(h) of the Canadian Charter of Rights and Freedoms. The Court gave a two-part test to determine whether a proceeding deals with a criminal matter.

== Background ==
Roger Wigglesworth was a Royal Canadian Mounted Police (RCMP) officer who committed an assault and was charged with assault under the Royal Canadian Mounted Police Act. He was initially convicted of a "major service offence" under the Act by a disciplinary board and ordered to pay a fine of $300.

Subsequently, he was also charged with common assault under the Criminal Code. He argued that he could not be charged on the grounds that it would constitute double jeopardy in violation of Section 11(h) of the Charter.

== Decision of the Court ==
Justice Wilson, writing for the Court majority, found that Section 11(h) had not been violated by the second charge, as the first charge under the Royal Canadian Mounted Police Act was disciplinary in nature and related to the private sphere of RCMP conduct. Wigglesworth could be charged with common assault.

She noted that 11(h) only applies to criminal matters and so both charges must be criminal in nature to invoke the double-jeopardy defence. She proposed a two-part test to determine whether a proceeding is in relation to a criminal matter and therefore invoking Section 11(h). First, it must be determined whether the matter is of a "public nature, intended to promote public order and welfare within a public sphere of activity". Second, it must be determined whether the matter involves "the imposition of true penal consequences".

Estey J. dissented.

== See also ==
- List of Supreme Court of Canada cases (Dickson Court)
