= Clarkson v R =

- Supreme Court of Canada

Hearing: May 16, 1985 Judgment: April 24, 1986
- Full case name: Lana Louise Clarkson v. Her Majesty The Queen
- Citations: [1986] 1 S.C.R. 383
- Ruling: Clarkson's appeal was allowed.

Court membership
- Chief Justice: Brian Dickson; Puisne Justices: Jean Beetz, Willard Estey, William McIntyre, Julien Chouinard, Antonio Lamer, Bertha Wilson, Gerald Le Dain, Gérard La Forest

Reasons given
- Majority: Wilson J. (paras. 1-25), joined by Estey, Lamer, Le Dain and La Forest JJ.
- Concurrence: McIntyre J. (paras. 25-29), joined by Chouinard J.
- Dickson C.J. and Beetz J. took no part in the consideration or decision of the case.

Laws applied
- R. v. Therens, [1985] 1 S.C.R. 613; Korponay v. Attorney General of Canada, [1982] 1 S.C.R. 41

Clarkson v R, [1986] 1 S.C.R. 383 is a leading Supreme Court of Canada decision on the right to retain and instruct counsel under section 10(b) of the Canadian Charter of Rights and Freedoms. The Court held that in order for an accused to waive their right to retain and instruct counsel, they must be clear and unequivocal, and the accused must be aware of the consequences of the waiver.

== Background ==
On December 8, 1982, Lana Louise Clarkson, in an intoxicated state, called to her sister to tell her that her husband, Mr. Clarkson, had been shot. Several members of the family came over to find Clarkson in a hysterical state. Her husband was in the living room slumped in a chair with a bullet hole in his head.

When the police arrived, they arrested Clarkson, informed her of her right to retain and instruct counsel, and then charged her with the murder of Mr. Clarkson. Clarkson was taken to the hospital along with her aunt, Lorna Estey. Along the way, the police overheard Clarkson make several inculpatory statements to her aunt.

Afterwards, the police took Clarkson to the station where she was informed of her rights again. However, she refused to contact a lawyer. During interrogation, Estey was present and made several attempts to stop Clarkson from answering and insisted that she get a lawyer. Nevertheless, Clarkson made several incriminating statements.

At trial, the court found that the statements were made in violation of section 10(b) and excluded under section 24(2) of the Charter. On appeal, the decision was overturned, and Clarkson was convicted.

The issue before the Supreme Court was whether the police violated her rights under section 10(b) and if so whether the statements should be excluded under section 24(2).

== Opinion of the Court ==
Justice Wilson, writing for the majority, held that the trial judge was correct, and that Clarkson should be acquitted.

Wilson noted that in order for a waiver of right to counsel to be valid, it "must be premised on a true appreciation of the consequences of giving up that right." She identified the purpose of the right is to ensure that the accused will be treated fairly.

She proposed that an accused must satisfy an "awareness of the consequences test" to properly waive their rights. On the facts, there was evidence that due to her intoxication, Clarkson was not entirely aware of the consequences of her waiver. The police, in their questioning, violated 10(b) and the statements should be excluded under section 24(2).

== See also ==
- List of Supreme Court of Canada cases (Dickson Court)
