= R v Skinner =

- Supreme Court of Canada

Hearing: December 1, 2, 1988 Judgment: May 31, 1990
- Full case name: Dorman Thomas Skinner v Her Majesty The Queen
- Citations: [1990] 1 SCR 1235
- Docket No.: 20428
- Ruling: Skinner appeal allowed

Court membership
- Chief Justice: Brian Dickson; Puisne Justices: Jean Beetz, William McIntyre, Antonio Lamer, Bertha Wilson, Gerald Le Dain, Gérard La Forest, Claire L'Heureux-Dubé, John Sopinka

Reasons given
- Majority: Dickson CJ, joined by La Forest and Sopinka JJ
- Concurrence: Lamer J
- Dissent: Wilson J, joined by L'Heureux-Dubé J

Laws applied
- Reference Re ss 193 and 195.1(1)(c) of the Criminal Code (Man), [1990] 1 SCR 000

R v Skinner, [1990] 1 SCR 1235, is a leading constitutional decision of the Supreme Court of Canada on the freedom of expression under section 2(b) of the Canadian Charter of Rights and Freedoms ("Charter").

== Background ==
Dorman Skinner was arrested while trying to proposition an undercover police officer. He was charged with "communicating in a public place for the purpose of obtaining the sexual services of a prostitute" contrary to section 195.1(1)(c) of the Criminal Code. He was convicted at trial. On appeal, Skinner argued the provision of the Criminal Code violated his right to freedom of expression under section 2(b) of the Charter. The Court of Appeal agreed and found a violation that could not be saved under section 1 of the Charter. It was also suggested the provision may also violate the right to freedom of association under section 2(d) of the Charter.

The issues before the Supreme Court was whether section 195.1(1)(c) of the Criminal Code violated sections 2(b) and 2(d) of the Charter, and if so, whether the provision was justifiable under section 1 of the Charter.

In a 4–2 decision, the Court overturned the ruling of the Court of Appeal. It held that the provision violated section 2(b) but was saved under section 1, and did not violate section 2(d).

== Decision of the Court ==
=== Majority ===
The majority reasons were written by Chief Justice Brian Dickson. He first found that section 195.1(1)(c) did not violate freedom of association. He stated that the law targets expressive content alone and does not relate to association. The provision does not depend on whether there was an agreement for exchange between consenting individual. Though the law may prevent communication for certain commercial activities it is not sufficient to invoke the freedom of association.

In considering the freedom of expression under section 2(b) of the Charter, Dickson applies the same reasoning from the earlier Reference Re ss 193 and 195.1(1)(c) of the Criminal Code (Man), which found that section 195.1(1)(c) of the Criminal Code violated the freedom of expression but was saved under section 1.

=== Dissent ===
Justice Bertha Wilson, supported by Claire L'Heureux-Dubé, dissented. She, unlike Dickson, pointed to the Criminal Code reference decision.

== See also ==
- List of Supreme Court of Canada cases (Dickson Court)
