= Edmonton Journal v Alberta (AG) =

- Supreme Court of Canada

Hearing: 3 March 1989 Judgment: 21 December 1989
- Full case name: Edmonton Journal, a division of Southam Inc v The Attorney General for Alberta and the Attorney General of Canada
- Citations: [1989] 2 SCR 1326
- Docket No.: 20608
- Prior history: APPEAL from Edmonton Journal v Alberta (AG), 1987 ABCA 147 (17 July 1987), upholding Edmonton Journal v Alberta (AG), 1985 CanLII 1233 (20 September 1985)
- Ruling: Appeal allowed

Court membership
- Chief Justice: Brian Dickson; Puisne Justices: William McIntyre, Antonio Lamer, Bertha Wilson, Gérard La Forest, Claire L'Heureux-Dubé, John Sopinka, Charles Gonthier, Peter Cory

Reasons given
- Majority: Cory J, joined by Dickson CJ and Lamer J
- Concurrence: Wilson J
- Concur/dissent: La Forest J, joined by L'Heureux-Dubé and Sopinka JJ
- McIntrye and Gonthier JJ took no part in the consideration or decision of the case.

Edmonton Journal v Alberta (AG), [1989] 2 S.C.R. 1326 is a leading freedom of the press case decided by the Supreme Court of Canada. The Court held that publication restrictions on matrimonial proceedings, section 30(1) of Alberta's Judicature Act, and on pre-trial stages of civil actions, section 30(2) of said Act, were in violation of freedom of expression rights under section 2(b) of the Canadian Charter of Rights and Freedoms and could not be saved under section 1.

== See also ==
- List of Supreme Court of Canada cases (Dickson Court)
- Edmonton Journal
