= Robichaud v Canada (Treasury Board) =

Judgment of the Supreme Court of Canada

- Supreme Court of Canada

Hearing: May 6, 1987 Judgment: July 29, 1987
- Citations: [1987] 2 SCR 84, 1987 CanLII 73 (SCC)
- Docket No.: 19326

Holding
- A corporation can be held liable for the discriminatory conduct of its employees acting "in the course of their employment" and that the employer is in the best position to remedy such conduct.

Court membership
- Chief Justice: Brian Dickson; Puisne Justices: Jean Beetz, Willard Estey, William McIntyre, Antonio Lamer, Bertha Wilson, Gerald Le Dain, Gérard La Forest, Claire L'Heureux-Dubé

Reasons given
- Majority: La Forest (Dickson, McIntyre, Lamer, Wilson, and L'Heureux‑Dubé concurring)
- Concurrence: Le Dain
- Beetz, Estey took no part in the consideration or decision of the case.

Laws applied
- Canadian Human Rights Act

Robichaud v Canada (Treasury Board), [1987] 2 S.C.R. 84 is a decision by the Supreme Court of Canada on sexual harassment under the Canadian Human Rights Act. The Court found that a corporation can be found liable for the discriminatory conduct of its employees who are acting "in the course of their employment." It also found it necessary to impose liability, as the employer is the only one in a position to remedy the discriminatory conduct and "provide the most important remedy‑‑a healthy work environment".

== See also ==
- Human rights in Canada
- Strathclyde Regional Council v Porcelli
