= R v Strachan =

- Supreme Court of Canada

Hearing: January 28, 29, 1988 Judgment: December 15, 1988
- Full case name: Joseph Colin Strachan v Her Majesty The Queen
- Citations: [1988] 2 S.C.R. 980
- Ruling: Strachan's appeal was dismissed.

Court membership
- Chief Justice: Brian Dickson; Puisne Justices: Jean Beetz, Willard Estey, William McIntyre, Antonio Lamer, Bertha Wilson, Gerald Le Dain, Gérard La Forest, Claire L'Heureux-Dubé

Reasons given
- Majority: Dickson C.J., joined by Beetz, McIntyre, La Forest and L'Heureux‑Dubé JJ.
- Concurrence: Lamer J.
- Concurrence: Wilson J.
- Estey and Le Dain JJ. took no part in the consideration or decision of the case.

Laws applied
- R. v. Collins, [1987] 1 S.C.R. 265

R v Strachan, [1988] 2 S.C.R. 980 is a leading Supreme Court of Canada decision on the exclusion of evidence under section 24(2) of the Canadian Charter of Rights and Freedoms subsequent to a violation of a Charter right. The Court held that there does not need to be a causal connection between the violation and the evidence, but rather there need only be a temporal link between the two.

== Background ==
Joseph Strachan was under investigation by the Royal Canadian Mounted Police for drug related offences. A warrant was obtained under section 10(2) of the Narcotic Control Act to search his apartment. The police arrive at his apartment and found him with two other men, along with a substantial amount of drugs and money. All three men were arrested and read their rights. Upon arrest the officer in charge denied Strachan's attempt to use the phone to contact a lawyer on the basis that he still needed to get "matters under control". The officer later testified at trial that he intended to first question the suspects and find guns that were suspected of being there before he would allow them to call a lawyer. Strachan was finally allowed to contact his lawyer from the police station an hour and forty minutes after the arrest.

At trial, it was held that Strachan's right to counsel, under section 10(b) of the Charter, was violated, that the evidence must be excluded under section 24(2) of the Charter, and that Strachan be acquitted.

On appeal, it was held that Strachan's right to counsel was violated but the evidence should not be excluded as there was no causal connection between the violation and evidence collected. A new trial was ordered.

The issue before the Supreme Court was whether there was a violation of Strachan's right against unreasonable search and seizure under section 8 of the Charter and whether the evidence should be excluded under section 24(2) of the Charter.

== Reasons of the court ==
Chief Justice Dickson, writing for the majority of the Court, held that there was no violation of section 8 and the evidence should not be excluded under section 24(2) of the Charter.

Justice Lamer wrote his own separate concurring reasons.

Justice Wilson wrote separate reasons finding that there was a violation of section 8 but agreed with the rest of the Court that the evidence should not be excluded under section 24(2).

== See also ==
- List of Supreme Court of Canada cases (Dickson Court)
