= Ford v Quebec (AG) =

- Supreme Court of Canada

Hearing: November 16–18, 1987 Judgment: December 15, 1988
- Full case name: The Attorney General of Quebec v. La Chaussure Brown's Inc., Valerie Ford, McKenna Inc., Nettoyeur et Tailleur Masson Inc. and La Compagnie de Fromage Nationale Ltée
- Citations: [1988] 2 SCR 712
- Docket No.: 20306
- Prior history: Judgement against the Attorney General of Quebec by the Court of Appeal for Quebec
- Ruling: Appeal dismissed.

Court membership
- Chief Justice: Brian Dickson; Puisne Justices: Jean Beetz, Willard Estey, William McIntyre, Antonio Lamer, Bertha Wilson, Gerald Le Dain, Gérard La Forest, Claire L'Heureux-Dubé

Reasons given
- Unanimous reasons by: The Court
- Estey and Le Dain JJ. took no part in the consideration or decision of the case.

Laws applied
- Forget v Quebec (AG), [1988] 2 SCR 90

Ford v Quebec (AG), [1988] 2 SCR 712 is a landmark Supreme Court of Canada decision in which the Court struck down part of the Charter of the French Language, commonly known as "Bill 101". This law had prohibited the use of commercial signs written in languages other than French and required businesses to use only the French versions of their names. The court ruled that Bill 101 violated the freedom of expression as guaranteed in the Canadian Charter of Rights and Freedoms.

== Background ==
The appeal, launched by the government of Quebec, consolidated many cases initiated by Montreal-area merchants such as Montreal florist Hyman Singer and West Island wool shop owner Valerie Ford. Following complaints, the Office québécois de la langue française had instructed them to inform and serve their customers in French and replace their bilingual French and English signs with unilingual French ones. They had been fined for violation of the Charter of the French Language and decided to fight the case in court with the backing of Alliance Quebec. The Supreme Court of Canada upheld the decisions of the Quebec Superior Court and the Quebec Court of Appeal.

== Aftermath ==
In late 1989, shortly after the Supreme Court's decision, Premier of Quebec Robert Bourassa's Liberal Party of Quebec government passed Bill 178, making minor amendments to the Charter of the French Language. Recognizing that the amendments did not follow the Supreme Court's ruling, the provincial legislature invoked section 33 of the Canadian Charter of Rights and Freedoms (also known as the notwithstanding clause) to shield Bill 178 from review by courts for five years.

This move was politically controversial, both among Quebec nationalists, who were unhappy with the changes to the Charter of the French Language; and among English-speaking Quebecers, who opposed the use of the notwithstanding clause. Tension over this issue was a contributing factor to the failure of the Meech Lake Accord, among other political repercussions.

The law was challenged under International Covenant on Civil and Political Rights. The Human Rights Committee found a violation of article 19 which guarantees right to opinion and freedom of expression. The State was ordered to remedy the violation by an amendment to the law.

In 1993, the Charter of the French Language was amended in the manner suggested by the Supreme Court of Canada. Bill 86 was enacted by the Bourassa government to amend the Charter. It now states that French must be predominant on commercial signs, but a language other than French may also be used. Accordingly, the law no longer invokes the notwithstanding clause.

== See also ==
- List of Supreme Court of Canada cases (Dickson Court)
- Demolinguistics of Quebec
