= R v Duarte =

- Supreme Court of Canada

Hearing: October 4, 5, 1989 Judgment: January 25, 1990
- Full case name: Mario Duarte v Her Majesty The Queen
- Citations: [1990] 1 SCR 30
- Prior history: appeal from the Court of Appeal for Ontario
- Ruling: Duarte appeal dismissed

Court membership
- Chief Justice: Brian Dickson; Puisne Justices: Antonio Lamer, Bertha Wilson, Gérard La Forest, Claire L'Heureux-Dubé, John Sopinka, Charles Gonthier, Peter Cory, Beverley McLachlin

Reasons given
- Majority: La Forest J, joined by Dickson CJ and L'Heureux‑Dubé, Sopinka, Gonthier and McLachlin JJ
- Concurrence: Lamer J

R v Duarte, [1990] 1 SCR 30 is a leading case decided by the Supreme Court of Canada on the right to privacy under section 8 of the Canadian Charter of Rights and Freedoms ("Charter"). The Court held that a warrantless and surreptitious video recording of private communications violated section 8. Consent of only one party to a conversation is insufficient to be reasonable.

== Background ==
Mario Duarte was under investigation by the police for drug-related offences. An undercover officer arranged a meeting with Duarte in a rented apartment room where the police had set up a video camera. He challenged the constitutionality of the provision allowing for the recording. The trial judge agreed. The Crown appealed.

In a decision by Cory JA, the Court of Appeal for Ontario found that the video camera did not violate the reasonable expectation of privacy, as a camera was analogized to an extension of memory. Cory saw this as a "small step" beyond the use of human recall, and relied upon the older American cases of United States v White and Lopez v United States.

== Reasons of the court ==
La Forest J, for the majority, found that the surreptitious monitoring by law enforcement constituted an unreasonable search. He characterized the issue as a balance between the right to privacy and the right "of the state to intrude on privacy in the furtherance of its responsibilities for law enforcement".

In the current circumstances, La Forest argued that the expectation of privacy should be determined based on whether "the person whose words were recorded spoke in circumstances in which it was reasonable for that person to expect that his or her words would only be heard by the person he or she was addressing".

== Aftermath ==
In response to this decision, the Parliament of Canada amended the Criminal Code to include provisions on electronic interception of communications, which included judicial authorization where consent is not available, "number recorder warrants" and "tracking warrants".
