= Hunter Engineering Co v Syncrude Canada Ltd =

- Supreme Court of Canada

Hearing: February 25, 26, 1988 Judgment: March 23, 1989
- Citations: [1989] 1 S.C.R. 426
- Docket No.: 19773
- Ruling: Appeal dismissed

Court membership
- Chief Justice: Brian Dickson; Puisne Justices: William McIntyre, Antonio Lamer, Bertha Wilson, Gérard La Forest, Claire L'Heureux-Dubé, John Sopinka, Charles Gonthier, Peter Cory

Reasons given
- Majority: Dickson C.J., joined by La Forest J.
- Concurrence: McIntyre J.
- Dissent: Wilson J., joined by L'Heureux-Dube J.
- Estey and Le Dain JJ. took no part in the consideration or decision of the case.

Hunter Engineering Co v Syncrude Canada Ltd, [1989] 1 S.C.R. 426 is a leading commercial contract decision of the Supreme Court of Canada. The Court unanimously found that the companies that sold Syncrude faulty gear boxes were not liable for their poor design, however, the Court was divided on the test to determine when a fundamental breach could void a contract.

The Court held that the limitation of liability clause was enforceable even in the case of a fundamental breach so long as it was clear in the language that it was within the intentions of the parties.

== Background ==
Syncrude Canada Ltd. contracted with Hunter Engineering and Allis-Chalmers to design gear boxes. Due to design flaws, the boxes were not usable for their intended purpose. Syncrude spent over $1 million to repair the boxes. Hunter sought protection under a limitation of liability clause within the contract.

== Judgment of the Court ==
There were three separate reasons given.

Chief Justice Dickson, with La Forest J., found that the limitation clause was valid. He argued that the doctrine of fundamental breach is not appropriate. Instead, the issue should only be dealt with as a matter of contractual unconscionability such as where parties have unequal bargaining power.

Justice Wilson, with Justice L'Heureux-Dube, argued that the limitation clause could be invalidated in certain circumstances. Wilson proposed that a contract could be struck out for fundamental breach where the conduct of one party deprives the other party of "substantially the whole benefit" of the contract.

Justice McIntyre, writing briefly for himself alone, agreed with Wilson on a number of findings based on the facts, but refused to deal with the issue of fundamental breach.

== See also ==
- List of Supreme Court of Canada cases
