= Reference Re Senate Reform =

- Supreme Court of Canada

Hearing: 14 November 2013 Judgment: 25 April 2014
- Full case name: IN THE MATTER OF a Reference by the Governor in Council concerning reform of the Senate, as set out in Order in Council P.C. 2013-70, dated February 1, 2013
- Citations: 2014 SCC 32
- Docket No.: 35203

Holding
- Term limits and consultative elections for the Senate cannot be implemented by Parliament alone, but requires approval via the 7/50 amending formula; abolishing the Senate requires unanimous consent of all provinces

Court membership
- Chief Justice: Beverley McLachlin; Puisne Justices: Louis LeBel, Rosalie Abella, Marshall Rothstein, Thomas Cromwell, Michael Moldaver, Andromache Karakatsanis, Richard Wagner

Reasons given
- Unanimous reasons by: The Court

Reference Re Senate Reform [2014] 1 S.C.R. 704, 2014 SCC 32 was a reference question to the Supreme Court of Canada regarding the constitutional validity of proposals to change the Senate, such as term limits, consultative elections, and abolition. The ruling was announced April 2014, following arguments made in November 2013. The court decided that term limits and consultative elections could not be done by the Federal Government alone through Parliament, but also required the consent of seven provinces representing more than 50% of the population, in accordance with the lower of two thresholds for the constitutional amending formula. The court also ruled that Senate abolition would require the higher threshold for amendment: Parliamentary approval plus consent of all ten provinces.

== See also ==
- List of Supreme Court of Canada cases (McLachlin Court)
