= R v Vaillancourt =

- Supreme Court of Canada

Hearing: December 10, 1986 Judgment: December 3, 1987
- Full case name: Yvan Vaillancourt v Her Majesty The Queen
- Citations: [1987] 2 S.C.R. 636
- Docket No.: 18963

Court membership
- Chief Justice: Dickson
- Puisne Justices: Beetz, Estey, McIntyre, Chouinard*, Lamer, Wilson, Le Dain and La Forest JJ. (*)Chouinard took no part in judgment

Reasons given
- Majority: Lamer J. (paras. 1-43), joined by Dickson, Estey, Wilson J.
- Concurrence: Beetz J. (paras. 44-46), joined by Le Dain J.
- Dissent: McIntyre J. (paras. 47-54)

R v Vaillancourt, [1987] 2 S.C.R. 636, is a case from the Supreme Court of Canada on the constitutionality of the Criminal Code concept of "constructive murder". The Court raised the possibility that crimes with significant "stigma" attached, such as murder, require proof of the mens rea element of subjective foresight of death, but declined to decide on that basis. Instead, they concluded that all crimes require proof of at least objective fault, that the particular provision at issue here did not meet that requirement, and therefore that provision of the Criminal Code for constructive murder was unconstitutional.

== Background ==
Yvan Vaillancourt and a friend planned to rob a local pool hall. Before the robbery they had agreed to only use knives. However, when his friend showed up for the robbery with a gun Vaillancourt made him take the bullets out and place them in his glove. Immediately after the robbery took place, Vaillancourt saw his friend go back into the hall where a fight broke out between his friend and a customer. In the struggle, the customer was shot with his friend's gun and later died of his wounds. Vaillancourt was caught by the police at the scene but his accomplice got away.

Vaillancourt was charged with murder under s. 213(d) (now repealed) of the Criminal Code because he was considered an accomplice by operation under s.21(2) of the Code. Under s.213(d), a person using a weapon resulting in death while committing a robbery was guilty of murder, regardless of whether death was intended or of knowledge that death was likely to occur. He was convicted by a jury at trial, and the conviction was upheld by the Quebec Court of Appeal.

The issue before the court was whether s.213(d) violated either s.7 or s.11(d) of the Charter.

Vaillancourt argued that it was a principle of fundamental justice that no accused should be liable for an offence without showing some degree of subjective mens rea.

== Reasons of the majority ==
The majority was written by Lamer J. with Dickson, Estey, and Wilson JJ. concurring.

The majority looked at the elements of the offence as well as the punishment that accompanies it. Punishment for murder was an automatic life sentence which produced a "stigma" upon the offender. Justice Lamer offered as his own opinion the view that because the moral blameworthiness of an accused must be proportional to the punishment and stigma of the offence, there were certain offences, such as murder, where there must be proof beyond a reasonable doubt of subjective foresight. However, it was not necessary to decide that point, because it had already been settled that no conviction for any offence could occur without proof of at least objective foresight.

The majority modified Vaillancourt's argument to recognize that the provision did not even require an objective fault element, which the majority recognized to be a principle of fundamental justice. Thus, since s.213(d) did not require any foresight of death it was in violation of a principle of fundamental justice and so violated s. 7 of the Charter, and could not be saved under s.1.

The suggestion that high punishment/high stigma offences must have subjective fault was later adopted by a majority of the Court in R. v. Martineau, [1990] 2 SCR 633.

== See also ==
- List of Supreme Court of Canada cases (Dickson Court)
- Felony murder
