= Rocket v Royal College of Dental Surgeons of Ontario =

Judgement of the Supreme Court of Canada

Rocket v Royal College of Dental Surgeons of Ontario, [1990] 2 S.C.R. 232 is a leading constitutional decision of the Supreme Court of Canada on the right to freedom of expression under section 2(b) of the Canadian Charter of Rights and Freedoms. The Court struck down a law prohibiting professionals from advertising as it was too broad.

Dr. Rocket and Dr. Price were dentists practising in Ontario. They started an advertisement campaign to promote their practice. They were charged with violating the prohibition of advertising under the Health Disciplines Act.

Justice McLachlin, writing for a unanimous Court, held that the Act violated section 2(b) of the Charter and it could not be saved under section 1 of the Charter. Consequently, the law must be struck down.

== See also ==
- List of Supreme Court of Canada cases (Dickson Court)
