= By the Court decisions of the Supreme Court of Canada =

Justices of the Supreme Court of Canada have the option of releasing reasons for a unanimous decision without individual attribution by simply attributing the judgment to "The Court".

The practice began around 1979 by Chief Justice Bora Laskin, borrowing from the US Supreme Court practice of anonymizing certain unanimous decisions. Unlike in the US, which uses it primarily for uncontroversial cases, in Canada, it is used almost always for important and controversial cases.

It has been suggested that the practice has been used to give greater authority to the decision by having the entire court speak as a single voice.

Peter McCormick, a professor of political science at the University of Lethbridge who studies Canada's appellate courts states that there were 9 reported by the court decisions prior to Laskin's term as Chief Justice of Canada, 15 reported such decisions under Laskin's chief justiceship, and 51 reported such decisions under Brian Dickson's chief justiceship.

== List ==
The following is a list of anonymous decisions that are attributed to "The Court":

Case name	Citation	Subject
Quebec (AG) v Blaikie (No 1)	[1979] 2 SCR 1016	Minority language rights
Quebec (AG) v Blaikie (No 2)	[1981] 1 SCR 312	Language of delegated legislation
Quebec (AG) v Quebec Assn of Protestant School Boards	[1984] 2 SCR 66	Minority language education rights
Reference Re Manitoba Language Rights	[1985] 1 SCR 721	Language rights
R v Baig	[1987] 2 SCR 537	Right to counsel
Ford v Quebec (AG)	[1988] 2 SCR 712	Commercial freedom of expression
Devine v Quebec (AG)	[1988] 2 SCR 790	Freedom of expression, French language legislation
Tremblay v Daigle	[1989] 2 SCR 530	Abortion
Reference Re Milgaard	[1992] 1 SCR 866	Wrongful conviction - murder
Reference Re Secession of Quebec	[1998] 2 SCR 217	Secession
Del Zotto v Canada	[1999] 1 SCR 3	
Quebec (Deputy Minister of Revenue) v Nolisair International Inc (Trustee of); Sécurité Saglac (1992) Inc (Trustee of) v Quebec (Deputy Minister of Revenue)	[1999] 1 SCR 759	
R v Marshall	[1999] 3 SCR 533	Aboriginal fishing rights
Reference Re Firearms Act	[2000] 1 SCR 783	Gun control
R v Latimer	[2001] 1 SCR 3	Cruel and unusual punishment, mercy killings
Smith v Canada (AG)	2001 SCC 88	
Privacy Act (Can) (Re)	2001 SCC 89	
R v Larivière	2001 SCC 93	
United States v Burns	2001 SCC 7	Extradition and execution
Suresh v Canada (Minister of Citizenship and Immigration)	2002 SCC 1	Torture
Ahani v Canada (Minister of Citizenship and Immigration)	2002 SCC 2	Torture
R v Powley	2003 SCC 43	Métis hunting rights
R v Blais	2003 SCC 44	Métis hunting rights
Reference Re Same-Sex Marriage	2004 SCC 79	Same-sex marriage
R v RGL	2005 SCC 18	
Solski (Tutor of) v Quebec (AG)	2005 SCC 14	
Gosselin (Tutor of) v Quebec (AG)	2005 SCC 15	
Okwuobi v Lester B Pearson School Board	2005 SCC 16	
Provincial Court Judges' Assn of New Brunswick v New Brunswick (Minister of Justice)	2005 SCC 44	Judicial independence
R v Rodrigue	2005 SCC 67	
Forum des maires de la Péninsule acadienne v Canada (Food Inspection Agency)	2005 SCC 85	
R v Hazout	2006 SCC 42	
BCE Inc v 1976 Debentureholders	2008 SCC 69	Nature of the duties of corporate directors in Canadian law.
R v Ahmad	2011 SCC 6	Whether Parliament's decision to limit superior courts from determining questions of disclosure of information pertaining to international relations, national defence or national security invades the core jurisdiction of superior courts
Reference Re Securities Act	2011 SCC 66	Constitutionality of a proposed federal securities regulator.
Reference Re Broadcasting Act	2012 SCC 4	Whether Internet service providers are "broadcasters" when providing access to broadcasting through Internet
Momentous.ca Corp v Canadian American Association of Professional Baseball Ltd	2012 SCC 9	Conflict of laws
Fundy Settlement v Canada	2012 SCC 14	Taxation and trusts
Canada (AG) v Kane	2012 SCC 64	Standard of review of Public Service Staffing Tribunal decision
Construction Labour Relations v Driver Iron Inc	2012 SCC 65	Judicial review of Alberta Labour Relations Board decision
R v Mailhot	2013 SCC 17	Fairness of charge to jury.
R v Ibanescu	2013 SCC 31	Admissibility of straddle evidence
Reference re Senate Reform	2014 SCC 32	Whether Parliament can unilaterally set fixed terms for Senators — Whether Parliament can unilaterally implement framework for consultative elections for appointments to Senate — Whether Parliament can unilaterally repeal ss. 23(3) and 23(4) of Constitution Act, 1867 requiring that Senators must own land worth $4,000 in province for which they are appointed and have net worth of at least $4,000 — Whether constitutional amendment abolishing Senate may be accomplished by general amending procedure or whether unanimous consent procedure applies
Carter v Canada (AG)	2015 SCC 5	Physician-assisted suicide.
R v Goleski	2015 SCC 6	Burden of proof of proving an "excuse" under s. 794(2) of the Criminal Code
Zurich Insurance Co v Chubb Insurance Co of Canada	2015 SCC 19	Whether specific insurance company is an "insurer" for the purposes of Ontario statutory accident benefits scheme
Caplin v Canada (Justice)	2015 SCC 32	Whether Minister of Justice's surrender via extradition of an accused charged with murder was reasonable
Canada (AG) v Barnaby	2015 SCC 31	Whether Minister of Justice's surrender via extradition of an accused charged with murder was reasonable; Whether extraditing the accused to possibly be subjected to a fourth trial would be contrary to the principles of fundamental justice under s. 7 of the Charter
R v Smith	2015 SCC 34	Whether regulations limiting the lawful possession of medical marijuana to dried forms infringe the right to life, liberty and security of the prison under s. 7 of the Charter; Whether accused has standing to challenge the constitutional validity of provisions under the Controlled Drugs and Substances Act
R v Cody	2017 SCC 31	Unreasonable delay.
R v Comeau	2018 SCC 15	Interprovincial Trade.
Reference re An Act respecting First Nations, Inuit and Métis children, youth and families	2024 SCC 5	Whether Parliament enacting a statute establishing national standards to protect Indigenous children and affirming Indigenous peoples’ inherent right of self‑government in relation to child and family services is ultra vires.

== See also ==
- Per curiam decision
