= Slaight Communications Inc v Davidson =

Judgement of the Supreme Court of Canada

Slaight Communications Inc v Davidson, [1989] 1 S.C.R. 1038 is a leading decision of the Supreme Court of Canada on the right to freedom of expression under section 2(b) of the Canadian Charter of Rights and Freedoms and the Charter's relationship with administrative law. The Court upheld an order given by the Labour Relations Board that required an employer to give an employee a letter of recommendation containing information such as sales quotas, but could not divulge any further information regarding the employee's performance.

== Background ==
Ron Davidson was employed by Slaight Communications as a "radio time salesman" for three years. He was dismissed due to inadequate performance. Davidson filed a complaint under the Canada Labour Code for unjust dismissal. The Labour Board found he was unjustly dismissed and ordered Slaight to write a reference letter stating that he had been employed by the radio station, the sales quotas he had been set and the amount of sales he actually made during this period, and that an adjudicator had held that he was unjustly dismissed.

== Ruling of the Court ==
Chief Justice Dickson, writing for the majority, dismissed the appeal. He held that the order violated s.2(b) of the Charter but it was saved under s. 1.
