= R v Therens =

Supreme Court of Canada decision

- Court: Supreme Court of Canada
- Decided: [1985] 1 S.C.R. 613
- Citation: [1985] 1 S.C.R. 613

Case opinions
- When a person was detained for the purpose of giving a breath sample under section 235(1) of the Criminal Code, they have the right to consult counsel. Failure to allow this violates the accused's right to retain counsel.

R v Therens [1985] 1 S.C.R. 613 is an early Supreme Court of Canada decision on an accused's right to retain and instruct counsel without delay under section 10(b) of the Canadian Charter of Rights and Freedoms. The Court held that when a person was detained for the purpose of giving a breath sample under section 235(1) of the Criminal Code, they have the right to consult counsel. Since the police did not allow the accused to do so, they violated the accused's right to retain counsel. The Court ruled that the evidence was properly excluded.

== Background ==
Therens had been driving drunk and collided with a tree. At the scene of the accident a police officer made a demand for a breath sample for analysis and required Therens to accompany the office to the police station to take a breathalyzer test. As a result of the test, he was charged with driving with a blood alcohol level above 80 milligrams of alcohol in 100 millilitres of blood.

At trial, Therens applied to have the evidence of the breathalyzer excluded. He argued that the failure of the police to allow him to consult counsel at the police station infringed his right to be informed, upon arrest or detention, of his right to retain and instruct counsel without delay, as guaranteed by under section 10(b) of the Charter. The evidence therefore should be excluded under section 24(2) of the Charter.

The trial judge accepted that argument, excluded the evidence, and acquitted. The Saskatchewan Court of Appeal upheld the acquittal. The Crown then appealed to the Supreme Court of Canada.

== Decision ==
The Supreme Court observed that detention can arise from a reasonable perception of the detainee, stating “most citizens are not aware of the precise limits of police authority“. It is reasonable that a person could “assume lawful authority and comply with the demand“ believing it to be a detention. Since Therens was detained, the police were required under s. 10(b) to permit him to consult counsel. Failing to do so was a breach of his right to counsel, warranting exclusion of the breathalyzer certificate under s. 24(2).
