= Gerald Le Dain =

Former judge of the Supreme Court of Canada

Gerald Eric Le Dain

Puisne Justice of the Supreme Court of Canada
- In office May 29, 1984 – November 30, 1988
- Nominated by: Pierre Trudeau
- Preceded by: Brian Dickson
- Succeeded by: Peter Cory

Personal details
- Born: November 27, 1924 Montreal, Quebec
- Died: December 18, 2007 (aged 83) Ottawa, Ontario
- Spouse: Cynthia Le Dain
- Children: 6

Military service
- Allegiance: Canadian Army
- Branch/service: Royal Regiment of Canadian Artillery

Gerald Eric Le Dain, CC (November 27, 1924 – December 18, 2007) was a Canadian lawyer and judge, who sat on the Supreme Court of Canada from 1984 to 1988.

== Life and education ==
Born in Montreal, Quebec, the son of Eric George Bryant Le Dain and Antoinette Louise Whithard, he served during World War II as an artilleryman with the Royal Regiment of Canadian Artillery. He received a B.C.L from McGill University and was called to the Quebec Bar in 1949. He then studied at the University of Lyon in France, receiving a Docteur de l'Université degree in 1950.

== Legal career ==
Gerald Le Dain practised law with Walker, Martineau, Chauvin, Walker & Allison from 1950 to 1953. He received a doctorate from the University of Lyon in 1950. He taught law at McGill University from 1953 to 1959 and again from 1966 to 1967. He also worked in the Legal Department for the Canadian International Paper Co. (1959–1961). He became Partner of Riel, Le Dain, Bissonnette Vermette & Ryan from 1961 to 1966, now known as Dunton Rainville.

He was dean of Osgoode Hall Law School from 1967 to 1972. From 1969 to 1973, he was the chairman of the Commission of Inquiry into the Non-Medical Use of Drugs (also known as the Le Dain Commission), which recommended that cannabis be removed from the narcotic control act and be regulated provincially. In 1975, he was appointed to the Federal Court of Appeal and the Court Martial Appeal Court.

== Supreme Court ==
In 1984 Le Dain was appointed to the Supreme Court of Canada. In November 1988, he resigned from the bench after hospitalization for depression, presumably from overwork. A 2017 CBC Radio documentary stated that Le Dain resigned under pressure from the chief justice, Brian Dickson, due to the view at the time that a person suffering from depression could not fulfill the role of a justice. Former justice Claire L'Heureux-Dubé said of the situation: "Justice Le Dain, being an exceptional mind and very great for the court, should have been given the time to get back healthy. And we thought that wouldn't be that long. Being forced to resign in such a position, it must have been terrible."

== Death ==
Le Dain died December 18, 2007, in Ottawa, Ontario. His memorial service was held on December 28, 2007, at Christ Church Cathedral in Ottawa.

== Awards ==
In 1976, he received an honorary doctorate from Concordia University. In 1989, he was made a Companion of the Order of Canada.

== See also ==
- 1987 judgments of the Supreme Court of Canada
- 1988 judgments of the Supreme Court of Canada
