= William McIntyre (judge) =

Judge of the Supreme Court of Canada (1918–2009)

William Rogers McIntyre CC

Puisne Justice of the Supreme Court of Canada
- In office January 1, 1979 – February 15, 1989
- Nominated by: Pierre Trudeau
- Preceded by: Wishart Spence
- Succeeded by: Beverley McLachlin

Personal details
- Born: March 15, 1918 Lachine, Quebec
- Died: June 14, 2009 (aged 91) Victoria, British Columbia
- Education: University of Saskatchewan
- Awards: Order of Canada

William Rogers McIntyre, CC (March 15, 1918 – June 14, 2009) was a Canadian Puisne Justice of the Supreme Court of Canada.

Born in Lachine, Quebec, the son of Charles Sidney McIntyre and Pauline May Sifton, he moved with his family to Moose Jaw, Saskatchewan when he was young. In 1939, he received a Bachelor of Arts degree from the University of Saskatchewan. After serving during World War II, he received his Bachelor of Laws in 1946 from University of Saskatchewan.

In 1947, he was called to the Bars of Saskatchewan and British Columbia and practised law in Victoria, British Columbia.

In 1967, he was appointed to the Supreme Court of British Columbia and elevated to the British Columbia Court of Appeal in 1973. In 1979, he was appointed to the Supreme Court of Canada and retired in 1989. In 1991, he was made a Companion of the Order of Canada.

== Death ==
McIntyre died in Victoria, British Columbia from throat cancer, aged 91, on June 14, 2009.

== See also ==
- 1987 judgments of the Supreme Court of Canada
- 1988 judgments of the Supreme Court of Canada
- 1989 judgments of the Supreme Court of Canada
