= Bertha Wilson =

First woman judge on Supreme Court of Canada

Puisne Justice of the Supreme Court of Canada
- In office March 4, 1982 – January 4, 1991
- Nominated by: Pierre Trudeau
- Preceded by: Ronald Martland
- Succeeded by: Frank Iacobucci

Personal details
- Born: Bertha Wernham; September 18, 1923 Kirkcaldy, Fife, Scotland
- Died: April 28, 2007 (aged 83) Ottawa, Ontario, Canada
- Spouse: John Wilson (m. 1945)
- Education: University of Aberdeen; Dalhousie Law School

Bertha Wernham Wilson CC FRSC (September 18, 1923 – April 28, 2007) was a Canadian jurist and the first female puisne justice of the Supreme Court of Canada. Before her ascension to Canada's highest court, she was the first female associate and partner at Osler, Hoskin & Harcourt and the first woman appointed to the Court of Appeal for Ontario. During her time at Osler, she created the first in-firm research department in the Canadian legal industry.

== Early life ==
Wilson was born in Kirkcaldy, Scotland, on September 18, 1923. She was the daughter of Archibald Wernham and Christina Noble. She received a Master of Arts degree in philosophy from the University of Aberdeen in 1944. In 1949, Bertha Wilson emigrated to Canada with her husband, Reverend John Wilson, a Presbyterian minister, whom she had married in 1945. The couple settled in Renfrew, Ontario, after John Wilson accepted a posting as a pastor. Three years later, in 1952, her husband became a naval chaplain during the Korean War, and she worked as a dental receptionist in Ottawa. In 1954, her husband was posted to Halifax, Nova Scotia and they both moved.

== Legal career ==
In 1955, Wilson was admitted to Dalhousie University to study law, and three years later she completed her Bachelor of Laws degree (LLB), and was called to the bar of Nova Scotia. Wilson applied for and was accepted into a Master of Laws program at Harvard Law School, but chose not to attend. Wilson moved to Toronto and joined Osler, Hoskin & Harcourt in 1958, a year before she was called to the bar of Ontario, where she later became the firm's first female associate. In 1968, Wilson became Osler's first female partner. She founded the research department at Osler, which was the first of its kind in Canada, becoming a model for other research departments.

Wilson was the first woman appointed to the Court of Appeal for Ontario in 1975. In March, 1982, she became the first woman appointed to the Supreme Court of Canada, nominated by Pierre Trudeau. Wilson retired from the court in January 1991, and was elected a Fellow of the Royal Society of Canada, and in 1992, she was named Companion of the Order of Canada.

Wilson's noteworthy Supreme Court rulings include R v Morgentaler in 1988 (concurring reasons striking down abortion law), R v Lavallée in 1990 (battered-wife syndrome as self-defence), Operation Dismantle v R in 1985 (concurring reasons on Charter standing and justiciability), the minority reasons in R v Stevens (1988) which were adopted later in R v Hess; R v Nguyen in 1990 (mens rea and statutory rape), Kosmopoulos v Constitution Insurance Co of Canada (piercing the corporate veil), the dissenting reasons in McKinney v University of Guelph in 1990 (mandatory retirement), Andrews v Law Society of British Columbia in 1989 (equality rights test), and Sobeys Stores Ltd v Yeomans in 1989 (interpretative authority of tribunals) which are among the foundational cases interpreting the Canadian Charter of Rights and Freedoms that was enacted in 1982, the year that she was appointed to the Supreme Court.

== Royal Commission on Aboriginal Peoples ==
From 1991 to 1996, Wilson was a Commissioner of the Royal Commission on Aboriginal Peoples (RCAP). She gave a controversial and much-discussed speech about the role and influence of women in legal professions and the judiciary, titled "Will Women Judges Really Make a Difference?"

== Death ==
Wilson developed Alzheimer's disease later in life and died in an Ottawa, Ontario, retirement home on April 28, 2007, at the age of 83.

== See also ==
- Reasons of the Supreme Court of Canada by Justice Wilson
- 1987 judgments of the Supreme Court of Canada
- 1988 judgments of the Supreme Court of Canada
- 1989 judgments of the Supreme Court of Canada
