= Refugee health care in Canada =

Refugee health care is the provision of health services to refugees and refugee claimants. As early as 2009, health researchers identified particular medical needs and health vulnerabilities amongst these populations. Compared to other immigrants, they report more physical, emotional, and dental problems and, compared to those born in Canada, they have higher rates of infections and chronic diseases that are both treatable and preventable.

In Canada, the federal government has been responsible for the provision of health care to refugees since 1957. Under international law, this responsibility falls under Canada's human rights obligations to recognize the right to health for all, including refugees.

== Right to health ==
=== International law ===
The concept of a "right to health" has been recognized in a number of international rights instruments to which Canada is a party. It was first articulated in the 1946 Constitution of the World Health Organization as "the right to the enjoyment of the highest attainable standard of physical and mental health." Article 25 of the 1948 Universal Declaration of Human Rights also mentions the right to health as part of the right to an adequate standard of living. Some international human rights instruments acknowledge a right to health by general application and others through the protection of rights of specific groups such as women or children. In 1966, the right to health was recognized as a human right in article 12 of the International Covenant on Economic, Social and Cultural Rights (ICESCR), which imposes an obligation on state parties to the Covenant to create "conditions which would assure to all medical service and medical attention in the event of sickness".

=== Canadian law ===
The Canadian Charter of Rights and Freedoms does not include any express protection of the right to health. The Canadian government has frequently argued in court that social and economic rights—including the right to health—are merely 'policy objectives' that are not subject to judicial intervention. The ICESCR Committee has voiced concern over Canada's lack of compliance to these international obligations. It argues that such submissions are incompatible with Canada's obligations to provide remedies to violations of Covenant rights in domestic law.

==== Charter Cases ====
Right to health claims under the Charter's section 15 equality provision have had limited success. In Eldridge v. British Columbia, in the context of the provision of sign language, the Supreme Court found that the government should ensure that disadvantaged members of society have equal access to benefits. The Court noted that any finding to the contrary would result in a "thin and impoverished view… of equality". In a later case about the provision of autism services, Auton v. British Columbia, the Court narrowed the Eldridge approach by requiring that protected benefits be ones "provided by law".

Though a substantive equality approach to section 15 has had limited success in remedying health and other social and economic rights violations of disadvantaged groups, Colleen Flood, one of Canada's leading health law professors, argues that failed claims can contribute to furthering equality by illuminating a problem and generating political support for its resolution.

== Interim Federal Health Programme (IFHP) ==
In Canada, the provision of basic health care for refugees and refugee claimants is regulated by the Interim Federal Health Programme (IFHP) before they are covered by provincial or territorial health insurance plans. The IFHP was introduced through an Order in Council by the federal government in 1957, and has been managed by Citizenship and Immigration Canada since 1995.

Prior to June 2012, the IFHP provided refugees and asylum seekers with basic health care coverage as well as supplemental coverage including access to medication, dentistry, and vision care. Those whose application for refugee status were denied retained coverage until they were deported.

=== 2012 Reform ===
The Canadian government introduced a series of changes in April 2012. As of its date of effect on 30 June 2012, IFHP divides asylum seekers into three categories with differing levels of health coverage depending upon the person's country of origin. There are now three baskets of services:

1. expanded health care coverage;
2. health care coverage; and
3. public health or public safety health care coverage.

If the refugee claimant is from a designated country of origin, they will receive "very limited" health coverage. Some of the provinces have stepped in to cover services and medication no longer provided under the IFHP.

==== Government rationale ====
In defending the changes, the government explained its rationale as being to ensure equality between the health care received by refugees and that afforded to Canadians such that refugees would not receive superior benefits. Former Citizenship and Immigration Minister Jason Kenney emphasized the generosity of Canadians and Canada's immigration system, stating that the government did "not want to ask Canadians to pay for benefits for protected persons and refugee claimants that are more generous than what they are entitled to themselves." In a related case, Nell Toussaint v. Attorney General of Canada, the Supreme Court cautioned that by extending universal health care regardless of immigration status, Canada "could become a health-care safe haven."

The government also made cost and deterrence arguments in favour of reforming the legislation. These changes were estimated to save $100 million over five years. The government argued that the cuts would deter claimants who are drawn to the country for its health care.

==== Public criticism ====
Critics of the 2012 reforms include the Canadian Medical Association Journal and the Canadian Paediatric Society. The heads of eight major professional associations including nurses, social workers, and physicians signed a letter opposing the cuts, demanding that pre-2012 refugee health provision be restored. These advocates argue that the differential treatment of refugees and refugee applicants depending on their country of origin is discriminatory. Ontario's Health Minister Deb Matthews called for the changes to be reversed stating that "this policy change will create a class system for health care in Canada."

=== Legal challenges of right to health ===
The Canadian Charter of Rights and Freedoms does not include any express protection of the right to health, but this right has been protected indirectly by Courts through the use of other provisions, such as the section 15 equality guarantee. Cousins Section 15(1) provides that:

[E]very individual is equal before and under the law and has the right to the equal protection and equal benefit of the law without discrimination and, in particular, without discrimination based on race, national or ethnic origin, colour, religion, sex, age or mental or physical disability.

The current legal test for a section 15 equality analysis comes from Andrews as affirmed in R v Kapp. It requires that the court satisfy two conditions: (1) the law creates a distinction based on an analogous or enumerated ground; and (2) the distinction creates a disadvantage by perpetuating prejudice or stereotyping.

==== CDRC and CARL litigation ====
The right to health has been litigated under Charter provisions outside of section 15. In December 2013, the Canadian Doctors for Refugee Care (CDRC) and the Canadian Association of Refugee Lawyers (CARL) brought a challenge to the Federal Court of Canada claiming that the government's cuts to refugee health care were unconstitutional. Specifically, CARL proposes that both "country of origin" and "immigration status" are discriminatory grounds under section 15(1) of the Charter.

The CDRC/CARL challenge to the IFHP reforms is founded on two additional Charter provisions:

1. the right to life and security of the person under section 7; and
2. the right not to be subjected to cruel and unusual treatment under section 12.

===== Nell Toussaint v. Attorney General =====
Prior to the 2012 reforms, in Nell Toussaint v Attorney General, Toussaint challenged the constitutionality of the IFHP on the basis of the proposed analogous grounds of disability and citizenship. The Court found neither of these grounds to be applicable to the claimant in question, but made a point of leaving open the question as to whether immigration status could be an analogous ground. If found to be an analogous ground, the applicant's exclusion from IFHP coverage could have been in violation of section 15(1) of the Charter.

The Canadian Civil Liberties Association, in its intervenor factum, drew a comparison between immigration status and non-citizens. A number of cases have recognized that non-citizens, which capture many different types of immigration statuses, constitute an analogous ground under section 15(1). For example, in Andrews v. Law Society of British Columbia, the Court held that citizenship is an analogous ground since it was a personal characteristic "typically not within the control of the individual, and in this sense, is immutable." In Lavoie v. Canada, the Court held that "non-citizens suffer from political marginalization, stereotyping and historical disadvantage."

== Quality of healthcare ==
=== Women's health ===
Recent studies have identified significant gaps in health care coverage for female refugees, particularly in the areas of pregnancy and mental health care. Specifically, barriers to health care access such financial difficulty have been shown to intersect with other post migration difficulties experienced by women with migrant status like downward social mobility, poor access to optimal nutrition, and limited social networks. Moreover, women with migrant status are more vulnerable to being refused care on the basis of their insurance status, thereby relying on informal networks of volunteers and willing physicians, dentists, and pharmacies.

Disparities have further been identified in the area of perinatal care, where uninsured migrant women are shown to receive less overall coverage than their insured counterparts, in addition to paying for diagnostic, physician, and hospital fees, leading to less than optimal outcomes. Mental health issues among female Syrian refugees have been examined, specifically instances of maternal depression. Causes for these mental health issues are varied and include lack of social support, in addition to cultural and socioeconomic factors. Further, migrant and refugee women are more likely to succumb to postpartum depression due to the additional stressors of the migratory experience.

=== Language barriers ===
Access to health care for refugees and other migrant populations has been constrained by language barriers, among other cultural factors. A 2012 study showed that roughly sixty percent of government-assisted refugees had no English or French language skills, therefore acting as a deterrent to accessing proper health care. Concerns over privacy are also significant, as some women have expressed reluctance to using interpreters within the same, small ethnic community. However, proper interpreter training may help bridge the gaps between patient and health practitioner, as is the case in British Columbia where the Provincial Health Services Authority trained thirty interpreters in anticipation of the arrival of 3,500 Syrian refugees in 2016.

=== Mental health ===
Steady declines in migrant health have been noted to occur within a few years of arrival in Canada, a phenomenon known as the "healthy immigrant effect," due largely to Canadian immigration policy and medical evaluations of potential immigration candidates.

In a study of Tamil and Iranian female refugees in Canada, instances of mental symptoms such as recurring nightmares, emotional detachment, hyper vigilance, and difficulty concentrating have been noted. Moreover, it has been observed that youth who have experienced living as refugees demonstrate higher levels of emotional problems and aggressive behaviors due to past traumas. It was further noted that instances of post arrival trauma, in the form of discrimination based on race or refugee status, have significant negative effects on mental outcomes for youth.

A study on political violence asylum seekers detained in Canada also found that post-migration immigration status predicted the development of PTSD symptoms almost as strongly as rape or sexual assault. Financial and legal insecurity similarly predicted elevated rates of PTSD symptoms.
