= Comparator groups analysis in Canadian equality law =

The "comparator group" is an element that has been used in Canadian jurisprudence to analyze statutory human rights complaints and claims pursuant to section 15 of the Canadian Charter of Rights and Freedoms. Section 15 guarantees equality rights and the right to be free from discrimination on certain enumerated grounds.

The analysis requires the claimant to prove that she or he has been discriminated against in comparison to another group identified by the claimant or by the Court. The appropriate comparator group was described by the Supreme Court of Canada as a group with whom "the claimant shares the characteristics relevant to qualification for the benefit or burden in question, except for the personal characteristic that is said to be the ground of wrongful discrimination."

== Background and origins ==
The 1989 case Andrews v. Law Society of British Columbia was the first Supreme Court of Canada judgment to articulate the framework for analysis of Charter equality claims. The Court formulated a test requiring that the claimant prove that differential treatment on a ground enumerated in section 15 or on an "analogous" ground had occurred and the treatment had caused harm or stereotyping. The Court described equality as a comparative concept, stating that the condition of discrimination "may only be attained or discerned by comparison with the condition of others in the social and political setting in which the question arises."

Ten years later, the Supreme Court expanded on the section 15 equality analysis in Law v. Canada (Minister of Employment and Immigration), stating that identification of a comparator group was necessary to determine whether the claimant had experienced discrimination. The Court is not bound by the group chosen by the claimant but can redefine the group based on "biological, historical, and sociological similarities or dissimilarities" between the claimant and others.

The Supreme Court maintained in later cases that the identification of a comparator group was crucial to being able to assess the differential treatment claimed by the claimant. In Hodge v. Canada (Minister of Human Resources Development) in 2004, the Supreme Court reiterated that comparator groups were not a "threshold issue" and that the entire Law test was to be applied on the basis of comparing the claimant and his or her treatment to other groups. In R. v. Kapp in 2008, however, the Court recognized that the comparator group analysis could resurface in the shape of a formal analysis "focussed on treating likes alike." This decision marked the beginning of a shift of the Supreme Court away from the comparator group analysis.

== Recent developments and applications ==
The requirement to identify a comparator group is no longer necessary when making a discrimination complaint under section 15 of the Charter or section 5(b) of the Canadian Human Rights Act (CHRA), though it may still be employed as tool to show discrimination.

In 2007, the First Nation Child and Family Caring Society (FNCFCS) brought a complaint against the Federal Government of Canada for racial discrimination in the provision of child welfare services pursuant to section 15 of the Charter and section 5(b) of the CHRA. The complaint was heard in front of the Canadian Human Rights Tribunal, which ruled that there was no comparator group available to differentiate the welfare services on-reserve First Nations children received. Therefore, discrimination could not be proven. The FNCFCS then appealed to the Federal Court.

The 2011 Supreme Court case of Withler v. Attorney General (Canada) was a section 15 Charter class action against federal legislation for alleged age discrimination. Though the Court ruled against the claimants, it laid to rest the idea that a comparator group was necessary to make a discrimination complaint. It said "[i]n summary, a mirror comparator group analysis may fail to capture substantive inequality, may become a search for sameness, may shortcut the second stage of the substantive equality analysis, and may be difficult to apply. In all these ways, such an approach may fail to identify — and, indeed, thwart the identification of — the discrimination at which s. 15 is aimed."

As Withler was decided only ten days before the FNCFCS Tribunal ruling, the Tribunal did not consider it when it made its decision. However, the 2012 Federal Court appeal relied heavily on Withler. The Court clarified that requiring a comparator group was not only inconsistent with leading jurisprudence, legislation and international commitments, but also affirmed that it "may even thwart the objective of substantive equality – the animating purpose of both section 15 of the Charter and the Canadian Human Rights Act."

== Criticism ==
=== Formal and substantive equality ===
A number of scholars and organizations have criticized the comparator group analysis as favouring a formal approach to equality rather than a substantive one. A substantive equality approach recognizes, as the Court did in Andrews, that discrimination can be prevented or remedied by differential treatment according to the specific needs of the person or group targeted. Formal equality, by contrast, analyzes whether the law in question treats the individual rationally according to his or her characteristics, without taking account of that individual's disadvantage or whether the treatment would perpetuate that disadvantage. The danger of the formal equality analysis is that it "can readily...forgive state policies that impose subordinating differential treatment on disadvantaged groups so long as those policies have a rational basis." By asking claimants to identify the relevant comparator group, analyses can then fall into an assessment of whether the claimant has been or simply should be treated "the same" as the group in question without regard to his or her disadvantage.

=== Non-comparative types of discrimination ===
Some forms of discrimination, such as stereotyping, may not lend themselves to an analysis by comparison with other groups. For example, a deaf person who prefers to communicate using speech and lip-reading could be discriminated against by a government policy providing only sign-language interpretation, and no closed-captioning, during parliamentary debates. The claimant in this case is not claiming that she be treated like others based on assumptions that she is like other deaf people, but that she be treated on the basis of the personal characteristics. In this case, comparing her treatment to that of deaf people who communicate using sign-language would not resolve the discrimination, because the government could respond by taking away any interpretation for the hearing-impaired during parliamentary debates and thus treating all deaf people the same.

=== Problems in choice of comparator group ===
Claimants or courts may have difficulty choosing the right comparator group. For example, to assess whether a government's act had consequences in terms of equality of treatment, the claimant would need to be situated in a group that would then be compared to another group that is being treated differently. For example, in the case of Vriend v. Alberta, the claim was that the exclusion of 'sexual orientation' as a prohibited ground of discrimination in the Alberta Individual Rights Protection Act amounted to discrimination. To understand if this omission treated homosexuals differently from other vulnerable groups, they would need to be compared to just such groups. However, if the claim is that the failure to include homosexuals perpetuated oppression against them, then the relevant comparator group might be dominant social groups that oppress homosexuals.

=== Comparator groups and disabilities ===
The Supreme Court has acknowledged that requiring a comparator group for discrimination claims based on disability is problematic. Comparator groups for those with disabilities have either been drawn from those with no disabilities or those with different disabilities. Either scenario can impede access to substantive justice. In Moore v. British Columbia (Education), a complaint was brought on behalf of Jeffrey, a dyslexic child, for discrimination in education. At issue was whether Moore should be compared to the general population, to other students with disabilities or whether the comparator group analysis was "both unnecessary and inappropriate." The Supreme Court reasoned that comparing Moore to the general student population was inappropriate on the grounds that he needed special programs, while other students did not. The Court also rationalized that comparing a dyslexic student to other special needs students would allow the province to discriminate equally against all students with disabilities and still be immune from discrimination complaints. The Court decided against using a comparator group analysis.

=== Comparator groups and First Nations ===
Jurisprudence suggests that because of Aboriginal peoples' unique place in Canadian society, finding an appropriate comparator group is problematic. Services that are normally provided through provincial jurisdiction are provided to First Nations peoples by the federal government, which owes a fiduciary duty to them. No other group receives the same treatment, meaning that comparator groups would be difficult to identify and could possibly bar First Nations people from making discrimination complaints on the basis of race in the provision of services. Regardless of the difficulties, the Federal Court has named a possible comparator group for on-reserve Aboriginal children, when comparing the quality of welfare services. The Federal Government has enacted various legislation that mandates all welfare services provided to on-reserve First Nations children be of the same standards as those offered by the reference province. Accordingly, children who receive off-reserve welfare services would be the comparator group. How this will affect the FNCFCS complaint is yet to be determined.
