= Hodge v Canada (Minister of Human Resources Development) =

- Supreme Court of Canada

Hearing: March 18, 2004 Judgment: October 28, 2004
- Full case name: Minister of Human Resources Development (Appellant) v Betty Hodge (Respondent) and Attorney General of Quebec, Attorney General of Manitoba, Attorney General of British Columbia and Canadian AIDS Society (Interveners)
- Citations: [2004] 3 SCR 357, 2004 SCC 65, 244 DLR (4th) 257, 125 CRR (2d) 48
- Docket No.: 29351
- Prior history: Judgment for Ms. Hodge in the Federal Court of Appeal

Holding
- The denial of a survivors pension for a separated common law spouse did not violate section 15 of the Canadian Charter of Rights and Freedoms.

Court membership
- Chief Justice: Beverley McLachlin; Puisne Justices: John C. Major, Michel Bastarache, Ian Binnie, Louis LeBel, Marie Deschamps, Morris Fish, Rosalie Abella, Louise Charron

Reasons given
- Unanimous reasons by: Binnie J.
- Abella and Charron JJ. took no part in the consideration or decision of the case.

Hodge v Canada (Minister of Human Resources Development) [2004] 3 S.C.R. 357, 2004 SCC 65 was a decision by the Supreme Court of Canada regarding section 15 of the Canadian Charter of Rights and Freedoms. The Court found that in considering equality rights, comparator groups are needed to demonstrate that one has suffered differential treatment. Courts may reject the rights claimant's view as to what an appropriate comparator group would be.

== Background ==
The case began with one Betty Hodge, who was involved in a common-law marriage with a man named Mr. Bickell since 1972. Due to his alleged cruelties, she terminated the relationship in 1993. After an attempt to get back together in 1994, she ended the relationship once more. Ms. Hodge later testified in court that she meant for the second break-up to be ever-lasting. Mr. Bickell died later in 1994, and had no money. Ms. Hodge then applied for the Canada Pension Plan for a survivor's pension. This application was rejected, on the grounds that Ms. Hodge was not Mr. Bickell's spouse at the time of his death. Separated married people would have received the pension, but divorcees would not.

Common law marriage has been recognized as being equal to marriage under section 15 since Miron v. Trudel (1995). The rejection of Ms. Hodge's application was appealed to a Canada Pension Plan Review Tribunal in 1997. The tribunal held that the law was invalid because Ms. Hodge was denied a benefit for not living with Mr. Bickell for the full year up to his death. The Pension Appeals Board overturned this finding in 2000, noting that in requiring a year's residence, the Parliament of Canada was merely trying to avoid more than one common law spouse claiming eligibility for a survivor's pension. In turn, the Federal Court of Appeal found in favour of Hodge in 2002. The Federal Court found the rejection to be discrimination based on marital status. If Ms. Hodge had been married to Mr. Bickell before the break-up, she would have received a pension. Ms. Hodge compared herself to separated married people, and not divorcees, and the Federal Court accepted this comparison.

== Decision ==
The decision by the Supreme Court was written by Justice Ian Binnie. He began by noting that since Andrews v. Law Society of British Columbia (1989), comparator groups have been seen as being important to section 15 considerations. This means that a rights claimant is similar to one group, but has suffered differential treatment due to a different characteristic. This view was reaffirmed in Lovelace v. Ontario (2000). In this case, Binnie wrote that selecting the comparator group was not simply an initial step for section 15, and that each test for determining whether there has been discrimination should be done through comparisons. As questions of dignity or context are raised, the comparator group may be narrowed. Binnie felt this is what happened in the landmark section 15 case, Law v. Canada (1999). He went on to say that if, as section 15 tests are completed, it turns out the comparator group initially selected is not the most appropriate, a claim to section 15 may fail. Binnie referred to this situation as the "Achilles' heel" in section 15 precedent such as Granovsky v. Canada (Minister of Employment and Immigration) (2000).

Binnie wrote that section 15 should not be twisted by claimants choosing comparator groups whose situations do not match their own. Thus, courts can reject a claimant's choice regarding a comparator group. While the Federal Court of Appeal accepted the claimant's choice for a comparator group on the grounds that the claimant had evidence to back it up, Binnie, citing Granovsky and Law, replied the court can take a larger role in evaluating the correctness of the comparison. To select a comparator group, Binie wrote groups must be similar except with respect to one characteristic which is the basis of discrimination. The government objective is important to consider, though Binnie cautioned that if the government's selected recipients for a benefit was narrowed too exclusively, section 15 would not protect this benefit on the grounds that members of the recipient group are equal to one another.

With this in mind, Binnie rejected Ms. Hodge's comparator group of separated married people. While there was a distinction based on marital status, Ms. Hodge's relationship with Mr. Bickell had ended, and separated married spouses were different because while they may mean to end their marriages, the marriages were not legally or officially ended. Ms. Hodge had suggested that common law marriage should be seen as lasting beyond separation, if there is still some "economic dependency" between the partners. However, Binnie responded that Parliament had selected cohabitation and not economics as the indicator for common law marriage. Thus, Binnie decided that Ms. Hodge's dignity should not be affected, and section 15 was not violated.

== See also ==
- List of Supreme Court of Canada cases (McLachlin Court)
