= Section 25 of the Canadian Charter of Rights and Freedoms =

Constitutional protection of aboriginal and treaty rights

Section 25 of the Canadian Charter of Rights and Freedoms is the first section under the heading "General" in the Charter, and like other sections within the "General" sphere, it aids in the interpretation of rights elsewhere in the Charter. While section 25 is also the Charter section that deals most directly with Aboriginal peoples in Canada, it does not create or constitutionalize rights for them.

The Charter is a part of the larger Constitution Act, 1982. Aboriginal rights, including treaty rights, receive more direct constitutional protection under section 35 of the Constitution Act, 1982.

== Text ==
Under the heading "General," the section reads:

25. The guarantee in this Charter of certain rights and freedoms shall not be construed as to abrogate or derogate from any aboriginal, treaty or other rights or freedoms that pertain to the aboriginal peoples of Canada including

(a) any rights or freedoms that have been recognized by the Royal Proclamation of October 7, 1763; and
(b) any rights or freedoms that now exist by way of land claims agreements or may be so acquired.

== Purpose ==
In other words, the Charter must be enforced in a way that does not diminish Aboriginal rights. As the Court of Appeal for Ontario held in R. v. Agawa (1988), the section "confers no new rights," but instead "shields" old ones.

This is a stronger recognition for non-Charter rights than section 26's requirement that the Charter cannot be interpreted to deny that non-Charter rights exist, as section 25 specifically states that Aboriginal rights will not only continue to exist but also cannot be derogated by the Charter itself. The distinction came about during the negotiations of the Charter. Section 25's content did not appear in the first version of the Charter, in October 1980, but the original version of what later became section 26 did say that the existence of Aboriginal rights could not be denied. This sparked dramatic protests among Aboriginals, who viewed the proposed constitutional amendments as an insufficient protection of their rights. This persisted until some of their leaders, the National Indian Brotherhood, the Inuit Tapirisat of Canada, and the Native Council of Canada (now the Congress of Aboriginal Peoples), were appeased by the addition of sections 25 and 35 to the Constitution Act, 1982.

The rights to which section 25 refers explicitly include those in the Royal Proclamation of 1763. They may also include those created by ordinary legislation, like the Indian Act, and constitutional scholar Peter Hogg has speculated that without this section, section 15 (the equality provision) would have possibly threatened these rights, since they are particular to a race. Nevertheless, in the Supreme Court case Corbiere v. Canada (1999), it was found that not all legislative distinctions relating to Aboriginals are protected by section 25, and section 15 was accordingly used to extend voting rights in Aboriginal reserves to Aboriginals who did not live in those reserves. As Hogg observes, what particular rights section 25 protects was in the meantime left uncertain.

Section 35 of the Constitution Act, which falls outside the Charter, does constitutionalize some aboriginal rights. As Hogg notes, this makes section 25 altogether less important than section 35, but Corbiere leaves open the possibility that rights not constitutionalized by section 35 can have some protection under section 25.

== Aboriginal self-government ==
The question of how the Charter applies to Aboriginals and Aboriginal government has involved section 25. On the one hand, it has been argued that Aboriginal governments are not bound by the Charter. If section 35 includes a right to self-government, and section 25 ensures Aboriginal rights are not limited by the Charter, then section 25 would also guarantee that self-government is not limited by the Charter. On the other hand, the Royal Commission on Aboriginal Peoples once argued that while section 25 guarantees the existence of self-government itself, the powers of such Aboriginal governments will be limited to respect the Charter rights of individual Aboriginals.

Some bands receive a measure of autonomy under the Indian Act, and the consequent powers of the councils would be protected by section 25. Meanwhile, section 32, which bounds the federal and provincial governments to the Charter, may not include the band councils if their authority derives not only from the Indian Act but also tradition.

== Amendments to section 25 ==
In 1983, with the passing of the Constitution Amendment Proclamation, 1983, section 25 was amended to expand the protection provided for rights associated with land claims. Whereas the original wording made reference to rights acquired "by way of land claim settlement," the current version refers to rights that "now exist by way of land claims agreements or may be so acquired." While ordinarily, section 25 could have been amended with the standard 7/50 amending formula, this change was also carried out with agreement of aboriginal leaders. At the same time, the Constitution Act, 1982 was amended to add section 35.1. This new section suggests that, before section 25 is amended in the future, consultation with aboriginal leaders will again be requested by the prime minister.

== Case law ==
Scholar Celeste Hutchinson remarks in an article that little has been done with section 25 by the courts. However, she points to the British Columbia Court of Appeal case R. v. Kapp as one that discusses section 25's application. She argues Kapp failed to resolve the issue of whether section 25 is only applied when the Charter is violated, or if applies earlier, when a Charter challenge is raised. Nevertheless, Hutchinson did feel Kapp provided some significant discussion of section 25. In Kapp, Justice Kirkpatrick endorsed the view that section 25 is first considered when a Charter challenge is raised, and made a three-step test asking (1) is the right in question a treaty, Aboriginal or other right related to Aboriginals? (2) if it falls in the "other" category, does it relate to a part of Aboriginal life? (3) would the remedy possibly given by the Charter limit Aboriginal rights?
