= Egan v Canada =

- Supreme Court of Canada

Hearing: Argued November 1, 1994 Judgment: Decided May 25, 1995
- Full case name: James Egan and John Norris Nesbit v. Her Majesty The Queen in Right of Canada
- Citations: [1995] 2 SCR 513, 124 DLR (4th) 609, 12 RFL (4th) 201, 29 CRR (2d) 79, 96 FTR 80
- Docket No.: 23636
- Prior history: Appeal dismissed by the Federal Court of Appeal.
- Ruling: Appeal dismissed

Holding
- The definition of "spouse" in section 2 of the Old Age Security Act, which excludes same-sex couples, is constitutional. Sexual orientation is a prohibited ground of discrimination under section 15 of the Canadian Charter of Rights and Freedoms.

Court membership
- Chief Justice: Antonio Lamer; Puisne Justices: Gérard La Forest, Claire L'Heureux-Dubé, John Sopinka, Charles Gonthier, Peter Cory, Beverley McLachlin, Frank Iacobucci, John C. Major

Reasons given
- Majority: La Forest J, joined by Lamer CJ and Gonthier and Major JJ
- Concurrence: Sopinka J
- Dissent: Cory and Iacobucci JJ
- Dissent: L'Heureux-Dubé J
- Dissent: McLachlin J

Laws applied
- Canadian Charter of Rights and Freedoms, s 15, s 1; Old Age Security Act, RSC, 1985, c O-9, ss 2, 19(1).

Egan v Canada, [1995] 2 SCR 513 was one of a trilogy of equality rights cases published by the Supreme Court of Canada in the second quarter of 1995. It stands today as a landmark Supreme Court case which established that sexual orientation constitutes a prohibited basis of discrimination under section 15 of the Canadian Charter of Rights and Freedoms.

== Background ==
The plaintiffs—James Egan, a long-time LGBTQ rights activist, and John Norris Nesbit—were a gay couple who had been in a conjugal relationship since 1948. Upon reaching age 65 in 1986, Egan became eligible to receive Old Age Security and a guaranteed income supplement from the government under the Old Age Security Act.

The Old Age Security Act provides that a spouse of the pensioner may receive a spousal allowance should their combined income fall below a certain amount. When Nesbit reached 65, he applied to the Department of National Health and Welfare for a spousal allowance. However, he was refused on the basis that "spouse", defined in section 2 of Old Age Security Act, did not include a member of the same sex.

Joseph J. Arvay, Q.C., represented the plaintiffs, who delivered a motion for a declaration of unconstitutionality to the Federal Court of Canada (Trial Division). They alleged the definition of "spouse" under the Old Age Security Act constituted an infringement of their right to the equal protection and equal benefit of the law, entrenched in section 15 of the Charter, and that such an infringement was discriminatory on the basis of sexual orientation. They also alleged the section 15 violation could not be saved under section 1. Nesbit and Egan asked the Court to remedy the alleged Charter violation by reading the definition of spouse so as to include same-sex couples.

== Judgment of the Federal Court of Canada, Trial Division ==
The trial judge held that although the definition of "spouse" as defined in section 2 of the Old Age Security Act created a distinction, it was merely a distinction between spouses and "non-spouses" (e.g., siblings), the latter being a group which Parliament had allegedly not intended to confer similar benefits upon. The trial judge held the distinction between spouses and "non-spouses" had nothing to do with sexual orientation and therefore could not constitute discrimination on the basis of sexual orientation. The application was dismissed. This decision was appealed by the plaintiff to the Federal Court of Appeal.

== Judgment of the Federal Court of Appeal ==
On April 29, 1993, the Federal Court of Appeal affirmed the trial judge's judgment and dismissed the appeal by a 2–1 majority.

=== Reasons of Robertson JA ===
Robertson JA held the definition of "spouse", as defined by section 2 of the Old Age Security Act, did not discriminate against the appellants, Egan and Nesbit, by virtue of the fact the definition merely created a "distinction" between spouses and non-spouses. Robertson held the issue in the case was not solely concerned over the question of who may receive spousal allowances, but was in actuality "an indirect challenge to the common law and statutory concept of marriage". Our "present understanding of the law of discrimination", Robertson argued, precluded the conclusion that "the common law limitations of marriage to persons of the opposite sex" constitutes discrimination under section 15 of the Charter.

=== Reasons of Mahoney JA ===
In a concurring judgment, Mahoney JA adopted the reasoning of the trial judge, holding the definition of "spouse" in the Old Age Security Act did not discriminate against the appellants. Mahoney noted there were a broad range of "non-spouses" who lived together. They too are denied a spousal allowance, but on the basis of their "non-spousal status". Mahoney JA held the Charter challenge was misplaced: in his view, the discrimination the appellants alleged was due to "the failure of the definition to comprehend the concept of common law marriage between persons of the same sex" and not on the basis of their sexual orientation.

=== Reasons of Linden JA ===
In dissent, Linden JA accused the other two justices of engaging in exercises of circular reasoning:

The issue before this Court is whether the definition of spouse in the Old Age Security Act creates a distinction in the distribution of benefits which is discriminatory on the basis of sexual orientation. That issue cannot be resolved simply by stating that the distinction drawn by the Act is based on the definition of spouse rather than on sexual orientation. It is, after all, the definition of spouse that is being attacked as discriminatory.

Linden concluded the definition of "spouse" under the Old Age Security Act created a distinction between heterosexuals and homosexuals which constituted discrimination on the basis of sexual orientation. Linden also concluded the exclusion of same-sex couples from the definition of "spouse" did not minimally impair the appellants' section 15 rights.

== Judgment of the Supreme Court of Canada ==
In a 4–1–4 vote, the Supreme Court of Canada dismissed the appeal and upheld the constitutionality of the impugned definition of "spouse" in the Old Age Security Act.

=== Majority reasons ===
Writing for the majority (Lamer CJ and La Forest, Gonthier and Major JJ), La Forest J held the exclusion of same-sex couples from the definition of "spouse" in the impugned Old Age Security Act did not violate section 15 of the Charter. La Forest J said the controlling issue in section 15 cases is whether a legislative distinction (based on a protected ground) is "irrelevant" to the objective of the legislation in question and therefore discriminatory. He recognized the objective of the Old Age Security Act was the "support and protection of legal marriage", an institution which he described as:

firmly anchored in the biological and social realities that heterosexual couples have the unique ability to procreate, that most children are the product of these relationships, and that they are generally cared for and nurtured by those who live in that relationship. In this sense, marriage is by nature heterosexual.

La Forest J said sexual orientation is inextricably relevant to the objective of the impugned Act given the heterosexual nature of marriage. Therefore, he held it was not discriminatory under section 15 of the Charter.

La Forest J added in obiter that had he found the impugned definition discriminatory, he would have upheld it under section 1 of the Charter "for the considerations set forth in my reasons in McKinney, supra, especially at pp. 316-18 ..."

=== Concurring reasons ===
Concurring only in the result, Sopinka J disagreed with the plurality's reasoning that section 2 of the Old Age Security Act was not discriminatory. Sopinka J also endorsed the section 15 analysis performed by Cory J. However, Sopinka J argued the Canadian government must be afforded some "flexibility in extending social benefits" and that the government need not be "pro-active in recognizing new social relationships":

It is not realistic for the Court to assume that there are unlimited funds to address the needs of all. A judicial approach on this basis would tend to make a government reluctant to create any new social benefit schemes because their limits would depend on an accurate prediction of the outcome of court proceedings under s. 15(1) of the Charter.

Sopinka J cites McKinney v University of Guelph in defence of his reasoning, noting there are situations in which legislatures may take an "incremental" approach to address novel issues.

=== Dissenting reasons ===
The remaining four justices dissented, all rejecting the "irrelevance" approach as articulated by La Forest J and the "incremental" doctrine suggested by Sopinka J.

==== Cory and Iacobucci JJ ====
In joint reasons, Cory and Iacobucci JJ articulated a section 15 analysis closely following the approach laid out in Andrews. Iacobucci, in turn, wrote the Section 1 analysis.

In his section 15 analysis, Cory J disputes this was a case revolving around the concept of "adverse effect discrimination", that is, a neutral law which discriminates against a group only by the effect of the same application. Rather, he conceded that the law being challenged—the definition of "spouse" in lieu of section 2 of the Old Age Security Act—"is, quite simply, not facially neutral" at all. Rather, since the impugned Act defines a spouse only in opposite sex terms, it "draws a clear distinction between opposite-sex couples and same-sex couples".

To be discriminatory within the meaning of section 15 of the Charter, Cory J argued the distinction only had to be made on an enumerated or analogous ground protected by section 15. As such, the appellant did not have to prove the distinction on such a basis is irrelevant to the objective of the legislation.

In this case, Cory J asserted there "can be no doubt that the distinction is related to the personal characteristic of sexual orientation":

It may be correct to say that being in a same-sex relationship is not necessarily the defining characteristic of being homosexual. Yet, only homosexual individuals will form a part of a same-sex common law couple. It is the sexual orientation of the individuals involved which leads to the formation of the homosexual couple. The sexual orientation of the individual members cannot be divorced from the homosexual couple. To find otherwise would be as wrong as saying that being pregnant had nothing to do with being female. The words "of the opposite sex" in the definition of "spouse" specifically exclude homosexual couples from claiming a spousal allowance.

Cory J argued this distinction was not based on anything other than the appellants' sexual orientation and was therefore discriminatory.

Regarding the section 1 analysis, Iacobucci J identified the objective of the impugned legislation as "the alleviation of poverty in elderly households". He held this to be a "pressing and substantial" government objective under the Oakes test. However, Iacobucci J held the section 15 violation (the exclusion of same-sex couples from the definition of "spouse") was not rationally connected to that goal:

If there is an intention to ameliorate the position of a group, it cannot be considered entirely rational to assist only a portion of that group. A more rationally connected means to the end would be to assist the entire group, as that is the very objective which is sought.

Further, Iacobucci balked at the notion the cost of extending such monetary benefits may be justified as a reasonable limitation. He deplored the evidence adduced in support of this notion as "highly speculative and statistically weak" at best. Regardless, he endorsed the view in Schachter that "budgetary considerations cannot be used to justify a violation under s. 1".

Finally, Iacobucci J asserted the suggestion there is precedent for an "incremental approach" as a misrepresentation of the Court's view in McKinney. He noted the Court's decision in McKinney was far more complex, having the potential to affect "the entire composition of the workforce; the ability of younger people to secure jobs; access to university resources; promotion of academic freedom, excellence and renewal; collective bargaining rights; and the structure of pension plans". In contrast, he argued the case at hand created no such issue. In addition, he argued the "incremental" approach offered by Sopinka J introduced "two unprecedented and potentially undefinable criteria into s. 1 analysis". He said such a level of deference to the legislatures carries the potential to completely undermine the effectiveness of the Charter.

==== L'Heureux-Dubé ====
L'Heureux-Dubé J wrote her own dissent expounding on what she thought ought to be the appropriate approach in both the sections 15 and 1 analyses. First and foremost, she is extremely critical of the "irrelevance" approach expounded by La Forest. She contends that the approach defeats the very purpose of the equality rights in section 15 of the Charter, noting that the objective of the Act in question may be discriminatory per se, but would survive constitutional scrutiny.

L'Heureux-Dubé argues that, for the purpose of the section 15 analysis, the appellant also need not prove that the distinction is made on one of the enlisted grounds in section 15 or an analogous ground thereof:

It is plain from the language of s. 15 that its fundamental purpose is to guarantee to all individuals a certain kind of equality: equality without discrimination. By implication, where "discrimination" is not present, then the Charter guarantee of equality is satisfied. The nine "grounds" enumerated after this basic guarantee of freedom from discrimination are particular applications and illustrations of the ambit of s. 15. They are not the guarantee itself.

Rather, L'Heureux-Dubé preferred an approach giving substantial judicial discretion, in which the appellant must demonstrate that there is (1) "a legislative distinction", (2) that this distinction leads to a denial of any equality right as per section 15, and (3) that the distinction is "discriminatory". That is if the distinction is:

capable of either promoting or perpetuating the view that the individual adversely affected by this distinction is less capable, or less worthy of recognition or value as a human being or as a member of Canadian society, equally deserving of concern, respect, and consideration.

In her analysis, L'Heureux-Dubé registers her accord with Cory's finding that there is a legislative distinction being made. Furthermore, she concludes that the distinction denies the appellants the equal benefit of the law as a couple. Regarding the status of the appellants, she agrees with Cory that they are clearly part of a "highly socially vulnerable group, in that they have suffered considerable historical disadvantage, stereotyping, marginalization and stigmatization within Canadian society." As for the nature of the interest affected, L'Heureux-Dubé asserts that the appellants have been "directly and completely excluded, as a couple, from any entitlement to a basic shared standard of living for elderly persons cohabiting in a relationship analogous to marriage." She characterizes the interest involved as "an important facet of full and equal membership in Canadian society." The message this denial gives, L'Heureux-Dubé argues, seems undeniable:

Given the marginalized position of homosexuals in society, the metamessage that flows almost inevitably from excluding same-sex couples from such an important social institution is essentially that society considers such relationships to be less worthy of respect, concern and consideration than relationships involving members of the opposite sex.

She finds, therefore, that the exclusion of same-sex couples is indeed discriminatory and in violation of section 15 of the Charter.

Regarding the Section 1 analysis, L'Heureux-Dubé registers her agreement with the analysis of Iacobucci and characterizes the "incremental" approach, suggested by Sopinka, as undermining the values that Section 1 sought to protect.

==== McLachlin ====
McLachlin wrote a succinct dissent registering her "substantial agreement with the reasons of Justices Cory and Iacobucci".

== Significance of Egan v. Canada as a precedent ==
=== Victory for gay rights ===
Although the Supreme Court of Canada dismissed the appeal, Egan v. Canada created an important precedent for gay rights activists. The Court unanimously held that sexual orientation is an analogous ground under section 15 of the Charter and is therefore a prohibited ground of discrimination. Writing for the plurality, La Forest noted:

I have no difficulty accepting the appellants' contention that whether or not sexual orientation is based on biological or physiological factors, which may be a matter of some controversy, it is a deeply personal characteristic that is either unchangeable or changeable only at unacceptable personal costs, and so falls within the ambit of s. 15 protection as being analogous to the enumerated grounds.

This excerpt has been frequently cited by the Courts in the fallout of Egan. The Supreme Court of Canada in particular has explicitly quoted it with approval in M. v. H. and in Vriend v. Alberta, and has similarly referred to it in Little Sisters Book and Art Emporium v. Canada, Trinity Western University v. British Columbia College of Teachers, and Chamberlain v. Surrey School District No. 36.

The Ontario Court of Appeal also cited this passage in Halpern v. Canada.

=== Confusion surrounding the conflicting approaches in Egan ===
While it is normally true that majority reasons are usually controlling under the doctrine of stare decisis (precedent), Egan v. Canada would appear to be an exception. The "irrelevance" approach which prevailed by plurality in Egan was also rejected by the majority of the Supreme Court in Miron v. Trudel, [1995] 2 S.C.R. 418, in which the more "orthodox" Andrews approach prevailed by plurality.

The difficulty in determining the ratio decidendi that Egan established is illustrated by the case Re Rosenberg et al. v. Attorney General of Canada. The case is virtually identical:

Nancy Rosenberg, the plaintiff, challenged the definition of "spouse" in the Income Tax Act, R.S.C. 1985, c. 1, as a violation of section 15 of the Canadian Charter of Rights and Freedoms. Counsel for the Attorney General of Canada conceded that the definition of "spouse" in the Income Tax Act, in light of Egan, violated section 15 of the Charter. Nonetheless, they contended that since Egan could not be distinguished from the case at hand, the violation must be upheld under Section 1 of the Charter as matter of stare decisis. The plaintiffs, by contrary, argued that Iacobucci's Section 1 analysis was controlling, pointing out that the plurality in Egan had only addressed the Section 1 issue obiter and it was, therefore, not binding under the doctrine of stare decisis. The Court held that section 15 was indeed violated, but was nonetheless saved by Section 1 of the Charter.

On appeal, however, the Ontario Court of Appeal unanimously held that Egan clearly established that the exclusion of same-sex couples from the definition of "spouse" was a section 15 violation. In addition, the Court held that Vriend served as the deathblow to the "incremental" approach suggested by Sopinka. Therefore, the violation could not be saved under Section 1 of the Charter and it was no longer necessary to consider whether the Trial Judge had erred in her application of stare decisis.

Confusion surrounding the conflicting approaches laid out in Egan has subsided with the formulation of a new section 15 analysis established by a unanimous Supreme Court in Law v. Canada (Minister of Employment and Immigration).

=== Dissenting reasons adopted ===
In a landmark decision, M v H, the Supreme Court of Canada employed the new Law doctrine. Like Egan, it was contended that the exclusion of same-sex couples from a similar definition of "spouse", as per Section 29 of the Family Law Act, R.S.O. 1990, c. F.3, was a section 15 violation. The Court held, 8–1, that the exclusion of same-sex couples in the definition of "spouse" was indeed a section 15 violation and could not be saved under Section 1 of the Charter.

== See also ==
- 1995 in gay rights
- M. v. H.
