= Mark Andrews (rower) =

British rower and lawyer (1959–2020)

Personal information
- Nationality: British
- Born: 25 November 1959
- Died: 20 March 2020 (aged 60)
- Weight: 89 kg (196 lb)

Sport
- Sport: Rowing
- Club: Oxford University Boat Club
Medal record
Men's rowing
Representing Great Britain
World Rowing Championships
Silver medal – second place	1981 Munich	Eight

Mark David Andrews QC (25 November 1959 – 20 March 2020) was a University Boat Race and Great Britain international rower, and distinguished lawyer.

== Profile ==
Whilst in education at Abingdon School he gained colours for the rowing team. After leaving Abingdon in 1978 he attended Magdalen College at Oxford University studying law. He was the chair of the Fasken Martineau regional Commercial Litigation Group in Canada.

== Rowing ==
In 1980 he was selected in seat three for the Oxford dark blue boat at the world renowned Oxford v Cambridge Boat Race finishing up on the winning side. The winning crew defeated a Cambridge team that included Hugh Laurie. One year later in 1981 a second appearance ensued from seat seven and Andrews and Oxford prevailed again.

Andrews represented Great Britain and won a silver medal in the eights at the 1981 World Rowing Championships in Munich.

== Legal career ==
After graduating law at Oxford, Andrews moved to Vancouver with the goal of becoming a commercial litigator. He faced some initial obstacles in that pursuit in that he was barred from practice because of his British nationality. However, he was eventually called to the bar by order of the British Columbia Court of Appeal on 13 May 1986. The subsequent appeal of the case, Andrews v Law Society of British Columbia, [1989] 1 SCR 143 is the first Supreme Court of Canada case to deal with section 15 (equality rights) of the Canadian Charter of Rights and Freedoms.

Andrews was named as Queen's Counsel in 2004 and was a fellow of both the American College of Trial Lawyers and the International Society of Barristers. He appeared as counsel in more than 120 reported cases.

== See also ==
- List of Old Abingdonians
