= Nova Scotia (AG) v Walsh =

Nova Scotia (Attorney General) v Walsh
- Supreme Court of Canada

Hearing: 14 June 2002 Judgment: 19 December 2002
- Full case name: The Attorney General of Nova Scotia v Susan Walsh and Wayne Bona
- Citations: 2002 SCC 83
- Docket No.: 28179
- Prior history: APPEAL from Walsh v. Bona, 2000 NSCA 53 (19 April 2000), setting aside 1999 CanLII 2170 (20 July 1999)
- Ruling: Appeal allowed

Court membership
- Chief Justice: Beverley McLachlin; Puisne Justices: Claire L'Heureux-Dubé, Charles Gonthier, Frank Iacobucci, John C. Major, Michel Bastarache, Ian Binnie, Louise Arbour, Louis LeBel

Reasons given
- Majority: Bastarache J, joined by McLachlin CJ and Iacobucci, Major, Binnie, Arbour and LeBel JJ
- Concurrence: Gonthier J
- Dissent: L'Heureux-Dubé J

Nova Scotia (AG) v Walsh [2002] 4 S.C.R. 325, 2002 SCC 83 was a leading case decided by the Supreme Court of Canada on section 15 of the Canadian Charter of Rights and Freedoms and matrimonial property. The Court held that the Nova Scotia Matrimonial Property Act, which excluded unmarried cohabitating couples, was not in violation of the section 15 equality guarantee.

Susan Walsh and Wayne Bona were cohabitating together for over 10 years. Walsh attempted to get spousal and child support under the Act by applying for recognition of their cohabitation as a "spousal" relationship.

On the section 15 analysis it was determined that marital status was an analogously protected ground. On the final step of analysis the court rejected the argument that the exclusion was discriminatory. The difference between the two groups reflects the difference of the relationships and respects the individual autonomy of the parties.

Before the final decision was released the Nova Scotia government amended the Vital Statistics Act to include the option to register a domestic partnership which provides similar rights as married couples.

The Supreme Court of Canada revisited the distinction between married and unmarried couples in Quebec (Attorney General) v. A., 2013 SCC 5 (CanLII), and Walsh is no longer applicable.

== See also ==
- List of Supreme Court of Canada cases (McLachlin Court)
- Hodge v. Canada (Minister of Human Resources Development)
- Miron v. Trudel
