= Trociuk v British Columbia (AG) =

- Supreme Court of Canada

Hearing: December 4, 2002 Judgment: June 6, 2003
- Full case name: Darrell Wayne Trociuk v Attorney General of British Columbia, Director of Vital Statistics and Reni Ernst
- Citations: [2003] 1 SCR 835, 2003 SCC 34
- Ruling: Appeal allowed. Sections 3(1)(b) and 3(6)(b) Vital Statistics Act are struck out. The declaration of invalidity suspended for 12 months.

Court membership
- Chief Justice: Beverley McLachlin; Puisne Justices: Charles Gonthier, Frank Iacobucci, John C. Major, Michel Bastarache, Ian Binnie, Louise Arbour, Louis LeBel, Marie Deschamps

Reasons given
- Unanimous reasons by: Deschamps J

Laws applied
- Law v Canada (Minister of Employment and Immigration), [1999] 1 SCR 497

Trociuk v British Columbia (AG) [2003] 1 S.C.R. 835, 2003 SCC 34 is a leading Supreme Court of Canada decision on section 15(1) of the Canadian Charter of Rights and Freedoms where a father successfully challenged a provision in the British Columbia Vital Statistics Act which gave a mother complete control over the identity of the father on a child's birth certificate on the basis it violated his equality rights.

== Background ==
Darrell Trociuk and Reni Ernst were an estranged unmarried couple who became parents to triplets in January 1996. When filling out the birth registration, Ernst had indicated the father was "unacknowledged by the mother" and that they were not together at the time. Consequently, she put "Ernst" as their surnames. However, Trociuk claimed they had agreed on registering the children's surnames as "Ernst-Trociuk" and tried to get the records changed to include his particulars.

Section 3(1)(b) and 4(1)(a) of the Vital Statistics Act prevented a father from amending registrations. Trociuk applied for a declaration to have the provision struck out as unconstitutional for violating his section 15 right to equality.

The Director of Vital Statistics denied the changing of the children's surnames to include their biological father's name. Trociuk took his case to the British Columbia Supreme Court, where it was heard by Justice Collver on May 17, 1999. Collver rejected Trociuk's petition to change his children's last names. However, he did not address the issue of whether section 3(1)(b) and 3(6)(b) violated the father's right to equality; he decided that if it did, it would be justifiable under section 1 of the Charter. Trociuk was unhappy with Collver's ruling and appealed his case to the British Columbia Court of Appeal. His case was heard by a panel of three judges. Two out of the three judges, Justice Southin and Newbury ruled that the judgement of the British Columbia Supreme Court would be upheld on May 23, 2001. Justice Prowse, the other judge, disagreed with her colleagues ruling concerning the Charter issue. She believed that the Vital Statistics Act violated section 15(1) of the Charter and could not be justified in a fair and democratic society (reasonable limitations clause). Trociuk then again appealed his case to the Supreme Court of Canada. It was heard December 4, 2002. On June 6, 2003, the S.C.C. released its decision to reverse the decision of the British Columbia Court of Appeal and deemed that section 3(1)(b) and section 3(6)(b) of the Vital Statistics Act were unconstitutional and were not justifiable in a free and democratic society (reasonable limitations clause) and should be altered.

== Government’s position ==
The Crown argued that this legislation put him in a disadvantaged position that it did not impose upon the mother. He claimed that this could perceived in a manner that communicated the message that a father's relationship with their children is less worthy of respect than a mother's relationship with her children, which is demeaning to his dignity. The Crown also argued that the association of fathers who were unacknowledged by the mother without a substantial reason with those who were excluded with reason (e.g. rape), and fathers who were incapable or unknown to the mother, is similar to stereotyping and is demeaning of the fathers’ dignity.

== Respondent's position ==
The respondent argued that the infringements upon the father's right to equality, if any, did not have a significant impact on the interest of the father and were therefore non-important. However, the judge determined that involvement in deciding the child's name is an important part of a parent's life and would have a significant impact on the interest of the parent.

The respondent also argued that the father's claim to section 15(1) of the Charter was weakened because he was not one of the historically disadvantaged groups. However, the judge found this illogical. She noted that despite that the Law test stated that historical disadvantage is "probably the most compelling factor favouring a conclusion that differential treatment imposed by legislation is truly discriminatory" (para. 63), it does not state that lack of historical disadvantage is a compelling factor against finding discrimination. Thus, this argument was misguided and irrelevant.

== Decision of the Supreme Court ==
Deschamps J, writing for a Supreme Court, allowed the appeal in favour of Trociuk. It was found that section 3 of the Act violated section 15(1) of the Charter by allowing differential treatment based on sex. The provision had the effect of excluding the father's particulars from birth registration, excluding him from choosing his child's surname, and precluding any recourse. These effects were found to be arbitrary and created significant impact on the perception of the father's dignity, and consequently violated section 15(1).

On the section 1 analysis, Deschamps J held the violation could not be saved because the law did not impair Trociuk's rights as little as reasonably possible.

== Importance ==
This case set the precedent for all cases concerning section 15 of the Charter (equality rights).

== See also ==
- Gender equality
- List of gender equality lawsuits
- List of Supreme Court of Canada cases (McLachlin Court)
