= Joseph Arvay =

Canadian lawyer (1949–2020)

Joe Arvay OC OBC QC
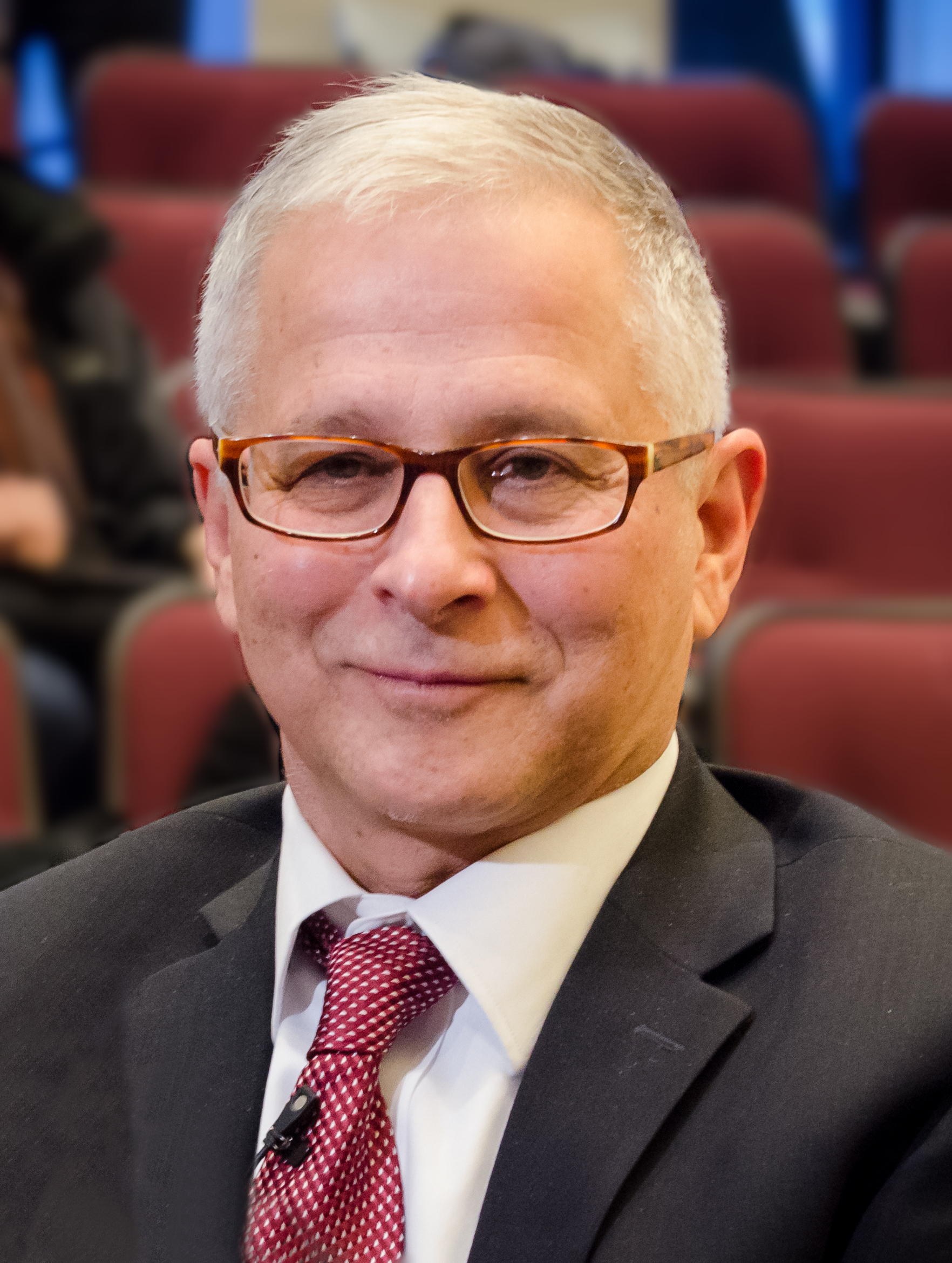
- Joe Arvay in 2014
- Born: March 18, 1949; Welland, Ontario
- Died: December 7, 2020 (aged 71); Victoria, British Columbia
- Education: University of Western Ontario (LL.B.); Harvard Law School (LL.M.)
- Spouse: Connie Addario

Joseph James Arvay, OC OBC QC (March 18, 1949 – December 7, 2020) was a Canadian lawyer who argued numerous landmark cases involving civil liberties and constitutional rights.

== Early life and education ==
Joseph James Mark Arvay was born in Welland, Ontario, on March 18, 1949, one of three children to Laura Teresa Monaco and James Arvay. His father of Hungarian descent, was a businessman who owned a stationery store; his mother was of Italian descent. In 1968, he attended Huron University College, an affiliate of the University of Western Ontario. In January 1969, at the age of 21, he was injured in car accident in southwestern Ontario, where he suffered a spinal injury that left him a paraplegic. (Note: Note that the Globe and Mail article states the injury resulted from a skiing accident,) He graduated from the University of Western Ontario with a Bachelor of Laws (LL.B.) degree in 1974; and later Harvard Law School with a Master of Laws (LL.M.).

== Legal career ==
Arvay initially pursued an academic career, teaching law at the University of Windsor. In 1981 he moved to British Columbia where he practised in the Ministry of Attorney General. He was appointed Queen's Counsel after only ten years at the bar, shocking many with his youth. In 1989 he started the boutique law firm Arvay Finlay with John Finlay, Q.C. and Murray Rankin. After Finlay's death and Rankin's entry into politics, Arvay joined the firm of Farris, Vaughan, Wills & Murphy LLP in January 2014. In October 2017, Arvay left Farris and rejoined former associates Mark Underhill, Catherine Boies Parker, Robin Gage and Alison Latimer in the newly reconstituted Arvay Finlay LLP.

== Notable cases and clients ==
=== Safe injection ===
In 2011, Arvay represented PHS Community Services Society, operators of Vancouver's Insite safe injection site, in a landmark case concerning the intersection of criminal law, health policy, and the Charter. He argued that Insite, located in Vancouver's Downtown Eastside, was a matter of provincial health jurisdiction and that closing it would endanger the lives of people who rely on its services to prevent overdose and disease. "A life-raft in a sea of misery." The unanimous Supreme Court of Canada in Canada (AG) v PHS Community Services Society held that the federal Minister of Health's refusal to grant an exemption under the Controlled Drugs and Substances Act violated section 7 of the Charter and ordered that Insite be allowed to remain open. (Note: Canada (AG) v PHS Community Services Society, 2011 SCC 44, [2011] 3 SCR 144)

=== Assisted suicide ===
Arvay played a leading role in the constitutional challenge to Canada's prohibition on physician-assisted death, arguing that it violated the section 7 Charter rights to life, liberty, and security of the person. Working with the British Columbia Civil Liberties Association, he represented plaintiffs such as Gloria Taylor, who suffered from ALS, in their fight to decriminalize assisted suicide. At the British Columbia Supreme Court, he argued that the law unjustly deprived individuals of the right to make autonomous decisions about their bodies and denied physicians the freedom to provide compassionate end-of-life care. On June 15, 2012, Justice Lynn Smith held that the Criminal Code provisions prohibiting physician-assisted death unjustifiably infringed the equality and section 7 rights of the plaintiffs. Arvay continued the argument to the Supreme Court of Canada, where the blanket prohibition on physician-assisted death was struck down in cases of grievous and irremediable suffering under section 7 of the Charter in Carter v Canada. (Note: Carter v Canada (Attorney General), 2015 SCC 5, [2015] 1 SCR 331)

=== Sperm donors ===
Arvay recently represented the plaintiff in a landmark case granting children of sperm donors the same rights regarding access to information about their birth parents as adopted children. Joseph Arvay stated that "this case represents a monumental victory for our client, Olivia Pratten, and all the donor offspring she represents who have for too long been disadvantaged by their exclusion from the legislative landscape which has promoted and perpetuated prejudice and stereotyping and caused them grave harm."

=== Sex workers ===
Arvay advanced the rights of sex workers through constitutional challenges to Canada's prostitution laws. In Canada v Downtown Eastside Sex Workers United Against Violence Society, he argued that the legal barriers and personal risks facing street-level sex workers, such as fear of police retaliation, child welfare intervention, and loss of privacy, prevented individuals from pursuing such litigation, leaving public interest groups to take the lead. Arvay emphasized that the case was not about abstract constitutional theory but about the ability of sex workers to engage in lawful activity without risking grievous bodily harm or death. (Note: Canada (Attorney General) v. Downtown Eastside Sex Workers United Against Violence Society, 2012 SCC 45, [2012] 2 SCR 524)

In Canada (AG) v Bedford, Arvay acted for the intervenors the Pivot Legal Society, the Downtown Eastside Sex Workers United Against Violence Society, and the PACE Society. The unanimous Supreme Court held several prostitution-related Criminal Code provisions unconstitutional for violating the section 7 Charter rights for security of the person. (Note: Canada (AG) v Bedford, 2013 SCC 72, [2013] 3 SCR 1101)

== Landmark cases ==
Arvay has defended high-profile cases such as the Little Sisters' Book Store trial, where he argued gay and lesbian rights in the context of freedom of speech. He was also involved in the APEC inquiry that tested the Charter of Rights and Freedoms and the role government has, and does not have, in censoring the public's inherent right to speak out on matters of political importance.

=== Andrews v Law Society ===
Andrews v Law Society of British Columbia, [1989] 1 SCR 143 is the first Supreme Court of Canada case to deal with equality rights of the Canadian Charter of Rights and Freedoms (Section 15). Arvay was the appellant for the Attorney General of British Columbia. The Court held that the Law Society's rule violated section 15 and it could not be saved under section 1.

=== Egan v Canada ===
Egan v Canada, [1995] was one of a trilogy of equality rights cases published by a very divided Supreme Court of Canada in the spring of 1995. In this case Arvay was counsel for the plaintiffs James Egan and John Norris Nesbit. It stands today as a landmark Supreme Court case which established that sexual orientation constitutes a prohibited basis of discrimination under Section 15 of the Canadian Charter of Rights and Freedoms.

=== Chamberlain v Surrey School District No. 36 ===
Arvay was counsel in the Supreme Court of Canada for Chamberlain v Surrey School District No. 36 where he successfully argued that a local school board could not impose its religious values by refusing to permit the use of books in K-1 that sought to promote tolerance of same-sex relationships.

=== Genetic Fairness ===
Reference by Quebec to the Court of Appeal of Quebec concerning the constitutionality of the Genetic Non-Discrimination Act, 2020 SCC 17. Acted for the appellant, Canadian Coalition for Genetic Fairness, in an appeal to declare that the GNDA is a valid exercise of Parliament's power to enact criminal law pursuant to section 91(27) of the Constitution Act, 1867.

=== Public Access to Records Given Under a Confidential and Private Process ===
Canada v. Fontaine, 2017 SCC 47. Acted for the Chief Adjudicator Indian Residential Schools Adjudication Secretariat in regard to whether records of the Indian Residential Schools Settlement Agreement remain confidential or are under the control of a government institution under the Access to Information Act, the Library and Archives of Canada Act and the Privacy Act.

=== Damages for Wrongful Conviction ===
Henry v. British Columbia, 2015 SCC 24. Acted for the plaintiff/appellant Henry, who successfully brought a section 24 Charter claim for damages arising from prosecutorial misconduct absent proof of malice and wrongful conviction for almost 27 years.

=== Right to Strike ===
Saskatchewan Federation of Labour v. Saskatchewan, 2015 SCC 4. Acted for the interveners the British Columbia Teachers’ Federation and the Hospital Employees’ Union, in support of the Federation of Labour's constitutional right to strike.

=== Access to Medical Information of Sperm Donors ===
Pratten v. BC, 2012 BCCA 480. Acted for the plaintiff/respondent in her bid to grant children of sperm donors the same rights regarding access to medical information about their birth parents as adopted children.

=== Charter Rights of Guantanamo Bay Detainees ===
Canada v. Khadr, 2010 SCC 3. Acted for the intervener, the British Columbia Civil Liberties Association, for a declaration that Omar Khadr's Charter rights were violated by detention at Guantanamo Bay.

=== Constitutionality of Provincial Tax ===
Vander Zalm v. British Columbia, 2010 BCSC 1320; see also 2010 BCSC 1174. Acted for the petitioner, former Premier of the Province of BC, in his challenge that the Harmonized Sales Tax was unconstitutional.

=== Freedom of Association to Bargain Collectively: Health Services and Support ===
Facilities Subsector Bargaining Assn. v. British Columbia, 2007 SCC 27. Acted for the plaintiffs in their successful Charter challenge that the Health and Social Services Delivery Improvement Act violated their constitutional rights to freedom of association including the procedural right to collective bargaining.

=== Advance Costs ===
Little Sisters Book and Art Emporium v. Canada (Commissioner of Customs and Revenue), 2007 SCC 2. Acted for the plaintiff/appellant refining the law of advance costs by the granting of a public interest advance costs order.

=== Same-Sex Marriage ===
Reference re Same-Sex Marriage, 2004 SCC 79. Acted for the interveners, Egale Canada Inc. and others, in their successful challenge that a federal proposed Act that marriage for civil purposes is the lawful union of two persons to exclusion of all others. Freedom of religion (protecting religious officials from being compelled by state to perform same-sex marriage contrary to their religious beliefs) is protected.

=== Freedom of Expression and Power of School Board ===
Chamberlain v. Surrey School District No. 36, 2002 SCC 86. Acted the petitioners/appellants in their successful argument that a local school board could not impose its religious values by refusing to permit the use of books in K-1 that sought to promote tolerance of same-sex relationships.

=== Equality Rights and Freedom of Expression ===
Little Sisters Book and Art Emporium v. Canada (Minister of Justice), 2000 SCC 69. Acted for the plaintiff, a gay and lesbian bookstore, in their successful Charter challenge for freedom of expression and equality rights in respect of Customs officials wrongly delaying, confiscating or prohibiting materials imported by bookstore on numerous occasions under the Customs Act.

=== Aboriginal Title ===
Delgamuukw v. British Columbia, [1997] 3 SCR 1010. Acted for the respondent/appellant on the cross-appeal, Her Majesty the Queen in Right of the Province of British Columbia in this seminal case on aboriginal title and section 35 of the Constitution Act, 1982.

== Recognition ==
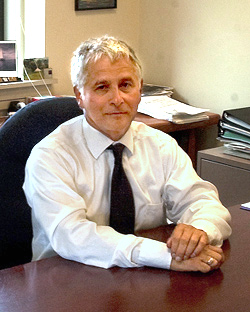
Arvay in his office in 2011

In 2000, he was awarded the Walter S. Tarnopolsky Human Rights Award, and was described by Justice Michèle Rivet as "one of Canada's most tireless civil rights and human rights lawyers ... He has made an exceptional commitment to human rights in this country." He was voted one of Canada's Top 25 Most Influential Lawyers in 2010, 2011, and 2012 by Canadian Lawyer magazine. Peter Gzowski put it as follows: "[Arvay] has had a remarkable role in shaping how our Constitution is interpreted".

On March 18, 2014, he received the McGill University Centre for Human Rights and Legal Pluralism's 2014 Robert S. Litvack Award, and gave a conference titled "Litigating Charter Challenges: Stories of a Constitutional Lawyer".

In 2016, Arvay was awarded an honorary Doctor of Laws degree from York University, Osgoode Hall Law School, and in 2018 was awarded the same honour by the University of Victoria. In 2017, he became an Officer of the Order of Canada, one of Canada's most prestigious civilian honours, and in 2018, was awarded the Order of British Columbia, the highest form of recognition the Province can extend to its citizens.

== Death ==
Arvay died on December 7, 2020, after a heart attack. He was honoured with tributes from the Attorney General of British Columbia, the Chief Justice of Canada, and the British Columbia Civil Liberties Association, among others.
