= R v Turpin =

- Supreme Court of Canada

Hearing: 16 June 1988 Judgment: 4 May 1989
- Full case name: Sharon Turpin and Latif Siddiqui v Her Majesty The Queen
- Citations: [1989] 1 S.C.R. 1296
- Ruling: Accused appeal dismissed

Court membership
- Chief Justice: Brian Dickson; Puisne Justices: Jean Beetz, William McIntyre, Antonio Lamer, Bertha Wilson, Gerald Le Dain, Gérard La Forest, Claire L'Heureux-Dubé, John Sopinka

Reasons given
- Unanimous reasons by: Wilson J.
- Le Dain, McIntyre and Sopinka JJ. took no part in the consideration or decision of the case.

R v Turpin, [1989] 1 S.C.R. 1296 is a constitutional case of the Supreme Court of Canada on the right to trial by jury. The Court held that the requirement for a murder trial to be conducted in front of a judge and jury did not violate the right to trial by jury under s 11(f) of the Canadian Charter of Rights and Freedoms, nor the equality guarantee under s 15 of the Charter.

== Background ==
Sharon Turpin and Latif Siddiqui were tried for first degree murder in Ontario. The Criminal Code at that time required that all murder cases were to be tried in front of a judge and jury. Turpin and Siddiqui challenged the constitutionality of the provisions on two grounds. First, they claimed that section 11(f) of the Charter granted them a right to choose between judge alone or judge and jury, which was violated by the Code provisions. Second, they argued that since there is an exception to the Code provisions for trials in Alberta, there was a violation of their right to equality under section 15 of the Charter.

At trial, the judge found that the provisions were unconstitutional for violating both sections. On appeal, the ruling was overturned.

== Opinion of the Court ==
Justice Wilson, writing for the Court, dismissed the appeal and found that there was no violation. She found that section 11(f) did not protect selection of mode of trial, nor did it protect the right to trial by judge alone. On the equality issue she found that persons living outside of Alberta did not constitute a "disadvantaged group" as required in a successful claim.
