= Corbiere v Canada (Minister of Indian and Northern Affairs) =

- Supreme Court of Canada

Hearing: October 13, 1998 Judgment: May 20, 1999
- Full case name: Her Majesty The Queen as represented by the Minister of Indian and Northern Affairs Canada and the Attorney General of Canada, and Batchewana Indian Band v. John Corbiere, Charlotte Syrette, Claire Robinson and Frank Nolan, each on their own behalf and on behalf of all non-resident members of the Batchewana Band
- Citations: [1999] 2 S.C.R. 203

Court membership
- Chief Justice: Antonio Lamer; Puisne Justices: Claire L'Heureux-Dubé, Charles Gonthier, Peter Cory, Beverley McLachlin, Frank Iacobucci, John C. Major, Michel Bastarache, Ian Binnie

Reasons given
- Majority: McLachlin and Bastarache JJ., joined by Lamer C.J., Cory and Major JJ.
- Concurrence: L'Heureux‑Dubé J., joined by Gonthier, Iacobucci and Binnie JJ.

Laws applied
- Law v. Canada (Minister of Employment and Immigration), [1999] 1 S.C.R. 497

Corbiere v Canada (Minister of Indian and Northern Affairs) [1999] 2 S.C.R. 203, is a leading case from the Supreme Court of Canada where the Court expanded the scope of applicable grounds upon which a section 15(1) Charter claim can be based. This was also the first case to use the framework proposed by Law v. Canada.

== Background ==
Members of the Batchewana Indian Band, on behalf of themselves and all other non-resident members of the band, sought a declaration that section 77(1) of the Indian Act violates section 15(1) of the Charter. The section of the Indian Act states that only band members "ordinary resident" on the reserve be permitted in order to vote in the band elections even though only one third of the registered members live on the reserve.

== Court's ruling ==
The court unanimously agreed with the Court of Appeal's ruling that the Act violated section 15(1) of the Charter. However, the Court was split 5 to 4 on the proper application of the test.

The majority opinion was written by McLachlin and Bastarache JJ. with Lamer C.J., Major, and Cory JJ. concurring.

The Court found that an analogous ground upon which a section 15 claim can be based must be immutable, either actually immutable, such as race, or constructively immutable such as religion. Furthermore, once a ground is identified as analogous it remains analogous for all circumstances.

The minority opinion was given by L'Heureux-Dubé with Gonthier, Iacobucci and Binnie JJ. concurring.

== See also ==
- List of Supreme Court of Canada cases (Lamer Court)
- The Canadian Crown and First Nations, Inuit and Métis
- Canadian Aboriginal case law
- Numbered Treaties
- Indian Act
- Section Thirty-five of the Constitution Act, 1982
- Indian Health Transfer Policy (Canada)
