= Lavoie v Canada =

- Supreme Court of Canada

Hearing: June 12, 2001 Judgment: March 8, 2002
- Citations: 2002 SCC 23, [2002] 1 SCR 769
- Docket No.: 27427
- Ruling: appeal dismissed

Court membership
- Chief Justice: Beverley McLachlin; Puisne Justices: Charles Gonthier, Frank Iacobucci, John C. Major, Michel Bastarache, Ian Binnie, Louise Arbour, Louis LeBel, Marie Deschamps

Reasons given
- Majority: Bastarache J
- Concurrence: Arbour J
- Dissent: McLachlin CJ and L'Heureux‑Dubé J

Laws applied
- Law v Canada (Minister of Employment and Immigration), [1999] 1 SCR 497

Lavoie v Canada, [2002] 1 SCR 769, 2002 SCC 23 is a leading decision of the Supreme Court of Canada on whether preference on basis of citizenship infringed equality guarantee under section 15(1) of the Canadian Charter of Rights and Freedoms. The Court found that the federal Public Service Employment Act (PSEA), which gave preference to citizens when referring to departments, was discriminatory. The violation was saved under section 1 of the Charter as a reasonable limitation on equality rights.

== Background ==
Several foreign nationals applied to the federal government for employment. Section 16(4)(c) of the PSEA gave preference to Canadian citizens when allocating applicants to different departments. The foreign nationals applied to the Federal Court of Canada to strike out the provision. The Federal Court held the provision violated section 15 but was saved by section 1. The Federal Court of Appeal upheld the decision.

== Reasons of the court ==
Bastarache J wrote for the majority in upholding the provision. In his application of the Law test for section 15, he noted that by creating the distinction between citizen and foreign national, Parliament was placing an additional burden on already disadvantaged group. He said that it was well settled that foreign nationals are a group that do suffer from stereotypes, marginalization, and historical disadvantage, but the Act does not attempt to compensate for this.

Bastarache J spent some time considering the element of "dignity" introduced in Law v Canada (Minister of Employment and Immigration). The dignity inquiry requires the subjective view of the claimant to be rationally grounded in circumstances that a reasonable would share that experience. He found that denial of professional development impacted a significant element of the fundamental right of choice. On the section 1 analysis, Bastarache J considered the positive goals of the provision. He saw merit in having a law that encouraged naturalization and increased the value of citizenship. He further observed that the negative impact of the exclusion was sufficiently small to warrant justification by the valuable objective.

== See also ==
- Foreign worker
- List of Supreme Court of Canada cases
