= R v Kapp =

2008 Supreme Court of Canada decision

- Supreme Court of Canada

Hearing: December 11, 2007 Judgment: June 27, 2008
- Full case name: Her Majesty The Queen v John Michael Kapp et al
- Citations: 2008 SCC 41, [2008] 2 SCR 483, 294 DLR (4th) 1, [2008] 8 WWR 1, 232 CCC (3d) 349, 58 CR (6th) 1, 79 BCLR (4th) 201
- Docket No.: 31603
- Prior history: Stay of proceedings granted, 2003 BCPC 279, [2003] 4 CNLR 238; Stay lifted, 2004 BCSC 958, (2004), 31 BCLR (4th) 258, [2004] 3 CNLR 269; Affirmed, 2006 BCCA 277 (CanLII), (2006), 56 BCLR (4th) 11, 271 DLR (4th) 70, [2006] 10 WWR 577, [2006] 3 CNLR 282
- Ruling: A communal fishing license granted exclusively to Indigenous people does not violate section 15 of the Charter because section 15(2) enables governments to pro‑actively combat discrimination by developing programs aimed at helping disadvantaged groups to improve their situation

Court membership
- Chief Justice: Beverley McLachlin; Puisne Justices: Michel Bastarache, Ian Binnie, Louis LeBel, Marie Deschamps, Morris Fish, Rosalie Abella, Louise Charron, Marshall Rothstein

Reasons given
- Majority: McLachlin CJ and Abella J (paras 1–66), joined by Binnie, LeBel, Deschamps, Fish, Charron and Rothstein JJ
- Concurrence: Bastarache J (paras 67–123)

Laws applied
- Aboriginal Communal Fishing Licences Regulations, SOR/93‑332; Canadian Bill of Rights, RSC 1985, App III, s 2; Canadian Charter of Rights and Freedoms, ss 1, 2, 3, 15, 16(3), 21, 25, 27, 28, 29, 32(a); Constitution Act, 1867, ss 91(24), 93; Constitution Act, 1982, s 35; Constitution Amendment Proclamation, 1983, RSC 1983, App II, No 46; Fisheries Act, RSC 1985, c F‑14; Indian Act, RSC 1985, c I‑5, ss 81, 83, 85.1, 88.

R v Kapp, 2008 SCC 41, is a Supreme Court of Canada decision that held that a communal fishing license granted exclusively to Aboriginals did not violate Section 15 of the Canadian Charter of Rights and Freedoms. The case stemmed from an appeal by John Michael Kapp and a group of non-aboriginal commercial fishers who staged a "protest" fishery with the intention of being charged by law enforcement and challenging the constitutional status of an exclusive Aboriginal commercial fishing license.

The Supreme Court dismissed the appeal based on the understanding that a distinction made on the basis of an enumerated or analogous ground in a government program would not constitute discrimination under Section 15 if the program met a two part test under Section 15(2): (1) it had an ameliorative or remedial purpose, and (2) it targeted a disadvantaged group identified by the enumerated or analogous grounds. In essence, the Court concluded that the prima facie discrimination was permitted because it aimed to improve the situation of a disadvantaged group, as allowed by Section 15(2) of the Charter.

In the Kapp decision, the Court acknowledged the difficulties encountered with the Court's ruling in Law v Canada (Minister of Employment and Immigration), particularly regarding the utilization of "human dignity" as a legal test. While human dignity is an essential value underlying Section 15, it is an abstract and subjective concept that, even with the guidance provided by the four factors outlined in the Law case, proves to be confusing when applied and poses an additional burden on equality claimants. This ruling reinterprets Law in a manner that does not impose a new and distinct test for discrimination but rather reaffirms the approach to substantive equality established in Andrews v Law Society of British Columbia and subsequent decisions.

The core objective of combating discrimination underlies both Section 15(1) and Section 15(2) of the Charter. Section 15(1) aims to prevent governments from making distinctions based on the enumerated or analogous grounds that perpetuate group disadvantage and prejudice or impose disadvantage based on stereotypes. Section 15(2), on the other hand, enables governments to actively address existing discrimination through affirmative measures.

== Background ==
In 1981, the government of Canada appointed a Commission under the Inquiries Act led by Peter H. Pearse to examine commercial fishing on the Pacific coast and make recommendations related to the condition, management and utilization of these fisheries. Pearse's final report made a number of recommendations including enhancing aboriginal involvement in commercial fishing, and noting the economic disadvantage of Aboriginal peoples due to a prohibition against selling fish. (Note: R. v. Kapp, 2008 SCC 41, para 6)

In 1992, in response to the Pearse Report and the legal case R v Sparrow, the Canadian government established the Aboriginal Fisheries Strategy. This strategy aimed to increase Aboriginal participation in Canada's commercial fishery industry. (Note: R. v. Kapp, 2008 SCC 41, para 7) The Aboriginal Fishing Strategy had three primary objectives: respecting the rights recognized in Sparrow, providing a greater role in fisheries management with the associated economic benefits, and minimizing disruption to non-aboriginal fisheries. The Canadian government introduced a pilot program which issued three communal fishing licenses under the Aboriginal Communal Fishing Licences Regulations. The licenses provided the exclusive right for aboriginal band-designated fishers to catch salmon during a specified 24-hour period, and sell those fish.

From 7:00 a.m. on August 19, 1998 to 7:00 a.m. on August 20, 1998 was designated a period where only the designated aboriginal fishers were eligible to fish for sockeye salmon in a region off the British Columbia coast. (Note: R. v. Kapp, 2008 SCC 41, para 8) However, a group of non-aboriginal commercial fishers including John Michael Kapp, organized a "protest" fishery with the intent of being charged by law enforcement and challenging the constitutional status of the exclusive aboriginal license. As a result, Kapp and the other protesters were subsequently charged with fishing during a prohibited time contrary to section 53(1) of the Pacific Fishery Regulations, 1993, an offence under Section 78 of the Fisheries Act. (Note: Regina v. Kapp, et al., 2004 BCSC 958, para 3)

=== Provincial Court of British Columbia decision ===
At his hearing in provincial court, Kapp filed a Notice of Constitutional Question seeking a declaration stating that the communal fishing licenses and the provisions they were issued under violated Section 15 of the Canadian Charter of Rights and Freedoms. (Note: R. v. Kapp, 2003 BCPC 279, para 3)

On July 28, 2003, Judge W.J. Kitchen ruled the communal fishing licenses infringed upon the equality rights protected under Section 15 of the Charter. Furthermore, he determined that these licenses could not be justified under Section 1 of the Charter. As a result, Judge Kitchen decided to stay the charges against Kapp and the other protest fishers. (Note: R. v. Kapp, 2008 SCC 41, para 10)

In reaching this conclusion, Judge Kitchen applied the Law test established in the 1999 case of Law v Canada (Minister of Employment and Immigration). He relied on the testimony provided by the non-aboriginal fishers, who stated that they felt the program was offensive and demeaning, and resulted in a loss of human dignity. Additionally, Judge Kitchen found that the government had not made any efforts to assess the economic benefits of the program or the needs of the Aboriginal bands. Based on these findings, he concluded that the program could not be justified under Section 1 of the Charter. (Note: R. v. Kapp, 2003 BCPC 279, para 199, 218)

=== Supreme Court of British Columbia decision ===
In the appeal to the Supreme Court of British Columbia, Chief Justice Donald Brenner reached a different conclusion than Judge Kitchen regarding the implementation of the Law test. Chief Justice Brenner determined that Judge Kitchen had not properly applied the test, placing undue emphasis on the subjective perceptions of the witnesses rather than considering the objective reality of their situation. As a result of this ruling, Chief Justice Brenner allowed the appeal and entered convictions against the protesters. (Note: Regina v. Kapp, et al., 2004 BCSC 958, para 122) Kapp and the other protest fishers received a suspended sentence of six months and a $100 fine. (Note: R. v. Kapp et al, 2004 BCSC 1503, para 25)

Upon evaluating the Law test, Chief Justice Brenner found that all four aspects of the test weighed against the argument made by Kapp and the other non-aboriginal fishers that they had experienced discrimination. (Note: Regina v. Kapp, et al., 2004 BCSC 958, para 76) Additionally, Chief Justice Brenner recognized a strong connection between the pilot program and the needs of the Aboriginal bands. He concluded that the program partially served as an ameliorative measure by providing economic opportunities. (Note: Regina v. Kapp, et al., 2004 BCSC 958, paras 97–102)

=== British Columbia Court of Appeal decision ===
Kapp and the other convicted fishers proceeded to appeal Justice Brenner's decision to a five-member panel of the British Columbia Court of Appeal. On June 8, 2006, the Court of Appeal dismissed the appeal, with each justice providing unique reasons that concurred with the findings of reached by Justice Richard T.A. Low.

Justice Richard T.A. Low concluded that the Section 15 challenge put forth by Kapp and the fishers could not succeed. He reasoned that they had not been denied a legal benefit in a regular or discriminatory manner, instead Low emphasized that the general fisheries management system had provided the fishers with numerous benefits. (Note: R. v. Kapp, 2006 BCCA 277, paras 80–82) Justice Low chose not to consider the applicability of Section 25, as he believed it was necessary to establish the existence of a Charter violation before addressing the rights provided under Section 25. However, he expressed reservations about whether Aboriginal commercial fishing rights could be considered under Section 25. (Note: R. v. Kapp, 2006 BCCA 277, paras 85–90) Justice Kenneth C. Mackenzie found that the Section 15 challenge could not succeed. He agreed largely with the opinion of Justice Brenner of the British Columbia Supreme Court, noting that the fishers were unable to satisfy the human dignity element of the Law test. (Note: R. v. Kapp, 2006 BCCA 277, paras 107–109) Chief Justice Lance Finch concurred with the reasons of Low and Mackenzie on the applicability of Section 15 and agreed that Section 25 was not engaged. (Note: R. v. Kapp, 2006 BCCA 277, paras 154–158) Justice Risa Levine concurred with the reasons of Justices Low and Mackenzie, but declined to consider Section 25 on the grounds it was introduced by the intervener parties and the court had to give primary consideration to the arguments of the parties. (Note: R. v. Kapp, 2006 BCCA 277, paras 159–162) Justice Pamela A. Kirkpatrick concurred with the reasons of Justices Low and Mackenzie that the Section 15 challenge be dismissed, (Note: R. v. Kapp, 2006 BCCA 277, para 117) however, she disagreed with the lower courts conclusion that Section 25 did not provide that a fishing licence is an Aboriginal right. (Note: R. v. Kapp, 2006 BCCA 277, para 148) Justice Kirkpatrick argued that the protection afforded by Section 25 through the language "other rights or freedoms" provided that the content of the right was the significant factor (fishing), and not the manner it was acquired (licence). (Note: R. v. Kapp, 2006 BCCA 277, para 138)

== Supreme Court of Canada ==
Kapp and the other commercial fishers appealed the decision of the British Columbia Court of Appeals to the Supreme Court of Canada which heard the case on December 11, 2007. On June 27, 2008, Chief Justice Beverly McLachlin and Justice Rosalie Abella jointed authored the majority decision, while Justice Michel Bastarache authored a concurring opinion. The court ruled that the communal fishing licence was protected under Section 15(2) of the Charter, and the claims by Kapp and the other commercial fishers could not be successful under Section 15. (Note: R. v. Kapp, 2008 SCC 41, para 3)

=== Majority decision ===
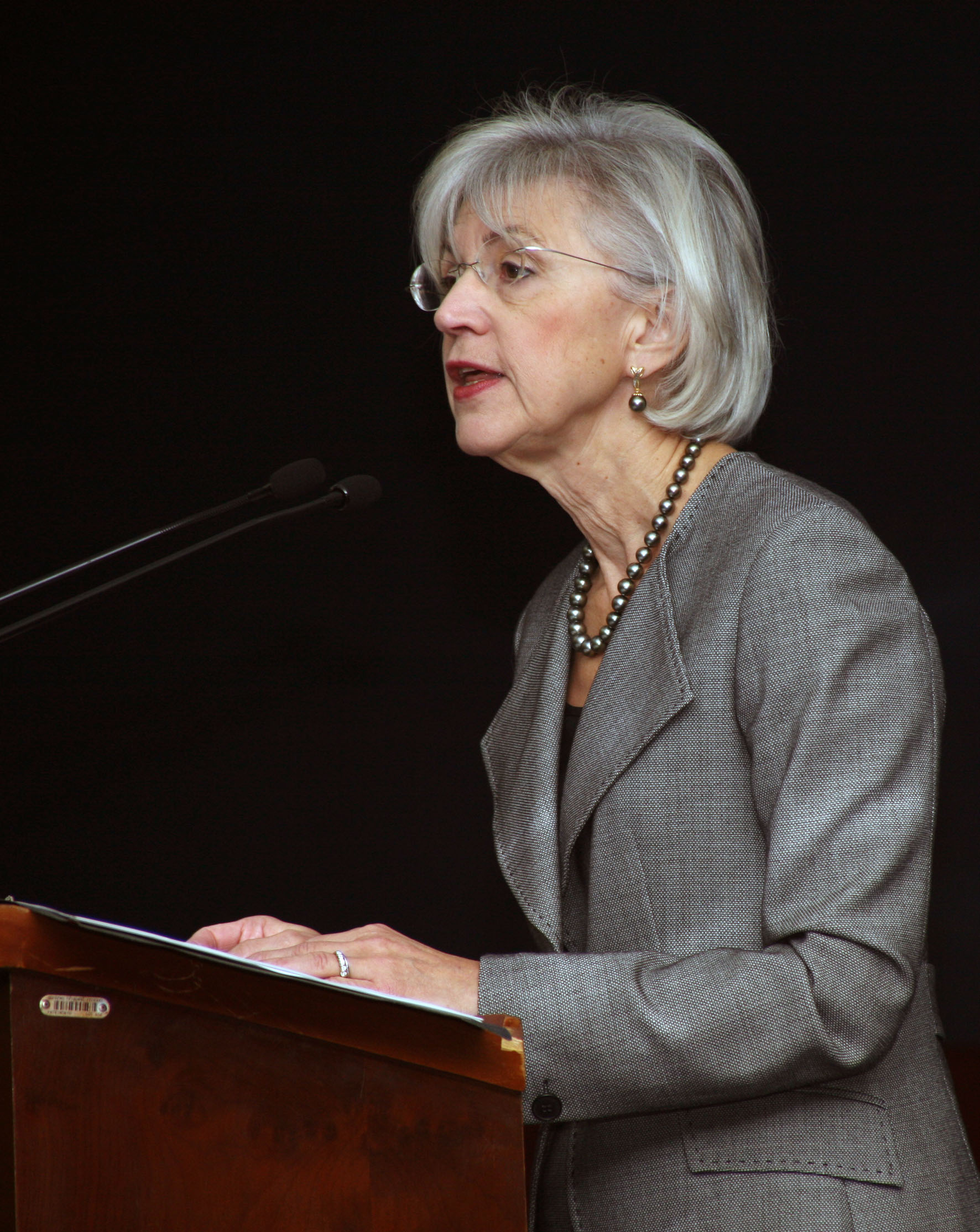
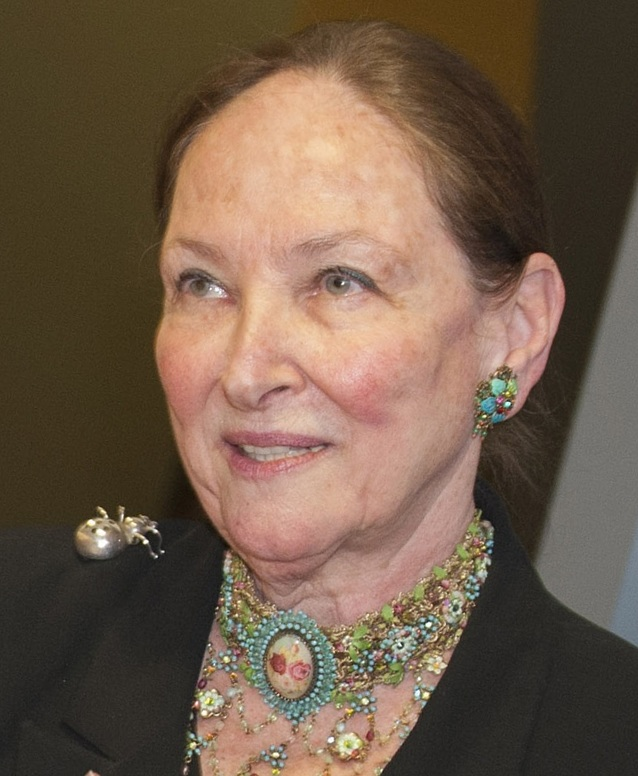
The majority opinion was authored by Chief Justice of Canada Beverley McLachlin (left) and Justice Rosalie Abella (right).

The majority opinion, jointly authored by Chief Justice McLachlin and Justice Abella, presented a new interpretation of Section 15(2). They argued that the provision allows for certain distinctions in law to be exempted from full scrutiny under Section 15(1) when those programs have an ameliorative purpose. In the case of Kapp, the court agreed that the communal fishing licenses program made a distinction based on race. (Note: R. v. Kapp, 2008 SCC 41, para 29) However, the court deemed the program constitutional under Section 15(2) of the Charter due to its intent to ameliorate the conditions of a disadvantaged group. This approach represents a change from the previous interpretation of Section 15(2) from the 2000 case Lovelace v Ontario. In Lovelace, the court found that Section 15(2) was "confirmatory" of Section 15(1), meaning a claim against a government program must be assessed under Section 15(1) first.

The majority acknowledged the challenges posed by the Law test, which had utilized human dignity as a legal standard. They recognized that "human dignity" is an abstract and subjective concept, and caused confusion and difficulty in its application. (Note: R. v. Kapp, 2008 SCC 41, paras 21–22) Additionally, the Law test imposed an added burden on claimants seeking equality, rather than the enhancement it was supposed to provide. The Court also noted that the comparator group analysis could resurface in the shape of a formal analysis "focussed on treating likes alike". Consequently, the majority redefined the Law test, removing the "human dignity" element, and placing more focus on whether the claimant experienced discrimination that either perpetuated a disadvantage or stereotype. (Note: R. v. Kapp, 2008 SCC 41, para 24)

Significantly, the majority emphasized the role of Section 15(2) and accorded it greater weight when determining whether a government program is discriminatory under Section 15(1). This interpretation places the onus on the government to demonstrate that their program actively combats discrimination in pursuit of substantive equality. (Note: R. v. Kapp, 2008 SCC 41, para 37) To support the government's argument, it is necessary to establish a legislative goal for the program, rather than relying solely on its actual effects. (Note: R. v. Kapp, 2008 SCC 41, para 44) In essence, the majority found that Section 15(1) and 15(2) work in tandem to promote the concept of substantive equality. Section 15(1) prevents "discriminatory distinctions", while Section 15(2) permits governments to implement programs aimed at assisting disadvantaged groups (e.g., affirmative action) without the risk of challenge under Section 15(1). (Note: R. v. Kapp, 2008 SCC 41, note 2)

The court also acknowledged certain limitations to the application of Section 15(2). They observed that laws intended to "restrict or punish behaviour" would not be safeguarded by Section 15(2). (Note: R. v. Kapp, 2008 SCC 41, para 54) Additionally, for a program to receive protection, the group it targets must be specific and identifiable. Programs with a broad societal impact, such as social assistance, would not meet this criterion. (Note: R. v. Kapp, 2008 SCC 41, para 55)

Regarding Section 25 of the Charter, the majority raised concerns about whether the communal licenses would fall within the scope of this section. They found that only rights of a constitutional nature can benefit from the protection offered by Section 25. (Note: R. v. Kapp, 2008 SCC 41, para 63)

=== Concurrence ===
Justice Michel Bastarache provided a concurring opinion, aligning with the majority's conclusion that Kapp and the commercial fishers' appeal could not succeed. He also agreed with the revised test for the application of Section 15. (Note: R. v. Kapp, 2008 SCC 41, para 76) However, Justice Bastarache held the view that the appeal could not be successful because the program in question was protected under Section 25 of the Charter. According to his perspective, in cases where a conflict arises between an equality claim invoking both Section 15 and Section 25, the court must prioritize the consideration of Section 25 before delving into Section 15.

== Commentary ==
In Kapp, the Supreme Court placed considerable importance on Section 15(2) of the Charter, building upon the interpretation established in Lovelace v Ontario. Unlike Lovelace, which required the court to assess whether a government program met the requirements of Section 15(1) before considering protection under Section 15(2), the Kapp decision assigned significant weight to the intentions of the legislature and government in developing affirmative action programs. The focus shifted from emphasizing the impact or outcomes of these programs to prioritizing the goals and objectives set by the government.

The majority in Kapp left room for the potential reconsideration of the test for Section 15(2) of the Charter, acknowledging that while the current test was adequate for the issues at hand, it could be refined in the future. (Note: R. v. Kapp, 2008 SCC 41, para 41) Professor Sophia Moreau from the University of Toronto suggests that this decision may have been influenced by the fact that the claimants in Kapp belonged to a privileged group that is not eligible for protection under Section 15. As a result, future cases before the court involving disadvantaged groups may prompt a different approach. Moreau also argues that the emphasis on the purpose of a government program in the new test for Section 15(2) safeguards well-intentioned programs that may inadvertently have discriminatory effects from facing rigorous scrutiny in court.

== Subsequent judicial developments ==
The Supreme Court further expanded on the newly established formula for Section 15(2) of the Charter in the 2011 case of Alberta (Aboriginal Affairs and Northern Development) v. Cunningham. In this case, the claimants argued that the government's ameliorative program was not inclusive enough. However, the court unanimously dismissed the claim and provided additional clarity on the Section 15(2) review process.

In Cunningham, the Court emphasized that a Section 15(2) review involves a comprehensive analysis of "statutory interpretation". This interpretation requires consideration of factors such as the expression of legislative intent, legislative history, and the historical and social context of the affected parties. The court highlighted that it is inevitable for an ameliorative program to exclude certain disadvantaged groups. Moreover, the government is not obligated to meet the new "rational contribution" test, which would require proving that excluding a particular group is essential to achieving the program's objectives.

== See also ==
- substantive equality
