= Miron v Trudel =

- Supreme Court of Canada

Hearing: June 2, 1994 Judgment: May 25, 1995
- Full case name: John O Miron and Jocelyne Valliere v Richard Trudel, William James McIsaac and the Economical Mutual Insurance Company
- Citations: [1995] 2 S.C.R. 418
- Docket No.: 22744
- Ruling: Miron appeal allowed

Court membership
- Chief Justice: Antonio Lamer; Puisne Justices: Gérard La Forest, Claire L'Heureux-Dubé, John Sopinka, Charles Gonthier, Peter Cory, Beverley McLachlin, Frank Iacobucci, John C. Major

Reasons given
- Majority: McLachlin J. (paras. 119-), joined by Sopinka, Cory and Iacobucci JJ.
- Concurrence: L'Heureux‑Dubé J. (paras. 81-118)
- Dissent: Gonthier J. (paras. 1-80), joined by Lamer C.J. and La Forest and Major JJ.

Miron v Trudel, [1995] 2 S.C.R. 418 is a famous Supreme Court of Canada decision on equality rights under section 15 of the Canadian Charter of Rights and Freedoms where the Court found "marital status" was an analogous ground for discrimination (i.e., a characteristic which cannot legally be the basis for discrimination under section 15). The Court held that an insurance benefit provided only to married couples discriminated against common-law couples.

John Miron and Jocelyne Valliere were a common law couple. Miron suffered a car accident and attempted to claim the injuries under his partner's insurance policy. However, the Ontario Insurance Act provided that benefits were only available to spouses who were legally married.

Miron sued the insurance company arguing that he was discriminated against and that the Insurance Act violated section 15.

During the hearing before the Supreme Court, the Ontario government intervened specifically to concede that the Insurance Act violated section 15 and could not be saved by section 1. Chief Justice Lamer criticized Ontario counsel's refusal to defend the legislation and ordered Ian Binnie, a future Supreme Court justice to defend the legislation in place of and at the cost of the Ontario government.

In a five to four decision the Court found that there was a Charter violation and that it could not be saved under section 1 of the Charter.

The finding that common law marriages are protected by section 15 was repeated in Nova Scotia (Attorney General) v. Walsh (2002) and Hodge v. Canada (Minister of Human Resources Development) (2004). However, both these cases saw section 15 claims lose in the Supreme Court, as the justices decided that differential treatment based on marital status in these cases should not affect dignity.

== See also ==
- List of Supreme Court of Canada cases (Lamer Court)
