= Lovelace v Ontario =

- Supreme Court of Canada

Hearing: December 7, 1999 Judgment: July 20, 2000
- Full case name: Robert Lovelace and others v Her Majesty The Queen in right of Ontario
- Citations: {{{citations}}}
- Ruling: Lovelace appeal dismissed.

Court membership
- Chief Justice: Antonio Lamer; Puisne Justices: Claire L'Heureux-Dubé, Charles Gonthier, Beverley McLachlin, Frank Iacobucci, John C. Major, Michel Bastarache, Ian Binnie, Louise Arbour

Reasons given
- Unanimous reasons by: Iacobucci J.

Lovelace v Ontario, [2000] 1 S.C.R. 950, 2000 SCC 37, was the leading decision by the Supreme Court of Canada on section 15(2) of the Charter, which shields affirmative action programs from the equality requirement of section 15(1). The Court decided that distribution of casino profits to a select group of aboriginals is not discriminatory. The leading case on section 15(2) is R. v. Kapp, 2008 SCC 41.

== Background ==
In a deal made in the early 1990s, the Ontario government gave control of reserve-based gaming activities to several First Nations bands. By 1996 the government enacted the First Nations Fund, which restricts the distribution of profits from on-reserve casinos to First Nation bands registered under the Indian Act.

The petitioners were a group of non-registered First Nations bands who were status Indians. They claimed that they were discriminated against under section 15(1).

The Court of Appeal for Ontario ruled against the bands. The Court ruled that an exception under section 15(2) could be made for any discrimination claims as the purpose of the law was to improve the social and economic conditions of registered bands.

== Opinion of the Court ==
The unanimous Court decision was given by Iacobucci J. in which he ruled that the claimants failed to establish that the purpose of the First Nations Fund was based on a stereotype. The Fund had a clearly established ameliorative purpose that did not coincide with the claimants' needs and circumstances.

Iacobucci further examined the purpose of section 15(2). He described it as "confirmatory and supplementary" to section 15 jurisprudence. That is, the section must not be applied separately from section 15(1); rather, it should be used as a guide when analysing claims under section 15(1). Nevertheless, he left open the possibility of different applications of section 15(2) for future cases.

== See also ==
- List of Supreme Court of Canada cases (McLachlin Court)
