= Andrews v Law Society of British Columbia =

- Supreme Court of Canada

Hearing: October 5, 6, 1987 Judgment: February 2, 1989
- Full case name: The Law Society of British Columbia and The Attorney General of British Columbia (Appellants) and the Attorney General for Ontario, the Attorney General of Quebec, the Attorney General of Nova Scotia, the Attorney General for Saskatchewan, the Attorney General for Alberta, the Federation of Law Societies of Canada (Interveners) v Mark David Andrews and Gorel Elizabeth Kinersly (Respondents) and The Women's Legal Education and Action Fund, the Coalition of Provincial Organizations of the Handicapped, the Canadian Association of University Teachers and the Ontario Confederation of University Faculty Associations (Interveners)
- Citations: [1989] 1 SCR 143
- Docket No.: 19956
- Prior history: Judgment for Andrews and Kinersly in the Court of Appeal for British Columbia.
- Ruling: Appeal dismissed

Holding
- (1) A rule which bars an entire class of persons from certain forms of employment, solely on the grounds of a lack of citizenship status and without consideration of educational and professional qualifications or the other attributes or merits of individuals in the group, infringes section 15 equality rights. (2) The discriminatory measure cannot be justified under section 1 of the Charter

Court membership
- Chief Justice: Brian Dickson; Puisne Justices: Jean Beetz, Willard Estey, William McIntyre, Antonio Lamer, Bertha Wilson, Gerald Le Dain, Gérard La Forest, Claire L'Heureux-Dubé

Reasons given
- Plurality: Wilson (Dickson and L'Heureux-Dubé concurring)
- Concurrence: La Forest
- Dissent: McIntyre (Lamer concurring)
- Beetz and Estey took no part in the consideration or decision of the case.
- Le Dain did not participate in the final disposition of the judgment.

Andrews v Law Society of British Columbia, [1989] 1 SCR 143 is the first Supreme Court of Canada case to deal with the equality rights provided under section 15 of the Canadian Charter of Rights and Freedoms. British law graduate Mark David Andrews challenged the validity of section 42 of the Barristers and Solicitors Act of British Columbia, contending that the Canadian citizenship requirement for being called to the bar violated section 15 of the Charter.

The Supreme Court outlined a test, sometimes called the "Andrews test", to determine whether there has been a violation of equality rights. Andrews further held that discrimination according to grounds analogous to those enumerated in section 15 could result in a violation of the Charter.

== Background ==
Mark David Andrews (1959–2020) was a British international rower and a graduate of the Faculty of Law at the University of Oxford. In 1983, Andrews relocated to Vancouver with his Canadian spouse, both pursuing articling positions and completing the bar admission courses. While Andrews's spouse was called to the bar, as a permanent resident in Canada, Andrews himself was not. According to section 42 of British Columbia's Barristers and Solicitors Act the Law Society of British Columbia had the authority to call a person to the bar only if they were a Canadian citizen. However, at that time, the federal Citizenship Act required applicants for naturalization to meet various qualifications, including a residency requirement of living in Canada for three out of the four previous years. Andrews, who moved to Canada in 1983 did not meet that the requirement.

=== Supreme Court of British Columbia decision ===
Andrews filed a motion to challenge the validity of section 42 of the Barristers and Solicitors Act, contending that the Canadian citizenship requirement for being called to the bar violated section 15 of the Charter. He argued that this requirement resulted in the denial of equal treatment under the law for non-Canadian candidates, thereby discriminating against them based on their national origin. (Note: Andrews v. Law Society of British Columbia, 1985 CanLII 604 (BC SC), paras 20) Notably, British Columbia stood out among other provinces in Canada as it prohibited British subjects from being called to the bar, while most other provinces did not enforce such a restriction. (Note: Andrews v. Law Society of British Columbia, 1985 CanLII 604 (BC SC), paras 12)

In his decision, Justice Martin Rapson Taylor of the Supreme Court of British Columbia ruled that the citizenship requirement did not infringe upon the equality rights safeguarded by sections 15 and 7 of the Charter. (Note: Andrews v. Law Society of British Columbia, 1985 CanLII 604 (BC SC), paras 48) Justice Taylor ruled that the statute did not discriminate because it did not draw an "irrational or irrelevant distinction, or otherwise impose a disadvantage. (Note: Andrews v. Law Society of British Columbia, 1985 CanLII 604 (BC SC), paras 33) Taylor noted the requirement was rational as those entitled to practise law have "special commitment to the community which citizenship involves", and the delay to become a naturalized citizen provided time to gain knowledge of Canada to practise competently. (Note: Andrews v. Law Society of British Columbia, 1985 CanLII 604 (BC SC), paras 40) Further, the decision regarding whether citizenship should be a prerequisite for practicing law fell under the jurisdiction of the legislature. Because it was not deemed discriminatory under section 15 of the Charter, there was no need to consider the test of reasonable limits under section 1, although Taylor noted, if a section 1 limitation was considered, citizenship would have constituted a reasonable limitation. (Note: Andrews v. Law Society of British Columbia, 1985 CanLII 604 (BC SC), paras 44)

=== British Columbia Court of Appeal decision ===
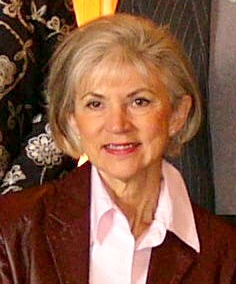
Andrew's appeal was heard by future Chief Justice of Canada Beverley McLachlin.

Andrews filed an appeal to the Taylor decision, arguing Taylor's definition of "discrimination" which included the requirement of "irrationality", which Andrews argued that if found would in fact constitute discrimination under section 15. (Note: Andrews v. Law Society of British Columbia, 1986 CanLII 1287 (BC CA) paras 11) Joseph Arvay argued the case for the Attorney General of British Columbia. (Note: Andrews v Law Society of British Columbia, [1989] 1 SCR 143.)

On appeal to the British Columbia Court of Appeal, Justice Beverley McLachlin authored a unanimous judgment overturning the previous ruling. (Note: Andrews v. Law Society of British Columbia, 1986 CanLII 1287 (BC CA) paras 59–60) McLachlin concluded that there was no compelling justification for the citizenship requirement in order to practise law, rendering it unreasonable, unfair, and a violation of equality rights under section 15 of the Charter. (Note: Andrews v. Law Society of British Columbia, 1986 CanLII 1287 (BC CA) para 53)

McLachlin pointed out that the requirement for citizenship was not historically established in British Columbia until 1971, it was only enforced in two other provinces, and was not a tradition of the British Commonwealth. (Note: Andrews v. Law Society of British Columbia, 1986 CanLII 1287 (BC CA) para 50) The argument that lawyers needed citizenship to fulfill their role as participants in government was dismissed, with McLachlin referring to the opinion of United States Supreme Court Justice Lewis F. Powell Jr. in re Griffiths (1973) 413 U.S. 717, which stated that lawyers do not become government officials solely by virtue of being lawyers. (Note: Andrews v. Law Society of British Columbia, 1986 CanLII 1287 (BC CA) para 47)

When evaluating whether the reasonable limits provision in section 1 of the Charter was applicable, McLachlin determined that the limitation imposed by the citizenship requirement was not reasonable. Specifically, the intended objective served by the requirement was not sufficiently justified, pressing, or substantial.

== Supreme Court judgment ==
=== Proceedings ===
The problem put to the court was whether the requirement of Canadian citizenship for admission to the British Columbia bar was an infringement upon or denial of the equality rights guaranteed by section 15(1) of the Charter, and if so, whether it was justified under section 1.

The importance of the case in regards to equality rights saw several interest groups seek and receive intervener status. A number of the interveners approached the case with the intent of arguing the merits of equality, but no position of the merits of Andrews or Kinersly's case.

Gorel Elizabeth Kinersly, an American citizen and permanent resident of Canada articling in British Columbia was added as a co-respondent in the appeal. Kinersly's addition ensured that the appeal would not become moot as Andrews was called to the British Columbia bar in 1986 following the Court of Appeal order, and became a Canadian citizen. Other interveners for the respondent included the Women's Legal Education and Action Fund, the Coalition of Provincial Organizations of the Handicapped, the Canadian Association of University Teachers, and the Ontario Confederation of University Faculty Associations.

For the appellant, the attorneys general for the provinces of Ontario, Quebec, Nova Scotia, Saskatchewan, and Alberta all intervened as of right, while the Federation of Law Societies of Canada was granted leave to intervene.

=== Structure of the decision ===
On February 2, 1989, the Supreme Court issued its decision in favour of Andrews. There were two steps to the court's Charter analysis: whether the citizenship requirement was discriminatory, contrary to section 15, and if so, whether the discriminatory provision could be upheld under section 1.

On the equality issue, the court unanimously held that the requirement was discriminatory, with the main analysis written by Justice McIntyre and adopted by all the judges.

However, the court split on the section 1 issue, with four of the six judges concluding that the citizenship requirement could not be justified as a reasonable limit on section 15's guarantee of equality. McIntyre disagreed and would have upheld the citizenship requirement. He was thus in dissent on the outcome of the case, but his section 15 analysis became the reasons of the court on section 15.

=== Section 15 analysis ===
==== Reasons of Justice McIntyre ====
Writing for himself and Justice Lamer, Justice McIntyre concluded that claims under section 15 would be assessed on three steps:

1. Was there actual differential treatment?
2. Was the differential treatment based on one of the enumerated prohibited grounds in section 15 or one that is analogous to those grounds?
3. Was the differential treatment discriminatory because of an imposed burden or denied benefit?

McIntyre first defined a general approach to the equality guarantee. He stated that section 15(1) is not a general guarantee of equality, rather it is only concerned with equal application of the law. He further held that not all differences in treatment will result in inequality, and that identical treatment may result in inequality.

He was critical of the concept of "similarly situated" which had emerged as the dominant way to address these cases in Canada, rejecting the concept. Similarly situated treats cases that are alike to other like cases, and unalike cases unalike. He reevaluated Bliss v Canada (AG), a pre-Charter Supreme Court case where a pregnant woman was denied employment benefits because all women were denied those benefits. He considered that was an example of the problems with such an approach. He further argued the "similarly situated" concept could be used to justify the Nuremberg laws.

Instead, McIntyre concentrated on section 15's prohibition on discrimination:

... discrimination may be described as a distinction, whether intentional or not but based on grounds relating to the personal characteristics of the individual or group which has the effect of imposing burdens, obligations, or disadvantages on such individual or group not imposed on others, or which withholds or limits access to opportunities, benefits, and advantages available to other members of society. Distinctions based on personal characteristics attributed to an individual solely on the basis of association with a group will rarely escape the charge of discrimination, while those based on an individual's merits and capacities will rarely be so classified.

McIntyre also stated the discrimination must be based on an "enumerated or analogous ground", and the individual seeking to strike down a law must demonstrate the existence of differential treatment based on either of the two grounds. From there the onus shifts to the Crown which must show the law justified under section 1. He went on to conclude that the citizenship requirement was discriminatory, and therefore infringed section 15 of the Charter. He summarised his position:

A rule which bars an entire class of persons from certain forms of employment, solely on the grounds of a lack of citizenship status and without consideration of educational and professional qualifications or the other attributes or merits of individuals in the group, would, in my view, infringe s. 15 equality rights.

==== Reasons of Justice Wilson ====
Justice Wilson, writing for herself, Chief Justice Dickson and Justice L'Heureux-Dubé, stated that she was in complete agreement with McIntyre on his section 15 analysis, and the relationship between section 15 and section 1.

==== Reasons of Justice La Forest ====
Justice La Forest wrote concurring reasons. On the main point in the section 15 analysis, he agreed with McIntyre that citizenship was a protected ground under section 15, and the citizenship requirement in issue was discriminatory.

=== Section 1 analysis ===
Although the court was unanimous on the section 15 issue, it split on the section 1 issue. Wilson, with Dickson and L'Heureux-Dubé concurring, held that the infringement of section 15 of the Charter could not be saved under section 1. They found that the citizenship requirement was not strongly linked to a person's capabilities to practice law, and so found it in violation of section 1

La Forest agreed that the infringement could not be justified under section 1. In his view, it failed the proportionality requirement of section 1. The practice of law is primarily a private profession, and most lawyers do not have any connection to government, which might support a citizenship requirement. Combined with Wilson's reasons, there was a majority in favour of allowing the appeal.

In dissent, McIntyre and Lamer disagreed with the majority on the section 1 analysis, believing the restriction could be upheld as a reasonable limit, and preferred to be deferential to the British Columbia Legislature.

== Legacy ==
Andrews was the leading case during the first decade of section 15 jurisprudence. By holding the phrase "in particular" in section 15 made the listed grounds non-exhaustive and recognizing citizenship as an analogous ground, the Court opened the door to include other historically marginalized groups that were not explicitly protected under that section such as members of Canada's LGBT community.

In the 1999 case Law v Canada (Minister of Employment and Immigration), the Supreme Court tightened the Andrews test, limiting burdensome differences in treatment to those that a reasonable person would say violated the claimant's dignity as a human being. This position was reversed by the Supreme Court in the 2008 case R v Kapp, back to the original test, but re-adjusted in Quebec (AG) v A in 2013 and again by Kahkewistahaw First Nation v Taypotat in 2015. However, much of the Andrews approach remained the same through these cases.
