= Law v Canada (Minister of Employment and Immigration) =

- Supreme Court of Canada

Hearing: January 20, 1998 December 3, 1998 Judgment: March 25, 1999
- Full case name: Nancy Law v Minister of Human Resources Development
- Citations: [1999] 1 SCR 497, 1999 CanLII 675, 170 DLR (4th) 1, 43 CCEL (2d) 49, 60 CRR (2d) 1
- Docket No.: 25374
- Ruling: The Canada Pension Plan did not violate the equality right under section 15(1) of the Charter.

Court membership
- Chief Justice: Antonio Lamer; Puisne Justices: Claire L'Heureux-Dubé, Charles Gonthier, Peter Cory, Beverley McLachlin, Frank Iacobucci, John C. Major, Michel Bastarache, Ian Binnie

Reasons given
- Unanimous reasons by: Iacobucci J

Law v Canada (Minister of Employment and Immigration), [1999] 1 SCR 497 is a leading Supreme Court of Canada decision on section 15 of the Canadian Charter of Rights and Freedoms. The ruling is notable because the court created the Law test, a significant new tool that has since been used by Canadian courts for determining the validity of equality rights claims under section 15. However, the Law test has since been discredited by the Supreme Court.

== Background ==
The case involved Nancy Law, a 30-year-old seeking survivor benefits under the Canada Pension Plan (CPP) which are limited only to people over age 35, disabled or with dependants at the time of the deceased's death. Otherwise, the survivor claimant is not entitled to benefits until he or she reaches age 65.

She appealed to the Pension Plan Review Tribunal on the basis the age requirement was in violation of her equality rights under section 15(1) of the Charter (which specifically names age as a grounds on which one has rights against discrimination). The tribunal held that the legislation did not violate Law's rights. The majority held that even if it did it would be justified under section 1 of the Charter. However, the dissenting opinion found that the age distinction was arbitrary and Parliament could have targeted those in need better. The Federal Court of Appeal upheld the tribunal's decision.

The question before the Supreme Court was "whether ss. 44(1)(d) and 58 of the Canada Pension Plan infringe s. 15(1) of the Charter on the ground that they discriminate on the basis of age against widows and widowers under the age of 35, and if so, whether this infringement is demonstrably justified in a free and democratic society under s. 1".

Prior to Law, there had been a sharp divide in the Court in the interpretation of the section 15 test established in Andrews v Law Society of British Columbia. The dispute culminated in this case where the test was reformulated to reflect both sides of the dispute.

== Reasons of the court ==
The unanimous court, in a judgement written by Iacobucci J, held that the Canada Pension Plan did not violate section 15(1).

Iacobucci examines the past cases on section 15, noting the ongoing dispute between the justices. However, there remains a consensus on the purpose and approach, which he enumerates.

First, the approach must not be mechanical, rather it should be flexible, purposive and contextual. The steps in the test must function as a point of reference, not strict guidelines, and must allow for expansion and modification by cases in the future. The analysis must be remedy oriented in order to properly identify and solve situation of discrimination.

Second, the analysis generally should focus on three issues.

1. whether a law imposes differential treatment between the claimant and others, in purpose or effect;
2. whether one or more enumerated or analogous grounds of discrimination are the basis for the differential treatment; and
3. whether the law in question has a purpose or effect that is discriminatory within the meaning of the equality guarantee.

Analysis of the issues should establish whether the law causes differential treatment, and then whether the differential treatment constitutes discrimination. From this Iacobucci formulates a new test to establish a discrimination claim.

=== Test ===
The test must make three broad inquiries.

(A) Does the impugned law (a) draw a formal distinction between the claimant and others on the basis of one or more personal characteristics, or (b) fail to take into account the claimant's already disadvantaged position within Canadian society resulting in substantively differential treatment between the claimant and others on the basis of one or more personal characteristics?

(B) Is the claimant subject to differential treatment based on one or more enumerated and analogous grounds? and

(C) Does the differential treatment discriminate, by imposing a burden upon or withholding a benefit from the claimant in a manner which reflects the stereotypical application of presumed group or personal characteristics, or which otherwise has the effect of perpetuating or promoting the view that the individual is less capable or worthy of recognition or value as a human being or as a member of Canadian society, equally deserving of concern, respect, and consideration?

The entire analysis must focus on the purpose of section 15 which is:

to prevent the violation of essential human dignity and freedom through the imposition of disadvantage, stereotyping, or political or social prejudice, and to promote a society in which all persons enjoy equal recognition at law as human beings or as members of Canadian society, equally capable and equally deserving of concern, respect and consideration.

To successfully make a claim, it must be established that the law, in purpose or effect, conflicts with the purpose of section 15.

=== Contextual factors ===
On the third stage of analysis, Iaccobucci enumerates four factors that should be considered. Their purpose are to establish if the law demeans their dignity. This must be done from a hybrid, subjective/objective, point of view. Namely, "that of the reasonable person, in circumstances similar to those of the claimant, who takes into account the contextual factors relevant to the claim".

The four factors are as follows:

1. Pre-existing disadvantage, stereotyping, prejudice, or vulnerability experienced by the individual or group at issue. The effects of a law as they relate to the important purpose of s. 15(1) in protecting individuals or groups who are vulnerable, disadvantaged, or members of "discrete and insular minorities" should always be a central consideration. Although the claimant's association with a historically more advantaged or disadvantaged group or groups is not per se determinative of an infringement, the existence of these pre-existing factors will favour a finding that s. 15(1) has been infringed.
2. The correspondence, or lack thereof, between the ground or grounds on which the claim is based and the actual need, capacity, or circumstances of the claimant or others. Although the mere fact that the impugned legislation takes into account the claimant's traits or circumstances will not necessarily be sufficient to defeat a s. 15(1) claim, it will generally be more difficult to establish discrimination to the extent that the law takes into account the claimant's actual situation in a manner that respects his or her value as a human being or member of Canadian society, and less difficult to do so where the law fails to take into account the claimant's actual situation.
3. The ameliorative purpose or effects of the impugned law upon a more disadvantaged person or group in society. An ameliorative purpose or effect which accords with the purpose of s. 15(1) of the Charter will likely not violate the human dignity of more advantaged individuals where the exclusion of these more advantaged individuals largely corresponds to the greater need or the different circumstances experienced by the disadvantaged group being targeted by the legislation. This factor is more relevant where the s. 15(1) claim is brought by a more advantaged member of society.
4. The nature and scope of the interest affected by the impugned law. The more severe and localized the consequences of the legislation for the affected group, the more likely that the differential treatment responsible for these consequences is discriminatory within the meaning of s. 15(1).

== Commentary ==
This case in some respects contradicted the earlier section 15 case Andrews v Law Society of British Columbia, in which it was ruled that differential, detrimental treatment directly affecting an enumerated or analogous ground constituted a violation of section 15, and that any discussion about the law's purpose or reasonableness should then take place in the section 1 analysis. As constitutional legal scholar Peter Hogg has written, by examining whether the challenged law undermines dignity while still looking at section 15, and not yet section 1, Law moved much of the analysis of the law's purpose and reasonableness from the traditional section 1 test, and into section 15. This means that a person who claims his section 15 rights are violated must himself prove his dignity was undermined.

Reactions to Law have been varied, but responses for the most part have been negative. The decision provoked many criticisms by legal scholars centered around the third stage of the section 15 analysis: the elusive concept of human dignity. In an attempt to move towards an understanding of equality as substantive rather than formal, the Court in Law replaced its earlier focus on analogous grounds in Andrews with one focused around the idea of human dignity. This has been criticized on a variety of grounds: it is a vague and abstract term, lacks coherence, is subjective, conflates multiple concepts, is a circular argument that begs the question of equality and has been imbued with undue importance and centrality in equality claims.

The human dignity test has notably been criticized for being a vague, abstract, and general term. The concept of human dignity has been characterized as being fundamentally inimical to equality claims analyses and has been deemed "…too abstract and general to demarcate the specific province of section 15 or to assist in resolving equality litigation." Similarly, criticisms have been levelled against the Court on the ground that the human dignity test is muddled and is not sufficiently coherent a concept so as to effectively address concerns of equality claimants. This confusion may be due to the circularity of the concept of human dignity as a factor to consider in equality claims. For example, the Court in Eldridge v British Columbia (AG) wrote that the purpose of section 15(1) was to express "a commitment … to the equal worth and human dignity of all persons". Human dignity cannot be both a factor in and a definition of equality. "Dignity requires respect, and respect is acknowledgment of human dignity." Another scholar identifies the same problem, arguing that harm to dignity is itself a type of harm, so it cannot be a factor in determining whether there has indeed been harm.

Many criticisms levelled against the focus on human dignity point to inconsistencies in the Supreme Court's own definition of the term. Iacobucci J has variously characterized the term as referring to "personal autonomy and self-determination", "physical and psychological integrity and empowerment", as well as "self-respect and self-worth", indicating a conflation of different understandings of equality. One scholar notes that this confusion "[forms] a haphazard amalgamation and intermingling of dignity", and that it is a disservice to our understanding of equality by failing to distinguish between human dignity and human interest. Similarly, the Court has at times linked the concept of dignity with the imposition of disadvantage and prejudice while at other times linked it with the redress of discrimination.

Substantially, the human dignity test has been widely criticized on the grounds that it sets a dangerous precedent for section 15 equality claims because its vague nature does not lend itself well to consistent and comprehensible application by the Court in the future, and because it puts forth a conception of equality that is formal rather than substantive. One scholar writes that "[t]he Courts' muddled and inconsistent application of human dignity suggests that it should be excised from Charter discourse altogether".

In attempting to address these concerns and on the heels of the controversial Law decision, scholars proposed various alternatives to the human dignity test. It was widely accepted that the section 15 claims were inadequately addressed using the previous formulations following Andrews, yet the Court's decision in Law was seen as inadequately addressing these concerns. One writer argued the Court should replace the human dignity test with a "reformulated grounds approach focused on human vulnerability and concrete human interests" that would be focused on individual and group vulnerability and which would take into account of a variety of factors, including the four enumerated contextual factors of the human dignity test. Another proposed an increased focus on the concept of accommodation, as this should, in any case, be the central focus of any section 15 claim. Yet another critic of the human dignity test proposed an understanding of human dignity reformulated as a concept of personal autonomy, an approach more favourable to empirical analyses and thus more coherent, and which is substantiated in part by the Supreme Court's own definition of human dignity.

Lastly, an analysis of case law reveals that the six section 15 claims to reach the Supreme Court immediately following the Law decision were all denied on the ground they did not fulfill the human dignity requirement. However, another analysis of section 15 claims reports that the success rate of claimants under Law was greater than the success rate under Andrews. One scholar has explained this phenomenon by suggesting Law did not create a new test of human dignity, but rather that the court crystallized a pre-existing yet implicit criterion into law. That said, a disproportionately high number of section 15 claims under Law fail at this third stage of the test (63.6%).

=== Supreme Court response to criticisms of Law ===
In R v Kapp, the Supreme Court addressed these widespread criticisms of the human dignity test:

But as critics have pointed out, human dignity is an abstract and subjective notion that, even with the guidance of the four contextual factors, cannot only become confusing and difficult to apply; it has also proven to be an additional burden on equality claimants, rather than the philosophical enhancement it was intended to be. Criticism has also accrued for the way Law has allowed formalism of some of the Court’s post-Andrews jurisprudence to resurface in the form of an artificial comparator analysis focussing on treating likes alike.

While the Supreme Court noted these criticisms, it did not explicitly reject human dignity as a factor in equality claims. It noted the centrality of the concept but read down the Law decision by noting that the human dignity test should not be seen as a separate and straightforward criterion or test. Rather, the Court implied that the concept of human dignity should instead be considered generally as an important factor in deciding s. 15 equality claims and that it should remain a central idea.

Moreover, despite many claims that Law furthered a formalistic understanding of equality at the expense of substantive equality, the Supreme Court in Kapp explicitly noted that the human dignity test and the Law decision in general confirmed "Andrews’ interpretation of s. 15 as a guarantee of substantive, and not just formal equality. Moreover, Law made an important contribution to our understanding of the conceptual underpinnings of substantive equality."

== See also ==
- List of Supreme Court of Canada cases
