= Reference re Remuneration of Judges (No 2) =

Reference Re Remuneration of Judges (No 2)
- Supreme Court of Canada

Hearing: January 19, 1998 Judgment: February 10, 1998
- Full case name: Reference Re Remuneration of Judges of the Provincial Court of Prince Edward Island; Reference Re Independence and Impartiality of Judges of the Provincial Court of Prince Edward Island
- Citations: [1998] 1 S.C.R. 3; 1998 CanLII 833 (S.C.C.); [1998] 161 Nfld. & P.E.I.R. 125; (1998), 155 D.L.R. (4th) 1; (1998), 121 C.C.C. (3d) 474; (1998), 49 C.R.R. (2d) 1; (1998), 50 Admin. L.R. (2d) 273; (1998), 126 Man. R. (2d) 97
- Prior history: None (rehearing)

Holding
- The doctrine of necessity states those tried under dependent tribunals in this case have not been denied their rights to an independent tribunal.

Court membership
- Chief Justice: Antonio Lamer; Puisne Justices: Claire L'Heureux-Dubé, Charles Gonthier, Peter Cory, Beverley McLachlin, Frank Iacobucci, John C. Major, Michel Bastarache, Ian Binnie

Reasons given
- Unanimous reasons by: Lamer

Reference Re Remuneration of Judges (No 2) [1998] 1 S.C.R. 3 was a decision by the Supreme Court of Canada addressing questions regarding the 1997 Provincial Judges Reference, also known as Re Remuneration of Judges. Since the Supreme Court, in 1997, found independent committees were needed to help determine judicial salaries, the Court now had to address challenges regarding the creation of such committees.

== Background ==
In the Provincial Judges Reference of 1997, the Court found that Alberta, Manitoba and Prince Edward Island's remuneration of Provincial Court judges was unconstitutional, since it breached a requirement for judicial independence. The Court said that independent salary commissions were needed to help recommend salaries, and governments could deviate from these recommendations only with rational reasons. Since Alberta and Prince Edward Island did not have such commissions, while Manitoba did but did not consult its commission, their actions regarding remuneration were deemed invalid.

The decision created certain challenges, and the governments of Alberta, Manitoba and Prince Edward Island had to approach the Court again for a solution. Since section 11(d) of the Canadian Charter of Rights and Freedoms guarantees a right to be tried before an independent tribunal, and in 1997 the Court decided the Provincial Courts of these three provinces were not independent, the decision threw many criminal law cases into question. Moreover, some governments needed time to set up commissions.

== Decision ==
The Supreme Court's opinion was written by Chief Justice Antonio Lamer, who had also authored the 1997 Reference. He declined to give a declaration that the criminal law decisions by Provincial Courts should be considered constitutional, since they would be constitutional anyway. Lamer's finding was that, according to the "doctrine of necessity", a judge who is not impartial can hear a case when no impartial judge is available. He wrote, "The law recognizes that in some situations a judge who is not impartial and independent is preferable to no judge at all." Lamer then held that this doctrine went back to 1430, when judges considered a challenge against themselves. This was allowed since there was no court besides their own that could hear the case. Lamer also concluded the doctrine was used, albeit not overtly, in Beauregard v. Canada (1986), since the Supreme Court had to consider its own independence, as well as that of other Canadian courts. However, the Court in 1998 cited Laws v Australian Broadcasting Tribunal, a decision by the High Court of Australia, to say the doctrine was limited. It should not be used where it would lead to considerable injustice, and it should not be used more than necessity dictates. If these conditions are not followed, Lamer said, the doctrine would "gravely undermine" section 11(d). In all, Lamer acknowledged, this was a situation in which "finality and continuity" were needed over fairness, and section 11(d) does not provide total fairness.

Regarding the facts of this case, Lamer said that for a decision to be challenged there needed to be evidence of considerable injustice. Lamer noted the Provincial Court judges could not be blamed for their lack of independence, and they had to continue working under the Criminal Code and because some defendants chose to come before Provincial Court judges. Regarding Prince Edward Island, the Court found it could not make a declaration that the criminal cases should be upheld for another reason. Namely, the Prince Edward Island aspect of the Re Remuneration of Judges was brought before the Supreme Court in the form of a reference question. Reference questions are cases in which the Supreme Court gives non-binding opinions; thus, Prince Edward Island's actions were not found unconstitutional in a binding way.

The Court then considered whether it should give provincial governments more time to set up the salary commissions and receive recommendations. The Court decided it should delay the requirement of commissions until September 18, 1998, one year after the 1997 Reference.

== Aftermath ==
In a subsequent judicial independence case, Mackin v. New Brunswick (2002), the Supreme Court found a government action unconstitutional for not following the Provincial Judges Reference, although the action predated the reference. The action also came before September 18, 1998, the day the commission requirement became effective according to Re Remuneration of Judges (No. 2). However, the Supreme Court replied in Mackin that the 1998 decision was merely meant to keep courts running; unconstitutional remuneration was still considered unconstitutional prior to September 18, 1998. Thus, the Court in Mackin found the government actions unconstitutional.

== See also ==
- List of Supreme Court of Canada cases (Lamer Court)
- Valente v R
- Mackeigan v Hickman
- R. v Généreux
- Provincial Court Judges' Assn of New Brunswick v New Brunswick (Minister of Justice)
