= R v Askov =

Supreme Court of Canada case

- Supreme Court of Canada

Hearing: March 23, 1990 Judgment: October 18, 1990
- Full case name: Elijah Anton Askov, Ralph Hussey, Samuel Gugliotta and Edward Melo v. Her Majesty The Queen
- Citations: [1990] 2 S.C.R. 1199
- Docket No.: 20560
- Prior history: On appeal from the Court of Appeal for Ontario
- Ruling: Askov appeal allowed; proceedings stayed

Holding
- Principles determined regarding whether the delay to have a trial is unreasonable under section 11(b) of the Canadian Charter of Rights and Freedoms.

Court membership
- Chief Justice: Brian Dickson; Puisne Justices: Antonio Lamer, Bertha Wilson, Gérard La Forest, Claire L'Heureux-Dubé, John Sopinka, Charles Gonthier, Peter Cory, Beverley McLachlin

Reasons given
- Majority: Cory J., joined by Dickson C.J. and La Forest, L'Heureux‑Dubé and Gonthier JJ.
- Concurrence: McLachlin J.
- Concurrence: Sopinka J.
- Concurrence: Wilson J.
- Concurrence: Lamer J.

R v Askov, [1990] 2 S.C.R. 1199, is a 1990 appeal heard before the Supreme Court of Canada which established the criteria and standards by which Canadian courts judge whether an accused's right to a speedy trial under the Canadian Charter of Rights and Freedoms, Section 11(b) "to be tried within a reasonable time" has been infringed.

The appellants argued successfully that criminal charges against them should be stayed on the grounds that their trial had been unreasonably delayed, contrary to the Charter's guarantee under Section 11(b) that "Any person charged with an offence has the right... to be tried within a reasonable time." Disagreeing with the Court of Appeal for Ontario, the Supreme Court found that the delays were indeed unreasonable and directed a stay of proceedings against the appellants. Thousands of pending criminal cases were consequently dismissed on similar grounds.

== Background ==
Appellants Askov, Hussey and Gigliotti were initially charged with conspiracy to commit extortion and related offences in November 1983. A date early in July 1984 was agreed on for the preliminary hearing, but the hearing was not completed until September. A trial date was set for October 1985, but the case could not be accommodated during this session, and the trial was delayed until September 1986, nearly two years after the conclusion of the preliminary hearing.

When the trial began, the accused moved for a stay of proceedings on the grounds of unreasonable delay. The trial judge, Michael George Bolan, granted the stay, finding longstanding, uncorrected institutional problems were the major cause of the delay. Crown attorney appealed the stay to the Court of Appeal, which set aside the stay, finding: "(1) that there was no misconduct on the part of the Crown resulting in the delay or any part of it; (2) that there was no indication of any objection by any of the appellants to any of the adjournments; (3) that there was no evidence of any actual prejudice to the appellants caused by the delay." R. v. Askov [1990] 2 S.C.R., at p. 1207

== The Ruling ==
In siding with the appellants, the Court drew on the decision of the United States Supreme Court in Barker v. Wingo, 407 U.S. 514 (1972) in addition to previous Canadian Supreme Court decisions in R. v. Rahey, [1987] 1 S.C.R. 588, Mills v. The Queen, [1986] 1 S.C.R. 863 and R. v. Conway, [1989] 1 S.C.R. 1659 in setting out four factors to consider when deciding whether the delay in bringing an accused to trial has been unreasonable:

- the length of the delay
  - as delays become longer they become more difficult to excuse
  - very lengthy delays are prima facie excessive and cannot be excused
  - complex cases may justify longer delays
  - delays owing to actions of the Crown weigh in favour of the accused
- the explanation for the delay
  - delays owing to inadequate institutional resources weigh against the Crown
  - the burden to justify such a delay falls upon the Crown
  - in determining whether such a delay is reasonable, the jurisdiction in question may be compared to others in the country, using obtaining conditions in better, not worse, districts as a standard of comparison
- a waiver of the right by the accused
  - a waiver of the right by the accused may justify the delay, but the waiver must be “informed, unequivocal and freely given”
- prejudice to the accused
  - in the absence of a waiver, when a trial has been substantially delayed a certain prejudice to the interest of the accused may be inferred where it is not rebutted by the Crown

The justices agreed that the specific guarantees provided by Section 11 of the Charter ought to be understood primarily as supporting the fundamental justice provisions of Section 7, but while Justices Cory and McLachlin found in Section 11(b) a broader societal or communitarian interest in the principle of timely justice, Justices Dickson, Lamer and Sopinka found in this section only an individual right touching the interest of an accused.

== See also ==
- List of Supreme Court of Canada cases (Lamer Court)
