= Bail in Canada =

Legal process in Canada

Bail in Canada refers to the release (or detention) of a person charged with a criminal offence prior to being tried in court or sentenced. The Canadian Bill of Rights and the Canadian Charter of Rights and Freedoms guarantee the right not to be denied reasonable bail without just cause. That right is implemented by the Criminal Code, which provides several ways for a person to be released prior to a court appearance. A person may be released by a peace officer or by the courts. A release by the courts is officially known as a judicial interim release. There are also a number of ways to compel a person's appearance in court without the need for an arrest and release.

== History ==
The Canadian law of bail is derived from the principles of bail which evolved in the English common law. In particular, the right to be released without excessive bail was enshrined in the English Bill of Rights, which was part of the law of the colonies in British North America.

Prior to Confederation in 1867, the individual colonies each had the authority to enact local laws relating to bail. After 1867, the Parliament of Canada acquired exclusive jurisdiction over the criminal law, including the law of bail. The first major federal legislation with respect to bail was included in the criminal legislation package of 1869. In that law, the federal government made bail discretionary for all offences. This provision was subsequently subject to much judicial interpretation, as it made the granting of bail highly discretionary for each justice of the peace. It also placed considerable emphasis on cash bail, making release on bail dependent on the individual's financial resources, rather than factors such as likelihood of appearing to answer the charges.

The next major statutory change to bail in Canada was the 1960 Canadian Bill of Rights which provided for a "right to reasonable bail". This provision was subsequently used by the courts to rule, for the first time, that the Extradition Act included a right to bail.

In the early 1970s, the procedure for granting bail in Canada was completely revised by the Bail Reform Act, which extensively amended the bail provisions of the Criminal Code. This act placed the onus for justifying an accused's detention on the prosecutor, gave police new powers to release persons charged with an offence prior to their coming before a justice, and created detailed procedures for bail reviews.

In 1982, the Canadian Charter of Rights and Freedoms enshrined the right to bail in the Canadian constitution. Section 11(e) of the Charter stipulated that "any person charged with an offence has the right ... not to be denied reasonable bail without just cause". This was subsequently used by the Supreme Court of Canada to strike out bail provisions of the Criminal Code which the court held to be excessively vague in R v Morales.

Another important reform occurred in R v Zora, a 2020 Supreme Court ruling, which found that breaching bail has a subjective, not objective, mens rea. In other words, a person cannot be convicted of breaching bail conditions because of an accident or mistake, but only because of intentionally or recklessly breaching the bail conditions. Zora also took aim at the common practice of routinely imposing multiple conditions on bail; it emphasized that "the default form of bail is to release accused persons based on an undertaking to attend trial, without any conditions restricting their activities or actions" and that any conditions must be the minimum necessary to address the specific risk factors presented by the individual accused.

== Process to compel attendance without an arrest ==
The Criminal Code provides two ways that a person can be brought before the courts without first requiring an arrest: an appearance notice, issued by the police officer, or a summons, issued by a Provincial Court judge or justice of the peace. Failure to comply with an appearance notice or summons can result in an arrest warrant being issued, and possibly further charges for failure to appear or comply with conditions.

=== Appearance notice ===
In certain cases, a peace officer can choose to issue an appearance notice to a person, instead of arresting the person. There are three conditions for issuing an appearance notice: (1) the peace officer must have reasonable grounds to believe that a person has committed a summary conviction offence, a hybrid offence, or an offence within the absolute jurisdiction of a judge of a Provincial Court, (2) be satisfied on reasonable grounds that an arrest is not necessary to establish the identity of the person, secure or preserve evidence, or prevent the continuation of the offence or the commission of another offence, and (3) there are no reasonable grounds to believe the person will fail to attend court.

An appearance notice directs the accused to appear in court on a given date. When the accused is alleged to have committed an indictable offence, the appearance notice can also require the accused to report for fingerprinting and photographing under the Identification of Criminals Act.

An appearance notice must be subsequently confirmed by a justice of the peace.

=== Summons ===
Alternatively, where a peace officer believes on reasonable grounds that a person has committed an indictable offence, the peace officer can lay an information before a Provincial Court judge or a justice of the peace. If the judge or justice of the peace is satisfied grounds exist, they can issue a summons requiring an accused to appear in court on a given date. The summons can also require the person to report for fingerprinting and photographing under the Identification of Criminals Act.

== Release by police after arrest ==
Police officers have a number of options to release an accused subsequent to their arrest but without the accused having to attend court for a release hearing. Failure to comply with these requirements can result in an arrest warrant being issued, and possibly further charges for failure to appear or comply with conditions.

=== Release by arresting officer ===
The officer who arrests the person can release them on an appearance notice or with the intention to apply to a justice of the peace for a summons, as described above.

=== Release by officer in charge ===
Alternatively, the officer who arrests the person can take the person to the officer in charge of the facility where the person is being held, who then has powers to release the person. The release can include a requirement that the person appear for photographing and fingerprinting under the Identification of Criminals Act. Unlike the arresting officer, the officer in charge can impose additional conditions on the release in certain cases, in the form of undertakings.

==== Summons or promise to appear ====
The officer in charge can release the person with the intention to apply for a summons, or can issue a promise to appear, which is similar to an appearance notice.

==== Recognizance ====
The officer in charge can require the individual to enter into a recognizance, committing the person to pay up to $500 if the person fails to appear in court. No sureties are required. The person does not actually need to deposit the money with the officer in charge, unless the person is not ordinarily resident in the province or within 200 kilometres of the place of custody.

==== Undertaking to an officer in charge ====
The accused can enter into an undertaking to an officer in charge to abide by certain conditions while they are on a release, in addition to any other conditions of release. An undertaking can have one or more of the following conditions:

- to remain within a territorial jurisdiction,
- to notify the officer of any change of address, employment, or occupation,
- to abstain from communicating directly or indirectly with certain individuals,
- to abstain from attending certain locations,
- to deposit their passport,
- to abstain from possessing any firearm and to surrender any firearm licences,
- to report at certain times to the police,
- to abstain from the consumption of alcohol or other intoxicating substances,
- to abstain from the consumption of drugs except in accordance with a medical prescription, and
- to comply with any other condition the officer in charge considers necessary to ensure the safety and security of any complainant or witness.

== Release hearing ==
If the police do not release an arrested person, there must be a judicial hearing, formally known as an application for "judicial interim release". Depending on the circumstances and the offence, the hearing may be held before a justice of the peace, a Provincial Court judge, or a judge of the superior trial court of the province. The justice or judge can order the detention of the person, or the release on various conditions. Failure to comply with the conditions of release can result in an arrest warrant being issued, or additional charges for failure to appear or failure to comply with conditions.

=== Timing ===
The police must bring the arrested person before a justice of the peace (which can include a Provincial Court judge) without unreasonable delay and in any event within 24 hours of the arrest. If a justice is not available within 24 hours, the police must bring the person before a justice as soon as possible. The justice can then conduct a release hearing.

The exception is if the person is charged with particularly serious offences, such as murder or treason. The justice of the peace must issue a warrant of committal, authorising detention until dealt with by a superior court trial judge.

The hearing may be adjourned by the justice, or on the request of the arrested person or the Crown prosecutor or police officer. However, if the defence does not consent to the adjournment, the justice cannot adjourn the hearing for more than 3 days. If the hearing is adjourned, the justice may order the accused not to communicate with certain individuals while the accused is detained.

=== Grounds for detention ===
There are three different grounds for detaining an accused prior to sentence. They are commonly referred to as primary grounds, secondary grounds, and tertiary grounds.

Primary grounds refers to whether detention is necessary to ensure the accused's attendance in court. Considerations include the accused's criminal history, their behaviour in the matter before the court, their connections (or lack of) with the jurisdiction, and the type of offences before the court.

Secondary grounds refers to whether detention is necessary for the protection or safety of the public. This includes whether there is a substantial likelihood the accused will commit a further offence or interfere with the administration of justice.

Tertiary grounds refers to whether detention is necessary to maintain confidence in the administration of justice, and is generally reserved for very serious offences. The four factors to consider are:

- the apparent strength of the prosecutor's case,
- the seriousness of the offence,
- the circumstances surrounding the offence, including whether a firearm was used, and
- if found guilty, whether the accused is liable to a potentially lengthy term of imprisonment, or if a firearm was involved, faces a minimum of 3 year of jail.

=== Burden of proof ===
Generally, the Crown prosecutor has the burden to show on a balance of probabilities why the accused should be detained. However, the prosecutor may consent to the release of an accused on conditions imposed by the justice. Similarly, the accused may concede that the prosecutor can show cause (or if the accused has the burden of proof, indicate they do want to show cause why they should be released) and consent to their detention.

While the onus of proof is normally on the Crown prosecutor, the accused has the burden to show why they should be released, also known as "reverse onus" if they are charged with the following offences:

- an offence committed while at large on a release,
- an offence committed at the direction or in association with a criminal organization,
- a terrorism offence,
- certain offences under the Security of Information Act,
- a weapons trafficking offence,
- certain violent offences (including attempted murder) where a firearm was used,
- an offence that involved a firearm, crossbow, restricted weapon, or prohibited weapon while under a weapons prohibition,
- any offence if the accused is not an ordinary resident of Canada,
- an offence of failing to comply with release conditions or failing to attend court, or
- certain offences under the Controlled Drugs and Substances Act that carry the possibility of a life sentence.

If an accused is ordered detained, the court may order that they not communicate with certain individuals while they are in custody awaiting their trial and sentencing.

=== Evidence ===
The standard of evidence in a release hearing is trustworthy and credible, and can include hearsay. This can include a summary of the alleged offence and any witness statements. The court is allowed to consider other offences the accused has been charged with but is still awaiting trial for.

As with all other criminal proceedings, it is optional for the accused to testify. If the accused does testify, they cannot be cross-examined on the offence before the court unless the accused testifies about the offence itself. This only applies to the offence the accused is charged with and not with other offences committed by the accused. The rule does not apply to any other witnesses in the hearing.

=== Types of release ===
If the court is satisfied that the accused should be released, there are a number of options available: an undertaking, a recognizance with or without sureties, or recognizance with a deposit. The court can impose additional conditions on each of these types of release. Failure to comply with the conditions of release can result in an arrest warrant being issued, or additional charges for failure to appear or failure to comply with conditions.

==== Undertaking ====
A basic undertaking only requires the accused to appear in court as directed by the undertaking.

==== Recognizance without sureties and without deposit ====
A recognizance requires an accused to attend court as directed by the recognizance. The recognizance can be for any amount the court determines would be appropriate based on all of the circumstances (the accused's financial situation, the circumstances of the offence, the likelihood of the recognizance not being complied with, and similar factors).

If the accused does not comply with the recognizance, a judge can order the amount of the recognizance to be forfeited to the Crown.

==== Recognizance with sureties and without deposit ====
The court may require that sureties (persons similar to co-signers on a loan) be added to the recognizance. The court has the ability to name specific individuals as sureties. Sureties can apply to the court to be relieved of their obligations. This will usually result in the accused being arrested and held for a new release hearing.

==== Recognizance with deposit and without sureties ====
Another option is release on recognizance with deposit of money or valuable securities by the accused, but without sureties. This option requires the consent of the prosecutor.

==== Recognizance if not ordinary resident ====
If the accused is not an ordinary resident of the province where they are in custody, or they do not ordinarily reside within 200 kilometres of the place where they are in custody, the court can require that they deposit a sum of money or valuable security. Sureties are an option in this situation.

==== No bail bondsmen or insurance ====
There is no commercial business of bail bondsman or bail insurance in Canada. Standing surety for a fee is a criminal offence, as is agreeing to indemnify a surety. Both are considered obstruction of justice.

=== Conditions of release ===
The court can impose conditions on release, requiring the accused to comply with one or more of the following conditions:

- report at a certain time to the police,
- remain within the territorial jurisdiction,
- notify the police of any change of address, employment, or occupation,
- abstain from communicating, directly or indirectly with certain individuals,
- refrain from attending certain locations,
- deposit their passport,
- comply with any other condition the court considers necessary to ensure the safety of any victim or witness, and
- comply with any other reasonable condition the court considers desirable.

If the accused is charged with one of the following offences, the court is required to prohibit the accused from possessing any firearm, crossbow, restricted weapon, or prohibited weapon, unless the court considers that such an order is not required:

- an offence with the commission of violence, attempted violence, or the threat of violence,
- a terrorism offence,
- criminal harassment,
- intimidation of a justice system participant (victim, witness, etc.),
- certain offences under the Controlled Drugs and Substances Act,
- an offence that involves a firearm, crossbow, restricted weapon, or prohibited weapon, or
- certain offences under the Security of Information Act.

If the accused is charged with one of the following offences, the court is required to consider whether conditions are necessary to protect the victim or witnesses of the offence:

- a terrorism offence,
- criminal harassment,
- intimidation of justice system participant,
- an offence with the commission of violence, attempted violence, or the threat of violence, or
- certain offences under the Security of Information Act.

=== Publication bans ===
Either party can request a publication ban on all evidence and reasons given in a release hearing until the charges are resolved. If the publication ban is requested by the defence it is automatic. The provision for a mandatory publication ban has been challenged as infringing the constitutional guarantee of freedom of expression, but the Supreme Court of Canada upheld the provision, on the basis that its purpose was to protect the accused's right to a fair trial, which is also a constitutional guarantee.

== Revocation of release ==
If a police officer has reasonable grounds that an accused has or is about to contravene any type of release, the officer can arrest the individual, who must be brought before a justice for a hearing. If the prosecutor proves a contravention of the conditions, the justice must revoke the original release order. If the justice revokes the release order, a new hearing is held and the accused bears the onus on to show cause why detention is not necessary.

Any type of release can also be revoked by the trial judge on application by the Crown or, in limited circumstances, on the court's own motion. The accused is then arrested and faces a hearing for judicial interim release as though the accused has just been arrested for the original offence.

== Variation ==
A recognizance or undertaking can be varied at any time with the written consent of the prosecutor.

An order for release or detention can be vacated and replaced without a review or appeal being required in the following situations:

- by the trial judge,
- by the preliminary inquiry judge (except when the accused is charged with murder or other serious offences within the exclusive jurisdiction of the superior trial court), or
- with the consent of the defence and prosecution.

== Review of order ==
=== Application for review ===
When a justice or court makes an order for the release or detention of the accused, or varies such an order, either party can bring an application to a superior trial court judge to review the order, and if necessary vacate and replace it. Once a decision is made, both parties must wait 30 days before being allowed to make another application.

=== Automatic review ===
If an accused is ordered detained (either at a bail hearing or after a bail review application), an automatic bail review is made by a superior court judge after a prescribed period of time. For summary conviction offence, the period is 30 days from the date the detention order was made. For indictable offences, the period is 90 days from the date the detention order was made. Besides being able to vacate and replace the order, the judge can also make directions to expedite the accused's trial.

== Murder and other serious offences ==
The system is different for individuals charged with one of the following offences:

- murder,
- treason,
- intimidating Parliament or a legislature,
- inciting to mutiny,
- seditious offences,
- piracy or piratical acts.

These offences are within the exclusive jurisdiction of the superior trial courts, and therefore the applications for judicial interim release are decided by those courts.

When a person is charged with one of these offences, the police officer must bring the person before a justice of the peace, under the same time limits as any other arrested person. However, instead of conducting a hearing, the justice of the peace is required to issue a warrant of committal, to last until the person is dealt with according to law.

If the accused seeks release, they must apply to a judge of the superior trial court for a release hearing. Notably, the onus of proof is on the accused to show cause why they should be released. In other respects, the same rules for release apply.

Any review of an order made by the superior court trial judge is heard by the provincial Court of Appeal.

== Young persons charged with offences ==
The Youth Criminal Justice Act governs criminal proceedings for young persons under the age of 18 who are charged with criminal offences under the Criminal Code. The Code provisions respecting release hearings generally apply for young persons, with some exceptions or special rules which take into account the age and capacity of the young person.

Youth courts are prohibited from detaining youth prior to sentencing as a substitute for appropriate child protection, mental health, or other social measures.

The Crown bears the onus of proof for detention. The conditions which the Crown must satisfy are somewhat stricter than is the case for an adult. For example, detention can only be ordered if the young person is charged with a serious offence, or faces outstanding charges.

If the youth court concludes the young person should be detained, the youth court can order that the young person be detained in a place of temporary custody, designated for young persons. Alternatively, the youth court can inquire whether there is a responsible person who can exercise control over the young person, and that the young person is willing to be placed in that person's care. If so, both the responsible person and the young person enter into an undertaking with conditions.

It is a criminal offence for the young person to not comply with the undertaking. Unlike a surety, the responsible person faces no financial penalty. Instead, the responsible person also faces a criminal offence if they wilfully fail to comply with the undertaking.

== See also ==
- Criminal law of Canada
