= R v Rahey =

- Supreme Court of Canada

Hearing: June 17, 1986 Judgment: May 14, 1987
- Docket No.: 18906
- Ruling: Appeal granted, proceeding stayed

Court membership
- Chief Justice: Brian Dickson; Puisne Justices: Jean Beetz, Willard Estey, William McIntyre, Julien Chouinard, Antonio Lamer, Bertha Wilson, Gerald Le Dain, Gérard La Forest

Reasons given
- Plurality: Lamer J., joined by Dickson C.J.
- Concurrence: Wilson J., joined by Estey J.
- Concurrence: Le Dain J., joined by Beetz J.
- Concurrence: La Forest J., joined by McIntyre J.
- Chouinard J. took no part in the consideration or decision of the case.

Laws applied
- Mills v. The Queen, [1986] 1 S.C.R. 863

R v Rahey, [1987] 1 S.C.R. 588 is a constitutional decision of the Supreme Court of Canada. The accused challenged a delay of over eleven months on an application for a directed verdict as violation of the right to a trial within a reasonable time under section 11(b) of the Charter. The Court found that there was a violation of section 11(b) and granted a stay of proceedings.

== Background ==
Carl Rahey was charged with filing false tax returns and tax evasion. His assets were put in receivership. His trial began and after the closing of the Crown's argument, in December 1982 the defence applied for a directed verdict. Over a period of nine months the judge delayed issuing a decision. In September 1983, the defence applied to dismiss the charges as a violation of Rahey's right to trial in a reasonable time under section 11(b) of the Charter. The next day the trial judge issued his decision rejecting the application for a directed verdict.

The application for dismissal was granted. On appeal the charges were reinstated.

There were three issues put to the Supreme Court:

1. whether the Supreme Court of Nova Scotia was a court of competent jurisdiction for the purposes of an application under s. 24(1) of the Charter;
2. whether appellant's right to be tried under a reasonable time was infringed; and, if so,
3. whether the superior court judge properly exercised her jurisdiction in dismissing the charges because of the unreasonable delay of the trial judge.

== Judgment of the Supreme Court ==
The majority allowed the appeal and issued a stay of proceedings. There were four separate reasons written.

== See also ==
- List of Supreme Court of Canada cases
