= R v Mills (disambiguation) =

There are a number of Court cases by the name R. v. Mills:

- R v Mills (1838), a decision of the Supreme Court of New South Wales
- Mills v R, [1986] 1 S.C.R. 863, a decision of the Supreme Court of Canada relating to the right to a trial within a reasonable time
- R v Mills, [1999] 3 S.C.R. 668, a decision of the Supreme Court of Canada, upholding the Rape Shield law
