= R v Généreux =

- Supreme Court of Canada

Hearing: June 5, 1991 Judgment: February 13, 1992
- Full case name: Michel Généreux v Her Majesty The Queen
- Citations: [1992] 1 S.C.R. 259
- Prior history: Appeal from the Court Martial Appeal Court of Canada
- Ruling: Appeal allowed, new trial ordered

Court membership
- Chief Justice: Antonio Lamer; Puisne Justices: Gérard La Forest, Claire L'Heureux-Dubé, John Sopinka, Charles Gonthier, Peter Cory, Beverley McLachlin, William Stevenson, Frank Iacobucci

Reasons given
- Majority: Lamer, joined by Sopinka, Gonthier, Cory and Iacobucci
- Concurrence: Stevenson, joined by La Forest and McLachlin
- Dissent: L'Heureux‑Dubé

Laws applied
- R v Wigglesworth, [1987] 2 S.C.R. 541; Andrews v Law Society of British Columbia, [1989] 1 S.C.R. 143

R v Généreux, [1992] 1 S.C.R. 259 is a leading Supreme Court of Canada decision where the Court ruled that the military court martial system must comply with the constitutional requirements for judicial independence under section 11(d) of the Canadian Charter of Rights and Freedoms.

== Background ==
Michel Généreux was a corporal in the Canadian Forces. He was charged with drug possession for the purpose of trafficking in violation of section 4 of the Narcotics Control Act and for desertion in violation of section 88(1) of the National Defence Act.

In the General Court Martial he was convicted for both offences, which was upheld in the Court Martial Appeal Court.

The issue before the Supreme Court was whether the General Court Martial was an independent and impartial tribunal under section 11(d) of the Charter.

== Majority decision ==
The Court examined the requirements for judicial independence established in Valente v. The Queen [1985]. The majority found that the judges on the military court did not have sufficient security of tenure or administrative autonomy, which left them vulnerable to interference from the military and government. Consequently, the majority found that the accused's right to an independent and fair tribunal under section 11(d) of the Charter was violated.

== Aftermath ==
The decision brought about many changes to the military courts. The Government of Canada commissioned recently retired Chief Justice Brian Dickson to write a report to recommend changes to the courts which were eventually incorporated into the 1998 National Defence Act.

== See also ==
- List of Supreme Court of Canada cases (Lamer Court)
- Beauregard v Canada
- Mackeigan v Hickman
- Provincial Judges Reference
- Re Therrien
- Provincial Court Judges' Assn of New Brunswick v New Brunswick (Minister of Justice)
