= R v Seaboyer =

- Supreme Court of Canada

Hearing: March 26, 27, 1991 Judgment: August 22, 1991
- Citations: [1991] 2 S.C.R. 577
- Docket No.: 20666

Court membership
- Chief Justice: Antonio Lamer; Puisne Justices: Gérard La Forest, Claire L'Heureux-Dubé, John Sopinka, Charles Gonthier, Peter Cory, Beverley McLachlin, William Stevenson, Frank Iacobucci

Reasons given
- Majority: McLachlin J., joined by Lamer C.J. and La Forest, Sopinka, Cory, Stevenson and Iacobucci JJ.
- Concur/dissent: L'Heureux‑Dubé J., joined by Gonthier J.

R v Seaboyer, [1991] 2 S.C.R. 577 is a leading Supreme Court of Canada decision where the Court upheld—with alterations—a rape-shield provision of the Criminal Code as it violated the right to "full answer and defence" under sections 7 and 11(d) of the Canadian Charter of Rights and Freedoms. The case was decided with R v Gayme.

Justice McLachlin, for the court majority, found that section 276 of the Criminal Code (formerly s. 246.6) was unjustifiably inconsistent with both s. 7 and s. 11 of the Charter, while s. 277 (formerly s. 246.7) was not inconsistent. Those charged with sexual assault offences from cross-examining the complainant about their history of sexual activity, could, in some instances, exclude evidence needed to mount a full defence.

Justice L'Heureux-Dubé, in partial dissent, would have found that neither section of the Criminal Code was inconsistent with the Charter, and if they had been inconsistent, that they would have been justifiably so.

== See also ==
- List of Supreme Court of Canada cases (Lamer Court)
- R v O'Connor
- R v Mills (1999)
