= Section 13 =

Section 13 may refer to:

- Section 13 of the Canadian Charter of Rights and Freedoms
- Section 13 of the Canadian Human Rights Act
- Section 13 of the Constitution of Australia
- A secret group in the 2000-2005 animated series Jackie Chan Adventures which combats magical and supernatural threats.
