= Peace, order, and good government =

Political-philosophical phrase in Commonwealth countries

In many Commonwealth jurisdictions, the phrase "peace, order, and good government" (POGG) is an expression used in law to express the legitimate objects of legislative powers conferred by statute. The phrase appears in many Imperial Acts of Parliament and Letters Patent, most notably the constitutions of Barbados, several of the British Overseas Territories, Canada, Australia and formerly New Zealand and South Africa.

== Background ==
Legal documents often contain a residual clause which expresses which entity will have authority over jurisdictions that have not otherwise been delineated or are in dispute. While specific authorities are often enumerated in legal documents as well, the designation of a residual power helps provide direction to future decision-makers and in emerging issue areas.

At its origin, the preferred phrase was "peace, welfare and good government," but this eventually evolved into "peace, order and good government," which soon became part of the standard phraseology used in British colonies to denote the residual power of the government. Although this phrase is used in the constitutional documents of several commonwealth countries, it has taken on a particular importance in the Canadian constitution due to repeated disputes about the nature of residual federal power in Canada.

It is often contrasted with "life, liberty and the pursuit of happiness", a spiritually analogous phrase found in the US Declaration of Independence. While in British colonial India's Constitution of 1935, the reference was used: "Peace or Tranquility".

== Canada ==
In Canada, "peace, order and good government" (in French, paix, ordre et bon gouvernement) is sometimes abbreviated as POGG and is often used to describe the principles upon which that country's Confederation took place.

A similar phrase, "peace, welfare, and good government", had been used the Act of Union 1840 that created the Province of Canada. The now familiar phrase "peace, order and good government" was originally used in the British North America Act 1867 (now known as the Constitution Act, 1867) enacted by the Imperial Parliament, and it defines the principles under which the Parliament of Canada should legislate. Specifically, the phrase appears in section 91 of the act, which is part of the block of sections that divide legislative powers between the federal and provincial levels of government.

It shall be lawful for the Queen, by and with the Advice and Consent of the Senate and House of Commons, to make Laws for the Peace, Order, and good Government of Canada, in relation to all Matters...

POGG is a head of power arising from opening words of section 91 and is distinct from the enumerated powers under that section. The broad language suggests to some although not to others that there is a comprehensive grant of residual legislative authority to the federal government. Although the residual nature of the clause remains, the scope of the clause has been limited by the jurisprudence of the Judicial Committee of the Privy Council (JCPC). The JCPC narrowed the scope of the clause to the three distinct branches which remain while also broadly interpreting the scope of provincial authority over property and civil rights under section 92(13) of the Constitution Act, 1867. The jurisprudence has been defined into three branches: Emergency Branch, Gap or Purely Residual Branch, and National Concern Branch, as defined in the Supreme Court of Canada judgment Re: Anti-Inflation Act.

=== Interpretation doctrines ===
Although the text of the act gives Parliament residuary powers to enact laws in any area that has not been allocated to the provincial governments, subsequent jurisprudence has limited the scope of the "peace, order, and good government" power. The limitation on the scope of this clause stems from the narrow interpretation of its branches and the expansive interpretation of provincial powers under section 92 of the Constitution Act, 1867. Particularly limiting is the breadth of provincial power over property and civil rights under s. 92(13). Although the Emergency Branch and the National Concern Branch may be viewed as delimited federal competencies like the enumerated clauses under section 91 (see e.g. AG Canada v AG Ontario (Labour Conventions), [1937] AC 326 (PC)), the clause remains residuary.

The powers under POGG must be interpreted in light of the subsequent jurisprudence on the limitations of the clause and the expansive powers of the provinces under their enumerated heads of power. If a matter does not fall within one of the enumerated classes in section 92, section 91, or the emergency or national concern branches, then it falls within the narrowly defined residual branch of POGG. The POGG power is best understood as a narrowly defined residual power limited to the following three branches.

==== The gap or purely residual branch ====
POGG's gap-filling power covers issues such as drafting oversights and matters not within the boundaries of a province. Drafting oversights include things the drafters of the constitution forgot to think about but would unambiguously have allocated to Parliament if they had. For instance, section 92 allocates responsibility for provincially incorporated companies to the legislatures but section 91 says nothing about federally incorporated companies: the gap branch allocates this jurisdiction to Parliament, per John Deere Plow Co v Wharton, 1915. Matters not within the boundaries of a particular province include Canadian territorial lands and waters that are within provincial boundaries such as the seabed off the coast of Newfoundland, per Reference Re Seabed and Subsoil of Continental Shelf Offshore Newfoundland, [1984] 1 S.C.R. 86.

The gap branch is rarely relied on because there is so little left to default to the federal government after taking into account the enumerated provincial power over property and civil rights under section 92(13) which applies to any transaction, person or activity that is found within the province. Historically new subject matters, such as aeronautics, do not necessarily fall residually to the federal government, per Johannesson v West St Paul (Rural Municipality of), 1952.

==== The emergency branch ====
Parliament may invoke emergency powers under the emergency branch of POGG. This began in 1882, when the Judicial Committee of the Privy Council (then the supreme authority over Canadian law) ruled in Russell v. The Queen that the federal government could legislate with regard to alcohol, because even though this would probably have been considered provincial jurisdiction in ordinary circumstances, the federal government was acting to ensure order in Canada. This concept further evolved during the 1920s, when in the 1922 Board of Commerce case, it was stated that POGG could be invoked in times of war and famine, to allow Parliament to intervene in matters of provincial jurisdiction. POGG was later used this way in the Anti-Inflation Reference of 1976, when the Supreme Court of Canada allowed Parliament to regulate inflation on the grounds that it posed a considerable economic problem for Canada. In that case, a great degree of deference was exercised in accepting what the federal government deemed to be an emergency.

==== The national concern branch ====
The "national concern" doctrine (sometimes referred to as "national dimensions") was an alternate means of applying the POGG powers that found use in the mid-20th century. It allowed Parliament to legislate on matters that would normally fall to the provincial government when the issue became of such importance that it concerned the entire country.

The doctrine originated from a statement by Lord Watson in the Local Prohibition case (1896), wherein he stated:

Their Lordships do not doubt that some matters, in their origin local and provincial, might attain such dimensions as to affect the body politic of the Dominion, and to justify the Canadian Parliament in passing laws for their regulation or abolition in the interest of the Dominion.

After this case the doctrine was completely ignored until 1946 when Viscount Simons brought it back in the case of Ontario v. Canada Temperance Foundation, [1946] A.C. 193 (P.C.). The test as stated in Temperance Foundation was whether the matter "goes beyond local or provincial concern or interests and must from its inherent nature be the concern of the Dominion as a whole".

==== Current approach towards interpretation ====
The above branches of the power are currently governed by the principles stated by Le Dain J. in R. v. Crown Zellerbach Canada Ltd.:

The national concern doctrine is separate and distinct from the national emergency doctrine of the peace, order and good government power, which is chiefly distinguishable by the fact that it provides a constitutional basis for what is necessarily legislation of a temporary nature;

The national concern doctrine applies to both new matters which did not exist at Confederation and to matters which, although originally matters of a local or private nature in a province, have since, in the absence of national emergency, become matters of national concern;

For a matter to qualify as a matter of national concern in either sense it must have a singleness, distinctiveness and indivisibility that clearly distinguishes it from matters of provincial concern and a scale of impact on provincial jurisdiction that is reconcilable with the fundamental distribution of legislative power under the Constitution;

In determining whether a matter has attained the required degree of singleness, distinctiveness and indivisibility that clearly distinguishes it from matters of provincial concern it is relevant to consider what would be the effect on extra‑provincial interests of a provincial failure to deal effectively with the control or regulation of the intra‑provincial aspects of the matter.

=== Sociological value ===
Despite its technical purpose, the phrase "peace, order and good government" has also become meaningful to Canadians. This tripartite motto is sometimes said to define Canadian values in a way comparable to “liberté, égalité, fraternité” (liberty, equality, fraternity) in France or “life, liberty and the pursuit of happiness” in the United States.

It has been used by some scholars to make broad characterizations of Canada's political culture. US sociologist Seymour Martin Lipset, for example, contrasted POGG with the American tripartite motto to conclude Canadians generally believe in a higher degree of deference to the law. As Canadian historian Donald Creighton argued in his report to the Royal Commission on Dominion-Provincial Relations, the expression was used interchangeably in the 19th century by Canadian and Imperial officials with the expression peace, welfare and good government. The term welfare referred not to its more narrow modern echoes, but to the protection of the common wealth, the general public good. Good government referred to good public administration, on the one hand, but also had echoes of what we now talk of as good governance, which incorporates the notion of appropriate self-governance by civil society actors, since one element of good government was thought to be its limitation to its appropriate sphere of responsibility.

== Elsewhere in the Commonwealth ==
The phrase "peace, order and good government" appears in many 19th and 20th century British Acts of Parliament, such as the New Zealand Constitution Act 1852, the Colonial Laws Validity Act 1865, the British Settlements Act 1887, the Commonwealth of Australia Constitution Act 1900, the South Africa Act 1909, Hong Kong Letters Patent 1917, and the West Indies Act 1962 and the Government of Ireland Act 1920. In the Constitution of Malta, the phrase is followed by the qualifier "in conformity with full respect for human rights, generally accepted principles of international law and Malta’s international and regional obligations in particular those assumed by the treaty of accession to the European Union".

The 1921 Anglo-Irish Treaty began "Ireland shall have ... a Parliament having powers to make laws for the peace, order and good government of Ireland, and an Executive responsible to that Parliament"; the resulting 1922 Constitution stated "The sole and exclusive power of making laws for the peace, order and good government of the Irish Free State (Saorstát Eireann) is vested in the Oireachtas." The words "sole and exclusive" were added by Charles Gavan Duffy in an attempt to deny the Westminster Parliament's right to legislate for the Free State, which Westminster overrode in the Irish Free State Constitution Act 1922. In 1932, Éamon de Valera justified abolishing the legislative oath of fidelity to the King, despite the oath being required by the 1921 treaty, on the basis that it was "a measure required for the peace, order and good government of the State". The current 1937 Constitution replaces the 1922 text with "The sole and exclusive power of making laws for the State is hereby vested in the Oireachtas", dropping mention of "peace, order and good government", although elsewhere it separately mentions "peace" and "order".

In Ibrelebbe v. The Queen [1964] AC 900, 923, the words "peace, order and good government" contained in the Ceylon Constitution Order-in-Council (1946) were said by the Privy Council to: "connote, in British constitutional language, the widest law-making powers appropriate to a sovereign". Likewise in Australia, the High Court found in Union Steamship v King [1988] HCA 55 that the grant of power to legislate 'for peace, order/welfare and good government' was a plenary power to legislate within/for the territory.

However, in New Zealand, those powers are not considered as unlimited. In The Trustees Executors and Agency Co. Ltd v. Federal Commissioner of Taxation (1933) 49 CLR 220, Justice Evatt of the High Court of Australia wrote a separate judgement analysing the power to make laws for the "peace, order and good government of New Zealand" under the New Zealand Constitution. Evatt held that laws dealing only with circumstances, persons or things outside of New Zealand, while not prima facie invalid could, in some cases, fail to satisfy the description of being for the peace, order and good government of New Zealand. A law that failed to satisfy that description would be beyond legislative power and invalid, but Evatt J noted that cases of this kind would be "very rare".

In Bancoult (No 1) in 2000, the High Court of England and Wales struck down an ordinance made in 1971 by the Commissioner of the British Indian Ocean Territory (BIOT) which had expelled the entire population of the Chagos Archipelago to make way for an American military base at Diego Garcia, purportedly under his power to legislate for the "peace, order and good government" of the territory. Lord Justice Richard Gibbs wrote: "Each of the words 'peace,' 'order' and 'good government' in relation to a territory necessarily carries with it the implication that citizens of the territory are there to take the benefits. Their detention, removal and exclusion from the territory are inconsistent with any or all of these words." This was overturned in 2008 when the Law Lords held in Bancoult (No 2) that the plenary power exists to the extent that even legislation removing all inhabitants from a territory is valid; Lord Hoffman wrote that "the words 'peace order and good government' have never been construed as words limiting the power of a legislature", and that "the prerogative power of the Crown to legislate for a ceded colony has never been limited by the requirement that the legislation should be for the peace, order and good government or otherwise for the benefit of the inhabitants of that colony" Lord Rodger said "what can properly be said to conduce to the peace, order and good government of BIOT" was not justiciable; Lord Carswell agreed, writing "A court might understandably be strongly attracted to the view that a law which removes the Chagossians from their homeland cannot be said to be for the peace, order and good government of the colony. But it is not for the courts to declare the law invalid on that ground." The 2008 decision was confirmed in the 2016 UK Supreme Court case R (on the application of Bancoult (No 2)) v Secretary of State for Foreign and Commonwealth Affairs.

== See also ==
- Canadian federalism
- Implied Bill of Rights
- Johannesson v. West St. Paul (first case analyzing the term decided by the Supreme Court of Canada)
- Police power (United States constitutional law)
- Breach of the peace

== General and cited references ==
- Creighton, D. G. British North America at Confederation: A Study Prepared for the Royal Commission on Dominion-Provincial Relations. Ottawa, Queen's Printer, 1939.
- Dyck, Rand. Canadian Politics: Critical Approaches. Third ed. Scarborough, Ontario: Nelson Thomson Learning, 2000.
- That Section 4(1) of the Government of Ireland Act 1920 as Enacted stated "Subject to the provisions of this Act, the Parliament of Southern Ireland and the Parliament of Northern Ireland shall respectively have power to make laws for the peace, order, and good government of Southern Ireland and Northern Ireland with the following limitations, namely, that they shall not have power to make laws except in respect of matters exclusively relating to the portion of Ireland within their jurisdiction, or some part thereof, and (without prejudice to that general limitation) that they shall not have power to make laws in respect of the following matters in particular, namely:—"
