= Reference Re Anti-Inflation Act =

- Supreme Court of Canada

Hearing: May 31, June 1–4, 1976 Judgment: July 12, 1976
- Citations: 68 DLR (3d) 452, 9 NR 541, [1976] SCJ No 12 (QL)
- Prior history: Reference question by the Governor in Council
- Ruling: Answered "no" to both questions

Court membership
- Chief Justice: Bora Laskin; Puisne Justices: Ronald Martland, Wilfred Judson, Roland Ritchie, Wishart Spence, Louis-Philippe Pigeon, Brian Dickson, Jean Beetz, Louis-Philippe de Grandpré

Reasons given
- Majority: Laskin C.J., joined by Judson, Spence and Dickson JJ.
- Concurrence: Ritchie J., joined by Martland and Pigeon JJ.
- Dissent: Beetz J., joined by de Grandpré J.

Reference Re Anti-Inflation Act, [1976] 2 S.C.R. 373 was a landmark reference question opinion of the Supreme Court of Canada on the constitutionality of the Anti-Inflation Act. In what has become among the most significant federalism cases of the Supreme Court, the Act was held to be within the power of the federal government.

The Anti-Inflation Act was passed in 1975, on recommendation of the Bank of Canada, to control the growing inflation of the past several years. Due to growing unease with the Act, the federal government put two questions to the Supreme Court on the validity of the Act. The major question being whether the Act was ultra vires of the federal government.

First, the Court noted that the subject-matter of the Act being inflation made it impossible to assign to one of the enumerated powers in the Constitution Act, 1867. Consequently, the Act would be able to be upheld only under the peace, order and good government (POGG) power under the Constitution which allowed the federal government to legislate in matters related to emergencies or matters of national concern. The Court looked at both options and found that the law could be saved under the emergency power of the peace, order and good government power.

== Aftermath ==
In 1997, the Supreme Court found in the Provincial Judges Reference that independent commissions should recommend the salaries of judges. If governments reject the recommendations, the Supreme Court said courts should analyze these rejections in the same way it analyzed the Anti-Inflation Act in this case.

In Provincial Court Judges' Assn. of New Brunswick v. New Brunswick (Minister of Justice) (2005), the Supreme Court clarified that it did not that mean an economic emergency was needed to justify not following the recommendations. It merely referred to a reviewing method to determine whether the rejection was rational.
