= Re Therrien =

- Supreme Court of Canada

Hearing: 2 October 2000 Judgment: 7 June 2001
- Full case name: Judge Richard Therrien, QCJ v The Minister of Justice and The Attorney General of Quebec
- Citations: 2001 SCC 35
- Docket No.: 27004
- Prior history: APPEAL from Re Therrien, 1998 CanLII 12509 (28 October 1998)
- Ruling: Appeal dismissed

Court membership
- Chief Justice: Beverley McLachlin; Puisne Justices: Claire L'Heureux-Dubé, Charles Gonthier, Frank Iacobucci, John C. Major, Michel Bastarache, Ian Binnie, Louise Arbour, Louis LeBel

Reasons given
- Unanimous reasons by: Gonthier J
- Major and LeBel JJ took no part in the consideration or decision of the case.

Re Therrien, [2001] 2 S.C.R. 3, 2001 SCC 35, is a leading decision of the Supreme Court of Canada on judicial independence.

== Background ==
In the 1970s, Richard Therrien was convicted of assisting four members of the Front de libération du Québec during the October Crisis. Once he was released he studied law and was eventually given a pardon. Years later he applied for a position on the Quebec bench as a judge. As part of his application he disclosed his criminal record and his pardon. He was rejected based on this history. Later he applied again, this time he did not reveal his criminal history and was accepted. Once the committee discovered the existence of a criminal history they got the Minister of Justice to issue a complaint to the Quebec Conseil de la magistrature. The Conseil found the complaint to be justified and recommended that he be removed from the bench.

Therrien applied to have the decision of the Conseil to be judicially reviewed and challenged the constitutionality of the removal process under the Courts of Justice Act. The Minister of Justice applied to have Therrien's applications dismissed. The Quebec Court of Appeal dismissed Therrien's application for review.

== Opinion of the Court ==
Justice Gonthier, writing for a unanimous Court, dismissed Therrien's appeal.

Gonthier dismissed the first argument by Therrien that the Court of Appeal and Supreme Court did not have jurisdiction over the matter. Section 95 of the Courts of Justice Act clearly granted the right to the courts to review the decisions of the inquiry panel.

Gonthier considered whether section 95 of the Courts of Justice Act, which established the requirements to remove a judge, violated the constitutional principle of judicial independence guaranteed under the preamble of the Constitution Act, 1867. He found that judicial independence did not extend so far, as to require that any removal of a judge must involve an address to the legislature and so section 95 was constitutional.

== See also ==
- List of Supreme Court of Canada cases (McLachlin Court)
- Valente v R
- Beauregard v Canada
- Mackeigan v Hickman
- R v Généreux
- Provincial Judges Reference
- Provincial Court Judges' Assn of New Brunswick v New Brunswick (Minister of Justice)
