= Reference re Remuneration of Judges of the Provincial Court =

- Supreme Court of Canada

Hearing: December 3–4, 1996 Judgment: September 18, 1997
- Full case name: Reference re Remuneration of Judges of the Provincial Court of Prince Edward Island; Reference re Independence and Impartiality of Judges of the Provincial Court of Prince Edward Island
- Citations: [1997] 3 S.C.R. 3; 1997 CanLII 317 (S.C.C.);(1997), [1998] 156 Nfld. & P.E.I.R. 1; (1997), 150 D.L.R. (4th) 577; [1997] 10 W.W.R. 417.
- Ruling: The independence and impartiality of the judiciary is protected under the Charter of Rights and Freedoms

Court membership
- Chief Justice: Chief Justice Antonio Lamer
- Puisne Justices: Claire L'Heureux-Dubé, Charles Gonthier, Peter Cory, Frank Iacobucci, John Sopinka, Gérard La Forest

Reasons given
- Majority: Chief Justice Antonio Lamer, joined by Claire L'Heureux-Dubé, Charles Gonthier, Peter Cory, Frank Iacobucci, John Sopinka
- Dissent: Gérard La Forest

The Reference re Remuneration of Judges of the Provincial Court (P.E.I.) [1997] 3 S.C.R. 3 is a leading opinion of the Supreme Court of Canada in response to a reference question regarding remuneration and the independence and impartiality of provincial court judges. Notably, the majority opinion found all judges are independent, not just superior court judges and inferior court judges concerned with criminal law, as the written constitution stipulates. Unwritten constitutional principles were relied upon to demonstrate this, indicating such principles were growing in importance in constitutional interpretation. The reference also remains one of the most definitive statements on the extent to which all judges in Canada are protected by the Constitution.

The majority opinion established that independent compensation commissions are required to help set salaries free of political manipulation. These commissions, described by the majority as "an institutional sieve" and by the dissent as "a virtual fourth branch of government", make recommendations that governments may deviate from only with rational explanations. However, the reference has been subject to harsh published criticisms.

== Background ==
The reference was the amalgamation of three different sets of challenges to the impartiality and independence of provincial court judges in Manitoba, Prince Edward Island, and Alberta. The powers of the provincial legislatures to reduce the salaries of the provincial court judges was challenged as a violation of section 11(d) of the Canadian Charter of Rights and Freedoms, which gives an accused the right to be presumed innocent until proven guilty "in a fair and public hearing by an independent and impartial tribunal".

In Prince Edward Island and Manitoba, the salaries of judges were lowered along with those of other civil servants to help combat deficits. In Prince Edward Island, various challenges of the judges' consequent independence were raised by defendants, causing the government to bring two reference questions to its Supreme Court. Only one reference resulted in a finding of dependence, namely for lack of adequate security of tenure. In Manitoba, the pay cut was challenged directly by a provincial judges association. Meanwhile, in Alberta, cuts to judicial salaries were challenged by defendants. Concerns in Alberta were also raised by Alberta Premier Ralph Klein saying on the radio that a certain judge should be "very, very quickly fired". The judge had threatened to simply stop working due to his belief that his salary was insufficient. (The Supreme Court only briefly addressed this, saying Klein's words were "unfortunate and reflect a misunderstanding of the theory and practice of judicial independence in Canada".)

== Opinion of the Court ==
Lamer C.J. with L'Heureux-Dubé, Sopinka, Gonthier, Cory and Iacobucci JJ, allowed the appeals in part, stating that there was constitutional protection of judicial independence and impartiality for all judges.

One problem identified was that the independence of provincial judges was not protected as extensively as the federal judges were under sections 96 to 100 of the Constitution Act, 1867. The majority read section 11(d) as only protecting independence in the exercise of jurisdiction in relation to offence (i.e., it would protect judges concerned with criminal law, but not civil law). However, section 11(d) is not a broad or exhaustive code. Instead, the Court looked to constitutional norms and found that judicial independence was one such norm implied by the preamble to the Constitution. Although Lamer recognized case law such as the Patriation Reference which noted the preamble technically has no binding effect in itself, he also found the preamble reveals the "basic principles which are the very source of the substantive provisions of the Constitution Act, 1867" and "invites the use of those organizing principles to fill out gaps in the express terms of the constitutional scheme". The implication of the importance of judicial independence came from the preamble's statement that Canada's constitution should be similar to the United Kingdom's, and the UK has a tradition of judicial independence. The Act of Settlement of 1701 was particularly important for independence. The Supreme Court had previously reached this conclusion in Beauregard v. Canada (1986). However, the Court now claimed that since courts are more important today, judicial independence has become a fundamental issue that should not just be reserved for the superior courts, as dictated by the Act of Settlement. The Constitution could adapt to changing circumstances in this regard. (This interpretation of the British Constitution has inspired criticism. The British form of judicial independence was more limited in 1867, neither extending to inferior courts nor limiting government power to lower the judges' remuneration. At any rate, no act of Parliament can be declared ultra vires by a court in British law. This is why academic Jeffrey Goldsworthy attacked the decision as "a self-contradiction, a vague reference to 'evolution' combined with a plainly false analogy, and an evasion".)

The Court turned back to examine section 11(d) and from precedent, namely Valente v. The Queen, identified three fundamental requirements of judicial independence: 1) security of tenure, 2) financial security, and 3) some administrative independence. As well, judicial independence can be divided into two types of independence: 1) individual independence belonging to a judge and 2) institutional independence of a court as a whole. A judge must also be reasonably seen as being independent. It is possible, Lamer found, to interpret each of the three requirements in light of the two types of independence; this case, in particular, would explore how financial security belongs to both a judge and the court as a whole. This discussion would go beyond Valente, since that decision only treated financial security as a matter of individual independence.

The Court emphasized that the role of institutional independence has become expected of provincial courts due to their increased role in dispute resolution in the country. As a previous judicial independence case, Beauregard, had demonstrated, institutional independence was needed so that courts could guard the Constitution, the rule of law and fundamental justice. This required more separation of powers; whereas judicial independence has normally been understood to protect the judiciary from the executive, the Court now found the judiciary should be free of manipulation from the legislative branch. Provincial courts should benefit from this independence, as demonstrated by their handling of important cases such as R. v. Big M Drug Mart Ltd. in 1983.

For these reasons, it was strongly suggested that the government establish judicial salary commissions, thus overruling obiter dicta in the previous landmark judicial independence case, Valente v. The Queen, which had found such commissions were desirable but not necessary. In this case, it was noted commissions could guard against manipulation by both the executive and legislatures. If remuneration of provincial judges is to be raised, lowered or kept the same, this may be done along with the remuneration of other government employees or with the judges' alone. The continued independence of judges, however, will be kept apparent in any of these circumstances if it involves review by an "independent, effective, and objective" body, i.e. the salary commissions. While salary recommendations of these commissions should not be binding, they should be taken seriously. Any government rejection of a recommendation will have to be justified and may be challenged in a court. However, the justification need not be scrutinized to the extent that a government decision will be scrutinized under Section One of the Canadian Charter of Rights and Freedoms. Instead, governments must only show their rejections are rational, and rationality can be measured in the way it was measured by the Supreme Court in Reference re Anti-Inflation Act (1976).

Another benefit for having salary commissions was that it eliminated direct salary negotiations between the government and judges. Such direct negotiations would naturally raise concerns about what exactly is being negotiated. Namely, there was a concern that governments could manipulate judges to make decisions in certain ways. In order to ensure the government would not deliberately let judges' salaries fall below the cost of living, in relation to inflation, it was also decided that the commissions should meet regularly, for example once every three to five years.

Since judicial independence is guaranteed by the preamble, civil law judges have a right to these salary commissions, even though they have no rights under section 11(d).

Turning to the facts of the case, the Supreme Court faulted the governments of Prince Edward Island and Alberta for neither consulting salary commissions nor having such bodies to begin with. For this reason, the actions of these governments breached section 11(d) of the Charter of Rights. Manitoba did have a salary commission, but its actions were unconstitutional because the provincial government did not use it. Since these considerations were made using section 11(d), the Court considered whether violations of these rights could be justified under section 1 of the Charter of Rights, as is normal procedure. Section 1 typically requires a valid government reason for violating rights, and in this case Prince Edward Island and Alberta's actions failed the section 1 test because they did not explain why they did not have salary commissions. Likewise, Manitoba did not explain why they did not use their salary commission. An academic commentator has suggested the section 1 analysis was actually unneeded since the right to a commission is based in the preamble, which is not subject to section 1; the analysis was thus "a first year law school mistake".

== Dissent ==
La Forest J., alone in dissent, rejected the majority's finding of an unwritten constitutional principle that protects a right to judicial salary commissions. He was very wary of the "discovery" of such new principles, especially when some protection of judges can already be found elsewhere in the text of the Constitution, namely section 11(d), which was the subject of this case. The counsel had primarily relied on section 11(d) and only briefly spoke of unwritten rules. La Forest also suggested that section 11(d) granting independence only to inferior criminal law judges, and not inferior civil law judges, was deliberate, because "Being accused of a crime is one of the most momentous encounters an individual can have with the power of the state."

La Forest went on to caution that "judicial power" is limited so that a court "does not initiate matters and has no agenda of its own". This made him worried about the majority launching into an extensive, unneeded discussion on unwritten principles. He accepted unwritten principles exist, but disputed that limits on government decisions can be found in the preamble. There was no tradition guarding judicial independence against Parliament. Parliamentary supremacy remained important in Britain even after the Act of Settlement; thus British courts cannot invalidate a law, even if the law is generally thought to be wrong. La Forest acknowledged this could be seen as a "technical quibble" since courts in Canada can invalidate laws, but he went on to point out that the Act of Settlement only covered superior judges, and not inferior judges. He also said courts should have clearer grounds for limiting legislative actions, casting previous decisions such as Switzman v. Elbling (1957), which relied on the Implied Bill of Rights, into doubt. He pointed to Attorney General for Canada and Dupond v. Montreal (1978) as a prior Supreme Court decision questioning the Implied Bill of Rights. If an implied bill of rights existed, it should be found in the creation of Parliament, in section 17 of the Constitution Act, 1867, and should allow for Parliamentary supremacy instead of limiting it.

In this case, La Forest pointed to Valente and R. v. Lippé to show section 11(d) does not guarantee a type of independence that is most favourable to judges. The conclusion in Valente that judicial compensation committees were not needed was therefore valid; section 11(d) left room for determining what methods can be used to achieve independence. In this case, judges' salaries were lowered along with those of other government employees, and this did not seem to raise reasonable concerns about judicial independence. As a judicial compensation commission likely should not have a problem with this, as acknowledged by Lamer, La Forest found the requirement that the commission look into the matter to be "a triumph of form over substance".

La Forest also felt requiring such commissions was also "tantamount to enacting a new constitutional provision to extend the protection provided by s. 11(d)" by forcing the creation of "what in some respects is a virtual fourth branch of government to police the interaction between the political branches and the judiciary". Judges simply asking whether government decisions seem reasonable would be enough.

== Rehearing ==
The 1997 Reference caused numerous challenges regarding the creation of compensation committees. Some governments needed more time to establish and consult them. Moreover, by finding provincial courts were not independent because salary commissions were not used, the Reference seemed to imply criminal law decisions by provincial courts were invalid under section 11(d), since defendants were not tried before independent tribunals. Consequently, the governments of Alberta, Manitoba and Prince Edward Island turned to the Court again. In Re Remuneration of Judges (No. 2) (1998), Lamer for a unanimous court decided that necessity dictated that dependent provincial courts be deemed acceptable for the time being. Also as a result of the second decision, the requirement for commissions did not become binding until September 18, 1998.

== Aftermath ==
Scholars have offered various specific critiques for the majority opinion. Among these was that it was self-contradictory. The request that government reasons should be rational and legitimate seemed to ask for two separate things, namely reasonableness and correctness. Rationality allows for government reasons to be accepted if they are not overly flawed, even if courts disagree with them. Legitimacy, meanwhile, implies government decisions should be correct, i.e., consistent with commission recommendations. Professor Peter Hogg objected to the notion that governments and judges cannot directly negotiate. He wrote that "It assumes that there is a real possibility that judges would violate their oath of office and decide cases wrongly (for example, by convicting an innocent person or imposing an unduly harsh penalty) in order to obtain some (highly speculative and likely trivial) advantage at the negotiating table."

Hogg also felt the Reference made it increasingly unlikely that judges' salaries can be lowered. In terms of case law, he pointed to Mackin v. New Brunswick (2002) as a case that, after the 1997 Reference, "reinforced and even extended" the notion that lowering judges' salaries could be unconstitutional.

After the Reference, all provinces had salary commissions. The Reference also inspired the federal government under Prime Minister Jean Chrétien to establish a salary commission for federal judges, the Judicial Compensation and Benefits Commission. Still, the Provincial Judges Reference sparked further litigation as some provincial government's decisions not to follow commissions' salary recommendations were challenged in the courts. The Supreme Court addressed the matter again in 2005 in Provincial Court Judges' Assn. of New Brunswick v. New Brunswick (Minister of Justice) and urged courts to be deferential when governments give sufficient reasons for rejecting salary commissions' recommendations.

Some scholars also expressed concern that the reference set a precedent for enforcing unwritten rules. This could lead to even wider grounds for judicial review. The study of unwritten rules is also said to have surfaced in the Supreme Court decisions New Brunswick Broadcasting Co. v. Nova Scotia (Speaker of the House of Assembly) (1993) and Reference re Secession of Quebec (1998), and one scholar called it a "very old and venerable" feature of common law. Conversely, one critic, who claimed the 1997 Reference represented the first time that the unwritten constitution was used to invalidate a statute in Canada, said that courts had consequently grown "bolder in their law-creating enterprise" and that "If law requires certainty, unwritten principles are bound to create problems."

== See also ==
- List of Supreme Court of Canada cases (Lamer Court)
- Mackeigan v. Hickman
- R. v. Généreux
- Therrien (Re)
