= Judicial Compensation and Benefits Commission =

The Judicial Compensation and Benefits Commission is a Canadian commission that recommends judicial salaries for federally appointed judges.

The commission was created in 1999 by the government of Prime Minister Jean Chrétien, under the Judges Act. This was prompted by the Provincial Judges Reference (1997), an opinion by the Supreme Court of Canada, although the federal government itself was not bound by this opinion. The Reference had stated that independent commissions are needed to ensure salaries are free of political manipulation. This was based in the principle of judicial independence, said to be implied by the preamble of the Constitution Act, 1867. The government accepted the Reference's suggestion that such commissions are necessary and must be "Independent, objective and effective."

Members have tenure for four years and make a report with recommendations every four years. This report is given to the Minister of Justice. The first commissioners were Richard Drouin, Eleanore Cronk and Fred Gorbet. Later commissionerts included Gretta Chambers.

The government receives recommendations and may give reasons accepting them or rejecting parts. The government pointed to the Supreme Court's 2005 decision Provincial Court Judges' Assn. of New Brunswick v. New Brunswick (Minister of Justice) to show recommendations do not need to be followed entirely.
