= R v Pan; R v Sawyer =

- Supreme Court of Canada

Hearing: December 8, 2000 Judgment: June 29, 2001
- Full case name: Rui Wen Pan v Her Majesty The Queen; Bradley Sawyer v Her Majesty The Queen
- Citations: [2001] 2 S.C.R. 344, 2001 SCC 42, 2001 SCC 42, 200 D.L.R. (4th) 577, 155 C.C.C. (3d) 97, 43 C.R. (5th) 203, 85 C.R.R. (2d) 1, 147 O.A.C. 1

Court membership
- Chief Justice: Beverley McLachlin; Puisne Justices: Claire L'Heureux-Dubé, Charles Gonthier, Frank Iacobucci, John C. Major, Michel Bastarache, Ian Binnie, Louise Arbour, Louis LeBel

Reasons given
- Unanimous reasons by: Arbour J.

R v Pan; R v Sawyer [2001] 2 S.C.R. 344, 2001 SCC 42 is a Supreme Court of Canada decision on the criminal jury trial system. The Court held that rules against admitting evidence indicating the decision-making process of a jury were constitutional.

== Background ==
The case was based on the facts of two separate trials.

=== Pan case ===
Rui Pan was arrested and charged with murdering his girlfriend. In the first trial the jury was unable to come to a decision and so it was held to be a mistrial. In the second trial the judge discovered that one of the jury members had followed the first trial in the media and had consulted a doctor about the evidence. He had shared this information with the other members of the jury.

Pan brought an application for a stay of the proceedings based on the information about the jury and challenged the constitutionality of section 649 of the Criminal Code which prohibited the use of evidence regarding the deliberation of the jury. The trial judge denied the application.

=== Sawyer case ===
Bradley Sawyer and a co-accused were convicted of assault. Prior to the sentencing one of the jury members contacted Sawyer and told him that he had been put under undue pressure by certain members of the jury to convict him and that racist comments were made. Sawyer brought this up at sentencing and requested that the jury be investigated. The request was refused as it violated the common law rule of jury secrecy.

The Court of Appeal for Ontario heard appeals from both cases together. The court refused both appeals.

The following issues were before the Supreme Court of Canada"

1. whether s. 649 of the Criminal Code, which prohibited evidence related to jury deliberation, infringed sections 7, 11(d), or 11(f) of the Charter, and if so, whether it can be justified under section 1 of the Charter.
2. whether the common law rule prohibiting evidence related to jury deliberation infringed sections 7, 11(d), or 11(f) of the Charter, and if so whether it is justified under section 1.
3. whether s. 653(1) of the Criminal Code and/or the common law power of a judge to declare a mistrial, during or following the deliberations of the jury, violate the protection against double jeopardy guaranteed by section 7 of the Charter, and if so whether it is justified under section 1.
4. whether s. 653(1) of the Criminal Code violates sections 7, 11(d) or 11(f) of the Canadian Charter of Rights and Freedoms, and if so, whether it is justifiable under section 1.

Justice Arbour, writing for the unanimous Court, held that there was no violation of the Charter on any of the issues.

== Opinion of the Court ==
Arbour considered the origins of the common law jury secrecy rule. It prohibits the court from receiving any evidence on how the jury came to their decision. However, this does not include extrinsic evidence to the deliberation process. So evidence of outside forces attempting to influence the jury is admissible, but testimony from the jury of whether they were influenced is not admissible.

Arbour found that the secrecy rule and section 649 of the Code did not violate section 7. The rules are to help "ensure that jurors feel comfortable freely expressing their views in the jury room and that jurors who hold minority viewpoints do not feel pressured to retreat from their opinions because of possible negative repercussions associated with the disclosure of their positions." Evidence of jury tampering would have a greater effect to undermine an acquittal than a conviction. The erosion of the secrecy of the jury would have a negative impact on the ability of a jury to decide and would affect individual's right to jury trial under section 11(f) of the Charter. It is required under the principles of fundamental justice to have an impartial jury.

Arbour then examines the rules within the context of the Criminal Code and found that other provisions of the Code complement the functioning of the rules to ensure that juries are free of biases.

In conclusion, she found that the Code provision and the common law rule were valid and did not violate the Charter, but that a comprehensive study of the jury trial process could be revealing on whether there is any need for a change.

== See also ==
- List of Supreme Court of Canada cases (McLachlin Court)
