= R v Zora =

Canadian legal decision

- Supreme Court of Canada

Hearing: December 4, 2019 Judgment: June 18, 2020
- Full case name: Her Majesty the Queen v Chaycen Michael Zora
- Citations: 2020 SCC 14
- Docket No.: 38540
- Prior history: Judgment for the Crown in the British Columbia Court of Appeal
- Ruling: Appeal allowed

Holding
- Section 145(3) of the Criminal Code requires subjective mens rea

Court membership
- Chief Justice: Richard Wagner; Puisne Justices: Rosalie Abella, Michael Moldaver, Andromache Karakatsanis, Suzanne Côté, Russell Brown, Malcolm Rowe, Sheilah Martin, Nicholas Kasirer

Reasons given
- Unanimous reasons by: Martin J

Laws applied
- Criminal Code s 145(3) [now ss 145(4) and 145(5)]

R v Zora, 2020 SCC 14 is a case in which the Supreme Court of Canada held unanimously that the offence of breaching bail conditions under the Criminal Code requires subjective mens rea.

== Background, facts, and procedural history ==
The Criminal Code defines a number of offences known as administration of justice offences. Such offences concern an accused's behaviour while he or she is involved in the criminal justice system, as opposed to conduct that results in criminal charges in the first instance. The case of R v Zora concerns the administration of justice offence of breaching bail conditions: failing to comply with rules stipulated by the court as a condition precedent to govern an accused's conduct while the accused is out on bail pending trial.

Chaycen Zora had been charged with drug possession under the Controlled Drugs and Substances Act and was released on bail with several conditions. One of these conditions was that he would answer the door when the police came to check on him. Due to his failure to comply with this condition, Zora was charged with an offence under section 145(3) of the Criminal Code.

Zora was convicted at trial and his appeal to the British Columbia Court of Appeal was dismissed. The Court of Appeal held that the statute required an objective, not a subjective, standard of mens rea, and that Zora failed to meet the standard. In essence, the statute required the Crown to prove that Zora's failure to comply with his bail condition represented a "marked departure from what a reasonable person in the same situation would do," not that Zora either intended to breach his bail condition, knew that he was breaching it, or was reckless as to whether he breached it or not.

Before the Supreme Court's decision in Zora, Canadian law was not consistent as to whether breach of bail conditions required subjective or objective mens rea. Courts in some provinces adopted one standard, while those in other provinces came to the opposite conclusion. Because criminal law in Canada is defined by federal statute but interpreted and enforced by provincial courts and administrators, breach of bail conditions had become a different offence in different provinces.

== Reasons of the Court ==
Justice Sheilah Martin, writing for a unanimous court, held that the Court of Appeal erred in finding that the statute only required proof of objective mens rea. Rather, s 145(3) requires a subjective standard. She held, following the Court's jurisprudence in R v Sault Ste-Marie (City of) and subsequent cases including R v ADH, 2013 SCC 28, that s 145(3) should be presumed to involve a subjective standard of fault and that the presumption was not displaced. Justice Martin acknowledged that the Criminal Code had been amended after Zora's trial, creating two new offences—at sections 145(4) and 145(5), respectively—to cover the offence for which Zora had originally been convicted, but noted that the substance of the offence of failing to comply with bail conditions had not been significantly changed. Thus, although Zora nominally concerns the interpretation of a now-defunct statute, its holding likely applies to 145(4) and 145(5).

The Court also emphasized that bail conditions must be "clearly articulated, minimal in number, necessary, reasonable, least onerous in the circumstances, and sufficiently linked to the accused’s risks regarding the statutory grounds for detention in s. 515(10)". They must respect the Canadian Charter of Rights and Freedoms and federal and provincial legislation; they must be reasonably capable of being obeyed by the accused; and they must be "tailored to the individual risks posed by the accused," not "a list of conditions inserted by rote."; This was meant to address common practices of imposing numerous bail conditions essentially automatically, often setting up accused to fail (e.g. in the case of addiction or other psychosocial problems), and resulting in multiple convictions for bail related to charges that might well themselves not lead to any conviction.

The Court identified several problems that frequently arise with routinely imposed bail conditions:

- Some conditions could be breached by behaviour that is actually a symptom of a mental illness, such as addiction, or could if obeyed put the accused at risk (e.g. of dangerous withdrawal symptoms).
- Some conditions related to social factors such as "attend school" or "attend counselling" may not be legitimate unless they address a specific risk presented by the accused.
- The commonplace condition "keep the peace and be of good behaviour" could transform the breach of any federal, provincial, or municipal statute, no matter how minor, into a criminal offence. This will usually be too onerous and disconnected from the actual risks posed by the accused.
- Conditions requiring the accused to follow the rules of their household, a shelter, etc., are too vague and do not give adequate notice of what conduct will be criminal, e.g. because the rules of the household could change at the whim of the person making them.
- Some conditions could have perverse unintended consequences on the safety of the accused or the public; e.g. they could prevent a vulnerable accused from calling for emergency services at a time when they are in breach of a condition.
- Bail conditions can curtail an accused's Charter rights, such as the right to freedom of expression or association or freedom from unreasonable search and seizure, at a time when the accused is still presumed innocent.

In the result, Justice Martin ordered a new trial.

== Commentary ==
Criminal defence lawyers spoke in favour of the decision, noting that it addressed broader issues in the Canadian bail system beyond the standard of fault in administration of justice offences.
