= R v Darrach =

- Supreme Court of Canada

Hearing: February 23, 2000 Judgment: October 12, 2000
- Full case name: Andrew Scott Darrach v Her Majesty The Queen
- Citations: [2000] 2 SCR 443, 2000 SCC 46
- Docket No.: 26564

Court membership
- Chief Justice: Beverley McLachlin; Puisne Justices: Claire L'Heureux-Dubé, Charles Gonthier, Frank Iacobucci, John C. Major, Michel Bastarache, Ian Binnie, Louise Arbour, Louis LeBel

Reasons given
- Unanimous reasons by: Gonthier J

R v Darrach, [2000] 2 SCR 443, 2000 SCC 46, is a case decided by the Supreme Court of Canada on the constitutionality of the Criminal Code's "rape shield law". The Court upheld the law.

== Background ==
In 1994, Andrew Darrach, an Ottawa resident, was charged with sexually assaulting his ex-girlfriend. At trial, he attempted to introduce evidence of his ex-girlfriend's sexual history. A voir dire, required under the rape shield law in section 276 of the Criminal Code to consider whether the evidence is admissible, was carried out. The judge refused to admit the evidence after Darrach refused to be cross-examined on his affidavit. Darrach was sentenced to nine months in jail. An initial appeal was dismissed by the Court of Appeal for Ontario. The case was then appealed to the Supreme Court.

Darrach argued he was denied a fair trial because he was unable to present evidence that he mistakenly believed that the ex-girlfriend had consented. He also argued that his right to silence and right against self-incrimination were violated by the requirement to testify at the voir dire.

== Judgment of the court ==
Gonthier J, writing for a unanimous Court, upheld the Criminal Code provisions. He found that requiring the complainant to testify on the voir dire about her sexual history, and before the admissibility of that evidence had been established, would be unnecessarily invasive and would discourage victims from reporting such incidents.

Gonthier also found that Darrach's right to avoid self-incrimination was not infringed by the requirement for him to testify regarding his voir dire affidavit, because the accused made the voluntary decision to have the voir dire carried out. The decision to have the voir dire, and by extension the requirement to submit an affidavit and accept cross-examination, was voluntarily made by Darrach. Any testimony at the voir dire would have solely been to determine the admissibility of the evidence Darrach wished to submit, and would have been unusable in the trial itself.

== See also ==
- List of Supreme Court of Canada cases (McLachlin Court)
