= Rape shield law =

Restrictions on evidence in sexual assault cases

A rape shield law is a law that limits the ability to introduce evidence about the past sexual activity of a complainant in a sexual assault trial, or that limits cross-examination of complainants about their past sexual behaviour in sexual assault cases. The term also refers to a law that prohibits the publication of the identity of a complainant in a sexual assault case.

Canadian judge Claire L'Heureux-Dubé wrote that the purpose of these laws went beyond "shield[ing] a complainant from the rigours of cross-examination at trial", and characterized the term rape shield as an "inaccurate shorthand".

== Australia ==
In Australia, all states and mainland territories have rape shield laws that limit the admission of evidence in criminal proceedings where someone is charged with a sexual offence. The principal aims of these laws are to:

- prohibit the admission of evidence of a complainant's sexual reputation;
- prevent the use of sexual history evidence to establish the complainant as a ‘type’ of person who is more likely to consent to sexual activity; and
- exclude the use of a complainant's sexual history as an indicator of the complainant's truthfulness.

== Canada ==
In Canadian criminal proceedings in respect of a sexual assault, section 276(1) of the Criminal Code restricts the admissibility of evidence that the complainant has engaged in sexual activity, whether with the accused or with any other person. Such evidence "is not admissible to support an inference that, by reason of the sexual nature of that activity, the complainant (a) is more likely to have consented to the sexual activity that forms the subject-matter of the charge; or (b) is less worthy of belief." The law sets down (in sections 276(2) and 276(3)) strict rules and procedures for determining admissibility of such evidence.

In 1991, the Supreme Court of Canada issued a decision in R. v. Seaboyer which held that the prior rape shield law (enacted in 1982) was unconstitutional, because the restrictions placed on an accused's ability to lead evidence were too strict. In 1992, Parliament amended the Criminal Code to re-establish the rape shield provision with strict guidelines for when and how previous sexual conduct could be used by a defendant at trial. The new legislation amended the Criminal Code provisions that govern the admissibility of evidence of sexual activity, refined the definition of consent to a sexual act, and restricted the defence that an accused had an honest but mistaken belief that the accuser had consented. The 1995 Supreme Court of Canada judgment in the case of British Columbia Bishop Hubert O'Connor (R. v. O'Connor) led to further amendments, which limited the production of a complainant's personal counselling records to the defence in sexual offence cases. Those provisions were tested in R. v. Mills, and upheld by the Supreme Court in 1999.

In the 2000 decision of R. v. Darrach, the Supreme Court of Canada upheld the law in a case involving the former Ottawa resident Andrew Scott Darrach, who was convicted of sexually assaulting his ex-girlfriend. Darrach was sentenced in 1994 to nine months in jail for the assault. By a 9–0 decision, the court found that of the rape shield provisions in the Criminal Code to be constitutional. The ruling said forcing the complainant to testify in a voir dire about her sexual history, before the admissibility of that evidence at the trial proper had been established, would invade her privacy and would "discourage the reporting of crimes of sexual violence." In his appeal, Darrach had argued that he had been denied a fair trial because he was unable to raise the fact that he mistakenly thought the incident was consensual. Darrach had argued also that the law unfairly required him to testify at his own trial because the trial judge had held an evidentiary hearing with the jury absent to determine whether an affidavit from Darrach describing his former relationship with the complainant was admissible. Since Darrach had refused to testify or be cross-examined on the affidavit, the trial judge had ruled that evidence inadmissible. The appeal upheld the trial judge's decision.

== India ==
Sections 151 and 152 of the Indian Evidence Act, 1872 forbade indecent, scandalous, insulting, offensive and irrelevant questions during cross-examinations, even if they have some significance, to prevent attempts to harass and intimidate witnesses. After the 2012 Delhi gang rape and murder, several changes were brought under the Criminal Law Amendment Act, 2013 to strengthen rape shield laws in India. A new section, 53A, was introduced to the Indian Evidence Act which stated that in prosecution for sexual offences, evidence of the victim's character or previous sexual experience with any person would not be relevant for deciding the issue of consent or its quality. Section 146 of the Indian Evidence Act was amended to include clear instructions not to refer to previous sexual history of the victim for determining the question of consent during cross-examinations.

Anonymity to survivors and victims of sexual crime in India was provided under Section 228A of the Indian Penal Code and is now found in section 72(1) of the Bharatiya Nyaya Sanhita. Anyone found breaching the anonymity of the survivor/victim can be imprisoned up to two years and shall also be liable to a fine. This protection was upheld by the Supreme Court of India in various juridical pronouncements, the last in Nipun Saxena v Union of India (2018).

== New Zealand ==
Sections 44 and 44A of the Evidence Act 2006 sets out rules for propensity evidence about a complainant's sexual experience and reputation in sexual cases. Prior to the 2006 Act, section 23A of the Evidence Act 1908, as amended by the Evidence Amendment Act 1977, set out these rules.

Section 44 protects complainants in prosecutions for sexual offences from certain questions and evidence about their sexual experience and reputation. The starting point is to exclude evidence or questions that relate to the complainant's reputation in sexual matters or to the complainant's sexual experience with a person other than the defendant. However, the judge may permit any evidence or a question about that experience if satisfied that it would be contrary to the interests of justice to exclude it because of its direct relevance to the facts in issue or to the question of the appropriate sentence (the heightened relevance test).

Section 44A provides no evidence of a complainant's sexual experience may be offered in a criminal proceeding unless the other parties have been given notice of the proposed statement, or if every other party has waived the notice requirements, or if the judge dispenses with those requirements. The section also sets out the notice requirements for evidence proposed to be offered in criminal proceedings.

Complainants are equally bound by the law, preventing them introducing evidence about their own sexual experience contrary to sections 44 and 44A.

Evidence of a complainant's sexual experience with the defendant is not subject to the heightened relevance test, although it is still subject to the general relevance test in sections 7 and 8 of the Evidence Act. This has proved to be a contentious issue, with the debate mainly centres on the perceived direct relevance of such evidence. Those in support of extending the rule to cover sexual experience with the defendant argue that evidence of previous sexual experience between the complainant and defendant should not lead to an implication that the complainant is more likely to agree to the sexual activity on another occasion. Those opposed argue that the existence of a prior sexual relationship between the complainant and the defendant will often be, or inevitably is, directly relevant.

In 2017, Law Commission began its second statutory review of the Evidence Act. In its March 2018 issues paper, it asked several questions about the operation of section 44, especially in light of two court cases:

- B (SC12/2013) v R [2013] NZSC 151, [2014] 1 NZLR 261 – What admissibility rule should apply to sexual disposition evidence?
- Best v R [2016] NZSC 122, [2017] 1 NZLR 186 – Should false and/or allegedly false complaints be treated as evidence of veracity, sexual experience, or as both?

== Philippines ==
Republic Act No. 8505, or the Rape Victim Assistance and Protection Act of 1998, was enacted around the time when the Philippine Congress began moving away from the treatment of rape as a mere crime against chastity which may be subject to compromise. Section 6 of RA 8505 provides that "evidence of complainant’s past sexual conduct, opinion thereof or of his/her reputation" shall not be admitted in prosecutions for rape. The exception is when such evidence is material and relevant to the case, but evidence shall be admitted "only to the extent that the court finds" so.

== United States ==
In the late 1970s and early 1980s, almost all jurisdictions in the United States adopted some form of rape shield statute. The laws in each state differ in the scope of sexual behaviour shielded and time limits of the shield. Many states do not permit any evidence relating to the past sexual behaviour of the victim. This encompasses evidence of specific instances of the victim's prior or subsequent sexual conduct including opinion evidence or reputation evidence.

The Violence Against Women Act of 1994 created a federal rape shield law. The military has incorporated the rape shield law into Military Rules of Evidence, Rule 412. The military's rape shield law also applies to Article 32, pre-trial proceedings. A recent news article, however, has accused defense attorneys of violating rape shield protections during a pre-trial proceeding.

In 1999, in the case of People v. Jovanovic, the New York Court of Appeals ruled that a lower court had improperly ruled as inadmissible e-mails in which the complainant in a rape case expressed her consent to, and later approval of, the encounter. The lower court ruled these e-mails inadmissible on the basis of rape shield laws; however, the Court of Appeals ruled that the previous court had misapplied those laws.

=== Identification of alleged rape victims by media outlets ===
As a matter of courtesy, most newspapers and broadcast media in the United States do not disclose the name of an alleged rape victim during the trial, and if the alleged rapist is convicted, most will continue to not identify the victim. If the case is dropped or the alleged rapist is acquitted, most media will no longer shield the name of the alleged victim. This practice was probably related to laws in some states which made it a crime to publicly reveal the name of the victim in a rape case. When such laws were challenged in court, they were routinely struck down as unconstitutional.

- In Cox Broadcasting Corp. v. Cohn 420 U.S. 469 (1975), the U.S. Supreme Court ruled unconstitutional a Georgia statute that imposed civil liability on media for publishing a rape victim's name. Cox's television station in Atlanta, WSB-TV, had obtained the victim's name from public court records—a factor the Supreme Court held to be important, noting that "the First and Fourteenth Amendments command nothing less than that the States may not impose sanctions on the publication of truthful information contained in official court records open to public inspection."
- In Florida Star v. B. J. F., 491 U.S. 524 (1989), the U.S. Supreme Court found a Florida statute which provided penalties for media outlets that publicized the name of an alleged rape victim unconstitutional.
- In State of Florida v. Globe Communications Corp., 648 So.2d 110 (Fla. 1994), the Florida Supreme Court held that a Florida criminal statute that prohibited the media from identifying the names of sexual assault victims violated the First Amendment. In that case, Globe Communications Corp. twice published the name and identifying information of a sexual assault victim, violating the Florida statute. The paper had lawfully learned the victim's name through investigation. The Florida Supreme Court relied on the U.S. Supreme Court's decision in Florida Star v. B.J.F., finding that the Florida statute barring any media publication of a rape victim's name was unconstitutional because it was "overbroad"; that is, it punished the media even if, for example, the name of the victim was already known in the community. It also found that the statute was "underinclusive" in that it punished only media publication and not acts by a private person.

== See also ==
- Post-assault treatment of sexual assault victims
- Duluth model
