= Doctrine of necessity =

Exception to laws and norms, usually invoked in grave emergencies

The doctrine of necessity is the basis on which extraordinary actions by administrative authority, which are designed to restore order or uphold fundamental constitutional principles, are considered to be lawful even if such an action contravenes established constitution, laws, norms, or conventions. The maxim on which the doctrine is based originated in the writings of the medieval jurist Henry de Bracton, and similar justifications for this kind of extra-legal action have been advanced by more recent legal authorities, including William Blackstone.

In a controversial 1954 judgment, Pakistani Chief Justice Muhammad Munir validated the extra-constitutional use of emergency powers by Governor General, Ghulam Mohammad. In his judgment, the Chief Justice cited Bracton's maxim, 'that which is otherwise not lawful is made lawful by necessity', thereby providing the label that would come to be attached to the judgment and the doctrine that it was establishing.

The doctrine of necessity may also refer to the necessity of a judge with a reasonable apprehension of bias continuing to decide a matter if there is no alternative to that judge. The Supreme Court of Canada applied this doctrine in the 1998 Reference re Remuneration of Judges (No 2) case.

== International law ==
In international law, the exception is allowed by the UN's International Law Commission (ILC) to be used by a state facing "grave and imminent peril": Under the law of State responsibility, necessity is one of the circumstances precluding the wrongfulness of conduct that would otherwise constitute a breach of an international obligation. The doctrine is recognised in Article 25 of the International Law Commission's Articles on Responsibility of States for Internationally Wrongful Acts, which reflects customary international law as recognised in international practice and judicial decisions. The defence is exceptional and may be invoked only in limited circumstances. Under Article 27 of the ILC Articles, the invocation of necessity does not terminate the underlying international obligation. Once the circumstances giving rise to necessity cease to exist, the obligation resumes and must again be performed, unless it has otherwise come to an end under international law.

1. Necessity may not be invoked by a State as a ground for precluding the wrongfulness of an act not in conformity with an international obligation of that State unless the act:

(a) is the only way for the State to safeguard an essential interest against a grave and imminent peril; and
(b) does not seriously impair an essential interest of the State or States towards which the obligation exists, or of the international community as a whole.

2. In any case, necessity may not be invoked by a State as a ground for precluding wrongfulness if:

(a) the international obligation in question excludes the possibility of invoking necessity; or
(b) the State has contributed to the situation of necessity.

— Article 25 (Necessity) of the ILC's Draft Articles on the Responsibility of States for Internationally Wrongful Acts

Therefore, an obligation of customary international law or an obligation granted under a bilateral investment treaty may be suspended under the doctrine of necessity. It is "an exception from illegality and in certain cases even as an exception from responsibility." In order to invoke the doctrine of necessity:

1. The invoking State must not have contributed to the state of necessity,
2. Actions taken were the only way to safeguard an essential interest from grave and impending danger.

== Historical development ==
The medieval English jurist Henry de Bracton is frequently cited as an early proponent of the doctrine, who presented it in the form of a maxim. He was followed by the 18th-century jurist William Blackstone, who used it to justify various laws enacted by the English parliament.

The doctrine of necessity developed from earlier concepts of self-preservation in international law. During the nineteenth century, several writers treated self-preservation as an inherent right of states that could, in exceptional circumstances, justify conduct inconsistent with international obligations. In the course of the International Law Commission's work on the law of State responsibility, necessity was formulated as a distinct circumstance precluding wrongfulness and codified separately from broader theories of self-preservation.

The 1837 Caroline incident is frequently cited in discussions of the historical development of the doctrine. During the Canadian Rebellions, British forces entered United States territory and destroyed the American vessel Caroline, which had been transporting personnel and supplies to Canadian insurgents. In the subsequent diplomatic correspondence, United States Secretary of State Daniel Webster stated that any departure from international law required a necessity that was "instant, overwhelming, leaving no choice of means, and no moment for deliberation". The correspondence between the two governments later became a frequently cited statement of the conditions governing necessity in international law.

The doctrine was subsequently considered in international adjudication. In the Russian Indemnity arbitration (1912), the tribunal accepted that necessity could, in principle, affect the performance of an international obligation where compliance would endanger the existence of the state, although it rejected the plea on the facts of the case. In his separate opinion in Oscar Chinn (1934), Judge Dionisio Anzilotti stated that necessity could excuse the non-observance of an international obligation but concluded that the conditions for invoking it had not been established in that case.

The International Law Commission examined the doctrine during its codification of the law of State responsibility. Its Special Rapporteur, Roberto Ago, proposed draft provisions on circumstances precluding wrongfulness, including necessity. Draft Article 33 was adopted on first reading in 1980. Following further consideration and revision, the provision was adopted as Article 25 of the Articles on Responsibility of States for Internationally Wrongful Acts in 2001.

The International Court of Justice recognised the doctrine in the Gabčíkovo–Nagymaros Project case (1997), holding that necessity is recognised under customary international law as a ground for precluding the wrongfulness of an internationally wrongful act. The Court also stated that the conditions for invoking necessity are exceptional and cumulative. The Court subsequently referred to Article 25 in its advisory opinion on the Legal Consequences of the Construction of a Wall in the Occupied Palestinian Territory (2004), where it found that the conditions for invoking necessity had not been satisfied.

== Examples ==
The doctrine of necessity has been invoked in a number of countries.

=== Pakistan, 1954 ===
On 24 October 1954 the Governor-General of Pakistan, Ghulam Mohammad, dissolved the Constituent Assembly and appointed a new Council of Ministers on the grounds that the existing one no longer represented the people of Pakistan. Stanley de Smith argues that the real reason for the dissolution was because Mohammad objected to the constitution which the Assembly was about to adopt. The President of the Constituent Assembly, Maulvi Tamizuddin, appealed to the Chief Court of Sindh at Karachi to restrain the new Council of Ministers from implementing the dissolution and to determine the validity of the appointment of the new Council under Section 223-A of the constitution.

In response, members of the new Council of Ministers appealed to the court saying that it had no jurisdiction to approve the request of the President to overturn the dissolution and appointments. They argued that Section 223-A of the constitution had never been validly enacted into the Constitution because it was never approved of by the Governor-General, and therefore anything submitted under it was invalid. The Chief Court of Sind ruled in favour of President Tamizuddin and held that the Governor-General's approval was not needed when the Constituent Assembly was acting only as a Constituent Assembly and not as the Federal Legislature. The Federation of Pakistan and the new Council of Ministers then appealed to the court, the appeal was heard in March 1955 (Federation of Pakistan v Maulvi Tamizuddin Khan).

In the appeal hearing under Chief Justice Muhammad Munir, the court decided that the Constituent Assembly functioned as the 'Legislature of the Domain' and that the Governor-General's assent was necessary for all legislation to become law. Therefore, the Chief Court of Sind had no jurisdiction to overturn the Governor General's dissolution and it was held as valid.

However, the ground of which the court found in favour of the Federation of Pakistan called into question the validity of all legislation passed by the Assembly, not to mention the unconstitutionality of the Assembly itself since 1950. To solve this problem, the Governor-General invoked Emergency Powers to retrospectively validate the Acts of the Constituent Assembly. An appeal was filed against the Governor-General for invoking emergency powers and the Chief Justice had to determine the constitutionality of invoking the Emergency Powers and whether the Governor-General could give his assent to legislation retroactively.

The Court held that in this case the Governor-General could not invoke emergency powers because in doing so he validated certain laws that had been invalid because he had not assented to them previously. Justice Munir also ruled that constitutional legislation could not be validated by the Governor General but had to be approved by the Legislature. The lack of a Constituent Assembly did not transfer the Legislature's powers over to the Governor-General.

The Court was referred to for an opinion. On 16 May 1955 it ruled:

1. The Governor General in certain circumstances had the power to dissolve the Constituent Assembly.
2. The Governor-General has during the interim period the power 'under the common law of civil or state necessity' of retrospectively validating the laws listed in the Schedule to the Emergency Powers ordinance.
3. The new Assembly (formed under the Constituent Convention Order 1955) would be valid and able to exercise all powers under the Indian Independence Act 1947.

In his verdict, Munir declared it was necessary to go beyond the constitution to what he claimed was the Common Law, to general legal maxims, and to English historical precedent. He relied on Bracton's maxim, 'that which is otherwise not lawful is made lawful by necessity', and the Roman law maxim urged by Ivor Jennings, 'the well-being of the people is the supreme law'.

=== Grenada, 1985 ===
In a 1985 judgment, the Chief Justice of the High Court of Grenada invoked the doctrine of necessity to validate the legal existence of a court then trying for murder the persons who had conducted a coup against former leader Maurice Bishop. The court had been established under an unconstitutional "People's Law" following the overthrow of the country's constitution, which had subsequently been restored. The defendants argued that the court before which they were being tried had no legal existence under the restored constitution, and they were therefore being deprived of their constitutional right to a trial before a "Court established by law". The High Court acknowledged that the lower court "had come into existence in an unconstitutional manner", but "the doctrine of necessity validated its acts." On this basis, the murder trials were allowed to proceed.

=== Nigeria, 2010 ===
A related (although non-judicial) use of the doctrine took place when, on 9 February 2010, the Nigerian National Assembly passed a resolution making Vice President Goodluck Jonathan the Acting President and Commander in Chief of the Armed Forces. Both chambers of the Assembly passed the resolution after President Umaru Yar'Adua, who for 78 days had been in Saudi Arabia receiving medical treatment, was unable to formally empower the vice president to exercise full powers as acting president, as provided for in Section 145 of the country's constitution. No provision of the Nigerian constitution empowering the National Assembly to pass any such resolution, causing Senate President David Mark to assert that the Senate had been guided by the "doctrine of necessity" in arriving at its decision.

=== United Kingdom, 2022–2023 ===
On 13 June 2022, United Kingdom Foreign Secretary Liz Truss introduced the Northern Ireland Protocol Bill in the House of Commons, which, if enacted, would allow the UK government to unilaterally "disapply" (the word used) parts of the Northern Ireland Protocol that it had signed up to, a part of the Brexit withdrawal agreement. The UK government conceded that the bill would mean breaching its obligations under international law but said that its position was justified, explicitly invoking the doctrine of necessity and saying that having to uphold the Protocol was placing unacceptable levels of strain on institutions in Northern Ireland and that there was "no other way" of safeguarding the UK's interests.

On 15 June, vice-president of the European Commission Maroš Šefčovič said that there was "no legal nor political justification" for the bill and that it was illegal. He also announced that the Commission would re-open the infringement proceedings against the UK government which had been started in March 2021, including two new counts where it was alleged the UK breached the Protocol.

In a session of the Public Administration and Constitutional Affairs Committee on 21 June 2022, Lorand Bartels, Professor of International Law at Trinity Hall, Cambridge, and Malgosia Fitzmaurice, Professor of Public International Law at Queen Mary University of London, were questioned about the use of the doctrine of necessity. Fitzmaurice said that necessity is the "most contentious and controversial" of circumstances which allow treaty terms to be disregarded; she stated that using necessity as a justification "should be very carefully considered" seeing as action could instead be taken using Article 16 of the protocol. Bartels suggested that the necessity doctrine could only be used to breach some parts of the protocol.

During the leadership election during the summer of 2022, Rishi Sunak said his preference was a negotiated settlement with the EU while Liz Truss, who was the minister responsible for introducing the Protocol Bill, supported it as a method to "[break] the deadlock in a legal way". Although Truss won that leadership election, she resigned soon after amid a government crisis and Sunak became prime minister.

The UK government and the European Commission made a joint statement on 27 February 2023 announcing the Windsor Framework, a legal agreement which addressed concerns around the Northern Ireland Protocol. As a result, the Northern Ireland Protocol Bill was withdrawn and allowed to lapse at the end of the 2022-23 session of parliament.

=== Bangladesh, 2024 ===
On 5 August 2024, Prime Minister Sheikh Hasina was facing mass protests has submitted her resignation to the President of Bangladesh and subsequently fled to India. General Waker-uz-Zaman has temporarily took control of the government.

On 6 August 2024, the President followed the wishes of protesters, dissolving the Jatiya Sangsad and installing Muhammad Yunus, a Nobel laureate, as leader of the interim government. While there is no constitutional basis for a caretaker government, Bangladeshi courts have upheld the legitimacy of the government under the doctrine of necessity. Court rulings have held that Hasina's resignation created a situation for which there was no constitutional remedy. Hence, the urgent need to manage state affairs made the appointment lawful.

== Application in international investment treaty tribunals ==
The doctrine of necessity has been invoked in investment treaty arbitration by states seeking to justify measures adopted during periods of economic, political, or security emergencies that are alleged to have breached obligations under bilateral or multilateral investment treaties. Investment tribunals have considered the customary international law defence of necessity reflected in Article 25 of the International Law Commission's Articles on Responsibility of States for Internationally Wrongful Acts, as well as treaty provisions containing essential security interests clauses where applicable. The doctrine has been considered in a number of arbitral proceedings involving measures adopted in response to financial crises, armed conflicts, and national security concerns.

Investment treaty tribunals have considered both the conditions for invoking the customary doctrine of necessity and the relationship between Article 25 and treaty provisions permitting states to adopt measures for the protection of their essential security interests. Where both forms of defence have been invoked, tribunals have examined the wording of the applicable treaty alongside the requirements of customary international law in determining whether the challenged measures were justified.

The doctrine was considered extensively in a series of arbitrations arising from Argentina's 2001–2002 economic crisis. Argentina invoked the customary doctrine of necessity codified in Article 25 of the International Law Commission's Articles on State Responsibility, together with the essential-security-interests clause in Article XI of its bilateral investment treaty with the United States, as a defence in dozens of arbitrations brought by investors affected by the emergency measures it adopted during the crisis, including the abandonment of currency convertibility and the "pesification" of dollar-denominated tariffs and contracts.

Tribunals in these cases reached differing conclusions on the relationship between the treaty-based defence and the customary-law defence, and on whether Argentina had met the strict conditions of Article 25. In CMS Gas Transmission Co. v. Argentina, the tribunal treated the Treaty's essential-security-interests provision and Article 25 as effectively coextensive, and found that Argentina's measures did not meet the customary-law requirement that the act be the "only way" to safeguard an essential interest, since other, less drastic responses to the crisis remained available. By contrast, the tribunal in LG&E Energy Corp. v. Argentina held that Argentina's conduct during the acute phase of the crisis, from December 2001 to April 2003, was justified under the state of necessity contemplated by both Article XI of the Treaty and general international law, and accordingly exempted Argentina from liability for that period, while still awarding compensation for breaches occurring outside it. The tribunal in Continental Casualty Co. v. Argentina took a further divergent approach, declining to treat the treaty clause as inseparable from the customary standard; because the wording of Article XI was drawn from the essential-security-interests clauses of United States "Friendship, Commerce and Navigation" treaties, which in turn reflected the general-exceptions clause of Article XX of the General Agreement on Tariffs and Trade, the tribunal considered it more appropriate to interpret "necessary" measures by reference to World Trade Organization case law on that provision than to the customary law of necessity.

The inconsistency among these outcomes, together with an ad hoc committee's partial annulment of the CMS award for its failure to distinguish the treaty and customary standards, has been widely discussed by commentators as illustrating the difficulty of applying a single customary-law framework across differently worded treaty clauses and has been described as contributing to broader debate over the coherence and legitimacy of investor-state arbitration.

A subsequent illustration of the relationship between treaty-based essential-security-interests clauses and the customary doctrine arose in CC/Devas (Mauritius) Ltd. v. India, concerning the annulment of a satellite-spectrum agreement that India said was necessary to meet its security needs. The tribunal held that the essential-security-interests clause of the applicable treaty, which stated that its protections should "not in any way limit" the state's right to act for such interests, was not to be read restrictively by importing the conditions attached to the customary necessity defence under Article 25. It reasoned that a treaty's general "preservation of rights" clause, which merely preserves protections investors might otherwise enjoy under international law, was analytically distinct from the customary necessity defence, which is available to states rather than conferring rights on investors, and that India in any event was invoking the treaty clause rather than the customary defence. The tribunal noted that this conclusion was consistent with the approach taken by the tribunal in Continental Casualty and by the ad hoc committee in the CMS annulment proceeding.
