= Beauregard v Canada =

- Supreme Court of Canada

Hearing: October 4, 1985 Judgment: September 16, 1986
- Full case name: Her Majesty The Queen v. Marc Beauregard
- Citations: [1986] 2 S.C.R. 56; 1986 CanLII 24 (S.C.C.); (1986), 30 D.L.R. (4th) 481; (1986), [1987] 26 C.R.R. 59
- Docket No.: 17884
- Prior history: Judgment for Mr. Beauregard in the Federal Court of Appeal.
- Ruling: Appeal allowed.

Holding
- A pension to which judges must contribute does not violate section 100 of the Constitution Act, 1867 and does not compromise judicial independence.

Court membership
- Chief Justice: Brian Dickson; Puisne Justices: Jean Beetz, Willard Estey, William McIntyre, Julien Chouinard, Antonio Lamer, Bertha Wilson, Gerald Le Dain, Gérard La Forest

Reasons given
- Majority: Dickson C.J., joined by Estey and Lamer JJ.
- Concur/dissent: Beetz J., joined by McIntyre J.
- Chouinard, Wilson, Le Dain, and La Forest JJ. took no part in the consideration or decision of the case.

Beauregard v Canada [1986] 2 S.C.R. 56 was a decision by the Supreme Court of Canada on judicial independence. Notably, the Court found that judicial independence is based partly on an unwritten constitution, and that some institutional independence is needed so that judges can guard the Constitution of Canada. These findings were repeated, with far-reaching consequences, in the Provincial Judges Reference (1997).

== Background ==
The case concerned section 100 of the Constitution Act, 1867. As part of a guarantee of judicial independence for federally appointed judges, the section provides that "The Salaries, Allowances, and Pensions of the Judges of the Superior, District, and County Courts (except the Courts of Probate in Nova Scotia and New Brunswick), and of the Admiralty Courts in Cases where the Judges thereof are for the Time being paid by Salary, shall be fixed and provided by the Parliament of Canada." A salary fixed by the Parliament of Canada was preferable to a salary fixed by the executive. In 1975, Parliament began to expect judges to contribute to pension costs, and a Statute Law (Superannuation) Amendment Act, 1975 was introduced. The statute dictated that judges appointed prior to February 17, 1975, should contribute 1.5% of their pay to pension costs, and judges appointed after that day would contribute 6%.

Justice Marc Beauregard, who was appointed to the Quebec Superior Court in July 1975, did not immediately have to contribute 6% since the Statute Law (Superannuation) Amendment Act was not yet officially enacted. This changed in December 1975, and Beauregard challenged the law as contrary to section 100 of the Constitution Act, 1867. He also claimed his equality rights under the Canadian Bill of Rights were infringed because he was being treated differently from other judges.

== Decision ==
The majority of the Supreme Court, whose reasons was written by Chief Justice Brian Dickson, rejected the constitutional challenge. In interpreting section 100, the Court noted that section 100 ensures federal judges will receive a salary and pension. In terms of Canadian federalism, it gave the responsibility of remuneration to the federal government. In terms of separation of powers, it gave the responsibility to Parliament and not the executive. Justice Beauregard argued section 100 also had the effect of prohibiting the lessening of benefits once they had already been granted, provided that judges should not have to contribute toward their pensions, provided that such contributions should not be taken away from salaries.

The Court noted the previous landmark judicial independence case, Valente v. The Queen (1985), established that independence belongs both to a judge and to a court as a whole. The Court now explained that this interpretation of independence was appropriate considering the roles of courts. While one role is to resolve conflicts, another was to guard the Constitution and constitutional values of the rule of law and fundamental justice. Thus, judicial independence is the "lifeblood of constitutionalism in democratic societies." The Court then explained judicial independence in Canada has more than one basis. One was the existence of federalism, as courts were needed to clarify jurisdictions, especially since Parliament no longer used its power to decide such questions, disallowance. The existence of the Canadian Charter of Rights and Freedoms, since 1982, also implies judicial independence is necessary to guard rights. Another source of judicial independence could be found in the preamble to the Constitution Act, 1867. It stated the Constitution of Canada should be "similar in Principle" to the Constitution of the United Kingdom, and judicial independence was a constitutional principle in the United Kingdom. Sections 96 to 100 of the Constitution Act, 1867 were another source.

Regarding this case, the Court noted that while traditionally judicial independence protects courts from the executive, the relationship between courts and legislatures was now at issue. This case also concerned financial security, which Dickson acknowledged was a part of judicial independence since the Act of Settlement 1701 and was reaffirmed by Valente.

With all this in mind, the Court turned to Beauregard's argument that Parliament cannot lower existing remuneration. Section 100 states that Parliament is responsible for judicial remuneration, and the question now was Parliament's limits in exercising this responsibility. Dickson started by saying that "As a general observation, Canadian judges are Canadian citizens and must bear their fair share of the financial burden of administering the country." Judges v. Attorney-General of Saskatchewan (1937) had demonstrated that judges must pay taxes. The law at issue targeted judges only, but Dickson did not regard this as damaging to judicial independence. This financial obligation did not touch the true purpose of judicial independence, namely freedom from manipulation and the separation of powers. The law merely established a conventional form of pension and did so along with a considerable rise in salaries. Dickson then clarified Parliamentary power regarding remuneration is not absolute, but what should be guarded against was decisions with sinister motivations and discrimination against judges.

Beauregard's suggestion that judges should not have to contribute to pensions owed partly to section 92(14) of the Constitution Act, 1867, which assigned the administration of justice to the provincial governments. This suggested the federal and provincial governments would have to agree to the creation of a pension to which judges must contribute. Dickson refuted this argument by saying the general effect of section 92(14) is limited by other more specific parts of the Constitution, in this case, section 100. Another interpretation of section 100 was that the type of pensions it mentioned was the kind that existed at the time of Canadian Confederation, i.e. pensions to which judges did not contribute. Moreover, the section's requirement that Parliament provides the pension could be taken as meaning Parliament alone; the section did not say judges along with Parliament had the responsibility. Dickson rejected the idea that the type of pension had to be the same as it was at Confederation in 1867 because the Constitution is meant to adapt to changing circumstances. This was the living tree doctrine. As for the notion that Parliament alone must pay for the pension, Dickson replied under section 100, Parliament must pay a pension, but section 100 did not say what percentage of a total pension.

Finally, Beauregard argued that pension limited the judges' freedom in how to spend their salaries. Dickson rejected the argument since salaries and pensions are both meant to compensate the judge, and the total compensation would have been the same if the salary raise was less and the pensions were kept the same. If the compensation would be the same anyway, Parliament was allowed some choice.

Regarding the Bill of Rights, Dickson said that it has normally been interpreted to have little effect so that statutes with valid objectives are upheld. It was too late to reconsider that strategy.

== Dissent ==
Justice Jean Beetz wrote a partial dissent. Although he agreed with Dickson regarding judicial independence, he would have found in favor of Beauregard, through the Bill of Rights. He denied that the equality rights under the Bill of Rights only prohibited racial discrimination and similar forms of discrimination, and pointed to Bora Laskin's opinion in Curr v. The Queen (1972). On the question of whether the differential treatment owed to a valid objective, Beetz agreed that the law did aim at such an objective, which was to lessen the taxes paid by other Canadians. However, Beetz also concluded that the method used to achieve this goal was improper, as it affected equality too deeply and judicial acceptance of these kinds of government actions would make the right meaningless. Laws may treat people differently, but this treatment must not be arbitrary. Moreover, Beetz found that with a valid objective, a law may still violate the Bill of Rights if it "goes beyond what is necessary to reach a desirable social objective."

Turning to the case, Beetz found the measures taken by Parliament were not all necessary. There seemed to be no compelling reason why the date was chosen regarding which judges would contribute what. The date the law officially came into effect would have likely been more appropriate. If this were done, some differential treatment in the form of grandfather clauses would have been acceptable. If this were done, all judges appointed after the date could be reasonably expected to know they would have to pay the 6%, whereas Beauregard was surprised when the change was made.

== See also ==
- List of Supreme Court of Canada cases (Dickson Court)
- Mackeigan v. Hickman
- R. v. Généreux
- Therrien (Re)
- Provincial Court Judges' Assn. of New Brunswick v. New Brunswick (Minister of Justice)
