= R v Morales =

- Supreme Court of Canada

Hearing: May 28, 1992 Judgment: November 19, 1992
- Full case name: Her Majesty The Queen v Maximo Morales
- Citations: [1992] 3 S.C.R. 711
- Ruling: For Morales. The words "in the public interest" under section 515 of the Code be declared of no force or effect.

Court membership
- Chief Justice: Antonio Lamer; Puisne Justices: Gérard La Forest, Claire L'Heureux-Dubé, John Sopinka, Charles Gonthier, Peter Cory, Beverley McLachlin, Frank Iacobucci, John C. Major

Reasons given
- Majority: Lamer J., joined by La Forest, Sopinka, McLachlin and Iacobucci JJ.
- Concurrence: Gonthier J., joined by L'Heureux-Dube J.

Laws applied
- Section 11(e), Charter; R. v. Pearson, [1992] 3 S.C.R. 000; R. v. Oakes, [1986] 1 S.C.R. 103; R. v. Hufsky, [1988] 1 S.C.R. 621

R v Morales, [1992] 3 S.C.R. 711, is a case decided by the Supreme Court of Canada. The Court found that the "public interest" basis for pre-trial detention under section 515 of the Criminal Code violated section 11(e) of the Canadian Charter of Rights and Freedoms, the right not to be denied reasonable bail, as it authorized detention on vague and imprecise grounds, and could not be saved by section 1.

== Background ==
Decision maker Maximo Morales was being investigated in his participation in a cocaine importation ring in Canada. He was arrested in December 1990 and charged with trafficking and possession for the purpose of trafficking under the Narcotics Control Act and Criminal Code.

At his bail hearing the judge denied his release and ordered him to be detained until the trial. The detention was based on section 515 of the Code which allowed detention where it "is necessary in the public interest or for the protection or safety of the public, having regard to all the circumstances including any substantial likelihood that the accused will ... commit a criminal offence or interfere with the administration of justice".

Morales applied for a review of the judge's order. He was granted release with conditions. The release was appealed to the Supreme Court of Canada. The issue before the Supreme Court was whether the "public interest" component of section 515 violated sections 7, 9, 11(d) or 11(e) of the Charter, and if so, whether it could be saved under section 1.

== Opinion of the Court ==
Chief Justice Lamer, for the majority, found that the "public interest" component violated the accused right not to be denied reasonable bail under section 11(e) of the Charter and could not be saved under section 1. He ordered the words "in the public interest" be declared of no force or effect.

Lamer examined the phrase "in the public interest" and found that it was vague and imprecise, and so could not be used to frame a legal debate that could produce a structured rule. Thus, the phrase violated the doctrine of vagueness and authorized detention without "just cause". On the justification analysis under section 1, he found that the provision was not rationally connected to its purpose as it allowed pre-trial detention where it was not related to the objective. It also failed to be minimally impairing, as it permitted more detentions than necessary, and it was not proportional, as the deleterious effect outweighed the objective.

== See also ==
- List of Supreme Court of Canada cases
