= R v O'Connor =

- Supreme Court of Canada

Hearing: 1995: February 1; Judgment: 1995: December 14.
- Citations: [1995] 4 SCR 411
- Docket No.: 24114
- Prior history: APPEAL from the COURT OF APPEAL FOR BRITISH COLUMBIA
- Ruling: Appeal dismissed

Court membership
- Chief Justice: Antonio Lamer; Puisne Justices: Gérard La Forest, Claire L'Heureux-Dubé, John Sopinka, Charles Gonthier, Peter Cory, Beverley McLachlin, Frank Iacobucci, John C. Major

Reasons given
- Majority: La Forest, L'Heureux-Dube, Gonthier and McLachlin JJ.
- Concurrence: Cory and Iacobucci JJ
- Dissent: Lamer C.J. and Sopinka and Major JJ.

R v O'Connor, [1995] 4 S.C.R. 411 is a leading Supreme Court of Canada decision on disclosure of medical records. O’Connor was accused of and charged with rape and indecent assault of four women. The Court held that the medical and counselling records of a complainant in a sexual assault case that are held by a third party can be disclosed by order of the judge if they meet two requirements.

First, the applicant must establish, without seeing them, that the records are likely to be relevant to the case. Second, the judge must review the records and decide whether to disclose them based on the balancing the right to make full answer and defence, and the right to privacy.

The O'Connor involved in the case was Hubert Patrick O'Connor, a Catholic bishop from British Columbia who was found guilty of sex crimes in 1991.

== See also ==
- List of Supreme Court of Canada cases (Lamer Court)
- R v Mills (1999)
