= Mackeigan v Hickman =

- Supreme Court of Canada

Hearing: Judgment: October 5, 1989
- Docket No.: 21315
- Prior history: from NS Court of Appeal
- Ruling: Appeal dismissed

Court membership
- Chief Justice: Brian Dickson; Puisne Justices: William McIntyre, Antonio Lamer, Bertha Wilson, Gérard La Forest, Claire L'Heureux-Dubé, John Sopinka, Charles Gonthier, Peter Cory

Reasons given
- Majority: McLachlin J., joined by L'Heureux‑Dubé and Gonthier JJ.
- Concurrence: Lamer J.
- Concurrence: La Forest J.
- Concur/dissent: Wilson J.
- Concur/dissent: Cory J.
- Dickson C.J. took no part in the consideration or decision of the case.

Mackeigan v Hickman, [1989] 2 S.C.R. 796 is a leading Supreme Court of Canada decision on judicial independence. The Court unanimously held that to require a federal judge to explain his or her decisions would violate the principle of judicial independence.

== Background ==
Donald Marshall was an Aboriginal youth who was wrongly convicted of murder in 1971. In 1983, the federal government, on the basis of new evidence, referred the case to the Nova Scotia Court of Appeal who overturned the conviction.

The panel which heard the reference included Justice Pace who was the Attorney General of Nova Scotia at the time of the investigation in 1971. At the end of the Court's judgement it was observed that Marshall was largely at fault for his own conviction by misleading the investigation and that "any miscarriage of justice was more apparent than real". This comment had a major effect on the amount of settlement Marshall received.

In 1986, the Nova Scotia government established a royal commission, under the Public Inquiries Act, to investigate the handling of the Marshall case. As part of the investigation the Commission tried to compel the judges on the reference, including Pace, to testify. The judges (Ian M. MacKeigan, Gordon L. S. Hart, Malachi C. Jones, Angus L. Macdonald, and Leonard L. Pace) applied for a declaration that the Commission had no authority to compel them as they were protected by judicial immunity.

The Supreme Court considered two issues:

1. whether ss. 3 and 4 of the Public Inquiries Act could be used to compel superior court judges to testify before the Commission, either with respect to how and why they reached their decision or with respect to the composition of the panel that heard the case.
2. whether the direction to the Commission to inquire into a reference by the Minister of Justice was ultra vires the Province because it is a matter of criminal law and procedure reserved exclusively to the federal Parliament under s. 91(27) of the Constitution Act, 1867.

The majority held that the judges could not be compelled and that the direction to the Commission was not ultra vires the province.

== Reasons of the court ==
Three reasons were written for the majority.

Justice McLachlin, writing for L'Heureux-Dubé and Gonthier, held that,

the judge's right to refuse to answer to the executive or legislative branches of government or their appointees as to how and why the judge arrived at a particular judicial conclusion is essential to the personal independence of the judge...To entertain the demand that a judge testify before a civil body, or emanation of the legislature or executive, on how and why he or she made his or her decision would be to strike at the most sacrosanct core of judicial independence

== See also ==
- List of Supreme Court of Canada cases (Dickson Court)
- Valente v. The Queen
- Beauregard v. Canada
- R. v. Généreux
- Provincial Judges Reference
- Therrien (Re)
- Provincial Court Judges' Assn. of New Brunswick v. New Brunswick (Minister of Justice)
