= Provincial Court Judges' Assn of New Brunswick v New Brunswick (Minister of Justice) =

- Supreme Court of Canada

Hearing: November 9–10, 2004 Judgment: Decided July 22, 2005
- Full case name: Provincial Court Judges’ Association of New Brunswick, Honourable Judge Michael McKee and Honourable Judge Steven Hutchinson v Her Majesty The Queen in Right of the Province of New Brunswick, as represented by the Minister of Justice
- Citations: [2005] 2 S.C.R. 286; 2005 SCC 44 (CanLII); (2005), 288 N.B.R. (2d) 202; (2005), 255 D.L.R. (4th) 513; (2005), 30 Admin. L.R. (4th) 1; (2005), 201 O.A.C. 293
- Docket No.: 30006
- Prior history: Judgment for the Crown in the Court of Appeal for New Brunswick.

Holding
- The reasons given by the governments of Alberta, Ontario and New Brunswick for not following judicial remuneration recommendations were rational.

Court membership
- Chief Justice: Beverley McLachlin; Puisne Justices: John C. Major, Michel Bastarache, Ian Binnie, Louis LeBel, Marie Deschamps, Morris Fish, Rosalie Abella, Louise Charron

Reasons given
- Unanimous reasons by: The Court

Provincial Court Judges' Assn of New Brunswick v New Brunswick (Minister of Justice); Ontario Judges Assn v Ontario (Management Board); Bodner v Alberta; Conférence des juges du Québec v Quebec (AG); Minc v Quebec (AG) [2005] 2 S.C.R. 286 was a decision by the Supreme Court of Canada in which the Court attempted to resolve questions about judicial independence left over from the landmark Provincial Judges Reference (1997). The Court found that government remuneration of provincial court judges that is lower than what an independent salary commission recommended can be justified. A broader perspective should be taken whether overall conditions of judicial independence have been met and some deference to the government is needed.

== Background ==
The decision arose from cases from four different provinces, namely Provincial Court Judges’ Assn. of New Brunswick v. New Brunswick (Minister of Justice) from New Brunswick, Ontario Judges’ Assn. v. Ontario (Management Board) from Ontario, Bodner v. Alberta from Alberta, and Conférence des juges du Québec v. Quebec (Attorney General); Minc v. Quebec (Attorney General) from Quebec. Each case involved interpretation of how to properly pay provincial court judges. The cases arose following the Provincial Judges Reference, which found that in order to ensure salaries are free of political manipulation, independent salary commissions should recommend salaries and governments could deviate from recommendations only for rational reasons. This finding was grounded in principles found in the preamble to the Constitution Act, 1867. As the Supreme Court admitted in its 2005 decision, in attempting to ease relations between courts and government, "The Reference has not provided the anticipated solution, and more is needed."

Specifically, in each of the four cases there were disputes as to what reasons for not following recommendations were rational. Since it was found commissions should have a "meaningful effect" on remuneration, some courts suggested that the recommendations must be followed. In Alberta, the courts won their case against the government before the Alberta Court of Appeal. The government of Alberta, in not accepting some of the recommendations, noted its economic responsibilities and that compared to other salaries, the recommended judicial salaries were very large. The Court of Appeal, conversely, thought that the requirement that government reasons be rational should be a very difficult test to pass and only "extraordinary circumstances" could justify not following recommendations. This was based on the fact that the 1997 Reference had mentioned the Anti-Inflation Reference of 1976, which dealt with the definition of economic emergencies.

== Decision ==
The decision of the Supreme Court was unanimous and written by "The Court" (i.e., not attributed to a particular judge). In it, the Court quickly dismissed the notion that commission recommendations are mandatory on the grounds that this contradicted the 1997 Reference. The Supreme Court also found that rational justification for not following recommendations could be defined as the government giving full reasons that address the Commissions' points. The government must operate in good faith and its decisions must be constitutional. An irrational rejection would be "Bald expressions of rejection or disapproval." The Court added that salaries of judges could be compared with salaries of other government workers as long as the governments explains how they selected who is compared to whom. New evidence can also be cited for not following recommendations, including discoveries that a recommendations' evidence is inaccurate.

When government reasons are legally challenged, the Supreme Court instructs reviewing courts to exercise deference to the government. Following the 1997 Reference, the Supreme Court found reviewing courts should ask two questions, namely whether reasons are given by the government and whether they are reasonable. In 2005, the Court announced that "We are now adding a third stage which requires the reviewing judge to view the matter globally and consider whether the overall purpose of the commission process has been met." This "global perspective" requires a general evaluation of the situation, questions whether the government has acted rationally despite some small flaws in the government's reasons, and some deference to the government.

As for the Anti-Inflation Reference, the Court in 2005 noted that mention of it in the 1997 Reference was merely to demonstrate what constitutes a reviewing method. It was not to say that reasons for not following recommendations should be made only in light of economic emergencies.

Applying these new standards to the four cases, the Supreme Court found only the Quebec government's reasons were irrational. The Supreme Court faulted the Quebec government for not addressing the main recommendations.

== See also ==
- List of Supreme Court of Canada cases (McLachlin Court)
- Judicial Compensation and Benefits Commission
- Valente v. The Queen
- Beauregard v. Canada
- Mackeigan v. Hickman
- R. v. Généreux
- Therrien (Re)
