= Valente v R =

- Supreme Court of Canada

Hearing: 9–10 October 1984 Judgment: 19 December 1985
- Full case name: Walter Valente v Her Majesty The Queen
- Citations: [1985] 2 SCR 673
- Docket No.: 17583
- Prior history: Judgment for the Crown in the Court of Appeal for Ontario.

Holding
- Judges in the Provincial Court of Ontario are independent for purposes of section 11(d) of the Canadian Charter of Rights.

Court membership
- Chief Justice: Brian Dickson; Puisne Justices: Roland Ritchie, Jean Beetz, Willard Estey, William McIntyre, Julien Chouinard, Antonio Lamer, Bertha Wilson, Gerald Le Dain

Reasons given
- Unanimous reasons by: Le Dain J.
- Ritchie and Wilson JJ. took no part in the consideration or decision of the case.

Valente v R, [1985] 2 S.C.R. 673 is a leading Supreme Court of Canada decision on protection of judicial independence under section 11(d) of the Canadian Charter of Rights and Freedoms.

== Background ==
A Provincial Court of Ontario judge held that he could not decide a sentence appeal for a conviction of careless driving under the Ontario Highway Traffic Act because he was not in a position to judge whether he was independent, and a person charged with an offense has a right to an independent tribunal under section 11(d) of the Charter. (Upon review, appellate courts chose to interpret the judge's decision as holding that he was not sitting as an independent judge under the meaning of section 11(d) of the Charter). Section 11(d) had come into effect in 1982; until then, only higher-level judges were independent under the Constitution. The concern was that the judiciary was vulnerable to the influence of the executive of the government. Among the listed specific concerns were that the executive set the salaries, the manner in which the executive can appoint and re-appoint judges, and the fact that judges are referred to as mere "civil servants" and receive the same sick leave and insurance plans, and the fact that the legislature does not need to approve a judge being removed from the bench. (Under the Constitution Act, 1867, the removal of higher-level judges must be approved by the Parliament of Canada.)

The Court of Appeal for Ontario held that the provincial court was an independent tribunal and so did have jurisdiction.

The issue before the Supreme Court was whether a provincial court judge is sufficiently independent given their salaries and tenure.

== Opinion of the Court ==
The Court held that provincial court judges had sufficient independence. The Court stated that a judge needs to be impartial and independent. Impartiality is "a state of mind" while independence is the quality of the relationship the judge has with the executive. The Court went on to say that even if a court acts as if it is independent, if its "objective status" does not match that of an independent court section 11(d) is triggered. Thus, section 11(d) can be considered through a test in which one asks whether it seems reasonable to believe a court is independent. This thus ensures the court has "respect and acceptance."

The Court gave three requirements for judicial independence within the meaning of section 11(d) of the Charter. There must be 1) security of tenure, 2) financial security, and 3) institutional independence in administrative matters relevant to the functioning of the judge.

On the facts, the Court found that all three requirements had been satisfied. The Court noted that difficult standards for judicial independence could not be set because section 11(d) applied to too many different types of tribunals. Thus, the degree of independence for higher-level judges under the Constitution Act, 1867 could not be found under section 11(d). The Court found that while the security of tenure of the provincial courts was not perfect, the fact that there must be a reason for the removal of a judge and that there be a review carried out not by the executive was enough.

As for salaries, Ontario at the time took recommendations from a salary commission. This was enough to suggest serious thought goes into the setting of the salaries, though the Supreme Court added such committees may not be needed in every case. The fact that there was a law ensuring judges should have remuneration was also taken as important. Regarding comparisons of judges to civil servants, the Supreme Court said that this was not meant to suggest the government has as much control over judges as over civil servants, or to devalue the role of judges. It was enough that the salaries be secure.

Finally, the Court turned to administrative independence. The Supreme Court noted the provincial courts already independently decided which judges should hear what cases. Those who questioned the independence of the provincial courts suggested the courts should also gain more control over their budgets, salaries and how judges are promoted. The Supreme Court replied more independence may be "highly desirable," but it was not "essential for purposes of s. 11(d)."

== Aftermath ==
Judicial independence would later be extended under the Provincial Judges Reference of 1997, which followed Valente in stating that judges should enjoy administrative independence; however, this meant overturning obiter dicta in Valente that judicial salary commissions were not needed to ensure a salary is free of political manipulation.

== See also ==
- List of Supreme Court of Canada cases (Dickson Court)
- Beauregard v Canada
- R v Généreux
- MacKeigan v Hickman
- Re Therrien
- Provincial Court Judges' Assn of New Brunswick v New Brunswick (Minister of Justice)
