= Section 13 of the Canadian Charter of Rights and Freedoms =

Constitutional bar on self-crimination

Section 13 of the Canadian Charter of Rights and Freedoms is a section of the Charter which, along with section 11 (c), specifies rights regarding self-incrimination.

It reads:

13. A witness who testifies in any proceedings has the right not to have any incriminating evidence so given used to incriminate that witness in any other proceedings, except in a prosecution for perjury or for the giving of contradictory evidence.

Rights against self-incrimination had existed in Canadian law even before the Charter, but these applied to cases in which an individual might incriminate him or herself while giving testimony in another person's trial. Since the enactment of the Charter, the right has been extended in case law in regard to retrials, to exclude from one's retrial self-incriminating evidence if it had been obtained during cross examination in the last trial.

This section serves a similar purpose as the Fifth Amendment to the United States Constitution, but does not provide witnesses the same opportunity to excuse themselves from testifying.

In R. v. Nedelcu, 2012 SCC 59, a majority of the Supreme Court of Canada found that the prosecution in a criminal trial could use prior inconsistent testimony from a civil trial to impeach an accused person's credibility.
