= R v Mills =

- Supreme Court of Canada

Hearing: January 19, 1999 Judgment: November 25, 1999
- Citations: [1999] 3 S.C.R. 668
- Docket No.: 26358

Court membership
- Chief Justice: Antonio Lamer; Puisne Justices: Claire L'Heureux-Dubé, Charles Gonthier, Beverley McLachlin, Frank Iacobucci, John C. Major, Michel Bastarache, Ian Binnie, Louise Arbour

Reasons given
- Majority: McLachlin and Iacobucci JJ., joined by L’Heureux-Dubé, Gonthier, Major, Bastarache and Binnie JJ.
- Concur/dissent: Lamer C.J.

See R v Mills (disambiguation) for other cases by same name

R v Mills, [1999] 3 S.C.R. 668 is a leading Supreme Court of Canada decision where the Court upheld the newly enacted rape shield law when challenged as a violation to section 7 and 11(d) of the Canadian Charter of Rights and Freedoms. The rape shield law was the second of its type, the first having been struck down in R. v. Seaboyer. Accordingly, this case is often cited as an example of judicial dialogue.

== Background ==
Mills was an accused charged with sexual assault and unlawful sexual touching. Counsel for Mills obtained medical records from a counselling organization, and further sought records from a psychiatrist and the child and adolescent services association. However, during the trial in 1997 the parliament of Canada passed Bill C-46 which introduced sections 278.1 to 278.91 into the Criminal Code which concerned the production of records for sexual offences.

Mills challenged the constitutionality of these provisions under section 7 and 11(d) of the Charter. The trial judge found that the provisions did violate the Charter and were not saved under section 1.

In a seven to one decision, the Court held that the provisions were constitutional, overturning the trial judge.

== Reasons of the court ==
Justices McLachlin and Iacobucci, writing for the majority, found that the new provisions provided the judge with enough discretion to preserve the complainant's right to privacy and equality while still allowing for the accused to provide a full answer and defence.

== See also ==
- List of Supreme Court of Canada cases (Lamer Court)
- R v Seaboyer
