= Mills v The Queen =

Supreme Court of Canada Charter case

- Supreme Court of Canada

Hearing: June 6, 7, 1984 Rehearing: October 9, 1985 Judgment: June 26, 1986
- Citations: [1986] 1 S.C.R. 863, 1986 CanLII 17 (SCC)
- Docket No.: 17818
- Ruling: Appeal dismissed

Court membership
- Chief Justice: Brian Dickson; Puisne Justices: Jean Beetz, Willard Estey, William McIntyre, Julien Chouinard, Antonio Lamer, Bertha Wilson, Gerald Le Dain, Gérard La Forest

Reasons given
- Plurality: McIntyre J. (Beetz and Chouinard JJ. concurring)
- Concurrence: La Forest J.
- Dissent: Lamer J. (Dickson C.J. concurring)
- Dissent: Wilson J.
- Estey and Le Dain JJ. took no part in the consideration or decision of the case.

Laws applied
- Canadian Charter of Rights and Freedoms, s. 11(b) and s. 24(1)

Mills v The Queen is a constitutional decision of the Supreme Court of Canada concerning the meaning of the phrase a "court of competent jurisdiction" under section 24(1) of the Canadian Charter of Rights and Freedoms, which is relevant to the remedial powers of the courts.

In two sets of reasons, a majority held that the term "court of competent jurisdiction" for Charter remedies is to be determined by reviewing the existing jurisdiction of a court. Claims for Charter remedies are to be assessed within that existing jurisdictional framework. Section 24(1) of the Charter does not itself confer jurisdiction on a court.

The applicant had applied to a preliminary inquiry judge for a stay of criminal charges, alleging that his right to a trial within a reasonable time, as guaranteed by s. 11(b) of the Charter, had been breached by a 31 month delay. A majority of the court held that under the jurisdictional framework of the Criminal Code, a preliminary inquiry judge does not have jurisdiction to determine a claim that a trial has not proceeded within a reasonable time. That determination normally can only be made by the trial court, although in some cases the provincial superior court will also have jurisdiction.

Mills remains a valuable precedent for questions of competent jurisdiction under s. 24 of the Charter.

== Background ==
The facts of the case relating to charges faced by Mills are confusing, as stated by Justice Lamer in his dissenting reasons.

Mills had been convicted in 1973 for his involvement in a robbery, but escaped from the penitentiary. While he was unlawfully at large, he was charged in Sarnia, Ontario with new counts of armed robbery. He appeared in court on a false name in March 1977, and was released on bail. He then jumped bail. Also in March 1977, he was charged with a different count of armed robbery in London, Ontario.

In October 1979, he was arrested in Nova Scotia and returned to Sarnia. Eventually, the Sarnia charges against him were dropped, and he was returned to penitentiary to serve his outstanding sentence from 1973.

Nothing was done on the London charges until his release from penitentiary was imminent. He was taken to London in September 1981, where the matter was set down for a preliminary inquiry. That was adjourned from time to time until May 1982.

The Canadian Charter of Rights and Freedoms came into force on April 17, 1982. When he appeared at his preliminary inquiry in May, Mills applied for a stay of proceedings. He argued that the 31 months that had elapsed between his arrest in October 1979 and the commencement of the preliminary inquiry in May 1982 infringed his right to trial within a reasonable time, contrary to s. 11(b) of the Charter.

== Decisions of the Ontario courts ==
=== Preliminary inquiry judge ===
Under the Criminal Code, a preliminary inquiry is held to review the evidence brought forward by the Crown prosecutor in support of a charge. It is not the function of the preliminary inquiry judge to make findings of fact or assess the weight of the evidence. Rather, the preliminary inquiry judge is to review the evidence and determine if it is sufficient to warrant sending the matter to trial in a superior court.

On the application for a stay of proceedings, the first issue was whether the preliminary inquiry judge was a "court of competent jurisdiction", as that phrase is used in s. 24(1) of the Charter, and therefore could consider whether the 31 month delay amounted to a breach of Mills's right to a trial within a reasonable time. The preliminary inquiry judge concluded that he was a court of competent jurisdiction.

Turning then to the issue of trial delay, the preliminary inquiry judge held that since the Charter came into force just a month earlier, the right to a trial within a reasonable time only began on April 17, 1982. There had therefore not been an unreasonable delay.

=== High Court of Ontario ===
Mills then applied to the motions court of the High Court of Ontario for relief under the prerogative writs: an order of prohibition, to bar the preliminary inquiry judge from proceeding with the preliminary, and an order of certiorari, quashing the charges set out in the information. He also applied for a remedy under s. 24(1) of the Charter, based on trial delay. The motions judge held that the preliminary inquiry judge was a court of competent jurisdiction, and that the guarantee of a trial within a reasonable time did apply. However, the motions judge concluded that on all of the facts, there had not been a breach of s. 11(b).

=== Ontario Court of Appeal ===
Mills then appealed to the Ontario Court of Appeal. That court did not rule on whether the preliminary inquiry judge was a court of competent jurisdiction, but agreed with the motions judge that there had not been a breach of the right to a trial within a reasonable time. The Court of Appeal directed that the matter be remanded to the preliminary inquiry judge for review to determine if Mills should be committed to stand trial.

== Judgment of the Supreme Court of Canada ==
=== Hearing and rehearing ===
There were two hearings before the Supreme Court. The first hearing was on June 6 and 7, 1984, before Chief Justice Dickson and Justices Ritchie, Beetz, Estey, Chouinard, Lamer and Wilson. The court reserved its decision. On September 29, 1984, while the case was on reserve, the federal government appointed Estey to hold a public inquiry into the failure of two federally chartered banks. Then Ritchie retired just over a month later, on November 1, 1984, due to ill health.

The court reheard the case on October 9, 1985, before a differently constituted panel: Dickson, Beetz, McIntyre, Chouinard, Lamer, Wilson and La Forest (who had been appointed to Ritchie's vacant seat).

The court deliberated for over half a year, and gave its decision on June 26, 1986. It dismissed the appeal by a 4-3 split, but with no single set of majority reasons.

=== Majority Reasons ===
There was no single majority decision. Instead, there were two sets of reasons which reached similar results. Taken together, they dismissed the appeal and returned the case to the preliminary inquiry judge, without ruling on the delay issue.

==== McIntyre ====
McIntyre, writing for a plurality of himself, Beetz, and Chouinard, dismissed the appeal. He agreed with the outcome in the courts below, but for different reasons, based on his interpretation of the meaning of "a court of competent jurisdiction" under s. 24(1) of the Charter. He held that the Charter is not itself a grant of jurisdiction to the courts. Rather, jurisdiction is set by Parliament and the provincial Legislatures when they enact statutes governing court structure. Claims under the Charter must be fit into the existing jurisdictional structure of the courts.

In this particular case, a preliminary inquiry judge has very limited jurisdiction under the Criminal Code, being concerned only with a review of the evidence to determine if there is sufficient evidence to warrant setting the matter down for trial in the superior court. Since the preliminary inquiry judge has no jurisdiction under the Criminal Code to make any final order determining the case, they do not have jurisdiction to enter a stay for breach of a Charter right.

Instead, it is the trial courts that have jurisdiction to determine the trial delay issue. Since they have full jurisdiction over the case under the Criminal Code, including the power to stay charges, the trial courts are courts of competent jurisdiction for Charter relief in connection with trial delay before that court.

With respect to the applications to the motions judge, McIntyre held that a superior court may have jurisdiction to give Charter relief, but that jurisdiction must be exercised in light of the jurisdiction of the trial courts. It is the trial courts which normally will determine Charter claims, but in some cases it may be appropriate for the superior court to entertain a Charter claim, even when it is not the trial court.

McIntyre therefore concluded that the matter should be remitted to the preliminary inquiry judge to determine if there was sufficient evidence to commit Mills to stand trial. If he was committed to stand trial, it would be the trial court which could consider whether there had been a breach of the right to trial within a reasonable time. McIntyre did not express an opinion on that point.

==== La Forest ====
La Forest wrote concurring reasons, in which he generally agreed with the approach taken by McIntyre. He expressed some doubt whether a stay of proceedings was always the correct remedy for trial delay, and wondered if a court should instead find ways to expedite a trial to remedy the delay. He agreed that the matter should be remanded to the preliminary inquiry judge.

=== Dissents ===
==== Lamer ====
Lamer wrote dissenting reasons for himself and Dickson.

==== Wilson ====
Wilson also dissented.

== Precedential status ==
The Supreme Court has repeatedly cited Mills v The Queen, usually as "applied" or "followed".

== See also ==
- List of Supreme Court of Canada cases
