= Section 11 of the Canadian Charter of Rights and Freedoms =

Constitutional provision regarding criminal trials

Section 11 of the Canadian Charter of Rights and Freedoms is the section of the Canadian Constitution that protects a person's legal rights in criminal and penal matters. There are nine enumerated rights protected in section 11.

== Right to be informed of the offence ==
Section 11(a) provides that

11. Any person charged with an offence has the right

(a) to be informed without unreasonable delay of the specific offence;

The right of a person charged with an offence to be informed of the offence originated in section 510 of the Criminal Code as well as legal tradition. Some courts have used section 510 to help read section 11(a), concluding that the right allows for a person to be "reasonable informed" of the charge; thus it does not matter if a summons simply summarizes a charge.

In R. v. Nova Scotia Pharmaceutical Society the Supreme Court of Canada found that an open-ended statute (prohibiting companies from "unduly" lessening competition) was not a breach of Section 11(a).

In R. v. Delaronde (1997), the Supreme Court of Canada found section 11 (a) is meant not only to guarantee a fair trial but also to serve as an economic right. A person must be informed of charges quickly because they will then have to deal with their career and family life in light of the charges. Thus, those who suffer economically because of delayed information of charges have had their rights under section 11(a) infringed, and they may receive a remedy under section 24 of the Charter.

== Right to be tried within a reasonable time ==
Section 11(b) provides that

11. Any person charged with an offence has the right...

(b) to be tried within a reasonable time;

Section 11(b) can be taken to provide a right to a speedy trial. The criteria by which the court will consider whether the rights of an accused under this provision have been infringed were set out in R. v. Askov (1990). In R. v. Morin, [1992] 1 S.C.R. 771, the Supreme Court of Canada clarified the test set out in Askov, noting that the accused bears a certain onus to demonstrate actual prejudice as a result of delay. In cases of very extensive delay, however, the court found that prejudice could be inferred.

Later, in R. v. Finta (1994), the Supreme Court clarified that the period of "unreasonable delay" begins at the time the charge is laid. This was in response to a case in which charges were laid 45 years after the alleged offences occurred; and that this was suggested to be an unreasonable delay. Reasonableness depends, in part, on the amount of investigative work that is involved, the number of interested parties and their locations, and/or the complexity of the case. Reasonableness also relates to local court resources and/or how they compare to other jurisdictions. Other elements in determining reasonableness of delay could include delays by either the Crown attorney or defense counsel, or even the Court itself.

In R. v. Jordan (2016), the Supreme Court established that a delay longer than 18 months from when a charge is laid to the trial's completion is "presumptively unreasonable" and any delay by the Crown beyond that time that is not justified by exceptional circumstances that are either unforeseeable or beyond the Crown's control must result in a stay of proceedings. When a preliminary inquiry is held or the accused is tried in superior court, the presumptive ceiling is extended to 30 months.

== Right not to be compelled to be a witness ==
Section 11(c) provides that

11. Any person charged with an offence has the right ...

(c) not to be compelled to be a witness in proceedings against that person in respect of the offence;

This provides a right against self-incrimination. R. v. Hebert, [1990] 2 SCR 151 confirms that this right extends to situations where the police employ "unfair tricks" such as sending an undercover police officer to pose as a sympathetic cellmate.

Another right against self-incrimination can be found in section 13 of the Charter.

== Right to be presumed innocent ==
Section 11(d) provides that:

11. Any person charged with an offence has the right ...

(d) to be presumed innocent until proven guilty according to law in a fair and public hearing by an independent and impartial tribunal;

This right has generated some case law, as courts have struck down reverse onus clauses as violating the presumption of innocence. This first occurred in R. v. Oakes (1986) in respect to the Narcotics Control Act. This was also the case in which the Court developed the primary test for measuring rights limitations under section 1 of the Charter. The Court found having a reverse onus clause was not rational in fighting narcotics traffic since one could not assume a person found with narcotics means to traffic it. In R. v. Stone, the question of automatism was considered, with the Court deciding that while shifting the burden of proof to the defendant was a violation of section 11, it could be justified under section 1 because criminal law presumes willing actions.

In R. v. Hill, 2012 ONSC 5050, the Ontario Superior Court of Justice found that the principle of presumption of innocence applies not only to a trial on the facts, but also to sentencing in circumstances where the Crown alleges that the accused is a "dangerous offender".

The reference to a fair hearing allows one a right to "full answer and defence", a right also based in section 7 of the Charter ("fundamental justice"). This has led to a controversial string of decisions surrounding the rape shield law, starting with R. v. Seaboyer (1991) and ending with R. v. Mills (1999). In R. v. Rowbotham, (1988), the Ontario Court of Appeal found that Section 11(d), when read in conjunction with Section 7, requires the appointment of counsel for an accused who is facing a serious criminal charge, not capable of representing himself, and not financially able to retain counsel.

The reference to an independent and impartial tribunal has also been taken as granting a measure of judicial independence to lower-court judges specializing in criminal law, judicial independence previously being a right held only by superior courts under the Constitution Act, 1867. In the case Valente v. The Queen (1985), judicial independence under section 11 was held to be limited. Although it would include financial security, security of tenure and some administrative independence, the Court found the standards enjoyed by higher-level judges was too high for the many tribunals covered by section 11(d). In the Provincial Judges Reference (1997) expectations for judicial independence were heightened, with reference made to the preamble of the Constitution Act, 1867, which was said to imply judicial independence was an unwritten constitutional value applying to all judges in Canada. The requirement of an independent and impartial tribunal applies also to juries. Constitutional scholar Peter Hogg has written that jury selection under the Criminal Code would undoubtedly create an independent tribunal. However, he points to R. v. Bain (1992) in which the impartiality of the jury was questioned, since the Crown had more say in selection.

== Right not to be denied reasonable bail ==
Section 11(e) provides that

11. Any person charged with an offence has the right...

(e) not to be denied reasonable bail without just cause;

The right to reasonable bail was examined in R. v. Morales (1992) when a person was denied bail under section 515 of the Criminal Code, which allowed detention where it "is necessary in the public interest or for the protection or safety of the public, having regard to all the circumstances including any substantial likelihood that the accused will ... commit a criminal offence or interfere with the administration of justice". Chief Justice Lamer, for the majority of the Supreme Court, found that the "public interest" component violated the accused right not to be denied reasonable bail under section 11(e) of the Charter and could not be saved under section 1. He ordered the words "in the public interest" be declared of no force or effect. Lamer examined the phrase "in the public interest" and found that it was vague and imprecise, and so could not be used to frame a legal debate that could produce a structured rule.

== Right to trial by jury ==
Section 11(f) provides that

11. Any person charged with an offence has the right ...

(f) except in the case of an offence under military law tried before a military tribunal, to the benefit of trial by jury where the maximum punishment for the offence is imprisonment for five years or a more severe punishment;

The right to a jury is protected by section 11(f). The Supreme Court considered this right in R. v. Pan; R. v. Sawyer (2001), which saw a challenge to the constitutionality of section 649 of the Criminal Code, which prohibited the use of evidence regarding the deliberation of the jury. The Supreme Court found the erosion of the secrecy of the jury would have a negative impact on the ability of a jury to decide a case and would affect an individual's right to jury trial under section 11(f) of the Charter. It is required under the principles of fundamental justice to have an impartial jury.

== Right not to be found guilty unless action constituted an offence ==
Section 11(g) provides that

11. Any person charged with an offence has the right ...

(g) not to be found guilty on account of any act or omission unless, at the time of the act or omission, it constituted an offence under Canadian or international law or was criminal according to the general principles of law recognized by the community of nations;

This prohibits criminal liability from arising from an ex post facto law. In the 1991 case of R. v. Furtney, the Supreme Court explained that this section does not prescribe the details of how the existence of the offence is to be made known, especially given its reference to international law, which inherently defies domestic codification.

== Right not to be tried again ==
Section 11(h) provides that

11. Any person charged with an offence has the right ...

(h) if finally acquitted of the offence, not to be tried for it again and, if finally found guilty and punished for the offence, not to be tried or punished for it again;

This provision prohibits double jeopardy, but only applies after the trial is finally concluded. The Crown has the right to appeal from acquittals. If the appellate court sets aside an acquittal and orders a new trial, that is consistent with this section because the accused has not been "finally acquitted". An appeal of an acquittal will be successful when the Crown can prove that a legal error contributed to the verdict at first instance.

Appeals of factual findings untainted by legal error are not possible. In the case of Corp. Professionnelle des Médecins v. Thibault, the Supreme Court struck down a Quebec provision which allowed appeals courts to conduct a de novo review of both factual and legal findings. Holding that such reviews are new trials disguised as appeals, and that a legally proper acquittal is final for the purposes of section 11(h).

Standards for section 11(h) were set in the Supreme Court case R. v. Wigglesworth (1987). The Court noted that section 11(h) only applies to criminal matters and so both charges must be criminal in nature to invoke the double jeopardy defence. The Court then proposed a two part test to determine whether the first proceeding was in relation to a criminal matters and therefore invoking section 11(h). First, it must be determined whether the matter is of a "public nature, intended to promote public order and welfare within a public sphere of activity". Second, it must be determined whether the matter involves "the imposition of true penal consequences".

The definition of "true penal consequence" has been a matter or regular debate in the Canadian courts, and remains unclear in many contexts. In civil forfeiture proceedings, for example, courts have found that "taking a person’s property away from that person has a punitive component," and various defendants have argued that the rights of the accused in Section 11 of the Charter apply. Courts have generally responded to such arguments by finding that forfeiture contrary to Section 11 is "clearly not in the interests of justice," but have stopped short of applying constitutional remedies per se.

A double jeopardy case came before the Supreme Court in Canada v. Schmidt, in which it was argued extradition to face a state charge of child-stealing would violate section 11(h) since the accused had already been acquitted of the allegedly similar federal kidnapping charge. (Even if these charges could be considered similar, this would not violate the double jeopardy clause in the Fifth Amendment to the United States Constitution, as prosecutions under state and federal laws are considered distinct prosecutions.) Justice La Forest wrote for the majority, "I do not think our constitutional standards can be imposed on other countries." The majority found that the charge would be in accordance with "traditional procedures" in Ohio. Finally, it found that "It is interesting that, as we saw, the United States Supreme Court has repeatedly held that successive prosecutions at the federal and state level do not automatically offend against the due process clause, the spirit and content of which bears some resemblance to s. 7 of the Charter, although the courts would act to prevent oppressive behaviour."

== Right to lesser punishment ==
Section 11(i) provides that

11. Any person charged with an offence has the right ...

(i) if found guilty of the offence and if the punishment for the offence has been varied between the time of commission and the time of sentencing, to the benefit of the lesser punishment.

This right states that if a person committed a crime whose punishment has become lighter or harsher by the time a judge delivers a sentence, the person should receive the lighter punishment. In some cases, the Court of Appeal for Ontario and Alberta Court of Appeal have ruled that section 11(i) only applies to the sentencing given by a trial judge. If the case is appealed and the punishment is made less severe, a person does not have a right to be given the lesser punishment from an appellate judge.
