= 1985 judgments of the Supreme Court of Canada =

Supreme Court of Canada Cour suprême du Canada
- Established: April 8, 1875
- Jurisdiction: General court of appeal for Canada
- Motto: Justitia et Veritas
- Authorized by: Supreme Court Act, RSC 1970, c. S-19
- Appeals from: Provincial and federal courts of appeal
- Judge term length: From appointment until age 75
- Number of positions: Nine
- Language: English and French
- Website: Supreme Court of Canada

The tables below list the judgments delivered by the Supreme Court of Canada during 1985. The judgments are listed in the order of publication in the Supreme Court Reports, starting with the first judgments of the year, rendered on January 31, 1985, and ending with the last judgments, rendered on December 19, 1985. The table gives a general illustration of the positions taken by each justice in each case, and how justices concurred or dissented with the decisions of the majority.

After hearing argument on an an appeal, the court can either reserve judgment, or give judgment from the bench.

In most cases listed in these tables, the court reserved judgment at the conclusion of the hearing, reasons to follow. The court would deliver its decisions on reserved cases at some later date by announcing the judgments in open court. Counsel or their agents were required to return to the court to receive the judgment. The judgment would then be published in the Supreme Court Reports.

If the court instead gave judgment from the bench immediately at the conclusion of the hearing, the judges would give short oral reasons for judgment, which would also be published in the Supreme Court Reports.

Both types of judgments are included in these tables, based on the date that reasons are given. Cases which were argued in 1985 with judgment given in 1985 are included. The tables also include cases which were argued and reserved in a previous year, with the judgment given in 1985. Cases which were heard in 1985 and reserved, with judgment given in a subsequent year, are included in the article for the later year.

In the mid-eighties, the court averaged between 100 to 120 cases per year. However, in 1985, the court only gave 84 judgments, which were reported in two volumes of the Supreme Court Reports.

There was one change in the membership of the court during 1985:

- Gérard La Forest, a judge of the New Brunswick Court of Appeal, was appointed to the Supreme Court on January 16, 1985, succeeding to the position of Justice Ritchie, who had resigned on October 30, 1984.

There was also one development which affected the sittings of the court. In late 1985, Justice Estey was appointed by the federal government to hold a public inquiry into the collapse of two federally chartered banks. The commission hearings took him away from the court hearings in late 1985 and 1986.

== Supreme Court Reports, 1985, volume 1 ==
By the Court (C)
Unanimous reasons for judgment (U)
Concurred in the unanimous reasons (C–U)
Majority reasons for judgment (M)
Concurred in the majority (C–M)
Concurring reasons (C–R)
Concurred in the concurring reasons (C–C)
Plurality reasons (P)
Concurred in the plurality reasons (C–P)
Dissenting reasons (D)
Concurred in the dissent (C–D)
Dissenting in part (D–P)
Concurred in the partial dissent (C–DP)
Seriatim reasons (S)
Concurred in seriatim reasons (C–S)
Motion (Mo)
Did not sit on the appeal (NS)
Did not participate in the judgment (NP)
Not a Justice of the Court at the time of hearing or judgment (NJ)
- "Decision by the Court" means that it is a unanimous judgment of the Court, not attributed to any particular justice.
- "Unanimous reasons for judgment" indicated a unanimous decision, written by a particular justice.
- Multiple concurrences and dissents within a case are numbered, with concurrences by other numbered accordingly. Justices occasionally concur in multiple reasons in a single case; each concurrence is subdivided accordingly.
- Reasons are sometimes drafted jointly by two or more justices.
- Decisions that are given orally from the bench are denoted by "Bench" on the justice who gave the oral decision.

Case	Argued	Decided	Dickson	Beetz	Estey	McIntyre	Chouinard	Lamer	Wilson	Le Dain (Note: Justice Le Dain was appointed May 29, 1984.)	La Forest (Note: Justice La Forest was appointed January 16, 1985.)
Aetna Financial Services v. Feigelman, [1985] 1 SCR 2 (Note: Justice Ritchie sat on the appeal, but retired on October 30, 1984 and did not participate in the decision.)	Sep 26, 1983	Jan 31, 1985	C–U	NS	U	NS	C–U	NS	C–U	NJ	NJ
Brouillard Also Known As Chatel v. The Queen, [1985] 1 SCR 39	Oct 4, 1984	Feb 21, 1985	NS	C–U	NS	C–U	NS	U	NS	C–U	NJ
Scotsburn Co-Op. Services v. W. T. Goodwin Ltd., [1985] 1 SCR 54	Mar 12, 1984	Feb 21, 1985	M	NS	D	C–M	NS	C–D	C–M	NJ	NJ
Rosen v. The Queen, [1985] 1 SCR 83	Jan 24, 1985	Feb 21, 1985	C	C	C	C	C	C	C	NS	NS
King v. Low, [1985] 1 SCR 87	May 23, 1984	Mar 14, 1985	C–U	C–U	NS	U	C–U	C–U	C–U	NJ	NJ
Skoke-Graham v. The Queen, [1985] 1 SCR 106	Jan 26, 1984	Mar 14, 1985	M	C–M	NS	C–M	C–M	C–M (Note: Justice Lamer concurred in both the majority decision and the concurring reasons of Justice Wilson.)	C–R	NJ	NJ
Miriam Home v. C.U.P.E., [1985] 1 SCR 137	Dec 13, 1984	Mar 14, 1985	C–U	C–U	C–U	C–U	U	C–U	NS	C–U	NJ
Janiak v. Ippolito, [1985] 1 SCR 146	Dec 12, 1983	Mar 14, 1985	C–U	NS	C–U	NS	C–U	NS	U	NJ	NJ
Canadian Broadcasting League v. CRTC, [1985] 1 SCR 174	Mar 27, 1985	Mar 27, 1985	Bench; U	C–U	C–U	C–U	C–U	C–U	C–U	NS	NS
Monachan v. The Queen, [1985] 1 SCR 176	Mar 29, 1985	Mar 29, 1985	Bench; U	NS	C–U	C–U	NS	C–U	C–U	C–U	C–U
Case	Argued	Decided	Dickson	Beetz	Estey	McIntyre	Chouinard	Lamer	Wilson	Le Dain	La Forest
Singh v. Minister of Employment and Immigration, [1985] 1 SCR 177	Apr 30, May 1, 1984	Apr 4, 1985	P 1	P 2	C–P; 2	C–P; 2	NS	C–P; 1	C–P; 1	NJ	NJ
Lapierre v. A.G. (Que.), [1985] 1 SCR 241	Nov 19, 20, 1984	Apr 4, 1985	C–U	C–U	C–U	NS	U	C–U	C–U	C–U	NJ
V.K. Mason Construction Ltd. v. Bank of Nova Scotia, [1985] 1 SCR 271	Jun 14, 1984	Apr 4, 1985	C–U	NS	C–U	C–U	NS	C–U	U	NS	NJ
Robitaille v. American Biltrite (Canada), [1985] 1 SCR 290	Mar 27, 28, 1985	Apr 4, 1985	C	C	NS	C	NS	C	C	C	C
Franklin v. The Queen, [1985] 1 SCR 293	Mar 14, 1985	Apr 4, 1985	C	NS	C	NS	C	C	C	C	C
R. v. Big M Drug Mart Ltd., [1985] 1 SCR 295	Mar 6, 7, 1984	Apr 24, 1985	M	C–M	NS	C–M	C–M	C–M	C–R	NJ	NJ
R. v. Horne & Pitfield Foods Ltd., [1985] 1 SCR 364	Mar 8, 1984	Apr 24, 1985	C–U	C–U	NS	U	C–U	C–U	C–U	NJ	NJ
Plantation Indoor Plants Ltd. v. A.G. (Alta.), [1985] 1 SCR 366	Mar 7, 1984	Apr 24, 1985	C–U	C–U	NS	U	C–U	C–U	C–U	NJ	NJ
Montréal v. Arcade Amusements Inc., [1985] 1 SCR 368	Mar 22, 23, 24, 1983	Apr 24, 1985	C–U	U	C–U	C–U	C–U	NS	C–U	NJ	NJ
Jumbo Motors Express Ltd. v. François Nolin Ltée, [1985] 1 SCR 423	Dec 20, 1984	Apr 24, 1985	NS	C–U	NS	NS	U	C–U	C–U	C–U	NJ
Case	Argued	Decided	Dickson	Beetz	Estey	McIntyre	Chouinard	Lamer	Wilson	Le Dain	La Forest
Staranchuk v. The Queen, [1985] 1 SCR 439	May 3, 1985	May 3, 1985	Bench; U	C–U	C–U	C–U	C–U	C–U	C–U	C–U	C–U
Operation Dismantle v. The Queen, [1985] 1 SCR 441	Feb 14, 15, 1984	May 9, 1985	M	NS	C–M	C–M	C–M	C–M	C–R	NJ	NJ
Towne Cinema Theatres Ltd. v. The Queen, [1985] 1 SCR 494	Sep 28, 1983; Nov 23, 1984 (Note: Re-hearing on November 23, 1984; original panel was Justices Ritchie, Dickson, McIntyre, Lamer and Wilson.)	May 9, 1985	P	S	C–S	C–R; 1	NS	C–P	C–R; 2	C–P	NJ
R. v. Tener, [1985] 1 SCR 533	Oct 12 and 13, 1983; Jan 23 and 24, 1985 (Note: Re-hearing on January 23 and 24, 1985; original panel was Justices Ritchie, Dickson, Beetz, Chouinard and Wilson.)	May 9, 1985	C–C	C–M	M	C–M	C–M	NS	C–R	C–M	NS
Head v. Graham, [1985] 1 SCR 566	Apr 29, 1985	May 9, 1985	C–U	NS	U	NS	C–U	NS	C–U	NJ	NJ
Maida v. Dalewood Investments Ltd., [1985] 1 SCR 568	April 29, 30, 1985	May 9, 1985	C	C	NS	C	C	C	NS	C	C
Sansregret v. The Queen, [1985] 1 SCR 570	Oct 11, 1984	May 9, 1985	C–U	NS	C–U	U	C–U	C–U	C–U	C–U	NJ
Dyck v. Manitoba Snowmobile Association, [1985] 1 SCR 589	Mar 28, 29, 1985	May 23, 1985	C	C	C	C	NS	NS	C	C	C
Bell v. The Queen, [1985] 1 SCR 594	Mar 5, 6, 1985	May 23, 1985	C	C	C	C	C	C	C	C	C
Syndicat des professeurs du collège de Lévis-Lauzon v. CEGEP de Lévis-Lauzon, [1985] 1 SCR 596	Oct 31, 1983	May 23, 1985	NS	U	C–U	C–U	C–U	C–U	C–U	NJ	NJ
Case	Argued	Decided	Dickson	Beetz	Estey	McIntyre	Chouinard	Lamer	Wilson	Le Dain	La Forest
R. v. Therens, [1985] 1 SCR 613	Jun 21, 1984	May 23, 1985	C–R; 1	C–P	P	D 1	C–P	C–R; 2	C–P	D 2	NJ
Trask v. The Queen, [1985] 1 SCR 655	Jun 21 1984	May 23, 1985	C	C	C	C	C	C	C	C	NJ
Rahn v. The Queen, [1985] 1 SCR 659	Jun 21, 1984	May 23, 1985	C	C	C	C	C	C	C	C	NJ
Canadian Dredge & Dock Co. v. The Queen, [1985] 1 SCR 662 (Note: Chief Justice Laskin sat on the appeal but died on March 26, 1984 and did not participate in the decision.)	May 24, 25, 26, 1983	May 23, 1985	C–U	C–U	U	C–U	C–U	C–U	C–U	NJ	NJ
Re Manitoba Language Rights, [1985] 1 SCR 721	Jun 11, 12, 13, 1984	Jun 1985	C	C	C	C	NS	C	C	C	NJ
Deloitte Haskins & Sells v. Worker's Comp. Board, [1985] 1 SCR 785	Dec 14, 1983	Jun 13, 1985	C–P; 1	C–P; 1	D	C–P; 2	P 1	C–P; 2	P 2	NJ	NJ
Grdic v. The Queen, [1985] 1 SCR 810	Jan 30, 1984; Jun 5, 1985 (Note: Re-hearing on June 5, 1985; original panel was Justices Ritchie, Beetz, Chouinard, Lamer, and Wilson.)	Jun 13, 1985	C–D	C–D	C–M	C–M	C–D	M	D	C–M	C–M
A.G. (Que.) v. Carrières Ste-Thérèse Ltée, [1985] 1 SCR 831	Mar 8, 1985	Jun 13, 1985	C	C	C	C	NS	C	C	NS	C
Telecommunication Workers Union v. B.C. Telephone, [1985] 1 SCR 840	May 1, 1985	Jun 13, 1985	C–U	C–U	NS	C–U	C–U	NS	C–U	C–U	U
Courville v. The Queen, [1985] 1 SCR 847	May 21, 22, 1985	Jun 13, 1985	C	C	C	C	C	NS	C	C	NS
Case	Argued	Decided	Dickson	Beetz	Estey	McIntyre	Chouinard	Lamer	Wilson	Le Dain	La Forest
Blais v. M.N.R., [1985] 1 SCR 849	May 24, 1985	Jun 13, 1985	C	NS	C	C	C	C	C	C	NS
Lamb v. Lamb, [1985] 1 SCR 851	Jun 7, 1985	Jun 27, 1985	C	C	C	C	C	NS	C	NS	C
Air Canada v. City of Dorval, [1985] 1 SCR 861	Feb 13, 14, 1985	Jun 27, 1985	NS	C	C	NS	C	C	C	C	C

== Supreme Court Reports, 1985, volume 2 ==
By the Court (C)
Unanimous reasons for judgment (U)
Concurred in the unanimous reasons (C–U)
Majority reasons for judgment (M)
Concurred in the majority (C–M)
Concurring reasons (C–R)
Concurred in the concurring reasons (C–C)
Plurality reasons (P)
Concurred in the plurality reasons (C–P)
Dissenting reasons (D)
Concurred in the dissent (C–D)
Dissenting in part (D–P)
Concurred in the partial dissent (C–DP)
Seriatim reasons (S)
Concurred in seriatim reasons (C–S)
Motion (Mo)
Did not sit on the appeal (NS)
Did not participate in the judgment (NP)
Not a Justice of the Court at the time of hearing or judgment (NJ)
- "Decision by the Court" means that it is a unanimous judgment of the Court, not attributed to any particular justice.
- "Unanimous reasons for judgment" indicated a unanimous decision, written by a particular justice.
- Multiple concurrences and dissents within a case are numbered, with concurrences by other numbered accordingly. Justices occasionally concur in multiple reasons in a single case; each concurrence is subdivided accordingly.
- Reasons are sometimes drafted jointly by two or more justices.
- Decisions that are given orally from the bench are denoted by "Bench" on the justice who gave the oral decision.

Case	Argued	Decided	Dickson	Beetz	Estey	McIntyre	Chouinard	Lamer	Wilson	Le Dain (Note: Justice Le Dain was appointed May 29, 1984.)	La Forest (Note: Justice La Forest was appointed January 16, 1985.)
Dedman v. The Queen, [1985] 2 SCR 2	Oct 9, 1984	Jul 31, 1985	D	C–D	NS	C–M	C–D	C–M	C–M	M	NJ
Rousseau v. The Queen, [1985] 2 SCR 38	Dec 11, 1984	Jul 31, 1985	C–U	C–U	NS	C–U	C–U	U	C–U	C–U	NJ
Johns-Manville Canada v. The Queen, [1985] 2 SCR 46 (Note: Justice Ritchie sat on the appeal, but retired on October 30, 1984 and did not participate in the decision.)	May 15, 16, 1984	Jul 31, 1985	C–U	C–U	U	C–U	C–U	NS	C–U	NJ	NJ
Fraternité des Policiers (C.U.M.) v. C.U.M., [1985] 2 SCR 74	Mar 7, 1985	Jul 31, 1985	NS	C–U	NS	C–U	U	C–U	C–U	C–U	C–U
Donkin v. Bugoy, [1985] 2 SCR 85	Nov 29, 1983; Jun 27, 1985 (Note: Re-hearing on June 27, 1985; original panel was Justices Ritchie, Dickson, Estey, McIntyre and Wilson.)	Sep 19, 1985	C–M	C–M	M	D	C–M	C–D	C–D	C–M	C–M
The Queen v. Toews, [1985] 2 SCR 119	Oct 30, 1984	Sep 19, 1985	C–U	C–U	NS	U	C–U	C–U	C–U	C–U	NJ
R. v. Jewitt, [1985] 2 SCR 128	Oct 31, 1984	Sep 19, 1985	U	C–U	NS	C–U	C–U	C–U	C–U	C–U	NJ
Winnipeg School Division No. 1 v. Craton, [1985] 2 SCR 150	May 15, 1985	Sep 19, 1985	C–U	C–U	C–U	U	C–U	C–U	C–U	C–U	C–U
R. v. L'Heureux, [1985] 2 SCR 159	May 23, 1985	Sep 19, 1985	C–U	C–U	C–U	C–U	C–U	U	NS	C–U	NS
Oakwood Development Ltd. v. St.François Xavier, [1985] 2 SCR 164	Nov 16, 1984	Sep 19, 1985	NS	NS	NS	C–U	C–U	C–U	U	C–U	NJ
Case	Argued	Decided	Dickson	Beetz	Estey	McIntyre	Chouinard	Lamer	Wilson	Le Dain	La Forest
Libman v. The Queen, [1985] 2 SCR 178	Feb 2, 1985	Oct 10, 1985	C–U	NS	NS	C–U	C–U	C–U	C–U	C–U	U
Cluett v. The Queen, [1985] 2 SCR 216	Nov 22, 1984	Oct 10, 1985	C–U	C–U	C–U	C–U	C–U	C–U	NS	U	NJ
Fanjoy v. The Queen, [1985] 2 SCR 233	Jan 25, 1985	Oct 10, 1985	C–U	C–U	C–U	U	C–U	C–U	NS	C–U	NJ
Germain v. The Queen, [1985] 2 SCR 241 (Note: Justices La Forest and Le Dain both concurred in the decision of Justice Chouinard, making it the majority judgment. La Forest also wrote his own concurring reasons, to which Le Dain concurred.)	Mar 7, 1985	Oct 10, 1985	C–R; 1 Joint	C–M	C–M	C–M	M	C–R; 1 Joint	C–R; 2	C–C; 3	C–R; 3
Krug v. The Queen, [1985] 2 SCR 255	Mar 13, 1985	Oct 10, 1985	C–U	NS	C–U	C–U	C–U	C–U	C–U	NS	U
Brown and Murphy v. The Queen, [1985] 2 SCR 273	Feb 15, 1985	Oct 10, 1985	C–U	C–U	C–U	U	NS	NS	C–U	C–U	C–U
Spencer v. The Queen, [1985] 2 SCR 278	Mar 26, 1985	Oct 10, 1985	C–M	C–M	C–R	C–M	C–M	C–M	C–M	C–M	M
Austin v. The Queen, [1985] 2 SCR 285	Oct 10, 1985	Oct 10, 1985	Bench; U	NS	NS	C–U	C–U	C–U	C–U	C–U	C–U
Bruce v. The Queen, [1985] 2 SCR 287	Oct 29, 1985	Oct 20, 1985	Bench; U	C–U	NS	NS	C–U	C–U	C–U	C–U	C–U
The Queen v. Imperial General Properties Ltd., [1985] 2 SCR 288	Apr 30, 1985	Oct 31, 1985	NS	C–M	M	C–D	C–M	C–D	D	NS	C–M
Case	Argued	Decided	Dickson	Beetz	Estey	McIntyre	Chouinard	Lamer	Wilson	Le Dain	La Forest
Dick v. The Queen, [1985] 2 SCR 309	Oct 29, 1984	Oct 31, 1985	C–U	U	C–U	C–U	C–U	NS	NS	NS	NJ
Jack and Charlie v. The Queen, [1985] 2 SCR 332	Oct 29, 30, 1984	Oct 31, 1985	C–U	U	C–U	C–U	C–U	NS	NS	NS	NJ
Order: Manitoba Language Rights, [1985] 2 SCR 347	Nov 4, 1985	Nov 4, 1985	Bench; C	C	NS	C	NS	NS	C	C	NS
Dubois v. The Queen, [1985] 2 SCR 350	Oct 25, 1984	Nov 21, 1985	C–M	NS	C–M	D	C–M	M	C–M	C–M	NJ
Simon v. The Queen, [1985] 2 SCR 387	Oct 23, 1984	Nov 21, 1985	U	C–U	C–U	C–U	C–U	NS	C–U	C–U	NJ
Vachon v. Canada Employment and Immigration Commission, [1985] 2 SCR 417	Dec 14, 1984	Nov 21, 1985	C–U	U	C–U	C–U	C–U	C–U	C–U	NS	NJ
Grabowski v. The Queen, [1985] 2 SCR 434	May 22, 1985	Nov 21, 1985	C–U	C–U	NS	C–U	U	C–U	C–U	C–U	NS
Fraser v. Public Service Staff Relations Board, [1985] 2 SCR 455	Feb 14, 1985	Dec 10, 1985	U	C–U	C–U	C–U	C–U	C–U	C–U	C–U	C–U
John v. The Queen, [1985] 2 SCR 476	Mar 6, 1985	Dec 10, 1985	C–U	C–U	U Joint	C–U	C–U	U Joint	NS	C–U	NS
Terlecki v. The Queen, [1985] 2 SCR 483	Dec 12, 1985	Dec 12, 1985	Bench; U	C–U	NS	C–U	C–U	C–U	C–U	NS	C–U
Case	Argued	Decided	Dickson	Beetz	Estey	McIntyre	Chouinard	Lamer	Wilson	Le Dain	La Forest
Bouvier v. The Queen, [1985] 2 SCR 485	Dec 13, 1985	Dec 13, 1985	Bench; U	C–U	NS	NS	C–U	C–U	C–U	C–U	C–U
Reference Re BC Motor Vehicle Act, [1985] 2 SCR 486	Nov 15, 1984	Dec 17, 1985	C–M	C–M	NS	C–R; 1	C–M	M	C–R; 2	C–M	NJ
Ont. Human Rights Comm. v. Simpsons-Sears, [1985] 2 SCR 536	Jan 29, 1985	Dec 17, 1985	C–U	C–U	C–U	U	C–U	C–U	C–U	NS	NS
Bhinder v. CN, [1985] 2 SCR 561	Jan 30, 1985	Dec 17, 1985	D	C–C	C–P	P	C–P	C–D	C–R	NS	NS
Schuldt v. The Queen, [1985] 2 SCR 592	Feb 20, 1985	Dec 17, 1985	C–U	C–U	C–U	C–U	C–U	U	C–U	NS	NS
Duane v. The Queen, [1985] 2 SCR 612	Dec 18, 1985	Dec 18, 1985	Bench; U	C–U	NS	C–U	C–U	C–U	C–U	C–U	NJ
R. v. Miller, [1985] 2 SCR 613	Oct 12, 1984	Dec 19, 1985	C–U	C–U	C–U	C–U	NS	C–U	C–U	U	NJ
Cardinal v. Director of Kent Institution, [1985] 2 SCR 643	Oct 11, 12, 1984	Dec 19, 1985	C–U	C–U	C–U	C–U	NS	C–U	C–U	U	NJ
Morin v. Shu Review Committee, [1985] 2 SCR 662	Oct 12, 1984	Dec 19, 1985	C–U	C–U	C–U	C–U	NS	C–U	C–U	U	NJ
Valente v. The Queen, [1985] 2 SCR 673	Oct 9, 10, 1984	Dec 19, 1985	C–U	C–U	C–U	C–U	C–U	C–U	NS	U	NJ
Morier and Boily v. Rivard, [1985] 2 SCR 716	May 21, 1985	Dec 19, 1985	C–M	C–M	C–M	C–M	M	C–M	C–D	C–M	D
Case	Argued	Decided	Dickson	Beetz	Estey	McIntyre	Chouinard	Lamer	Wilson	Le Dain	La Forest

== Summaries ==
Summary of Judgments 1985
Type	Number
By the Court	15
Unanimous	50
Majority with concurrences	7
Majority with dissents	7
Plurality	5
Total	84

Summary of Each Justice's Positions 1985
Decision Type	Dickson	Beetz	Estey	McIntyre	Chouinard	Lamer	Wilson	Le Dain	La Forest
Court	11	13	12	13	10	11	14	12	8
Unanimous	14	5	4	9	5	5	3	5	3
Unanimous (concurring)	34	35	28	34	38	35	38	26	10
Majority	4	0	3	0	2	3	0	1	1
Majority (concurring)	5	9	6	10	9	6	4	7	3
Concurring reasons	2	0	1	2	0	2	8	0	1
Concurred in concurrence	1	1	0	0	0	0	0	1	0
Plurality	2	1	0	0	1	0	1	0	0
Plurality (concurrence)	1	2	2	3	2	3	2	1	0
Seriatim	0	1	0	0	0	0	0	0	0
Seriatim (concurrence)	0	0	1	0	0	0	0	0	0
Dissent	2	0	2	3	0	0	2	1	1
Dissent (concurrence)	1	2	0	1	2	4	2	0	0
Dissenting in part	0	0	0	0	0	0	0	0	0
Dissenting in part (concurrence)	0	0	0	0	0	0	0	0	0
Not Sitting	7	15	25	9	15	15	10	14	13
Not a Justice	0	0	0	0	0	0	0	16	44

Judgments issued, 1976 to 1985
Year	Judgments	Chief Justice
1985	84	Dickson
1984	63	Dickson
1983	90	Laskin
1982	118	Laskin
1981	112	Laskin
1980	112	Laskin
1979	137	Laskin
1978	116	Laskin
1977	125	Laskin
1976	109	Laskin
Ten-Year Average		107
Source: Supreme Court Judgments, 1976 to 1985
