= 1990 judgments of the Supreme Court of Canada =

Supreme Court of Canada Cour suprême du Canada
- Established: April 8, 1875
- Jurisdiction: General court of appeal for Canada
- Motto: Justitia et Veritas
- Authorized by: Supreme Court Act, RSC 1985, c. S-26
- Appeals from: Provincial and federal courts of appeal
- Judge term length: Retirement at age 75
- Number of positions: Nine
- Language: English and French
- Website: Supreme Court of Canada

The tables below list the judgments delivered by the Supreme Court of Canada during 1990. The judgments are listed in the order of publication in the Supreme Court Reports, starting with the first judgments of the year, rendered on January 18, 1990, and ending with the last judgments, rendered on December 20, 1990. The tables give a general illustration of the positions taken by each justice in each case, and how justices concurred or dissented with the decisions of the majority.

The Supreme Court normally reserves its judgment after hearing argument on an appeal, and then gives its judgment at some later date. At the time of these judgments, the court would deliver its reserved decisions at a session in open court. In some cases, the court instead gave its judgment from the bench at the conclusion of the hearing, with a short outline of its reasons. Those judgments are included in the table. The court also could give its decision on an appeal from the bench at the conclusion of the hearing, reasons to follow at a later date.

This table includes cases which were argued in a previous year and reserved, with the judgment given in 1990. Cases which were heard in 1990 and reserved, with judgment in a later year, are included in the article for the later year.

The Court gave 140 judgments in 1990, reported in three volumes of the Supreme Court Reports.

There were three changes in the membership of the court in 1990:

- Chief Justice Dickson retired on June 29, 1990, after seventeen years on the court (eleven as puisne justice and six as chief justice of Canada).
- Justice Antonio Lamer, puisne justice since March 28, 1980, was appointed chief justice of Canada on July 1, 1990, succeeding Chief Justice Dickson.
- William Stevenson, a judge of the Alberta Court of Appeal, was appointed puisne justice of the court on September 17, 1990, succeeding Lamer in that position.

The Supreme Court Act authorises a retired judge to participate in reserved appeals they have heard prior to their retirement, for up to six months. Dickson participated in decisions of cases he had heard before his retirement, until December 1990.

== Judgments ==
=== Supreme Court Reports 1990: volume 1 ===
By the Court (C)
Unanimous reasons for judgment (U)
Concurred in the unanimous reasons (C–U)
Majority reasons for judgment (M)
Concurred in the majority (C–M)
Concurring reasons (C–R)
Concurred in the concurring reasons (C–C)
Plurality reasons (P)
Concurred in the plurality reasons (C–P)
Dissenting reasons (D)
Concurred in the dissent (C–D)
Dissenting in part (D–P)
Concurred in the partial dissent (C–DP)
Seriatim reasons (S)
Concurred in seriatim reasons (C–S)
Motion (Mo)
Did not sit on the appeal (NS)
Did not participate in the judgment (NP)
Not a Justice of the Court at the time of hearing or judgment (NJ)
- "Decision by the Court" means that it is a unanimous judgment of the Court, not attributed to any particular justice.
- "Unanimous reasons for judgment" indicated a unanimous decision, written by a particular justice.
- Multiple concurrences and dissents within a case are numbered, with concurrences by other numbered accordingly. Justices occasionally concur in multiple reasons in a single case; each concurrence is subdivided accordingly.
- Reasons are sometimes drafted jointly by two or more justices.
- Decisions that are given orally from the bench are denoted by "Bench" on the justice who gave the oral decision.

Case	Argued	Decided	Dickson (Note: Chief Justice Dickson retired June 29, 1990.)	Lamer	Wilson	La Forest	L'Heureux-Dubé	Sopinka	Gonthier	Cory	McLachlin
R. v. Shubley, [1990] 1 SCR 3	Oct 6, 1989	Jan 18, 1990	NS	NS	C–D	NS	NS	C–M	C–M	D	M
R. v. Duarte, [1990] 1 SCR 30	Oct 4, 5, 1989	Jan 25, 1990	C–M	C–R	NS	M	C–M	C–M	C–M	NS	C–M
R. v. Wiggins, [1990] 1 SCR 62	Oct 5, 1989	Jan 25, 1990	C–M	C–R	NS	M	C–M	C–M	C–M	NS	C–M
Rawluk v. Rawluk, [1990] 1 SCR 70	Oct 6, 1989	Jan 25, 1990	C–M	NS	C–M	C–D	C–M	C–D	NS	M	D
R. v. Delafosse, [1990] 1 SCR 114	Jan 25, 1990	Jan 25, 1990	NS	Bench; U	NS	NS	C–U	C–U	C–U	NS	C–U
R. v. D'Amours, [1990] 1 SCR 115	Jan 25, 1990	Jan 25, 1990	NS	Bench; U	C–U	NS	C–U	C–U	C–U	C–U	C–U
Oregon Jack Creek Indian Band v. Canadian National Railway Co. (Motion), [1990] 1 SCR 117	Jan 25, 1990	Jan 25, 1990	C	NS	C	C	C	C	NS	C	C
R. v. Hicks, [1990] 1 SCR 120	Jan 31, 1990	Jan 31, 1990	NS	Bench; U	C–U	C–U	C–U	C–U	C–U	NS	C–U
Bank of Montreal v. Hall, [1990] 1 SCR 121	Feb 28, 1989	Feb 1, 1990	NS	NS	C–U	U	C–U	C–U	NS	C–U	NS
Cloutier v. Langlois, [1990] 1 SCR 158	Nov 1, 1989	Feb 1, 1990	NS	C–U	NS	C–U	U	C–U	C–U	C–U	C–U
Case	Argued	Decided	Dickson	Lamer	Wilson	La Forest	L'Heureux-Dubé	Sopinka	Gonthier	Cory	McLachlin
R. v. Brydges, [1990] 1 SCR 190	Nov 10, 1989	Feb 1, 1990	NS	M	C–M	C–R	C–C	NS	C–M	C–M	C–C
Reekie v. Messervey (Motion), [1990] 1 SCR 219	Jan 17, 1990	Feb 8, 1990	NS	NS	NS	NS	NS	Mo	NS	NS	NS
R. v. Van Rassel, [1990] 1 SCR 225	Nov 1, 1989	Feb 15, 1990	NS	C–U	NS	C–U	C–U	C–U	C–U	C–U	U
R. v. Storrey, [1990] 1 SCR 241	Nov 3, 1989	Feb 15, 1990	NS	C–U	C–U	C–U	NS	C–U	C–U	U	C–U
Quebec (Attorney General) v. Brunet; Quebec (Attorney General) v. Albert; Quebec (Attorney General) v. Collier, [1990] 1 SCR 260	Feb 28, 1990	Feb 28, 1990	Bench; U	Bench; U	C–U	C–U	C–U	C–U	C–U	C–U	C–U
R. v. Brown, [1990] 1 SCR 264	Feb 28, 1990	Feb 28, 1990	Bench; U	C–U	NS	C–U	NS	C–U	NS	C–U	NS
R. v. Anderson, [1990] 1 SCR 265	Jun 13, 1989	Mar 1, 1990	C–U	C–U	C–U	C–U	NS	U	C–U	C–U	NS
Kerrybrooke Development Ltd. v. Ellis‑Don Ltd., [1990] 1 SCR 275	Mar 1, 1990	Mar 1, 1990	NS	Bench; U	C–U	Bench; U	NS	C–U	C–U	C–U	C–U
R. v. Selhi, [1990] 1 SCR 277	Mar 2, 1990	Mar 2, 1990	Bench; U	C–U	NS	C–U	NS	C–U	C–U	C–U	C–U
Dumont v. Canada (Attorney General), [1990] 1 SCR 279	Mar 2, 1990	Mar 2, 1990	Bench; U	NS	Bench; U	C–U	NS	C–U	C–U	C–U	C–U
Case	Argued	Decided	Dickson	Lamer	Wilson	La Forest	L'Heureux-Dubé	Sopinka	Gonthier	Cory	McLachlin
IWA v. Consolidated‑Bathurst Packaging Ltd., [1990] 1 SCR 282	Apr 26, 1989	Mar 15, 1990	NS	C–D	C–M	C–M	C–M	D	M	NS	C–M
Mahe v. Alberta, [1990] 1 SCR 342	Jun 14, 1989	Mar 15, 1990	U	NS	C–U	C–U	C–U	C–U	C–U	C–U	NS
R. v. Schmautz, [1990] 1 SCR 398	Nov 9, 1989	Mar 15, 1990	C–M	C–R	NS	C–M	NS	C–M	M	C–M	C–M
Thomson Newspapers Ltd. v. Canada (Director of Investigation and Research, Restrictive Trade Practices Commission), [1990] 1 SCR 425	Nov 1, 1988	Mar 29, 1990	NS	D–P; 1	D	S 1	S 2	D–P; 2	NJ	NJ	NJ
Stelco Inc. v. (Attorney General), [1990] 1 SCR 617	Nov 1, 2, 1988	Mar 29, 1990	NS	S 1	D 1	S 2	S 3	D 2	NJ	NJ	NJ
R. v. McKinlay Transport Ltd., [1990] 1 SCR 627	Nov 2, 1988	Mar 29, 1990	NS	C–P	P	S 1	S 2	S 3	NJ	NJ	NJ
Knight v. Indian Head School Division No. 19, [1990] 1 SCR 653	Nov 28, 29, 1989	Mar 29, 1990	C–M	NS	C–C	C–M	M	C–R	NS	C–M	C–C
Rudolph Wolff & Co. v. Canada, [1990] 1 SCR 695	Jan 24, 1990	Mar 29, 1990	C–U	NS	C–U	NS	C–U	C–U	C–U	U	C–U
Dywidag Systems International, Canada Ltd. v. Zutphen Brothers Construction Ltd., [1990] 1 SCR 705	Jan 24, 1990	Mar 29, 1990	C–U	NS	C–U	NS	C–U	C–U	C–U	U	C–U
R. v. Thomas (Motion), [1990] 1 SCR 713	Mar 19, 1990	Apr 5, 1990	NS	NS	Mo; Joint	NS	NS	Mo; Joint	NS	NS	Mo; Joint
Case	Argued	Decided	Dickson	Lamer	Wilson	La Forest	L'Heureux-Dubé	Sopinka	Gonthier	Cory	McLachlin
R. v. B. (C.R.), [1990] 1 SCR 717	Oct 30, 1989	Apr 12, 1990	C–M	C–D	C–M	NS	C–M	D	C–M	NS	M
R. v. Greffe, [1990] 1 SCR 755	Nov 27, 28, 1989	Apr 12, 1990	D	M	C–M	C–M	C–D	NS	C–M	C–D	NS
Nichols v. American Home Assurance Co., [1990] 1 SCR 801	Jan 29, 1990	Apr 12, 1990	C–U	NS	C–U	C–U	C–U	NS	C–U	C–U	U
C.C.R. Fishing Ltd. v. British Reserve Insurance Co., [1990] 1 SCR 814	Feb 21, 1990	Apr 12, 1990	C–U	NS	C–U	C–U	C–U	C–U	NS	C–U	U
R. v. Wallen, [1990] 1 SCR 827	Feb 23, 1990	Apr 12, 1990	NS	P	NS	C–R	C–D	NS	NS	C–P	D
R. v. Bolianatz, [1990] 1 SCR 847	Apr 24, 1990	Apr 24, 1990	NS	Bench; U	NS	NS	C–U	Bench; U	NS	C–U	C–U
R. v. Suren, [1990] 1 SCR 849	Apr 25, 1990	Apr 25, 1990	NS	NS	NS	Bench; U	C–U	NS	C–U	Bench; U	C–U
Quebec (Attorney General) v. Publications Photo‑Police Inc., [1990] 1 SCR 851	Apr 27, 1990	Apr 27, 1990	NS	Bench; U	C–U	C–U	NS	C–U	C–U	C–U	C–U
R. v. Lavallee, [1990] 1 SCR 852	Oct 31, 1989	May 3, 1990	C–M	C–M	M	NS	C–M	C–R	C–M	NS	C–M
R. v. Horseman, [1990] 1 SCR 901	Nov 27, 1989	May 3, 1990	C–D	C–M	D	C–M	C–D	NS	C–M	M	NS
Case	Argued	Decided	Dickson	Lamer	Wilson	La Forest	L'Heureux-Dubé	Sopinka	Gonthier	Cory	McLachlin
Ratych v. Bloomer, [1990] 1 SCR 940	Jan 30, 1990	May 3, 1990	C–D	C–M	C–D	C–M	C–M	C–M	C–D	D	M
Robitaille v. Madill, [1990] 1 SCR 985	Mar 20, 1990	May 3, 1990	NS	NS	NS	C	C	NS	C	C	C
R. v. Smith, [1990] 1 SCR 991	May 4, 1990	May 4, 1990	NS	NS	U	C–U	C–U	NS	C–U	C–U	NS
R. v. A, [1990] 1 SCR 992	May 17, 1990	May 17, 1990	C	C	C	C	C	C	C	C	C
R. v. A, [1990] 1 SCR 995	Feb 2, 1990	Feb 15, 1990	C–M	C–D	C–M	C–M	C–M	C–R	C–M	M	D
R. v. Fitzgibbon, [1990] 1 SCR 1005	Jan 23, 1990	May 17, 1990	C–U	C–U	NS	NS	C–U	C–U	C–U	U	C–U
R. v. Saunders, [1990] 1 SCR 1020	Mar 21, 1990	Mar 21, 1990; May 17, 1990 (Note: Judgment from the bench, March 21, 1990; reasons delivered May 17, 1990.)	NS	C–U	C–U	NS	C–U	C–U	C–U	C–U	U
R. v. Sioui, [1990] 1 SCR 1025	Oct 31, Nov 1, 1989	May 24, 1990	C–U	U	C–U	C–U	C–U	C–U	C–U	C–U	C–U
R. v. Sparrow, [1990] 1 SCR 1075 (Note: Justice McIntyre sat on the hearing, but resigned on February 15, 1989, and did not participate in the decision of any case rendered more than six months after that date.)	Nov 3, 1988	May 31, 1990	U Joint	C–U	C–U	U Joint	C–U	C–U	NJ	NJ	NJ
Reference re ss. 193 and 195.1(1)(c) of the Criminal Code (Man.), [1990] 1 SCR 1123	Dec 1, 2, 1988	May 31, 1990	P	C–R	D	C–P	C–D	C–P	NJ	NJ	NJ
Case	Argued	Decided	Dickson	Lamer	Wilson	La Forest	L'Heureux-Dubé	Sopinka	Gonthier	Cory	McLachlin
R. v. Stagnitta, [1990] 1 SCR 1226	Dec 1, 2, 1988	May 31, 1990	P	C–R	D	C–P	C–D	C–P	NJ	NJ	NJ
R. v. Skinner, [1990] 1 SCR 1235	Dec 1, 2, 1988	May 31, 1990	P	C–R	D	C–P	C–D	C–P	NJ	NJ	NJ
R. v. Ladouceur, [1990] 1 SCR 1257	Nov 6, 1989	May 31, 1990	C–C	C–M	C–C	C–C	C–M	C–R	C–M	M	C–M
R. v. Wilson, [1990] 1 SCR 1291	Nov 6, 1989	May 31, 1990	C–C	C–M	C–C	C–C	C–M	C–R	C–M	M	C–M
Gendron v. Supply and Services Union of the Public Service Alliance of Canada, Local 50057, [1990] 1 SCR 1298	Jan 26, 1990	May 31, 1990	NS	C–U	C–U	NS	U	C–U	C–U	C–U	C–U
Centre hospitalier Régina Ltée v. Labour Court, [1990] 1 SCR 1330	Jan 26, 1990	May 31, 1990	NS	C–U	C–U	NS	U	C–U	C–U	C–U	C–U
Starr v. Houlden, [1990] 1 SCR 1366	Mar 8, 1990	Apr 5, 1990	C–M	M	NS	C–M	D	C–M	C–M	C–M	NS
Case	Argued	Decided	Dickson	Lamer	Wilson	La Forest	L'Heureux-Dubé	Sopinka	Gonthier	Cory	McLachlin

=== Supreme Court Reports 1990: volume 2 ===
By the Court (C)
Unanimous reasons for judgment (U)
Concurred in the unanimous reasons (C–U)
Majority reasons for judgment (M)
Concurred in the majority (C–M)
Concurring reasons (C–R)
Concurred in the concurring reasons (C–C)
Plurality reasons (P)
Concurred in the plurality reasons (C–P)
Dissenting reasons (D)
Concurred in the dissent (C–D)
Dissenting in part (D–P)
Concurred in the partial dissent (C–DP)
Seriatim reasons (S)
Concurred in seriatim reasons (C–S)
Motion (Mo)
Did not sit on the appeal (NS)
Did not participate in the judgment (NP)
Not a Justice of the Court at the time of hearing or judgment (NJ)
- "Decision by the Court" means that it is a unanimous judgment of the Court, not attributed to any particular justice.
- "Unanimous reasons for judgment" indicated a unanimous decision, written by a particular justice.
- Multiple concurrences and dissents within a case are numbered, with concurrences by other numbered accordingly. Justices occasionally concur in multiple reasons in a single case; each concurrence is subdivided accordingly.
- Reasons are sometimes drafted jointly by two or more justices.
- Decisions that are given orally from the bench are denoted by "Bench" on the justice who gave the oral decision.

Case	Argued	Decided	Dickson (Note: Chief Justice Dickson retired June 29, 1990.)	Lamer	Wilson	La Forest	L'Heureux-Dubé	Sopinka	Gonthier	Cory	McLachlin
R. v. B. (G.), [1990] 2 SCR 3	Nov 29, 1989	Jun 7, 1990	NS	NS	U	NS	C–U	NS	C–U	C–U	C–U
R. v. B. (G.), [1990] 2 SCR 30	Nov 29, 1989	Jun 7, 1990	NS	NS	U	NS	C–U	NS	C–U	C–U	C–U
R. v. B. (G.), [1990] 2 SCR 57	Nov 29, 1989	Jun 7, 1990	NS	NS	M	NS	C–M	NS	C–C	C–M	C–R
R. v. Ostrowski, [1990] 2 SCR 82	Jun 20, 1990	Jun 20, 1990	NS	NS	NS	Bench; U	C–U	NS	C–U	Bench; U	C–U
Mitchell v. Peguis Indian Band, [1990] 2 SCR 85	Feb 24, 1989	Jun 21, 1990	S	C–P; 2	P 2	P 1	C–P; 2	C–P; 1	C–P; 1	NS	NJ
R. v. Hebert, [1990] 2 SCR 151	Nov 8, 1989	Jun 21, 1990	C–M	C–M	C–R; 1	C–M	C–M	C–R; 2	C–M	C–M	M
Apple Computer, Inc. v. Mackintosh Computers Ltd.; Apple Computer, Inc. v. 115778 Canada Inc., [1990] 2 SCR 209	Feb 26, 1990	Jun 21, 1990	C–U	C–U	C–U	C–U	C–U	C–U	C–U	U	C–U
Bhatnager v. Canada (Minister of Employment and Immigration), [1990] 2 SCR 217	Mar 19, 1990	Jun 21, 1990	C–U	C–U	C–U	C–U	C–U	U	C–U	C–U	C–U
Rocket v. Royal College of Dental Surgeons of Ontario, [1990] 2 SCR 232	Mar 22, 1990	Jun 21, 1990	C–U	C–U	C–U	C–U	NS	C–U	C–U	NS	U
R. v. S. (S.), [1990] 2 SCR 254	Mar 23, 1989	Jun 28, 1990	U	C–U	C–U	C–U	NS	C–U	C–U	C–U	NJ
Case	Argued	Decided	Dickson	Lamer	Wilson	La Forest	L'Heureux-Dubé	Sopinka	Gonthier	Cory	McLachlin
R. v. S. (G.), [1990] 2 SCR 294	Mar 23, 1989	Jun 28, 1990	U	C–U	C–U	C–U	NS	C–U	C–U	C–U	NJ
R. v. P. (J.), [1990] 2 SCR 300	Mar 23, 1989	Jun 28, 1990	U	C–U	C–U	C–U	NS	C–U	C–U	C–U	NJ
R. v. T. (A.), [1990] 2 SCR 304	Mar 23, 1989	Jun 28, 1990	U	C–U	C–U	C–U	NS	C–U	C–U	C–U	NJ
R. v. B. (J.), [1990] 2 SCR 307	Mar 23, 1989	Jun 28, 1990	U	C–U	C–U	C–U	NS	C–U	C–U	C–U	NJ
Snell v. Farrell, [1990] 2 SCR 311 (Note: Chief Justice Dickson resigned on June 29, 1989. As permitted by the Supreme Court Act, he continued to participate in judgments on appeals he heard before his resignation, for up to six months.)	Dec 6, 1989	Aug 16, 1990	C–U	NS	C–U	C–U	C–U	U	NS	C–U	C–U
Knox Contracting Ltd. v. Canada, [1990] 2 SCR 338	Dec 7, 1989	Aug 16, 1990	NS	NS	C–M	C–R	C–D	D	C–M	M	C–D
Professional Institute of the Public Service of Canada v. Northwest Territories (Commissioner), [1990] 2 SCR 367	Feb 20, 1990	Aug 16, 1990	S	NS	C–D	C–R; 1	C–R; 2	P	C–D	D	NS
National Trust Co. v. Mead, [1990] 2 SCR 410	Feb 23, 1990	Aug 16, 1990	NS	C–M	M	C–M	C–M	NS	C–M	C–M	C–R
Rocois Construction Inc. v. Québec Ready Mix Inc., [1990] 2 SCR 440	Mar 21, 1990	Aug 16, 1990	NS	C–U	NS	NS	C–U	NS	U	C–U	C–U
Bishop v. Stevens, [1990] 2 SCR 467	Mar 30, 1990	Aug 16, 1990	NS	C–U	NS	C–U	C–U	NS	C–U	NS	U
Case	Argued	Decided	Dickson	Lamer	Wilson	La Forest	L'Heureux-Dubé	Sopinka	Gonthier	Cory	McLachlin
Central Alberta Dairy Pool v. Alberta (Human Rights Commission), [1990] 2 SCR 489	Oct 13, 1989	Sep 13, 1990	C–M	NS	M	C–C	C–M	C–R	NS	C–M	C–C
R. v. Khan, [1990] 2 SCR 531	Nov 3, 1989	Sep 13, 1990	NS	C–U	C–U	NS	NS	C–U	C–U	NS	U
Canadian Indemnity Co. v. Canadian Johns‑Manville Co., [1990] 2 SCR 549	Dec 7, 1989	Sep 13, 1990	NS	NS	NS	C–U	C–U	C–U	U	C–U	NS
R. v. Multiform Manufacturing Co., [1990] 2 SCR 624	May 25, 1990	Sep 13, 1990	NS	U	NS	C–U	C–U	C–U	C–U	C–U	C–U
R. v. Martineau, [1990] 2 SCR 633	Mar 26, 1990	Sep 13, 1990	C–M	M	C–M	NS	D	C–R	C–M	C–M	NS
R. v. Rodney, [1990] 2 SCR 687	Mar 26, 1990	Sep 13, 1990	C–M	M	C–M	NS	D	C–R	C–M	C–M	NS
R. v. Arkell, [1990] 2 SCR 695	Mar 26, 1990	Sep 13, 1990	C–M	M	C–M	NS	C–R; 1	C–R; 2	C–M	C–M	NS
R. v. Luxton, [1990] 2 SCR 711	Mar 26, 27, 1990	Sep 13, 1990	C–M	M	C–M	NS	D	C–R	C–M	C–M	NS
R. v. Logan, [1990] 2 SCR 731	Mar 27, 1990	Sep 13, 1990	C–M	M	C–M	NS	C–R; 1	C–R; 2	C–M	C–M	NS
R. v. J.(J.T.), [1990] 2 SCR 755	Mar 27, 1990	Sep 13, 1990	C–M	M	C–M	NS	D	C–R	C–M	C–M	NS
Case	Argued	Decided	Dickson	Lamer	Wilson	La Forest	L'Heureux-Dubé	Sopinka	Gonthier	Cory	McLachlin
Clarke v. Clarke, [1990] 2 SCR 795	Dec 6, 1989	Oct 4, 1990	C–U	NS	U	C–U	C–U	C–U	NS	C–U	C–U
Commission de transport de la Communauté urbaine de Québec v. Canada (National Battlefields Commission), [1990] 2 SCR 838	Jan 22, 1990	Oct 4, 1990	NS	C–U	C–U	NS	C–U	C–U	U	C–U	C–U
R. v. Penno, [1990] 2 SCR 865	Jan 31, 1990	Oct 4, 1990	NS	C–R; 1	C–R; 2	C–R; 3	C–C; 2	P	C–P	NS	C–P
R. v. Hess ; R. v. Nguyen, [1990] 2 SCR 906	Feb 1, 1990	Oct 4, 1990	NS	C–M	M	C–M	C–M	C–R	C–D	NS	D
Hunt v. Carey Canada Inc., [1990] 2 SCR 959	Feb 22, 1990	Oct 4, 1990	NS	C–U	U	C–U	C–U	C–U	C–U	C–U	NS
Caisse populaire des Deux Rives v. Société mutuelle d'assurance contre l'incendie de la Vallée du Richelieu, [1990] 2 SCR 995	Mar 20, 1990	Oct 4, 1990	NS	NS	NS	C–U	U	NS	C–U	C–U	C–U
National Bank of Greece (Canada) v. Katsikonouris, [1990] 2 SCR 1029	Mar 20, 1990	Oct 4, 1990	NS	NS	NS	M	D	NS	C–D	C–M	C–M
Danson v. Ontario (Attorney General), [1990] 2 SCR 1086	Jun 1, 1990	Oct 4, 1990	NS	C–U	C–U	NS	NS	U	NS	C–U	C–U
Case	Argued	Decided	Dickson	Lamer	Wilson	La Forest	L'Heureux-Dubé	Sopinka	Gonthier	Cory	McLachlin	Stevenson (Note: Justice Stevenson took office on September 17, 1990.)
R. v. Paquette, [1990] 2 SCR 1103	Oct 2, 1990	Oct 2, 1990	NJ	Bench; U	C–U	C–U	C–U	C–U	C–U	C–U	NS	NS
R. v. Huang, [1990] 2 SCR 1105	Oct 3, 1990	Oct 3, 1990	NJ	NS	Bench; U	C–U	NS	C–U	C–U	NS	NS	C–U
R. v. Tremblay, [1990] 2 SCR 1106	Oct 5, 1990	Oct 5, 1990	NJ	Bench; U	NS	C–U	C–U	NS	C–U	C–U	NS	NS
R. v. Drolet, [1990] 2 SCR 1107	Oct 9, 1990	Oct 9, 1990	NJ	Bench; U	NS	NS	C–U	C–U	NS	C–U	C–U	NS
R. v. Shupe, [1990] 2 SCR 1108	Oct 9, 1990	Oct 9, 1990	NJ	NS	Bench; U	C–U	C–U	C–U	NS	NS	C–U	NS
Lanificio Fratelli Bettazzi S.N.C. v. Tissus Ranchar Inc., [1990] 2 SCR 1109	Oct 10, 1990	Oct 10, 1990	NJ	Bench; M	C–M	C–M	C–M	C–M	NS	C–M	NS	D
R. v. Thompson, [1990] 2 SCR 1111 (Note: Justice McIntyre sat on the hearing, but resigned on February 15, 1989, and did not participate in the decision of any case rendered more than six months after that date.)	Nov 29, 30, 1988	Oct 18, 1990	C–M	C–M	D 1	D 2	C–M	M	NJ	NJ	NJ	NJ
General Trust of Canada v. Artisans Coopvie, Société coopérative d'assurance‑vie, [1990] 2 SCR 1185	Feb 27, 1990	Oct 18, 1990	NS	C–U	C–U	C–U	C–U	NS	U	C–U	C–U	NJ
R. v. Askov, [1990] 2 SCR 1199	Mar 23, 1990	Oct 18, 1990	C–M	C–R; 1	C–R; 2	C–M	C–M	C–R; 3	C–M	M	C–R; 4	NJ
Lacroix v. Valois, [1990] 2 SCR 1259	Apr 26, 1990	Oct 18, 1990	NS	C–U	NS	C–U	NS	NS	U	C–U	C–U	NJ
Case	Argued	Decided	Dickson	Lamer	Wilson	La Forest	L'Heureux-Dubé	Sopinka	Gonthier	Cory	McLachlin	Stevenson
R. v. Chambers, [1990] 2 SCR 1293	May 28, 1990	Oct 18, 1990	C–M	C–M	NS	C–M	D	C–M	NS	M	C–M	NJ
Canada v. Fries, [1990] 2 SCR 1322	Nov 1, 1990	Nov 1, 1990	NJ	Bench; U	C–U	C–U	C–U	Bench; U	C–U	C–U	C–U	NS
National Corn Growers Assn. v. Canada (Import Tribunal), [1990] 2 SCR 1324	Mar 29, 1990	Nov 8, 1990	C–C	C–C	C–R	C–M	C–M	NS	M	NS	C–M	NJ
Steele v. Mountain Institution, [1990] 2 SCR 1385	May 25, 1990	Nov 8, 1990	C–U	C–U	NS	C–U	C–U	NS	C–U	U	C–U	NJ
R. v. Francella, [1990] 2 SCR 1420	Nov 1, 1990	Nov 8, 1990	NJ	NS	U	NS	NS	C–U	NS	C–U	C–U	C–U
R. v. Garofoli, [1990] 2 SCR 1421	Oct 3, 4, 1989	Nov 22, 1990	C–M	C–M	NS	C–M	C–D	M	C–M	NS	D	NJ
R. v. Lachance, [1990] 2 SCR 1490	Oct 3, 4, 1989	Nov 22, 1990	C–M	C–M	NS	C–M	C–D	M	C–M	NS	D	NJ
Dersch v. Canada (Attorney General), [1990] 2 SCR 1505	Apr 27, 1988; Oct 2, 1989 (Note: Re-hearing. The panel on the original hearing was Justices Beetz, McIntyre, Lamer, Wilson, Le Dain, La Forest and L'Heureux‑Dubé.)	Nov 22, 1990	C–M	C–M	NS	C–M	C–C	M	C–M	NS	C–R	NJ
R. v. Zito, [1990] 2 SCR 1520	Oct 3, 1989	Nov 22, 1990	C–M	C–M	NS	C–M	C–C	M	C–M	NS	C–R	NJ
Case	Argued	Decided	Dickson	Lamer	Wilson	La Forest	L'Heureux-Dubé	Sopinka	Gonthier	Cory	McLachlin	Stevenson

=== Supreme Court Reports 1990: volume 3 ===
By the Court (C)
Unanimous reasons for judgment (U)
Concurred in the unanimous reasons (C–U)
Majority reasons for judgment (M)
Concurred in the majority (C–M)
Concurring reasons (C–R)
Concurred in the concurring reasons (C–C)
Plurality reasons (P)
Concurred in the plurality reasons (C–P)
Dissenting reasons (D)
Concurred in the dissent (C–D)
Dissenting in part (D–P)
Concurred in the partial dissent (C–DP)
Seriatim reasons (S)
Concurred in seriatim reasons (C–S)
Motion (Mo)
Did not sit on the appeal (NS)
Did not participate in the judgment (NP)
Not a Justice of the Court at the time of hearing or judgment (NJ)
- "Decision by the Court" means that it is a unanimous judgment of the Court, not attributed to any particular justice.
- "Unanimous reasons for judgment" indicated a unanimous decision, written by a particular justice.
- Multiple concurrences and dissents within a case are numbered, with concurrences by other numbered accordingly. Justices occasionally concur in multiple reasons in a single case; each concurrence is subdivided accordingly.
- Reasons are sometimes drafted jointly by two or more justices.
- Decisions that are given orally from the bench are denoted by "Bench" on the justice who gave the oral decision.

Case	Argued	Decided	Dickson (Note: Chief Justice Dickson retired June 29, 1990.)	Lamer	Wilson	La Forest	L'Heureux-Dubé	Sopinka	Gonthier	Cory	McLachlin	Stevenson (Note: Justice Stevenson took office on September 17, 1990.)
R. v. Kokesch, [1990] 3 SCR 3 (Note: Chief Justice Dickson resigned on June 29, 1989. As permitted by the Supreme Court Act, he continued to participate in judgments on appeals he heard before his resignation, for up to six months.)	Feb 21, 1990	Nov 22, 1990	D	NS	C–M	C–M	C–D	M	NS	C–D	C–M	NJ
R. v. Wong, [1990] 3 SCR 36	May 2, 1990	Nov 22, 1990	C–M	C–R	D	M	C–M	C–M	NS	NS	C–C	NJ
R. v. Kirkness, [1990] 3 SCR 74	May 3, 1990	Nov 22, 1990	NS	C–M	D	C–M	C–D	C–M	C–M	M	NS	NJ
Houle v. Canadian National Bank, [1990] 3 SCR 122	May 3, 1990	Nov 22, 1990	NS	C–U	C–U	C–U	U	C–U	C–U	C–U	NS	NJ
Fletcher v. Manitoba Public Insurance Co., [1990] 3 SCR 191	Jun 1, 1990	Nov 22, 1990	NS	C–U	U	NS	NS	C–U	NS	C–U	C–U	NJ
McKinney v. University of Guelph, [1990] 3 SCR 229	May 16, 17, 1989	Dec 6, 1990	C–P	NS	D 1	P	D 2	C–R; 1	C–P	C–R; 2	NS	NJ
Harrison v. University of British Columbia, [1990] 3 SCR 451	May 17, 18, 1989	Dec 6, 1990	C–P	NS	D 1	P	D 2	C–R; 1	C–P	C–R; 2	NS	NJ
Stoffman v. Vancouver General Hospital, [1990] 3 SCR 483	May 19, 1989	Dec 6, 1990	C–P	NS	D 1	P	D 2	C–R	C–P	D 3	NS	NJ
Douglas/Kwantlen Faculty Assn. v. Douglas College, [1990] 3 SCR 570	May 17, 18, 1989	Dec 6, 1990	C–P	NS	C–R; 1	P	C–C; 1	C–R; 2	C–P	C–R; 3	NS	NJ
R. v. Kuldip, [1990] 3 SCR 618	Mar 28, 1990	Dec 7, 1990	C–M	M	D	C–D	C–D	NS	C–M	NS	C–M	NJ
Case	Argued	Decided	Dickson	Lamer	Wilson	La Forest	L'Heureux-Dubé	Sopinka	Gonthier	Cory	McLachlin	Stevenson
Lester (W.W.) (1978) Ltd. v. United Association of Journeymen and Apprentices of the Plumbing and Pipefitting Industry, Local 740, [1990] 3 SCR 644	Apr 26, 1990	Dec 7, 1990	C–D; 1	C–M	D 1	C–M	D 2	C–M	C–M	C–D; 1	M	NJ
R. v. Fulop, [1990] 3 SCR 695	Dec 10, 1990	Dec 10, 1990	NJ	Bench; U	NS	NS	NS	Bench; U	C–U	NS	C–U	C–U
R. v. Keegstra, [1990] 3 SCR 697	Dec 5, 6, 1989	Dec 13, 1990	M	NS	C–M	D 2	C–M	C–D; 1	C–M	NS	D 1	NJ
R. v. Andrews, [1990] 3 SCR 870	Dec 4, 5, 1989	Dec 13, 1990	M	NS	C–M	D 2	C–M	C–D; 1	C–M	NS	D 1	NJ
Canada (Human Rights Commission) v. Taylor, [1990] 3 SCR 892	Dec 4, 1989	Dec 13, 1990	M	NS	C–M	C–DP	C–M	C–DP	C–M	NS	D–P	NJ
R. v. Scott, [1990] 3 SCR 979	Jun 18, 1990	Dec 13, 1990	C–M	C–D; 1	C–M	C–D; 1	C–M	D 2	C–M	M	D 1	NJ
McClurg v. Canada, [1990] 3 SCR 1020	Nov 29, 1989	Dec 20, 1990	M	NS	C–D	D	C–D	C–M	C–M	C–M	NS	NJ
Morguard Investments Ltd. v. De Savoye, [1990] 3 SCR 1077	Apr 23, 1990	Dec 20, 1990	C–U	NS	NS	U	C–U	C–U	C–U	C–U	C–U	NJ
United Transportation Union v. Central Western Railway Corp., [1990] 3 SCR 1112	Apr 30, 1990	Dec 20, 1990	M	C–M	D	C–M	C–M	C–M	C–M	C–M	C–M	NJ
Old St. Boniface Residents Assn. Inc. v. Winnipeg (City), [1990] 3 S.C.R. 1170	May 1, 1990	Dec 20, 1990	C–M	C–R	C–M	D	C–D	M	C–M	C–D	C–M	NJ
Case	Argued	Decided	Dickson	Lamer	Wilson	La Forest	L'Heureux-Dubé	Sopinka	Gonthier	Cory	McLachlin	Stevenson
Save Richmond Farmland Society v. Richmond (Township), [1990] 3 SCR 1213	May 1, 1990	Aug 16, 1990; Dec 20, 1990 (Note: Judgment issued August 16, 1990; reasons delivered December 20, 1990.)	C–M	C–C	C–M	C–R	C–C	M	C–M	C–M	C–M	NJ
MacDonald Estate v. Martin, [1990] 3 SCR 1235	May 4, 1990	May 10, 1990; Dec 20, 1990 (Note: Judgment delivered May 10, 1990; reasons delivered Dec 20, 1990.)	C–M	NS	C–C	C–M	C–C	M	C–M	C–R	NS	NJ
Whitbread v. Walley, [1990] 3 SCR 1273	May 24, 1990	Dec 20, 1990	C–U	C–U	NS	U	C–U	C–U	C–U	C–U	NS	NJ
R. v. Chaulk, [1990] 3 SCR 1303	May 29, 30, 1990	Dec 20, 1990	C–M	M	C–R	C–M	C–D	C–M	C–D	C–M	D	NJ
Re Manitoba Language Rights Order, [1990] 3 SCR 1417	Dec 7, 1990	Dec 7, 1990	NJ	Bench; Mo	NS	Mo	Mo	NS	Mo	Mo	Mo	Mo
R. v. Pilon, [1990] 3 SCR 1422	Dec 3, 1990	Dec 13, 1990	NJ	NS	NS	Mo	Mo	Mo	Mo	NS	Mo	NS
Case	Argued	Decided	Dickson	Lamer	Wilson	La Forest	L'Heureux-Dubé	Sopinka	Gonthier	Cory	McLachlin	Stevenson

== Summaries ==
Summary of Judgments 1990
Type	Number
By the Court	3
Unanimous	58
Majority with concurrences	27
Majority with dissents	33
Majority with dissents in part	1
Plurality with concurrence	4
Plurality with dissent	8
Seriatim with dissents	2
Motions	4
Total	140

Summary of Each Justice's Positions 1990
Decision Type	Dickson	Lamer	Wilson	La Forest	L'Heureux-Dubé	Sopinka	Gonthier	Cory	McLachlin	Stevenson (Note: Justice Stevenson was appointed on September 17, 1990. The court only delivered 45 judgments from that date to the end of the year, so that is his total number of entries in this table.)
Court	2	1	2	3	3	2	2	3	3	0
Unanimous	11	14	11	7	5	8	6	8	7	0
Unanimous (concurring)	15	31	33	38	40	44	47	48	40	3
Majority	5	12	5	4	1	9	3	10	5	0
Majority (concurring)	31	17	21	24	25	13	38	20	15	0
Concurring reasons	0	10	6	6	3	19	0	4	5	0
Concurred in concurrence	3	2	4	3	7	0	1	0	4	0
Plurality	3	1	2	5	0	2	0	0	0	0
Plurality (concurrence)	4	2	0	3	1	4	6	1	1	0
Seriatim	2	1	0	3	3	1	0	0	0	0
Dissent	2	0	15	7	11	5	0	4	10	1
Dissent (concurrence)	3	4	4	3	15	3	5	4	1	0
Dissenting in part	0	0	0	0	0	1	0	0	1	0
Dissenting in part (concurrence)	0	1	0	1	0	1	0	0	0	0
Motion	0	1	1	2	2	3	2	1	3	1
Not Sitting	48	43	36	31	24	25	22	29	31	6
Not a Justice	11	0	0	0	0	0	8	8	14	34

Judgments Issued, 1981 to 1990
Year	Judgments	Chief Justice
1990	140	Dickson
1989	133	Dickson
1988	106	Dickson
1987	94	Dickson
1986	76	Dickson
1985	84	Dickson
1984	63	Dickson
1983	90	Laskin
1982	118	Laskin
1981	112	Laskin
Ten-Year Average		102
Source: Supreme Court Judgments, 1979 to 1988
