= Apple Computer, Inc. v Mackintosh Computers Ltd. =

- Supreme Court of Canada

Hearing: February 26, 1990 Judgment: June 21, 1990
- Full case name: Mackintosh Computers Limited, Compagnie d'Électronique Repco Ltée./Repco Electronics Company Limited, Maison des Semiconducteurs Ltée./House of Semiconductors Limited, Chico Levy and Nat Levy v. Apple Computer, Incorporated; 115778 Canada Incorporated, carrying on business under the firm name and style of Microcom, James Begg and 131375 Canada Incorporated v. Apple Computer, Incorporated
- Citations: [1990] 2 S.C.R. 209; 71 D.L.R. (4th) 95
- Docket No.: 20643
- Prior history: Judgment for Apple Computer, Inc. in the Federal Court of Appeal.
- Ruling: Appeal dismissed

Holding
- Programs embedded on a microchip are protected by copyright under the Copyright Act.

Court membership
- Chief Justice: Brian Dickson; Puisne Justices: Antonio Lamer, Bertha Wilson, Gérard La Forest, Claire L'Heureux-Dubé, John Sopinka, Charles Gonthier, Peter Cory, Beverley McLachlin

Reasons given
- Unanimous reasons by: Cory J.

Laws applied
- Copyright Act, R.S.C. 1970, c. C-30

Apple Computer, Inc. v Mackintosh Computers Ltd. [1990] 2 S.C.R. 209, is a Supreme Court of Canada case on copyright law regarding the copyrightability of software. The Court found that programs within ROM silicon chips (in this case, the Autostart ROM and Applesoft in Apple II+ systems) are protected under the Copyright Act, and that the conversion from the source code into object code was a reproduction that did not alter the copyright protection of the original work.

== Background ==
The defendant Mackintosh Computers Ltd. was a manufacturer of unlicensed Apple II+ clones that were capable of running software designed for Apple II+ computers. At issue in this case were the Autostart ROM and Applesoft programs embedded in the computer chips of Apple's computers.

At trial, the defendants conceded that they copied the chips in question by burning the contents of Apple's ROM chips into their own EPROMs They further conceded that software written in assembly code was copyrightable under the Copyright Act as literary works. However, the defendants argued that they had not infringed Apple's copyright in the assembly code because they had copied only the contents of the ROMs in question.

The trial judge found that the software burned into Apple's ROMs were both a translation and reproduction of the assembly language source code, thus were protected by s. 3(1) of the Copyright Act.

The Federal Court of Appeal dismissed the appeal. Two of the appellate judges held that the object code was a reproduction of the assembly code, while the third held that the object code could be considered either a translation or a reproduction, both protected by copyright.

== Ruling ==
The Supreme Court held that the machine code embedded in the Apple ROM chips was an exact reproduction of the written assembly code, and as such were protected by s. 3(1) of the Copyright Act. The court further rejected the argument that the machine code fell under the merger doctrine, holding that the programs were a form of expression.

The Supreme Court declined to follow the case of Computer Edge Pty. Ltd. v. Apple Computer, Inc. decided by the High Court of Australia, which had virtually identical facts. In that case, the court held that the chips contained a "sequence of electrical impulses" which could not be subject to copyright.

== Aftermath ==
Not long after the case, the Copyright Act of Canada was amended to explicitly include software as a "literary work" within the Act.

== See also ==
- Apple Inc. litigation
- Apple Computer, Inc. v. Franklin Computer Corp., 714 F.2d 1240 (3d Cir. 1983), a similar case heard by the United States Court of Appeals for the Third Circuit
- Computer Edge Pty. Ltd. v. Apple Computer, Inc. (1986), 65 A.L.R. 33, a similar case heard by the High Court of Australia
- International Business Machines Corporation v. Computer Imports Ltd., [1989] 2 NZLR 395, a similar case heard by the High Court of New Zealand
