= The Rhône v The Peter AB Widener =

- Supreme Court of Canada

Hearing: May 26, 1992 Judgment: February 25, 1993
- Citations: [1993] 1 S.C.R. 497
- Prior history: APPEALS from a judgment of the Federal Court of Appeal, affirming in part a judgment of Denault J.
- Ruling: Appeals allowed, L'Heureux-Dubé and McLachlin JJ. dissenting in part.

Court membership
- Chief Justice: Antonio Lamer; Puisne Justices: Gérard La Forest, Claire L'Heureux-Dubé, John Sopinka, Charles Gonthier, Peter Cory, Beverley McLachlin, William Stevenson, Frank Iacobucci

Reasons given
- Majority: Iacobucci J., joined by La Forest, Sopinka, Gonthier and Cory JJ.
- Concur/dissent: McLachlin J., joined by L'Heureux-Dubé J.

The Rhône v The Peter AB Widener is a Supreme Court of Canada decision on the "directing mind" principle of corporate liability. The Court held that an individual must have "governing authority over the management and operation" of the corporation to be considered a "directing mind".

== Background ==
While moored in the Port of Montreal, the Rhône was struck by the Peter Widener, a barge that was being towed by four tugboats (the Ohio in front, the South Carolina and the Ste. Marie II on either side, and the Rival at the rear). Of the four tugs, only two, the South Carolina and the Ohio, were owned by Great Lakes Towing Company. Captain Kelch, on the tug Ohio, acted as de facto master of the flotilla.

The owners of the Rhône sued the barge and the tug owners for damaging their ship, and North Central Maritime Corporation, the owner of the barge, sued Great Lakes for breach of its towage contract. Great Lakes denied liability in both actions and counterclaimed for limitation of liability pursuant to provisions of the Canada Shipping Act. At the Trial Division of the Federal Court of Canada, the judge apportioned 80 percent of the liability to Great Lakes and 20 percent to North Central in the first action (based on the negligence of the respective captains), and found Great Lakes to be totally at fault in the second action.

Great Lakes appealed both decisions to the Federal Court of Appeal, and North Central also cross‑appealed the trial judge's finding of fault against the Widener. In its ruling, the FCA:

- confirmed the finding of negligence against Captain Kelch on the Ohio and against the Widener but rejected the assessment of fault against the South Carolina, noting that any errors it had made had been pursuant to orders from Captain Kelch on the Ohio and not any negligence on the part of those responsible for her navigation
- maintained the trial judge's overall finding with respect to both the negligence and the apportionment of liability as between Great Lakes and North Central
- agreed with the trial judge that Captain Kelch was a directing mind of Great Lakes, at least for the purpose of carrying out Great Lakes' obligations in relation to the tow of the Widener. As such, it found Great Lakes was not entitled to limit its liability since the damage did not occur "without its actual fault or privity".

Great Lakes challenged the denial of its counterclaims through appeal to the Supreme Court of Canada. There were three issues at bar:

1. Is the captain of Great Lakes' tug Ohio a directing mind of Great Lakes by virtue of the fact that he exercised some discretion and performed some non‑navigational functions as an incident of his employment?
2. Does s. 647(2) of the Canada Shipping Act apply to limit Great Lakes' liability with respect to errors committed in the navigation of other vessels within the flotilla not owned by Great Lakes?
3. In the event that Great Lakes is entitled to limit its liability under the Canada Shipping Act, what vessels must be taken into account in determining the extent of its liability?

== Opinion ==
The appeals were allowed, and Iacobucci J held in his ruling:

1. There was no actual fault or privity on the part of Great Lakes on the basis that Captain Kelch was a directing mind of the corporation. The key factor which distinguishes directing minds from normal employees is the capacity to exercise decision-making authority on matters of corporate policy, rather than merely to give effect to such policy on an operational basis, whether at head office or across the sea. Although Captain Kelch was master of the Ohio, he did not have governing authority over the management and operation of Great Lakes' tugs.
2. Yes. S. 647(2) provides that the owner of a ship may limit its liability for damage caused to another vessel through "any other act or omission of any person on board that ship". Limiting Great Lakes' liability accords not only with the clear words of the statute but also with the purpose underlying this section — namely, removing the threat of unlimited liability to a shipowner.
3. The intent of s. 647(2) is to limit liability for navigational errors according only to the tonnage of those vessels causing the alleged damage. Apart from the vessel responsible for the overall navigation of a flotilla, only those vessels of the same shipowner which physically caused or contributed to the resulting damage form the unit for which liability is limited. Here, the appropriate unit of limitation under s. 647(2) is the tonnage of the tug Ohio alone. As the South Carolina did not physically contribute to the collision in any manner, she cannot be held to be a "guilty" vessel or part of the "wrongdoing mass".

McLachlin J (as she then was), joined by L'Heureux‑Dubé J, dissented with respect to the last issue, holding that, in cases of navigational error affecting the conduct of a flotilla, s. 647(2) provides that all the vessels owned by the party responsible for the error which are affected by the error, whether involved directly in the accident or contributing causally to the accident, should be considered for purposes of determining the maximum liability of that party.

== See also ==
- Corporate manslaughter
- List of Supreme Court of Canada cases (Lamer Court)
- R v Canadian Dredge & Dock Co
