= 1987 judgments of the Supreme Court of Canada =

Supreme Court of Canada Cour suprême du Canada
- Established: April 8, 1875
- Jurisdiction: General court of appeal for Canada
- Motto: Justitia et Veritas
- Authorized by: Supreme Court Act, RSC 1985, c. S-26
- Appeals from: Provincial and federal courts of appeal
- Judge term length: From appointment until age 75
- Number of positions: Nine
- Language: English and French
- Website: Supreme Court of Canada

The tables below list the judgments delivered by the Supreme Court of Canada during 1987. The judgments are listed in the order of publication in the Supreme Court Reports, starting with the first judgments of the year, rendered on January 29, 1987, and ending with the last judgments, rendered on December 17, 1987. The table gives a general illustration of the positions taken by each justice in each case, and how justices concurred or dissented with the decisions of the majority.

At this time, the Supreme Court normally reserved its judgment after hearing argument on an appeal, and then gave its judgment at some later date by delivering its decision in open court. In some cases, the court gave its judgment from the bench at the conclusion of the hearing, with a short outline of its reasons. Those judgments are indicated in the table. The court also could give its decision on an appeal from the bench at the conclusion of the hearing, reasons to follow at a later date. Those judgments are included on the date reasons are given, which may be in a subsequent year.

This table includes cases which were argued in a previous year and reserved, with the judgment given in 1987. Cases which were heard in 1987 and reserved, with judgment in a later year, are included in the article for the later year.

The Court gave 94 judgments in 1987, reported in two volumes of the Supreme Court Reports.

There were two changes in the membership of the court during 1987:

- Justice Chouinard died on February 6, 1987, after seven years on the court.
- Justice L'Heureux-Dubé, a judge of the Quebec Court of Appeal, was appointed on April 15, 1987, succeeding Justice Chouinard.

There was also one significant absence. In late 1985, Justice Estey was appointed by the federal government to hold a public inquiry into the collapse of two federally chartered banks. He was away from the court in late 1985 and much of 1986, which is reflected in his absence from many appeals heard during that period with the decision rendered in 1987.

== Judgments ==
=== Supreme Court Reports 1987: volume 1 ===
By the Court (C)
Unanimous reasons for judgment (U)
Concurred in the unanimous reasons (C–U)
Majority reasons for judgment (M)
Concurred in the majority (C–M)
Concurring reasons (C–R)
Concurred in the concurring reasons (C–C)
Plurality reasons (P)
Concurred in the plurality reasons (C–P)
Dissenting reasons (D)
Concurred in the dissent (C–D)
Dissenting in part (D–P)
Concurred in the partial dissent (C–DP)
Seriatim reasons (S)
Concurred in seriatim reasons (C–S)
Motion (Mo)
Did not sit on the appeal (NS)
Did not participate in the judgment (NP)
Not a Justice of the Court at the time of hearing or judgment (NJ)
- "Decision by the Court" means that it is a unanimous judgment of the Court, not attributed to any particular justice.
- "Unanimous reasons for judgment" indicated a unanimous decision, written by a particular justice.
- Multiple concurrences and dissents within a case are numbered, with concurrences by other numbered accordingly. Justices occasionally concur in multiple reasons in a single case; each concurrence is subdivided accordingly.
- Reasons are sometimes drafted jointly by two or more justices.
- Decisions that are given orally from the bench are denoted by "Bench" on the justice who gave the oral decision.

| Case name | Argued | Decided | Dickson | Beetz | Estey | McIntyre | Chouinard (Note: Justice Chouinard died on February 6, 1987. He is shown as "Not Participating" for decisions in which he heard the appeal, but was unable to participate in the judgment of the Court before he died.) | Lamer | Wilson | Le Dain | La Forest | L'Heureux-Dubé (Note: Justice L'Heureux-Dubé was appointed on April 15, 1987, succeeding Justice Chouinard.) |
| Kosmopoulos v. Constitution Insurance Co., [1987] 1 SCR 2 | Nov 1, 6, 1985 | Jan 29, 1987 | NS | C–M | NS | C–R | NP | C–M | M | C–M | C–M | NJ |
| Bronfman Trust v. The Queen, [1987] 1 SCR 32 | Jun 20, 1986 | Mar 5, 1987 | U | C–U | NS | C–U | NP | C–U | C–U | NS | C–U | NJ |
| Marlex Petroleum Inc. v. The Har Rai, [1987] 1 SCR 57 | Dec 17, 18, 1986 | Jan 29, 1987 | C | C | C | C | NP | C | C | NS | NS | NJ |
| Bank of Nova Scotia v. Angelica‑Whitewear Ltd., [1987] 1 SCR 59 | Mar 11, 1985 | Mar 5, 1987 | NS | C–U | C–U | NS | NP | NS | NS | U | C–U | NJ |
| Manitoba (A.G.) v. Metropolitan Stores Ltd., [1987] 1 SCR 110 | Jun 20, 1986 | Mar 5, 1987 | NS | U | NS | C–U | NS | C–U | NS | C–U | C–U | NJ |
| Québec (A.G.) v. Healy, [1987] 1 SCR 158 | Oct 28, 1986 | Mar 5, 1987 | C–U | C–U | C–U | C–U | U (Note: In giving judgment in Québec (A.G.) v. Healy on March 5, 1987, Chief Justice Dickson stated: "We adopt the reasons for judgment written and circulated by our late and much respected Justice Chouinard during the Fall Term. The reasons follow.") | C–U | C–U | C–U | C–U | NJ |
| Irvine v. Canada (Restrictive Trade Practices Commission), [1987] 1 SCR 181 (Note: Justice La Forest was appointed on January 16, 1985, filling a vacancy left after Justice Ritchie announced his retirement in the fall of 1984. He therefore was not yet a justice when the Irvine case was heard in 1984.) | Oct 25, 26, 1984 | Mar 26, 1987 | C–U | C–U | U | C–U | NP | C–U | NS | C–U | NJ | NJ |
| Office de la construction du Québec v. Larochelle, [1987] 1 SCR 241 | Apr 1, 1987 | Apr 1, 1987 | NS | Bench; C | NS | NS | NJ | C | C | C | C | NJ |
| R. v. Lacroix, [1987] 1 SCR 244 | Nov 1, 6, 1985 | Jan 29, 1987 | NS | Bench; C | NS | C | NP | NS | NS | C | C | NJ |
| R. v. Wigman, [1987] 1 SCR 246 | Nov 6, 1985; Feb 6, 1986 (Note: Rehearing.) | Apr 9, 1987 | C | C | NS | C | NP | C | NS | C | C | NJ |
| Case name | Argued | Decided | Dickson | Beetz | Estey | McIntyre | Chouinard | Lamer | Wilson | Le Dain | La Forest | L'Heureux-Dubé |
| R. v. Collins, [1987] 1 SCR 265 | May 27, 1986 | Apr 9, 1987 | C–M | NS | NS | D | NP | M | C–M | C–R | C–M | NJ |
| R. v. Sieben, [1987] 1 SCR 295 | May 27, 28, 1986 | Apr 9, 1987 | C–M | NS | NS | C–R | NP | M | C–M | C–M | C–M | NJ |
| R. v. Hamill, [1987] 1 SCR 301 | May 27, 28, 1986 | Apr 9, 1987 | C–M | NS | NS | C–R | NP | M | C–M | C–M | C–M | NJ |
| R. v. Labrosse, [1987] 1 SCR 310 | Oct 29, 1986 | Apr 9, 1987 | NS | C–R | NS | M Joint | NP | M Joint | NS | NS | M Joint | NJ |
| Reference Re Public Service Employee Relations Act (Alta.), [1987] 1 SCR 313 | Jun 27, 28, 1985 | Apr 9, 1987 | D | C–P; 1 | NS | C–P; 2 | NP | NS | D | P 1 | C–P; 1 | NJ |
| PSAC v. Canada, [1987] 1 SCR 424 | Oct 7, 8, 1985 | Apr 9, 1987 | D–P | C–P; 1 | NS | C–P; 2 | NP | NS | D | P | C–P; 1 | NJ |
| RWDSU v. Saskatchewan, [1987] 1 SCR 460 | Oct 8, 1985 | Apr 9, 1987 | C–P; 2 | C–P; 1 | NS | C–P; 3 | NP | NS | D | P 1 | C–P; 1 | NJ |
| R. v. Limoges, [1987] 1 SCR 497 | Apr 10, 1987 | Apr 10, 1987 | NS | Bench; U | NS | NS | NJ | C–U | C–U | C–U | C–U | NJ |
| R. v. Gould, [1987] 1 SCR 499 | May 7, 1987 | May 7, 1987 | NS | NS | NS | Bench; U | NJ | C–U | C–U | C–U | NS | C–U |
| Canada v. Schmidt, [1987] 1 SCR 500 | Dec 18, 1985 | May 14, 1987 | C–M | C–M | NS | C–M | NS | C–R; 1 | C–R; 2 | C–M | M | NJ |
| Case name | Argued | Decided | Dickson | Beetz | Estey | McIntyre | Chouinard | Lamer | Wilson | Le Dain | La Forest | L'Heureux-Dubé |
| Argentina v. Mellino, [1987] 1 SCR 536 | Dec 19, 1985 | May 14, 1987 | C–M | C–M | NS | C–M | NS | D | C–R | C–M | M | NJ |
| United States v. Allard, [1987] 1 SCR 564 | Dec 19, 20, 1985 | May 14, 1987 | C–M | C–M | NS | C–M | NS | D | C–R | C–M | M | NJ |
| R. v. Vermette, [1987] 1 SCR 577 | Apr 23, 1986 | May 14, 1987 | C–U | NS | NS | U | NP | C–U | C–U | NS | NS | NJ |
| R. v. Rahey, [1987] 1 SCR 588 | Jun 17, 1986 | May 14, 1987 | C–S; 1 | C–S; 3 | C–S; 2 | C–S; 4 | NP | S 1 | S 2 | S 3 | S 4 | NJ |
| R. v. Thatcher, [1987] 1 SCR 652 | Dec 9, 1986 | May 14, 1987 | M | C–M | C–M | NS | NS | C–R; 1 | C–M | C–M | C–R; 2 | NJ |
| Restaurant Le Clémenceau Inc. v. Drouin, [1987] 1 SCR 706 | May 14, 1987 | May 14, 1987 | NS | Bench; C | NS | C | NJ | C | NS | C | C | NS |
| Canadian Pacific Hotels Ltd. v. Bank of Montreal, [1987] 1 SCR 711 | Apr 24, 1985 | Jun 4, 1987 | NS | NS | C–M | C–M | NP | C–M | C–M | M | C–R | NJ |
| R. v. Bulmer, [1987] 1 SCR 782 | Feb 7, 1986 | Jun 4, 1987 | C–M | NS | NS | M | NP | C–R | C–M | C–M | C–M | NJ |
| Pelech v. Pelech, [1987] 1 SCR 801 | Mar 24, 1986 | Jun 4, 1987 | C–M | NS | NS | C–M | NP | C–M | M | C–M | C–R | NJ |
| Richardson v. Richardson, [1987] 1 SCR 857 | Mar 24, 25, 1986 | Jun 4, 1987 | C–M | NS | NS | C–M | NP | C–M | M | C–M | D | NJ |
| Case name | Argued | Decided | Dickson | Beetz | Estey | McIntyre | Chouinard | Lamer | Wilson | Le Dain | La Forest | L'Heureux-Dubé |
| Caron v. Caron, [1987] 1 SCR 892 | Mar 25, 1986 | Jun 4, 1987 | C–M | NS | NS | C–M | NP | C–M | M | C–M | C–R | NJ |
| St. Pierre v. Ontario (Minister of Transportation), [1987] 1 SCR 906 | Mar 26, 1986 | Jun 4, 1987 | NS | NS | NS | U | NP | C–U | C–U | C–U | NS | NJ |
| R. v. Robertson, [1987] 1 SCR 918 | Dec 16, 17, 1986 | Jun 4, 1987 | C–U | C–U | C–U | C–U | NP | C–U | U | C–U | C–U | NJ |
| R. v. Pohoretsky, [1987] 1 SCR 945 | Apr 8, 1987 | Jun 4, 1987 | C–U | C–U | NS | C–U | NJ | U | C–U | C–U | C–U | NJ |
| R. v. Faulkner, [1987] 1 SCR 951 | Jun 5, 1987 | Jan 5, 1987 | NS | Bench; U | NS | C–U | NJ | C–U | C–U | C–U | C–U | C–U |
| Wotherspoon v. Canadian Pacific Ltd, [1987] 1 SCR 952 | Apr 1, 2, 3, 4, 1985 | Jun 25, 1987 | NS | C–U | U | C–U | NP | C–U | NS | C–U | C–U | NJ |
| R. v. Smith, [1987] 1 SCR 1045 | Dec 10, 1985 | Jun 25, 1987 | C–P | NS | NS | D | NP | P | C–R; 1 | C–R; 2 | C–R; 3 | NJ |
| CN v. Canada (Canadian Human Rights Commission), [1987] 1 SCR 1114 | Nov 5, 6, 1986 | Jun 25, 1987 | U | C–U | C–U | C–U | NP | C–U | C–U | C–U | C–U | NJ |
| Reference re Bill 30, An Act to Amend the Education Act (Ont.), [1987] 1 SCR 1148 | Jan 29, 30 and Feb 2, 3, 4, 5, 1987 | Jun 25, 1987 | C–M | C–C; 1 | C–R; 1 | C–M | NS | C–R; 2 | M | NS | C–M | NJ |
| R. v. Nolan, [1987] 1 SCR 1212 | Mar 6, 1987 | Jun 25, 1987 | U | C–U | C–U | C–U | NJ | NS | C–U | C–U | C–U | NJ |
| Case name | Argued | Decided | Dickson | Beetz | Estey | McIntyre | Chouinard | Lamer | Wilson | Le Dain | La Forest | L'Heureux-Dubé |
| R. v. Manninen, [1987] 1 SCR 1233 | Apr 3, 1987 | Jun 25, 1987 | C–U | C–U | NS | C–U | NJ | U | C–U | C–U | C–U | NJ |
| N.V. Bocimar S.A. v. Century Insurance Co., [1987] 1 SCR 1247 | Apr 9, 10, 1987 | Jun 25, 1987 | NS | C–M | NS | NS | NJ | D | C–M | M | C–M | NJ |
| R. v. Lapointe and Sicotte, [1987] 1 SCR 1253 | Jun 3, 1987 | Jun 25, 1987 | C | C | NS | NS | NJ | C | C | C | C | C |
| R. v. Video World Ltd., [1987] 1 SCR 1255 | Jun 3, 1987 | Jun 25, 1987 | NS | C | NS | C | NJ | C | C | C | C | C |

=== Supreme Court Reports 1987: Volume 2 ===
By the Court (C)
Unanimous reasons for judgment (U)
Concurred in the unanimous reasons (C–U)
Majority reasons for judgment (M)
Concurred in the majority (C–M)
Concurring reasons (C–R)
Concurred in the concurring reasons (C–C)
Plurality reasons (P)
Concurred in the plurality reasons (C–P)
Dissenting reasons (D)
Concurred in the dissent (C–D)
Dissenting in part (D–P)
Concurred in the partial dissent (C–DP)
Seriatim reasons (S)
Concurred in seriatim reasons (C–S)
Motion (Mo)
Did not sit on the appeal (NS)
Did not participate in the judgment (NP)
Not a Justice of the Court at the time of hearing or judgment (NJ)
- "Decision by the Court" means that it is a unanimous judgment of the Court, not attributed to any particular justice.
- "Unanimous reasons for judgment" indicated a unanimous decision, written by a particular justice.
- Multiple concurrences and dissents within a case are numbered, with concurrences by other numbered accordingly. Justices occasionally concur in multiple reasons in a single case; each concurrence is subdivided accordingly.
- Reasons are sometimes drafted jointly by two or more justices.
- Decisions that are given orally from the bench are denoted by "Bench" on the justice who gave the oral decision.

| Case name | Argued | Decided | Dickson | Beetz | Estey | McIntyre | Lamer | Wilson | Le Dain | La Forest | L'Heureux-Dubé (Note: Justice L'Heureux-Dubé was appointed on April 15, 1987, succeeding Justice Chouinard.) |
| Ontario (Attorney General) v. OPSEU, [1987] 2 SCR 2 (Note: Justice Chouinard sat at the hearing of the appeal, but died on February 6, 1987, before judgment was rendered.) | Mar 18, 19, 1986 | Jul 29, 1987 | C–R; 1 | M | NS | C–M | C–R | NS | C–M | C–M | NJ |
| Rio Hotel Ltd. v. New Brunswick (Liquor Licensing Board), [1987] 2 SCR 59 | Oct 6, 1986 | Jul 29, 1987 | M | C–R; 2 | C–R; 1 | C–M | C–C; 1 | C–M | C–M | NS | NJ |
| Robichaud v. Canada (Treasury Board), [1987] 2 SCR 84 | May 6, 1987 | Jul 29, 1987 | C–M | NS | NS | C–M | C–M | C–M | C–R | M | C–M |
| Frame v. Smith, [1987] 2 SCR 99 | Mar 29, 1986 | Sep 17, 1987 | C–M | C–M | NS | C–M | C–M | D | NS | M | NJ |
| R. v. Monteleone, [1987] 2 S.C.R. 154 | Oct 31, 1986 | Sep 17, 1987 | C–U | NS | C–U | U | C–U | C–U | C–U | U | NJ |
| R. v. Yebes, [1987] 2 SCR 168 | Dec 16, 1986 | Sep 17, 1987 | C–U | NS | C–U | U | C–U | C–U | C–U | NS | NJ |
| Holt v. Telford, [1987] 2 SCR 193 | Feb 27, March 2, 1987 | Sep 17, 1987 | C–U | NS | C–U | C–U | NS | U | C–U | NS | NJ |
| Supermarchés Jean Labrecque Inc. v. Flamand, [1987] 2 SCR 219 | Jun 9, 1987 | Sep 17, 1987 | NS | C–U | NS | NS | C–U | NS | C–U | C–U | U |
| C.(G.) v. V.‑F.(T.), [1987] 2 SCR 244 | Jun 11, 1987 | Sep 17, 1987 | C–U | U | NS | NS | NS | C–U | C–U | C–U | NS |
| Schenck v. Ontario; Rokeby v. Ontario, [1987] 2 SCR 289 | Oct 13, 1987 | Oct 13, 1987 | Bench; U | NS | C–U | C–U | NS | C–U | C–U | C–U | C–U |
| Case name | Argued | Decided | Dickson | Beetz | Estey | McIntyre | Lamer | Wilson | Le Dain | La Forest | L'Heureux-Dubé |
| R. v. Ackworth, [1987] 2 SCR 291 | Oct 13, 1987 | Oct 13, 1987 | Bench; U | C–U | C–U | C–U | NS | NS | C–U | C–U | C–U |
| R. v. Chase, [1987] 2 SCR 293 | Apr 25, 1986 | Oct 15, 1987 | C–U | C–U | NS | U | C–U | C–U | C–U | NS | NJ |
| R. v. Trask, [1987] 2 SCR 304 | May 6, 1987 | Jul 29, 1987 | C–U | C–U | NS | U | C–U | C–U | C–U | NS | NS |
| R. v. Lyons, [1987] 2 SCR 309 | Jan 28, 29, 1987 | Oct 15, 1987 | C–M | NS | C–M | C–M | D–P; 1 | D–P; 2 | C–M | M | NJ |
| R. v. Albright, [1987] 2 SCR 383 | Feb 27, 1987 | Oct 15, 1987 | C–U | NS | C–U | C–U | U | C–U | NS | NS | NJ |
| R. v. Béland, [1987] 2 SCR 398 | Mar 31, 1987 | Oct 15, 1987 | C–M | C–M | NS | M | C–DP | D–P | C–M | C–R | NJ |
| R. v. Tremblay, [1987] 2 SCR 435 | Apr 3, 1987 | Oct 15, 1987 | C–U | C–U | NS | C–U | U | C–U | C–U | C–U | NJ |
| Keneric Tractor Sales Ltd. v. Langille, [1987] 2 SCR 440 | May 13, 1987 | Oct 15, 1987 | C–U | C–U | NS | C–U | NS | U | NS | C–U | NS |
| R. v. Dawson, [1987] 2 SCR 461 | Oct 16, 1987 | Oct 16, 1987 | Bench; U | C–U | C–U | C–U | NS | C–U | C–U | C–U | C–U |
| R. v. Aiello, [1987] 2 SCR 462 | Oct 16, 1987 | Oct 16, 1987 | Bench; U | C–U | C–U | C–U | NS | C–U | NS | C–U | C–U |
| Case name | Argued | Decided | Dickson | Beetz | Estey | McIntyre | Lamer | Wilson | Le Dain | La Forest | L'Heureux-Dubé |
| R. v. Doz, [1987] 2 SCR 463 | Oct 19, 1987 | Oct 19, 1987 | NS | Bench; U | C–U | C–U | C–U | C–U | C–U | NS | C–U |
| R. v. Briglio, [1987] 2 SCR 465 | Oct 21, 1987 | Oct 21, 1987 | NS | Bench; U | C–U | C–U | C–U | C–U | C–U | NS | C–U |
| Canada (Dir. of Investigation) v. NFLD. Telephone, [1987] 2 SCR 466 | May 29, 1986 | Nov 19, 1987 | NS | C–U | NS | C–U | C–U | C–U | U | NS | NJ |
| Canada (Dir. of Investigation) v. N.B. Telephone, [1987] 2 SCR 485 | May 29, 1986 | Nov 29, 1987 | NS | C–U | NS | C–U | C–U | C–U | U | NS | NJ |
| Canada (A.G.) v. Brault, [1987] 2 SCR 489 | Oct 31, 1986 | Nov 19, 1987 | NS | C–U | NS | NS | C–U | NS | U | C–U | NJ |
| Doré v. Canada, [1987] 2 SCR 503 | Oct 31, 1986 | Nov 19, 1987 | NS | C–U | NS | NS | C–U | NS | U | C–U | NJ |
| R. v. Milne, [1987] 2 SCR 512 | Jan 27, 28, 1987 | Nov 19, 1987 | C–M | NS | D | C–M | C–M | DP | C–M | M | NJ |
| Fisch v. White, [1987] 2 SCR 535 | Oct 21, 1987 | Nov 19, 1987 | NS | C | C | NS | C | C | C | NS | NS |
| R. v. Baig, [1987] 2 SCR 537 | Oct 22, 1987 | Nov 19, 1987 | NS | C | C | C | C | C | C | NS | C |
| R. v. Wigglesworth, [1987] 2 SCR 541 | Mar 3, 4, 1987 | Nov 19, 1987 | C–M | C–M | D | C–M | C–M | M | NS | C–M | NJ |
| Case name | Argued | Decided | Dickson | Beetz | Estey | McIntyre | Lamer | Wilson | Le Dain | La Forest | L'Heureux-Dubé |
| Burnham v. Metropolitan Toronto Police, [1987] 2 SCR 572 | Mar 4, 5, 6, 1987 | Nov 19, 1987 | C–U | C–U | C–U | C–U | C–U | U | NS | C–U | NJ |
| Trumbley and Pugh v. Metropolitan Toronto Police, [1987] 2 SCR 577 | Mar 4, 5, 6, 1987 | Nov 19, 1987 | C–U | C–U | C–U | C–U | C–U | U | NS | C–U | NJ |
| Trimm v. Durham Regional Police, [1987] 2 SCR 582 | Mar 4, 5, 6, 1987 | Nov 19, 1987 | C–U | C–U | C–U | C–U | C–U | U | NS | C–U | NJ |
| O'Hara v. British Columbia, [1987] 2 SCR 591 | Jun 2, 1987 | Nov 19, 1987 | M | C–M | D | C–M | C–M | C–M | C–M | C–M | C–M |
| R. v. Paré, [1987] 2 SCR 618 | Jun 8, 1987 | Nov 19, 1987 | C–U | C–U | NS | C–U | C–U | U | C–U | C–U | NS |
| R. v. Vaillancourt, [1987] 2 SCR 636 | Dec 10, 1986 | Dec 3, 1987 | C–P | C–R; 1 | C–P | D | P | C–P | C–C; 1 | C–R; 2 | NJ |
| R. v. Laviolette, [1987] 2 SCR 667 | May 6, 1987 | Jul 29, 1987 | C–P | C–R; 1 | C–P | C–R; 3 | P | C–P | C–C; 1 | C–R; 2 | NJ |
| Lensen v. Lensen, [1987] 2 SCR 672 | Dec 15, 1986 | Dec 3, 1987 | U | C–U | C–U | C–U | C–U | C–U | NS | NS | NJ |
| R. v. Genser, [1987] 2 SCR 685 | Dec 4, 1987 | Dec 4, 1987 | NS | NS | NS | Bench; U | C–U | C–U | NS | C–U | C–U |
| R. v. Colgan, [1987] 2 SCR 686 | Dec 4, 1987 | Dec 4, 1987 | NS | NS | NS | Bench; U | C–U | C–U | NS | C–U | C–U |
| Case name | Argued | Decided | Dickson | Beetz | Estey | McIntyre | Lamer | Wilson | Le Dain | La Forest | L'Heureux-Dubé |
| Stony Mountain Institution v. Howard, [1987] 2 SCR 687 | Dec 9, 1987 | Dec 9, 1987 | Bench; U | C–U | C–U | C–U | C–U | C–U | C–U | C–U | C–U |
| R. v. Rubio, [1987] 2 SCR 688 | Dec 11, 1987 | Dec 11, 1987 | NS | Bench; U | NS | NS | C–U | NS | C–U | C–U | C–U |
| St-Pierre v. The Queen, [1987] 2 SCR 690 | Dec 15, 1987 | Dec 15, 1987 | NS | Bench; U | NS | NS | C–U | NS | C–U | C–U | C–U |
| R. v. Uddin, [1987] 2 SCR 692 | Dec 17, 1987 | Dec 17, 1987 | Bench; U | NS | C–U | NS | NS | C–U | NS | C–U | C–U |
| R. v. Urbanovich, [1987] 2 SCR 693 | Dec 16, 1987 | Dec 16, 1987 | Bench; U | NS | C–U | NS | NS | C–U | NS | C–U | C–U |
| R. v. Barrow, [1987] 2 SCR 694 | Mar 25, 26, 1987 | Dec 17, 1987 | M | C–M | C–M | D | NS | C–M | C–D | C–M | NJ |
| Town of Métabetchouan v. Théberge, [1987] 2 SCR 746 | Oct 21, 1987 | Dec 17, 1987 | NS | C–U | C–U | C–U | U | NS | C–U | NS | NS |
| Klimashewski v. Klimashewski Estate, [1987] 2 SCR 754 | Dec 2, 1987 | Dec 17, 1987 | NS | NS | C | C | NS | C | NS | C | C |
| R. v. Grimwood, [1987] 2 SCR 755 | Dec 3, 1987 | Dec 17, 1987 | NS | NS | C | NS | C | C | NS | C | C |
| Calgary v. Northern Construction Co., [1987] 2 SCR 757 | Dec 3, 1987 | Dec 17, 1987 | NS | NS | C–M | M | NS | C–R | NS | C–M | C–C |
| Case name | Argued | Decided | Dickson | Beetz | Estey | McIntyre | Lamer | Wilson | Le Dain | La Forest | L'Heureux-Dubé |

== Summaries ==
Summary of judgments 1987
| Type | Number |
|---|---|
| By the Court | 11 |
| Unanimous | 49 |
| Majority with concurrences | 15 |
| Majority with dissents | 6 |
| Majority with dissents and concurrences | 3 |
| Majority with dissents and dissenting in part | 1 |
| Majority with dissents in part | 1 |
| Majority with concurrences and dissents in part | 1 |
| Plurality with concurrences | 1 |
| Plurality with dissents | 3 |
| Plurality with concurrences and dissents | 2 |
| Seriatim | 1 |
| Total | 94 |

Summary of each Justice's Positions 1987
| Decision Type | Dickson | Beetz | Estey | McIntyre | Chouinard | Lamer | Wilson | Le Dain | La Forest | L'Heureux-Dubé |
|---|---|---|---|---|---|---|---|---|---|---|
| Court | 3 | 9 | 5 | 7 | 0 | 9 | 8 | 8 | 8 | 5 |
| Unanimous | 11 | 8 | 2 | 9 | 1 | 5 | 7 | 5 | 0 | 1 |
| Unanimous (concurring) | 19 | 29 | 23 | 30 | 0 | 33 | 31 | 31 | 34 | 15 |
| Majority | 4 | 1 | 0 | 4 | 0 | 4 | 6 | 2 | 8 | 0 |
| Majority (concurring) | 17 | 11 | 5 | 16 | 0 | 10 | 11 | 17 | 12 | 2 |
| Concurring reasons | 1 | 4 | 2 | 4 | 0 | 5 | 5 | 3 | 8 | 0 |
| Concurred in concurrence | 0 | 1 | 0 | 0 | 0 | 1 | 0 | 2 | 0 | 1 |
| Dissent | 1 | 0 | 3 | 4 | 0 | 3 | 3 | 0 | 1 | 0 |
| Dissent (concurrence) | 0 | 0 | 0 | 0 | 0 | 0 | 1 | 1 | 0 | 0 |
| Dissenting in part | 1 | 0 | 0 | 0 | 0 | 1 | 3 | 0 | 0 | 0 |
| Dissenting in part (concurrence) | 0 | 0 | 0 | 0 | 0 | 1 | 0 | 0 | 0 | 0 |
| Plurality reasons | 0 | 0 | 0 | 0 | 0 | 3 | 0 | 3 | 0 | 0 |
| Plurality reasons (concurring) | 4 | 3 | 2 | 3 | 0 | 0 | 2 | 0 | 3 | 0 |
| Seriatim | 0 | 0 | 0 | 0 | 0 | 1 | 1 | 1 | 1 | 0 |
| Seriatim (concurring) | 1 | 1 | 1 | 1 | 0 | 0 | 0 | 0 | 0 | 0 |
| Not Sitting | 32 | 27 | 51 | 16 | 16 | 18 | 16 | 21 | 18 | 8 |
| Not Participating | 0 | 0 | 0 | 0 | 26 | 0 | 0 | 0 | 0 | 0 |
| Not a Justice | 0 | 0 | 0 | 0 | 51 | 0 | 0 | 0 | 1 | 62 |

Judgments issued, 1978 to 1987
| Year | Judgments | Chief Justice |
|---|---|---|
| 1987 | 94 | Dickson |
| 1986 | 76 | Dickson |
| 1985 | 84 | Dickson |
| 1984 | 63 | Dickson |
| 1983 | 90 | Laskin |
| 1982 | 118 | Laskin |
| 1981 | 112 | Laskin |
| 1980 | 112 | Laskin |
| 1979 | 137 | Laskin |
| 1978 | 116 | Laskin |
| Ten-Year Average | | 100 |
Source: Supreme Court Judgments, 1978 to 1987

== See also ==
Lists of Supreme Court of Canada cases
