= R v Béland =

Case of the Supreme Court of Canada

- Supreme Court of Canada

Hearing: March 31, 1987 Judgment: October 15, 1987
- Full case name: Her Majesty the Queen v. Alain Béland and Bruce Phillips
- Citations: [1987] 2 S.C.R. 398
- Docket No.: 18856
- Prior history: Judgment against the Crown in the Court of Appeal for Quebec
- Ruling: Appeal allowed

Holding
- Polygraph analysis as evidence of a witness's credibility will generally be inadmissible

Court membership
- Chief Justice: Brian Dickson; Puisne Justices: Jean Beetz, Willard Estey, William McIntyre, Julien Chouinard, Antonio Lamer, Bertha Wilson, Gerald Le Dain, Gérard La Forest

Reasons given
- Majority: McIntyre (Dickson, Beetz and Le Dain concurring)
- Concurrence: La Forest
- Dissent: Wilson (Lamer concurring)
- Estey and Chouinard took no part in the consideration or decision of the case.

R v Béland [1987] 2 S.C.R. 398 is a Supreme Court of Canada decision where the Court rejected the use of polygraph results as evidence in court.

== Background ==
Alain Béland, Bruce Phillips, and two others were planning a robbery. However, before going through with the plan, both Béland and Phillips were arrested and charged with conspiracy to commit robbery. At trial, the Crown summoned a witness who implicated Béland and Phillips. The defendants asserted that the evidence was false and, following the presentation of evidence, tried for an order to reopen the defence in order to present polygraph results. The trial judge rejected the motion on the basis that polygraph evidence was inadmissible, and they were convicted. On appeal, the majority from the Court of Appeal granted an order to reopen the trial to allow the trial judge to examine the polygraph evidence.

The issue was presented to the Supreme Court of Canada as to whether "evidence of the results of a polygraph examination is admissible in light of the particular facts of this case". In a five to two decision, the Court overturned the Court of Appeal and held that polygraph evidence was inadmissible.

== Decision of the Court ==
Justice William Rogers McIntyre, writing for the majority, held that polygraphs were inadmissible because they violated several rules of evidence. Polygraphs, if used for showing credibility, would violate the rule against "oath-helping", which prevents the use of evidence only to prove good credibility. Second, it also violates the rule against the admission of previous out-of-court statements. Third, it violates the character evidence rule that prohibits evidence that attacks character. Lastly, the polygraph is a type of expert evidence that must be excluded, as matters of credibility are already within the experience of the judges and juries.

McIntyre also added that the use of the polygraph will unnecessarily complicate the process and bring in too many uncertainties due to its frequency of error.

Justice La Forest, in separate concurring reasons, agreed with McIntyre's result but on the basis that the polygraph had too much mystique that would unduly influence the jury and the potential for opening up too many collateral issues.

== Dissent ==
Lamer and Wilson held that the polygraph evidence was admissible. The results went directly to a key issue of the case: Who is to be believed, the informer or the defendants? The probative value of the evidence outweighed its prejudicial effect, and so it would be unfair to deny the defendants access to a full defence.
