= R v Canadian Dredge & Dock Co =

- Supreme Court of Canada

Hearing: May 24–26, 1983 Judgment: May 23, 1985
- Full case name: Canadian Dredge & Dock Company, Limited, Marine Industries Limited, The J.P. Porter Company Limited, and Richelieu Dredging Corporation Inc. v. Her Majesty The Queen
- Citations: [1985] 1 S.C.R. 662
- Docket No.: 16425
- Prior history: APPEALS from judgments of the Ontario Court of Appeal, sub nom. R. v. McNamara (No. 1), (1981), 56 C.C.C. (2d) 193, dismissing appeals from convictions.
- Ruling: Appeals dismissed.

Holding
- The identification theory should be applied to determine when a corporation is liable for a crime: the identity of the company and the identity of the directing mind coincides. If a directing mind of the corporation, commits a crime within his or her assigned field of operation, without being totally in fraud of the corporation, which by design or result benefits the corporation, then the corporation is also liable for the crime.

Court membership
- Chief Justice: Bora Laskin; Puisne Justices: Roland Ritchie, Brian Dickson, Jean Beetz, Willard Estey, William McIntyre, Julien Chouinard, Antonio Lamer, Bertha Wilson

Reasons given
- Unanimous reasons by: Estey J.
- Laskin C.J. and Ritchie J. took no part in the consideration or decision of the case.

R v Canadian Dredge & Dock Co is a landmark Supreme Court of Canada decision on corporate liability where the Court adopted the English identification doctrine for liability, which states that culpability for acts and mental states of a corporation can be represented by employees and officers on the basis that they are the "directing mind" of the corporate entity.

== Background ==
In 1967–1973, the Government of Canada issued a series of tenders for dredging operations performed in the Saint Lawrence River and several of the Great Lakes, for which contracts were granted. It was later discovered that a process of bid rigging had occurred, and a complex trial involving twenty defendants took place. Among the defendants were four corporations (Canadian Dredge & Dock Company, Marine Industries Limited, The J.P. Porter Company Limited, and Richelieu Dredging Corporation Inc.) which were charged and convicted with the offences of fraud and conspiracy under the Criminal Code in effect at the time.

The Ontario Court of Appeal dismissed all appeals relating to the convictions, and the defendants appealed to the Supreme Court of Canada on the following issues:

1. Is the criminal liability of a corporation, when it is based on the misconduct of a directing mind of the corporation, affected because the person who is the directing mind is at the same time acting, in whole or in part, in fraud of the corporation, or wholly or partly for his own benefit or contrary to instructions that he not engage in any illegal activities in the course of his duties?
2. Was there any evidence that a directing mind of the applicant corporation was acting wholly or in part in fraud of the corporation during the period covered by the indictments herein or acting wholly or in part for his own benefit during that period or contrary to instructions that he not engage in illegal activities in the course of his duties and, if so, is the criminal liability of the corporation affected by any one or more of such circumstances?

== Opinion of the Court ==
All appeals were dismissed. Estey J, for a unanimous Court, held the four companies liable of bid rigging under the identification doctrine, which assigns primary liability — as opposed to vicarious liability — to a corporation where the actor‑employee who physically committed the offence is the ego of it. As he observed:

... the corporate vehicle now occupies such a large portion of the industrial, commercial and sociological sectors that amenability of the corporation to our criminal law is as essential in the case of the corporation as in the case of the natural person.

Therefore, even in mens rea offences, if the court finds the officer or managerial level employee to be a vital organ of the company and virtually its directing mind in the sphere of duty assigned him so that his actions and intent are the action and intent of the company itself, the company can be held criminally liable. The directing mind must act within the scope of his authority — i.e., his actions must be performed within the sector of the corporate operation assigned to him. The sector may be functional, or geographic, or may embrace the entire undertaking of the corporation.

However, the doctrine will not extend to cases where the directing mind intentionally defrauds the corporation and when his wrongful actions form the substantial part of the regular activities of his office. Thus, the identification doctrine only operates where the Crown demonstrates that the action taken by the directing mind:

- was within the field of operation assigned to him,
- was not totally in fraud of the corporation, and
- was by design or result partly for the benefit of the company.

In this appeal, the Crown's case was successful. As Estey J noted:

These contracts were awarded as the result of tenders made by the directing minds of the respective corporate participants. The evidence is overwhelming that as a result of the system developed by their respective directing minds, the appellants received benefits in the form of contracts and subcontracts, direct payouts and other benefits. It is also evident that the directing minds who committed this wrongful conduct benefited themselves in a variety of ways including cash receipts, share positions in participating companies, and other arrangements. It was in fact a "share the wealth" project for the benefit of all concerned except the public authorities who awarded the dredging contracts. It is, therefore, impossible to come to any conclusion other than that reached by the trial judge and the Court of Appeal that in these activities the directing minds were acting partly for the benefit of the employing appellant and partly for their own benefit. Accordingly the factual basis for a corporate defence of lack of intended and received corporate benefit is not present in these appeals.

== Impact and subsequent events ==
Canadian Dredge marked a departure of Canadian jurisprudence in the matter of corporate liability from that determined in other Commonwealth jurisprudence, most notably in Tesco Supermarkets Ltd v Nattrass. As Estey J explained:

The identity doctrine merges the board of directors, the managing director, the superintendent, the manager or anyone else delegated by the board of directors to whom is delegated the governing executive authority of the corporation, and the conduct of any of the merged entities is thereby attributed to the corporation.... [A] corporation may, by this means, have more than one directing mind. This must be particularly so in a country such as Canada where corporate operations are frequently geographically widespread. The transportation companies, for example, must of necessity operate by the delegation and sub‑delegation of authority from the corporate centre; by the division and subdivision of the corporate brain; and by decentralizing by delegation the guiding forces in the corporate undertaking. The application of the identification rule in Tesco ... may not accord with the realities of life in our country, however appropriate we may find to be the enunciation of the abstract principles of law there made.

However, it did confirm the rejection of US jurisprudence on the subject, which has favoured the use of the doctrine of vicarious liability:

...the concept of vicarious liability in the law of torts has been traditionally fenced in by the concept of the employee acting within "the scope of his employment" and not, in the classic words, "on a frolic of his own". The identification theory, however, is not concerned with the scope of employment in the tortious sense....

The identification doctrine was further elaborated upon in The Rhone v. The Peter A.B. Widener, where Iacobucci J stated:

The key factor which distinguishes directing minds from normal employees is the capacity to exercise decision-making authority on matters of corporate policy, rather than merely to give effect to such policy on an operational basis....

In 2003, the Criminal Code was amended to revise the rules relating to criminal liability, including:

- extending liability to organizations that are not corporations,
- distinguishing between offences that involve negligence and those involving other types of fault, and
- prescribing a legal duty for anyone directing the work of another person to take reasonable steps to prevent bodily harm to that person, or any other person, arising from that work or task.
