= R v Sansregret =

- Supreme Court of Canada

Hearing: October 11, 1984 Judgment: May 9, 1985
- Full case name: John Henry Sansregret v. Her Majesty the Queen
- Citations: [1985] 1 SCR 570
- Docket No.: 18186
- Ruling: Appeal dismissed.

Court membership
- Chief Justice: Brian Dickson; Puisne Justices: Roland Ritchie, Jean Beetz, Willard Estey, William McIntyre, Julien Chouinard, Antonio Lamer, Bertha Wilson, Gerald Le Dain

Reasons given
- Unanimous reasons by: McIntyre J.
- Ritchie and Beetz JJ. took no part in the consideration or decision of the case.

R v Sansregret [1985] 1 S.C.R. 570 is a leading Supreme Court of Canada case on the requirements and defence for the criminal charge of rape.

== Background ==
The appellant, John Sansregret and the complainant lived together. Their relationship had been one of contention and discord with violence on the part of the appellant: "slappings" or "roughing up" in his description, "blows" in hers. On September 23, 1982, the complainant decided to end their relationship. A few days later the appellant became furious and attacked the complainant with a file-like object. The complainant managed to calm him down by holding out hope of some sort of reconciliation and engaging in intercourse with the appellant. The complainant reported the incident to the police, but no charges were laid. On October 15, 1982, the appellant again broke into the complainant's house. The appellant picked up a butcher knife and entered the complainant's bedroom. The complainant, fearful for her life, again tried to calm down the appellant by pretending that there was some hope of reconciliation. They engaged in intercourse shortly later, but the complainant stated that she engaged in intercourse only to prevent further violence by the appellant. She later filed charges against the appellant for rape.

== Mistake of Fact ==
The trial judge found that the appellant was not guilty of rape as defined in (then) s.143(a). Following the decision in Pappajohn v The Queen, a mistake of fact defence would be allowed for rape when there was an honest belief in that fact, regardless of the reasonableness of that belief. In this case, even though the trial judge did not believe that the appellants belief in consent was even remotely reasonable, she did find that it was honest: "As I said, no rational person could have been under any honest mistake of fact. However, people have an uncanny ability to blind themselves to much that they do not want to see, and to believe in the existence of facts as they would wish them to be."

== Reasons of the court ==
Justice McIntyre, writing for a unanimous Court, entered a conviction on the basis that even if the accused was not subjectively aware that there was no consent, he was wilfully blind to the lack of consent. The culpability of wilful blindness is the accused’s refusal to inquire whether the complainant was consenting, when he was aware of the need for some inquiry, but decided not to inquire because he did not want to know the truth. Because the appellant was willfully blind to the consent of the complainant, the defense of mistake of fact cannot apply.

An annotation by A. Manson criticizes McIntyre's decision pointing out that the Supreme Court only has jurisdiction to hear issues of law. Since the trial judge found as a matter of fact that the appellant held the honest belief that consent had been freely given, a finding that the appellant was willfully blind to whether consent had been given involved a judgement on an issue of fact.
