= Computer Edge v Apple =

Judgement of the High Court of Australia

- Court: High Court of Australia
- Full case name: Computer Edge Pty. Ltd. v. Apple Computer, Inc.
- Decided: 6 May 1986
- Citation: [1986] HCA 19

Court membership
- Judges sitting: Gibbs CJ, Mason, Wilson, Brennan, and Deane JJ

Computer Edge v Apple was a decision handed down by the High Court of Australia on 6 May 1986, concerning copyright in computer software.

The appellant was an importer of 'Wombat' personal computers compatible with the Apple operating system. The respondent had instituted proceedings in the Federal Court of Australia alleging that the applicants had infringed copyright in two computer programs related to the Apple system, namely the Autostart program and the Applesoft program.

It had been held at trial before Beaumont J that there was no breach of copyright, as neither source nor object code could be defined as literary works under the Copyright Act.

The verdict had then been appealed to the Full Court of the Federal Court of Australia, where it was held unanimously that the two Apple programs were original literary works. The majority also held that the Apple read only memory (ROM) chips in the Wombat computer were sufficiently derived from these literary works to constitute an infringement of copyright.

Special leave to appeal was granted, and in the High Court of Australia it was held that machine-readable works were not literary works under the 1968 Copyright Act.

Consequences of the successful High Court appeal were limited in scope. The decision in the original 1983 trial had already caused major ramifications for the relatively young field of software for personal computing. Soon after the 1983 decision was handed down, the Australian Attorney-General Gareth Evans announced that legislation would be amended to ensure computer software was protected by the Copyright Act and this occurred via the Copyright Amendment Act 1984 No. 43 of 1984. This had rendered the High Court outcome of no consequence, or "moot" for future activity although it retained significance for the parties to litigation themselves.
