= Gérard La Forest =

Canadian judge and lawyer (1926–2025)

Gérard La Forest CC KC FRSC

Puisne Justice of the Supreme Court of Canada
- In office January 16, 1985 – September 30, 1997
- Nominated by: Brian Mulroney
- Preceded by: Roland Ritchie
- Succeeded by: Michel Bastarache

Personal details
- Born: Gérard Vincent La Forest; April 1, 1926 Grand Falls, New Brunswick, Canada
- Died: June 12, 2025 (aged 99)
- Occupation: Lawyer

Gérard Vincent La Forest CC KC FRSC (April 1, 1926 – June 12, 2025) was a Canadian judge who was a puisne justice of the Supreme Court of Canada. He served in that capacity from January 16, 1985 to September 30, 1997. He was later counsel at the law firm of Stewart McKelvey in Fredericton, New Brunswick.

== Early life and education ==
Born in Grand Falls, New Brunswick, to J. Alfred La Forest and Philomène Lajoie, he first studied at St. Francis Xavier University and then went on to study law at the University of New Brunswick, obtaining a BCL in 1949. Following law school he was awarded a Rhodes scholarship and attended St John's College, Oxford receiving a BA in 1951 and an MA in 1956. He then went on to study at Yale University, completing an LL.M in 1965 and an LL.D in 1966. He was called to the Bar of New Brunswick in 1949 and was designated a Queen's Counsel in 1968.

== Career ==
From 1952 to 1955 he worked in the federal Department of Justice, then later as a legal adviser. In 1956 La Forest began teaching at the University of New Brunswick, moving to the University of Alberta to become dean of the Faculty of Law in 1968.

From 1970 to 1974, he went back to work for the federal government as assistant deputy attorney general of Canada (research & planning). Afterwards he was a member of the Law Reform Commission of Canada, until 1979 when he returned to teaching at the University of Ottawa.

In 1977, following the election of the separatist Parti Québécois government the previous year, the Canadian Bar Association set up a Committee on the Constitution. The Committee's mandate was to study and make recommendations on the Constitution of Canada. La Forest was asked to be the executive director for the committee's work. The members of the Committee were drawn from each province of Canada, and included two future provincial premiers, two future provincial chief justices, and a future Canadian Ambassador to the United Nations. The Committee presented its report to the CBA at the next annual meeting, in 1978. The Committee made wide-ranging recommendations for constitutional change, including a completely new constitution, abolishing the monarchy, changing the Senate, entrenching language rights and a bill of rights, and changing the balance of powers between the federal government and the provinces.

In 1981 he was appointed to the New Brunswick Court of Appeal. Then on January 16, 1985 he was appointed to the Supreme Court of Canada, staying until September 30, 1997.

== Later life and death ==
After leaving the Supreme Court, La Forest returned to practice, becoming counsel at Stewart McKelvey in Fredericton, New Brunswick.

La Forest died on June 12, 2025, at the age of 99.

== Honours, awards and affiliations ==
In 1975, La Forest was made a Fellow of the Royal Society of Canada. He was awarded honorary LL.D. degrees from the University of Basel (1981), St. Francis Xavier University (1988), St. Thomas University (1988), University of Alberta (1988), University of Moncton (1988) and Bates College (1990). He was made Doctor of Civil Law by the University of New Brunswick in 1985, the same year he received a D.U. from the University of Ottawa.

In 2000, he was made a Companion of the Order of Canada.

== Published works ==
- La Forest, Gérard V. (1965). Disallowance and Reservation of Provincial Legislation. Ottawa, Ontario, Canada: Department of Justice. OCLC 460115805.
- Brossard, Jacques; Immarigeon, Henriette; La Forest, Gérard V.; Patenaude, Luce (1970). Le territoire québécois. Montreal, Quebec, Canada: Presses de l'Université de Montréal. ISBN 9780840501363.
- La Forest, Gérard V. (1973). Water law in Canada: The Atlantic provinces. Ottawa, Ontario, Canada: Ministry of Regional Economic Expansion. OCLC 2931579.
- La Forest, Gérard V. (1977). Extradition To and From Canada. Toronto, Ontario, Canada: Canada Law Book Ltd. ISBN 9780888040015.
- La Forest, Gérard V. (1981). The Allocation of Taxing Power Under the Canadian Constitution. Toronto, Ontario, Canada: Canadian Tax Foundation. ISBN 9780888080066.
- La Forest, Gérard V. (2020). Natural Resources and Public Property Under the Canadian Constitution. Toronto, Ontario, Canada: University of Toronto Press. ISBN 9781487585969.

== See also ==
- 1987 judgments of the Supreme Court of Canada
- 1988 judgments of the Supreme Court of Canada
- 1989 judgments of the Supreme Court of Canada
