= Antonio Lamer =

Chief Justice of Canada from 1990 to 2000

The Right Honourable Antonio Lamer PC CC CD

16th Chief Justice of Canada
- In office July 1, 1990 – January 6, 2000
- Nominated by: Brian Mulroney
- Appointed by: Ray Hnatyshyn
- Preceded by: Brian Dickson
- Succeeded by: Beverley McLachlin

Puisne Justice of the Supreme Court of Canada
- In office March 28, 1980 – July 1, 1990
- Nominated by: Pierre Trudeau
- Appointed by: Edward Schreyer
- Preceded by: Louis-Philippe Pigeon
- Succeeded by: William Stevenson

Puisne Judge of the Court of Appeal of Quebec
- In office 1978–1980

2nd Communications Security Establishment Commissioner
- In office June 19, 2003 – August 1, 2006
- Preceded by: Claude Bisson
- Succeeded by: Charles Gonthier

Personal details
- Born: July 8, 1933 Montreal, Quebec
- Died: November 24, 2007 (aged 74) Ottawa, Ontario
- Spouse: Danièle Tremblay-Lamer (m. 1987)
- Education: Université de Montréal

Military service
- Allegiance: Canadian Army
- Branch/service: Royal Regiment of Canadian Artillery; Canadian Intelligence Corps
- Years of service: 1950–1960

Joseph Antonio Charles Lamer PC CC CD (July 8, 1933 – November 24, 2007) was a Canadian lawyer and jurist who served as the 16th Chief Justice of Canada from 1990 to 2000.

== Career ==
Lamer practised in partnership at the firm of Cutler, Lamer, Bellemare and Associates and was a full professor in the Faculty of Law, Université de Montréal, where he was also a lecturer in criminology.

On December 19, 1969, at the age of 36, he was appointed to the Quebec Superior Court and to the Queen's Bench (Crown Side) of the province of Quebec. In 1978, he was elevated to the Quebec Court of Appeal and was appointed to the Supreme Court of Canada in 1980. Brian Mulroney named Lamer as Chief Justice on July 1, 1990.

On January 7, 2000, Lamer took an unexpected early retirement after having served as chief justice for ten years. Several years after his death, former judges spoke about the situation surrounding his retirement. According to a 2011 article in The Globe and Mail, in February 1999, a "delegation of three veteran judges" including former Supreme Court judge John C. Major, selected by their colleagues met with Lamer to tell him that "his performance was not what it had been up until this time." To which he immediately responded, "Well, then I'll resign." Lamer finally agreed to resign following a second meeting with Justices Major, Peter Cory and Charles Gonthier in the spring of 1999. He announced in an August 1999 talk to the Canadian Bar Association, that he would be resigning from the Supreme Court in January 2000.

After he retired, Lamer joined a large law firm, Stikeman Elliott, in a senior advisory role and was appointed associate professor of law at the Université de Montréal in 2000. He was appointed Communications Security Establishment Commissioner on June 19, 2003, a position he held until August 1, 2006. He also served as honorary colonel of the Governor General's Foot Guards.

In a CBC interview, Lamer described how the Supreme Court of Canada was transformed following the 1982 Canadian Charter of Rights and Freedoms under then Prime Minister Pierre Trudeau which expanded the role of the judiciary. Lamer described it as "somewhat of a shock to see their job description changed so fundamentally." Eugene Meehan, who was Lamer's first executive legal officer at the Supreme Court of Canada described Lamer as "a foundational builder", who was "one of the key architects of how courts interpret" the 1982 Charter" ..."building on the work of his predecessor as chief justice, Brian Dickson."

In March 2003, the government of Newfoundland and Labrador asked Lamer to head a public inquiry into several wrongful convictions in Newfoundland specifically to oversee an inquiry into how the criminal justice system dealt with three discredited murder convictions. The hearings lasted about three years. Lamer was tasked to conduct an investigation into the death of Catherine Carroll and the circumstances surrounding the resulting criminal proceedings against Gregory Parsons, and an investigation into the death of Brenda Young and the circumstances surrounding the resulting criminal proceedings against Randy Druken. Lamer was also asked to inquire as to why Ronald Dalton's appeal of his murder conviction took eight years before it was brought on for a hearing in the Court of Appeal.

== Personal life ==
Born in Montreal, Quebec, Lamer served part-time in the Royal Canadian Artillery reserve from 1950 to 1954 while completing his studies at the Collège de Saint-Laurent and in the Canadian Intelligence Corps from 1954 to 1960. In 1956, he graduated in law from the Université de Montréal and was called to the Bar of Quebec in 1957.

In 1987, he married Danièle Tremblay-Lamer, who was later appointed a judge on the Federal Court.

During his tenure he was well known among the bench to be a frequent consumer of alcohol, especially wine, and have various drug prescriptions to deal with his declining health. Various commentators and even other judges have vocally critiqued these habits of his as reason for him to resign from the court.

Lamer died in Ottawa of a cardiac condition on November 24, 2007, and was entombed at the Notre Dame des Neiges Cemetery in Montreal.

== Recognition ==
He was a Companion of the Order of Canada. He received honorary degrees from the Université de Moncton, University of Ottawa, Université de Montréal, University of Toronto, University of New Brunswick, Dalhousie University, University of British Columbia, and Saint Paul University.

From 1992 to 1998, Chief Justice Lamer was Honorary Lieutenant Colonel of the 62nd (Shawinigan) Field Artillery Regiment, RCA.

Ribbon bars of Antonio Lamer

Coat of arms of Antonio Lamer

Crest
A Coronet rim Argent set alternately with maple leaves Gules and fleurs-de-lys Argent issuant therefrom a demi griffin Azure bearing in its dexter foreclaw an astrolabe Or and in its sinister foreclaw an ansul also Or.
Escutcheon
Quarterly Azure and Argent overall a cross quarterly Argent and Gules in the first and fourth quarters a fleur-de-lys Argent in the second and third a maple leaf Gules.
Supporters
On a grassy mound rising above barry wavy Argent and Azure two hounds Gules semé of ermine spots Argent langed Azure gorged with a coronet fleury Or.
Motto
VIAM INVENIAM AUT FACIAM (Latin for 'I’ll either find a way or make one')

== See also ==
- List of Supreme Court of Canada cases (Lamer Court)
- Reasons of the Supreme Court of Canada by Chief Justice Lamer
- 1987 judgments of the Supreme Court of Canada
- 1988 judgments of the Supreme Court of Canada
- 1989 judgments of the Supreme Court of Canada

Military offices
Preceded by Pierre Bouvette	Honorary Lieutenant Colonel of the 62nd (Shawinigan) Field Artillery Regiment, RCA; 1992–1998	Succeeded by Ben Weider
