= Reasons of the Supreme Court of Canada by Justice Iacobucci =

This is a list of all the opinions written by Frank Iacobucci during his tenure as puisne justice of the Supreme Court of Canada.

== 1999 ==
Case name	Issue	Co-authored by	Joined by
Zink v Graybec Immobilier Inc [1999], 1 SCR 6	Commercial law	XXXX	XXXX
Vancouver Society of Immigrant and Visible Minority Women v MNR [1999] 1 SCR 10	Constitutional law Taxation	XXXX	XXX
Law v Canada (Minister of Employment and Immigration) [1999] 1 SCR 497	Constitutional law – Equality rights under s. 15 of the Charter	XXXX	XXX
MJB Enterprises Ltd v Defence Construction (1951) Ltd [1999] 1 SCR 619 [URL]	Contract – Tendering process	XXXX	XXX
R v Monney [1999] 1 SCR 652 [URL]	Constitutional law; Customs and excise – Unreasonable search and seizure under s. 8 of the Charter	XXXX	XXX
R v Gladue [1999] 1 SCR 688 [URL]	Criminal law – Sentencing of aboriginal offenders	XXXX	XXX
Novak v Bond [1999] 1 SCR 808 [URL]	Action – Limitation of actions	XXXX	XXX
M v H [1999] 2 SCR 3 [URL]	Constitutional law; Family law – Definition of "spouse" and equality rights for same-sex couples under s. 15 of the Charter	Cory	Lamer, L'Heureux-Dubé, McLachlin, Binnie
R v White [1999] 2 SCR 417 [URL]	Constitutional law – Self-incrimination as part of fundamental justice under s. 7 of the Charter	XXXX	XXX
Baker v Canada (Minister of Citizenship and Immigration) [1999] 2 SCR 817 [URL]	[DESCRIPTION]	XXXX	XXX
Delisle v Canada (Deputy AG) [1999] 2 SCR 988 [URL]	[DESCRIPTION]	XXXX	XXX
Allsco Building Products Ltd v United Food and Commercial Workers, Local 1288 [1999] 2 SCR 1136 [URL]	[DESCRIPTION]	XXXX	XXX
Fraser River Pile & Dredge Ltd v Can-Dive Services Ltd [1999] 3 SCR 108 [URL]	[DESCRIPTION]	XXXX	XXX
R v Lance [1999] 3 SCR 658 [URL]	[DESCRIPTION]	XXXX	XXX
R v Fleming [1999] 3 SCR 662 [URL]	[DESCRIPTION]	XXXX	XXX
Guarantee Co of North America v Gordon Capital Corp [1999] 3 SCR 423 [URL]	[DESCRIPTION]	XXXX	XXX
R v Groot [1999] 3 SCR 664 [URL]	[DESCRIPTION]	XXXX	XXX
R v Mills [1999] 3 SCR 668 [URL]	[DESCRIPTION]	XXXX	XXX
65302 British Columbia Ltd v Canada [1999] 3 SCR 804 [URL]	[DESCRIPTION]	XXXX	XXX
R v Pelletier [1999] 3 SCR 863 [URL]	[DESCRIPTION]	XXXX	XXX
R v Terceira [1999] 3 SCR 866 [URL]	[DESCRIPTION]	XXXX	XXX

- Pearlman v Manitoba Law Society Judicial Committee, [1991] 2 SCR 869
- London Drugs Ltd v Kuehne & Nagel International Ltd, [1992] 3 SCR 299
- R v V (KB), [1993] 2 SCR 857
- Adler v Ontario, [1996] 3 SCR 609
- Vriend v Alberta, (1998)
- Re Rizzo & Rizzo Shoes Ltd, [1998] 1 SCR 27

Note: This part of the list is incomplete

== 2000 ==
Case name	Issue	Co-authored by	Joined by
R v Wells; 2000 SCC 10 [URL]	[DESCRIPTION]	XXXX	XXX
Global Securities Corp v British Columbia (Securities Commission); 2000 SCC 21 [URL]	[DESCRIPTION]	XXXX	XXX
Non-Marine Underwriters, Lloyd's of London v Scalera; 2000 SCC 24 [URL]	[DESCRIPTION]	XXXX	XXX
Sansalone v Wawanesa Mutual Insurance Co; 2000 SCC 25 [URL]	[DESCRIPTION]	XXXX	XXX
R v Cacheway; 2000 SCC 33 [URL]	[DESCRIPTION]	XXXX	XXX
Lovelace v Ontario; 2000 SCC 37 [URL]	[DESCRIPTION]	XXXX	XXX
R v Oickle; 2000 SCC 38 [URL]	Criminal law – Admissibility of confessionary evidence	XXXX	Bastarache, Binnie, L'Heureux-Dubé, Major and McLachlin JJ
R v Starr; 2000 SCC 40 [URL]	Criminal law – Admissibility of hearsay evidence	XXXX	Arbour, Binnie, LeBel and Major JJ
R v Beauchamp; 2000 SCC 54 [URL]	Criminal law – Appropriate charge to jury on reasonable doubt standard	XXXX	Gonthier, McLachlin, Bastarache and Binnie JJ
R v Russell; 2000 SCC 55 [URL]	[DESCRIPTION]	XXXX	XXX
R v Knoblauch; 2000 SCC 58 [URL]	[DESCRIPTION]	XXXX	XXX
Martel Building Ltd v Canada; 2000 SCC 60 [URL]	[DESCRIPTION]	XXXX	XXX
Little Sisters Book and Art Emporium v Canada (Minister of Justice); 2000 SCC 69 [URL]	[DESCRIPTION]		Arbour and LeBel JJ

== 2001 ==
Case name	Issue	Co-authored by	Joined by
R v Berntson; 2001 SCC 9 [URL]	[DESCRIPTION]	XXXX	XXX
Backman v Canada; 2001 SCC 10 [URL]	[DESCRIPTION]	XXXX	XXX
Spire Freezers Ltd v Canada; 2001 SCC 11 [URL]	[DESCRIPTION]	XXXX	XXX
Ontario English Catholic Teachers' Association v Ontario (AG); 2001 SCC 15 [URL]	[DESCRIPTION]	XXXX	XXX
R v ZL; 2001 SCC 16 [URL]	[DESCRIPTION]	XXXX	XXX
R v WBC; 2001 SCC 17 [URL]	[DESCRIPTION]	XXXX	XXX
R v Dutra; 2001 SCC 29 [URL]	[DESCRIPTION]	XXXX	XXX
Trinity Western University v British Columbia College of Teachers; 2001 SCC 31 [URL]	[DESCRIPTION]	Bastarache JJ	McLachlin CJ and Arbour, Binnie, Gonthier, LeBel and Major JJ
Committee for the Equal Treatment of Asbestos Minority Shareholders v Ontario (Securities Commission); 2001 SCC 37 [URL]	[DESCRIPTION]	XXXX	XXX
McKinley v BC Tel; 2001 SCC 38 [URL]	[DESCRIPTION]	XXXX	XXX
Monenco Ltd v Commonwealth Insurance Co; 2001 SCC 49 [URL]	[DESCRIPTION]	XXXX	XXX
Berendsen v Ontario; 2001 SCC 55 [URL]	[DESCRIPTION]	XXXX	XXX
R v Ulybel Enterprises Ltd; 2001 SCC 56 [URL]	[DESCRIPTION]	XXXX	XXX
Ludco Enterprises Ltd v Canada; 2001 SCC 62 [URL]	[DESCRIPTION]	XXXX	XXX
R v JWR; 2001 SCC 65 [URL]	[DESCRIPTION]	XXXX	XXX
Proulx v Quebec (AG); 2001 SCC 66 [URL]	[DESCRIPTION]	XXXX	XXX
R v Advance Cutting & Coring Ltd; 2001 SCC 70 [URL]	[DESCRIPTION]	XXXX	XXX
R v Mentuck; 2001 SCC 76 [URL]	[DESCRIPTION]	XXXX	XXX
R v ONE; 2001 SCC 77 [URL]	[DESCRIPTION]	XXXX	XXX
R v Golden; 2001 SCC 83 [URL]	[DESCRIPTION]	XXXX	XXX
Osoyoos Indian Band v Oliver (Town of); 2001 SCC 85 [URL]	[DESCRIPTION]	XXXX	XXX

== 2002 ==
Case name	Issue	Co-authored by	Joined by
Chieu v Canada (Minister of Citizenship and Immigration); 2002 SCC 3 [URL]	[DESCRIPTION]	XXXX	XXX
Al Sagban v Canada (Minister of Citizenship and Immigration); 2002 SCC 4 [URL]	[DESCRIPTION]	XXXX	XXX
R v Tessier; 2002 SCC 6 [URL]	[DESCRIPTION]	XXXX	XXX
Bannon v Thunder Bay (City of); 2002 SCC 20 [URL]	[DESCRIPTION]	XXXX	XXX
Sarvanis v Canada; 2002 SCC 28 [URL]	[DESCRIPTION]	XXXX	XXX
Housen v Nikolaisen; 2002 SCC 33 [URL]	[DESCRIPTION]	XXXX	XXX
R v VCAS; 2002 SCC 36 [URL]	[DESCRIPTION]	XXXX	XXX
Berry v Pulley; 2002 SCC 40 [URL]	[DESCRIPTION]	XXXX	XXX
Sierra Club of Canada v Canada (Minister of Finance); 2002 SCC 41 [URL]	[DESCRIPTION]	XXXX	XXX
Bell Express Vu Limited Partnership v Rex; 2002 SCC 42 [URL]	[DESCRIPTION]	XXXX	XXX
R v Robicheau; 2002 SCC 45 [URL]	[DESCRIPTION]	XXXX	XXX
Stewart v Canada; 2002 SCC 46 [URL]	[DESCRIPTION]	XXXX	XXX
Wells v Canada; 2002 SCC 47 [URL]	[DESCRIPTION]	XXXX	XXX
First Vancouver Finance v MRN; 2002 SCC 49 [URL]	[DESCRIPTION]	XXXX	XXX
Heredi v Fensom; 2002 SCC 50 [URL]	[DESCRIPTION]	XXXX	XXX
Somersall v Friedman; 2002 SCC 59 [URL]	[DESCRIPTION]	XXXX	XXX
R v Hall; 2002 SCC 64 [URL]	[DESCRIPTION]	XXXX	Arbour, LeBel and Major JJ
Krieger v Law Society of Alberta; 2002 SCC 65 [URL]	[DESCRIPTION]	XXXX	XXX
B v Ontario (Human Rights Commission); 2002 SCC 66 [URL]	[DESCRIPTION]	XXXX	XXX
R v Jarvis; 2002 SCC 73 [URL]	[DESCRIPTION]	XXXX	XXX
R v Ling; 2002 SCC 74 [URL]	[DESCRIPTION]	XXXX	XXX
R v Harvey; 2002 SCC 80 [URL]	[DESCRIPTION]	XXXX	XXX
R v Squires; 2002 SCC 82 [URL]	[DESCRIPTION]	XXXX	XXX

== 2003 ==
Case name	Issue	Co-authored by	Joined by
R v RR; 2003 SCC 4 [URL]	XXXXXX	XXXX	XXXX
R v Harriott; 2003 SCC 5 [URL]	[DESCRIPTION]	XXXX	XXX
R v MS; 2003 SCC 11 [URL]	[DESCRIPTION]	XXXX	XXX
R v Allen; 2003 SCC 18 [URL]	[DESCRIPTION]	XXXX	XXX
Law Society of New Brunswick v Ryan; 2003 SCC 20 [URL]	[DESCRIPTION]	XXXX	XXX
Figueroa v Canada (AG); 2003 SCC 37 [URL]	[DESCRIPTION]	XXXX	McLachlin CJ and Arbour, Bastarache, Binnie and Major JJ
Wewaykum Indian Band v Canada; 2003 SCC 45 [URL]	Disqualification of judges on basis of bias	XXXX	XXX
R v Johnson; 2003 SCC 46 [URL]	[DESCRIPTION]	Arbour J	McLachlin CJ and Gonthier, Major, Bastarache, Binnie, LeBel and Deschamps JJ
R v Edgar; 2003 SCC 47 [URL]	[DESCRIPTION]	Arbour J	McLachlin CJ and Gonthier, Major, Bastarache, Binnie, LeBel and Deschamps JJ
R v Smith; 2003 SCC 48 [URL]	[DESCRIPTION]	Arbour J	McLachlin CJ and Gonthier, Major, Bastarache, Binnie, LeBel and Deschamps JJ
R v Mitchell; 2003 SCC 49 [URL]	Sentencing of dangerous and long-term offenders	Arbour J	McLachlin CJ and Gonthier, Major, Bastarache, Binnie, LeBel and Deschamps JJ
R v Kelly; 2003 SCC 50 [URL]	Sentencing of dangerous and long-term offenders	Arbour J	McLachlin CJ and Gonthier, Major, Bastarache, Binnie, LeBel and Deschamps JJ
Gurniak v Nordquist; 2003 SCC 59 [URL]	Insurance		Major, Bastarache, Binnie, Arbour, LeBel and Deschamps JJ
Deloitte & Touche LLP v Ontario (Securities Commission); 2003 SCC 61 [URL]	Securities		McLachlin CJ and Gonthier, Major, Bastarache, Binnie, Arbour, LeBel and Deschamps JJ
Doucet-Boudreau v Nova Scotia (Minister of Education); 2003 SCC 62	Appeal; Constitutional law	Arbour J	McLachlin CJ and Gonthier and Bastarache JJ
Odhavji Estate v Woodhouse; 2003 SCC 69	Action; Civil procedure; Torts		McLachlin CJ and Gonthier, Major, Bastarache, Binnie, Arbour, LeBel and Deschamps JJ

== 2004 ==
Case name	Issue	Co-authored by	Joined by
Garland v Consumers' Gas Co; 2004 SCC 25 [URL]	Action – Restitution and unjust enrichment		Major, Bastarache, Binnie, LeBel, Deschamps and Fish JJ
Alberta Union of Provincial Employees v Lethbridge Community College; 2004 SCC 28 [URL]	Administrative law; Labour law – Scope of labour arbitration board's remedial jurisdiction		McLachlin CJ and Major, Bastarache, Binnie, Arbour, LeBel, Deschamps and Fish JJ
Application under s 83.28 of the Criminal Code (Re); 2004 SCC 42 [URL]	[DESCRIPTION]	Arbour J	McLachlin CJ and Major, Binnie and Fish JJ
Vancouver Sun (Re); 2004 SCC 43 [URL]	Criminal law	Arbour J	McLachlin CJ and Binnie, Fish and Major JJ
R v Demers; 2004 SCC 46 [URL]	Constitutional law – Division of powers	Bastarache J	McLachlin CJ and Major, Binnie, Arbour, Deschamps and Fish JJ
Syndicat Northcrest v Amselem; 2004 SCC 47 [URL]	Constitutional law – Freedom of religion		McLachlin CJ and Arbour, Fish and Major JJ
R v Mann; 2004 SCC 52 [URL]	Constitutional law; Criminal law; Professional law – Search and seizure		Binnie, Fish, LeBel and Major JJ
