= Mounted Police Association of Ontario v Canada =

2015 Canadian Charter/labour law case

Mounted Police Association of Ontario v Canada (Attorney General)
- Supreme Court of Canada

Hearing: February 18, 2014 Judgment: January 16, 2015
- Citations: [2015] 1 SCR 3, 2015 SCC 1
- Prior history: On appeal from the Court of Appeal for Ontario
- Ruling: Appeal allowed

Holding
- Substantial interference with the right to collective bargaining infringes section 2(d) of the Charter

Court membership
- Chief Justice: McLachlin CJ
- Puisne Justices: LeBel, Abella, Rothstein, Cromwell, Karakatsanis and Wagner JJ

Reasons given
- Majority: McLachlin CJ and LeBel J, joined by Abella, Cromwell, Karakatsanis and Wagner JJ
- Dissent: Rothstein J

Laws applied
- Canadian Charter of Rights and Freedoms, Section 2(d)

Mounted Police Association of Ontario v Canada [2015] 1 S.C.R. 3, 2015 SCC 1 is a leading Canadian labour law case concerning freedom of association under section 2(d) of the Canadian Charter of Rights and Freedoms. The Court concluded that the exclusion of Royal Canadian Mounted Police officers from unionization and collective bargaining was unconstitutional, overruling Delisle v Canada (Deputy Attorney General). Along with Saskatchewan Federation of Labour v Saskatchewan and Meredith v Canada (Attorney General), the decision in MPAO represented a significant evolution in the interpretation of section 2(d), clarifying the legal standard applicable under that provision.

== Background ==
MPAO was decided against the backdrop of the Court's earlier ruling in Delisle. In that decision, the Court affirmed the constitutionality of laws excluding RCMP officers from collective bargaining.

In the years after Delisle, the Court expanded the scope of section 2(d): in Health Services and Support — Facilities Subsector Bargaining Assn. v. British Columbia, a majority of the Court recognized a constitutional right of employees to access collective bargaining. "Substantial interference" with that right was found to infringe section 2(d). However, in Ontario (Attorney General) v. Fraser, the Court assessed the challenged law on a standard of "substantial impossibility": a law would not violate section 2(d) unless it "has the effect of making it impossible to act collectively to achieve workplace goals."

At issue in MPAO were federal labour laws governing public sector employees. One of the challenged laws excluded RCMP officers from the definition of "employees" for purposes of collective bargaining. The other law, a regulation enacted under the RCMP Act, provided a mechanism for employees to raise labour relations issues, but limited employee representation to a single organization, and did not provide for actual collective bargaining. The laws were challenged by the Mounted Police Association of Ontario, an association representing RCMP officers in that province.

== Procedural history ==
At trial, the Ontario Superior Court of Justice allowed the claim in part, applying the "substantial interference" test and concluding that the regulation in question breached section 2(d) of the Charter in a manner that could not be justified under section 1. The regulation was found to be invalid and of no force and effect under section 52 of the Constitution Act, 1982. The Attorney General of Canada appealed the finding of invalidity, and the MPAO cross-appealed. The Court of Appeal for Ontario unanimously reversed the trial ruling, applying the "impossibility" test articulated in Fraser and finding no breach of section 2(d).

The MPAO, joined by the British Columbia Mounted Police Professional Association, was granted leave to appeal to the Supreme Court of Canada.

== Judgment ==
A majority of the Supreme Court of Canada, encompassing six of seven justices, allowed the appeal and struck down both laws in question. The majority opinion sought to "clarify the scope of the constitutional protection of collective bargaining" recognized in BC Health Services and Fraser.

The Court summarized section 2(d) protections as follows:

In summary, s. 2(d), viewed purposively, protects three classes of activities: (1) the right to join with others and form associations; (2) the right to join with others in the pursuit of other constitutional rights; and (3) the right to join with others to meet on more equal terms the power and strength of other groups or entities.

The Court did not explicitly state that Fraser was overruled, instead reasoning that the "impossibility" referred to in that case described the effects of the law at issue, not the legal standard for finding a breach. The Court clarified that "substantial interference" was the governing test for infringement of freedom of association, and that both of the challenged laws resulted in such interference. The Charter was found to protect employees' right to choose their own bargaining agent, independent of management.

The Court went on to consider whether the infringement could be justified under section 1 of the Charter. The Court concluded that the government's objective in passing the law was pressing and substantial. However, the law failed both steps of the proportionality analysis: it was not rationally connected to the government's objective, and it was not minimally impairing.

Justice Rothstein dissented. He pointed to the principle of stare decisis, arguing that the majority failed to justify its departure from recent precedent (i.e., Fraser). He concluded that the majority decision overturned Fraser, emphasizing the repeated references to "impossibility" in that case. Applying the "effective or substantial impossibility" standard, Rothstein J found no violation of section 2(d); in obiter, he commented that any infringement would have been justified under section 1.

== Legacy and subsequent developments ==
In the weeks after MPAO was decided, the Court rendered its decision in Saskatchewan Federation, concluding that the right to strike is constitutionally protected.

MPAO, Saskatchewan Federation, and Meredith have been described as a "new trilogy" of Canadian labour cases, in reference to the Court's 1987 decisions regarding section 2(d) (including the Reference Re Public Service Employee Relations Act (Alberta)). MPAO was regarded as an expansion of associational rights: the Court "explicitly adopted an expansive and purposive approach to interpreting freedom of association, drawing from Chief Justice Dickson's dissenting reasons in the Alberta Reference."

== See also ==
- List of Supreme Court of Canada cases (McLachlin Court)
- Canadian labour law
- Police union
