= Delisle v Canada (Deputy AG) =

- Supreme Court of Canada

Hearing: October 7, 1998 Judgment: September 2, 1999
- Citations: [1999] 2 SCR 989
- Docket No.: 25926
- Ruling: Delisle appeal dismissed

Court membership
- Chief Justice: Antonio Lamer; Puisne Justices: Claire L'Heureux-Dubé, Charles Gonthier, Peter Cory, Beverley McLachlin, Frank Iacobucci, John C. Major, Michel Bastarache, Ian Binnie

Reasons given
- Majority: Bastarache, joined by Gonthier, McLachlin and Major
- Concurrence: L'Heureux-Dubé
- Dissent: Cory and Iacobucci
- Superseded by
- Health Services and Support – Facilities Subsector Bargaining Assn. v British Columbia
- Overruled by
- Mounted Police Association of Ontario v Canada (Attorney General)

Delisle v Canada (Deputy AG), [1999] 2 SCR 989 is a Supreme Court of Canada decision on the freedom of association guarantee under section 2(d) of the Canadian Charter of Rights and Freedoms. The Court defined the freedom as only applying to individuals and not associations themselves. Accordingly, they found the exclusion of the Royal Canadian Mounted Police (RCMP) from the public services legislation did not violate section 2(d).

Gaétan Delisle was a member of the RCMP and president of an RCMP labour association. He brought a challenge to the federal Public Service Staff Relations Act (PSSRA) and part of the Canada Labour Code on the grounds it violated his right to association.

Bastarache J, writing for the majority, held that the PSSRA did not violate the Charter because it did not affect members of the RCMP from forming their own independent associations. He further ruled that, "The fundamental freedoms protected by s. 2 of the Charter do not impose a positive obligation of protection or inclusion on Parliament or the government, except perhaps in exceptional circumstances which are not at issue here."

Much of the holding in this case was superseded by Health Services and Support – Facilities Subsector Bargaining Assn. v British Columbia, and the decision was ultimately overruled by Mounted Police Association of Ontario v Canada (Attorney General).

== See also ==
- List of Supreme Court of Canada cases (Lamer Court)
- Dunmore v Ontario (AG) (2001)
