= Dr Q v College of Physicians and Surgeons of British Columbia =

- Supreme Court of Canada

Hearing: October 2, 2002 Judgment: April 3, 2003
- Citations: [2003] 1 S.C.R. 226, 2003 SCC 19
- Docket No.: 28553
- Ruling: Appeal allowed

Court membership
- Chief Justice: Beverley McLachlin; Puisne Justices: Charles Gonthier, Frank Iacobucci, John C. Major, Michel Bastarache, Ian Binnie, Louise Arbour, Louis LeBel, Marie Deschamps

Reasons given
- Unanimous reasons by: McLachlin C.J.

Dr Q v College of Physicians and Surgeons of British Columbia, 2003 SCC 19, [2003] 1 S.C.R. 226 is a leading decision of the Supreme Court of Canada in Canadian administrative law.

== Background ==
Dr. Q was brought before the Discipline Committee of the British Columbia College of Physicians and Surgeons for having sexual relations with a patient. The patient had originally sought help in 1994 for depression. By 1995 the two began sexual relations. Dr. Q denied any misconduct. The Committee found that Dr. Q was guilty of infamous misconduct. The Committee based its decision on the weight of the patient's testimony, ignoring Dr. Q's testimony.

The Committee applied a standard of "clear and cogent evidence". Dr. Q applied for judicial review of the decision arguing that the wrong standard was applied.

== Decision ==
Chief Justice McLachlin, writing for the Court, allowed the appeal and reinstated the order. She found that the standard of "clear and cogent evidence" was the appropriate standard.

On the issue of standard of review, McLachlin reiterated the three degrees of deference available, correctness, reasonableness simpliciter,and patent unreasonableness. She considered what degree of deference was required in these circumstances based on the four factors of the "pragmatic and functional approach". On the whole, the Committee decisions were to be reviewed on a standard of "reasonableness". Under the reasonableness standard, the reviewing judge's view of the evidence is beside the point. Instead, the court should only ask whether there is some basis in evidence to support the conclusion.

== See also ==
- List of Supreme Court of Canada cases (McLachlin Court)
- List of Supreme Court of Canada cases
- Law Society of New Brunswick v. Ryan, 2003 SCC 20: companion case
