= Health Services and Support – Facilities Subsector Bargaining Assn. v British Columbia =

Canadian labour law case

Health Services and Support - Facilities Subsector Bargaining Assn. v British Columbia
- Supreme Court of Canada

Hearing: February 8, 2006 Judgment: June 8, 2007
- Citations: [2007] 2 SCR 391, 2007 SCC 27
- Prior history: On appeal from the British Columbia Court of Appeal
- Ruling: Appeal allowed in part

Holding
- Freedom of association guaranteed by section 2(d) of the Charter includes a procedural right to collective bargaining. Section 2(d) is infringed by laws that seriously undercut or undermine the activity of workers joining together to pursue the common goals of negotiating workplace conditions and terms of employment with their employer.

Court membership
- Chief Justice: McLachlin CJ
- Puisne Justices: Bastarache, Binnie, LeBel, Deschamps, Fish and Abella JJ

Reasons given
- Majority: McLachlin CJ and LeBel J, joined by Bastarache, Binnie, Fish, and Abella JJ
- Dissent: Deschamps J

Laws applied
- Canadian Charter of Rights and Freedoms, section 2(d)

Health Services and Support – Facilities Subsector Bargaining Assn. v British Columbia [2007] 2 SCR 391, 2007 SCC 27 is a landmark Canadian labour law case concerning freedom of association under section 2(d) of the Canadian Charter of Rights and Freedoms. A majority of the Supreme Court of Canada determined that the Charter protects a meaningful process of collective bargaining.

== Background ==
In 1987, the Supreme Court of Canada decided the Reference Re Public Service Employee Relations Act (Alta.), [1987] 1 SCR 313. The majority opinion in the Alberta Reference indicated that collective bargaining was not protected by s. 2 of the Charter.

== Facts ==
At issue was the constitutionality of Part 2 of the Health and Social Services Delivery Improvement Act, SBC 2002, c 2, enacted by the government of British Columbia. The Act purported to modify existing collective agreements: as described by the majority of the Supreme Court of Canada, "Part 2 gave health care employers greater flexibility to organize their relations with their employees as they see fit, and in some cases, to do so in ways that would not have been permissible under existing collective agreements and without adhering to requirements of consultation and notice that would otherwise obtain. It invalidated important provisions of collective agreements then in force, and effectively precluded meaningful collective bargaining on a number of specific issues."

== Judgment ==
The majority concluded that sections 6(2), 6(4) and 9 of the British Columbia Act infringe section 2(d) of the Charter in a manner that could not be justified under section 1.

The majority held that "the concept of freedom of association under s. 2(d) of the Charter includes [the] notion of a procedural right to collective bargaining." While this right does not "ensure a particular outcome in a labour dispute, or guarantee access to any particular statutory regime", the court affirmed "the right of employees to associate in a process of collective action to achieve workplace goals." Government action that "substantially interferes" with this right violates section 2(d) of the Charter and requires justification under section 1.

The majority also made use of international law as an interpretive aid. Specifically, the majority relied on the International Covenant on Economic, Social and Cultural Rights, the International Covenant on Civil and Political Rights, and the International Labour Organization's Freedom of Association and Protection of the Right to Organise Convention. At paragraph 69, the court stated that "Canada’s international obligations can assist courts charged with interpreting the Charter's guarantees".

== Subsequent developments ==
In Saskatchewan Federation of Labour v Saskatchewan, the Supreme Court of Canada overruled the Alberta Reference. In Saskatchewan Federation, the Court expanded on its holding in BC Health Services, holding that the Charter protects not only the right to bargain collectively, but also the right to strike.

== See also ==
- List of Supreme Court of Canada cases (McLachlin Court)
- Canadian labour law
- Saskatchewan Federation of Labour v Saskatchewan
