= Fraser River Pile & Dredge Ltd v Can-Dive Services Ltd =

- Supreme Court of Canada

Hearing: Argued February 25, 1999 Judgment: September 10, 1999
- Citations: [1999] 3 SCR 108; (1999), 176 DLR (4th) 257; [1999] 9 WWR 380; (1999), 50 BLR (2d) 169; (1999), 67 BCLR (3d) 213
- Docket No.: 26415

Holding
- Extended the "principled exception" to the doctrine of privity of contract for third party beneficiaries.

Court membership
- Chief Justice: Antonio Lamer; Puisne Justices: Claire L'Heureux-Dubé, Charles Gonthier, Peter Cory, Beverley McLachlin, Frank Iacobucci, John C. Major, Michel Bastarache, Ian Binnie

Reasons given
- Unanimous reasons by: Iacobucci J
- Lamer CJ and L'Heureux-Dubé J took no part in the consideration or decision of the case.

Fraser River Pile & Dredge Ltd v Can-Dive Services Ltd, [1999] 3 SCR 108 is a leading Supreme Court of Canada decision where the court re-affirmed and expanded on the exception to the doctrine of privity first established in London Drugs Ltd v Kuehne & Nagel International Ltd, [1992] SCR 299.

== Background ==
Fraser River Pile & Dredge Ltd. ("Fraser River") owned a derrick barge "Sceptre Squamish", that it chartered to Can-Dive Services Ltd. ("Can-Dive"). Can-Dive accidentally sank the barge while it was chartered. Fraser River collected on a $1.1 million insurance policy for the barge. The original policy between Fraser River and its insurer contained a subrogation clause which waived the insurer's right of subrogation against any third parties. Fraser River and its insurer entered an agreement which waived the original subrogation waiver, intending to allow the insurance company and Fraser River to sue Can-Dive.

In its defence, Can-Dive claimed the insurer already waived its subrogation rights and so could not unwaive them.

The question before the Supreme Court was whether Can-Dive could rely on the waiver of subrogation in the original insurance policy.

== Reasons of the court ==
Justice Iacobucci, writing for a unanimous court, held in favour of Can-Dive on the basis it was able to rely on the subrogation clause. The case turned on the existence of any exceptions to privity. Iacobucci first affirmed the existence of an agency exception to privity, and then expanded on the "principled exception to the privity of contract doctrine" established in London Drugs Ltd v Kuehne & Nagel International Ltd.

He noted that in cases where the agency exception did not apply, as in this case, courts "may nonetheless undertake the appropriate analysis, bounded by both common sense and commercial reality, in order to determine whether the doctrine of privity with respect to third-party beneficiaries should be relaxed". This principled approached, he believed, was preferable to having "yet another ad hoc exception".

A two-stage test was devised to determine if the exception could be applied: "(a) Did the parties to the contract intend to extend the benefit in question to the third party seeking to rely on the contractual provision? and (b) Are the activities performed by the third party seeking to rely on the contractual provision the very activities contemplated as coming within the scope of the contract in general, or the provision in particular, again as determined by reference to the intentions of the parties?" (see decision at para 31)

Iacobucci acknowledged this exception was a departure from the doctrine of privity. However, it was only "incremental" in nature and did not abdicate any existing principles. Since the exception was dependent on the intention within the contract, it would not frustrate the expectations of the parties to the contract.

On the facts, Iacobucci found the policy was clearly intending to extend a benefit to Can-Dive satisfying the first stage. It was noted that parties to a contract cannot unilaterally revoke the rights of a third party once they have received an actual benefit. On the second stage, the requirements were easily satisfied since Can-Dive was acting in accordance with the charter agreement.
