= Reference Re Public Service Employee Relations Act (Alta) =

Judgement of the Supreme Court of Canada

Reference Re Public Service Employee Relations Act (Alta.)
- Supreme Court of Canada

Hearing: June 27-28, 1985 Judgment: April 9, 1987
- Citations: [1987] 1 SCR 313
- Prior history: On appeal from the Court of Appeal of Alberta
- Ruling: Appeal dismissed

Court membership
- Chief Justice: Brian Dickson; Puisne Justices: Jean Beetz, Willard Estey, William McIntyre, Julien Chouinard, Antonio Lamer, Bertha Wilson, Gerald Le Dain, Gérard La Forest

Reasons given
- Plurality: Le Dain (Beetz and La Forest concurring)
- Concurrence: McIntyre
- Dissent: Dickson (Wilson concurring)
- Chouinard did not participate in the final disposition of the judgment.

Laws applied
- Canadian Charter of Rights and Freedoms, section 2(d)
- Superseded by
- Dunmore v Ontario (AG)
- Overruled by
- Saskatchewan Federation of Labour v Saskatchewan

Reference Re Public Service Employee Relations Act (Alta) [1987] 1 S.C.R. 313 is a decision of the Supreme Court of Canada on the right to freedom of association under section 2(d) of the Canadian Charter of Rights and Freedoms. The Court held that section 2(d) did not include the right to strike. In 2015, the Supreme Court overruled its decision in this case, with the Court recognizing a right to strike in the Charter.

== Background ==
Section 2 of the Canadian Charter of Rights and Freedoms entered into force in 1982. The reference provided the Supreme Court of Canada with an opportunity to interpret the scope of protection afforded to collective bargaining and strikes under the Charter.

The province of Alberta referred a reference question to the Alberta Court of Appeal, which was decided in favour of the Government of Alberta. The reference questions concerned Alberta labour relations legislation affecting public service employees, firefighters, hospital employees, and police officers. The laws restricted the right to strike: any impasse in collective bargaining had to be referred to compulsory arbitration. As well, the laws designated certain factors that had to be considered in said arbitration, and limited the scope of issues that were arbitrable.

The appellants, various public sector labour unions, were granted leave to appeal to the Supreme Court of Canada.

== Decision of the Court ==
Justice McIntyre argued that freedom of association is an individual right, intended to protect collective activities that are already protected by other constitutional rights. Thus, activities that are prohibited individually are also forbidden collectively. As such, a trade union does not have a Charter right to strike incident to collective bargaining.

The plurality reasons (written by Justice Le Dain) spanned only three paragraphs, and agreed with Justice McIntyre's disposition. The plurality referred to the many types of associations that the Charter is intended to protect, and the importance of freedom of association, but also emphasized the importance of judicial restraint.

Chief Justice Dickson, in dissent, also agreed with the characterization of the freedom, but argued that the right is not associated with particular activities but rather is "a freedom of persons to join and act with others in common pursuits".

== Subsequent developments ==
In 2001, the Supreme Court decided Dunmore v Ontario (Attorney General), which rejected a strictly individualized approach to section 2(d) reflected in the majority reasons of the reference. The SCC in Dunmore acknowledged that section 2(d) reflects collective, not just individual, rights, and found that substantial interference with the ability of workers to engage in "collective action" would infringe section 2(d).

The Supreme Court expressly overruled its decision in this case in Saskatchewan Federation of Labour v Saskatchewan, with a majority of the SCC recognizing a constitutionally-protected right to strike under section 2(d) of the Charter. The majority decision in that case specifically referred to Chief Justice Dickson's dissenting reasons in this case.

== See also ==
- Canadian labour law
- List of Supreme Court of Canada cases (Dickson Court)
