= Saskatchewan Federation of Labour v Saskatchewan =

- Supreme Court of Canada

Hearing: 16 May 2014 Judgment: 30 January 2015
- Citations: [2015] 1 SCR 245, 2015 SCC 4
- Docket No.: 35423
- Ruling: Appeal with respect to the Public Service Essential Services Act allowed; appeal with respect to The Trade Union Amendment Act, 2008 dismissed

Court membership
- Chief Justice: Beverley McLachlin; Puisne Justices: Louis LeBel, Rosalie Abella, Marshall Rothstein, Thomas Cromwell, Michael Moldaver, Andromache Karakatsanis, Richard Wagner

Reasons given
- Majority: Abella, joined by McLachlin, LeBel, Cromwell, and Karakatsanis
- Concur/dissent: Rothstein and Wagner
- Moldaver took no part in the consideration or decision of the case.

Saskatchewan Federation of Labour v Saskatchewan [2015] S.C.R., 2015 SCC 4 is a Canadian labour law case on the right to strike.

== Facts ==
The Saskatchewan Federation of Labour and a group of other unions claimed that two new provincial statutes violated the Canadian Charter of Rights and Freedoms by suppressing the freedom to take collective action and collective bargaining. The government of Saskatchewan introduced Public Service Essential Services Act 2008, which would have unilaterally designated public sector workers' services as "essential" and therefore prohibited strike action. The new Trade Union Amendment Act, 2008 increased the level of employee support required to unionize, thereby making it more difficult to organize a union.

== Judgment ==
The Supreme Court of Canada held that the Public Service Essential Services Act 2008 was an unwarranted interference with the right to strike and the right to collective bargaining, as previously elaborated in Health Services and Support – Facilities Subsector Bargaining Assn. v British Columbia and Mounted Police Association of Ontario v Canada (Attorney General). It was unconstitutional and violated the Canadian Charter section 2(d) because it left a determination of what was essential up to the employer. The Trade Union Amendment Act 2008 was lawful even though it made union organizing more difficult. Rosalie Abella gave the leading judgment, saying the following:

3 The conclusion that the right to strike is an essential part of a meaningful collective bargaining process in our system of labour relations is supported by history, by jurisprudence, and by Canada's international obligations. As Otto Kahn-Freund and Bob Hepple recognized:

The power to withdraw their labour is for the workers what for management is its power to shut down production, to switch it to different purposes, to transfer it to different places. A legal system which suppresses the freedom to strike puts the workers at the mercy of their employers. This — in all its simplicity — is the essence of the matter. (Laws Against Strikes (1972), at p. 8)

The right to strike is not merely derivative of collective bargaining, it is an indispensable component of that right. It seems to me to be the time to give this conclusion constitutional benediction.

4 This applies too to public sector employees. Those public sector employees who provide essential services undoubtedly have unique functions which may argue for a less disruptive mechanism when collective bargaining reaches an impasse, but they do not argue for no mechanism at all. Because Saskatchewan's legislation abrogates the right to strike for a number of employees and provides no such alternative mechanism, it is unconstitutional.

[...]

53 In Health Services, this Court recognized that the Charter values of "[h]uman dignity, equality, liberty, respect for the autonomy of the person and the enhancement of democracy" supported protecting the right to a meaningful process of collective bargaining within the scope of s. 2(d) (para. 81). And, most recently, drawing on these same values, in Mounted Police it confirmed that protection for a meaningful process of collective bargaining requires that employees have the ability to pursue their goals and that, at its core, s. 2(d) aims

to protect the individual from "state-enforced isolation in the pursuit of his or her ends" . . . . The guarantee functions to protect individuals against more powerful entities. By banding together in the pursuit of common goals, individuals are able to prevent more powerful entities from thwarting their legitimate goals and desires. In this way, the guarantee of freedom of association empowers vulnerable groups and helps them work to right imbalances in society. It protects marginalized groups and makes possible a more equal society. [para. 58]

54 The right to strike is essential to realizing these values and objectives through a collective bargaining process because it permits workers to withdraw their labour in concert when collective bargaining reaches an impasse. Through a strike, workers come together to participate directly in the process of determining their wages, working conditions and the rules that will govern their working lives (Fudge and Tucker, at p. 334). The ability to strike thereby allows workers, through collective action, to refuse to work under imposed terms and conditions. This collective action at the moment of impasse is an affirmation of the dignity and autonomy of employees in their working lives.

55 Striking — the "powerhouse" of collective bargaining — also promotes equality in the bargaining process: England, at p. 188. This Court has long recognized the deep inequalities that structure the relationship between employers and employees, and the vulnerability of employees in this context. In the Alberta Reference, Dickson C.J. observed that

[t]he role of association has always been vital as a means of protecting the essential needs and interests of working people. Throughout history, workers have associated to overcome their vulnerability as individuals to the strength of their employers. [p. 368]

And this Court affirmed in Mounted Police that

. . . s. 2(d) functions to prevent individuals, who alone may be powerless, from being overwhelmed by more powerful entities, while also enhancing their strength through the exercise of collective power. Nowhere are these dual functions of s. 2(d) more pertinent than in labour relations. Individual employees typically lack the power to bargain and pursue workplace goals with their more powerful employers. Only by banding together in collective bargaining associations, thus strengthening their bargaining power with their employer, can they meaningfully pursue their workplace goals. The right to a meaningful process of collective bargaining is therefore a necessary element of the right to collectively pursue workplace goals in a meaningful way . . . . [The] process of collective bargaining will not be meaningful if it denies employees the power to pursue their goals. [paras. 70-71]

Judy Fudge and Eric Tucker point out that it is "the possibility of the strike which enables workers to negotiate with their employers on terms of approximate equality" (p. 333). Without it, "bargaining risks being inconsequential — a dead letter" (Prof. Michael Lynk, "Expert Opinion on Essential Services", at par. 20; A.R., vol. III, at p. 145).

56 In their dissent, my colleagues suggest that s. 2(d) should not protect strike activity as part of a right to a meaningful process of collective bargaining because "true workplace justice looks at the interests of all implicated parties" (para. 125), including employers. In essentially attributing equivalence between the power of employees and employers, this reasoning, with respect, turns labour relations on its head, and ignores the fundamental power imbalance which the entire history of modern labour legislation has been scrupulously devoted to rectifying. It drives us inevitably to Anatole France's aphoristic fallacy: "The law, in its majestic equality, forbids the rich as well as the poor to sleep under bridges, to beg in the streets, and to steal bread."

57 Strike activity itself does not guarantee that a labour dispute will be resolved in any particular manner, or that it will be resolved at all. And, as the trial judge recognized, strike action has the potential to place pressure on both sides of a dispute to engage in good faith negotiations. But what it does permit is the employees' ability to engage in negotiations with an employer on a more equal footing (see Williams v. Aristocratic Restaurants (1947) Ltd., 1951 CanLII 24 (SCC), [1951] S.C.R. 762, at p. 780; Mounted Police, at paras. 70-71).

Beverley McLachlin, Louis LeBel, Thomas Cromwell, and Andromache Karakatsanis concurred.

Marshall Rothstein and Richard Wagner dissented in part.

== See also ==
- List of Supreme Court of Canada cases (McLachlin Court)
