= Law Society of New Brunswick v Ryan =

- Supreme Court of Canada

Hearing: October 1, 2002 Judgment: April 3, 2003
- Citations: 2003 SCC 20
- Docket No.: 28639
- Ruling: Appeal allowed, order restored

Court membership
- Chief Justice: Beverley McLachlin; Puisne Justices: Charles Gonthier, Frank Iacobucci, John C. Major, Michel Bastarache, Ian Binnie, Louise Arbour, Louis LeBel, Marie Deschamps

Reasons given
- Unanimous reasons by: Iacobucci J.

Law Society of New Brunswick v Ryan, 2003 SCC 20 is a leading decision of the Supreme Court of Canada on judicial review for professional disciplinary bodies in Canadian administrative law. The Court determined that decisions of professional disciplinary committees are reviewed on a standard of reasonableness simpliciter.

== Background ==
Michael Ryan was found lying to clients about the progress of their cases. Ryan was put to the Discipline Committee of the Law Society of New Brunswick. In his defence he argued that he was suffering from psychological and health problems which drove him to his actions. The committee disbarred him.

Ryan appealed to the New Brunswick Court of Appeal which ordered a new hearing with medical evidence. In the second hearing, Ryan was disbarred again. He appealed again to the Court of Appeal who set aside the committee's decision.

The Supreme Court of Canada was asked to consider the standard of review that should be applied by the courts to disciplinary bodies and consider whether Ryan's disbarment should be set aside.

== Decision ==
Iacobucci, writing for the Court, allowed the appeal and restored the order for disbarment. The Court held that the proper standard of review is reasonableness simpliciter. On application of the standard, the order of disbarment was found to be reasonable.

On the issue of standard of review, Ryan had argued for a lower standard of review that was closer to correctness. The New Brunswick Court of Appeal had agreed with this contention and ruled that "on the spectrum this standard [of reasonableness] is closer to correctness than patently unreasonable." The court rejected this view and emphasized that there can only three standards of review. Furthermore, the court noted that these standards do not "float" along a spectrum of standards of review, but are instead fixed standards that exist along a spectrum of deference.

A standard of reasonableness was based primarily on the expertise of the committee. The committee was composed of lawyers who understood the interest and were fulfilling the mandate of protecting the public.

Iacobucci was critical of the Court of Appeal's consideration of the accuracy and correctness of the committee's decisions. On a standard of reasonableness the reviewing court should not be re-weighing the evidence or re-trying the case. The standard inquiry involves asking whether "after a somewhat probing examination, can the reasons given, when taken as a whole, support the decision?". This is so because "there will often be no single right answer to the questions that are under review against the standard of reasonableness. For example, when a decision must be taken according to a set of objectives that exist in tension with each other, there may be no particular trade-off that is superior to all others."

== See also ==
- List of Supreme Court of Canada cases
- Dr. Q v. College of Physicians and Surgeons of British Columbia 2003 SCC 19 (companion case)
