= Dunmore v Ontario (AG) =

2001 Canadian Supreme Court decision on freedom of association

- Supreme Court of Canada

Hearing: February 19, 2001 Judgment: December 20, 2001
- Full case name: United Food and Commercial Workers International Union v. Attorney General for Ontario and Fleming Chicks
- Citations: 2001 SCC 94, [2001] 3 SCR 1016

Court membership
- Chief Justice: Beverley McLachlin; Puisne Justices: Claire L'Heureux-Dubé, Charles Gonthier, Frank Iacobucci, John C. Major, Michel Bastarache, Ian Binnie, Louise Arbour, Louis LeBel

Reasons given
- Majority: Bastarache J, joined by McLachlin CJ and Gonthier, Iacobucci, Binnie, Arbour and LeBel JJ
- Concurrence: L'Heureux‑Dubé J
- Dissent: Major J

Dunmore v Ontario (AG) [2001] 3 S.C.R. 1016, 2001 SCC 94 is a leading Supreme Court of Canada decision on the constitutional right to freedom of association under section 2(d) of the Canadian Charter of Rights and Freedoms ("Charter"). The Court held that the lack of a positive framework that protected farm workers from employer reprisals for exercising their associational rights under the Charter constituted a "substantial interference" of their right to freedom of association. The Ontario government responded with the Agricultural Employees Protection Act, which extended only to agricultural workers and prohibited employer reprisals against employees exercising their rights under section 2(d) of the Charter.

== Background ==
In 1994, the Ontario government under the New Democratic Party of Ontario passed the Agricultural Labour Relations Act which gave trade union and collective bargaining rights to Ontario's agricultural workers. The following year, the Conservatives were elected into power and subsequently passed the Labour Relations and Employment Statute Law Amendment Act (LRESLAA), which repealed the 1994 Act and terminated any collective agreements made under that Act.

Tom Dunmore, Salame Abdulhamid, Walter Lumsden and Michael Doyle with support from the United Food and Commercial Workers brought an application on behalf of the agricultural workers of Ontario to challenge the LRESLAA as a violation of their right to freedom of association and equality rights under sections 2(d) and 15(1) of the Charter respectively.

At trial, the judge found that the LRESLAA did not prevent the agricultural workers from forming a labour union and that any obstacles were the result of the actions of their employers which are private parties and beyond the scope of the Charter. The decision was upheld by the Court of Appeal.

The issues before the Supreme Court was whether the LRESLAA violated section 2(d) or 15(1) of the Charter, and if so, whether it could be saved under section 1.

The majority of the Court held that section 2(d) was violated and could not be justified under section 1.

== Opinion of the Court ==
Bastarache J wrote the opinion for the majority. He began by describing the purpose of section 2(d) which is "to allow the achievement of individual potential through interpersonal relationships and collective action". The previous interpretation of section 2(d) which only protected individuals, said Bastarache, was insufficient. The right should be broader and should create a "positive obligation on the state to extend protective legislation to unprotected groups".

For a claimant to successfully argue that the under-inclusiveness of legislation violated his or her right to freedom of association, he or she must "demonstrate that exclusion from a statutory regime permits a substantial interference" of their right.

Bastarache examined the LRESLAA and found that its purpose was "to establish and maintain an association of employees", which would fall under section 2(d). Though the purpose of the Act did not violate the Charter, the effect of the Act did violate the Charter. By removing the ALRA and excluding the agricultural workers, their vulnerable position was reinforced and they became substantially incapable of exercising their rights.

== Dissent ==
In dissent, Major J argued that section 2(d) did not impose any positive rights and that there was nothing preventing the workers from forming their own association.

== See also ==
- List of Supreme Court of Canada cases (McLachlin Court)
