= London Drugs Ltd v Kuehne & Nagel International Ltd =

- Supreme Court of Canada

Hearing: October 29, 1991 Judgment: October 29, 1992
- Citations: [1992] 3 SCR 299
- Docket No.: 21980

Holding
- When parties enter into commercial agreements and decide that one of them and its employees will benefit from limited liability, the doctrine of privity should not stand in the way of commercial reality and justice.

Court membership
- Chief Justice: Antonio Lamer; Puisne Justices: Gérard La Forest, Claire L'Heureux-Dubé, John Sopinka, Charles Gonthier, Peter Cory, Beverley McLachlin, William Stevenson, Frank Iacobucci

Reasons given
- Majority: Iacobucci J, joined by L'Heureux‑Dubé, Sopinka, and Cory JJ
- Concurrence: McLachlin J
- Concur/dissent: La Forest J
- Stevenson J took no part in the consideration or decision of the case.

London Drugs Ltd v Kuehne & Nagel International Ltd, [1992] 3 SCR 299 is a leading decision of the Supreme Court of Canada on privity of contract.

== Background ==
Kuehne & Nagel was storing a transformer owned by London Drugs valued at $32,000. The agreement between the parties included a limitation of liability clause which limited liability for damage to the transformer to $40. Two employees were moving the transformer with a forklift and negligently dropped it.

London Drugs sued the two employees on the basis that they owed a separate duty of care and could not seek protection under the contract.

== The courts below ==
London Drugs succeeded at first instance at the British Columbia Supreme Court, where the trial judge found the employees personally liable for the full amount of the damages, limiting the company's liability to $40. That judgment was reversed in part on appeal to the British Columbia Court of Appeal, where, in a majority decision, the employees' liability was reduced to $40.

London Drugs appealed this decision and the respondent employees cross‑appealed, arguing that they should be completely free of liability.

== At the Supreme Court of Canada ==
The appeal was dismissed in a 6–0 ruling, while the cross-appeal was dismissed 5–1.

=== The majority opinion ===
Iacobucci J, writing for the majority, observed:

There is no general rule in Canada to the effect that an employee acting in the course of his or her employment and performing the "very essence" of his or her employer's contractual obligations with a customer, does not owe a duty of care, whether one labels it "independent" or otherwise, to the employer's customer. The mere fact that the employee is performing the "very essence" of a contract between the plaintiff and his or her employer does not, in itself, necessarily preclude a conclusion that a duty of care was present.

While the employees were liable in negligence, they were able to gain protection under the contract. Employees are able to gain protection where:

1. the limitation of liability clause must, either expressly or impliedly, extend its benefit to the employee(s) seeking to rely on it; and
2. the employee(s) seeking the benefit of the limitation of liability clause must have been acting in the course of their employment and must have been performing the very services provided for in the contract between their employer and the plaintiff when the loss occurred.

=== Concurrence by McLachlin ===
McLachlin J concurred, but for different reasons. Tort and contract constitute separate legal regimes, and the appellant's action against the employees in this case is necessarily in tort, since there was no contract between them. The theory of voluntary assumption of the risk permits an employee sued in tort to rely on a term of limitation in his employer's contract. The plaintiff, having agreed to the limitation of liability vis à vis the employer, must be taken to have done so with respect to the employer's employees.

=== Concurrence/dissent by La Forest ===
La Forest J, in dissent, believed the respondent employees did not owe any duty of care to the appellant in the circumstances of this case. He applied the "Anns test" as formulated by the House of Lords, which asks:

- Is there a sufficient relationship of proximity, such that carelessness on his part may be likely to cause damage to the latter (in which case, a prima facie duty of care arises)?
- If so, are there any considerations which ought to reduce or limit

- the scope of the duty,
- the class of person to whom it is owed, or
- the damages to which a breach of it may give rise?

In the present case, the first question is answered in the affirmative. As to the second, he felt that the vicarious liability regime is best seen as a response to a number of policy concerns:

- It is not merely a mechanism by which the employer guarantees the employee's primary liability, but has the broader function of transferring to the enterprise itself the risks created by the activity performed by its agents.
- Elimination of the possibility of the employee bearing the loss is not only logically compatible with the vicarious liability regime, it is practically compelled by the developing logic of that regime.
- The employer will almost always be insured against the risk of being held liable to third parties by reason of his vicarious liability. Therefore, its cost is thus internalized to the profitable activity that gives rise to it.
- There is no requirement for double insurance, covering both the employee and his employer against the same risk.
- Further, imposing tort liability on the employee in these circumstances cannot be justified by the need to deter careless behaviour. An employee subjects himself to discipline or dismissal by a refusal to perform work as instructed by the employer, and the employer is free to establish contractual schemes of contribution from negligent employees.
- Finally, the elimination of employee liability will have no impact on the plaintiff's compensation in the vast majority of cases.

The employee remains liable to the plaintiff for his independent torts. An independent tort may fall within or outside the range of the employer's liability under the vicarious liability regime. In that regard, the following questions must be answered:

- Is the tort alleged against the employee an independent tort or a tort related to a contract between the employer and the plaintiff? In answering this question, it is legitimate to consider the scope of the contract, the nature of the employee's conduct and the nature of the plaintiff's interest.
- If the alleged tort is independent, the employee is liable to the plaintiff if the elements of the tort action are proved. The liability of the company to the plaintiff is determined under the ordinary rules applicable to cases of vicarious liability.
- If the tort is related to the contract, the next question to be resolved is whether any reliance by the plaintiff on the employee was reasonable. The question here is whether the plaintiff reasonably relied on the eventual legal responsibility of the defendants under the circumstances.

Since the conduct of the employees was covered by the contract, the plaintiffs were considered to have voluntarily assumed the risk of their tortious behaviour. The plaintiffs could not have reasonably relied on the employees and, thus, the employees were shielded from liability.

== Aftermath ==
There has been much discussion about the nature of the ruling in two areas:

- the duty of care by employees to other parties, and
- vicarious liability

The majority ruling, which shielded the employees' liability by virtue of contractual terms, has invited discussion as to the effect where such shielding is not in place.

La Forest J's discussion of vicarious liability has influenced subsequent Supreme Court decisions on that doctrine, most notably Bazley v Curry, which has had significant influence in the jurisprudence of other Commonwealth jurisdictions including the UK House of Lords in its ruling in Lister v Hesley Hall Ltd [2001] UKHL 22.

== See also ==
- List of Supreme Court of Canada cases
