= Reasons of the Supreme Court of Canada by Justice Rothstein =

This is a list of all the reasons written by Marshall Rothstein during his tenure as puisne justice of the Supreme Court of Canada.

== 2006 ==
Marshall Rothstein 2006 statistics

3	Majority or Plurality	0	Concurrence	0	Other
0	Dissent	0	Concurrence/dissent	Total =	3
Written reasons = 3		Oral reasons = 0		Unanimous reasons = 3

Case name	Issue	Co-authored by	Joined by
Goodis v Ontario (Ministry of Correctional Services), 2006 SCC 31	Solicitor-client privilege	None	Unanimous
Isen v Simms, 2006 SCC 41	Maritime law; division of powers	None	Unanimous
Walker v Ritchie, 2006 SCC 45	Costs	None	Unanimous

== 2007 ==
Marshall Rothstein 2007 statistics

7	Majority or Plurality	0	Concurrence	0	Other
2	Dissent	0	Concurrence/dissent	Total =	9
Written reasons = 9		Oral reasons = 0		Unanimous reasons = 0

Case name	Issue	Co-authored by	Joined by
Double N Earthmovers Ltd v Edmonton (City), 2007 SCC 3	Tenders; "bid shopping"	Abella J	LeBel, Deschamps and Fish JJ
Canada (AG) v Hislop, 2007 SCC 10	Sexual orientation; Survivorship pensions; Whether there was s. 15 violation of the Charter	LeBel J	McLachlin CJ and Binnie, Deschamps and Abella JJ
Council of Canadians with Disabilities v Via Rail Canada Inc, 2007 SCC 15	Duty to accommodate passengers with disabilities	Deschamps J	Binnie and Fish JJ
Pecore v Pecore, 2007 SCC 17	Nature of survivorship in context of joint accounts	None	McLachlin CJ and Bastarache, Binnie, LeBel, Deschamps, Fish and Charron JJ
Madsen Estate v Saylor, 2007 SCC 18	Presumptions of resulting trust and advancement	None	McLachlin CJ and Bastarache, Binnie, LeBel, Deschamps, Fish and Charron JJ
R v Couture, 2007 SCC 28	Whether statements admissible under principled exception to hearsay rule	None	Bastarache, Deschamps and Abella JJ
Baier v Alberta, 2007 SCC 31	School board elections; Ineligibility of school employees; Whether there is a s.2 or s.15 violation of the Charter	None	McLachlin CJ and Binnie, Deschamps and Charron JJ
Euro-Excellence Inc v Kraft Canada Inc, 2007 SCC 37	Whether accessories or incidental works exempted from copyright protection	None	Binnie and Deschamps JJ
AYSA Amateur Youth Soccer Association v Canada (Revenue Agency), 2007 SCC 42	Whether registered Canadian amateur athletic association provisions of Income Tax Act preclude amateur sports association from charitable status	None	McLachlin CJ and Bastarache, Binnie, LeBel, Deschamps, Fish and Charron JJ

== 2008 ==
- British Columbia v Zastowny, [2008] 1 SCR 27; 2008 SCC 4 (Maj)
- R v Beatty, [2008] 1 S.C.R. 49; 2008 SCC 5 (Maj)
- 620 Connaught Ltd v Canada (AG), [2008] 1 SCR 131; 2008 SCC 7 (Maj)
- Design Services Ltd v Canada, [2008] 1 SCR 737, 2008 SCC 22 (Maj)
- R v DB, [2008] 2 SCR 3, 2008 SCC 25
- Canada v McLarty, [2008] 2 SCR 79, 2008 SCC 26
- Redeemer Foundation v Canada (National Revenue), [2008] 2 SCR 643, 2008 SCC 46
- R v LTH, [2008] 2 SCR 739, 2008 SCC 49
- FH v McDougall, [2008] 3 SCR 41, 2008 SCC 53
- Apotex Inc v Sanofi‑Synthelabo Canada Inc, [2008] 3 SCR 265, 2008 SCC 61 (Maj)
- Canadian National Railway Co v Royal and Sun Alliance Insurance Co of Canada, [2008] 3 SCR 453, 2008 SCC 66 (Dis)

== 2009 ==
- Lipson v Canada, 2009 SCC 1, [2009] 1 SCR 3 (Dis)
- Shafron v KRG Insurance Brokers (Western) Inc, 2009 SCC 6, [2009] 1 SCR 157 (Maj)
- Ermineskin Indian Band and Nation v Canada, 2009 SCC 9, [2009] 1 S.C.R. 222 (Maj)
- Canada (Citizenship and Immigration) v Khosa, 2009 SCC 12, [2009] 1 S.C.R. 339
- United Parcel Service Canada Ltd v Canada, 2009 SCC 20, [2009] 1 S.C.R. 657
- R v Ouellette, 2009 SCC 24, [2009] 1 S.C.R. 818
- Caisse populaire Desjardins de l'Est de Drummond v Canada, 2009 SCC 29, [2009] 2 S.C.R. 94
- R v Layton, 2009 SCC 36, [2009] 2 S.C.R. 540
- R v Bjelland, 2009 SCC 38, [2009] 2 S.C.R. 651
- Nolan v Kerry (Canada) Inc, 2009 SCC 39, [2009] 2 S.C.R. 678
- Northrop Grumman Overseas Services Corp v Canada (AG), 2009 SCC 50, [2009] 3 S.C.R. 309
- Consolidated Fastfrate Inc v Western Canada Council of Teamsters, 2009 SCC 53, [2009] 3 S.C.R. 407

== 2010 ==
Statistics

XXXXX	Majority or Plurality	XXX	Concurrence	XXXX	Other
XXXX	Dissent	XXXX	Concurrence/dissent	Total =	XXXXXX
Written opinions = XXX		Oral opinions = XXX		Unanimous decisions = XXX

Case name	Issue	Co-authored by	Joined by
XXX; CITATIONS [URL]	XXX	XXX	XXX
XXX; CITATIONS [URL]	XXX	XXX	XXX

== 2011 ==
Statistics

XXXXX	Majority or Plurality	XXX	Concurrence	XXXX	Other
XXXX	Dissent	XXXX	Concurrence/dissent	Total =	XXXXXX
Written opinions = XXX		Oral opinions = XXX		Unanimous decisions = XXX

Case name	Issue	Co-authored by	Joined by
R v White; 2011 SCC 13	Whether the trial judge's failure to state to the jury that post-offence conduct has no probative value constituted an error of law	–	LeBel, Abella and Cromwell JJ
R v JAA; 2011 SCC 17	Admission of fresh evidence	–	Deschamps J
Ontario (AG) v Fraser; 2011 SCC 20	Whether separate labour relations legislation governing agricultural workers in Ontario infringes freedom of association under s. 2(d) of the Charter by failing to establish a meaningful process of collective bargaining	–	Charron J
Sharbern Holding Inc v Vancouver Airport Centre Ltd; 2011 SCC 23	Purchasers of strata units in each hotel entering into different arrangements with developer, with one purchaser not being informed of different financial arrangements offered to the other, and whether the developer is liable under provincial statute for misrepresentation for material false statements — Whether developer is liable for same at common law for tort of negligent misrepresentation — Whether developer owed a fiduciary duty to purchaser	–	Unanimous
Masterpiece Inc v Alavida Lifestyles Inc; 2011 SCC 27	Trademarks and confusion — Whether location where trademark is used is relevant to confusion analysis — What considerations are applicable in assessment of resemblance between proposed use trademark and existing unregistered trademark — How nature and cost of wares or services affects confusion analysis — Use of expert evidence in confusion analysis	–	Unanimous
Alberta (Information and Privacy Commissioner) v Alberta Teachers' Association; 2011 SCC 61	Whether a matter that was not raised at a tribunal may be judicially reviewed — Whether a tribunal's decision relating to the interpretation of its home statute or statutes closely connected to its functions is reviewable on a standard of reasonableness or correctness	–	McLachlin CJ and LeBel, Fish, Abella and Charron JJ
Copthorne Holdings Ltd v Canada; 2011 SCC 63	Interpretation and application of general anti-tax avoidance rule	–	Unanimous
RP v RC; 2011 SCC 65	Husband applying to terminate spousal support order on basis of his retirement and the market downturn, and whether the husband had established there had been a material change in circumstances since the original support order	Abella J	Binnie, LeBel and Deschamps JJ
LMP v LS; 2011 SCC 64	The proper approach to an application for variation of spousal support order under section 17(4.1) of the Divorce Act where support terms of agreement have been incorporated into an order	Abella J	Binnie, LeBel and Deschamps JJ

== 2012 ==
Statistics

7	Majority or Plurality	0	Concurrence	0	Other
2	Dissent	1	Concurrence/dissent	Total =	10
Written opinions = 10		Oral opinions = 0		Unanimous decisions = 4

Case name	Issue	Co-authored by	Joined by
R v Ipeelee; 2012 SCC 13	Principles governing the sentencing of aboriginal offenders	–	–
Calgary (City of) v Canada; 2012 SCC 20	Taxation and whether acquisition and construction of transit facilities constitutes and exempt supply, a taxable supply or both	–	Unanimous
Rogers Communications Inc v Society of Composers, Authors and Music Publishers of Canada; 2012 SCC 35	Intellectual property and the whether streaming of files from the Internet triggered by individual users constitutes communication "to the public" of the musical workers contained therein by online music services who make the files available for streaming	–	McLachlin CJ and LeBel, Deschamps, Fish, Cromwell, Moldaver and Karakatsanis JJ
Entertainment Software Association v Society of Composers, Authors and Music Publishers of Canada; 2012 SCC 34	Intellectual property and whether the transmission of musical works contained in a video game through an Internet download is a communication "to the public" under the federal Copyright Act	–	LeBel, Fish and Cromwell JJ
Alberta (Education) v Canadian Copyright Licensing Agency (Access Copyright); 2012 SCC 37	Intellectual property; Teachers making photocopies of excerpts of textbooks and other copyrighted works to distribute to students as part of class instruction, and whether elementary and secondary schools can claim the benefit of "fair dealing" exemption for copies of works made at teachers' initiative with instructive to students that they read the material	–	Deschamps, Fish and Cromwell JJ
Canada v Craig; 2012 SCC 43	Income tax and whether farm income combined with other income constitutes chief source of income	–	Unanimous
Canada v GlaxoSmithKline Inc; 2012 SCC 52	Income taxation	–	Unanimous
Opitz v Wrzesnewskyj; 2012 SCC 55	Application to have federal election result annulled on the basis of "irregularities... that affected the result of the election" under s. 531(2) of the Canada Elections Act	Moldaver J	Deschamps and Abella JJ
Reference re Broadcasting Regulatory Policy CRTC 2010-167 and Broadcasting Order CRTC 2010-168; 2012 SCC 68	Whether the Canadian Radio-television and Telecommunications Commission has jurisdiction under the federal Broadcast Act to implement a policy empowering private local television stations to negotiate direct compensation for retransmission of signals by cable and satellite companies, as well as the right to prohibit such undertakings from retransmitting those signals if negotiations are unsuccessful	–	McLachlin CJ and LeBel, Fish and Moldaver
Professional Institute of the Public Service of Canada v Canada (AG); 2012 SCC 71	Pensions – Whether the federal government, as administrators of pension plan, owe a fiduciary duty to plan members; Whether superannuation accounts contain assets	–	Unanimous

== 2013 ==
Statistics

9	Majority or Plurality	0	Concurrence	0	Other
4	Dissent	0	Concurrence/dissent	Total =	13
Written opinions = 13		Oral opinions = 0		Unanimous decisions = 6

Case name	Issue	Co-authored by	Joined by
R v O'Brien; 2013 SCC 2	Offence of uttering threats	–	McLachlin CJ and Abella J
Saskatchewan Human Rights Commission v Whatcott; 2013 SCC 11	Freedom of religion and hate publications under s. 2(a) of the Charter	–	Unanimous
Manitoba Metis Federation Inc v Canada (AG); 2013 SCC 14	Aboriginal law and the honour of the Crown	–	Moldaver J
Ediger v Johnston; 2013 SCC 18	Tort of negligence	Moldaver J	Unanimous
Daishowa-Marubeni International Ltd v Canada; 2013 SCC 29	Proceeds of disposition and taxation	–	Unanimous
Nishi v Rascal Trucking Ltd; 2013 SCC 33	Trusts	–	Unanimous
Communications, Energy and Paperworkers Union of Canada, Local 30 v Irving Pulp & Paper, Ltd; 2013 SCC 34	Labour arbitration and collective agreement management rights clauses	Moldaver J	McLachlin CJ
Envision Credit Union v Canada; 2013 SCC 48	Taxation – Amalgamating credit unions seeking to avoid flow-through of certain tax attributes to double claim capital cost allowance and reset preferred rate amount	–	McLachlin CJ and LeBel, Moldaver, Karakatsanis and Wagner JJ
British Columbia (Forests) v Teal Cedar Products Ltd; 2013 SCC 51	Commercial arbitration and compensation for expropriation	–	Unanimous
Sun-Rype Products Ltd v Archer Daniels Midland Co; 2013 SCC 58	Civil procedure – Certification of class actions	–	McLachlin CJ and LeBel, Fish, Abella, Moldaver and Wagner JJ
Pro-Sys Consultants Ltd v Microsoft Corp; 2013 SCC 57	Civil procedure – Certification of class actions	–	Unanimous
R v Hay; 2013 SCC 61	Jury charges and eyewitness evidence	–	McLachlin CJ and LeBel, Abella, Cromwell and Wagner JJ
IBM Canada Ltd v Waterman; 2013 SCC 70	Employment law – Whether pension benefits should be deducted from damages for wrongful dismissal	–	McLachlin CJ

== 2014 ==
Statistics

11	Majority or Plurality	0	Concurrence	0	Other
2	Dissent	1	Concurrence/dissent	Total =	14
Written opinions = 13		Oral opinions = 1		Unanimous decisions = 9

Case name	Issue	Co-authored by	Joined by
Telecommunications Employees Association of Manitoba Inc v Manitoba Telecom Services Inc; 2014 SCC 11	Pensions	–	Unanimous
Bernard v Canada (AG); 2014 SCC 13	Judicial review of labour arbitration decisions	–	Moldaver J
John Doe v Ontario (Finance); 2014 SCC 36	Access to information and exemptions under the Freedom of Information and Protection of Privacy Act	–	Unanimous
Canadian National Railway Co v Canada (AG); 2014 SCC 40	Judicial review of Canadian Transport Agency decisions	–	Unanimous
Canadian Artists' Representation v National Gallery of Canada; 2014 SCC 42	Intellectual property and collective bargaining	–	Unanimous
United Food and Commercial Workers, Local 503 v Wal-Mart Canada Corp; 2014 SCC 45	Judicial review of labour arbitration decision and employer's unilateral change of employment conditions under s. 59 of the Quebec Labour Code	Wagner J	–
Sattva Capital Corp v Creston Molly Corp; 2014 SCC 53	Standard of review of contractual interpretation	–	Unanimous
R v Mian; 2014 SCC 54	Right to be informed of reasons for arrest and right to counsel under ss. 10(a) and (b) of the Charter	–	Unanimous
Marcotte v Fédération des caisses Desjardins du Québec; 2014 SCC 57	Division of powers and bills of exchange	Wagner J	Unanimous
Bank of Montreal v Marcotte; 2014 SCC 55	Class actions and standing	Wagner J	Unanimous
Amex Bank of Canada v Adams; 2014 SCC 56	Class actions and the Quebec Consumer Protection Act	Wagner J	Unanimous
Trial Lawyers Association of British Columbia v British Columbia (AG); 2014 SCC 59	Access to justice and the constitutionality of hearing fees under ss. 92(14) and 96 of the Constitution Act, 1867	–	–
R v Conception; 2014 SCC 60	Mental disorders and dispositions by a court or review board	Cromwell J	LeBel, Abella and Gascon JJ
R v Wills; 2014 SCC 73	Reasonableness of trial verdict	–	Moldaver and Wagner JJ (oral)

== 2015 ==
Statistics

7	Majority or Plurality	1	Concurrence	0	Other
1	Dissent	1	Concurrence/dissent	Total =	10
Written opinions = 10		Oral opinions = 0		Unanimous decisions = 3

Case name	Issue	Co-authored by	Joined by
Mounted Police Association of Ontario v Canada (AG); 2015 SCC 1	Right to collective bargaining under s. 2(d) of the Charter; Whether impugned legislation excluding RCMP members from public services labour relations regime substantially interferes with the right to a meaningful process of collective bargaining	–	–
Meredith v Canada (AG); 2015 SCC 2	Whether the statutory limit on wages increases in the public sector under the Expenditure Restraint Act infringes claimants' rights to a meaningful process of collective bargaining under s. 2(d) of the Charter	–	–
Tervita Corp v Canada (Commissioner of Competition; 2015 SCC 3	Legal test for when a merger gives rise to a substantial prevention of competition under the Competition Act; Defence of statutory efficiencies	–	McLachlin CJ and Cromwell, Moldaver and Wagner JJ
Saskatchewan Federation of Labour v Saskatchewan; 2015 SCC 4	Whether a right to strike is protected by freedom of association under s. 2(d) of the Charter; Whether prohibition on essential employees participating in strike action amounts to substantial interference with a meaningful process of collective bargaining	Wagner J	–
R v Araya; 2015 SCC 11	Whether photographs of the accused taken days after the alleged offence are admissible; Whether trial judge erred in jury instructions by referring to a witness' account of a conversation with the accused as a confession	–	Unanimous
Guindon v Canada; 2015 SCC 41	Whether proceedings under s. 163.2 of the Income Tax Act imposing monetary penalties on every person who makes a false statement that could be used by another person for purposes under that Act are criminal in nature or lead to the imposition of true penal consequences; Whether an individual assessed for same penalties is a person "charged with an offence" within the meaning of s. 11 of the Charter	Cromwell J	Moldaver and Gascon JJ
Stuart Olson Dominion Construction Ltd v Structural Heavy Steel; 2015 SCC 43	Relationship between lien and trust provisions in provincial legislation	–	Unanimous
Ontario (Energy Board) v Ontario Power Generation Inc; 2015 SCC 44	Whether Ontario Energy Board's utilities rate-setting decision to disallow $145 million in labour compensation costs related to utility's nuclear operations was a reasonable; Whether Ontario Energy Board acted improperly in pursuing appeal and in arguing in favour of the reasonableness of its own decision	–	McLachlin CJ and Cromwell, Moldaver, Karakatsanis and Gascon JJ
ATCO Gas and Pipelines Ltd v Alberta (Utilities Commission); 2015 SCC 45	Whether Alberta Utilities Commission interpretation and exercise of its utilities rate-setting authority under the provincial Gas Utilities Act was reasonable; Whether regulatory framework under same prescribes certain methodology in assessing whether costs are prudent	–	Unanimous
Canadian Broadcasting Corp v SODRAC 2003 Inc; 2015 SCC 57	Intellectual property and copyright	–	McLachlin CJ and Cromwell, Moldaver, Wagner, Gascon and Côté JJ
