= 2014 reasons of the Supreme Court of Canada =

The table below lists the decisions (known as reasons) delivered from the bench by the Supreme Court of Canada during 2014. The table illustrates what reasons were filed by each justice in each case, and which justices joined each reason. This list, however, does not include reasons on motions.

== Reasons ==
Delivered the Court's reason
Joined the Court's reason
Filed a concurrence
Joined a concurrence
Filed a dissent
Joined a dissent
Filed a concurrence/dissent
Joined a concurrence/dissent
Did not participate in the judgment
Did not participate in the final disposition of the judgment
Not a member of the Court at the time of hearing or delivering
- Decisions that do not note a Justice delivering the Court's reason are per coram.
- Multiple concurrences and dissents within a case are numbered, with joining votes numbered accordingly. Justices occasionally join multiple reasons in a single case; each vote is subdivided accordingly.
- Multiple unnumbered reasons are jointly written or delivered.
- Decisions that are given orally from the bench are denoted by a "V"; per coram decisions delivered orally from the bench only note a "V" on the most senior justice on the panel.
- An asterisk ( * ) in the Court's opinion denotes that it was only a majority in part or a plurality.

Case name	Argued	Decided	McLachlin	LeBel	Fish	Abella	Rothstein	Cromwell	Moldaver	Karakatsanis	Wagner	Gascon	Côté
Vivendi Canada Inc v Dell'Aniello, 2014 SCC 1	April 24, 2013	January 16, 2014
R v WEB, 2014 SCC 2	January 16, 2014	January 16, 2014							V
R v MacDonald, 2014 SCC 3	May 23, 2013	January 17, 2014
R v Davis, 2014 SCC 4	January 17, 2014	January 17, 2014		V
R v James, 2014 SCC 5	January 17, 2014	January 17, 2014							V
R v Auclair, 2014 SCC 6	January 21, 2014	January 21, 2014	V
R v Koczab, 2014 SCC 9	January 22, 2014	January 22, 2014	V
R v Yelle, 2014 SCC 10	January 22, 2014	January 22, 2014	V
Hryniak v Mauldin, 2014 SCC 7	March 26, 2013	January 23, 2014
Bruno Appliance and Furniture, Inc v Hryniak, 2014 SCC 8	March 26, 2013	January 23, 2014
Case name	Argued	Decided	McLachlin	LeBel	Fish	Abella	Rothstein	Cromwell	Moldaver	Karakatsanis	Wagner	Gascon	Côté
R v Clarke, 2014 SCC 28	January 24, 2014	January 24, 2014
Telecommunications Employees Association of Manitoba Inc v Manitoba Telecom Services Inc, 2014 SCC 11	May 16, 2013	January 30, 2014
AI Enterprises Ltd v Bram Enterprises Ltd, 2014 SCC 12	May 22, 2013	January 31, 2014
Bernard v Canada (AG), 2014 SCC 13	November 4, 2013	February 7, 2014
R v Flaviano, 2014 SCC 14	February 17, 2014	February 17, 2014							V
R v Sekhon, 2014 SCC 15	November 8, 2013	February 20, 2014
R v Babos, 2014 SCC 16	October 9, 2013	February 21, 2014
R v Waite, 2014 SCC 17	February 21, 2014	February 21, 2014	V
R v Hogg, 2014 SCC 18	February 21, 2014	February 21, 2014	V
R v Hutchinson, 2014 SCC 19	November 8, 2013	March 7, 2014
Case name	Argued	Decided	McLachlin	LeBel	Fish	Abella	Rothstein	Cromwell	Moldaver	Karakatsanis	Wagner	Gascon	Côté
Canada (AG) v Whaling, 2014 SCC 20	October 15, 2013	March 20, 2014
Reference Re Supreme Court Act, ss 5 and 6, 2014 SCC 21	January 15, 2014	March 21, 2014
R v Vokurka, 2014 SCC 22	March 21, 2014	March 21, 2014				V
R v Leinen, 2014 SCC 23	March 21, 2014	March 21, 2014		V
Mission Institution v Khela, 2014 SCC 24	October 16, 2013	March 27, 2014
Martin v Alberta (Workers' Compensation Board), 2014 SCC 25	December 10, 2013	March 28, 2014
R v Summers, 2014 SCC 26	January 23, 2014	April 11, 2014
R v Carvery, 2014 SCC 27	January 23, 2014	April 11, 2014
Peracomo Inc v TELUS Communications Co, 2014 SCC 29	November 15, 2013	April 23, 2014
R v Jackson 2014 SCC 30	April 23, 2014	April 23, 2014				V
Case name	Argued	Decided	McLachlin	LeBel	Fish	Abella	Rothstein	Cromwell	Moldaver	Karakatsanis	Wagner	Gascon	Côté
Ontario (Community Safety and Correctional Services) v Ontario (Information and Privacy Commissioner), 2014 SCC 31	December 5, 2013	April 24, 2014
Reference Re Senate Reform, 2014 SCC 32	November 14, 2013	April 25, 2014
Dionne v Commission scolaire des Patriotes, 2014 SCC 33	January 13, 2014	May 1, 2014
Immeubles Jacques Robitaille Inc v City of Quebec, 2014 SCC 34	February 20, 2014	May 2, 2014
Union Carbide Canada Inc v Bombardier Inc, 2014 SCC 35	December 11, 2013	May 8, 2014
John Doe v Ontario (Finance), 2014 SCC 36	November 6, 2013	May 9, 2014
Canada (Citizenship and Immigration) v Harkat, 2014 SCC 37	October 11, 2013	May 14, 2014
Canadian Artists' Representation v National Gallery of Canada, 2014 SCC 42	May 15, 2014	May 15, 2014
McCormick v Fasken Martineau DuMoulin LLP, 2014 SCC 39	December 13, 2013	May 22, 2014
Canadian National Railway Co v Canada (AG), 2014 SCC 40	January 14, 2014	May 23, 2014
Case name	Argued	Decided	McLachlin	LeBel	Fish	Abella	Rothstein	Cromwell	Moldaver	Karakatsanis	Wagner	Gascon	Côté
R v Anderson, 2014 SCC 41	March 19, 2014	June 6, 2014
R v Spencer, 2014 SCC 43	December 9, 2013	June 13, 2014
Tsilhqot'in Nation v British Columbia, 2014 SCC 44	November 7, 2013	June 26, 2014
United Food and Commercial Workers, Local 503 v Wal‑Mart Canada Corp, 2014 SCC 45	December 6, 2013	June 27, 2014
R v Quesnelle, 2014 SCC 46	March 20, 2014	July 9, 2014
R v Sipos, 2014 SCC 47	April 15, 2014	July 10, 2014
Grassy Narrows First Nation v Ontario (Natural Resources), 2014 SCC 48	May 15, 2014	July 11, 2014
Canada (AG) v Confédération des syndicats nationaux, 2014 SCC 49	January 20, 2014	July 17, 2014
R v Taylor, 2014 SCC 50	April 23, 2014	July 18, 2014
Quebec (Commission des normes du travail) v Asphalte Desjardins inc, 2014 SCC 51	March 28, 2014	July 25, 2014
Case name	Argued	Decided	McLachlin	LeBel	Fish	Abella	Rothstein	Cromwell	Moldaver	Karakatsanis	Wagner	Gascon	Côté
R v Hart, 2014 SCC 52	December 3, 2013	July 31, 2014						1		2
Sattva Capital Corp v Creston Moly Corp, 2014 SCC 53	December 12, 2013	August 1, 2014
R v Mian, 2014 SCC 54	April 15, 2014	September 12, 2014
Bank of Montreal v Marcotte, 2014 SCC 55	February 13, 2014	September 19, 2014
Amex Bank of Canada v Adams, 2014 SCC 56	February 13, 2014	September 19, 2014
Marcotte v Fédération des caisses Desjardins du Québec, 2014 SCC 57	February 13, 2014	September 19, 2014
R v Mack, 2014 SCC 58	December 3, 2013	September 26, 2014
Trial Lawyers Association of British Columbia v British Columbia (AG), 2014 SCC 59	April 14, 2014	October 2, 2014
R v Conception, 2014 SCC 60	October 17, 2013	October 3, 2014
R v Steele, 2014 SCC 61	April 17, 2014	October 9, 2014
Case name	Argued	Decided	McLachlin	LeBel	Fish	Abella	Rothstein	Cromwell	Moldaver	Karakatsanis	Wagner	Gascon	Côté
Kazemi Estate v Islamic Republic of Iran, 2014 SCC 62	March 18, 2014	October 10, 2014
R v Mohamed, 2014 SCC 63	October 10, 2014	October 10, 2014						V
R v Bouchard, 2014 SCC 64	October 16, 2014	October 16, 2014						V
R v Lepine, 2014 SCC 65	October 16, 2014	October 16, 2014						V
Imperial Oil v Jacques, 2014 SCC 66	April 24, 2014	October 17, 2014
Thibodeau v Air Canada, 2014 SCC 67	March 26, 2014	October 28, 2014
Febles v Canada (Citizenship and Immigration), 2014 SCC 68	March 25, 2014	October 30, 2014
R v Dunn, 2014 SCC 69	November 5, 2014	November 5, 2014	V
British Columbia Teachers' Federation v British Columbia Public School Employers' Association, 2014 SCC 70	November 12, 2014	November 12, 2014								V
Bhasin v Hrynew, 2014 SCC 71	February 12, 2014	November 13, 2014
Case name	Argued	Decided	McLachlin	LeBel	Fish	Abella	Rothstein	Cromwell	Moldaver	Karakatsanis	Wagner	Gascon	Côté
Wakeling v United States of America, 2014 SCC 72	April 22, 2014	November 14, 2014							*
R v Wills, 2014 SCC 73	November 14, 2014	November 20, 2014					V
R v Day, 2014 SCC 74	December 8, 2014	December 8, 2014	V
R v Wilcox, 2014 SCC 75	December 8, 2014	December 8, 2014								V
R v MacLeod, 2014 SCC 76	December 10, 2014	December 10, 2014						V
R v Fearon, 2014 SCC 77	May 23, 2014	December 11, 2014
Case name	Argued	Decided	McLachlin	LeBel	Fish	Abella	Rothstein	Cromwell	Moldaver	Karakatsanis	Wagner	Gascon	Côté

== 2014 statistics ==
Justice	Reasons written	% Majority
Chief Justice Beverley McLachlin	14 / 2 / 0 / 0 / Total=16	59 of 60 (98.3%)
Puisne Justice Louis LeBel	10 / 0 / 0 / 1 / Total=11	55 of 57 (96.5%)
Puisne Justice Morris Fish	0 / 0 / 0 / 0 / Total=0	3 of 3 (100%)
Pusine Justice Rosalie Abella	8 / 1 / 1 / 5 / Total=15	55 of 63 (87.3%)
Pusine Justice Marshall Rothstein	11 / 0 / 1 / 0 / Total=12	59 of 62 (95.2%)
Pusine Justice Thomas Cromwell	16 / 2 / 1 / 0 / Total=19	58 of 62 (93.5%)
Pusine Justice Michael Moldaver	9 / 2 / 0 / 1 / Total=12	61 of 63 (96.8%)
Pusine Justice Andromache Karakatsanis	9 / 2 / 0 / 2 / Total=13	58 of 61 (95.1%)
Pusine Justice Richard Wagner	13 / 1 / 1 / 1 / Total=16	62 of 65 (95.4%)
Puisne Justice Clément Gascon	0 / 0 / 0 / 0 / Total=0	8 of 8 (100%)
Puisne Justice Suzanne Côté	0 / 0 / 0 / 0 / Total=0	0 of 0 (N/A)
Notes on statistics: A justice is only included in the majority if they have joined or concurred in the Court's judgment in full. Percentages are based only on the cases in which a justice participated, and are rounded to the nearest decimal.
