= Daishowa-Marubeni International Ltd v Canada =

- Supreme Court of Canada

Hearing: 20 February 2013 Judgment: 23 May 2013
- Citations: 2013 SCC 29
- Docket No.: 34534
- Prior history: APPEAL from Daishowa Paper Manufacturing Ltd. v. Canada, 2011 FCA 267 (23 September 2011), Federal Court of Appeal (Canada), setting aside Daishowa-Marubeni International Ltd. v. The Queen, 2010 TCC 317 (11 June 2010), Tax Court (Canada).
- Ruling: Appeal is allowed with costs throughout to DMI; the matter is remitted to the Minister for reassessment in accordance with the ruling.

Holding
- 1. As the cost of reforestation is not a distinct existing liability of the vendor, the assumption of such cost is thus excluded from proceeds of disposition independent of whether the cost is absolute or contingent.; 2. Any amount that the parties assigned to the reforestation obligations in the sale agreement was simply a factor in determining the fair market value of the forest tenures.

Court membership
- Chief Justice: Beverley McLachlin; Puisne Justices: Louis LeBel, Marie Deschamps, Morris Fish, Rosalie Abella, Marshall Rothstein, Thomas Cromwell, Michael Moldaver, Andromache Karakatsanis

Reasons given
- Unanimous reasons by: Rothstein J

Laws applied
- "Income Tax Act, R.S.C. 1985, c. 1 (5th Supp.)".

Daishowa-Marubeni International Ltd v Canada is a significant case of the Supreme Court of Canada concerning the application of Canadian income tax law, as well as the purposive interpretation of statutes.

== Background ==
Daishowa‑Marubeni International Ltd., a company owned by Daishowa Paper Manufacturing and Marubeni Corporation, operated pulp mills in Peace River, Alberta and in Quesnel, British Columbia. Through separate subsidiaries in High Level, Alberta ("High Level") and Red Earth Creek, Alberta ("Brewster"), it carried on the business of harvesting logs and manufacturing finished timber. At the beginning of 1999, the subsidiaries were amalgamated into the parent company.

High Level was sold later in 1999 to Tolko Industries Ltd., and Brewster in 2000 to Seehta Forest Products. Both transactions included the sale of timber licences, each of which is considered to be a "timber resource property" under the Income Tax Act (Canada). Under Alberta law, consent was granted for the transfer of such licences subject to the condition that the purchaser assume all obligations relating to the reforestation of the land covered by the licence.

In filing its 1999 and 2000 tax returns Daishowa did not include the amounts relating to the assumption of such liabilities as part of the proceeds of disposition relating to the sale of such properties. The Minister of National Revenue asserted that it should have been part of such amount, relying on the definition set out in the Act at s. 248(1):

"amount" means money, rights or things expressed in terms of the amount of money or the value in terms of money of the right or thing...

The Minister accordingly reassessed, adding into the proceeds of disposition $11,000,000 in respect of High Level and $2,966,301 in respect of Brewster, based on the estimated cost in DMI's accounting records, and accordingly adjusted Daishowa's taxable income for the years in question. Daishowa appealed the reassessment to the Tax Court of Canada, contending that the fair market value of those liabilities was not determinable at the time of closing and thus should not be included.

== The courts below ==
At the TCC, Miller J allowed DMI's appeal of the Minister's reassessment in part. He agreed with the Minister, observing:

[24] Dealing first with the issue of consideration, Daishowa has acknowledged that a benefit was received by it on the assumption by Tolko of the reforestation liability. Indeed there is an admitted fact: "If Tolko had not assumed the Appellant's silviculture liability, the amount of cash or other consideration it would have paid the Appellant would have increased." Given that acknowledgement and admission, it is difficult to find the assumption of liability is not part of the consideration in the deal notwithstanding Daishowa took great pains to have that element of the deal removed from the definition of purchase price in the final agreement.

However, he held that it was not appropriate to add the entire estimated cost of the obligations to the proceeds, preferring to restrict the amount added back to the estimated cost that would take place within the 12 months following each sale, plus 20 percent of the estimated cost of the activities that would take place thereafter.

The Federal Court of Appeal dismissed Daishowa's appeal, allowed the Minister's cross-appeal and set aside the Judge's decision. In his ruling, Nadon JA (as he then was) agreed with Miller J as to the whether assumption of liabilities formed part of consideration, but held that there was no basis for reducing the value in question:

[78] As part of its argument that the $11,000,000 relating to the silviculture liability should not be included in the proceeds of distribution, the appellant argued that the liability was uncertain or contingent and, as a result, not subject to taxation. In view of my conclusion that Tolko and the appellant had agreed to a specific price for the assumption of the silviculture liability, this submission is without merit. However, the following remarks regarding that argument will, I hope, be helpful.

[79] Liabilities are absolute or contingent. The Supreme Court defined a contingent liability as "a liability which depends for its existence upon an event which may or not happen." If a liability is not contingent, it is absolute. However, the jurisprudence interpreting subsection 13(21) of the Act does not ask whether the liability assumed by the purchaser is contingent or absolute; as a matter of fact, the nature of the liability assumed by a purchaser is irrelevant. Instead, the jurisprudence seems concerned only with the value attributed by the parties, if any, to the liability assumed by the purchaser. If the parties attribute no value to a future liability, then there is nothing to be added to the seller's proceeds of disposition for the purpose of taxation.

[80] For instance, in the Contracts for the sale of both High Level and Brewster, the purchasers assumed all future tort liability flowing from their running the appellant's timber mills. Obviously, if a worker had been injured through gross negligence at one of the two mills after the appellant had sold it, the purchasers would be liable for any tort damages that were awarded. Still, despite the existence of such future tort liability, the parties attributed no value to the assumption of this liability by the purchasers. Because no value was attributed by the parties to the purchasers' assumption of tort liability, the Minister correctly did not add any income to the appellant's disposition of proceeds for the assumption of that liability. Conversely, if the parties to an agreement attribute a value to a future liability, then the Minister is entitled to add this amount to the vendor's proceeds of disposition – whether or not the liability assumed by the purchaser is contingent or absolute.

Mainville JA dissented, arguing that the reforestation obligations depressed the value of the timber resource properties, and thus resulted in a lower purchase price than would otherwise have been obtained for the sale.

Daishowa appealed the FCA ruling to the Supreme Court of Canada.

== At the SCC ==
[1] In this appeal, the Court is called upon to answer the age-old question: If a tree falls in the forest and you are not around to replant it, how does it affect your taxes?

—Justice Marshall Rothstein, in delivering his judgment

Appeal was allowed, and the matter was returned to the Minister for appropriate reassessment. In a unanimous ruling, Rothstein J dealt with two issues:

1. Are the reforestation liabilities to be included in the proceeds of disposition because the vendor is relieved of a liability or are they integral to and run with the forest tenures?
2. Does it make any difference that the parties agreed to a specific amount of the future reforestation liability?

On the first issue, he held:

- Mainville J was correct in stating that the obligations — much like needed repairs to property — are a future cost embedded in the forest tenure that serves to depress the tenure's value at the time of sale.
- as the cost of reforestation is not a distinct existing liability of the vendor, the assumption of such cost is thus excluded from proceeds of disposition independent of whether the cost is absolute or contingent.
- the Minister's approach, which would have resulted in different values for the vendor's proceeds of disposition and the purchaser's adjusted cost base, is thus avoided, as "an interpretation of the Act that promotes symmetry and fairness through a harmonious taxation scheme is to be preferred over an interpretation which promotes neither value."

On the second issue:

- the Minister and the lower courts were mistaken in relying on the company's accounting estimates as a basis for their reasoning
- any amount that the parties assigned to the reforestation obligations in the sale agreement was simply a factor in determining the fair market value of the forest tenures
- It is also irrelevant that Daishowa estimated the cost of future reforestation to compute its income for accounting purposes, as financial accounting and income tax calculation serve distinct purposes

== Impact ==
In Daishowa, the SCC made a distinction between obligations that do not affect the value of assets (such as mortgages) and those that affect the value of property (such as the need for repairs). The assumption of the former would be included in the proceeds of disposition, while assumption of the latter would reduce the value (and therefore the purchase price) of the property. This suggests that the distinction can be made based on whether a liability can be described as being embedded in a specific property right or not, which causes the following questions to arise:

- would pension deficits or post-retirement benefit obligations affect the value of property rights such as workforce in place or goodwill?
- should an agreed estimate of such liabilities be included in proceeds of disposition to the vendor?
- should the assumption of such obligations be reflected as an addition to the cost of assets acquired by the purchaser, and does such an addition occur at the time of acquisition or when such expenses are actually incurred?

During the SCC's hearing of the case, the Canadian Association of Petroleum Producers, acting as an intervener, submitted that statutory obligations to reclaim mined land may be so physically connected to the process of mining itself that the obligations cannot be separated from the property right. Rothstein J declared in obiter:

While I need not decide that question on the record before me, I would certainly not foreclose the possibility that obligations associated with a property right could be embedded in that property right without there being a statute, regulation or government policy that expressly restricts a vendor from selling the property right without assigning those obligations to the purchaser.

While of considerable economic significance to Canadian resource industries, and praised by observers as reflecting commercial common sense, Daishowa also has great importance in assessing the SCC's "modern" approach to statutory interpretation. Although not as extensive in its use of the purposive approach as it was in Rizzo Shoes or in its earlier case of Stubart Investments Ltd. v. The Queen, it did employ a more restrained approach as seen in Copthorne Holdings Ltd. v. Canada where Rothstein J (in his decision there) observed that interpretation should not be based on "a value judgment of what is right or wrong nor with theories about what tax law ought to be or ought to do."
