= Reasons of the Supreme Court of Canada by Justice Abella =

This is a list of all the reasons written by Rosalie Abella during her tenure as puisne justice of the Supreme Court of Canada.

== 2005 ==
2005 statistics

6	Majority or Plurality	0	Concurrence	0	Other
4	Dissent	0	Concurrence/dissent	Total =	10
Written opinions = ?		Oral opinions = ?		Unanimous decisions = ?

Case name	Issue	Co-authored by	Joined by
R v Grandinetti; 2005 SCC 5	Admissibility of confessions	None	Unanimous
Tsiaprailis v Canada; 2005 SCC 8	Taxation; disabled	None	Major and LeBel JJ
Nova Scotia (Minister of Health) v JJ; 2005 SCC 12	Family services; adult care	None	Unanimous
Fédération des producteurs de volailles du Québec v Pelland [2005] 2005 SCC 20	Federalism; provincial chicken market scheme	None	Unanimous
Prebushewski v Dodge City Auto (1984) Ltd; 2005 SCC 28	Consumer protection	None	Unanimous
R v GR; 2005 SCC 45	Incest	None	Bastarache, LeBel and Deschamps JJ
R v Turcotte; 2005 SCC 50	Common law right to silence	None	Unanimous
Hilewitz v Canada (Minister of Citizenship and Immigration); De Jong v Canada (Minister of Citizenship and Immigration); 2005 SCC 57	Inadmissible for health reasons, burden on social services	None	McLachlin CJ and Major, Bastarache, Binnie, Fish and Charron JJ.
EB v Order of the Oblates of Mary Immaculate in the Province of British Columbia; 2005 SCC 60	Vicarious liability; employment law	None	None
R v RC; 2005 SCC 61	Forsensic DNA	None	LeBel and Charron JJ

== 2006 ==
Rosalie Abella 2006 statistics

4	Majority or Plurality	2	Concurrence	0	Other
1	Dissent	0	Concurrence/dissent	Total =	7
Written opinions = 7		Oral opinions = 0		Unanimous decisions = 1

Case name	Issue	Co-Authored by	Joined by
Canada (Human Rights Commission) v Canadian Airlines International Ltd; 2006 SCC 1	Statutory interpretation; discrimination for unequal wages	LeBel J	McLachlin CJ and Bastarache, Binnie, Fish and Charron JJ
Multani v Commission scolaire Marguerite‑Bourgeoys; 2006 SCC 6	prohibiting religious weapons in school; freedom of religion	Deschamps J	None
Tranchemontagne v Ontario (Director, Disability Support Program); 2006 SCC 14	Jurisdiction of Human Rights Tribunals	None	LeBel and Deschamps JJ
R v Gagnon; 2006 SCC 17	Sufficiency of reasons given by trial judge	Bastarache J	LeBel J
Fidler v Sun Life Assurance Co of Canada; 2006 SCC 30	Damages for breach of contract	McLachlin CJ	Unanimous
GMAC Commercial Credit Corporation – Canada v TCT Logistics Inc; 2006 SCC 35	Bankruptcy	None	McLachlin CJ and Bastarache, Binnie, LeBel, Fish and Charron JJ.
DBS v SRG; LJW v TAR; Henry v Henry; Hiemstra v Hiemstra; 2006 SCC 37	Retroactive child support	None	Fish and Charron JJ
Robertson v Thomson Corp; 2006 SCC 43	Copyright infringement, licensing	None	McLachlin CJ and Binnie and Charron JJ
Pharmascience Inc v Binet; 2006 SCC 48	Professional ethics	None	Fish J
R v Morris; 2006 SCC 59	Aboriginal treaty rights	Deschamps J	Binnie and Charron JJ

== 2010 ==
Statistics

XXXXX	Majority or Plurality	XXX	Concurrence	XXXX	Other
XXXX	Dissent	XXXX	Concurrence/dissent	Total =	XXXXXX
Written opinions = XXX		Oral opinions = XXX		Unanimous decisions = XXX

Case name	Issue	Co-authored by	Joined by
XXX; CITATIONS [URL]	XXX	XXX	XXX
XXX; CITATIONS [URL]	XXX	XXX	XXX

== 2011 ==
Statistics

XXXXX	Majority or Plurality	XXX	Concurrence	XXXX	Other
XXXX	Dissent	XXXX	Concurrence/dissent	Total =	XXXXXX
Written opinions = XXX		Oral opinions = XXX		Unanimous decisions = XXX

Case name	Issue	Co-authored by	Joined by
Celgene Corp v Canada (AG); 2011 SCC 1 [URL]	Statutory interpretation of the Patent Act — Reasonableness of Patented Medicine Prices Review Board's interpretation of the Patent Act	–	Unanimous
R v Carron; 2011 SCC 5	Whether a superior court has inherent jurisdiction to grant interim costs in litigation taking place in the provincial court	–	–
Bou Malhab v Diffusion Métromédia CMR inc 2011 SCC 9	Whether the representative plaintiff in a class action for defamation must prove that each group member suffered personal injury	–	–
Ontario (AG) v Fraser; 2011 SCC 20	Whether separate labour relations legislation governing agricultural workers in Ontario infringes freedom of association under s. 2(d) of the Charter by failing to establish a meaningful process of collective bargaining	–	–
R v O'Brien; 2011 SCC 29	Whether trial judge's error in not excluding bad character evidence and in not specifically addressing that evidence in his reasons caused a substantial wrong or a miscarriage of justice	–	McLachlin CJ and Deschamps, Rothstein and Cromwell JJ
R v Sinclair; 2011 SCC 40	XXX	–	–
R v Topp; 2011 SCC 43	Whether an offender is required to prove an inability to pay a fine corresponding to funds fraudulently obtained — Whether the trial judge was bound to impose a fine in light of the accused's failure to explain what happened to misappropriated funds	–	Unanimous
Crookes v Newton; 2011 SCC 47	Tort of libel and slander — Whether a hyperlink to an allegedly defamatory article in itself constitutes a publication	–	Binnie, LeBel, Charron, Rothstein and Cromwell
British Columbia (Workers' Compensation Board) v Figliola; 2011 SCC 52	The appropriate scope of a human rights tribunal's discretion to determine whether the substance of a complaint has been "appropriately dealt with" when two bodies share jurisdiction over human rights	–	LeBel, Deschamps, Charron and Rothstein JJ
Newfoundland and Labrador Nurses' Union v Newfoundland and Labrador (Treasury Board); 2011 SCC 62	Whether reasons of tribunal satisfy Dunsmuir requirements for "justification, transparency and intelligibility"	–	Unanimous
RP v RC; 2011 SCC 65	Husband applying to terminate spousal support order on basis of his retirement and the market downturn, and whether the husband had established there had been a material change in circumstances since the original support order	Rothstein J	Binnie, LeBel and Deschamps JJ
LMP v LS; 2011 SCC 64	The proper approach to an application for variation of spousal support order under section 17(4.1) of the Divorce Act where support terms of agreement have been incorporated into an order	Rothstein J	Binnie, LeBel and Deschamps JJ

== 2012 ==
Statistics

8	Majority or Plurality	1	Concurrence	0	Other
3	Dissent	0	Concurrence/dissent	Total =	12
Written opinions = 12		Oral opinions = 0		Unanimous decisions = 6

Case name	Issue	Co-authored by	Joined by
Doré v Barreau du Québec; 2012 SCC 12	Judicial review and standard of review of law society disciplinary council; Proper approach to judicial review of discretionary administrative decisions engaging Charter protections	–	Unanimous
Tessier Ltée v Quebec (Commission de la santé et de la sécurité du travail); 2012 SCC 23	Division of powers and labour law; Whether stevedoring activities form part of federal jurisdiction over shipping under the Constitution Act, 1867	–	Unanimous
R v Mayuran; 2012 SCC 31	Defence of provocation	–	Unanimous
Society of Composers, Authors and Music Publishers of Canada v Bell Canada; 2012 SCC 36	Intellectual property and whether the use of previews on online music services constitutes "fair dealing" under the federal Copyright Act	–	Unanimous
Rogers Communications Inc v Society of Composers, Authors and Music Publishers of Canada; 2012 SCC 35	Intellectual property and the whether streaming of files from the Internet triggered by individual users constitutes communication "to the public" of the musical workers contained therein by online music services who make the files available for streaming	–	–
Entertainment Software Association v Society of Composers, Authors and Music Publishers of Canada; 2012 SCC 34	Intellectual property and whether the transmission of musical works contained in a video game through an Internet download is a communication "to the public" under the federal Copyright Act	Moldaver J	McLachlin CJ and Deschamps and Karakatsanis JJ
Alberta (Education) v Canadian Copyright Licensing Agency (Access Copyright); 2012 SCC 37	Intellectual property; Teachers making photocopies of excerpts of textbooks and other copyrighted works to distribute to students as part of class instruction, and whether elementary and secondary schools can claim the benefit of "fair dealing" exemption for copies of works made at teachers' initiative with instructive to students that they read the material	–	McLachlin CJ and LeBel, Moldaver and Karakatsanis JJ
AB v Bragg Communications Inc; 2012 SCC 46	Underage victim of cyberbullying applying for order requiring Internet provider to disclose the identity of persons using IP address to publish fake and allegedly defamatory online profile to identify potential defendants for an action in defamation, and whether the victim can proceed anonymously in application and seek publication ban on the contents of the fake profile	–	Unanimous
R v Cole; 2012 SCC 53	Whether a warrantless search and seizure of a laptop computer and disc containing Internet files breached accused right against unreasonable search and seizure under s. 8 of the Charter, and if so, whether the evidence ought to be excluded under s. 24(2) of the Charter; Whether accused had reasonable expectation of privacy in employer-issued work computer	–	–
Moore v British Columbia (Education); 2012 SCC 61	Whether school district discriminated against student by failing to provide necessary remediation for disability contrary to s. 8 of the provincial Human Rights Code; What constitutes meaningful access to education for students with learning disabilities	–	Unanimous
Reference re Broadcasting Regulatory Policy CRTC 2010-167 and Broadcasting Order CRTC 2010-168; 2012 SCC 68	Whether the Canadian Radio-television and Telecommunications Commission has jurisdiction under the federal Broadcast Act to implement a policy empowering private local television stations to negotiate direct compensation for retransmission of signals by cable and satellite companies, as well as the right to prohibit such undertakings from retransmitting those signals if negotiations are unsuccessful	Cromwell J	Deschamps and Karakatsanis JJ
R v NS; 2012 SCC 72	Whether requiring witness to remove niqab while testifying would interfere with her religious freedom under s. 2(a) of the Charter; Whether permitting witness to wear niqab while testifying would create a serious risk to trial fairness under s. 11(d) of the Charter	–	–

== 2013 ==
Statistics

8	Majority or Plurality	0	Concurrence	0	Other
3	Dissent	1	Concurrence/dissent	Total =	12
Written opinions = 12		Oral opinions = 0		Unanimous decisions = 4

Case name	Issue	Co-authored by	Joined by
Quebec (AG) v A 2013 SCC 5	Discrimination based on marital status under s. 15(1) of the Charter	–	–
R v Named Person B 2013 SCC 9	Informer privilege and evidence	–	McLachlin CJ and LeBel, Fish, Moldaver and Karakatsanis JJ
R v TELUS Communications Co; 2013 SCC 16	Whether the general warrant power under s. 487.01 of the Criminal Code can authorize prospective production of future text messages from telecommunications service provider's database	–	LeBel and Fish JJ
Penner v Niagara (Regional Police Services Board); 2013 SCC 19	Issue estoppel: administrative tribunal proceedings and civil proceedings	LeBel J	Rothstein J
Communications, Energy and Paperworkers Union of Canada, Local 30 v Irving Pulp & Paper, Ltd; 2013 SCC 34	Labour arbitration and collective agreement management rights clauses	–	LeBel, Fish, Cromwell, Karakatsanis and Wagner JJ
Sable Offshore Energy Inc v Ameron International Corp; 2013 SCC 37	Settlement privilege and disclosure	–	Unanimous
Divito v Canada (Public Safety and Emergency Preparedness); 2013 SCC 47	Constitutional challenge of provisions of the International Transfer of Offenders Act under mobility rights under s. 6(1) of the Charter	–	Rothstein, Cromwell, Moldaver, Karakatsanis and Wagner JJ
Castonguay Blasting Ltd v Ontario (Environment); 2013 SCC 52	Environmental law – Failure to report discharge of contaminant into natural environment	–	Unanimous
R v Cairney; 2013 SCC 55	Defence of provocation	–	Fish J
Alberta (Information and Privacy Commissioner) v United Food and Commercial Workers, Local 401; 2013 SCC 62	Whether legislation restricting the collection, use and disclosure of personal information under the Personal Information Protection Act violates expressive rights under s. (b) of the Charter	Cromwell J	Unanimous
La Souveraine, Compagnie d'assurance générale v Autorité des marchés financiers 2013 SCC 63	Provincial offences and strict liability under the Quebec Act respecting the distribution of financial products and services	–	–
Katz Group Canada Inc v Ontario (Health and Long-Term Care); 2013 SCC 64	Whether regulations effectively banning the sale of private label drugs by pharmacies is ultra vires on the grounds they are inconsistent with the statutory scheme and mandate of the Ontario Drug Interchangeability and Dispensing Fee Act and Ontario Drug Benefit Act	–	Unanimous

== 2014 ==
Statistics

7	Majority or Plurality	1	Concurrence	0	Other
5	Dissent	1	Concurrence/dissent	Total =	14
Written opinions = 12		Oral opinions = 2		Unanimous decisions = 5

Case name	Issue	Co-authored by	Joined by
Bernard v Canada (AG); 2014 SCC 13	Judicial review of labour arbitration decisions	Cromwell J	LeBel, Karakatsanis and Wagner JJ
R v Babos; 2014 SCC 16	Stay of proceedings and abuse of process	–	–
R v Hutchinson; 2014 SCC 19	Offence of sexual assault and consent	Moldaver J	Karakatsanis J
Reference Re Supreme Court Act, ss 5 and 6; 2014 SCC 21	Eligibility requirements to the Supreme Court of Canada	McLachlin CJ and LeBel, Cromwell, Karakatsanis and Wagner JJ	–
R v Vorkura; 2014 SCC 22	Reasonableness of trial verdict	–	Unanimous (oral)
R v Clarke; 2014 SCC 28	Sentencing and the interpretation of the Truth in Sentencing Act	–	Unanimous
R v Jackson; 2014 SCC 30	Admissibility of evidence under judicial discretion	–	Unanimous (oral)
Dionne v Commission scolaire des Patriotes; 2014 SCC 33	Occupational health and safety and the right to refuse unsafe work	–	Unanimous
Canada (Citizenship and Immigration) v Harkat; 2014 SCC 37	Constitutionality of the security certificate scheme of the Immigration and Refugee Protection Act under s. 7 of the Charter	Cromwell J	–
McCormick v Fasken Martineau DuMoulin LLP; 2014 SCC 39	Whether an "equity partner" at a law firm is engaged in an "employment relationship" under the Human Rights Code	–	Unanimous
Kazemi Estate v Islamic Republic of Iran; 2014 SCC 62	Public international law and sovereign immunity	–	–
Imperial Oil v Jacques; 2014 SCC 66	Whether a party to a civil proceeding can request disclosure of recordings of private communications intercepted by the state in the course of a criminal investigation	–	–
Thibodeau v Air Canada; 2014 SCC 67	Breach of language rights during international flight and conflicting legislation	–	Wagner J
Febles v Canada (Citizenship and Immigration); 2014 SCC 68	Convention refugees and exclusion based on commission of serious crime prior to admission to country of refuge	–	Cromwell J

== 2015 ==
Statistics

10	Majority or Plurality	1	Concurrence	0	Other
4	Dissent	3	Concurrence/dissent	Total =	18
Written opinions = 16		Oral opinions = 2		Unanimous decisions = 4

Case name	Issue	Co-authored by	Joined by
Meredith v Canada (AG); 2015 SCC 2	Whether the statutory limit on wages increases in the public sector under the Expenditure Restraint Act infringes claimants' rights to a meaningful process of collective bargaining under s. 2(d) of the Charter	–	–
Tervita Corp v Canada (Commissioner of Competition; 2015 SCC 3	Legal test for when a merger gives rise to a substantial prevention of competition under the Competition Act; Defence of statutory efficiencies	–	–
Saskatchewan Federation of Labour v Saskatchewan; 2015 SCC 4	Whether a right to strike is protected by freedom of association under s. 2(d) of the Charter; Whether prohibition on essential employees participating in strike action amounts to substantial interference with a meaningful process of collective bargaining	–	McLachlin CJ and LeBel, Cromwell and Karakatsanis JJ
Loyola High School v Quebec (AG); 2015 SCC 12	Proper approach to judicial review of discretionary administrative decisions engaging Charter protections; Whether decision of Minister of Education, Recreation and Sports requiring a proposed alternative program being entirely secular in approach is reasonable given the statutory objectives of the program and s. 2(a) of the Charter, and whether the decision limits freedom of religion under s. 3 of the Quebec Charter of Human Rights and Freedoms	–	LeBel, Cromwell and Karakatsanis JJ
Mouvement laïque québécois v Saguenay (City); 2015 SCC 16	Whether practice of members of municipal council regulated by a by-law and that consists of reciting prayer at start of each meeting of council is in breach of principle of religious neutrality of state and results in discriminatory interference with freedom of conscience and religion under the Quebec Charter of Human Rights and Freedoms; Whether a decision of the Quebec Human Rights Tribunal is subject to standards of review applicable to judicial review proceedings or to appellate standards	–	–
Theratechnologies inc v 121851 Canada inc 2015 SCC 18	Securities and statutory disclosure obligations	–	Unanimous
Yukon Francophone School Board, Education Area #23 v Yukon (AG); 2015 SCC 25	Whether trial judge's conduct and community involvement raised a reasonable apprehension of bias; Whether a school board can unilaterally decide to admit students who area not covered by s. 23 of the Charter	–	Unanimous
Kahkewistahaw First Nation v Taypotat; 2015 SCC 30	Whether eligibility requirement under the Kahkewistahaw Election Act requiring candidates for chief or band councillor to have at least a Grade 12 education violates the right to equality under s. 15(1) of the Charter	–	Unanimous
Strickland v Canada (AG); 2015 SCC 37	Whether provincial superior courts have jurisdiction to address validity of federal child support guidelines	Wagner J	–
Guindon v Canada; 2015 SCC 41	Whether proceedings under s. 163.2 of the Income Tax Act imposing monetary penalties on every person who makes a false statement that could be used by another person for purposes under that Act are criminal in nature or lead to the imposition of true penal consequences; Whether an individual assessed for same penalties is a person "charged with an offence" within the meaning of s. 11 of the Charter	Wagner J	Karakatsanis J
Ontario (Energy Board) v Ontario Power Generation Inc; 2015 SCC 44	Whether Ontario Energy Board's utilities rate-setting decision to disallow $145 million in labour compensation costs related to utility's nuclear operations was a reasonable; Whether Ontario Energy Board acted improperly in pursuing appeal and in arguing in favour of the reasonableness of its own decision	–	–
R v MJB; 2015 SCC 48	Reasonableness of trial verdict	–	Cromwell, Moldaver and Brown JJ (oral)
Saskatchewan (AG) v Lemare Lake Logging Ltd; 2015 SCC 53	Whether provincial The Saskatchewan Farm Security Act is constitutionally inoperative when an application is made to appoint a national receiver under the federal Bankruptcy and Insolvency Act, by reason of the doctrine of federal paramountcy	Gascon J	Cromwell, Moldaver, Karakatsanis and Wagner JJ
R v Hecimovic; 2015 SCC 54	Whether the trial judge properly considered the conduct of the accused, charged with dangerous operation of a motor vehicle, in light of all relevant evidence in determining whether the accused's conduct was a marked departure form the requisite standard of care	–	Cromwell, Wagner, Gascon and Brown JJ (oral)
Canadian Broadcasting Corp v SODRAC 2003 Inc; 2015 SCC 57	Intellectual property and copyright	–	–
Kanthasamy v Canada (Citizenship and Immigration); 2015 SCC 61	Whether decision of Minister of Citizenship and Immigration to deny relief to claimant seeking humanitarian and compassionate exemption to apply for permanent residence from within Canada was a reasonable exercise of humanitarian and compassionate discretion under the Immigration and Refugee Protection Act	–	McLachlin CJ and Cromwell, Karakatsanis and Gascon JJ
MM v United States of America; 2015 SCC 62	Whether extradition judge applied the correct principles in relation to double criminality and to own role in assessing the reliability and sufficiency of evidence; Whether extradition judge should consider evidence about possible defences and other exculpating circumstances in deciding whether to commit for extradition; Whether Minister of Justice gave appropriate consideration to the defence of necessity available under Canadian law but not available under the law of the requesting state; Whether Minister of Justice's decision to surrender for extradition was reasonable	–	Karakatsanis and Côté JJ
R v McKenna; 2015 SCC 63	Correctness of trial judge's jury charge	–	Unanimous (oral)

== 2016 ==
Statistics

6	Majority or Plurality	0	Concurrence	0	Other
4	Dissent	2	Concurrence/dissent	Total =	12
Written opinions = 11		Oral opinions = 1		Unanimous decisions = 2

Case name	Issue	Co-authored by	Joined by
Carter v Canada (AG); 2016 SCC 4	Motion seeking an order extending the suspension of the declaration of constitutional invalidity issued in Carter v Canada (AG), 2015 SCC 5	Karakatsanis, Wagner, Gascon and Côté JJ	–
Daniels v Canada (Indian Affairs and Northern Development); 2016 SCC 12	Métis and non-status Indians under s. 91(24) of the Constitution Act, 1867	–	Unanimous
R v DLW; 2016 SCC 22	Offence of bestiality	–	–
R v Saeed; 2016 SCC 24	Unreasonable search and seizure under s. 8 of the Charter	–	–
Wilson v Atomic Energy of Canada Ltd; 2016 SCC 29	Unjust dismissal of non-unionized employees under the Canada Labour Code	–	–
Lapointe Rosenstein Marchand Melançon LLP v Cassels Brock & Blackwell LLP; 2016 SCC 30	Private international law – Choice of forum	–	McLachlin CJ and Cromwell, Karakatsanis, Wagner and Gascon JJ
R v KRJ; 2016 SCC 31	Sentencing and s. 11 of the Charter	–	–
R v Rowson; 2016 SCC 40	Arbitrary detention, right to counsel and unreasonable search and seizure under the Charter	–	Unanimous (oral)
Morasse v Nadeau-Dubois; 2016 SCC 44	Offence of contempt of court	Gascon J	McLachlin CJ and Cromwell and Karakatsanis JJ
Alberta (Information and Privacy Commissioner) v University of Calgary; 2016 SCC 53	Privacy, production of documents and solicitor–client privilege	–	–
Windsor (City of) v Canadian Transit Co; 2016 SCC 54	Jurisdiction of courts	–	–
Canada (AG) v Fairmont Hotels Inc; 2016 SCC 56	Contracts and rectification of written instrument recording prior agreement	–	Côté J

== 2017 ==
Statistics

7	Majority or Plurality	2	Concurrence	0	Other
3	Dissent	0	Concurrence/dissent	Total =	13
Written opinions = 9		Oral opinions = 4		Unanimous decisions = 2

Case name	Issue	Co-authored by	Joined by
Ernst v Alberta Energy Regulator; 2017 SCC 1	Freedom of expression and Charter damages	–	–
R v Clifford; 2017 SCC 9	Similar fact evidence	–	Moldaver, Karakatsanis, Wagner, Côté and Brown JJ (oral)
R v Brown; 2017 SCC 10	Admission of fresh evidence and ordering new trials	–	Unanimous (oral)
Green v Law Society of Manitoba; 2017 SCC 18	Law of professions – Lawyers and continuing professional development	–	Côté J
R v Hunt; 2017 SCC 25	Constitutional law – stay of proceedings due to delay	–	Unanimous (oral)
Quebec (Director of Criminal and Penal Prosecutions) v Jodoin; 2017 SCC 26	Awarding of costs against a lawyer personally	Côté J	–
Douez v Facebook, Inc; 2017 SCC 33	Private international law – Jurisdiction	–	–
Google Inc v Equustek Solutions Inc; 2017 SCC 34	Injunctions barring use and sale of intellectual property	–	McLachlin CJ and Moldaver, Karakatsanis, Wagner, Gascon and Brown JJ
Teva Canada Ltd v TD Canada Trust; 2017 SCC 51	Commercial law – Bills of exchange	–	Moldaver, Karakatsanis, Gascon and Brown JJ
R v Robinson; 2017 SCC 52	[DESCRIPTION]	–	Moldaver, Karakatsanis, Wagner, Gascon and Rowe JJ (oral)
R v Millington; 2017 SCC 53	[DESCRIPTION]	XXXX	Moldaver, Karakatsanis, Wagner, Gascon and Rowe JJ (oral)
R v Jones; 2017 SCC 60	Constitutional law – Admissibility of evidence derived from unreasonable search and seizure	–	–
British Columbia (Human Rights Tribunal) v Schrenk; 2017 SCC 61	Discrimination on basis of employment	–	–
