= FAPI =

FAPI can refer to:

- Functional APIs
- Fellow of the Australian Property Institute
- Foreign Accrual Property Income rules (see Copthorne Holdings Ltd v Canada)
- Financial-grade API
- Pietersburg Civil Aerodrome (ICAO: FAPI)
- Fapi, the currency of China between 1935-1948
