= Bank of Montreal v Marcotte =

Ruling of the Supreme Court of Canada

- Supreme Court of Canada

Hearing: 13 February 2014 Judgment: 19 September 2014
- Citations: 2014 SCC 55
- Docket No.: 35009
- Prior history: APPEALS from Banque de Montréal c. Marcotte, 2012 QCCA 1396 (2 August 2012), setting aside in part Marcotte c. Banque de Montréal, 2009 QCCS 2764 (11 June 2009)(in French) Leave to appeal granted: Bank of Montreal, et al. v. Réal Marcotte, et al., 2013 CanLII 18832 (11 April 2013)
- Ruling: Appeals by the Bank of Montreal, Citibank Canada, the Toronto‑Dominion Bank and the National Bank of Canada dismissed and appeal by Réal Marcotte and Bernard Laparé allowed in part.

Holding
- 1. The law permits a collective action where the representative does not have a direct cause of action against, or a legal relationship with, each defendant.; 2. Different obligations flow from whether conversion charges are qualified as credit charges or net capital.; 3. The doctrine of interjurisdictional immunity does not apply. While lending, broadly defined, is central to banking, it cannot be said that a disclosure requirement for certain charges ancillary to one type of consumer credit impairs or significantly trammels the manner in which Parliament's legislative jurisdiction over bank lending can be exercised.; 4. The doctrine of paramountcy is not engaged. The basic rules of contract cannot be said to frustrate the federal purpose of comprehensive and exclusive standards, and the general rules regarding disclosure and accompanying remedies support rather than frustrate the federal scheme.

Court membership
- Chief Justice: Beverley McLachlin; Puisne Justices: Louis LeBel, Rosalie Abella, Marshall Rothstein, Thomas Cromwell, Michael Moldaver, Andromache Karakatsanis, Richard Wagner

Reasons given
- Unanimous reasons by: Rothstein and Wagner JJ
- Karakatsanis J took no part in the consideration or decision of the case.

Laws applied
- Civil Code of Quebec; Code of Civil Procedure, CQLR , c. C-25; Consumer Protection Act, CQLR , c. P-40.1; Bank Act, S.C. 1991, c. 46

Bank of Montreal v Marcotte, 2014 SCC 55 is a ruling of the Supreme Court of Canada. Together with Amex Bank of Canada v. Adams, 2014 SCC 56 and Marcotte v. Fédération des caisses Desjardins du Québec, 2014 SCC 57 (collectively known as the Marcotte trilogy), it represents a further development in Canadian constitutional jurisprudence on the doctrines of interjurisdictional immunity and paramountcy, together with significant clarifications on the law concerning class actions in the Province of Quebec, which is similar to that in operation in the common law provinces.

== Background ==
In Canada, holders of credit cards are allowed to use them to make purchases in foreign currency, and the conversion of the purchase price into Canadian dollars follows a similar pattern among all card issuers:

1. Conversion from the foreign currency through the interbank rate.
2. Application of a conversion charge by the issuer, which is disclosed by only some issuers to the cardholder.
3. Inserting the total amount of the transactions onto the cardholder's monthly statement.

In April 2003, Réal Marcotte applied to the Superior Court of Quebec for authorization to launch a class action against several financial institutions:

- Bank of Montreal
- Amex Bank of Canada
- Royal Bank of Canada
- Toronto-Dominion Bank
- Canadian Imperial Bank of Commerce
- Bank of Nova Scotia
- National Bank of Canada
- Laurentian Bank of Canada
- Citibank Canada
- Fédération des caisses Desjardins du Québec

Marcotte alleged that the defendants, contrary to the Consumer Protection Act in Quebec, failed to disclose the conversion charges as part of their "credit charge" as defined under the Act, which would have allowed cardholders who make payments before the due date to do so without paying such charge. In addition, he asserted that five of the banks failed to disclose the existence of the conversion charge, which was also in breach of the Act. It was estimated that the total amount of the charges in question was over $242 million.

The class action became a group of three because of procedural considerations:

- Amex sought to be removed because Marcotte was not an American Express cardholder. Bernard Laparé, who was, joined as co-representative and co-plaintiff. Amex, relying on a ruling of the Quebec Court of Appeal that questioned the validity of the class action, (Note: Bouchard c. Agropur Coopérative, 2006 QCCA 1342 (18 October 2006)(in French), which held that a representative plaintiff in a class action must have a cause of action against each defendant) sought to be removed from the action, but its application was dismissed.
- The Desjardins part of the action was separated, as the other banks (who were established under the Bank Act) sought to raise constitutional issues relating the relationship between the Bank Act and the Consumer Protection Act.
- The main action and the Desjardins action were heard jointly, on application of the parties.
- Sylvan Adams instituted a separate class action against Amex with respect to the same issues but also asserted that restitution was due to all cardholders even if they were not consumers. (Note: by virtue of Art. 1491 CCQ and Art. 1554 CCQ) This case was heard by the same judge that presided over the other actions.

The defendants sought to have the actions dismissed on several grounds:

1. All banks other than BMO and Amex sought to be removed from the action, as Marcotte and Laparé had no direct connection since they held no cards issued by them.
2. The conversion charges were not "credit charges" as defined by the CPA, but instead fell within the definition of "net capital".
3. Five of the banks, (Note: BMO, NBC, Citibank, TD and Amex, which came to be known as the "Group A Banks") which did not specifically disclose the conversion charge in their cardholder agreements, submitted that the charge was related to the exchange rate and not the interest rate posted on the monthly statements. The plaintiffs did not challenge the disclosure made by the four other banks. (Note: RBC, CIBC, Scotiabank and Laurentian, which came to be known as the "Group B Banks")
4. In any case, all banks submitted that, by paying their balances in full each month, cardholders extinguished any rights they may have had in the matter.
5. For any accounts created before 17 April 2000 (three years before the commencement of the action), the rules concerning prescription would provide that those cardholders were statute-barred from participating in the action.
6. The constitutional doctrines on interjurisdictional immunity and paramountcy meant that the COA did not apply, as the Act attempted to regulate activity that fell under the federal banking power, and it conflicted with existing federal legislation.
7. In the event that these doctrines did not apply, the Code of Civil Procedure in Quebec did not support a claim for punitive damages in the action.
8. The claims for reimbursement and punitive damages were not capable of being calculated with precision.

In its separate proceeding, Amex asserted essentially the same grounds. In its case, Desjardins submitted that payments by credit card fall within the federal power over bills of exchange, and is thus protected under interjurisdictional immunity and paramountcy grounds.

== Superior Court ==
Gascon J (as he then was), in decisions released on the same day, found for the plaintiffs in all three actions. In reasons that were closely interlinked, he held:

Case	Ruling
Marcotte c. Banque de Montréal, 2009 QCCS 2764	Once a class action has been authorized, it must be viewed from the perspective of the class rather than that of the representative plaintiff.; Conversion charges are "credit charges" within the meaning of s. 69 of the CPA. They did not constitute "net capital" since the foreign merchant never receives the conversion charge and it is not part of the exchange rate.; A finding of fact was made that the Group A banks failed to disclose the conversion charges. In addition, payment of the conversion charges by cardholders does not constitute a waiver of their right of action or of the protection of the CPA.; The prescription period for cardholders of the Group B Banks who formed their initial contract over three years before the class action was filed had not run out, as a new contract is formed every time a credit card is renewed. Prescription for cardholders of the Group A Banks was suspended until the banks began to disclose the charges.; The banks' constitutional arguments were rejected. Credit card contracts are not at the core of banking activities so the CPA does not interfere with the federal banking regime, and there was no operational conflict or frustration of federal purpose.; Reimbursement of the conversion charges (Note: as provided for in s. 272 of the CPA) was ordered as the appropriate sanction. Collective recovery was ordered, as well as individual recovery against TD and the Group B banks. The Group A banks were also assessed punitive damages of $25 per class member for failing to disclose the conversion charge.
Marcotte c. Fédération des caisses Desjardins du Québec, 2009 QCCS 2743	For the same reasons as in BMO, conversion charges were held to be credit charges under the CPA, and their payment by cardholders did not constitute a waiver of their right to reclaim the charges.; Only conversion charges imposed pursuant to contracts that were formed after April 17, 2000 were not subject to prescription, but it was held that renewing a credit card, which occurs every three years for Desjardins cardholders, results in a new contract being formed, which restarts the prescription period.; Desjardins adequately disclosed the conversion charges both before and after April 1, 2006and so was not in breach of sections 12 or 219 of the CPA.; Payment by credit card is not an activity that falls under the bills of exchange power and so interjurisdiction immunity cannot be invoked. In addition, paramountcy is not a concern, as no evidence was given of any federal law that may be frustrated by the CPA.; Punitive damages were not assessed against Desjardins because of the extent of the reparation for which it is already liable, the fact that its conduct was not reprehensible, the usefulness of the conversion service, and the exceptional nature of punitive damages.
Adams c. Amex Bank of Canada, 2009 QCCS 2695	Amex's argument that Adams lacked standing to bring the class action was rejected. It is irrelevant whether he knew about the conversion charge during the class period or whether a third party paid his monthly account.; Conversion charges were not part of the exchange rate. The cardholder agreement disclosed its existence separately, and the Financial Consumer Agency of Canada also treats such charges as being separate from the exchange rate.; Amex violated the general disclosure requirement imposed by s. 12 of the CPA, as well as. 219, which forbids the making of "false or misleading representations to a consumer." However, from March 2003 Amex was in compliance with those provisions.; Repayment of all conversion charges collected from consumer cardholders from March 1, 1993 to March 1, 2003, was ordered under section 272 of the CPA, which provides remedies for violations of the Act's general obligations (such as s. 12).; As in BMO, prescription did not bar the claims of any cardholders, and a new contract is formed when cardholders renew their cards. Amex's constitutional claims also fell for the same reasons expressed in BMO.; All cardholders, both consumers and non-consumers, are owed restitution of the conversion charges imposed during the period of nondisclosure. It was ordered on a collective basis in the amount of $9,561,464 for consumer cardholders and $3,536,432 for non-consumer cardholders.; Punitive damages to consumer cardholders were awarded on a collective basis under section 272 of the CPA, because of Amex's behaviour in the matter.

== Court of Appeal ==
The appeals produced varying results. In his reasons, Dalphond JA held:

Appeal	Ruling
Amex Bank of Canada c. Adams, 2012 QCCA 1394	The appeal was allowed and the order against Amex set aside in part.; The doctrines of interjurisdictional immunity and paramountcy did not apply to render the CPA inapplicable or inoperative, particularly since, unlike in BMO and Desjardins, Adams did not argue that the conversion charges were credit charges under the CPA.; As a finding of factor oe a question of mixed law and fact, Gascon J's order for restitution must stand, as Amex failed to demonstrate a palpable and overriding error.; The award of punitive damages was overturned, as the trial judgment failed to consider the punitive aspect inherent in collective recovery.
Fédération des caisses Desjardins du Québec c. Marcotte, 2012 QCCA 1395	The appeal was allowed and the order against Desjardins set aside.; As explained in BMO, conversion charges were held to constitute "net capital" within the meaning of the CPA. To hold otherwise would have consequences contrary to the purpose of the Act.; Even if such charges were held to be "credit charges", the appropriate remedy was to be found in section 271 of the Act (the court could refuse to order repayment if the consumer has suffered no prejudice), and section 272 does not apply.; It was agreed that the doctrines of interjurisdictional immunity and paramountcy do not apply.
Banque de Montréal c. Marcotte, 2012 QCCA 1396	The appeal was allowed and the order set aside in part.; The Plaintiffs were adequate representative plaintiffs against all of the Banks. As noted in the general provisions of the Code of Civil Procedure, what is needed by the representative plaintiff is not a personal legal interest but sufficient interest. The quality of the representative plaintiff is distinct from the interest of the represented members.; As in Desjardins, conversion charges were held to constitute net capital.; Neither interjurisdictional immunity nor paramountcy prevents the CPA from applying to the Banks, as credit offered through credit cards does not fall under the federal banking power. Paramountcy does prevent the Office de la protection du consommateur from receiving complaints against banks, as only the Financial Consumer Agency of Canada can do so, but the federal and provincial law can work together harmoniously.; As the Group B banks had disclosed their conversion charges, Desjardins was applied and the action against them was dismissed.; As the Group A banks did not disclose such charges, Amex was applied and they were held to have breached both the CPA and the CCQ. The fact that the conversion charge rate was reasonable and competitive was held to be insufficient cause for refusing to order restitution. However, the portion of the award assessed against Amex was overturned, as its liability had been already addressed in the other action.; Punitive damages were overturned with respect to all Group A banks other than TD.; The issues raised concerning waiver, prescription, and the absence of prejudice were dismissed. Waiver can be exercised only with full knowledge; prescription begins to run only upon discovery; and the absence of prejudice was irrelevant in this matter.

== Supreme Court ==
The appeals generally went in the plaintiffs' favour:

- In Marcotte (BMO), the banks' appeals were dismissed and the appeal by Marcotte and Laparé allowed in part.
- In Adams, Amex's appeal was dismissed.
- In Marcotte (Desjardins), Marcotte's appeal was allowed in part.

Marcotte (BMO) constituted the main opinion, written by Rothstein and Wagner JJ for a unanimous Court. Their opinions in the other two appeals, while adopting the main opinion's principles, also addressed matters unique to them.

=== BMO v. Marcotte ===
Issue	Reasons
Standing in class actions	The representative plaintiffs have standing to sue all of the Banks. This is authorized under section 55 of the CCP, and accords with the principle of proportionality under section 4.2 of the Code. It is also in line with the approach adopted in the common-law provinces. (Note: as noted in MacKinnon v. National Money Mart Co., 2004 BCCA 472, subsequently adopted in other provinces); In addition, the analysis of whether the plaintiffs have standing must have the same outcome regardless of whether it is conducted before or after the class action is authorized, because at both stages, the court must look to the authorization criteria of section 1003 of the Code. Therefore, the principle in Regroupement des CHSLD Christ-Roy (Centre hospitalier, soins longue durée) v. Comité provincial des malades, 2007 QCCA 1068 is to be favoured over that in Bouchard c. Agropur Coopérative.
"Net capital" and "credit charges"	As explained in Richard v. Time Inc., the CPA's objectives are "to restore the balance in the contractual relationship between merchants and consumers" and "to eliminate unfair and misleading practices that may distort the information available to consumers and prevent them from making informed choices."; Treating conversion charges as credit charges would force merchants to either disclose a wide range for the credit rate, which would confuse consumers or require unknowing cardholders to subsidize ancillary services that other cardholders choose to use that would benefit only some consumers at the cost of others and reduce the ability of consumers to make informed choices. Both s. 17 of the CPA and Art. 1432 CCQ do not require their classification as credit charges. Instead, they are additional fees for an optional service that is not necessary for consumers to access the credit.
Interjurisdictional immunity	The doctrine must be applied "with restraint" and "should in general be reserved for situations already covered by precedent." In the rare circumstances that it applies, a provincial law will be inapplicable to the extent that its application would "impair" the core of a federal power. Impairment occurs where the federal power is "seriously or significantly trammel[ed]", particularly in the current "era of cooperative, flexible federalism."; SS. 12 and 272 of the CPA, which deal with the disclosure of charges requirement and the remedies for breach of same, do not impair the federal banking power.; While lending, broadly defined, is central to banking, it cannot be said that a disclosure requirement for certain charges ancillary to one type of consumer credit impairs or significantly trammels the manner in which Parliament's legislative jurisdiction over bank lending can be exercised.
Paramountcy	Under Law Society of British Columbia v. Mangat, the Court held that even though forced compliance with a provincial law would not result in a breach of a federal law, it may nonetheless clearly frustrate the federal purpose and be held unconstitutional. However, the fact that Parliament has legislated in an area does not preclude provincial legislation from operating in the same area. "[T]o impute to Parliament such an intention to 'occup[y] the field' in the absence of very clear statutory language to that effect would be to stray from the path of judicial restraint in questions of paramountcy that this Court has taken since at least [O'Grady v. Sparling]."; Sections 12 and 272 of the CPA cannot be said to frustrate or undermine that purpose, as they do not provide for standards applicable to banking products and banking services offered by banks. Rather, they articulate a contractual norm analogous to the substantive rules of contract found in the CCQ.; The basic rules of contract cannot be said to frustrate the federal purpose of comprehensive and exclusive standards, and the general rules regarding disclosure and accompanying remedies support rather than frustrate the federal scheme.; In addition, sections 12 and 272 of the CPA are not inconsistent with sections 16 and 988 of the Bank Act and so do not frustrate the narrower federal purpose of ensuring that bank contracts are not nullified even if a bank breaches its disclosure obligations. As stated in Canadian Western Bank, "constitutional doctrine must facilitate, not undermine what this Court has called 'co-operative federalism'."
Disclosure under the CPA	The Group A Banks breached section 12 of the CPA by failing to disclose the conversion charges. The violation is not related to the terms and conditions of payment or to the computation or indication of the credit charges or the credit rate, which are specifically covered by s. 271 of the CPA. It is a substantive violation that goes against the CPA's objective of permitting consumers to make informed choices, and the violation results from ignorant or careless conduct.; Section 272 of the CPA applies, and the appropriate remedy is a reduction of cardholders' obligations in the amount of all conversion charges imposed during the period of nondisclosure. As there is an absolute presumption of prejudice for violations that give rise to section 272 remedies, the commercial competitiveness of the conversion charges imposed is of no consequence.
Remedies	The trial judgment with respect to punitive damages should be restored.; Under Cinar Corporation v. Robinson, an appellate court can interfere with a trial court's assessment of punitive damages only if there has been an error of law, or if the amount is not rationally connected to the purposes for which the damages are awarded.; The threshold for awarding punitive damages is not higher in the context of class actions whose plaintiffs are awarded collective recovery as opposed to individual recovery. The mode of recovery is not a factor set out in the jurisprudence for assessing punitive damages, and it would not be reasonable to include it as one.; The amount of punitive damages awarded in this case is rationally connected to the purposes for which the damages are awarded. Neither evidence of antisocial behaviour nor reprehensible conduct is required to award punitive damages under the CPA. Rather, what is necessary is an examination of the overall conduct of the merchant before, during, and after the violation; behaviour that was lax, passive, or ignorant with respect to consumers' rights and to their own obligations; or conduct that displays ignorance, carelessness, or serious negligence.; In this case, the Group A Banks breached the CPA without any explanation for a period of years; that negligence overwhelms their unexplained decision to start disclosing a fee they were charging consumers without their knowledge.

=== Adams v. Amex ===
Gascon J's finding of fact was allowed to stand and so his order for restitution remained. As Marcotte did not cross-appeal, the issue of punitive damages did not arise even though Marcotte (BMO) applied, as Amex had breached its section 12 obligations as well.

In addition, the CPA does not apply to non-consumer cardholders and so restitution is founded on the provisions of the CCQ, which the judge properly applied. According to the principles applicable to receipt of a payment not due, the basis for restitution is not the commission of a wrongful act, and the potential remedy is not damages. Rather, the basis for restitution is that there was no obligation to perform the prestations, and the remedy is a return of any prestations made without obligation, by virtue of Art. 1492 CCQ and Art. 1699 CCQ.

=== Marcotte v. Desjardins ===
It was agreed that payments by credit card do not fall within the federal bills of exchange power, and the natural limits of its wording prevent it from being expanded. (Note: quoting Canada (Attorney General) v. Hislop, the Court said, "Although this Court has recognized that the Canadian Constitution must be capable of adapting with the times by way of a process of evolutionary interpretation, that evolution must remain within the natural limits of the text.")

In addition, in applying Marcotte (BMO), Desjardins breached its obligations under section 12 of the CPA and Art. 1435 CCQ in not disclosing the existence of the conversion charge until it issued a monthly statement showing such charges. Reimbursement of such charges is the appropriate remedy, but the rules on prescription mean that some cardholders' claims are now statutes barred, as notice began upon publication of such statement.

The matter was sent back to the Superior Court to determine the appropriate procedure for effecting recovery. It was agreed that Desjardins' behaviour did not justify assessment of punitive damages, as its conduct was neither negligent nor careless.

== Impact ==
The Court held that federal and provincial laws can complement one another, and the fact that Canadian banks are federally chartered does not confer sweeping immunity from provincial laws:

With respect to the Banks' broader argument that provinces cannot provide for additional sanctions on top of federal sanctions, in our view this argument is similar to their argument respecting interjurisdictional immunity, whereby they seek a sweeping immunity for banks from provincial laws of general application. There are many provincial laws providing for a variety of civil causes of action that can potentially be raised against banks. The silence of the Bank Act on civil remedies cannot be taken to mean that civil remedies are inconsistent with the Bank Act, absent a conflict with ss. 16 and 988. In the present appeals there is no such conflict as the Plaintiffs are not seeking to invalidate their contracts.

The ruling is likely to affect other federally regulated businesses, as constitutional arguments may be ineffective to immunize them from class actions arising from provincial consumer protection legislation. It may also encourage greater provincial oversight, absent more active federal regulation.
