= Hryniak v Mauldin =

Case of the Supreme Court of Canada

- Supreme Court of Canada

Hearing: 26 March 2013 Judgment: 23 January 2014
- Full case name: Robert Hryniak v Fred Mauldin, Dan Myers, Robert Blomberg, Theodore Landkammer, Lloyd Chelli, Stephen Yee, Marvin Cleair, Carolyn Cleair, Richard Hanna, Douglas Laird, Charles Ivans, Lyn White and Athena Smith
- Citations: 2014 SCC 7
- Docket No.: 34641
- Prior history: APPEAL from Combined Air Mechanical Services Inc. v. Flesch, 2011 ONCA 764 (5 December 2011), affirming Bruno Appliance v. Cassels Brock & Blackwell LLP, 2010 ONSC 5490 (22 October 2010).
- Ruling: Appeal dismissed.

Holding
- The motion judge did not err in granting summary judgment in the present case, as summary judgment motions must be granted whenever there is no genuine issue requiring a trial.

Court membership
- Chief Justice: Beverley McLachlin; Puisne Justices: Louis LeBel, Marie Deschamps, Morris Fish, Rosalie Abella, Marshall Rothstein, Thomas Cromwell, Michael Moldaver, Andromache Karakatsanis, Richard Wagner

Reasons given
- Unanimous reasons by: Karakatsanis J
- Fish and Moldaver took no part in the consideration or decision of the case.

Laws applied
- Rules of Civil Procedure, RRO 1990, Reg 194 Rule 20 (Summary Judgment)

Hryniak v Mauldin, 2014 SCC 7 (Note: Decided together with the related case Bruno Appliance and Furniture, Inc. v. Hryniak, 2014 SCC 8 (23 January 2014)) is a landmark case of the Supreme Court of Canada that supports recent reforms to Canadian civil procedure in the area of granting summary judgment in civil cases.

== Background ==
=== Civil justice reform ===
Summary judgment procedures were first introduced in Canadian courts in the 1980s. (Note: With the exception of Quebec (which has its own procedural device for disposing of abusive claims summarily), all provinces feature a summary judgment mechanism in their respective rules of civil procedure.) (Note: Ontario introduced its procedure in 1985.) Ontario, after a study on the issues of access to justice, reformed its rules in 2010 to extend the powers of motion judges and masters for ordering summary judgment. This followed the introduction of similar measures in Alberta and British Columbia, all of which have been inspired by the reforms introduced in the English Civil Procedure Rules (Note: Part 24 - Summary Judgment, together with related Practice Direction) and the US Federal Rules of Civil Procedure. (Note: Rule 56 of the US Federal Rules of Civil Procedure)

=== The present case ===
A group of American investors (the "Mauldin Group") placed their money in the hands of Tropos Capital Inc., a company incorporated in Barbados that traded in bonds and debt instruments. At the end of June 2001, the group wired US$1.2 million to Cassels Brock (a Canadian law firm), which was pooled with other funds and transferred to Tropos. A few months later, Tropos forwarded more than US$10 million to an offshore bank, (Note: New Savings Bank A.D., established in Montenegro.) and the money disappeared. Hryniak (the principal of Tropos) claimed that at this point, Tropos's funds, including the funds contributed by the Mauldin Group, were stolen.

The Mauldin Group joined with Bruno Appliance and Furniture, Inc. (another affected investor) in an action for civil fraud against Hryniak, Cassels Brock and Peebles, a former managing partner of the latter. The group brought motions for summary judgment, which were heard together.

== The courts below ==
At the Ontario Superior Court of Justice, the motion judge held that:

- a trial was not required against Hryniak
- summary judgment should be dismissed against Peebles, as there were factual issues that called for a trial to be held
- summary judgment should also be dismissed against Cassels Brock, as the claim was based on the firm's vicarious liability with respect to Peebles

That's legal history. To go on a motion for summary judgment and have a finding of fraud, that's quite a hurdle to overcome.

Javad Heydary, the plaintiff's lawyer

Accordingly, he ordered Hryniak to pay more than US$2 million in damages. The ruling marked the first successful use of summary judgment in an Ontario fraud case.

The Ontario Court of Appeal heard the appeal together with others, in its first consideration of the 2010 changes made to summary judgment procedures in Ontario. While concluding that this specific case was not an appropriate candidate for summary judgment, the Court of Appeal was satisfied that the record supported the finding that Hryniak had committed the tort of civil fraud against the Mauldin Group, and therefore dismissed Hryniak's appeal. In arriving at that decision, the Court of Appeal devised a "full appreciation test" in determining whether the summary judgment procedure is appropriate in dealing with a case:

In deciding if these powers should be used to weed out a claim as having no chance of success or be used to resolve all or part of an action, the motion judge must ask the following question: can the full appreciation of the evidence and issues that is required to make dispositive findings be achieved by way of summary judgment, or can this full appreciation only be achieved by way of a trial?

Hryniak appealed to the Supreme Court, and leave to appeal was granted.

== At the Supreme Court of Canada ==
In a unanimous decision, the Court dismissed the appeal. In her ruling, Karakatsanis J agreed with the Court of Appeal's disposition of the matter, but argued that the "full appreciation test" placed inappropriate restrictions on the use of summary judgment:

[5] To that end, I conclude that summary judgment rules must be interpreted broadly, favouring proportionality and fair access to the affordable, timely and just adjudication of claims.

To that end, she gave guidance as to how it can best be used:

1. Our civil justice system is premised upon the value that the process of adjudication must be fair and just. This cannot be compromised.
2. The proportionality principle is now reflected in many of the provinces' rules and can act as a touchstone for access to civil justice.
3. The summary judgment motion is an important tool for enhancing access to justice because it can provide a cheaper, faster alternative to a full trial.
4. The Ontario amendments changed the test for summary judgment from asking whether the case presents "a genuine issue for trial" to asking whether there is a "genuine issue requiring a trial". The new rule, with its enhanced fact‑finding powers, demonstrates that a trial is not the default procedure.
5. There will be no genuine issue requiring a trial when the judge is able to reach a fair and just determination on the merits on a motion for summary judgment.
6. The interest of justice cannot be limited to the advantageous features of a conventional trial, and must account for proportionality, timeliness and affordability. Otherwise, the adjudication permitted with the new powers—and the purpose of the amendments—would be frustrated.
7. Where a party seeks to lead oral evidence, it should be prepared to demonstrate why such evidence would assist the motion judge in weighing the evidence, assessing credibility, or drawing inferences and to provide a "will say" statement or other description of the proposed evidence so that the judge will have a basis for setting the scope of the oral evidence.
8. On a motion for summary judgment, the judge should first determine if there is a genuine issue requiring trial based only on the evidence before her, without using the new fact-finding powers. There will be no genuine issue requiring a trial if the summary judgment process provides her with the evidence required to fairly and justly adjudicate the dispute and is a timely, affordable and proportionate procedure.
9. Not all motions for summary judgment will require a motion for directions. However, failure to bring such a motion where it was evident that the record would be complex or voluminous may be considered when dealing with costs consequences.
10. Absent an error of law, the exercise of powers under the new summary judgment rule attracts deference.

She also gave a rebuke to judges who expressed concern that the increased use of summary judgment would lead to more crowded dockets:

[79] While such an approach may complicate scheduling, to the extent that current scheduling practices prevent summary judgment motions being used in an efficient and cost effective manner, the courts should be prepared to change their practices in order to facilitate access to justice.

== Impact ==
While the original trial became complicated and spawned multiple appeals, the guidance given by the SCC has been welcomed as "useful" and "should give trial judges a greater sense of comfort when they attempt to simplify proceedings." It has also been noted that the SCC has granted a wide berth for summary judgment determinations with limited ability to appeal. In fact, the Court criticized the Court of Appeal for not going far enough in its ruling, which placed too much emphasis on the benefits of a conventional trial.

The fact that judges' decisions will attract considerable deference on appeal means that parties are well-advised to "put their best foot forward" in responding to a motion. As the Court of Appeal stated in an earlier case, "a respondent on a motion for summary judgment must lead trump or risk losing."
