= Caisse populaire Desjardins de l'Est de Drummond v Canada =

- Supreme Court of Canada

Hearing: 29 February 2008 Judgment: 19 June 2009
- Full case name: Caisse populaire Desjardins de l'Est de Drummond and in right of the Caisse populaire du Bon Conseil v. Her Majesty The Queen in Right of Canada
- Citations: 2009 SCC 29, [2009] 2 SCR 94
- Docket No.: 31787
- Prior history: APPEAL from Caisse populaire Desjardins de l'est de Drummond v. Canada, 2006 FCA 366 (8 November 2006), affirming Canada (Minister of National Revenue) v. Caisse Populaire du bon conseil 2005 FC 1563 (22 November 2005), affirming Canada v. Caisse Populaire du Bon Conseil 2005 FC 731 (20 May 2005)
- Ruling: Appeal dismissed

Holding
- 1. The definition of "security interest" in s. 224(1.3) of the Income Tax Act (Canada) does not require that the agreement between the creditor and debtor take any particular form, nor is any particular form expressly excluded.; 2. Whether a contract providing for a right to compensation (in Quebec) or a right to set‑off (in the common law provinces) also gives rise to a security interest within the meaning of s. 224(1.3) requires that the terms of the contract be carefully considered to determine whether the parties intended to confer on one party an interest in the property of the other party that secures payment or performance of an obligation.

Court membership
- Chief Justice: Beverley McLachlin; Puisne Justices: Michel Bastarache, Ian Binnie, Louis LeBel, Marie Deschamps, Morris Fish, Rosalie Abella, Louise Charron, Marshall Rothstein

Reasons given
- Majority: Rothstein J (par. 1–64), joined by McLachlin CJ and Binnie, Fish and Charron JJ
- Dissent: Deschamps J (par. 65–158), joined by LeBel J
- Bastarache, Rothstein took no part in the consideration or decision of the case.

Caisse populaire Desjardins de l'Est de Drummond v Canada is a Canadian income tax law case of the Supreme Court of Canada that has wide-ranging application to other areas of federal and provincial jurisdiction when dealing with cash collateral arrangements and security interests.

== Background ==
In September 2000, Les Entreprises Camvrac Inc. was granted a line of credit of $277,000 by the Caisse populaire du Bon Conseil in Notre-Dame-du-Bon-Conseil, Quebec, and in return it made a term deposit of $200,000 which was neither negotiable nor transferable during the line's term. In the event of default, it was agreed that there would be compensation between the credit agreement and the term deposit.

In November 2000, Camvrac defaulted on the credit agreement and later made an assignment in bankruptcy. As it had failed to remit source deductions with respect to income taxes and employment insurance premiums, which are subject to a deemed trust under the Income Tax Act (Canada) and the Employment Insurance Act, the Crown gave the Caisse notice to pay the amount owing to the Crown from the proceeds of the deposit. The Caisse challenged the recovery process, contending that its obligation applied only to the "proceeds from" the property subject to the trust, and that in reality it had not received any "proceeds from" the term deposit certificate.

== The courts below ==
Mme Prothonotary Tabib of the Federal Court of Canada, at first instance, held that the term deposit constituted a benefit to the Caisse, and by extension the "proceeds from a property" must be construed as including any set-off or benefit received in exchange or in consideration of the property. As she observed:

[22] Thus the value of the benefit conferred on the defendant through the realization on its security interest in the certificate of deposit constitutes the proceeds from the certificate of deposit, and must be paid to the Receiver General. To conclude otherwise would allow secured creditors to elude the clear intention of Parliament by accepting, in consideration of the property held as security and also subject to the deemed trust, earnings or instruments that are convertible into cash, albeit not monetary.

The judgment was sustained at a full trial in the Federal Court by Pinard J, and subsequently at the Federal Court of Appeal in a ruling by Létourneau JA. The Caisse appealed to the Supreme Court of Canada.

== At the SCC ==
The appeal was dismissed in a 5-2 ruling. Rothstein J wrote the ruling for the majority, and Deschamps J delivered a detailed dissent.

=== Majority ruling ===
The primary issue was identified as to whether the Crown was the beneficial owner of Camvrac's term deposit to the extent of its liability to the Crown, under the deemed trust provisions of the Acts. Rothstein J held that it was:

- s. 227(4.1) of the ITA declares that a deemed trust operates notwithstanding any "security interest" that may exist in property held by a taxpayer or a secured creditor
- s. 224(1.3) provides for an expansive definition of a "security interest"
- similar provisions exist in the EIA
- they are effective because "[f]or particular purposes Parliament can and does create its own lexicon," and it is open to Parliament to define a term in an area of its own legislative competence
- the current statutory régime was introduced to oust the previous patchwork of federal and provincial rules identified in Royal Bank of Canada v. Sparrow Electric Corp.

He further held that the right of compensation under ss. 1672–1673 of the Civil Code of Quebec (analogous to the concept of set-off in the common-law provinces) can fall within the scope of a "security interest" as defined, but not in every case:

[23] I do not think it is correct to make a blanket determination that a contractual right to compensation or a contractual right to set-off can never be associated with a "security interest" or that they are always associated with a "security interest". Whether a contract providing for a right to compensation or a right to set-off also gives rise to a "security interest" within the meaning of s. 224(1.3) ITA requires that the terms of the contract be carefully considered to determine whether the parties intended to confer on one party or the other "any interest in property [of the other party] that secures payment or performance of an obligation".

In the case at hand he held that it was:

[30] It was the five-year term and the maintenance and retention of the $200,000 deposit, as well as Camvrac's agreement not to transfer or negotiate the deposit and that the deposit could only be used as security with the Caisse, that created the Caisse's interest in Camvrac's property for the purposes of s. 224(1.3) ITA. In the absence of these encumbrances on Camvrac's deposit, Camvrac could have withdrawn the deposit at any time. Should it have done so and still been indebted to the Caisse, the Caisse's right to compensation would be ineffective because it would not be indebted to Camvrac at the time the Caisse had to resort to the remedy of compensation. However, in this case the terms of the agreements provided that Camvrac agreed to the encumbrances on its deposit of $200,000 so that the Caisse would continuously be indebted to Camvrac and that on default there would be effective compensation. It is the fact that the agreements secured the Caisse's right to effective compensation by conferring on the Caisse an interest in Camvrac's property that created a "security interest" for the purposes of s. 224(1.3) ITA.

=== Dissent ===
Deschamps J, in her analysis, held that the concept of "security interest" was not as broad as was expressed by Rothstein J:

- the English and French definitions ("security interest" and "garantie") were not identical in scope, with the French definition being less precise
- it is therefore important that the two versions be read together and that the meaning of the terms be harmonized
- under the Interpretation Act (Canada), the law of the province is the relevant source
- absent an express provision to the contrary, federal legislation must be interpreted in a manner consistent with the concepts and institutions of the legal system of the province in which it is to be applied

In that regard, the following observations can be made in how this should be applied in Quebec:

- the common law concept of security interest therefore corresponds, in civil law terms, not to a personal right, but to a real right
- in the CCQ, the concept of real right includes forms of security that have been consolidated in the concept of the hypothec
- the provisions relating to compensation fall within the CCQ's chapter on the extinction of obligations, and not in that relating to hypothecs
- since compensation has not been included in the list of examples of what constitutes a "security interest" under the ITA, the Caisse's right can constitute a security interest only if it entails a real right
- the automatic extinction of mutual debts is an effect of compensation, but it does not constitute the enforcement of a real right in the property in question
- the scope of the English term "security interest" is better expressed in French by the term "sûreté"

She would have allowed the appeal, and remanded the case back to the trial judge, as compensation cannot be considered to be a "security interest": the Caisse's contractual right may be set up against the Crown, because the Crown cannot have more rights than Camvrac itself had.

In response to Deschamps J's dissent, Rothstein J stated the following:

- mutual obligations must exist for compensation to be an effective remedy
- a contract containing a right to set-off can also confer on a creditor an interest in a debtor's property
- while compensation does not appear grouped with hypothecs in the CCQ, the issue is not whether compensation is a security interest: the list is non‑exhaustive, and so long as an agreement confers on a creditor an interest in property that secures the payment or performance of an obligation through compensation, the agreement will constitute a "security interest" within the meaning of s. 224(1.3) ITA
- an agreement that provides for security together with a right of set-off to realize on that security is not expressly excluded in any of the common law provincial personal property security statutes: what is required by them is a decision about whether a particular contract or agreement in a given case functions as a security interest.
- at both civil and common law, a claim, like a deposit, may be charged with a real right or become the subject of a creditor's interest in property
- even if the obligation to maintain and the right to retain are residual and apply only after the five-year term of the deposit has expired, they are nonetheless encumbrances that could affect Camvrac's use of its property
- the right of retention, the obligation to maintain and Camvrac's pledge not to hypothecate or use its term deposit as security in favour of anyone besides the Caisse were three of a series of encumbrances that created the Caisse's interest in or right over Camvrac's property to ensure that compensation would be an effective remedy.

== Impact ==
The SCC ruling has proved to be controversial. Many legal scholars and commentators preferred Deschamps J's reasoning to that of Rothstein J's.

As the ITA's definition of "security interest" is quite similar to that embodied in the various provincial Personal Property Security Acts, lenders may be exposed to attack, not just from the Canada Revenue Agency but also from trustees in bankruptcy, and secured creditors from their depositors, if security interests are not perfected by registration in the common law provinces, or published as a movable hypothec without delivery in Quebec.

This decision has the potential to have a significant impact on insolvency practice across Canada. By increasing personal liability, it widens the scope of liability where not only financial institutions, but all persons both dealing with tax debtors and receiving payments while a deemed trust exists, may be liable.

Cash collateral agreements commonly rely on what has been called a "triple cocktail" of set-off, security interest and "flawed asset". In effect, Caisse Populaire stands for the proposition that the first and third element of the "triple cocktail" automatically combine to form the second, even though the lender may regard them as conceptually distinct.

Derivative agreements such as those embodied in International Swaps and Derivatives Association contracts may also fall within the scope of the decision. Unlike in the United States, Canadian security interests in cash deposits are not perfected by control, as is allowed under Article 9 of the US Uniform Commercial Code. Registration is the only option, which can expose a counterparty to the risk of subordination to prior registered interests. It has been argued, however, that in the case of title transfers of securities (or cash in a securities account), provincial Securities Transfer Acts or other laws similar to UCC's Article 8 would ensure that the collateral taker should be perfected by control.

Lenders have been advised to take several steps to minimize the risk of exposure in such situations:

1. Agreements should be carefully drafted, and lenders should be fully aware of the overall nature of the arrangement between the parties.
2. Borrowers should be required to give appropriate representations, covenants and warranties regarding payments that, where unpaid, would result in the Crown obtaining "super priority."
3. Lenders may want to require that borrowers use third-party payroll services to ensure that wages and remittances are paid on a timely basis, as well as having the option to audit such payrolls.
