= Canadian National Railway Co v Canada (AG) =

- Supreme Court of Canada

Hearing: 14 January 2014 Judgment: 23 May 2014
- Full case name: Canadian National Railway Company v. Attorney General of Canada, Peace River Coal Inc. and Canadian Industrial Transportation Association
- Citations: 2014 SCC 40
- Docket No.: 35145
- Prior history: APPEAL from Canada (Attorney General) v. Canadian National Railway Company, 2012 FCA 278 (2 November 2012), setting aside Canadian National Railway Company v. Canada (Attorney General) 2011 FC 1201 (20 October 2011) (which set aside Order-in-Council 2010-0749 and restored Canadian Transportation Agency Decision No. 392-R-2008). Leave to appeal granted, Canadian National Railway Company, et al. v. Attorney General of Canada, et al., 2013 CanLII 18833 (11 April 2013).
- Ruling: Appeal dismissed.

Holding
- Where Parliament intends to limit the Governor in Council's authority, it does so expressly, but the only inherent limitation on the authority conferred by s. 40 is that the Governor in Council's authority is limited to matters already dealt with by the Commission.

Court membership
- Chief Justice: Beverley McLachlin; Puisne Justices: Louis LeBel, Rosalie Abella, Marshall Rothstein, Thomas Cromwell, Michael Moldaver, Andromache Karakatsanis, Richard Wagner

Reasons given
- Unanimous reasons by: Rothstein J
- Moldaver J took no part in the consideration or decision of the case.

Laws applied
- Canada Transportation Act (S.C. 1996, c. 10)

Canadian National Railway Co v Canada (AG), 2014 SCC 40 is a significant case from the Supreme Court of Canada in the area of Canadian administrative law, focusing on whether the standard of review framework set out in Dunsmuir v. New Brunswick applies to decisions of the Governor in Council of Canada (i.e., the Cabinet of Canada), and whether it has authority to vary or rescind an administrative tribunal decision on questions of law or jurisdiction.

== Background ==
=== Appeals to the Governor in Council ===
Under various statutes passed by the Parliament of Canada since 1888, the Governor in Council has been authorized to vary or rescind decisions taken by certain administrative tribunals of the Government of Canada. Current authority to do so is conferred under the following Acts:

Act	Scope
Canada Transportation Act, S.C. 1996, c. 10, s. 40	Either on petition of a party or an interested person or of the Governor in Council's own motion, vary or rescind any decision, order, rule or regulation of the Canadian Transportation Agency.
Telecommunications Act, S.C. 1993, c. 38, s. 12	On petition in writing presented to the Governor in Council within ninety days after the decision, or on the Governor in Council's own motion within one year after the decision, by order, vary or rescind the decision or refer it back to the Canadian Radio-television and Telecommunications Commission for reconsideration of all or a portion of it.
Broadcasting Act, S.C. 1991, c. 11, s. 28	Where the CRTC makes a decision to issue, amend or renew a licence, on petition in writing of any person received within forty-five days after that date or on the Governor in Council's own motion within ninety days after that date, by order, set aside the decision or refer the decision back to the Commission for reconsideration and hearing of the matter by the Commission, if the Governor in Council is satisfied that the decision derogates from the attainment of the objectives of the broadcasting policy set out in subsection 3(1).
Canada Marine Act, S.C. 1998, c. 10, s. 52(2)	s. 40 of the CTA applies, mutatis mutandis
Canada Marine Act, S.C. 1998, c. 10, s. 94(3)	s. 40 of the CTA applies, mutatis mutandis
Pilotage Act, R.S.C. 1985, c. P-14, s. 35(7)	s. 40 of the CTA applies, mutatis mutandis
Canada Oil and Gas Operations Act, R.S.C. 1985, c. O-7, s. 51	At any time, in his discretion, either on petition of any interested person or of his own motion, vary or rescind any decision or order of the Oil and Gas Committee made under the Act, whether the order is made between parties or otherwise.

Similar authority has been granted by provincial statutes to the Lieutenant-Governor in Council (i.e., the provincial cabinet). (Note: such as appeals from the Ontario Municipal Board) Such power has been described as "legislative in nature and ... no hearing is required in such cases."

The procedure is seen to be a significant barrier to participation in regulatory decision-making. Although there have been calls to abolish such routes of appeal as they constitute policy appeals subject to lobbying efforts, subsequent federal Acts have retained them.

=== The case at hand ===
At the beginning of 2008, Peace River Coal Inc. (a subsidiary of Anglo American plc) entered into a 30-month contract with CN to ship coal from its facilities at Trend, British Columbia (Note: approximately 25km south of Tumbler Ridge, British Columbia) Within the contract, it was stated that "CN fuel surcharge tariff 7402 will apply for the duration of this contract."

In February 2008, CN introduced a reduced fuel surcharge through tariff 7403 effective that April, but advised present contract holders that "Contractual agreements currently subject to fuel surcharge 7402 will remain in effect until those agreements expire, at which time we expect 7403 to be applied."

Peace River Coal applied to the Canadian Transportation Agency for an order establishing a reasonable surcharge with respect to its shipments by substitution of the newer tariff. (Note: under the authority of the Canada Transportation Act, S.C. 1996, c. 10, s. 120.1) The Agency declined, stating that the contract fell within an exemption for "rates for the movement of traffic." While PRC did not appeal, the Canadian Industrial Transportation Association (Note: now known as the Freight Management Association of Canada) (of which PRC was a member) petitioned the Governor in Council to rescind the CTA decision.

In June 2010, an order in council was issued rescinding the decision. In so doing, the order declared:

...the Governor in Council is of the opinion that while the existence of a confidential contract between a railway company and a complainant under section 120.1 of the Act, and the terms and conditions of such contract, are relevant to the question of whether the complainant will benefit from any order made by the Agency under that section, it has no bearing on the reasonableness of the charge and associated terms and conditions for the movement of traffic or for the provisions of incidental services that are found in a tariff that applies to more than one shipper and is not a tariff referred to in subsection 165(3) of that Act...

CN applied to the Federal Court for an order in the nature of certiorari, quashing the order in council and restoring the CTA decision.

== The courts below ==
=== Federal Court ===
The order was granted. In his decision, Hughes J declared:

1. as a matter of law, "the fuel surcharge as expressed in Tariff 7402 was part of the 'rate' charged to the shipper as contemplated by that Act,"
2. PRC sought to vary its contract with CN in order to incorporate the reduced fuel surcharge,
3. the Agency found that it lacked jurisdiction since it was being asked to consider and amend a contract,
4. CITA's petition to the Governor in Council asked it to ignore PRC's request that the Agency vary the contract and to simply ask the Agency to review the Tariff for "reasonableness" without regard to it,
5. the Order-in-Council expressly did not direct that the Agency require that PRC and CN amend their contract to reflect the amended Tariff,
6. s. 41 of the Act (which provides for appeals to the Federal Court of Appeal) does not remove from the Governor-in-Council the power to vary or rescind a decision of the Agency, even in respect of questions of law or jurisdiction,
7. the Governor-in-Council, in deciding matters of pure jurisdiction such as the issue here, must be subject to the Dunsmuir correctness standard on review, as there was no issue of public policy involved, and
8. the Agency was correct in dismissing the Application for lack of jurisdiction, and the Governor-in-Council was not correct in rescinding that decision.

=== Federal Court of Appeal ===
On appeal, the order was set aside. In a unanimous ruling, Dawson JA stated:

1. The Federal Court was correct in characterizing that the Governor in Council's decision did not decide the legal question of whether the existence of the confidential contract precluded Peace River from benefiting from any finding that CN Tariff 7402 was unreasonable.
2. Following the FCA's current jurisprudence, the Dunsmuir reasonableness standard of review applies to decisions made by the Governor in Council with respect to questions of mixed fact, policy and law.
3. The decision was reasonable, as it falls within the range of outcomes that are defensible in respect of the facts and law.
4. No decision is taken as to the Federal Court's finding that the fuel surcharge formed part of CN's transportation rate, as the issue is still live at the Agency.

== At the Supreme Court ==
The appeal was dismissed, with costs to the Attorney General of Canada and one set of costs to PRC and CITA. In a unanimous decision, Rothstein J declared:

- Policy considerations may be at the root of the Governor in Council's interest in the statutory interpretation issue, but that does not transform the nature of the question to one of policy or fact. The question of whether a party to a confidential contract can bring a complaint under s. 120.1 of the CTA is one of law.
- Under current jurisprudence, the only inherent limitation is that the Governor in Council is not empowered to address issues arising under the CTA ab initio: "Cabinet's authority is restricted to matters already dealt with by the Commission, and such matters must be orders, decisions, rules or regulations ..."
- Petitions to the Governor in Council are not restricted to issues of fact or policy. The Governor in Council has the authority to answer legal questions, which is properly supervised by the courts in the course of judicial review.
- The precedents instruct that the Dunsmuir framework applies to administrative decision-makers generally and not just to administrative tribunals, and is thus applicable to adjudicative decisions of the Governor in Council.
- In this case, the Governor in Council was interpreting the CTA. As the question of statutory interpretation involved the issue of whether the s. 120.1 complaint mechanism was available to certain parties, it did not fall within any of the categories of questions to which a correctness review applies. As such, the applicable standard of review is reasonableness.
- As the Governor in Council's decision was supported by the facts and the wording of s. 120.1(1), and it is consistent with Parliament's intention, it was held to be reasonable.
- The Federal Court of Appeal's observation that the issue of fuel surcharges constituted part of transportation rates was still a live one before the Agency was held to be correct.

== Impact ==
CN has been welcomed as a clarification of the extent to which the Dunsmuir framework applies to all administrative decision-makers, thus building on its decision in Catalyst Paper, and distinguishing it from Katz Group, which focused on the vires of regulation. It is an open question as to whether the "legislative capacity" review test originating in Inuit Taparisat may be overruled or confined to its own special facts as a result.
