= R v Hutchinson =

Canadian legal decision

- Supreme Court of Canada

Hearing: November 8, 2013 Judgment: March 7, 2014
- Full case name: Craig Jaret Hutchinson v. Her Majesty the Queen
- Citations: 2014 SCC 19
- Docket No.: 35176
- Prior history: Judgment for the Crown in the Court of Appeal for Nova Scotia
- Ruling: Appeal dismissed

Court membership
- Chief Justice: Beverley McLachlin; Puisne Justices: Louis LeBel, Marie Deschamps, Morris Fish, Rosalie Abella, Marshall Rothstein, Thomas Cromwell, Michael Moldaver, Andromache Karakatsanis, Richard Wagner

Reasons given
- Majority: McLachlin CJ and Cromwell J, joined by Rothstein and Wagner JJ
- Concurrence: Abella and Moldaver JJ, joined by Karakatsanis J

R v Hutchinson, 2014 SCC 19 is a decision of the Supreme Court of Canada on sexual assault and consent under the Criminal Code. The Court upheld the sexual assault conviction of a defendant in a condom sabotage case, holding that the complainant's consent to sexual activity with him had been vitiated by fraud when he poked holes in his condom.

In the case Craig Hutchinson, the accused, had engaged in sexual intercourse with his partner, who had agreed on the condition that he use a condom. However, unknown to her, he had poked holes in it, resulting in the complainant becoming pregnant. On trial, he was convicted of aggravated sexual assault. He appealed to the Nova Scotia Court of Appeal, which upheld his conviction, with the majority holding that the use or non-use of a condom was an essential feature of sexual intercourse, and that the consent to one didn't apply to the other.

The Supreme Court, applying sections 273.1(1) and 265(3) of the Criminal Code, established a two part test to determine whether a complainant had consented to sexual activity. It held that courts must assess:

1. Did the complainant agree to the touching, its sexual nature, and the identity of the partner (per s. 273.1), and if they did,
2. Was that voluntary agreement vitiated by one of the factors prescribed in s. 265(3)

With the section 265(3) factors being:

(a) the application of force to the complainant or to a person other than the complainant,

(b) threats or fear of the application of force to the complainant or to a person other than the complainant,

(c) fraud; or

(d) the exercise of authority.

With the Crown having the burden of proving beyond reasonable doubt that either criterion (1) is false, or that criterion (2) is true.

On the basis of this test, the majority upheld Hutchinson's conviction. However the Court, notably, refused to factor in the sabotage of the condom in the first branch of the test, rejecting the 'essential features' analysis of the Court of Appeal. The Majority held that accused cannot be held liable for sexual assault under 273.1(1) if the complainant consents to the specific physical act the accused performed on them.

The Court held that 273.1(1), which states "consent means... the voluntary agreement of the complainant to engage in the sexual activity in question", must be narrowly construed to avoid creating legal uncertainty. As such the "sexual activity in question" should only be interpreted to mean the specific physical act, and not to any other 'essential features' which the complainant may have based her consent on. Those, the Court said, would be best assessed under the "fraud" component of the 265(3) branch of the test.

Justices Abella and Moldaver wrote a concurring opinion, and dissented with majority on whether the condom sabotage should have been assessed under the first or second branch. They would have endorsed the Court of Appeal's 'essential features' analysis and considered it under the first branch.

== See also ==
- 2014 reasons of the Supreme Court of Canada
- Non-consensual condom removal
