= Canada (AG) v Hislop =

- Supreme Court of Canada

Hearing: May 16, 2006 Judgment: March 1, 2007
- Full case name: Attorney General of Canada v. George Hislop, Brent E. Daum, Albert McNutt, Eric Brogaard and Gail Meredith
- Citations: [2007] 1 S.C.R. 429, 2007 SCC 10
- Docket No.: 30755
- Prior history: Partial judgment against the Attorney General of Canada by the Court of Appeal for Ontario.
- Ruling: Appeal and cross-appeal dismissed.

Holding
- Same-sex couples should be treated the same as opposite-sex couples when determining what law applies to a survivor's claim under the Canada Pension Plan.

Court membership
- Chief Justice: Beverley McLachlin; Puisne Justices: Michel Bastarache, Ian Binnie, Louis LeBel, Marie Deschamps, Morris Fish, Rosalie Abella, Louise Charron, Marshall Rothstein

Reasons given
- Majority: LeBel and Rothstein JJ. (paras. 1-136), joined by McLachlin C.J. and Binnie, Deschamps, and Abella JJ.
- Concurrence: Bastarache J. (paras. 137-165)
- Fish and Charron JJ. took no part in the consideration or decision of the case.

Canada (AG) v Hislop [2007] 1 S.C.R. 429 , 2007 SCC 10 is a leading decision of the Supreme Court of Canada on equality rights under section 15 of the Canadian Charter of Rights and Freedoms and the retroactivity of Charter remedies. The Court struck down provisions in the amended Canada Pension Plan on grounds that it discriminated against same-sex couples. The Act had been previously amended after the ruling in M. v. H..

== See also ==
- List of Supreme Court of Canada cases (McLachlin Court)
- List of Supreme Court of Canada cases
