= Canadian Artists' Representation v National Gallery of Canada =

- Supreme Court of Canada

Hearing: 14 May 2014 Judgment: 14 May 2014 (decision) 12 June 2014 (reasons)
- Full case name: Canadian Artists' Representation/Front des artistes canadiens and Regroupement des artistes en arts visuels du Québec v. National Gallery of Canada
- Citations: 2014 SCC 42
- Docket No.: 35353
- Prior history: APPEAL from National Gallery of Canada v. Canadian Artists' Representation, 2013 FCA 64 (4 March 2013), setting aside a decision of the Canadian Artists and Producers Professional Relations Tribunal, (Note: in 2012, the Canada Industrial Relations Board replaced the Tribunal by virtue of the Jobs, Growth and Long-term Prosperity Act, S.C. 2012, c. 19, s. 532) 2012 CAPPRT 053 (16 February 2012). Leave to appeal granted, Canadian Artists' Representation/Front des artistes canadiens, et al. v. National Gallery of Canada, 2013 CanLII 51823 (15 August 2013).
- Ruling: Appeal allowed

Holding
- As scale agreements do not bind collective societies, there is no conflict between the provisions of the Acts in question.

Court membership
- Chief Justice: Beverley McLachlin; Puisne Justices: Louis LeBel, Rosalie Abella, Marshall Rothstein, Thomas Cromwell, Michael Moldaver, Andromache Karakatsanis, Richard Wagner

Reasons given
- Unanimous reasons by: Rothstein J
- Karakatsanis J took no part in the consideration or decision of the case.

Laws applied
- Copyright Act, R.S.C. 1985, c. C-42; Status of the Artist Act, S.C. 1992, c. 33

Canadian Artists' Representation v National Gallery of Canada, 2014 SCC 42 is a landmark case of the Supreme Court of Canada on the nature of bargaining in good faith. It also has an effect on the nature of negotiations for royalties that may be due to artists under Canada's Copyright Act.

== Background ==
=== Exhibition rights under Canadian copyright law ===
In 1988, the Copyright Act was amended to provide for an exhibition right "to present at a public exhibition, for a purpose other than sale or hire, an artistic work created after June 7, 1988, other than a map, chart or plan." Such fees were to be negotiated directly with individual copyright holders or their authorized agents.

=== Status of the Artist Act ===
In 1992, the Parliament of Canada passed the Status of the Artist Act ("SAA"), which provided for Canadian artists to be represented by recognized professional associations in negotiating terms of compensation on their behalf with federal "producers" who commission artists' services. Accordingly, Canadian Artists' Representation ("CARFAC") and Regroupement des artistes en arts visuels du Québec ("RAAV") have been recognized with respect to rights relating to visual artists.

=== The case at hand ===
In 2003, CARFAC and RAAV commenced negotiations with the National Gallery of Canada ("NGC") in order to establish a scale agreement under the SAA. They sought to include minimum fees for the use of existing works of visual artists. The NGC expressed reservations and stated that they wished to receive legal advice on that issue, but over the next four years proceeded to draft an agreement that included such works. In 2007, the NGC, obtained a legal opinion upon which it relied to state that CARFAC/RAAV did not have the authority to negotiate for such fees, as it did not have written authorization from each artist covered by the agreement. On that basis, the NGC presented a revised draft scale agreement from which all references to existing works were removed. After trying to negotiate further, CARFAC and RAAV filed a complaint with the Canadian Artists and Producers Professional Relations Tribunal that the NGC had breached s. 32 of the SAA by failing to bargain in good faith.

== The tribunal and court below ==
=== Canadian Artists and Producers Professional Relations Tribunal ===
The Tribunal found in favour of CARFAC and RAAV, ruling that:

- previous decisions by the Tribunal had recognized that scale agreements can include minimum fees for the use of existing works, and inclusion of copyright matters has become standard in the cultural sector;
- the SAA complements and supplements the Copyright Act, and that artists' associations can negotiate scale agreements under the SAA provided that those agreements do not bind collective societies established under the Copyright Act;
- under Royal Oak Mines, the Supreme Court of Canada stated that if a party proposes a clause in a collective agreement, or conversely, refuses even to discuss a basic or standard term, that is acceptable and included in other collective agreements in comparable industries throughout the country, a labour board may find that the party is not making "every reasonable effort to enter into a collective agreement".
- NGC had violated s. 32 of the SAA by failing to bargain in good faith; and
- NGC was ordered to comply with the SAA, establish a bargaining schedule with CARFAC/RAAV and provide monthly reports to the Tribunal.

=== Federal Court of Appeal ===
In a 2-1 decision, the Tribunal's order was set aside. In the majority ruling Noël JA stated:

- neither the Supreme Court in Desputeaux nor the Copyright Act recognize an artist association's right to interfere in transactions affecting copyrights held by its members;
- the Tribunal distorted the words used by Parliament, by asserting that the assignment of a copyright is a "provision of artists' services" under the SAA; and
- in consequence, matters relating to copyright do not fall under the SAA, and the Tribunal had no authority to compel the parties to negotiate such matters, so the NGC could not be said to be failing to negotiate in good faith.

In dissent, Pelletier JA argued that granting a producer the right to use an existing work was similar to the service provided by hotels and car rental agencies by allowing others to use their property, and therefore the Tribunal's interpretation of "provision of services" was reasonable. Because scale agreements do not apply to works for which the copyright has been assigned to a collective society, but rather only where the artist alone has the right to grant licences to use his or her work, there was no conflict between the two Acts. Applying Royal Oak Mines, he concluded that an objective assessment supported the Tribunal's finding that the NGC had negotiated in bad faith.

== At the Supreme Court ==
=== Immediate decision ===
In a rare move, judgment was given immediately after the hearing. McLachlin CJ declared:

The appeal is allowed, with reasons to follow.

=== Reasons given ===
In a unanimous decision, Rothstein J held that:

- where a tribunal is interpreting its home statute or statutes closely connected to its function, courts must interpret the question of jurisdiction narrowly;
- the Tribunal's conclusion that the "provision of artists' services" includes assigning or licensing a copyright was reasonable, and the two Acts in question do not conflict; and
- the Tribunal's finding of fact that the NGC failed to bargain in good faith was not unreasonable, and, under Khosa, it was not for courts to reweigh the evidence considered by it.

== Impact ==
Following the initial decision, the National Gallery issued a press release, announcing:

The NGC is ready to go back to the negotiation table after the written judgment is rendered.

Before the Supreme Court issued its ruling, concern was expressed as to whether the parties would have fared better if they had continued negotiations, as well as pointing out that a ruling in CARFAC/RAAV's favour would be expensive for the NGC and other galleries across the country. As well, it will also have serious implications for more obscure artists who may want to waive their minimum fee and negotiate freely with the gallery.
