= Roger T. Hughes =

Canadian federal judge (1941–2024)

Roger Thomas Hughes KC (September 16, 1941 – March 7, 2024) was a judge of the Federal Court of Canada.

== Biography ==
Born in Montreal, Quebec, Hughes obtained a bachelor of science from Queen's University in 1963 and a law degree from the University of Toronto in 1966. In 1968, he was called to the Ontario bar and, in 1976, to the Alberta bar. In 1984, he was appointed Queen's counsel.

Hughes was named to the Federal Court of Canada in 2005 and sat until 2016. He also served as president of the Patent and Trademark Institute of Canada and director of the Advocates' Society.

In 2016, he joined JAMS in Toronto as an arbitrator and mediator.

Hughes died on March 7, 2024, at the age of 82.
