= Re Rizzo & Rizzo Shoes Ltd =

- Supreme Court of Canada

Hearing: October 16, 1997 Judgment: January 22, 1998
- Full case name: Philippe Adrien, Emilia Berardi, Paul Creador, Lorenzo Abel Vasquez and Lindy Wagner on their own behalf and on behalf of the other former employees of Rizzo & Rizzo Shoes Limited v Zittrer, Siblin & Associates, Inc., Trustees in Bankruptcy of the Estate of Rizzo & Rizzo Shoes Limited
- Citations: [1998] 1 S.C.R. 27
- Docket No.: 24711
- Prior history: Judgment for the Attorney General of Canada in the Court of Appeal for Ontario
- Ruling: Appeal allowed

Holding
- 1. Employees terminated due to the bankruptcy of the employer are entitled to termination pay and severance pay in accordance with the provisions of the Employment Standards Act. 2. Statutory Interpretation cannot be founded on the wording of the legislation alone. The words of an Act are to be read in their entire context and in their grammatical and ordinary sense harmoniously with the scheme of the Act, the object of the Act, and the intention of Parliament.

Court membership
- Chief Justice: Antonio Lamer; Puisne Justices: Claire L'Heureux-Dubé, John Sopinka, Charles Gonthier, Peter Cory, Beverley McLachlin, Frank Iacobucci, John C. Major, Michel Bastarache

Reasons given
- Majority: Iacobucci, joined by Gonthier, Cory, McLachlin and Major JJ

Re Rizzo & Rizzo Shoes Ltd is a 1998 judgment from the Supreme Court of Canada regarding the priority of employees interests when a company declares bankruptcy. The judgment hinged on the interpretation of the Employment Standards Act and has been taken to mark the Supreme Court of Canada's adoption of the purposive approach to legislative interpretation. It has since been frequently cited in subsequent decisions of Canadian courts, nearly every time legislation is interpreted.

== Background ==
Rizzo & Rizzo Shoes Ltd. was a retail shoe store with 215 locations, 65 per cent of which were located in Ontario. Rizzo Shoes filed for bankruptcy; employees subsequently lost their jobs. The company paid all wages, salaries, commissions, and vacation pay through termination. The Ministry of Labour for the Province of Ontario audited the company to ensure that no further payments were owed to former employees under the Employment Standards Act (ESA). Proof of claim was submitted to a trustee, who subsequently disallowed the claim. According to the trustee, a company's bankruptcy does not constitute dismissal from employment; thus, the former employees of Rizzo & Rizzo Shoes gained no positive right to severance, termination or vacation pay under the ESA.

The case went before the Ontario Court (General Division) where the judge agreed with the Ministry of Labour and allowed the former employees to be paid. However, the Ontario Court of Appeal overturned the ruling and restored the Trustee's decision. The Ministry sought leave to appeal from the Court of Appeal judgment but discontinued its application. Following the discontinuance of the appeal, the Trustee paid a dividend to Rizzo's creditors, thereby leaving significantly less funds in the estate. Subsequently, the appellants, five former employees of Rizzo, moved to set aside the discontinuance, add themselves as parties to the proceedings, and requested and were granted an order granting them leave to appeal.

== Ruling ==
In the unanimous decision, the Supreme Court allowed the employees' appeal holding that they were entitled to the payments. While the plain language of the Act seemed to suggest that termination pay and severance pay were payable only when the employer terminates the employment, the Court held that the words of an Act must be read in their entire context and in their grammatical and ordinary sense harmoniously with the scheme of the Act, the object of the Act, and the intention of Parliament.

Iacobucci J. wrote:

Elmer Driedger in Construction of Statutes (2nd ed. 1983) best encapsulates the approach upon which I prefer to rely. He recognizes that statutory interpretation cannot be founded on the wording of the legislation alone. At p. 87 he states

Today there is only one principle or approach, namely, the words of an Act are to be read in their entire context and in their grammatical and ordinary sense harmoniously with the scheme of the Act, the object of the Act, and the intention of Parliament.

(Re Rizzo & Rizzo Shoes Ltd [1998] 1 S.C.R. 27, at para 21, quoting E. A. Driedger, The Construction of Statutes (2nd ed 1983), at p. 87)

The Court of Appeal had failed to read the language of the Act in this broad manner the Supreme Court held. It noted that the purpose of the termination and severance pay provisions were to protect employees, to recognize their service and investment in the employer's enterprise and to cushion them against the adverse effects of economic dislocation. To hold that (more junior) employees terminated prior to bankruptcy would be entitled to termination and severance pay while (more senior) employees terminated upon bankruptcy would be absurd, the Court held:

The trial judge properly noted that, if the ESA termination and severance pay provisions do not apply in circumstances of bankruptcy, those employees “fortunate” enough to have been dismissed the day before a bankruptcy would be entitled to such payments, but those terminated on the day the bankruptcy becomes final would not be so entitled. In my view, the absurdity of this consequence is particularly evident in a unionized workplace where seniority is a factor in determining the order of lay-off. The more senior the employee, the larger the investment he or she has made in the employer and the greater the entitlement to termination and severance pay. However, it is the more senior personnel who are likely to be employed up until the time of the bankruptcy and who would thereby lose their entitlements to these payments.

The Court also held that the legislative history of the termination and severance pay provisions and the other provisions in the ESA supported an interpretation that such benefits were payable to employees whose employment is terminated upon bankruptcy. The Court also ordered the Ministry of Labour to pay the employees' costs, since it had not provided the Court with any evidence as to the effort it made to notify or secure the consent of the Rizzo employees before it discontinued its application for leave to appeal to this Court on their behalf.

== See also ==
- List of Supreme Court of Canada cases
- Employment Standards Act
