= McCormick v Fasken Martineau DuMoulin LLP =

- Supreme Court of Canada

Hearing: 13 December 2013 Judgment: 22 May 2014
- Full case name: John Michael McCormick v Fasken Martineau DuMoulin LLP
- Citations: 2014 SCC 39
- Docket No.: 34997
- Prior history: APPEAL from Fasken Martineau DuMoulin LLP v. British Columbia (Human Rights Tribunal), 2012 BCCA 313 (19 July 2012), setting aside Fasken Martineau DuMoulin LLP v. British Columbia (Human Rights Tribunal), 2011 BCSC 713 (2 June 2011)(dismissing judicial review of McCormick v. Fasken Martineau Dumoulin (No. 2), 2010 BCHRT 347). Leave to appeal granted with costs in the cause, Michael McCormick v. Fasken Martineau Dumoulin LLP, 2013 CanLII 11313 (7 March 2013).
- Ruling: Appeal dismissed.

Holding
- McCormick was part of the group that controlled the partnership, not a person vulnerable to its control, so, in the absence of any genuine control of McCormick in the significant decisions affecting the workplace, there was no employment relationship between him and the partnership under the provisions of the British Columbia Human Rights Code.

Court membership
- Chief Justice: Beverley McLachlin; Puisne Justices: Louis LeBel, Rosalie Abella, Marshall Rothstein, Thomas Cromwell, Michael Moldaver, Andromache Karakatsanis, Richard Wagner

Reasons given
- Unanimous reasons by: Abella J
- Wagner J took no part in the consideration or decision of the case.

Laws applied
- Human Rights Code, R.S.B.C. 1996, c. 210; Partnership Act, R.S.B.C. 1996, c. 348

McCormick v Fasken Martineau DuMoulin LLP, 2014 SCC 39 is a landmark decision of the Supreme Court of Canada in distinguishing relationships of partnership from those of employment.

== Background ==
In 1979, McCormick became an equity partner at the law firm Fasken Martineau. Subsequently, in the 1980s, the equity partners voted to adopt a provision in their Partnership Agreement that required equity partners to retire as equity partners and divest their ownership shares at the end of the year in which they turned 65. A partner could make individual arrangements to continue working as an employee or as a "regular" (i.e., non-equity) partner, but such arrangements were stated in the Agreement to be the exception rather than the rule. In 2009, when he was 64, McCormick brought a complaint to the British Columbia Human Rights Tribunal arguing that this provision constituted age discrimination in employment, contrary to s. 13(1) of the province's Human Rights Code.

The law firm applied to have the complaint dismissed on the grounds that, as an equity partner, McCormick was not in a workplace relationship covered by the Code.

== The tribunal and courts below ==
=== British Columbia Human Rights Tribunal ===
The Tribunal, based on the factors of utilization, control, financial burden, and remedial purpose used in previous decisions, concluded that an employment relationship did exist and therefore s. 13(1) applied:

1. Fasken "utilized" Mr. McCormick to provide legal services to the firm's clients and to generate intellectual property.
2. Fasken exercised control over Mr. McCormick through the direction given by managing partners and client and file managers.
3. Despite the fact that the partnership involves sharing profits rather than paying fixed wages, the firm nevertheless had the burden of determining and paying Mr. McCormick's compensation.
4. Allegations that Fasken treated Mr. McCormick differently because of his age engaged the broad remedial purposes of the Code.

=== British Columbia Supreme Court ===
Fasken's application for judicial review was dismissed by the British Columbia Supreme Court. In her ruling upholding the Tribunal's decision, Bruce J stated:

[80] Mr. McCormick is an equity partner with very little control over his work life, his remuneration, and his work product. The firm, through its board and managing partners, dictates what occurs in the workplace and, to a certain extent, what Mr. McCormick does outside of the office. In this partnership an individual equity partner cannot determine his own wages and working conditions. Nor does he have the power, through his voting rights or his bargaining strength, to change the partnership agreement in ways that would be favourable to him. An individual partner is always subject to the wishes of the majority and the control exercised by the managing partners and the executive board. It is by these means that the firm represents a relationship with Mr. McCormick that is more reflective of an employer/employee relationship, favouring an overall finding that Mr. McCormick is "employed" by Fasken for the purposes of the Code.

=== British Columbia Court of Appeal ===
The BCSC ruling was reversed on appeal. In her ruling, Levine JA observed that that ruling misinterpreted certain provisions of the BC Partnership Act, and declared:

[50] There is no doubt that a partnership may employ other persons — Fasken concedes it employs associate lawyers and staff. In those employment relationships, it normally makes no legal or commercial difference whether the partnership is viewed as a separate entity or a collective of the partners. Third parties, including employees of the partnership, are generally entitled to the same rights and obligations as against a partnership as they are as against a corporation or a proprietorship, including protection from discriminatory employment practices. This result flows from the somewhat complex body of law governing the relationship of partnership as among the partners, and between partners and third parties.

[51] That same body of law makes it a legal impossibility for a partner to be "employed" by the partnership of which he is a member. In my opinion, neither a broad, liberal and purposive interpretation of the Code nor the analysis of the factual criteria of "utilization", "control", "financial burden", or "remedial purpose" can change that legal conclusion. No express exemption is required to exclude from the jurisdiction of the Tribunal under the Code a relationship to which, by law, the Code does not extend.

== At the Supreme Court of Canada ==
The appeal was dismissed with costs. Abella J, however, began her opinion with this observation:

[15] For the reasons that follow, I agree with the Court of Appeal that the Tribunal's decision was incorrect and that the Tribunal had no jurisdiction over Mr. McCormick's relationship with the firm, but do not accept that a partner can never be an employee for purposes of the Code. The key is the degree of control and dependency.

While different lists of factors have been employed by Canadian tribunals and courts to determine whether an employment relationship exists, "the consistent animating themes are control and dependency." In that regard:

- Relying on a formalistic approach to a master and servant relationship resurrects an unduly restrictive traditional test for employment.
- The test is who is responsible for determining working conditions and financial benefits and to what extent does a worker have an influential say in those determinations? The more the work life of individuals is controlled, the greater their dependency and, consequently, their economic, social and psychological vulnerability in the workplace.
- The approach taken by the Supreme Court of the United States in similar cases was endorsed.

In summary, she noted:

[27] Control and dependency, in other words, are a function not only of whether the worker receives immediate direction from, or is affected by the decisions of others, but also whether he or she has the ability to influence decisions that critically affect his or her working life. The answers to these questions represent the compass for determining the true nature of the relationship.

"While the structure and protections normally associated with equity partnerships mean they will rarely be employment relationships for purposes of human rights legislation, this does not mean that form should trump substance." Applying the control/dependency test to McCormick's relationship with Fasken, it was determined that "he was part of the group that controlled the partnership, not a person vulnerable to its control." Therefore, the Code did not apply, but it was possible that discrimination claims can be addressed under the provisions of the Partnership Act, under which "[o]ne of the duties partners owe each other is the duty of utmost fairness and good faith":

[48] This duty is an important source of protection for partners.... While this case does not require us to decide the point, the duty of utmost good faith in a partnership may well capture some forms of discrimination among partners that represent arbitrary disadvantage. That said, absent special circumstances, it is difficult to see how the duty of good faith would preclude a partnership from instituting an equity divestment policy designed to benefit all partners by ensuring the regenerative turnover of partnership shares.

== Impact ==
The Court doesn't want the Tribunal getting lost in the trees by focusing on the functional aspects of the relationship and just ticking a bunch of boxes. They want them to step back and see the forest.

--Gilliam Hnatiw, partner with Lerners LLP

McCormick was seen to be a landmark ruling that gives professional partnerships significant control over their ability to put time limits on their ownership. However, it also introduced a new way to determine whether someone is an employer or an employee. In describing the control/dependency test, the Court gave special mention to the factors listed in the U.S. case Clackamas Gastroenterology Associates, P. C. v. Wells:

- Whether the organization can hire or fire the individual or set the rules and regulations of the individual's work
- Whether and, if so, to what extent the organization supervises the individual's work
- Whether the individual reports to someone higher in the organization
- Whether and, if so, to what extent the individual is able to influence the organization
- Whether the parties intended that the individual be an employee, as expressed in written agreements or contracts
- Whether the individual shares in the profits, losses, and liabilities of the organization

The result in McCormick was case-specific, in that BC's Code was more restricted in scope compared to other jurisdictions such as Ontario's. However, the SCC's endorsement of a control/dependency test for determining partnership and employment relationships, together with its obiter observation about partners' duty of "utmost fairness and good faith" to each other, may encourage expanded litigation in this area. Other commentators have observed that the test can be used to determine whether an employment relationship exists in many different contexts (including independent contractors, shareholders, agents, or others that work for or with others but are not called "employees"), and non-equity partnerships could be the next battleground in defining their scope.

In the same week, the United Kingdom Supreme Court in Clyde & Co LLP v van Winklehof handed down a judgment that dealt with the same question as to whether a person was a "worker" within the scope of the Employment Rights Act 1996. While the result still revolved around the scope of the Act in question, it serves to remind that the determination of a partner's employment status may differ depending on the specific factual circumstances or applicable legislation. Significantly, the majority ruling concerning statutory interpretation by Lady Hale in Clyde & Co could be adopted in Canadian jurisprudence if minor changes are made to Canadian legislation.
