= Copthorne Holdings Ltd v Canada =

- Supreme Court of Canada

Hearing: January 21, 2011 Judgment: December 16, 2011
- Citations: 2011 SCC 63, [2011] 3 SCR 721
- Docket No.: 33283
- Prior history: Appealed from Copthorne Holding Ltd. v. Canada, 2009 FCA 163, [2009] 5 C.T.C. 1, 2009 D.T.C. 5101, [2009] F.C.J. No. 625 (QL), 2009 CarswellNat 1368 (21 May 2009), affirming Copthorne Holdings Ltd v. The Queen, 2007 TCC 481, [2008] 1 C.T.C. 2001, 2007 D.T.C. 1230, [2007] T.C.J. No. 335 (QL), 2007 CarswellNat 2808 (28 August 2007)

Court membership
- Chief Justice: Beverley McLachlin; Puisne Justices: Ian Binnie, Louis LeBel, Marie Deschamps, Morris Fish, Rosalie Abella, Marshall Rothstein, Thomas Cromwell

Reasons given
- Unanimous reasons by: Rothstein J.

Copthorne Holdings Ltd v Canada [2011] 3 S.C.R. 721, 2011 SCC 63, is a decision of the Supreme Court of Canada on the applicability of the General Anti-Avoidance Rule ("GAAR") in the interpretation of the Income Tax Act. ("ITA")

== The facts ==
Copthorne Holdings was part of a group of Canadian and non-resident companies controlled by Li Ka-Shing and his son Victor Li. It had purchased the Harbour Castle Hilton hotel in Toronto in 1981, and sold it for a substantial capital gain in 1989. The proceeds of the sale had been invested by Copthorne in Copthorne Overseas Investment Ltd. ("COIL"), a wholly owned Barbados company that carried on an active bond-trading business in Singapore.

Another company in the Li Group, VHHC Holdings, held directly (and indirectly through its subsidiary VHSUB Holdings) shares in Husky Energy Inc. By 1991, there was a substantial unrealized capital loss on that investment.

In 1992, VHHC Holdings was sold to Copthorne, and VHHC Holdings subsequently sold the majority of its VHSUB shares to Copthorne (inheriting the high adjusted cost base under stop-loss rules) which in turn sold the VHSUB shares to an unrelated purchaser at their fair market value, and thus realized the capital loss. This allowed Copthorne to carry the capital loss on the VHSUB shares back to shelter the capital gains from the sale of the Harbour Castle Hotel.

in 1993, Copthorne sold its holding in VHHC to its parent, thus making Copthorne and VHHC "sister" corporations. They, together with two other companies, were amalgamated and continued under the Copthorne name.

In 1994, amendments to the Foreign Accrual Property Income ("FAPI") rules in the ITA, which would have made COIL’s income FAPI, encouraged the Li Group to dispose of the business of COIL to another entity within the Li Group and to remove some or all of the proceeds of disposition from Canada. This was effected by a series of transactions that (in summary) involved the transfer of the shares of Copthorne and another related company to a new offshore company in the group, and redeeming certain shares of the company through a tax-free reduction of paid-up capital.

The Minister of National Revenue applied GAAR to recharacterize this payment as a deemed dividend, and thus subject to a 15% non-resident withholding tax plus related penalty.

== The judgments below ==
At the Tax Court of Canada, Campbell J. found that all elements necessary to apply the GAAR had been established: a series of transactions, a tax benefit, an avoidance transaction, and the abusiveness of the transaction.

This ruling was affirmed by the Federal Court of Appeal, but Ryer J.A. noted that the Tax Court judge had applied too stringent a legal test to assessing the series of transactions. He concluded that a "strong nexus" need not exist between a series and a related transaction to find that the related transaction is part of the series. Instead, the series need only be a "motivating factor" for the related transaction (para. 49). Given the Tax Court judge’s finding that a strong nexus existed, he concluded that this less stringent motivating factor test was clearly met. He also upheld the conclusion of the Tax Court judge that the avoidance transaction had been abusive, but differed in his application of the GAAR.

== Decision of the Supreme Court of Canada ==
The decision of the Federal Court of Appeal was affirmed unanimously by the Court, together with clarification as to the proper analysis and application intended for GAAR.

GAAR is a provision of last resort, and, before being applied to deny a tax benefit, a Court must conduct an objective, thorough and step-by-step analysis. After concisely summarizing the facts and his analysis on the existence of a tax benefit and an avoidance transaction, Justice Rothstein focused on the question whether there was an abusive transaction. The majority of his lengthy reasons provide a template for the type of detailed analysis that is expected in a GAAR appeal.

In order to determine whether a transaction is an abuse or misuse of the Act, a court must first determine the object, spirit or purpose of the provisions that are relied on for the tax benefit, having regard to the scheme of the Act, the relevant provisions and permissible extrinsic aids. While an avoidance transaction may operate alone to produce a tax benefit, it may also operate as part of a series of transactions that results in the tax benefit. While the focus must be on the transaction, where it is part of a series, it must be viewed in the context of the series to enable the court to determine whether abusive tax avoidance has occurred. In such a case, whether a transaction is abusive will only become apparent when it is considered in the context of the series of which it is a part and the overall result that is achieved.

The analysis will lead to a finding of abusive tax avoidance:

- where the transaction achieves an outcome the statutory provision was intended to prevent;
- where the transaction defeats the underlying rationale of the provision; or
- where the transaction circumvents the provision in a manner that frustrates or defeats its object, spirit or purpose.

These considerations are not independent of one another and may overlap.

== Significance ==
Following on the Court's previous rulings in 2005 in Canada Trustco Mortgage Co. v. Canada, and in 2009 in Lipson v. Canada, GAAR has a firm basis in the application of Canadian income tax law in the analysis of abusive tax transactions. There is, however, debate as to whether this decision will lead to predictability and consistency in GAAR analysis.

Copthorne also imported into Canadian tax jurisprudence the SCC's framework for reversing its own decisions, as noted by Rothstein J.:

[57] Trustco is a recent decision of this Court. Reversing a recent decision "is a step not to be lightly undertaken". Before a court will entertain reversing a recently decided decision, there must be substantial reasons to believe the precedent was wrongly decided. In this case, Copthorne has not met the "high threshold for reversing a precedent" and it is appropriate to reaffirm the Trustco interpretation of s. 248(10).

There is debate as to whether Canada Trustco was more in the nature of dicta, whereas Fraser dealt with the reversal of ratio decidendi.

The Court also emphasizes the importance in tax planning of going beyond the mechanical application of particular provisions of the Act as if it were a mere instruction manual or limited book of rules.

== See also ==
- List of Supreme Court of Canada cases (McLachlin Court)
