= Marshall Rothstein =

Justice of the Supreme Court of Canada

Marshall E. Rothstein CC KC

Puisne Justice of the Supreme Court of Canada
- In office 1 March 2006 – 31 August 2015
- Nominated by: Stephen Harper
- Preceded by: John C. Major
- Succeeded by: Russell Brown

Personal details
- Born: 25 December 1940 (age 85) Winnipeg, Manitoba
- Spouse: Sheila Dorfman
- Awards: Order of Canada

Marshall Rothstein CC KC (born 25 December 1940) is a former Puisne Justice of the Supreme Court of Canada.

== Early life ==
Marshall Rothstein was born in Winnipeg, Manitoba, to Jewish parents who had emigrated from Eastern Europe. He received a Bachelor of Commerce in 1962 and an LL.B. in 1966 from the University of Manitoba. Marshall was the only child. His mother, a school teacher, was Russian. His father, a bookkeeper and merchant, was Polish. They met in Canada and settled in Winnipeg, where Marshall was born during the war years. Marshall's father wanted him to be an actuary. Marshall pursued a bachelor's degree in commerce at the University of Manitoba, but, in his final year, he took a course on commercial law and became fascinated by the law and decided on the law as a career path instead.

Rothstein worked in food service on a passenger train while between semesters at university. The experience of being the lowest-ranked employee while interacting with a variety of people from different backgrounds influenced the development of Rothstein's character such that he screened job applicants and clerkship candidates for life experiences that taught them the value of hard work and character. Asked about it in an interview with Canada's CPAC public affairs station, Rothstein stated:

"As lawyers, and as judges, we tend to live in a pretty enclosed world. Most people in the world are out there slogging out very, very difficult physical work - sometimes dangerous work. The experience that I had working in the dining car made me realize that there was a different life out there and that as a lawyer I was going to be lucky that I wasn't going to have to work outside, and in inclement weather, or perhaps in dangerous situations, or for that matter in the dining car. In those days we weren't allowed to sit down, if there was even one customer in the dining car, we had to stand all day with short breaks, and I want to make sure that my law clerks or the people I'm working with have some idea about what that life is about."

Upon graduating from the University of Manitoba and passing his bar exams, Rothstein went to work for the firm of Thorvaldson, Eggerston, Saunders and Mauro. Rothstein specialized in transportation law and taught for several years at the University of Manitoba. In 1992, Brian Mulroney appointed him to the Federal Court Trial Division and in 1999 was elevated to the Federal Court of Appeal in Ottawa. In 2006, he was Stephen Harper's appointment to the Supreme Court and became the first justice to have his appointment publicly scrutinized when he appeared before a parliamentary committee.

He was called to the Bar of Manitoba in 1966. Also in 1966, he married Sheila Dorfman, a Montreal doctor. They have four children: Ronald, Douglas, Tracey and Robert.

== Career ==
Marshall Rothstein practiced law primarily in the fields of transportation and competition law and was a partner with the Winnipeg law firm of Aikins, MacAulay & Thorvaldson. From 1970 to 1992, he was a lecturer in transportation law at the University of Manitoba. In 1992, he was appointed to the Federal Court Trial Division, ex officio of the Court of Appeal, and appointed to the Court Martial Appeal Court of Canada. In 1999, he was appointed a Judge of the Federal Court of Canada, Appeal Division.

He wrote 578 judgments for the Federal Court and 324 judgments for the Federal Court of Appeal.

In 2017, he was appointed a Companion of the Order of Canada by Governor General David Johnston for "his eminent service as a jurist, notably on the Supreme Court of Canada, and for his dedication to legal education."

=== Supreme Court ===
Rothstein was one of the candidates (the others being Peter MacKinnon and Constance Hunt) recommended by a committee convened by the outgoing Liberal government to be appointed to the Supreme Court of Canada, following John C. Major's retirement from the bench in early 2006. Prime Minister Stephen Harper chose Rothstein for the Governor General to appoint to the top court.

Rothstein's appointment by the Conservative government was criticized because of his unilingualism. He was the only justice of the Supreme Court who was not bilingual, prior to the 2011 appointment of Justice Michael Moldaver.

Many Canadian conservatives had long been critical of the process of appointing judges to the Supreme Court of Canada, wherein the Prime Minister is the sole advisor of the Governor General in the matter, and though he or she consults legal experts, no input is given from other (especially opposition) politicians. Conservative Leader Stephen Harper had thus made a promise to "reform" the appointment process during previous elections.

Shortly after Prime Minister Harper put Rothstein's name forward, Harper acted on his promise to create an Ad Hoc Committee to Review a Nominee for the Supreme Court of Canada, a new creation intended to allow the nominee to face questioning by members of the Canadian Parliament, similar in spirit to the Senate judicial hearings that occur as part of the Supreme Court appointment process in the United States. The Panel was chaired by constitutional law professor Peter Hogg. The new procedures replaced a reformed appointment process introduced by the previous Liberal government, but which had not yet been applied.

The panel was controversial. Many conservative critics argued it did not go nearly far enough, while many liberal critics argued it went too far. Harper made it clear that while the ad hoc committee would be able to question the nominee, it did not have the power to veto the nominee – unlike the American panels which had the power to do both. Furthermore, the MPs on the panel were asked to refrain from asking about Rothstein's personal opinions on moral issues or subjects of possible future rulings. One matter relating to Rothstein's judicial philosophy did emerge from the hearings. Rothstein was generally considered to be the most conservative of the three nominees with respect to the role he believed judges play in the political system. The hearing lent support to that view: when asked about his judicial philosophy, Rothstein stated "I'm not sure that I would be comfortable thinking that judges should be advancing the law with a social agenda in mind. It seems to me that the social agenda is the agenda for Parliament and if Parliament wants to advance the law in social terms, that's their job."

== Retirement ==
On 24 April 2015, Rothstein announced his retirement from the Supreme Court, effective 31 August 2015. Following his retirement from the Court he resumed practice at Hunter Litigation Chambers in Vancouver British Columbia. Rothstein is currently a partner in the Tax Litigation group in Osler's Vancouver office.

== See also ==
- Reasons of the Supreme Court of Canada by Justice Rothstein
