= 2009 reasons of the Supreme Court of Canada =

The table below lists the decisions (known as reasons) delivered from the bench by the Supreme Court of Canada during 2009. The table illustrates what reasons were filed by each justice in each case, and which justices joined each reason. This list, however, does not include reasons on motions.

== Reasons ==
Delivered the Court's reason
Joined the Court's reason
Filed a concurrence
Joined a concurrence
Filed a dissent
Joined a dissent
Filed a concurrence/dissent
Joined a concurrence/dissent
Did not participate in the judgment
Did not participate in the final disposition of the judgment
Not a member of the Court at the time of hearing or delivering
- Decisions that do not note a Justice delivering the Court's reason are per coram.
- Multiple concurrences and dissents within a case are numbered, with joining votes numbered accordingly. Justices occasionally join multiple reasons in a single case; each vote is subdivided accordingly.
- Multiple unnumbered reasons are jointly written or delivered.
- Decisions that are given orally from the bench are denoted by a "V"; per coram decisions delivered orally from the bench only note a "V" on the most senior justice on the panel.
- An asterisk ( * ) in the Court's opinion denotes that it was only a majority in part or a plurality.

Case name	Argued	Decided	McLachlin	Binnie	LeBel	Deschamps	Fish	Abella	Charron	Rothstein	Cromwell
Lipson v Canada, 2009 SCC 1, [2009] 1 S.C.R. 3	April 23, 2009	January 8, 2009		1		1				2
R v Strecko, 2009 SCC 2, [2009] 1 S.C.R. 64		January 14, 2009			V
R v McNeil, 2009 SCC 3, [2009] 1 S.C.R. 66	March 19, 2008	January 16, 2009
R v Khela, 2009 SCC 4, [2009] 1 S.C.R. 104	March 28, 2008	January 22, 2009
R v Smith, 2009 SCC 5, [2009] 1 S.C.R. 146	March 28, 2008	January 22, 2009
Shafron v KRG Insurance Brokers (Western) Inc, 2009 SCC 6, [2009] 1 S.C.R. 157	October 16, 2008	January 23, 2009
Ravndahl v Saskatchewan, 2009 SCC 7, [2009] 1 S.C.R. 181	December 17, 2008	January 29, 2009
DesRochers v Canada (Industry), 2009 SCC 8, [2009] 1 S.C.R. 194	May 20, 2008	February 5, 2009
Ermineskin Indian Band and Nation v Canada, 2009 SCC 9, [2009] 1 S.C.R. 222	May 22, 2008	February 13, 2009
Rick v Brandsema, 2009 SCC 10, [2009] 1 S.C.R. 295	October 14, 2008	February 19, 2009
Case name	Argued	Decided	McLachlin	Binnie	LeBel	Deschamps	Fish	Abella	Charron	Rothstein	Cromwell
Teck Cominco Metals Ltd v Lloyd's Underwriters, 2009 SCC 11, [2009] 1 S.C.R. 321	November 17, 2008	February 20, 2009
Canada (Citizenship and Immigration) v Khosa, 2009 SCC 12, [2009] 1 S.C.R. 339	March 20, 2008	February 6, 2009				1				2
R v Royz, 2009 SCC 13		March 25, 2009		V
R v SJL, 2009 SCC 13	December 16, 2008	March 27, 2009
BMP Global Distribution Inc v Bank of Nova Scotia, 2009 SCC 15, [2009] 1 S.C.R. 504	May 15, 2008	April 2, 2009
Canada Post Corp v Lépine, 2009 SCC 16, [2009] 1 S.C.R. 549	November 17, 2008	April 2, 2009
R v Patrick, 2009 SCC 17, [2009] 1 S.C.R. 579	October 10, 2008	April 9, 2009
Chatterjee v Ontario (AG), 2009 SCC 19, [2009] 1 S.C.R. 624	November 12, 2008	April 17, 2009
United Parcel Service Canada Ltd v Canada, 2009 SCC 20, [2009] 1 S.C.R. 657	January 15, 2009	April 23, 2009
R v Middleton, 2009 SCC 21, [2009] 1 S.C.R. 674	January 20, 2009	May 22, 2009
Case name	Argued	Decided	McLachlin	Binnie	LeBel	Deschamps	Fish	Abella	Charron	Rothstein	Cromwell
R v Van, 2009 SCC 22, [2009] 1 S.C.R. 716	January 13, 2009	May 28, 2009
R v Craig, 2009 SCC 23, [2009] 1 S.C.R. 762	November 13, 2009	May 29, 2009
R v Ouellette, 2009 SCC 24, [2009] 1 S.C.R. 818	November 13, 2009	May 29, 2009	1				2			1
R v Nguyen, 2009 SCC 25, [2009] 1 S.C.R. 826	November 13, 2009	May 29, 2009
R v Godin, 2009 SCC 26, [2009] 2 S.C.R. 3	February 12, 2009	June 4, 2009
R v Ellard, 2009 SCC 27, [2009] 2 S.C.R. 19	April 20, 2009	June 12, 2009
R v Griffin, 2009 SCC 28, [2009] 2 S.C.R. 42	November 14, 2008	June 18, 2009			1		2
Caisse populaire Desjardins de l'Est de Drummond v Canada, 2009 SCC 29, [2009] 2 S.C.R. 94	February 29, 2008	June 19, 2009
AC v Manitoba (Director of Child and Family Services), 2009 SCC 30, [2009] 2 S.C.R. 181	May 20, 2008	June 26, 2009
Greater Vancouver Transportation Authority v Canadian Federation of Students — British Columbia Component, 2009 SCC 31, [2009] 2 S.C.R. 295	March 25, 2008	July 10, 2009
Case name	Argued	Decided	McLachlin	Binnie	LeBel	Deschamps	Fish	Abella	Charron	Rothstein	Cromwell
R v Grant, 2009 SCC 32, [2009] 2 S.C.R. 353	April 24, 2008	July 17, 2009
R v Suberu, 2009 SCC 33, [2009] 2 S.C.R. 460	April 15, 2008	July 17, 2009
R v Harrison, 2009 SCC 34, [2009] 2 S.C.R. 494	December 9, 2008	July 17, 2009
R v Shepherd, 2009 SCC 35, [2009] 2 S.C.R. 527	April 24, 2008	July 17, 2009
R v Layton, 2009 SCC 36, [2009] 2 S.C.R. 540	April 21, 2009	July 23, 2009
Alberta v Hutterian Brethren of Wilson Colony, 2009 SCC 37, [2009] 2 S.C.R. 567	October 7, 2008	July 23, 2009			1		2	3
R v Bjelland, 2009 SCC 38, [2009] 2 S.C.R. 651	November 20, 2008	July 30, 2009
Nolan v Kerry (Canada) Inc, 2009 SCC 39, [2009] 2 S.C.R. 678	November 18, 2008	August 7, 2009
Bell Canada v Bell Aliant Regional Communications, 2009 SCC 40, [2009] 2 S.C.R. 764	March 16, 2009	September 18, 2009
United States of America v Anekwu, 2009 SCC 41, [2009] 3 S.C.R. 3	February 10, 2009	September 24, 2009
Case name	Argued	Decided	McLachlin	Binnie	LeBel	Deschamps	Fish	Abella	Charron	Rothstein	Cromwell
R v Jaw, 2009 SCC 42, [2009] 3 S.C.R. 26	January 13, 2009	September 25, 2009
Marcotte v Longueuil (City), 2009 SCC 43, [2009] 3 S.C.R. 65	January 19, 2009	October 8, 2009
Breslaw v Montreal (City), 2009 SCC 44, [2009] 3 S.C.R. 131	January 19, 2009	October 8, 2009
R v Last, 2009 SCC 45, [2009] 3 S.C.R. 146	March 27, 2009	October 15, 2009
Canada (Justice) v Fischbacher, 2009 SCC 46, [2009] 3 S.C.R. 170	June 16, 2009	October 16, 2009
Nguyen v Quebec (Education, Recreation and Sports), 2009 SCC 47, [2009] 3 S.C.R. 208	December 15, 2008	October 22, 2009
Galambos v Perez, 2009 SCC 48, [2009] 3 S.C.R. 247	April 15, 2009	October 23, 2009
Quebec (Revenue) v Caisse populaire Desjardins de Montmagny, 2009 SCC 49, [2009] 3 S.C.R. 286	March 17, 2009	October 30, 2009
Northrop Grumman Overseas Services Corp v Canada (AG), 2009 SCC 50, [2009] 3 S.C.R. 309	May 19, 2009	November 5, 2009
Miazga v Kvello Estate, 2009 SCC 51, [2009] 3 S.C.R. 339	December 12, 2008	November 6, 2009
Case name	Argued	Decided	McLachlin	Binnie	LeBel	Deschamps	Fish	Abella	Charron	Rothstein	Cromwell
R v Basi, 2009 SCC 52, [2009] 3 S.C.R. 389	April 22, 2009	November 19, 2009
Consolidated Fastfrate Inc v Western Canada Council of Teamsters, 2009 SCC 53, [2009] 3 S.C.R. 407	February 19, 2009	November 26, 2009
Plourde v Wal‑Mart Canada Corp, 2009 SCC 54, [2009] 3 S.C.R. 465	January 21, 2009	November 27, 2009
Desbiens v Wal‑Mart Canada Corp, 2009 SCC 55, [2009] 3 S.C.R. 540	January 21, 2009	November 27, 2009
R v Legare, 2009 SCC 56, [2009] 3 S.C.R. 551	October 15, 2009	December 3, 2009
R v Burke, 2009 SCC 57, [2009] 3 S.C.R. 566	November 19, 2009	December 4, 2009
R v Dudley, 2009 SCC 58, [2009] 3 S.C.R. 570	March 18, 2009	December 17, 2009
Co‑operators Life Insurance Co v Gibbens, 2009 SCC 59, [2009] 3 S.C.R. 605	April 16, 2009	December 18, 2009
R v Bird, 2009 SCC 60, [2009] 3 S.C.R. 638	December 11, 2009	December 18, 2009
Grant v Torstar Corp, 2009 SCC 61, [2009] 3 S.C.R. 640	April 23, 2009	December 22, 2009
Case name	Argued	Decided	McLachlin	Binnie	LeBel	Deschamps	Fish	Abella	Charron	Rothstein	Cromwell
Quan v Cusson, 2009 SCC 62, [2009] 3 S.C.R. 712	April 23, 2009	December 22, 2009
