= Reasons of the Supreme Court of Canada by Beverley McLachlin =

The following is a list of Supreme Court of Canada opinions written by Beverley McLachlin during her tenure on the Court.

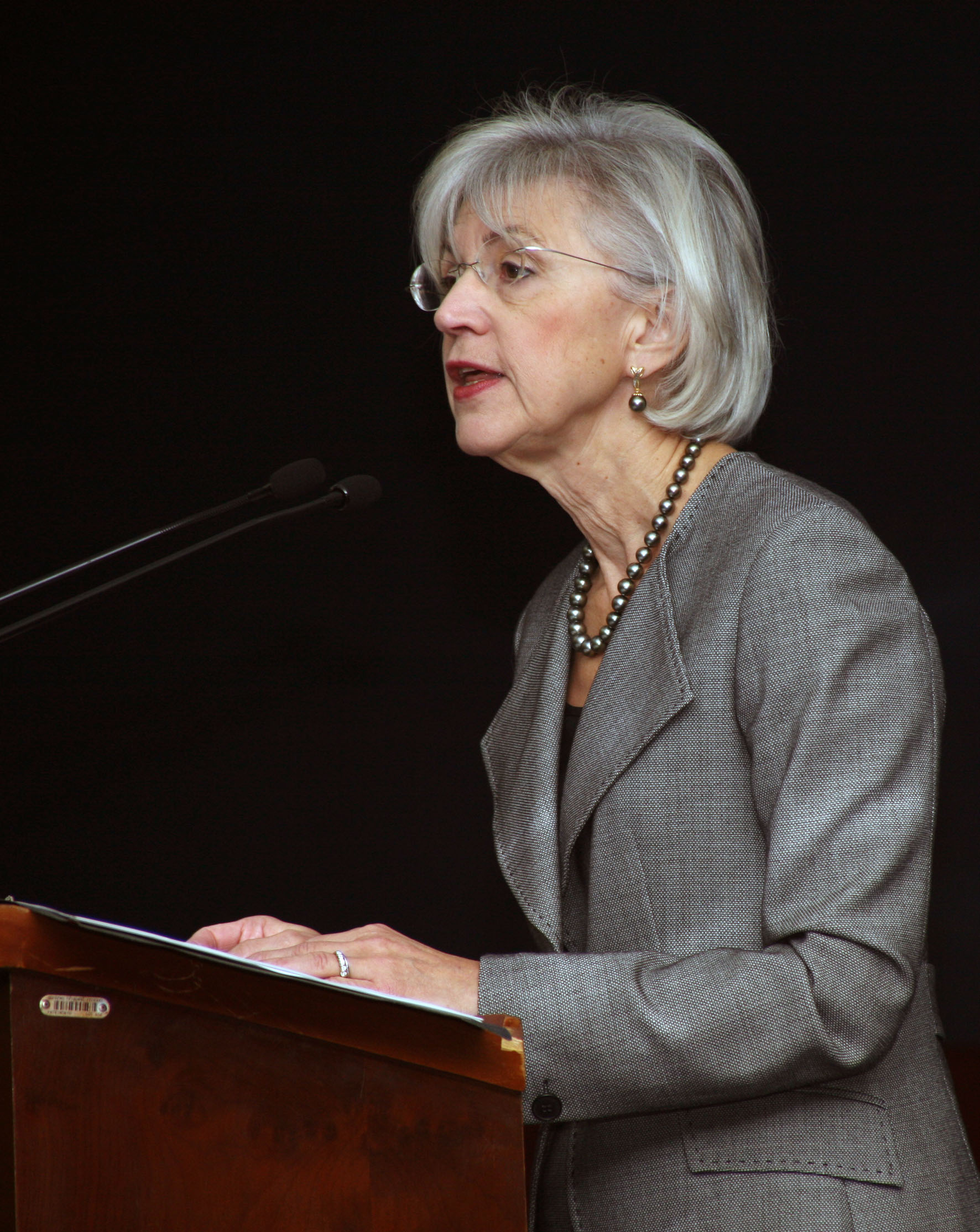
Chief Justice Beverley McLachlin on November 20, 2007

== 1989 ==
- British Columbia v Henfrey Samson Belair Ltd, [1989] 2 S.C.R. 24
- R v Leaney, [1989] 2 S.C.R. 393
- Falk Bros Industries Ltd v Elance Steel Fabricating Co, [1989] 2 S.C.R. 778
- Scarff v Wilson, [1989] 2 S.C.R. 776
- Watkins v Olafson, [1989] 2 S.C.R. 750
- QNS Paper Co v Chartwell Shipping Ltd, [1989] 2 S.C.R. 683
- R v L (JE), [1989] 2 S.C.R. 510
- R v M (SH), [1989] 2 S.C.R. 446
- Mackeigan v Hickman, [1989] 2 S.C.R. 796
- Oregon Jack Creek Indian Band v Canadian National Railway Co, [1989] 2 S.C.R. 1069
- R v Nygaard, [1989] 2 S.C.R. 1074
- R v Buttar, [1989] 2 S.C.R. 1429

== 1990 ==
- R v Shubley, [1990] 1 S.C.R. 3
- Rawluk v Rawluk, [1990] 1 S.C.R. 70 (dissent)
- R v Van Rassel, [1990] 1 S.C.R. 225
- R v A, [1990] 1 S.C.R. 995 (dissent)
- R v Wallen, [1990] 1 S.C.R. 827
- CCR Fishing Ltd v British Reserve Insurance Co, [1990] 1 S.C.R. 814
- Nichols v American Home Assurance Co, [1990] 1 S.C.R. 801
- R v B (CR), [1990] 1 S.C.R. 717
- Ratych v Bloomer, [1990] 1 S.C.R. 940
- R v Saunders, [1990] 1 S.C.R. 1020
- R v B (G), [1990] 2 S.C.R. 57
- Rocket v Royal College of Dental Surgeons of Ontario, [1990] 2 S.C.R. 232
- R v Hebert, [1990] 2 S.C.R. 151
- Bishop v Stevens, [1990] 2 S.C.R. 467
- National Trust Co v Mead, [1990] 2 S.C.R. 410
- R v Khan, [1990] 2 S.C.R. 531
- R v Hess; R v Nguyen, [1990] 2 S.C.R. 906
- R v Penno, [1990] 2 S.C.R. 865
- R v Askov, [1990] 2 S.C.R. 1199
- R v Zito, [1990] 2 S.C.R. 1520
- R v Lachance, [1990] 2 S.C.R. 1490
- R v Garofoli, [1990] 2 S.C.R. 1421 (dissent)
- Dersch v Canada (AG), [1990] 2 S.C.R. 1505
- Lester (WW) (1978) Ltd v United Association of Journeymen and Apprentices of the Plumbing and Pipefitting Industry, Local 740, [1990] 3 S.C.R. 644
- R v Scott, [1990] 3 S.C.R. 979 (dissent)
- Canada (Human Rights Commission) v Taylor, [1990] 3 S.C.R. 892 (dissent in part)
- R v Andrews, [1990] 3 S.C.R. 870 (dissent)
- R v Keegstra, [1990] 3 S.C.R. 697 (dissent)
- R v Chaulk, [1990] 3 S.C.R. 1303 (dissent)

== 1991 ==
- Reference Re Prov Electoral Boundaries (Sask) [1991] 2 S.C.R. 158
- R v Seaboyer [1991] 2 S.C.R. 577

Note: This part of the list is incomplete

== 1992 ==
- Norberg v Wynrib [1992] 2 S.C.R. 224
- R v Zundel [1992] 2 S.C.R. 731

Note: This part of the list is incomplete

== 1993 ==
- Hall v Hebert, [1993] 2 S.C.R. 159
- R v Creighton, [1993] 3 S.C.R. 3
- Rodriguez v British Columbia (AG), [1993] 3 S.C.R. 519

Note: This part of the list is incomplete

== 1994 ==
- Dagenais v Canadian Broadcasting Corp[1994] 3 S.C.R. 835

Note: This part of the list is incomplete

== 1995 ==
Note: This part of the list is incomplete

== 1996 ==
Note: This part of the list is incomplete

== 1997 ==
- R v Leipert, [1997] 1 S.C.R. 281
- R v Stillman, [1997] 1 S.C.R. 607
- R v Curragh Inc, [1997] 1 S.C.R. 537
- R v Noble, [1997] 1 S.C.R. 874
- R v McDonnell, [1997] 1 S.C.R. 948
- Soulos v Korkontzilas, [1997] 2 S.C.R. 217
- Opetchesaht Indian Band v Canada, [1997] 2 S.C.R. 119
- Hickman Motors Ltd v Canada, [1997] 2 S.C.R. 336
- Arndt v Smith, [1997] 2 S.C.R. 539
- R v G (SG), [1997] 2 S.C.R. 716
- R v Esau, [1997] 2 S.C.R. 777
- Pasiechnyk v Saskatchewan (Workers' Compensation Board), [1997] 2 S.C.R. 890
- R v S (RD), [1997] 3 S.C.R. 484
- R v Ly, [1997] 3 S.C.R. 698
- Wallace v United Grain Growers Ltd, [1997] 3 S.C.R. 701
- Winnipeg Child and Family Services (Northwest Area) v G (DF), [1997] 3 S.C.R. 925
- R v Skalbania, [1997] 3 S.C.R. 995
- Lewis (Guardian ad litem of) v British Columbia, [1997] 3 S.C.R. 1145
- Delgamuukw v British Columbia, [1997] 3 S.C.R. 1010
- Porto Seguro Companhia De Seguros Gerais v Belcan SA, [1997] 3 S.C.R. 1278
- Bow Valley Husky (Bermuda) Ltd v Saint John Shipbuilding Ltd, [1997] 3 S.C.R. 1210

== 1998 ==
- Westcoast Energy Inc v Canada (National Energy Board), [1998] 1 S.C.R. 322 (dissent)
- R v Lucas, [1998] 1 S.C.R. 439
- R v Charemski, [1998] 1 S.C.R. 679
- Canada (Human Rights Commission) v Canadian Liberty Net, [1998] 1 S.C.R. 626
- R v Williams, [1998] 1 S.C.R. 1128
- Canada Safeway Ltd v Retail, Wholesale and Department Store Union, Local 454, [1998] 1 S.C.R. 1079
- Battlefords and District Co-operatives Ltd v Retail, Wholesale and Department Store Union, Local 544, [1998] 1 S.C.R. 1118
- Union of New Brunswick Indians v New Brunswick (Minister of Finance), [1998] 1 S.C.R. 1161
- R v Cuerrier, [1998] 2 S.C.R. 371
- Continental Bank of Canada v Canada, [1998] 2 S.C.R. 358
- Continental Bank Leasing Corp v Canada, [1998] 2 S.C.R. 298
- R v MacDougall, [1998] 3 S.C.R. 45
- R v Gallant, [1998] 3 S.C.R. 80

== 1999 ==
Beverley McLachlin 1999 statistics

14	Majority or Plurality	1	Concurrence	0	Other
3	Dissent	0	Concurrence/dissent	Total =	?
Written opinions = ?		Oral opinions = ?		Unanimous opinions = ?

Case name	Issue	Co-authored by	Joined by
Bracklow v Bracklow [1999] 1 S.C.R. 420			
Novak v Bond [1999] 1 S.C.R. 808			
Corbiere v Canada (Minister of Indian and Northern Affairs) [1999] 2 S.C.R. 203			
R v G (B) [1999] 2 S.C.R. 475			
Winko v British Columbia (Forensic Psychiatric Institute) [1999] 2 S.C.R. 625			
R v LePage [1999] 2 S.C.R. 744			
Orlowski v British Columbia (Forensic Psychiatric Institute) [1999] 2 S.C.R. 733			
Jacobi v Griffiths [1999] 2 S.C.R. 570			
Bese v British Columbia (Forensic Psychiatric Institute) [1999] 2 S.C.R. 722			
Bazley v Curry [1999] 2 S.C.R. 534			
Dobson (Litigation Guardian of) v Dobson [1999] 2 S.C.R. 753		None	L'Heureux-Dube J.
British Columbia (Public Service Employee Relations Commission) v British Columbia Government Employees' Union [1999] 3 S.C.R. 3			
R v Marshall [1999] 3 S.C.R. 456			
Shell Canada Ltd v Canada [1999] 3 S.C.R. 622			
Royal Bank of Canada v W Got Associates Electric Ltd [1999] 3 S.C.R. 408			
R v F (WJ) [1999] 3 S.C.R. 569			
R v Mills [1999] 3 S.C.R. 668			
British Columbia (Superintendent of Motor Vehicles) v British Columbia (Council of Human Rights) [1999] 3 S.C.R. 868			

== 2000 ==
Beverley McLachlin 2000 statistics

?	Majority or Plurality	?	Concurrence	?	Other
?	Dissent	?	Concurrence/dissent	Total =	?
Written opinions = ?		Oral opinions = ?		Unanimous opinions = ?

Case name	Issue	Co-authored by	Joined by
Kovach v British Columbia (Workers' Compensation Board) [2000] 1 S.C.R. 55; 2000 SCC 3			
Lindsay v Saskatchewan (Workers' Compensation Board) [2000] 1 S.C.R. 59; 2000 SCC 4			
R v RNS [2000] 1 S.C.R. 149; 2000 SCC 7			
Ajax (Town of) v CAW, Local 222 [2000] 1 S.C.R. 538; 2000 SCC 23			
Non-Marine Underwriters, Lloyd's of London v Scalera [2000] 1 S.C.R. 551; 2000 SCC 24			
Sansalone v Wawanesa Mutual Insurance Co [2000] 1 S.C.R. 627; 2000 SCC 25			
R v ARB [2000] 1 S.C.R. 781; 2000 SCC 30			
Reference Re Gruenke [2000] 1 S.C.R. 836; 2000 SCC 32			
R v Starr [2000] 2 S.C.R. 144; 2000 SCC 40			
R v DD [2000] 2 S.C.R. 275; 2000 SCC 43			
R v MO [2000] 2 S.C.R. 594; 2000 SCC 49			
R v Sutton [2000] 2 S.C.R. 595; 2000 SCC 50			
Musqueam Indian Band v Glass [2000] 2 S.C.R. 633; 2000 SCC 52			
R v Simard [2000] 2 S.C.R. 911; 2000 SCC 61			

== 2001 ==
Beverley McLachlin 2001 statistics

17	Majority or Plurality	0	Concurrence	0	Other
0	Dissent	0	Concurrence/dissent	Total =	17
Written opinions = ?		Oral opinions = ?		Unanimous opinions = ?

Case name	Issue	Co-authored by	Joined by
R v Sharpe [2001] 1 S.C.R. 45; 2001 SCC 2			
R v Deane [2001] 1 S.C.R. 279; 2001 SCC 5			
R v Parent [2001] 1 S.C.R. 761; 2001 SCC 30			
R v Find [2001] 1 S.C.R. 863; 2001 SCC 32			
Mitchell v MNR [2001] 1 S.C.R. 911; 2001 SCC 33			
Western Canadian Shopping Centres Inc v Dutton [2001] 2 S.C.R. 534; 2001 SCC 46			
Ocean Port Hotel Ltd v British Columbia (General Manager, Liquor Control and Licensing Branch) [2001] 2 S.C.R. 781; 2001 SCC 52			
R v Russell [2001] 2 S.C.R. 804; 2001 SCC 53			
R v Arcuri [2001] 2 S.C.R. 828; 2001 SCC 54			
R v Mankwe [2001] 3 S.C.R. 3; 2001 SCC 63			
Hollick v Toronto (City of) [2001] 3 S.C.R. 158; 2001 SCC 68			
Rumley v British Columbia [2001] 3 S.C.R. 184; 2001 SCC 69			
R v Scott [2001] 3 S.C.R. 425; 2001 SCC 73			
Cooper v Hobart [2001] 3 S.C.R. 537; 2001 SCC 79			
Edwards v Law Society of Upper Canada [2001] 3 S.C.R. 562; 2001 SCC 80			
R v 974649 Ontario Inc [2001] 3 S.C.R. 575; 2001 SCC 81			
R v Hynes [2001] 3 S.C.R. 623; 2001 SCC 82			

== 2002 ==
Beverley McLachlin 2002 statistics

?	Majority or Plurality	?	Concurrence	?	Other
?	Dissent	?	Concurrence/dissent	Total =	?
Written opinions = ?		Oral opinions = ?		Unanimous opinions = ?

Case name	Issue	Co-authored by	Joined by
Retail, Wholesale and Department Store Union, Local 558 v Pepsi-Cola Canada Beverages (West) Ltd [2002] 1 S.C.R. 156; 2002 SCC 8			
Krangle (Guardian ad litem of) v Brisco [2002] 1 S.C.R. 205; 2002 SCC 9			
Ward v Canada (AG) [2002] 1 S.C.R. 569; 2002 SCC 17			
Lavoie v Canada [2002] 1 S.C.R. 769; 2002 SCC 23			
R v Cinous [2002] 2 S.C.R. 3; 2002 SCC 29			
R v Perciballi [2002] 2 S.C.R. 761; 2002 SCC 51			
Babcock v Canada (AG) [2002] 3 S.C.R. 3; 2002 SCC 57			
Canam Enterprises Inc v Coles [2002] 3 S.C.R. 307; 2002 SCC 63			
R v Hall [2002] 3 S.C.R. 309; 2002 SCC 64			
B v Ontario (Human Rights Commission) [2002] 3 S.C.R. 403; 2002 SCC 66			
Sauvé v Canada (Chief Electoral Officer) [2002] 3 S.C.R. 519; 2002 SCC 68			
Quebec (AG) v Laroche [2002] 3 S.C.R. 708; 2002 SCC 72			
Gosselin v Quebec (AG) [2002] 4 S.C.R. 429; 2002 SCC 84			
Chamberlain v Surrey School District No 36 [2002] 4 S.C.R. 710; 2002 SCC 86			

== 2003 ==
Beverley McLachlin 2003 statistics

?	Majority or Plurality	?	Concurrence	?	Other
?	Dissent	?	Concurrence/dissent	Total =	?
Written opinions = ?		Oral opinions = ?		Unanimous opinions = ?

Case name	Issue	Co-authored by	Joined by
R v Wise [2003] 1 S.C.R. 3; 2003 SCC 1			
R v Pelletier [2003] 1 S.C.R. 4; 2003 SCC 2			
R v Harriott [2003] 1 S.C.R. 39; 2003 SCC 5			
Reference Re Earth Future Lottery [2003] 1 S.C.R. 123; 2003 SCC 10			
Martin v American International Assurance Life Co [2003] 1 S.C.R. 158; 2003 SCC 16			
Dr Q v College of Physicians and Surgeons of British Columbia [2003] 1 S.C.R. 226; 2003 SCC 19			
KP Pacific Holdings Ltd v Guardian Insurance Co of Canada [2003] 1 S.C.R. 433; 2003 SCC 25			
Churchland v Gore Mutual Insurance Co [2003] 1 S.C.R. 445; 2003 SCC 26			
Starson v Swayze [2003] 1 S.C.R. 722; 2003 SCC 32			
Bell Canada v Canadian Telephone Employees Association [2003] 1 S.C.R. 884; 2003 SCC 36			
Wewaykum Indian Band v Canada [2003] 2 S.C.R. 259; 2003 SCC 45			
KLB v British Columbia [2003] 2 S.C.R. 403; 2003 SCC 51			
EDG v Hammer [2003] 2 S.C.R. 459; 2003 SCC 52			
MB v British Columbia [2003] 2 S.C.R. 477; 2003 SCC 53			
R v Phillips [2003] 2 S.C.R. 623; 2003 SCC 57			

== 2004 ==
Beverley McLachlin 2004 statistics

?	Majority or Plurality	?	Concurrence	?	Other
?	Dissent	?	Concurrence/dissent	Total =	?
Written opinions = ?		Oral opinions = ?		Unanimous opinions = ?

Case name	Issue	Co-authored by	Joined by
Canadian Foundation for Children, Youth and the Law v Canada (AG) [2004] 1 S.C.R. 76, 2004 SCC 4			
CCH Canadian Ltd v Law Society of Upper Canada [2004] 1 S.C.R. 39, 2004 SCC 13			
R v Cheddesingh [2004] 1 S.C.R. 433; 2004 SCC 16			
John Doe v Bennett [2004] 1 S.C.R. 436; 2004 SCC 17			
Nutribec Ltée v Quebec (Commission d'appel en matière de lésions professionnelles) [2004] 1 S.C.R. 824; 2004			
Harper v Canada (AG) [2004] 1 S.C.R. 827; 2004 SCC 33			
Monsanto Canada Inc v Schmeiser [2004] 1 S.C.R. 902, 2004 SCC 34			
Quebec (Commission des droits de la pesonne et des droits de la jeunesse) v Quebec (AG) [2004] 2 S.C.R. 185; 2004 SCC 39			
Quebec (AG) v Quebec (Human Rights Tribunal) [2004] 2 S.C.R. 223; 2004 SCC 40			
R v Rémillard [2004] 2 S.C.R. 246; 2004 SCC 41			
Congrégation des témoins de Jéhovah de St-Jérôme-Lafontaine v Lafontaine (Village of) [2004] 2 S.C.R. 650; 2004 SCC 48			
R v Raponi [2004] 3 S.C.R. 35; 2004 SCC 50			
R v Saunders [2004] 3 S.C.R. 505; 2004 SCC 70			
R v Smith [2004] 3 S.C.R. 507; 2004 SCC 71			
R v Zurowski [2004] 3 S.C.R. 509; 2004 SCC 72			
Haida Nation v British Columbia (Minister of Forests) [2004] 3 S.C.R. 511; 2004 SCC 73			
Taku River Tlingit First Nation v British Columbia (Project Assessment Director) [2004] 3 S.C.R. 550; 2004 SCC 74			
Auton (Guardian ad litem of) v British Columbia (AG) [2004] 3 S.C.R. 657; 2004 SCC 78			

== 2005 ==
Beverley McLachlin 2005 statistics

?	Majority or Plurality	?	Concurrence	?	Other
?	Dissent	?	Concurrence/dissent	Total =	??
Written opinions = ?		Oral opinions = ?		Unanimous opinions = ?

Case name	Issue	Co-authored by	Joined by
British Columbia Hydro and Power Authority v British Columbia (Environmental Appeal Board) [2005] 1 S.C.R. 3; 2005 SCC 1			
R v Mapara [2005] 1 S.C.R. 358; 2005 SCC 23			
Chaoulli v Quebec (AG) [2005] 1 S.C.R. 791; 2005 SCC 35			
Mugesera v Canada (Minister of Citizenship and Immigration) [2005] 2 S.C.R. 100; 2005 SCC 40			
R v Marshall; R v Bernard [2005] 2 S.C.R. 220			
Medovarski v Canada (Minister of Citizenship and Immigration); Esteban v Canada (Minister of Citizenship and Immigration) [2005] 2 S.C.R. 539; 2005 SCC 51			
Canada Trustco Mortgage Co v Canada [2005] 2 S.C.R. 601; 2005 SCC 54			
Mathew v Canada [2005] 2 S.C.R. 643; 2005 SCC 55			
Blackwater v Plint [2005] 3 S.C.R. 3; 2005 SCC 58			
Montréal (City of) v 2952-1366 Québec Inc [2005] 3 S.C.R. 141; 2005 SCC 62			
R v Escobar-Benavidez [2005] 3 S.C.R. 386; 2005 SCC 68			
R v MacKay [2005] 3 S.C.R. 607; 2005 SCC 75			
R v Labaye [2005] 3 S.C.R. 728; 2005 SCC 80			
R v Kouri [2005] 3 S.C.R. 789; 2005 SCC 81			
Marche v Halifax Insurance Co [2005] 1 S.C.R. 47; 2005 SCC			

== 2006 ==
Beverley McLachlin 2006 statistics

8	Majority or Plurality	0	Concurrence	0	Other
2	Dissent	0	Concurrence/dissent	Total =	10
Written reasons = ?		Oral reasons = ?		Unanimous reasons = ?

Case name	Issue	Co-authored by	Joined by
Young v Bella [2006] 1 S.C.R. 108; 2006 SCC 3	Duty of care for reporting child abuse	Binnie J.	Unanimous
Canadian Pacific Railway Co v Vancouver (City of); 1 S.C.R. _; 2006 SCC 5	Validity of municipal by-laws	None	Unanimous
Childs v Desormeaux; 2006 SCC 18	Social host liability	None	Unanimous
Fidler v Sun Life Assurance Co of Canada; 2006 SCC 30	Breach of contract; mental distress	Abella J.	Unanimous
R v Boulanger; 2006 SCC 32	Breach of trust by public officers	None	Unanimous
United States of America v Ferras; United States of America v Latty; 2006 SCC 33	Extradition	None	Unanimous
United Mexican States v Ortega; United States of America v Fiessel; 2006 SCC 34	Extradition	None	Unanimous
Pro Swing Inc v Elta Golf Inc; 2006 SCC 52	Conflict of laws; Enforce non-monetary judgments	None	Bastarache and Charron JJ.
McDiarmid Lumber Ltd v God's Lake First Nation, 2006 SCC 58; 2006 SCC 58	Aboriginal rights; seizure	None	Bastarache, LeBel, Deschamps, Charron and Rothstein JJ.
R v Morris; 2006 SCC 59	Aboriginal treaty rights	Fish J.	Bastarache J.

== 2007 ==
- Little Sisters Book and Art Emporium v Canada (Commissioner of Customs and Revenue), [2007] 1 S.C.R. 38, 2007 SCC 2 (concurrence)
- Resurfice Corp v Hanke, [2007] 1 S.C.R. 333, 2007 SCC 7
- Charkaoui v Canada (Citizenship and Immigration), [2007] 1 S.C.R. 350, 2007 SCC 9
- R v McKay, [2007] 1 S.C.R. 793, 2007 SCC 16
- Strother v 3464920 Canada Inc, [2007] 2 S.C.R. 177, 2007 SCC 24 (dissent)
- Health Services and Support – Facilities Subsector Bargaining Assn. v British Columbia, 2007 SCC 27
- Canada (AG) v JTI-Macdonald Corp, [2007] 2 S.C.R. 610, 2007 SCC 30
- Rogers Wireless Inc v Muroff, [2007] 2 S.C.R. 921, 2007 SCC 35 (majority)
- Hill v Hamilton‑Wentworth Regional Police Services Board, [2007] 3 S.C.R. 129, 2007 SCC 41 (majority)
- Jedfro Investments (USA) Ltd v Jacyk, [2007] 3 S.C.R. 679, 2007 SCC 55 (majority)

== 2008 ==
- R v Beatty, [2008] 1 S.C.R. 49, 2008 SCC 5 (concurrence)
- R v Ferguson, [2008] 1 S.C.R. 96, 2008 SCC 6 (majority)
- R v Turningrobe, [2008] 1 S.C.R. 454, 2008 SCC 17 (majority)
- Mustapha v Culligan of Canada Ltd, [2008] 2 S.C.R. 114, 2008 SCC 27 (majority)
- R v Kapp, [2008] 2 S.C.R. 483, 2008 SCC 41 (majority)
- Holland v Saskatchewan, [2008] 2 S.C.R. 551, 2008 SCC 42 (majority)
- New Brunswick (Human Rights Commission) v Potash Corporation of Saskatchewan Inc, [2008] 2 S.C.R. 604, 2008 SCC 45 (concurrence)
- Redeemer Foundation v Canada (National Revenue), [2008] 2 S.C.R. 643, 2008 SCC 46 (majority)
- R v REM, [2008] 3 S.C.R. 3, 2008 SCC 51 (majority)
- R v HSB, [2008] 3 S.C.R. 32, 2008 SCC 52 (majority)
- RBC Dominion Securities Inc v Merrill Lynch Canada Inc, [2008] 3 S.C.R. 79, 2008 SCC 54 (majority)
- R v Dowe, [2008] 3 S.C.R. 109, 2008 SCC 55 (majority)
- R v Mahalingan, [2008] 3 S.C.R. 316, 2008 SCC 63 (majority)
- R v Caissey, [2008] 3 S.C.R. 451, 2008 SCC 65 (majority)

== 2009 ==
- Ravndahl v Saskatchewan, 2009 SCC 7 (majority)
- Teck Cominco Metals Ltd v Lloyd's Underwriters, 2009 SCC 11 (majority)
- R v Craig, 2009 SCC 23, [2009] (concurrence)
- R v Ouellette, 2009 SCC 24 (dissent)
- AC v Manitoba (Director of Child and Family Services), 2009 SCC 30 (concurrence)
- R v Grant, 2009 SCC 32 (majority)
- R v Suberu, 2009 SCC 33 (majority)
- R v Harrison, 2009 SCC 34 (majority)
- R v Shepherd, 2009 SCC 35 (majority)
- Alberta v Hutterian Brethren of Wilson Colony, 2009 SCC 37 (majority)
- Grant v Torstar Corp, 2009 SCC 61 (majority)
- Quan v Cusson, 2009 SCC 62 (majority)

== 2010 ==
Statistics

XXXXX	Majority or Plurality	XXX	Concurrence	XXXX	Other
XXXX	Dissent	XXXX	Concurrence/dissent	Total =	XXXXXX
Written opinions = XXX		Oral opinions = XXX		Unanimous decisions = XXX

Case name	Issue	Co-authored by	Joined by
R v JZS; 2010 SCC 1	XXX	–	Unanimous
XXX; CITATIONS [URL]	XXX	XXX	XXX

== 2011 ==
Statistics

XXXXX	Majority or Plurality	XXX	Concurrence	XXXX	Other
XXXX	Dissent	XXXX	Concurrence/dissent	Total =	XXXXXX
Written opinions = XXX		Oral opinions = XXX		Unanimous decisions = XXX

Case name	Issue	Co-authored by	Joined by
Withler v Canada (AG); 2011 SCC 12	Whether federal pension legislation, by reducing the supplementary death benefit by 10% for each year by which a plan member exceeds prescribed ages, discriminates against surviving spouses in violation of s. 15(1) of the Charter	–	Unanimous
Ontario (AG) v Fraser; 2011 SCC 20	Whether separate labour relations legislation governing agricultural workers in Ontario infringes freedom of association under s. 2(d) of the Charter by failing to establish a meaningful process of collective bargaining	LeBel J	Binnie, Fish and Cromwell JJ
Alberta v Elder Advocates of Alberta Society; 2011 SCC 24	Whether disputed claims in plaintiff's statement of claim adequately disclose cause of action — Whether principles of fiduciary duty applicable to private actors also apply to governments	–	Unanimous
R v JA; 2011 SCC 28	Whether in offence of sexual assault, Criminal Code defines "consent" as requiring conscious, operating mind throughout sexual activity, or whether consent to sexual activity may be given prior to period of unconsciousness	–	Deschamps, Abella, Charron, Rothstein and Cromwell JJ
R v EMW; 2011 SCC 31	Jurisdiction of a court of appeal to consider whether there was a miscarriage of justice — Whether there was a miscarriage of justice	–	Binnie, Deschamps, Abella, Charron and Cromwell JJ
Canada Trustco Mortgage Co v Canada; 2011 SCC 36	Whether a bank is liable to make payments to a tax debtor when receiving cheques payable to a tax debtor for deposit in an account held jointly by the tax debtor and a third party	–	Fish and Abella JJ
Alberta (Aboriginal Affairs and Northern Development) v Cunningham; 2011 SCC 37	Whether the Alberta Metis Settlements Act, in providing that voluntary registration under the Indian Act precludes membership in a Métis settlement, violates the right to freedom of association and/or the right to liberty under ss. 2(d) and 7 of the Charter, respectively — Whether same is an ameliorative program under s. 15(2) of the Charter	–	Unanimous
R v Imperial Tobacco Canada Ltd; 2011 SCC 42	Tobacco manufacturers being sued by British Columbia government and consumers and issuing third-party notices to federal government claiming contribution and indemnity — Motion to strike and whether it is plain and obvious that third-party claims disclose no reasonable cause of action — Whether federal government is liable as a "manufacturer" under the Tobacco Damages and Health Care Costs Recovery Act or a "supplier" under the Business Practices and Consumer Protection Act — Tort of negligent misrepresentation	–	Unanimous
Canada (AG) v PHS Community Services Society; 2011 SCC 44	Whether Minister of Health's decision to revoke an exemption to the Controlled Drugs and Substances Act prohibiting possession and trafficking of illegal drugs in context of a safe injection site violated claimants' rights to life, liberty and security of the person under s. 7 of the Charter — Whether division of powers exempts the safe injection site as a health facility form the application of the Act as an exercise of federal jurisdiction over criminal law	–	Unanimous
Crookes v Newton; 2011 SCC 47	Tort of libel and slander — Whether a hyperlink to an allegedly defamatory article in itself constitutes a publication	Fish J	–
R v Katigbak; 2011 SCC 48	Possession of child pornography and statutory defences	Charron J	Binnie, Deschamps, Abella, Rothstein and Cromwell JJ
R v Dorfer; 2011 SCC 50	Whether trial judge erred in his instruction to the jury about the limited use of third party suspect's criminal record and if so, whether this error constituted a miscarriage of justice	–	Rothstein and Cromwell JJ
R v Banwait; 2011 SCC 55	Whether the trial judge properly instructed the jury on the relationship between planning and deliberation and murder	–	Unanimous (oral)
Public Service Alliance of Canada v Canada Post Corp; 2011 SCC 57	Whether the Canadian Human Rights Tribunal committed a reviewable error in finding that a largely female group of employees were being paid less for work of equal value	–	Unanimous (oral)

== 2012 ==
Statistics

11	Majority or Plurality	0	Concurrence	0	Other
3	Dissent	0	Concurrence/dissent	Total =	14
Written opinions = 11		Oral opinions = 3		Unanimous decisions = 8

Case name	Issue	Co-authored by	Joined by
Catalyst Paper Corp v North Cowichan (District of); 2012 SCC 2	Standard of review applicable to municipal taxation bylaw	–	Unanimous
R v DAI; 2012 SCC 5	Whether adult witnesses with mental disabilities must demonstrate understanding of nature of obligation to tell truth in order to be deemed competent to testify	–	Deschamps, Abella, Charron, Rothstein and Cromwell JJ
R v Eastgaard; 2012 SCC 11	Offence of possession of prohibited or restricted firearm with ammunition and the reasonableness of trial judge's inference from circumstantial evidence mens rea was satisfied	–	Unanimous (oral)
R v Kociuk; 2012 SCC 15	Appropriateness of trial judge's charge to jury	–	Unanimous (oral)
Clements v Clements; 2012 SCC 32	Tort of negligence and appropriate test for factual causation	–	Deschamps, Fish, Abella, Cromwell, Moldaver and Karakatsanis JJ
R v Mabior; 2012 SCC 47	Offence of aggravated assault and whether non-disclosure of HIV status in circumstances where no realistic possibility of transmission exists can constitute fraud vitiating consent to sexual relations	–	Unanimous
R v DC; 2012 SCC 48	Offence of sexual assault and aggravated assault and non-disclosure of HIV statute; Whether trial judge could rely on doctor's note as confirmatory evidence of complainant's testimony that no condom had been used	–	Unanimous
Southcott Estates Inc v Toronto Catholic District School Board; 2012 SCC 51	Contracts – Whether plaintiff seeking specific performance has obligation to mitigate losses	–	–
Opitz v Wrzesnewskyj; 2012 SCC 55	Application to have federal election result annulled on the basis of "irregularities... that affected the result of the election" under s. 531(2) of the Canada Elections Act	–	LeBel and Fish JJ
R v PDT; 2012 SCC 62	Whether the trial verdict was unreasonable	–	Unanimous (oral)
Newfoundland and Labrador v AbitibiBowater Inc; 2012 SCC 67	Bankruptcy and insolvency and whether the federal Companies' Creditors Arrangement Act is ultra vires by permitting courts to determine whether an environmental order is a monetary claim	–	–
Sriskandarajah v United States of America; 2012 SCC 70	Whether extradition violates the right to remain in Canada even when foreign state's claim of jurisdiction is weak or when prosecution in Canada is feasible	–	Unanimous
R v Khawaja; 2012 SCC 69	Whether provisions under the terrorism offences under Part II.1 of the Criminal Code violate the right to free expression under s. 2(b) of the Charter; Whether offence of terrorism provision is broader than necessary to achieve its purpose or whether its impact is disproportionate, contrary to the principles of fundamental justice under s. 7 of the Charter; Sentencing and the totality principle	–	Unanimous
R v NS; 2012 SCC 72	Whether requiring witness to remove niqab while testifying would interfere with her religious freedom under s. 2(a) of the Charter; Whether permitting witness to wear niqab while testifying would create a serious risk to trial fairness under s. 11(d) of the Charter	–	Deschamps, Fish and Cromwell JJ

== 2013 ==
Statistics

11	Majority or Plurality	1	Concurrence	0	Other
1	Dissent	0	Concurrence/dissent	Total =	13
Written opinions = 10		Oral opinions = 3		Unanimous decisions = 7

Case name	Issue	Co-authored by	Joined by
Quebec (AG) v A 2013 SCC 5	Discrimination based on marital status under s. 15(1) of the Charter	–	–
R v Blacklaws; 2013 SCC 8	Criminal law procedure and applications to sever counts	–	Unanimous (oral)
Manitoba Metis Federation Inc v Canada (AG); 2013 SCC 14	Aboriginal law and the honour of the Crown	Karakatsanis J	LeBel, Fish, Abella and Cromwell JJ
R v MacIntosh; 2013 SCC 23	Right to be tried within a reasonable time under s. 11(b) of the Charter	–	Unanimous (oral)
R v GM; 2013 SCC 24	Fresh evidence of ineffective assistance from counsel at trial	–	Unanimous (oral)
Cojocaru v British Columbia Women's Hospital and Health Centre; 2013 SCC 30	Tort of negligence, consent to healthcare and failure to inform	–	Unanimous
Canadian National Railway Co v McKercher LLP; 2013 SCC 39	Legal ethics – the duty of loyalty and avoiding conflicts of interest	–	Unanimous
Régie des rentes du Québec v Canada Bread Company Ltd; 2013 SCC 46	Judicial review of Régie des rentes du Québec's decision under the Supplemental Pensions Plan Act partially terminating the pension plans of two divisions closed by the employer	–	Fish J
Cuthbertson v Rasouli; 2013 SCC 53	Health law – Consent to withdrawal of treatment; whether withdrawal constitutes "treatment" under Ontario Health Care Consent Act	–	LeBel, Fish, Rothstein and Cromwell JJ
R v Pappas; 2013 SCC 56	Defence of provocation	–	Abella, Rothstein, Cromwell, Moldaver and Wagner JJ
R v Cairney; 2013 SCC 55	Defence of provocation	–	Rothstein, Cromwell, Moldaver and Wagner JJ
Canada (AG) v Bedford; 2013 SCC 72	Constitutionality of prohibitions on bawdy-houses, living on avails of prostitution and communicating in public for purposes of prostitution under the Criminal Code under s. 7 of the Charter	–	Unanimous
Cinar Corp v Robinson; 2013 SCC 73	Intellectual property and copyright infringement	–	Unanimous

== 2014 ==
2014 statistics

14	Majority or Plurality	2	Concurrence	0	Other
0	Dissent	0	Concurrence/dissent	Total =	16
Written opinions = 9		Oral opinions = 7		Unanimous decisions = 9

Case name	Issue	Co-authored by	Joined by
R v Auclair; 2014 SCC 6	Trial management	–	Unanimous (oral)
R v Koczab; 2014 SCC 9	Right to counsel and the right to be informed of the offence charged	–	Unanimous (oral)
R v Yelle; 2014 SCC 10	Reasonableness of trial verdict	–	Unanimous (oral)
R v Waite; 2014 SCC 17	Appropriateness of charge to jury	–	Unanimous (oral)
R v Hogg; 2014 SCC 18	Evidence and burden of proof in a criminal trial	–	Unanimous (oral)
R v Hutchinson; 2014 SCC 19	Offence of sexual assault and consent	Cromwell J	Rothstein and Wagner JJ
Reference Re Supreme Court Act, ss 5 and 6; 2014 SCC 21	Eligibility requirements to the Supreme Court of Canada	LeBel, Abella, Cromwell, Karakatsanis and Wagner JJ	–
Canada (Citizenship and Immigration) v Harkat; 2014 SCC 37	Constitutionality of the security certificate scheme of the Immigration and Refugee Protection Act under s. 7 of the Charter	–	LeBel, Rothstein, Moldaver, Karakatsanis and Wagner JJ
Tsilhqot'in Nation v British Columbia; 2014 SCC 44	Aboriginal title and land claims	–	Unanimous
Grassy Narrows First Nation v Ontario (Natural Resources); 2014 SCC 48	Aboriginal treaty rights	–	Unanimous
Trial Lawyers Association of British Columbia v British Columbia (AG); 2014 SCC 59	Access to justice and the constitutionality of hearing fees under ss. 92(14) and 96 of the Constitution Act, 1867	–	LeBel, Abella, Moldaver and Karakatsanis JJ
Imperial Oil v Jacques; 2014 SCC 66	Whether a party to a civil proceeding can request disclosure of recordings of private communications intercepted by the state in the course of a criminal investigation	–	–
Febles v Canada (Citizenship and Immigration); 2014 SCC 68	Convention refugees and exclusion based on commission of serious crime prior to admission to country of refuge	–	LeBel, Rothstein, Moldaver and Wagner JJ
R v Dunn; 2014 SCC 69	Definition of "firearm" and "weapon" under the Criminal Code	–	Unanimous (oral)
Wakeling v United States of America; 2014 SCC 72	Unreasonable search and seizure under s. 8 of the Charter and the disclosure of intercepted private communications without consent	–	–
R v Day; 2014 SCC 74	Arbitrary detention and unreasonable search and seizure under the Charter	–	Unanimous (oral)

== 2015 ==
Statistics

11	Majority or Plurality	1	Concurrence	0	Other
0	Dissent	3	Concurrence/dissent	Total =	15
Written opinions = 9		Oral opinions = 6		Unanimous decisions = 7

Case name	Issue	Co-authored by	Joined by
Mounted Police Association of Ontario v Canada (AG); 2015 SCC 1	Right to collective bargaining under s. 2(d) of the Charter; Whether impugned legislation excluding RCMP members from public services labour relations regime substantially interferes with the right to a meaningful process of collective bargaining	LeBel J	Abella, Cromwell, Karakatsanis and Wagner JJ
Meredith v Canada (AG); 2015 SCC 2	Whether the statutory limit on wages increases in the public sector under the Expenditure Restraint Act infringes claimants' rights to a meaningful process of collective bargaining under s. 2(d) of the Charter	LeBel J	Cromwell, Karakatsanis and Wagner JJ
Canada (AG) v Federation of Law Societies of Canada; 2015 SCC 7	Whether Proceeds of Crime (Money Laundering) and Terrorist Financing Act, as it applies to the legal profession, infringes the right to be free from unreasonable search and seizure and the right not to be deprived of liberty otherwise in accordance with principles of fundamental justice under ss. 8 and 7 of the Charter, respectively	Moldaver J	–
R v Perrone; 2015 SCC 8	Whether the trial judge appropriately considered the credibility and reliability of a witness' testimony	–	Unanimous (oral)
Loyola High School v Quebec (AG); 2015 SCC 12	Proper approach to judicial review of discretionary administrative decisions engaging Charter protections; Whether decision of Minister of Education, Recreation and Sports requiring a proposed alternative program being entirely secular in approach is reasonable given the statutory objectives of the program and s. 2(a) of the Charter, and whether the decision limits freedom of religion under s. 3 of the Quebec Charter of Human Rights and Freedoms	Moldaver J	Rothstein J
R v Sanghera; 2015 SCC 13	Right to be tried within a reasonable time under s. 11(b) of the Charter in light of a five-month delay caused by direct indictment	–	Abella, Rothstein, Moldaver and Gascon JJ (oral)
R v Nur; 2015 SCC 15	Constitutionality of mandatory minimum sentences on grounds of cruel and unusual punishment under s. 12 of the Charter	–	LeBel, Abella, Cromwell, Karakatsanis and Gascon JJ
Sanofi-Aventis v Apotex Inc; 2015 SCC 20	Intellectual property and patents	–	Unanimous (oral)
Henry v British Columbia (AG); 2015 SCC 24	Wrongful conviction of claimant; Civil action alleging breach of Charter rights resulting from Crown counsel's wrongful non-disclose of relevant information; Whether s. 24(1) authorizes courts to award damages against Crown for wrongful non-disclosure, and the level of fault claimant must establish to meet liability threshold for awarding s. 24(1) damages	Karakatsanis J	–
Bowden Institution v Khadr; 2015 SCC 26	Application for habeas corpus for placement in provincial correctional facility under International Transfer of Offenders Act	–	Unanimous (oral)
Goodwin v British Columbia (Superintendent of Motor Vehicles); 2015 SCC 46	Whether an automatic roadside prohibition scheme enacted under s. 92(13) of the Constitution Act, 1867 is ultra vires provincial authority as being exclusively within federal government's criminal law power under s. 91(27) of the Constitution Act, 1867; Whether same automatic roadside prohibition regime creates an offence within the meaning of s. 11 of the Charter and infringes the presumption of innocence under s. 11(d) of same; Whether same automatic roadside prohibition scheme infringes the right to be secure against unreasonable search and seizure under s. 8 of the Charter	–	–
R v Neville; 2015 SCC 49	Whether trial judge's failure to clarify intent question raised by jury resulted in an error of law	–	Unanimous (oral)
R v Singh Riar; 2015 SCC 50	Whether trial judge errors in mischaracterizing the accused's defence and in assessing the accused's evidence and credibility deprived the accused of a fair trial and caused a miscarriage of justice	–	Unanimous (oral)
R v Appulonappa; 2015 SCC 59	Whether the offence of organizing, inducing aiding or abetting persons coming into Canada without valid documentation is overbroad under s. 7 of the Charter	–	Unanimous
B010 v Canada (Citizenship and Immigration); 2015 SCC 58	Requisite grounds to render a person inadmissible to apply for refugee status for having engaged in people smuggling; What limits may be inferred from provision under the Immigration and Refugee Protection Act rendering persons inadmissible on grounds of organized criminality	–	Unanimous

== 2016 ==
2016 statistics

8	Majority or Plurality	3	Concurrence	0	Other
0	Dissent	1	Concurrence/dissent	Total =	12
Written opinions = 7		Oral opinions = 5		Unanimous decisions = 6

Case name	Issue	Co-authored by	Joined by
Carter v Canada (AG); 2016 SCC 4	Motion seeking an order extending the suspension of the declaration of constitutional invalidity issued in Carter v Canada (AG), 2015 SCC 5	Cromwell, Moldaver and Brown JJ	–
R v Meer; 2016 SCC 5	Accused challenging competence of trial lawyer	–	Unanimous (oral)
R v Knapczyk; 2016 SCC 10	Aiding and abetting offence of trafficking through distribution	–	Unanimous (oral)
R v Safarzadeh-Markhali; 2016 SCC 14	Whether denial of enhanced credit for pre-sentence custody to offenders who are denied bail primarily because of prior conviction is overboard in violation of s. 7 of the Charter	–	Unanimous
R v Lloyd; 2016 SCC 13	Cruel and unusual treatment or punishment in violation of s. 12 of the Charter	–	Abella, Cromwell, Moldaver, Karakatsanis and Côté JJ
R v Shaoulle; 2016 SCC 16	Whether verdict of trial judge was reasonable	–	Unanimous (oral)
R v Williamson; 2016 SCC 28	Right to be tried within a reasonable time under s. 11 of the Charter	–	–
Wilson v Atomic Energy of Canada Ltd; 2016 SCC 29	Unjust dismissal of non-unionized employees under the Canada Labour Code	Karakatsanis, Wagner and Gascon JJ	–
R v Cawthorne; 2016 SCC 32	Whether provisions of the National Defence Act infringe ss. 7 and 11(d) of the Charter	–	Unanimous
Urban Communications Inc v BCNET Networking Society; 2016 SCC 45	Judicial review of commercial arbitration decisions	–	Unanimous (oral)
British Columbia Teachers' Federation v British Columbia; 2016 SCC 49	Freedom of association under s. 2(d) of the Charter and the right to collective bargaining	–	Abella, Moldaver, Karakatsanis, Wagner, Gascon and Rowe JJ (oral)
Mennillo v Intramodal inc 2016 SCC 51	Reasonable expectations of shareholders	–	Moldaver J

== 2017 ==
2017 statistics

10	Majority or Plurality	0	Concurrence	0	Other
3	Dissent	1	Concurrence/dissent	Total =	14
Written opinions = 10		Oral opinions = 4		Unanimous decisions = 5

Case name	Issue	Co-authored by	Joined by
Ernst v Alberta Energy Regulator; 2017 SCC 1	Freedom of expression and Charter damages	Moldaver and Brown JJ	Côté J
R v Clark; 2017 SCC 3	Constitutional law – Search and seizure	–	Unanimous (oral)
R v Bédard; 2017 SCC 4	Criminal law – Defence of officially induced error	–	Unanimous (oral)
R v Natewayes; 2017 SCC 5	Offence of breaking and entering and manslaughter	–	Unanimous (oral)
British Columbia Freedom of Information and Privacy Association v British Columbia (AG); 2017 SCC 6	Constitutional law – Freedom of expression	–	Unanimous
R v Bingley; 2017 SCC 12	Expert opinion evidence	–	Abella, Moldaver, Côté and Brown JJ
R v SB; 2017 SCC 16	Powers of appellate courts	–	Unanimous (oral)
Stewart v Elk Valley Coal Corp; 2017 SCC 30	Discrimination based on mental and physical disability	–	Abella, Karakatsanis, Côté, Brown and Rowe JJ
Douez v Facebook, Inc; 2017 SCC 33	Private intentional law – Jurisdiction	Côté J	Moldaver J
Ktunaxa Nation v British Columbia (Forests, Lands and Natural Resource Operations); 2017 SCC 54	Freedom of religion	Rowe J	Abella, Karakatsanis, Wagner, Gascon and Brown JJ
R v Marakah; 2017 SCC 59	Constitutional law – Admissibility of evidence derived from unreasonable search and seizure	–	Abella, Karakatsanis and Gascon JJ
Cowper-Smith v Morgan; 2017 SCC 61	Wills and estates and defence of proprietary estoppel	–	Abella, Moldaver, Karakatsanis, Wagner, Gascon and Rowe JJ
British Columbia (Human Rights Tribunal) v Schrenk; 2017 SCC 62	Discrimination on basis of employment	–	Côté and Brown JJ
Deloitte & Touche v Livent Inc (Receiver of); 2017 SCC 63	Tort of negligence; duty of care and negligent misrepresentation by auditor	–	Wagner and Côté JJ
