= R v Manninen =

Judgment of the Supreme Court of Canada

R v Manninen [1987] 1 S.C.R. 1233 is a Supreme Court of Canada decision on an accused Charter right to retain and instruct a lawyer (section 10(b)) as well as the right to silence (section 24(2)).

== Background ==
In October 1982, Ronald Charles Manninen robbed a local Mac's Milk store in downtown Toronto and escaped in a recently stolen car. The store owner reported to the police that the individual who robbed him had a knife and wore a grey hoodie. Two days later, two plainclothes police officers arrested Manninen at a simonizing store for theft, armed robbery, and possession of a stolen car. They read him his rights twice. Manninen said that he was not going to say anything until he consulted his lawyer. Even though there was a phone nearby, at no point did the police make any effort to allow him to contact his lawyer. Instead, they proceeded to ask questions, and at one point they say:

Q. Where is the knife that you had along with this (showing the respondent the CO_{2} gun found in the car) when you ripped off the Mac's Milk on Wilson Avenue?

A. He's lying. When I was in the store I only had the gun. The knife was in the tool box in the car.

This statement became the basis of his conviction at trial.

Manninen appealed on the basis that the questions violated his rights to counsel under section 10(b) as they did not provide him with the opportunity to call a lawyer and due to the violation the evidence obtained in violating his right should be excluded under section 24(2). The Court of Appeal agreed and overturned his conviction.

== Reasons of the court ==
Lamer, writing for a unanimous Court, upheld the decision of the Court of Appeal and held that Manninen's section 10(b) Charter right was violated and the evidence should be excluded.

Lamer identified two duties of the police officer when effecting an arrest. "First, the police must provide the detainee with a reasonable opportunity to exercise the right to retain and instruct counsel without delay". This further requires that the police facilitate contact with a lawyer by giving him access to a phone. Lamer suggests that the only situation where this would be excused would be in situations of urgency in continuing the investigation. However, there was no such situation here. Second, the police must "cease questioning or otherwise attempting to elicit evidence from the detainee until he has had a reasonable opportunity to retain and instruct counsel." The right to silence will only be effective if the accused is able to be informed of his or her rights by a lawyer prior to any questioning, and so ceasing questions is integral to the right to silence. Lamer briefly considered whether Manninen had implicitly waived his rights at any time but found no such act.

Given the violation, Lamer held that it should be excluded as the statement's inclusion would bring the administration of justice into disrepute under the Collins test. The violation was severe as it proved the basis of his conviction. As well, there was no justification as there was no urgency.

== Final Decision ==
The appeal was later dismissed with a vote of 8 to 1.
