= R v Harrison =

- Supreme Court of Canada

Hearing: December 9, 2008 Judgment: July 17, 2009
- Full case name: Bradley Harrison v. Her Majesty The Queen
- Citations: 2009 SCC 34
- Docket No.: 32487
- Prior history: Judgment for the Crown in the Court of Appeal for Ontario.
- Ruling: appeal allowed and acquittal entered

Holding
- To appear to condone wilful and flagrant Charter breaches amounting to a significant incursion on the accused’s rights does not enhance, but rather undermines, the long‑term repute of the administration of justice. The public expects police to adhere to higher standards than alleged criminals.

Court membership
- Chief Justice: Beverley McLachlin; Puisne Justices: Ian Binnie, Louis LeBel, Marie Deschamps, Morris Fish, Rosalie Abella, Louise Charron, Marshall Rothstein

Reasons given
- Majority: McLachlin C.J. (paras. 1-43), joined by Binnie, LeBel, Fish, Abella, and Charon JJ.
- Dissent: Deschamps J. (paras. 44-74)

R v Harrison [2009] S.C.R., 2009 SCC 34 is a decision of the Supreme Court of Canada on section 24(2) of the Canadian Charter of Rights and Freedoms. The decision was a companion case of R v Grant, and applied the Supreme Court's new test to determine when evidence obtained from a Charter breach should be excluded.

== Background ==
On October 24, 2004, Bradley Harrison was driving an SUV with a friend near Kirkland Lake, Ontario. They were driving from Vancouver to Toronto. Constable Bertoncello of the Ontario Provincial Police observed that the vehicle had no front license plate, an offence if the car is registered in Ontario. Bertoncello activated his emergency lights and pulled the car over. He then realized the vehicle was registered in Alberta and was not required to have a front license plate. He was also informed by radio dispatch that the vehicle had been rented in Vancouver. At that time, Bertoncello has no grounds to believe any offence was being committed.

Nonetheless, Bertoncello was suspicious. The vehicle appeared to be "lived-in", which suggested it had been driven directly through from Vancouver. He knew that rental cars were often used by drug couriers. He knew that it was rare for drivers to drive that stretch of the road at exactly the speed limit, which Harrison had been doing. Finally, Harrison and his friend gave contradictory stories when questioned separately.

Harrison was not able to provide his driver's license upon request, saying he left it in Vancouver. A computer check by Bertoncello revealed Harrison's license was currently suspended. He then arrested Harrison for driving with a suspended driver's license.

Bertoncello then asked Harrison and his friend if there were any drugs in the car. They both replied in the negative. Other police officers arrived, and Bertoncello began to search the car. He testified that he did so "incidental to the arrest" in order to find Harrison's driver's license - even though the license's whereabouts was irrelevant to the charge.

Bertoncello started the search in the rear cargo area. He found two cardboard boxes. The other occupant of the vehicle advised that they contained dishes and books for his mother. Bertoncello testified that the look and feel of the boxes suggested they did not contain dishes or books, and asked the occupant if the boxes contained drugs or weapons. The occupant became nervous, said "yeah", then said he did not know.

The boxes were opened, and were found to contain cocaine. Ultimately 35 kilograms of cocaine was found in the vehicle, which was estimated to be worth $4 million.

=== Trial ===
At the Superior Court of Ontario, the trial judge found the detention was based on a hunch or suspicion, and not on reasonable grounds. It was therefore an arbitrary detention and violated section 9 of the Charter. The judge also found that the search had nothing to do with why Harrison was arrested, and was therefore without lawful authority and violated section 8 of the Charter.

In determining whether the evidence should be excluded under section 24(2) of the Charter, the judge applied the test found in R. v. Collins. In determining the seriousness of the breach, the judge was highly critical of Bertoncello's actions. He found that the officer's intentions "'was to take whatever steps were necessary to determine whether his suspicions were correct', notwithstanding the lack of any legal basis for the stop or search", and that the officer's actions "can only be described as brazen and flagrant". He also found that Bertoncello's in court testimony was "contrived and defy credibility".

However, the trial judge found that the officer's actions "pale in comparison" with the 35 kilograms of cocaine found in Harrison's vehicle. He therefore found that administration of justice would suffer more if the cocaine was excluded, and admitted the evidence.

=== Ontario Court of Appeal ===
A majority of the Ontario Court of Appeal upheld the trial judge's decision to admit the evidence, calling it a "close call".

The dissenting judge felt that the majority "downplayed" the trial judge's characterization of Bertoncello's conduct, and felt that the trial judge erred by comparing the officer's actions with Harrison's criminal conduct.

The Court of Appeal's decision received significant media attention and editorials criticized the decision as a significant weakening of the Charter.

== Holding ==
Held (Deschamps J. dissenting): The appeal should be allowed and an acquittal entered.

Per McLachlin C.J. and Binnie, LeBel, Fish, Abella and Charron JJ.: The Charter breaches in this case are clear, the sole issue being whether the cocaine was properly admitted into evidence. Based on the revised framework set out in Grant, the three lines of inquiry relevant to determining whether the admission of the evidence would bring the administration of justice into disrepute are: (1) the seriousness of the Charter ‑infringing state conduct; (2) the impact of the breach on the Charter ‑protected interests of the accused; and (3) society’s interest in the adjudication of the case on its merits.

When the framework is applied to the facts of this case, the balancing of the factors favours exclusion of the evidence.

The majority judgment was written by McLachlin C.J.

The majority applied the new test for section 24(2) of the Charter, enunciated in the companion case of R. v. Grant. The Grant test replaced the test found in R. v. Collins and R. v. Stillman (which focused on the trial fairness and whether the evidence was conscriptive).

On the Seriousness of the Charter-Infringing State Conduct stage, the majority found that Bertoncello acted recklessly and represented a blatant disregard of Charter rights.

On the Impact of the Charter-Protected Interests of the Accused stage, the majority found that the detention affected the accused's rights to privacy and liberty, and that people on the highway have an expectation that they will be left alone except for valid highway traffic stops. In this case, the impact was significant, but not egregious.

On the Society's Interest in an Adjudication on the Merits stage, the majority found that the cocaine was reliable evidence, and favoured admission.

The majority went on to find that the trial judge placed undue emphasis on the last stage of the test. The test should not turn into comparing the police's conduct with the accused's criminal conduct, and that the public "expect[s] police to adhere to higher standards than alleged criminals." The majority went on to find that given the trial judge's characterization of the officer's conduct, the seriousness of the officer's conduct outweighed the reliability of the evidence.

A dissenting decision was written by Deschamps J. Following her decision in Grant, Deschamps J. proposed a different test for section 24(2) of the Charter. Deschamps J.'s proposed test would balance the impact on the accused (which includes the seriousness of the officer's conduct) with the reliability of the evidence. Under this test, Deschamps J. concluded that the evidence should have been admitted.

== See also ==
- List of Supreme Court of Canada cases (McLachlin Court)
- List of Supreme Court of Canada cases
