= Bradley Harrison =

Bradley Harrison may refer to:

- Brad Harrison (born 1972), venture capitalist and business development executive
- Bradley Harrison of R. v. Harrison, a 2009 decision of the Supreme Court of Canada
- Bradley Harrison (born 2000), CTO of PoolFunds, Founder of Fyuzed
