= R v Tse =

- Supreme Court of Canada

Hearing: November 18, 2011 Judgment: April 13, 2012
- Full case name: Her Majesty The Queen v Yat Fung Albert Tse, Nhan Trong Ly, Viet Bac Nguyen, Huong Dac Doan, Daniel Luis Soux and Myles Alexander Vandrick
- Citations: 2012 SCC 16
- Docket No.: 33751
- Prior history: Judgment against the Crown in the British Columbia Court of Appeal.
- Ruling: Appeal dismissed.

Holding
- The emergency wiretap provisions of the Criminal Code (Canada), which permits wiretaps in certain situations without prior judicial authorization, infringe section 8 of the Canadian Charter of Rights and Freedoms, and cannot be justified under section 1 of the Charter, since there are no accountability measures.

Court membership
- Chief Justice: Beverley McLachlin; Puisne Justices: Louis LeBel, Marie Deschamps, Morris Fish, Rosalie Abella, Marshall Rothstein, Thomas Cromwell, Michael Moldaver, Andromache Karakatsanis

Reasons given
- Unanimous reasons by: Moldaver and Karakatsanis JJ

R v Tse [2012] 1 S.C.R. 531, 2012 SCC 16 is a Supreme Court of Canada decision regarding the constitutionality of warrant-less wiretaps in emergency situations. The Court found that the emergency wiretap provisions found in section 184.4 of the Criminal Code infringe on the search and seizure rights in section 8 of the Canadian Charter of Rights and Freedoms and cannot be justified as a reasonable limitation under section 1 of the Charter, due to the lack of accountability measures.

In addition to the two parties to the case (the Attorney General of British Columbia and the various defendants), the Court heard from the following interveners: the Attorney General of Canada, the Attorney General of Ontario, the Attorney General of Quebec, the Criminal Lawyers' Association (Ontario), the British Columbia Civil Liberties Association, and the Canadian Civil Liberties Association. The unanimous decision of the Court was the first Supreme Court of Canada decision written by Justices Moldaver and Karakatsanis.

== Background ==
=== Section 184.4 of the Criminal Code ===
Generally, the police cannot intercept a person's private telecommunications (such as a wiretap), with certain exceptions, such as the consent of one of the parties to the communications in combination with judicial authorization, or with a warrant. and

Section 184.4 of the Criminal Code does not require any prior judicial authorization. Instead, three requirements must be met:

1. The police officer has reasonable grounds that due to the urgency of the situation, prior judicial authorization cannot be obtained with reasonable diligence,
2. The police officer has reasonable grounds that the interception is necessary to prevent an unlawful act that would cause serious harm to any person or property, and
3. Either the person sending the communication or the person intended to receive the communication is the person who would perform the unlawful act in question, or is the victim or intended victim of the harm.

=== Incident ===
After family members received phone calls from an alleged kidnapping victim, where the victim stated he was being held for ransom, the police initiated an emergency wiretap under section 184.4. Approximately 24 hours later, they received judicial authorization for the wiretap.

=== Judicial history ===
As a result of the wiretap evidence, Yat Fung Albert Tse, Nhan Trong Ly, Viet Bac Nguyen, Huong Dac Doan, Daniel Luis Soux and Myles Alexander Vandrick were charged with various offences related to the kidnapping.

At the trial, the trial judge found that section 184.4 was unconstitutional, as it violated section 8 of the Canadian Charter of Rights and Freedoms. This decision was part of a line of cases in the trial courts of British Columbia, Quebec and Ontario which found section 184.4 unconstitutional (but which differed in how to remedy the situation). The evidence was nonetheless admitted as evidence under section 24(2) of the Charter. The defendants were found guilty, and were sentenced between 10 and 18 years.

The trial judge's decision on the constitutionality of the legislation was upheld by the British Columbia Court of Appeal, and was appealed by the Crown to Supreme Court of Canada.

== Reasons of the Court ==
The unanimous reasons of the Court were written by Moldaver and Karakatsanis JJ.

=== General constitutionality ===
The Court first noted that as a general proposition, unauthorized wiretaps in emergency situations could be constitutional, if the authorization was legislated correctly.

=== Scope of section 184.4 ===
The Court noted that section 184.4 was the only provision in Canadian law for a wiretap that did not require the consent of one of the parties or require a pre-authorization, does not require prior notice, and has no legislated or judicially authorized time-limits. However, section 184.4 is limited to emergency situations where there is serious and imminent harm.

The Court also found that the terms used in section 184.4 were not overly broad or vague. The Court also provided a limited scope of who could be considered a "victim".

Although there is specified time-limit, the Court noted that as time goes on, there will be less justification for the argument that authorization cannot be obtained with reasonable diligence.

=== Interpretation in relation to section 188 ===
Section 188 allows the police to seek prior judicial authorization in urgent situations. The Court found that section 188 does not do away with the need to be able to do a wiretap in an emergency situation, where even the reduced amount of time to obtain the section 188 authorization would take too long.

=== Lack of notice requirement ===
Other emergency legislation in Canada, which do not require prior judicial authorization, still requires an "after-the-fact" notice to be made to a judge or justice of the peace. Section 184.4 has no "after-the-fact" notice requirement.

The Court found that notice ensured that the police would not abuse their extraordinary powers, and provides transparency to the process. As a result, the Court concluded that the lack of "after-the-fact" notice provisions rendered the current legislation unconstitutional.

=== Lack of reporting requirement to Parliament ===
Other wiretap provisions requires that Parliament be notified of each wiretap, so that Parliament can keep track of the frequency wiretaps are made, and under what circumstances. Section 184.4 has no reporting requirement.

The Court found that since reporting to Parliament does not create active oversight of wiretaps generally, the lack of reporting does not make the provisions unconstitutional.

=== Lack of record-keeping requirement ===
The Court found that a record-keeping requirement would also increase accountability, but would not be necessary if there was a notice requirement. In an emergency situation, record-keeping may be impracticable.

=== Lack of limitations on use of interceptions ===
Section 184.1 of the Criminal Code, which allows wiretaps to prevent bodily harm, prevents the intercepted communications from being admitted as evidence, except in proceedings related to bodily harm. Section 184.4 has no similar limitations.

The Court noted that sections 184.1 and 184.4 had different pre-requisites, and such statutory limitations for section 184.4 were not necessary. The Court chose not to comment on whether the intercepts would be admissible in proceedings unrelated to the emergency situation.

=== Section 1 of the Charter ===
Since the provisions were found unconstitutional due to the lack of accountability measures, the Court went on to decide where the legislation could be justified under the Oakes test for section 1 of the Charter.

The second stage of the Oakes test requires that proportionality between the legislation and the objectives of the legislation. In this case, the ability to meet the objective of section 184.4 (using wiretaps in emergency situations) would not be impacted by a notice requirement. It would allow targeted individuals to later challenge invasions of privacy and obtain meaningful remedies. As a result, the Court found there was a lack of proportionality, and could not be saved under section 1 of the Charter.

=== Remedy ===
While it was open to the Court to read in a notice requirement, the Court found that it would be inappropriate in this case due to other concerns about the legislation expressed to the Court that the Court chose not to rule on.

Therefore, the Court declared the legislation unconstitutional, but stayed the effect of their ruling for 12 months to give time for Parliament to enact a new version.

== Aftermath ==
In the decision of R v Tse, the Supreme Court of Canada found that a wiretap authority without a court authorization in situations of imminent harm could be justified under the Canadian Charter of Rights and Freedoms. However, the Court declared that Section 184.4 of the Criminal Code (interception in exceptional circumstances), which was enacted in 1993, was unconstitutional because it contained no accountability measures. The Supreme Court gave Parliament until April 13, 2013 to amend the provision to make it constitutionally compliant.

On February 11, 2013, the Honourable Rob Nicholson, P.C., Q.C., M.P. for Niagara Falls, Minister of Justice and Attorney General of Canada, introduced Bill C-55, An Act to amend the Criminal Code ("Response to the Supreme Court of Canada Decision in R. v. Tse Act") that directly responds to the Supreme Court of Canada decision in R v Tse.

During his press conference on the same day, Minister Nicholson said the controversial Bill C-30, known as the online surveillance or warrantless wiretapping bill, won't go ahead due to opposition from the public.

=== Changes made by Bill C-55 ===
Unlike its predecessor, the new bill, C-55, simply responds to the guidance from the Supreme Court by adding the safeguards of "notification" and "reporting" to section 184.4 of the Criminal Code. Bill C-55 would make three specific changes:

1. Notification within 90 days – Notification would require that persons whose private communications have been intercepted in situations of imminent harm be notified within 90 days (subject to any extensions granted by a judge).
2. Annual reports – Reporting would require annual reports on the use of imminent harm wiretaps.
3. Restricting the usage – The changes would limit the authority to use this provision to police officers (currently, it is available to the broader category of peace officers) and only to the offences listed in section 183 of the Criminal Code.

Bill C-55 is supported by the New Democratic Party (NDP) and by the Liberal Party of Canada.

=== Critiques ===
Ms. Françoise Boivin, NDP member from Gatineau and her party’s justice critic, made some critical remarks when Bill C-55 was debated at second in the House of Commons: "I cannot believe that the brilliant legal minds at the Department of Justice took 11 months to draft Bill C-55. The fact is that the Conservatives made a serious mistake at the outset. They introduced Bill C-30 thinking that it would solve every conceivable problem related to wiretaps."

Mr. Francis Scarpaleggia (Lac-Saint-Louis, Lib.) made similar critical remarks: "Mr. Speaker, Bill C-55, the bill we are debating today, needs to be seen against the backdrop of Bill C-30, the government's Internet surveillance bill introduced in February 2012. When Bill C-30 was tabled it crashed and burned, largely because the government failed to do its homework. Mainly, the government did not Charter-proof the bill or listen to telecommunications service providers about the impracticality of some of Bill C-30's key provisions, nor did the government properly gauge Canadians' views about such a bill in advance of introducing it."

=== Proposed amendment to Bill C-55 ===
When the British Columbia Civil Liberties Association (BCCLA) appeared before the Parliamentary Standing Committee on Justice and Human Rights on March 6, 2013, it demanded changes to Bill C-55, which would allow emergency warrantless wiretaps of unlimited duration. In particular, the BCCLA urged Parliament to limit emergency warrantless wiretapping by the police to a 24-hour period.

Ms. Raji Mangat, Counsel at the BCCLA, said during her testimony, "A wiretap captures all communications taking place on the tapped device, including any and all manner of private, personal and possibly even privileged, confidential communications. Sweeping powers that intrude on the privacy rights of individuals must be appropriately limited by the law. We understand that in very narrow circumstances, the police may need to act immediately to stop serious and imminent harm. However, it is all the more important that this extraordinary power not be used indefinitely where no warrant is required. A 24-hour limit on the use of the warrantless wiretap will give the police clear guidance about how they can use this power appropriately."

Despite this concern, the BCCLA’s proposed amendment was not accepted by Conservative committee members and Bill C-55 has been reported back to the House of Commons unamended.

=== Royal Assent and Coming Into Force ===
Bill C-55 passed its third reading in the House of Commons on March 20, 2013. On March 26, 2013, Bill C-55 has been adopted by the Senate legislative committee. It was subsequently referred back to the Senate for the third reading and received Royal Assent on March 27, 2013.

== See also ==
- List of Supreme Court of Canada cases (McLachlin Court)
- R v Duarte
