= R v Feeney =

- Supreme Court of Canada

Hearing: June 11, 1996 Judgment: May 22, 1997
- Full case name: Michael Feeney v Her Majesty The Queen
- Citations: [1997] 2 S.C.R. 13; (1997), 146 D.L.R. (4th) 609; [1997] 6 W.W.R. 634; (1997), 115 C.C.C. (3d) 129; (1997), 44 C.R.R. (2d) 1; (1997), 7 C.R. (5th) 101
- Docket No.: 24752
- Prior history: Judgment for the Crown in the British Columbia Court of Appeal.

Court membership
- Chief Justice: Antonio Lamer; Puisne Justices: Gérard La Forest, Claire L'Heureux-Dubé, John Sopinka, Charles Gonthier, Peter Cory, Beverley McLachlin, Frank Iacobucci, John C. Major

Reasons given
- Majority: Sopinka J., joined by LaForest, Cory, Iacobucci, and Major JJ.
- Dissent: L'Heureux-Dubé J., joined by Gonthier and McLachlin JJ.
- Dissent: Lamer C.J. (paras. 1-3)

R v Feeney, [1997] 2 S.C.R. 13 is a leading decision of the Supreme Court of Canada on the right, under section 8 of the Canadian Charter of Rights and Freedoms against unreasonable search and seizure. The Court held that the police are not permitted to enter into someone's house without a search warrant.

== Background ==
On the morning of June 8, 1991, 85-year-old Frank Boyle was found dead in his Likely, British Columbia, home from several severe blows to the head with a crowbar. At the scene, the police found a Sportsman brand cigarette, and later found Mr. Boyle's truck abandoned in a ditch. On a tip from local residents, the police located the driver of the truck, Michael Feeney, sleeping in a trailer behind the residence of a friend of his.

The police knocked on the trailer door, and shouted "police", but there was no reply. Guns drawn, the police entered. They found Feeney in bed and shook his leg to get his attention. The police asked him to get up and go outside where the light was better. Upon getting Mr. Feeney outside, the police noticed his clothes were covered in blood. They read him his rights, he acknowledged he understood them, and they arrested him.

Upon questioning him, Mr. Feeney said that the blood was from getting hit by a baseball the day before. The police further noted the same brand of cigarettes in the trailer as was found in Mr. Boyle's house. He was taken to an RCMP detachment, finger printed, made to use a breathalyzer, and for the first day or so was unsuccessful in contacting a lawyer. During this time, he was questioned further, admitting he had hit and robbed Boyle. Once a search warrant was obtained, the police found Boyle's stolen property in the trailer. It was only after all of this that he finally met with a lawyer.

At trial in the Supreme Court of British Columbia he was convicted of second degree murder.

== Reasons of the court ==
The majority was written by Sopinka J, La Forest, Cory, Iacobucci and Major JJ concurring.

=== Section 8 of the Charter ===
Sopinka first considered the leading case of R. v. Landry [1986] on warrantless arrests in a dwelling, which held that a police officer could only arrest if there are "reasonable and probable grounds" to believe that the person is on the premises, the proper announcement is made before entering, and that the officer reasonably believes that the person has committed or will commit an indictable offence. "Reasonable and probable grounds" must be found on subjective and objective grounds (R. v. Storrey [1990]), however, Sopinka held that there were no such grounds in this situation. The officer had admitted that he didn't think he had proper ground to enter at the time. He then went one step further and held that R. v. Landry is bad law in post-Charter law and that any entry into dwellings must be done with a warrant. http://csc.lexum.umontreal.ca/en/1986/1986scr1-145/1986scr1-145.pdf

=== Section 24(2) of the Charter ===
Exclusionary rules of evidence based on section 8 violations of the Charter of Rights and Freedoms. A voir dire is held by the trial judge to review the evidence in question before it is presented to the court or jury. This helps to ensure that any evidence brought before the courts has been legally seized by the police and that it does not bring the administration of justice into disrepute.

== Dissent ==
Two dissents were written, one by L'Heureux-Dubé J., with Gonthier and McLachlin JJ concurring, and another by Lamer CJ.
