= R v Ladouceur =

- Supreme Court of Canada

Hearing: November 6, 1989 Judgment: May 31, 1990
- Full case name: Gerald Jay Ladouceur v Her Majesty The Queen
- Citations: [1990] 1 S.C.R. 1257

Court membership
- Chief Justice: Brian Dickson; Puisne Justices: Antonio Lamer, Bertha Wilson, Gérard La Forest, Claire L'Heureux-Dubé, John Sopinka, Charles Gonthier, Peter Cory, Beverley McLachlin

Reasons given
- Majority: Cory J., joined by Lamer, L'Heureux-Dubé, Gonthier and McLachlin JJ.
- Concurrence: Sopinka J., joined by Dickson C.J. and Wilson and La Forest JJ.

R v Ladouceur, [1990] 1 S.C.R. 1257 is a leading decision of the Supreme Court of Canada on the constitutionality of random police traffic checks. The Court found that the random checks violated the right not to be arbitrarily detained or imprisoned under section 9 of the Canadian Charter of Rights and Freedoms. However, the violation was saved under section 1 as it was a valid form of deterrence for a pressing problem of traffic safety.

== Background ==
Gerald Ladouceur was pulled over by the police as part of a random traffic check. The police discovered that he was driving with a suspended licence. He was convicted of driving without a licence.

Ladouceur challenged the provision of the Highway Traffic Act which authorized the police officers to do random traffic checks as a violation of sections 7, 8, and 9 of the Charter. The conviction was upheld on appeal.

== Reasons of the court ==
Justice Cory, writing for the majority, upheld the conviction. He found that there was clearly a violation of section 9 as the basis for the stops were in the complete discretion of the police and entirely arbitrary. Furthermore, the consequences of failing to yield to the detention included severe penalties.

He found that the act of stopping drivers did not constitute a "search" or a "seizure" and so did not invoke section 8. Lastly, Cory refused to consider whether there was a violation of section 7, given that there was already a violation of section 9.

The violation of section 9 was justified as a reasonable limitation under section 1. The government successfully established that there was a pressing and substantial objective of increasing highway safety, and that random stops were an effective means of achieving the objective through deterrence. This position was further supported by evidence of its effectiveness in other countries as well.

== See also ==
- List of Supreme Court of Canada cases (Dickson Court)
