= R v Stillman =

- Supreme Court of Canada

Hearing: January 26, 1996 November 7, 1996 Judgment: March 20, 1997
- Full case name: William Wayne Dale Stillman v Her Majesty The Queen
- Citations: [1997] 1 SCR 607, 185 NBR (2d) 1, 185 NBR (2e) 1, 144 DLR (4th) 193, 113 CC (3d) 321, 42 CRR (2d) 189, 5 CR (5th) 1
- Prior history: Judgment for the Crown in the New Brunswick Court of Appeal

Court membership
- Chief Justice: Antonio Lamer; Puisne Justices: Gérard La Forest, Claire L'Heureux-Dubé, John Sopinka, Charles Gonthier, Peter Cory, Beverley McLachlin, Frank Iacobucci, John C. Major

Reasons given
- Majority: Cory J (paras 1–129), joined by Lamer C.J. and La Forest, Sopinka and Iacobucci
- Concurrence: Major J (paras 273–279)
- Dissent: MacLachlin J (paras 130–192)
- Dissent: L'Heureux-Dubé J (paras 194–272)
- Dissent: Gonthier J (para 193)

Laws applied
- R v Legere (1988), 89 NBR (2d) 361; R v Paul (1994), 155 NBR (2d) 195

R v Stillman [1997] 1 SCR 607, 1997 SCC 32 was a leading decision of the Supreme Court of Canada on section 24(2) of the Constitution of Canada which allowed for the exclusion of evidence that is obtained in a manner that infringes the Charter. The two-step Stillman test was developed for determining whether the admission of evidence that was obtained through a breach of a Charter right would affect the fairness of the trial. The issue of trial fairness comes into play when applying the first step of the Collins test to exclude evidence under section 24(2).

The case would later be replaced by the Supreme Court of Canada's decision in R v Grant.

== Background ==
In 1991, a young New Brunswick girl was found raped and murdered. A 17-year-old suspect, William Stillman, was arrested for the murder. Stillman's lawyer told the police that he did not consent to the taking of any bodily samples. Nevertheless, the police took an impression of his teeth, a hair sample, and saliva sample. As well, they took a paper tissue used by Stillman who had thrown it into the garbage while in custody.

In a six-to-three decision, with Major J writing a concurring opinion, the Court held that all the evidence collected was beyond the powers to search incident to arrest and that it was all "conscriptive" evidence and thus was in violation of section 8.

== Reasons of the court ==
The majority's reasons were given by Cory J.

The case turned on whether the inclusion of evidence affected trial fairness. Cory re-examined the purpose of the trial fairness step of the Collins test, stating that:

[its] primary purpose ... is to prevent an accused person whose Charter rights have been infringed from being forced or conscripted to provide evidence in the form of statements or bodily samples for the benefit of the state. It is because the accused is compelled ... to participate in the creation or discover of self-incriminating evidence ... that the admission of that evidence would generally tend to render the trial unfair.

Cory proposed a two-step approach to determine the effect of the admission of evidence on trial fairness.

1. Can the evidence be classified as "conscriptive"? Namely, was the accused compelled to participate in the creation or discovery of the evidence?
2. If so, was the evidence "discoverable"? Namely, would the evidence have been discovered by an alternate non-conscriptive means?

If the evidence was shown to be conscriptive and would not have been discovered by a non-conscriptive means then the evidence must be excluded for trial fairness, and none of the other factors of the Collins test need to be examined.

On the first step, the question is whether "the accused was compelled to make a statement or provide a bodily substance in violation of the Charter." The evidence must not have existed in a usable form prior to the taking of evidence. A murder weapon found at the scene would be non-conscriptive but a piece of clothing worn by the suspect would be conscriptive. Conscriptive evidence also includes "derivative evidence", which is evidence that was only discovered through other conscripted evidence. Physical evidence found as a result of a conscriptive statement is an example of derivative evidence.

On the second step, the courts allow conscriptive evidence if it can be shown to be "discoverable".

the admission of conscriptive evidence will not render the trial unfair where the impugned evidence would have been discovered in the absence of the unlawful conscription of the accused. There are two principal bases upon which it could be demonstrated that the evidence would have been discovered. The first is where an independent source of the evidence exists. The second is where the discovery of the evidence was inevitable.

== Dissent ==
McLachlin, L'Heureux-Dubé and Gonthier JJ each gave their own dissenting opinions.

McLachlin first noted that the taking of bodily samples is a matter of section 8 of the Charter rather than section 7. The protection of section 7 against self-incrimination only extends to testimonial and derivative evidence but not physical evidence. To extend the section farther would go beyond the intended limits in both Canada and other comparable justice systems around the world.

McLachlin agreed with the majority that the taking of hair samples, buccal swabs, and dental impressions were serious violations under section 8. However, the collection of the tissue was not, as the tissue had been abandoned and it was not derivative evidence. Though the samples were created as a result of detention, the bodily state that they represent was not created by detention and exist outside of the detention.

Section 24(2), McLachlin stated, requires balancing of all the circumstances of the case with the effect of admitting the evidence on the reputation of the system. The three set of factors in R v Collins are only convenient groupings of these circumstances that may be useful. So long as the effect of the admission of evidence on the system is balanced against the effect of the exclusion then the analysis is complete.

McLachlin rejected Cory's ruling that all evidence which affects trial fairness must be excluded. Such a rule is against the spirit of section 24(2) which intends to balance the alternate effects upon the repute of the system. It also mistakenly equates non-consensual participation with trial fairness. Lastly, it suggests that any amount of trial unfairness automatically outweighs any other possible factors that may come into play.

On the facts, McLachlin held that the lower courts properly weighed the factors and that they were correct in admitting the evidence.

== Subsequent Decisions ==
In 2009, the Supreme Court of Canada found that the analysis of conscripted versus non-conscripted evidence was leading to inconsistent results in analyzing section 24(2), and created a new test in R v Grant
