= R v Suberu =

- Supreme Court of Canada

Hearing: April 15, 2008 Judgment: July 17, 2009
- Full case name: Musibau Suberu v Her Majesty The Queen
- Citations: 2009 SCC 33
- Docket No.: 31912
- Prior history: Judgment for the Crown in the Court of Appeal for Ontario.
- Ruling: appeal dismissed

Holding
- (1) "Without delay" in s. 10(b) of the Canadian Charter of Rights and Freedoms regarding being informed of rights to counsel after arrest or detention means "immediately", subject to officer safety and limitations prescribed by law and justified under s. 1 of the Charter. (2) Not every interaction with the police is a detention, and police are allowed to interact with members of the public without having to have specific grounds connecting the individual to the commission of a crime.

Court membership
- Chief Justice: Beverley McLachlin; Puisne Justices: Michel Bastarache, Ian Binnie, Louis LeBel, Marie Deschamps, Morris Fish, Rosalie Abella, Louise Charron, Marshall Rothstein

Reasons given
- Majority: McLachlin C.J. and Charon J. (paras. 1-46), joined by LeBel, Deschamps, Abella JJ.
- Dissent: Binnie J. (paras. 47-64)
- Dissent: Fish J. (paras. 65-67)

R v Suberu 2009 SCC 33 is a leading decision of the Supreme Court of Canada on section 9 and section 10 of the Canadian Charter of Rights and Freedoms. The Court applied the new test for detention created in the companion case of R v Grant and ruled on the timing of when an individual is required to be informed of his or her rights to counsel after being arrested or detained.

== Background ==
On June 13, 2008, Musibau Suberu and a colleague made a one-day shopping trip east of Toronto to purchase merchandise, pre-paid shopping cards, and gift certificates from Wal-Mart and the LCBO using a stolen credit card. The staff of a store in Cobourg, Ontario were warned to look out for the pair, after they reportedly bought $100 gift certificates from a different store using the stolen credit card. When Suberu's associate went to buy some merchandise at the Cobourg store with a $100 gift certificate, store employees began to stall Suberu's associate.

A police constable unaware of the background was dispatched to respond to a call about a male person using a stolen credit card at the Cobourg store. An officer who arrived earlier radioed the police constable to inform him there were two male suspects. When the police constable arrived, the other officer was dealing with Suberu's associate. Suberu walked past the police constable, and said "he did this, not me, so I guess I can go." The police constable followed Suberu outside and said "Wait a minute. I need to talk to you before you go anywhere" while Suberu was getting into the driver's side of a minivan.

While Suberu was seated in the driver's seat of the van, the police constable asked him some quick questions about who he was with in the store, where they had come from, and who owned the van. After this conversation, the police constable was informed by radio dispatch of the description and license plate of the van that had been involved with using the stolen credit card. The minivan Suberu was in matched the description and license plate. When the constable looked into the van, he saw bags of merchandise from Wal-Mart and the LCBO.

Suberu was arrested for fraud. He was informed of the constable's reasons for doing so. Before the constable could read him his rights to counsel, Suberu made statements protesting his innocence and began asking questions of the constable. The police constable had a short exchange with Suberu but soon told Suberu "just listen" and read the rights to counsel.

There was no issue about the timing of the rights to counsel in relation to the arrest. The issue was whether the police constable should have informed Suberu of his rights to counsel at the outset of their interaction, arguing that the constable's instruction to "wait" meant that there was a detention, triggering section 10 of the Charter.

At the Ontario Court of Justice, the trial judge found that there was a necessary "momentary investigative detention". However, the trial judge went on to find that the police were not required to inform Suberu of his rights to counsel before he was asked preliminary or exploratory questions to determine if there was any involvement by Suberu. Suberu was convicted of possession of property obtained by crime, possession of a stolen credit card, and possession of a stolen debit card.

At the Ontario Superior Court of Justice, the summary conviction appeal judge upheld the conviction, but on the basis that section 10(b) of the Charter is never engaged by investigative detentions.

The Court of Appeal for Ontario rejected the summary conviction appeal judge's proposition, but dismissed the appeal on the basis that the wording of "without delay" in section 10(b) of the Charter allows for a brief interlude at the beginning of an investigative detention to allow police to ask exploratory questions to determine whether further detention is necessary.

== Reasons of the court ==
The majority judgment was given by McLachlin C.J. and Charron J.

=== Detention ===
The majority followed the test for detention set out in the companion case of R. v. Grant:

Detention under ss. 9 and 10 of the Charter refers to a suspension of the individual’s liberty interest by a significant physical or psychological restraint. Psychological detention is established either where the individual has a legal obligation to comply with the restrictive request or demand, or a reasonable person would conclude by reason of the state conduct that he or she had no choice but to comply.

In cases where there is no physical restraint or legal obligation, it may not be clear whether a person has been detained. To determine whether the reasonable person in the individual’s circumstances would conclude that he or she had been deprived by the state of the liberty of choice, the court may consider, inter alia, the following factors:

a) The circumstances giving rise to the encounter as they would reasonably be perceived by the individual: whether the police were providing general assistance; maintaining general order; making general inquiries regarding a particular occurrence; or, singling out the individual for focussed investigation.

b) The nature of the police conduct, including the language used; the use of physical contact; the place where the interaction occurred; the presence of others; the duration of the encounter.

c) The particular characteristics or circumstances of the individual where relevant, including age; physical stature; minority status; level of sophistication.

Suberu was not physically detained and did not face any legal obligations to comply with the officer's request to wait. Therefore, the remaining question was whether the police officer's conduct would lead a reasonable person to believe that he had no choice but to comply.

The majority found that police can ask exploratory questions of an individual without there being a detention.

In this case, the circumstances as would be reasonably perceived by Suberu were that the police officer was orienting himself to the situation and was not specifically concluding that Suberu was involved in the commission of a crime. The majority also noted that Suberu did not testify, and that there was no evidence of what Suberu actually perceived.

The police conduct also supported the conclusion that there was no detention. The officer did not attempt to obstruct Suberu's movement, allowed Suberu to sit in the driver's seat of his van, and it was of a very brief duration.

Since Suberu did not testify, there was no evidence of his particular personal circumstances, either from him or from the testimony of the other witnesses. Suberu never indicated he did not want to answer the officer's questions, and the officer testified the conversation was not "strained".

Therefore, the majority concluded there was no detention prior to Suberu's arrest, and therefore there was no violation of Suberu's rights under section 10(b) of the Charter.

In a dissenting decision, Binnie J. noted that he proposed a different test for detention in Grant, but that Suberu was entitled to the test the majority handed down in Grant. However, in applying the majority's test for detention, he concluded that there was a detention (based on the fact that Suberu would reasonably have concluded that the police were investigating him for the use of the stolen credit card and that he had been told to "wait").

In a second dissenting decision, Fish J. agreed with the majority's test, but agreed with Binnie's J.'s application of the test.

=== "Without Delay" ===
Although there was no need for the majority to address the issue (since they concluded there was no detention), they still decided to rule on the issue. The majority concluded that "without delay" for the purpose of section 10(b) of the Charter means "immediately". This is due to the vulnerability of the detainee in relation to the state. The majority found that the Court of Appeal's proposition would have created an ill-defined and unworkable test - brief exploratory questioning is an abstract concept and difficult to quantify, and section 10(b) is intended to impose specific obligations on the police. The only exceptions to "immediately" are concerns for officer and public safely, and limitations prescribed by law that are justified under section 1 of the Charter.

Binnie J. agreed with the majority's interpretation. Fish J. did not expressly state his opinion on the issue, but did note that "upon detention, Mr. Suberu was not given his rights under s. 10 of the Charter."

=== Section One of the Charter ===
Although there are situations when section 1 of the Charter would allow for a justified limitation on the 'immediacy' requirement for rights to counsel, the majority concluded that a case had not been made out for allowing some type of limitation for investigative questioning. The majority found that the argument was based on a broader interpretation of "detention" than was decided in Grant. Since the majority ruled that the police are allowed to interact with the public without engaging an investigative detention, there was no need to create a section 1 limitation.

Binnie J., after concluding that the type of questions did constitute a detention, found that the Crown could argue for a section 1 limitation. However, Binnie J. found that there was no sufficient evidence or arguments before the Court to allow for the point to be properly adjudicated. Fish J. did not expressly state his opinion on the issue.

== See also ==
- Criminal law of Canada
- List of Supreme Court of Canada cases
- R. v. Mann, 2004 SCC 52
