= Canada Trustco Mortgage Co v Canada =

- Supreme Court of Canada

Hearing: December 10, 2010 Judgment: July 15, 2011
- Full case name: Canada Trustco Mortgage Company v. Her Majesty The Queen
- Citations: 2011 SCC 36, [2011] 2 S.C.R. 635
- Docket No.: 33422
- Prior history: Judgment for the Crown in the Federal Court of Appeal, affirming a decision of the Tax Court of Canada.
- Ruling: Appeal allowed.

Holding
- 1. The entirety of a cheque, including any instructions on the front and back, must be considered when determining whom the bank has a liability with in paying the money.; 2. After a cheque has been delivered to a bank for deposit, the person providing the cheque no longer has an entitlement to it, and is not part of the contractual relationship between the bank and the bank account holder.

Court membership
- Chief Justice: Beverley McLachlin; Puisne Justices: Ian Binnie, Louis LeBel, Marie Deschamps, Morris Fish, Rosalie Abella, Louise Charron, Marshall Rothstein, Thomas Cromwell

Reasons given
- Majority: Deschamps J., joined by Binnie, Rothstein, and Cromwell JJ.
- Dissent: McLachlin C.J., joined by Fish and Abella JJ.
- LeBel and Charron JJ. took no part in the consideration or decision of the case.

Canada Trustco Mortgage Co v Canada [2011] 2 S.C.R. 635, 2011 SCC 36 is a significant case of the Supreme Court of Canada on the intersection of the Income Tax Act and the Bills of Exchange Act and the ability to seize funds that have been deposited by a debtor into an account held at a financial institution in Canada.

== The facts ==
McLeod, a practising member of the Law Society of British Columbia, kept a trust account with Canada Trustco for the purposes of his legal practice. In addition, he and another lawyer held a joint account at the same branch.

Each account was subject to an agreement. McLeod owed taxes to the federal government. The Minister discovered that cheques payable to McLeod were being drawn on the trust account and deposited in the joint account.

During the period in question, each cheque was drawn on the trust account, payable to McLeod, and was delivered to Trustco with instructions conveyed by writing "Dep to" and the account number on the back of the cheque.

As the Minister did not have the ability to seize funds from either the trust account or the joint account (because the tax debt was solely in McLeod's name), he therefore focused on the cheques that had been issued, and issued three requirements to pay to Trustco. According to these requirements, Trustco was to pay to the Receiver General moneys otherwise payable to McLeod.

In response to the requirements to pay, Trustco disputed its liability on the ground that it was "not indebted to the [taxpayer] alone". The Minister assessed Trustco for the amounts of the cheques for failing to comply with the three requirements to pay. Trustco filed notices of objection. After they were rejected, it appealed to the Tax Court of Canada.

== The courts below ==
The Tax Court of Canada dismissed the Bank's appeal. Little J. held that the proceeds of the cheques were "payable" to McLeod because the debtor-creditor relationship between Trustco and Mr. McLeod required the former to repay the funds deposited in the trust account to the account holder on demand. In his view, Trustco's liability arose when Mr. McLeod "presented the bank with the cheques". This led Little J. to conclude that he did not need to examine the fact that the moneys had actually been transferred from the trust account to the joint account. Therefore, the Minister's requirement to pay had effect.

The Federal Court of Appeal found that no "palpable or overriding error" had been made and unanimously upheld Little J.'s decision.

== Appeal to the Supreme Court ==
On a 4-3 majority, the appeal was allowed and the assessments vacated.

At the hearing, Trustco argued that the trial judge failed to differentiate between a demand for repayment of funds deposited in an account and the delivery of a cheque for deposit. In its view, it was liable only — as drawee — to pay funds out of the trust account upon proper presentment for payment by the holder of the cheque. At no point was it liable to make a payment to McLeod, the tax debtor. For its part, Canada contended that there was no distinction between presentment of a cheque to the drawee for the payment of cash to McLeod and presentment of a cheque for deposit to the joint account. Its position is that when McLeod delivered the cheques to Trustco and instructed it to pay the amounts into the joint account, he acted as payee, creditor, drawer, and depositor, but that his role as depositor was irrelevant.

=== The majority judgment ===
The Bank was at no point liable to pay M the proceeds of the cheques. The fact that a person is designated as payee on the face of a cheque does not on its own mean that a bank is liable to make a payment to the person. A drawee is answerable to the drawer. The question is to whom the drawee may make the payment. What is on the back of the cheque — the instructions or the endorsement — is crucial to this question. In this case, the instructions were to deposit the cheques into the joint account. The Bank's liability to pay monies to M personally cannot be confused with its liability to pay monies to the holders of the joint account. There were no instructions that made the monies payable to M.

There was nothing in the contractual relationships, the Bills of Exchange Act or the common law that would indicate otherwise. In crediting the joint account, sending the cheques to a third party for clearing, and receiving the proceeds, the Bank was acting on the basis of its contractual relationship with the holders of the joint account and not on behalf of M personally. When the Bank debited the trust account the next day, it was not making a payment to M or to an agent acting for him alone. The Bank owed no money to M, as it was acting as the collecting bank for its customers, the holders of the joint account. It did not collect the proceeds of the cheques as agent for the payee, M.

=== The dissent ===
The minority disagreed with respect to two narrow points, declaring (based on the Court's opinion in B.M.P. Global Distribution Inc. v. Bank of Nova Scotia):

- the bank does not become the holder of a cheque, but rather collects the funds as agent for its principal, and
- a bank receives the funds as the payee's agent, and while they are in transit the funds are only payable to the payee.

Subsection 165(3) of the BEA does not establish that the bank becomes a holder of the cheque ― its limited objective is achieved by granting the collecting bank all the rights and powers of a holder in due course, and does not require the bank to be actually designated a holder in due course. Once the Bank received M's cheques to himself, its liability to its customer was triggered. The Bank was therefore contractually bound to honour its customer's demand to pay him. As such, all of the requirements of s. 224(1) of the ITA were met, and the requirement to pay attached to the money in transit between M's accounts.

== Aftermath ==
The ruling conflicts with established principles governing banking and bills of exchange law in Canada. The minority also noted that the majority's view of a joint account "may negatively impact other areas of the law", which may require amendment of the relevant statutes.

== See also ==
- List of Supreme Court of Canada cases (McLachlin Court)
