= Section 9 of the Canadian Charter of Rights and Freedoms =

Constitutional prohibition on arbitrary detention

Section 9 of the Canadian Charter of Rights and Freedoms, found under the "Legal rights" heading in the Charter, guarantees the right against arbitrary detainment and imprisonment. Section nine states:

9. Everyone has the right not to be arbitrarily detained or imprisoned.

== Interpretation ==
Detainment within the meaning of both section nine and section ten is not invoked unless there is significant physical or psychological restraint. Detainment can be found to be arbitrary where there is "no express or implied criteria which govern its exercise."

The Supreme Court of Canada has stated that "detention" refers to a suspension of an individual's liberty interest by a significant physical or psychological restraint. Psychological detention is established either where the individual has a legal obligation to comply with the restrictive request or demand, or a reasonable person would conclude by reason of the state conduct that he or she had no choice but to comply.

In cases where there is no physical restraint or legal obligation, it may not be clear whether a person has been detained. To determine whether the reasonable person in the individual’s circumstances would conclude that he or she had been deprived by the state of the liberty of choice, the court may consider, inter alia, the following factors:

- The circumstances giving rise to the encounter as would reasonably be perceived by the individual: whether the police were providing general assistance; maintaining general order; making general inquiries regarding a particular occurrence; or, singling out the individual for focused investigation.
- The nature of the police conduct, including the language used; the use of physical contact; the place where the interaction occurred; the presence of others; and the duration of the encounter.
- The particular characteristics or circumstances of the individual where relevant, including age; physical stature; minority status; level of sophistication.

Where section nine has been invoked the Crown must show that the police were acting under a lawful duty arising from either the common law (per the R. v. Waterfield test) or from a statute. Following this, the Crown must show that the conduct itself was a justifiable use of their authority granted under the duty.

=== Traffic stops ===
In R v Grant (1990), it was found that random stops by police, authorized by statute, were in violation of section 9 but were justified as a reasonable limitation under section 1 of the Charter. Likewise, in R. v. Ladouceur (1990) highway stops were found to be arbitrary where absolute discretion was given to the police. Again, the violation was justified under section 1.

=== Investigative detention ===
In R. v. Simpson, the Ontario Court of Appeal found that police could not use their traffic stop powers as a pretext to detain an individual in the context of a criminal investigation. Simpson confirms that the power to detain for investigative purposes can only be exercised where there is "a constellation of objectively discernible facts which give the detaining officer reasonable cause to suspect that the detainee is criminally implicated in the activity under investigation." This test was upheld and expanded upon by the Supreme Court of Canada in R. v. Mann.

=== Security certificates ===
In Charkaoui v. Canada (Citizenship and Immigration), the Supreme Court ruled that the Canada's security certificate regime, which enabled the pretrial detention of those suspected of posing a threat to national security, constituted arbitrary detention within the meaning of Section 9 of the Charter.
