= BMP Global Distribution Inc v Bank of Nova Scotia =

- Supreme Court of Canada

Hearing: May 15, 2008 Judgment: April 2, 2009
- Full case name: B.M.P. Global Distribution Inc. v. Bank of Nova Scotia doing business as the Scotiabank and the said Scotiabank; Bank of Nova Scotia doing business as the Scotiabank and the said Scotiabank v. B.M.P. Global Distribution Inc., 636651 B.C. Ltd., Audie Hashka and Paul Backman
- Citations: 2009 SCC 15; [2009] 1 SCR 504; 304 DLR (4th) 292; [2009] 8 WWR 428; 58 BLR (4th) 1; 94 BCLR (4th) 1
- Docket No.: 31930
- Prior history: Judgment of the British Columbia Court of Appeal, allowing an appeal and dismissing a cross‑appeal from a decision of Supreme Court of British Columbia.
- Ruling: Appeal dismissed and cross‑appeal allowed.

Holding
- If a person pays another due to a mistake of fact that led to the payment, the payor is entitled to recover the money, unless (1) the payor intends that the payee shall have the money at all events or is deemed in law so to intend, (2) the payment is made for good consideration, or (3) the payee has changed his position in good faith or is deemed in law to have done so.

Court membership
- Chief Justice: Beverley McLachlin; Puisne Justices: Michel Bastarache, Ian Binnie, Louis LeBel, Marie Deschamps, Morris Fish, Rosalie Abella, Louise Charron, Marshall Rothstein

Reasons given
- Unanimous reasons by: Deschamps J.
- Bastarache, Fish, Abella, and Charron JJ. took no part in the consideration or decision of the case.

Laws applied
- Bills of Exchange Act

BMP Global Distribution Inc v Bank of Nova Scotia [2009] 1 S.C.R. 504, 2009 SCC 15, is a significant case of the Supreme Court of Canada on the law of restitution and tracing, in this case dealing with a bank's right to recover funds paid by mistake on the deposit of a fraudulent cheque.

== The courts below ==
In the original case before the British Columbia Supreme Court, the trial judge ordered BNS to pay $777,336 in total pecuniary damages and also awarded damages for wrongful disclosure of information and defamation. In his view, BNS had violated the service agreement as well as the law applicable to banker/customer relations by charging back amounts credited to BMP's and the related accounts.

On appeal to the British Columbia Court of Appeal, BNS's appeal was allowed against BMP by reducing the latter's damages to $101. As to the funds traced in the related accounts, the court found that BMP's transfers were proper and that the cheques were actual bills of exchange and dismissed the appeals against BMP's related parties.

== Appeal to the Supreme Court ==
In a unanimous judgment, BMP's appeal was dismissed, and BNS' cross-appeal was allowed.

=== The right to recover funds ===
As noted in Barclays Bank v. Simms, if a person pays money to another under a mistake of fact which causes him to make the payment, he or she is prima facie entitled to recover it. The person's claim may fail, however, if:

1. the payor intends that the payee shall have the money at all events or is deemed in law so to intend (the principle of "finality of payment");
2. the payment is made for good consideration; or
3. the payee has changed his position in good faith or is deemed in law to have done so.

In that regard, BMP had raised the following points in its defence:

- on finality of payment:
  - it forms part of the common law and that it prevents the drawee bank from recovering the paid proceeds of a forged cheque from anyone other than the forger
  - the scheme of the Bills of Exchange Act does not allow RBC to recover from BNS or BMP
  - the service agreement between BNS and BMP precludes BNS from recovering such proceeds from BMP
- on good consideration:
  - RBC should bear the loss
- on the payee's (i.e., BNS) change of position:
  - BNS's role was changed from that of a collecting bank to that of a borrower

Here, RBC had a right to recover the money paid to BMP. RBC's payment was made on the basis of a forged cheque and the defences are not available to BMP in the circumstances of this case.

=== The principles of tracing ===
BNS had the right to claim the amount in BMP's account and to trace funds in the related accounts. There is no issue of identification of the money in BMP's account.

It is possible at common law to trace funds into bank accounts if it is possible to identify the funds. When the chain is broken by one of the intervening parties paying from its own funds, identification of the claimant's funds is no longer possible. However, the fact that a cheque passes through a clearing system, or that it may have been certified, does not break the chain, as the funds have not lost their identity. Tracing is impossible only when the means of ascertainment fail. As noted by the Court,

It makes no difference in reason or law into what other form, different from the original, the change may have been made, whether it be into that of promissory notes for the security of the money which was produced by the sale of the goods of the principal... or into other merchandize... for the product of or substitute for the original thing still follows the nature of the thing itself, as long as it can be ascertained to be such, and the right only ceases when the means of ascertainment fail, which is the case when the subject is turned into money, and mixed and confounded in a general mass of the same description. The difficulty which arises in such a case is a difficulty of fact and not of law, and the dictum that money has no ear‑mark must be understood in the same way; i.e. as predicated only of an undivided and undistinguishable mass of current money.

== Aftermath ==
The decision has given Canadian financial institutions some protection in the event of the deposit of counterfeit cheques. The Court, however, in Canada Trustco Mortgage Co. v. Canada, decided not to extend its principles to other types of fraudulent payments, although the dissenting opinion in that case endorsed the approach.

== See also ==
- List of Supreme Court of Canada cases (McLachlin Court)
