= Brad Harrison =

American venture capitalist (born 1972)

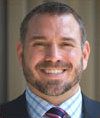
- Born: Bradley C. Harrison; March 11, 1972 (age 54)
- Education: United States Military Academy at West Point; MIT Sloan School of Management
- Occupations: Venture capitalist Founder of Scout Ventures
- Website: https://www.scout.vc/

Bradley C. Harrison (born March 11, 1972) is a venture capitalist. He is the founder and managing partner of Scout Ventures, a venture capital firm that offers entrepreneurs support and capital.

== Early life and education ==
Harrison attended the United States Military Academy at West Point from 1990 to 1994 where he graduated as a Distinguished Honor Graduate with a B.S. in theoretical economics.

Harrison then attended the MIT Sloan School of Management from 1999 to 2001 where he graduated with an MBA.

== Career ==
Harrison was an Airborne Ranger and served in the U.S. Army for 5 years where he became a captain.

Harrison founded Gladiator Group, a venture consulting firm, and also served as a Director at America Online where he was responsible for strategy, business development, and new revenue creation.

In 2004, Harrison was Vice President of Strategic Partnerships and Distribution of MeMedia Inc. In 2006, he founded his own venture firm, Brad Harrison Ventures. As an evolution of BHV, he launched the BHV Entrepreneurship Fund II to focus on early-stage venture capital. The Entrepreneurship Fund is focused on providing strategic capital to start-ups and start-overs with a Media, Technology and Entertainment focus. In August 2013, Harrison rebranded BHV to Scout Ventures. Previous investments include Social Weekend.

As of 2024, Harrison is a managing partner of Scout Ventures, out of Austin, Texas.
