= R v Collins (1987) =

- Supreme Court of Canada

Hearing: May 27, 1986 Judgment: April 9, 1987
- Full case name: Ruby Collins v. Her Majesty The Queen
- Citations: [1987] 1 S.C.R. 265
- Docket No.: 17937
- Prior history: Judgment for the Crown in the Court of Appeal for British Columbia.
- Ruling: appeal allowed, new trial ordered

Holding
- (1) A search or seizure will be unreasonable under s. 8 of the Charter unless it is authorized by law, the authorizing law is reasonable, and the search is carried out in a reasonable manner. (2) Evidence obtained in violation of Charter rights threatens to bring the administration of justice in disrepute if it is a more serious violation and if it affects the fairness of the trial. (4:1)

Court membership
- Chief Justice: Brian Dickson; Puisne Justices: Jean Beetz, Willard Estey, William McIntyre, Julien Chouinard, Antonio Lamer, Bertha Wilson, Gerald Le Dain, Gérard La Forest

Reasons given
- Majority: Lamer J. (paras. 1-46), joined by Dickson, Wilson, La Forest JJ.
- Concurrence: Le Dain J.(para. 53)
- Dissent: McIntyre J. (paras. 47-52)
- Superseded by
- R. v. Grant (on s. 24(2) of the Charter only)

R v Collins [1987] 1 S.C.R. 265 1987 SCC 11 is a decision of the Supreme Court of Canada on section 8 and was a leading case on section 24(2) of the Constitution Act, 1982 which allowed for the exclusion of evidence upon infringing the Charter. The Collins test for section 24(2) was developed for determining if the administration of justice was brought into disrepute by the inclusion of the evidence. The test was later replaced in R. v. Grant.

== Background ==
The Royal Canadian Mounted Police Drug Squad in Vancouver had Ruby Collins under surveillance as part of an investigation into a "heroin problem". One of the officers approached her in a local pub, told her that he was a police officer, and then grabbed her by the throat and in the process dragged her down to the floor in what is known as a "throat hold" used to prevent suspects from swallowing drug filled balloons. The officer then told her to let go of a heroin filled balloon she had in her hand, and she did so. The officer then arrested Collins for drug possession.

At the voir dire, Crown counsel sought to justify the search under what was then section 10 of the Narcotics Control Act (NCA). The search power in s. 10 required the officer to "reasonably believe" there is an illegal narcotic in a place. In order to establish the officer's reasonable belief, Crown counsel asked the officer when he began to suspect that Ruby Collins was in possession of heroin. The officer began to respond: "We were advised..." but defence counsel objected with an interruption, arguing that whatever the officer had been told by a third party was hearsay. (In fact, as Lamer J. notes, the fact was not hearsay and the trial judge should have been overruled.) In this way, the grounds for the officer's belief that Ruby Collins possessed heroin was never established at trial, and the trial judge concluded that, since the requirements of s. 10 were not met, the search was illegal.

== Reasons of the court ==
The majority judgment was given by Lamer J.

=== Section 8 ===
Lamer began by examining if the search violated Collins rights under section 8 that protects individuals against unreasonable search and seizure. A search can only be reasonable, Lamer held, if it met three requirements:

1. the search must be authorized by law;
2. the law itself must be reasonable;
3. the manner in which the search is carried out must be reasonable.

In this way, the Supreme Court disagreed with some lower courts, and some American jurisprudence, in holding that an illegal search was automatically unreasonable.

Lamer J. concluded that, since the Crown had not established that the search had met the requirements of section 10 of the Narcotics Control Act, it was not authorized by law. Therefore, it failed the first prong of the three-part test and was an unreasonable search under s. 8 of the Charter.

=== Section 24(2) ===
Once a violation was found, the case turned on the meaning of section 24(2) which said that once a violation of an individual's charter rights have been found, the evidence obtained through the violation must be excluded if its inclusion would bring the administration of justice into disrepute.

Lamer examined the meaning of "disrepute". He rejected the previous use of the term established in Rothman v. The Queen [1981] 1 S.C.R. 640 which suggested evidence should be excluded on grounds that it would "shock" the community. Instead, he stated, the standard should be lower. He does not give a clear definition of "disrepute" but instead gives a set of three weighted factors to determine if there has been disrepute. The factors consist of:

1. factors affecting the fairness of the trial,
2. factors relevant to the seriousness of the violation; and
3. factors relevant to the effect of excluding the evidence.

The method of analyzing the first set of factors was presented in R. v. Stillman which produced the "Stillman test". This analysis includes looking at the nature of the evidence and whether there would have been any alternative means of obtaining the evidence.

The second point of analysis examines whether admission of the evidence would implicitly condone the illegal practices of the police. The courts focus on the manner in which the evidence was obtained. This includes factors such as whether it was done in good faith. Namely, was it inadvertent, merely technical, or whether it was deliberate or wilful. As well, the courts can consider whether there was any exigent circumstances, urgency, or necessity in the act.

The third set of factors look at the effect of the exclusion on the repute of the administration of justice. The effect of the admission must be weighed against its exclusion. The courts compare the seriousness of the breach and the fairness of the trial against the importance of the evidence in the Crown's case and the overall.

The question under s. 24(2) is whether the system's repute will be better served by the admission or the exclusion of the evidence, and it is thus necessary to consider any disrepute that may result from the exclusion of the evidence. In my view, the administration of justice would be brought into disrepute by the exclusion of evidence essential to substantiate the charge, and thus the acquittal of the accused, because of a trivial breach of the Charter.

== Subsequent decisions ==
In 2009, the Supreme Court of Canada found that courts were having trouble applying the Collins test in s. 24(2) analysis, and replaced it with a completely new test in R. v. Grant.

== See also ==
- List of Supreme Court of Canada cases
