= R v Grant =

- Supreme Court of Canada

Hearing: April 24, 2008 Judgment: July 17, 2009
- Full case name: Donnohue Grant v Her Majesty The Queen
- Citations: 2009 SCC 32, [2009] 2 SCR 353
- Docket No.: 31892
- Prior history: Judgment for the Crown in the Court of Appeal for Ontario.
- Ruling: appeal allowed in part (acquittal allowed on one charge, convictions continued on remaining charges)

Holding
- (1) A detention is defined as suspension of an individual's liberty by significant physical or psychological restraint, with various factors helping to determine whether there was a psychological detention. (5:2) (2) To determine if the admission of evidence obtained by a breach of an accused person's Charter rights would bring the administration of justice into disrepute, courts must consider the seriousness of the Charter-infringing state conduct, the impact of the breach on the Charter-protected rights of the accused, and society's interest in the adjudication of the case on its merits. (6:1) (3) For the purpose of transferring a firearm without lawful authorization under section 100(1) of the Criminal Code, "transfer" requires some type of transaction. (7:0)

Court membership
- Chief Justice: Beverley McLachlin; Puisne Justices: Ian Binnie, Louis LeBel, Marie Deschamps, Morris Fish, Rosalie Abella, Louise Charron, Marshall Rothstein

Reasons given
- Majority: McLachlin CJ and Charron J (paras 1–149), LeBel, Fish, and Abella JJ concurring
- Concurrence: Binnie J (paras 150–184)
- Concurrence: Deschamps J (paras 185–230)
- Rothstein J took no part in the consideration or decision of the case.

R v Grant [2009] S.C.R., 2009 SCC 32 is a leading decision of the Supreme Court of Canada on section 9, section 10 and section 24(2) of the Canadian Charter of Rights and Freedoms ("Charter"). The Court created a number of factors to consider when determining whether a person had been detained for the purpose of sections 9 and 10 of the Charter. The Court also created a new test for determining whether evidence obtained by a Charter breach should be excluded under section 24(2) of the Charter, replacing the Collins test.

== Background ==
Three Toronto police officers were patrolling a school area known for a high crime rate for the purposes of monitoring the area and maintaining a safe student environment. Police observed Donnohue Grant in the area, acting suspiciously. A uniformed police officer went to speak to Mr. Grant, asked him what was going on and asked him for his name and address. Mr. Grant handed over his identification and continued acting nervously. He went to adjust his jacket, prompting the officer to ask Mr. Grant to keep his hands in front of him. Worried about the safety of the first officer, the other two officers arrived, identified themselves, and obstructed Mr. Grant's ability to continue walking forward. A conversation took place with Mr. Grant, at which point he advised police he had marijuana and a firearm on him. Mr. Grant was arrested, and the marijuana and a loaded revolver were seized. Mr. Grant was never informed of his right to speak to a lawyer prior to being arrested.

The trial judge found that Mr. Grant was not detained before his arrest, and that section 9 and section 10 of the Charter were not infringed. The gun was admitted into evidence, and Mr. Grant was convicted of a number of firearm offences, including transferring a firearm without lawful authority (section 100(1) of the Criminal Code).

On appeal, the Court of Appeal for Ontario found that a detention occurred when Mr. Grant began making incriminating statements, and since there were no reasonable grounds to detain Mr. Grant, section 9 of the Charter was infringed. Applying the Collins test, the related Stillman test, and other subsequent jurisprudence, the Court of Appeal found that admission of the firearm would not unduly undermine the fairness of the trial. As a result, they would not have excluded the firearm, and the convictions were not overturned. The Court of Appeal also noted that moving a firearm from one place to another met the definition of "transfer".

== Reasons of the court ==
The majority judgment was given by McLachlin CJ and Charron J.

=== Sections 9 and 10 ===
The majority found that "detention" refers to a suspension of an individual's liberty interest by a significant physical or psychological restraint. Psychological detention is established either when the individual has a legal obligation to comply with the restrictive request or demand or when a reasonable person would conclude by reason of the state's conduct that they had no choice but to comply.

In cases where there is physical restraint or legal obligation, it may not be clear whether a person has been detained. To determine whether a reasonable person in the individual's circumstances would conclude that the state had deprived them of the liberty of choice, the court may consider, inter alia, the following factors:

- The circumstances giving rise to the encounter as would reasonably be perceived by the individual: whether the police were providing general assistance; maintaining general order; making general inquiries regarding a particular occurrence; or, singling out the individual for focused investigation.
- The nature of the police conduct, including the language used; the use of physical contact; the place where the interaction occurred; the presence of others; and the duration of the encounter.
- The particular characteristics or circumstances of the individual, when relevant, including age; physical stature; minority status; level of sophistication.

The majority went on to find that Mr. Grant was psychologically detained when he was told to keep his hands in front of him and when the other officers moved into position to prevent him from walking forward. Therefore, he was arbitrarily detained and denied his right to counsel.

In a concurring decision, Binnie J disagreed with the majority's analysis of the definition of detention but agreed that Mr. Grant was detained before he incriminated himself, infringing his Charter rights. In a second concurring decision, Deschamps J also agreed that Mr. Grant was detained prior to incriminating himself.

=== Section 24(2) ===
Once a violation was found, the case turned on the application of section 24(2), which states that once a violation of an individual's Charter rights have been found, the evidence obtained through the violation must be excluded if its inclusion would bring the administration of justice into disrepute.

The majority found that the analytical framework found in the prior leading cases of R v Collins and R v Stillman had created justifiable criticisms, and the majority set out a revised test, consisting of three parts:

- Seriousness of the Charter-Infringing State Conduct, which requires an assessment of whether the admission of the evidence would bring the administration of justice into disrepute, and focuses on the severity of the state conduct that led to the Charter breach (which includes an analysis of whether the breach was deliberate or willful, and whether the officers were acting in good faith),
- Impact on the Charter-Protected Interests of the Accused, which focuses on how the accused person was affected by the state conduct (which includes an analysis of the intrusiveness into the person's privacy, the direct impact on the right not to be forced to self-incriminate, and the effect on the person's human dignity), and
- Society's Interest in an Adjudication on the Merits, which focuses on how reliable the evidence is in light of the nature of the Charter breach.

After applying all three inquiries into the evidence obtained from Mr. Grant, the majority found that the gun should not be excluded as evidence against Mr. Grant.

Binnie J agreed entirely with the majority's analysis of section 24(2). Deschamps J agreed that the Collins test needed replacing, but disagreed with the majority's proposed test. Nonetheless, she agreed with the majority's ultimate conclusion that the gun should not be excluded as evidence against Mr. Grant.

=== Other matters ===
The majority disagreed with the lower courts' interpretation of "transfer" for the purpose of transferring a firearm without lawful authorization under section 100(1) of the Criminal Code. The majority found that "transfer" in such a context required some type of "transaction". Deschamps J expressly agreed with the majority's analysis. Binnie J did not comment on the issue, other than stating he agreed with the majority's ultimate disposition of the appeal.

== See also ==
- List of Supreme Court of Canada cases (McLachlin Court)
- Criminal law of Canada
- List of Supreme Court of Canada cases
- R v Suberu [2009] SCJ No. 33 - Companion case to R v Grant
- R v Harrison [2009] SCJ No. 34 - Companion case to R v Grant
- Overview of Supreme Court of Canada consideration of Grant and subsequent decisions applying s. 24(2) of the Charter of Rights - Hon. Gerard Mitchell, Ret'd Chief Justice of PEI
