= Section 8 of the Canadian Charter of Rights and Freedoms =

Constitutional bar on unreasonable searches

Section 8 of the Canadian Charter of Rights and Freedoms protects against unreasonable search and seizure. This right provides those in Canada with their primary source of constitutionally enforced privacy rights against unreasonable intrusion from the state. Typically, this protects personal information that can be obtained through searching someone in pat-down, entering someone's property or surveillance.

Under the heading of legal rights, section 8 states:

8. Everyone has the right to be secure against unreasonable search or seizure.

Any property found or seized by means of a violation of section 8 can be excluded as evidence in a trial under section 24(2).

== Reasonable expectation of privacy ==
Section 8 does not apply to every search or seizure. Rather, the right focuses on the action being unreasonable on the basis that it violates the expectation of privacy that a reasonable individual would have.

=== Examples ===
The driver of a motor vehicle normally has a reasonable expectation in the contents of that vehicle, although that same expectation does not necessarily extend to the passenger of a vehicle who is not the owner.

Likewise, a visitor to a dwelling house does not enjoy the same expectation of privacy as a permanent occupant.

A reasonable expectation of privacy generally exists in a hotel room, although the expectation of privacy in a hotel room diminishes in circumstances where the occupant indiscriminately invites members of the public inside.

Information which does not "tend to reveal intimate details of the lifestyle and personal choices of the individual" is usually not subject to a reasonable expectation of privacy. For this reason, utility records are generally not subject to an expectation of privacy, nor are heat patterns which can be detected from outside a private building. Garbage placed at the curb for pickup is considered in law to be abandoned, and therefore fails to engage a reasonable privacy interest.

In R. v. TELUS Communications Co., the Supreme Court of Canada found that the reasonable expectation of privacy protected by Section 8 of the Charter of Rights and Freedoms applies to modern communications technologies such as text messages, even if the data in question is located on a third-party server.

== Search ==
Not every form of examination constitutes search. A search within the meaning of section eight is determined by whether the investigatory technique used by the state diminishes a person's reasonable expectation of privacy. The focus of analysis is upon the purpose of the examination. A police officer who compels someone to produce their licence would not be invasive enough to constitute a search (R. v. Ladouceur, [1990]). Equally, an inspection of the inside of a car is not a search, but questions about the contents of a bag would be. (R. v. Mellenthin [1992]) It has also been ruled that the use of a police dog as a means to gain probable cause to search is also in itself a violation of section 8, and that other factors must be present before a police dog can be used and a search executed. (R. v. A.M. [2008], R. v. Kang-Brown [2008])

In R. v. Feeney, the Supreme Court found that the entry into a private home without a warrant constitutes a violation of Section 8.

The use of wiretapping technology is also considered a "search" for the purpose of Section 8. Warrantless wiretapping can sometimes be justified under section 1 of the Charter of Rights and Freedoms in cases where exigent circumstances exist; however the Supreme Court found in R. v. Tse, 2012 SCC 16 that when police use such tactics, they must promptly notify the individual whose reasonable expectation of privacy has been infringed.

The application of section 8 is not limited to the criminal context, and has become an issue in civil forfeiture litigation, with some courts holding that "exactly the same Charter principles apply to the manner in which that evidence is obtained as would be applicable in a criminal case".

In R v Fearon (2014), the Supreme Court held in a 4–3 ruling that police search of a cell phone without a warrant during an arrest does not violate the Charter. However, the Court ruled that police must follow several search guidelines.

== Seizure ==
The meaning of seizure is fairly straightforward. In R. v. Dyment (1988), the Supreme Court defined it simply as the "taking of a thing from a person by a public authority without that person's consent." This meaning has been narrowed to cover property taken in furtherance of administration or criminal investigation (Quebec (Attorney General) v. Laroche, [2002]).

== See also ==
- Fourth Amendment to the United States Constitution
