= Alberta v Hutterian Brethren of Wilson Colony =

- Supreme Court of Canada

Hearing: October 7, 2008 Judgment: July 24, 2009
- Full case name: Her Majesty the Queen in Right of Alberta v. Hutterian Brethren of Wilson Colony and Hutterian Brethren Church of Wilson
- Citations: 2009 SCC 37, [2009] 2 SCR 567
- Docket No.: 32186
- Prior history: Judgement for the Hutterian Brethren at the Alberta Court of Appeal
- Ruling: Appeal allowed.

Holding
- Mandatory driver's license photographs violates the religious freedom guarantee of section 2(a) the Canadian Charter of Rights and Freedoms, but this infringement is saved under section 1 due to the need to prevent identity fraud.

Court membership
- Chief Justice: Beverley McLachlin; Puisne Justices: Ian Binnie, Louis LeBel, Marie Deschamps, Morris Fish, Rosalie Abella, Louise Charron, Marshall Rothstein

Reasons given
- Majority: McLachlin CJ (paras 1–109), joined by Binnie, Deschamps and Rothstein JJ
- Dissent: Abella J. (paras 110–177)
- Dissent: Lebel J. (paras 178–202)
- Dissent: Fish J. (para 203)
- Charron J took no part in the consideration or decision of the case.

Laws applied
- R v Oakes,

Alberta v Hutterian Brethren of Wilson Colony [2009] 2 S.C.R. 567, 2009 SCC 37 is a freedom of religion decision by the Supreme Court of Canada. The court addressed whether a requirement that all licensed drivers be photographed unconstitutionally violated the Hutterites' right to freedom of religion.

== Background ==
The Hutterites believe that they cannot consent to being photographed. Previously, an exception had been made from the photograph requirement by the Alberta government. However, the government now keeps the photographs in a large database to prevent identity theft, and ended the exemption. Alberta claimed that making a constitutional exception for the Hutterites would undermine its attempts to prevent such fraud.

The Alberta Court of Appeal found for the Hutterites.

== Opinion of the Court ==
The Alberta government conceded that this was a violation of the Hutterites' religious freedom protected under section 2 of the Canadian Charter of Rights and Freedoms, but argued this violation was allowable under section 1's "reasonable limits" on Charter rights. The Hutterites maintained that this was an unreasonable limit.

Chief Justice McLachlin, writing for the majority, found the law constitutional. She found that the government's need to fight fraud was pressing, and that driving was not a right, so the government was entitled to attach legitimate conditions to it.

Three justices dissented and would have not required the Hutterites to be photographed to be licensed. In three separate opinions, Justices Abella, LeBel and Fish found that this policy was not minimally impairing, since it would not significantly enable identity theft to allow the exceptions, and it would have a large detrimental effect on the Hutterites' way of life, since they would have to employ outsiders to perform all their necessary driving.

== See also ==
- List of Supreme Court of Canada cases (McLachlin Court)
