= Section 24 of the Canadian Charter of Rights and Freedoms =

Remedies for constitutional infringements

Section 24 of the Canadian Charter of Rights and Freedoms provides for remedies available to those whose Charter rights are shown to be violated. Some scholars have argued that it was actually section 24 that ensured that the Charter would not have the primary flaw of the 1960 Canadian Bill of Rights. Canadian judges would be reassured that they could indeed strike down statutes on the basis that they contradicted a bill of rights.

== Text ==
Under the heading "Enforcement," the section states:

24(1) Anyone whose rights or freedoms, as guaranteed by this Charter, have been infringed or denied may apply to a court of competent jurisdiction to obtain such remedy as the court considers appropriate and just in the circumstances.
(2) Where, in proceedings under subsection (1), a court concludes that evidence was obtained in a manner that infringed or denied any rights or freedoms guaranteed by this Charter, the evidence shall be excluded if it is established that, having regard to all the circumstances, the admission of it in the proceedings would bring the administration of justice into disrepute.

== Remedies ==
Subsection 24(1) must be distinguished from subsection 52(1) of the Constitution Act, 1982. Whereas section 52 allows the courts to invalidate laws or parts of laws for breaches of the constitution (including the Charter), section 24 has broader capabilities (hindered only by the "appropriate and just" requirement) and can only be invoked when a claimant's rights are violated. Among other things, section 24 seems to give judges the power to place positive obligations upon a government, as well as to enforce more imaginative remedies.

An example of an imaginative remedy can be found in the landmark case Doucet-Boudreau, (2003) 3 S.C.R. 3, as the claimants challenged the Nova Scotia government's delay in building French language schools as a breach of their section 23 rights. A lower-court judge had ruled in the claimants' favour, and then demanded the government report to him as construction progressed. Despite the Supreme Court minority's objections that this use of section 24 violated "fundamental justice" and the "functus officio" rule, in which a judge makes a ruling and afterwards has no role to play, the majority upheld the earlier decision. As the majority argued, section 24 is "responsive to the needs of a given case," and as such "novel remedies" may not only be permissible, but also required. The "appropriate and just" limit was defined in this case as giving the courts themselves the right to determine what is appropriate and just (although they should keep in mind traditional common law limits on judicial power; in this case it was denied that functus officio was violated), and also as requiring courts to remember that section 24 is itself a part of the constitution and allows judges to carry out their function of enforcing rights.

=== Courts of competent jurisdiction ===
These section 24(1) remedies may only be dispensed by a "court of competent jurisdiction". In R. v. Rahey (1987), it was found that in any case, provincial superior and appellate courts, and courts created by the federal government, will qualify as a court of competent jurisdiction and may award remedies where it is considered "appropriate and just". An inferior provincial court may qualify as a court of competent jurisdiction where the remedy sought relates to trial procedure.

An administrative tribunal may qualify as a court of competent jurisdiction where it has been granted statutory jurisdiction over the parties, subject matter, and remedy sought. The jurisdiction over "remedy sought" means the jurisdiction as granted by statute, irrespective of the total remedies available under section 24(1) that may be applied by other courts. Even where a tribunal is not found to be a court of competent jurisdiction it is still nonetheless capable of applying the Charter. Where a tribunal has been given the power to decide questions of law it must conform to the Constitution in all of its application of law and so invalid laws must be treated as having no force or effect. However, even if the tribunal is a court of competent jurisdiction it cannot make a declaration of invalidity for any invalid law, it can only treat it as no force or effect.

Overall, section 24's "competent jurisdiction" limit on which courts may award remedies, in R. v. 974649 Ontario Inc. (2001), was taken as meaning that while Charter rights are generous, they exist within a framework set up by Parliament and the provincial governments. These elected governments have the authority to grant varying degrees of powers to courts and tribunals, and deference should be shown to the governments' decisions. Reviewing courts may, however, have to exercise interpretation regarding whether lower courts have powers to award certain remedies if it is not explicit in the laws. This involves examining whether the lower court can consider Charter arguments and if allowing the lower court to dispense section 24(1) remedies would disrupt its general operations or be too much of a work burden for the court staff.

== Exclusion of evidence ==
Practices regarding what evidence may be brought against an individual in trials are addressed by section 24(2). When evidence is obtained through the violation of a Charter right, the claimant is able to apply to have the evidence excluded from the trial under this section.

At common law, all evidence, regardless of how it was obtained, can be submitted in a trial. The US exclusionary rule excludes all evidence acquired through the violation of the Bill of Rights. Canada has taken a middle ground, sometimes allowing for the exclusion of evidence, whenever its use threatens to bring the "administration of justice" into "disrepute."

In the 2009 case R. v. Grant, the Supreme Court of Canada created a new test to determine when the administration of justice has been brought into disrepute (replacing the 1987 test in R. v. Collins). The Grant test lists three factors the courts must consider: (1) the seriousness of the Charter-infringing conduct (focusing on a review of how society would view the actions of the state), (2) the impact of the breach on the Charter-protected interests of the accused (focusing on a review of how the state's actions affected the accused), and (3) society's interests in the adjudication of the case on its merits (focusing on a review of the importance and reliability of the evidence).

=== Past interpretations ===
The 1987 case R. v. Collins had established three factors to consider when determining whether to exclude evidence. First, the courts would look at whether the admission of the evidence would affect the fairness of the trial. Second, they would look at the seriousness of the Charter violation, and third, they would look at the effect of excluding the evidence on the administration of justice. Typically, evidence obtained through violating an accused's right to have counsel (section 10(b)) or the right to security from unreasonable search and seizure (section 8) was excluded by this section.

After Collins and other such decisions, by 2000 the Supreme Court of Canada had used the Charter to exclude evidence in 45% of section 24(2) cases that come before the Court.
