= Section 10 of the Canadian Charter of Rights and Freedoms =

Constitutional rights on arrest or detention

Section 10 of the Canadian Charter of Rights and Freedoms specifies rights upon arrest or detention, including the rights to consult a lawyer and the right to habeas corpus. As a part of a broader range of legal rights guaranteed by the Charter, section 10 rights may be limited by the Oakes test and/or the notwithstanding clause. However, section 10 has also spawned considerable litigation, and has made an impact in numerous cases.

== Text ==
The section reads:

10. Everyone has the right on arrest or detention

a) to be informed promptly of the reasons therefor;
b) to retain and instruct counsel without delay and to be informed of that right; and
c) to have the validity of the detention determined by way of habeas corpus and to be released if the detention is not lawful.

== Detention ==
Section 10 is only triggered if a person is arrested or detained. In R v Grant, the Supreme Court stated that "detention" refers to a suspension of an individual's liberty interest by a significant physical or psychological restraint. Psychological detention is established either where the individual has a legal obligation to comply with the restrictive request or demand, or a reasonable person would conclude from the state conduct that there was no choice but to comply.

In cases without physical restraint or legal obligation, it may not be clear whether a person has been detained. To determine whether a reasonable person in the individual's circumstances would conclude they had been deprived by the state of the liberty of choice, the court may consider, inter alia, the following factors:

- The circumstances giving rise to the encounter as would reasonably be perceived by the individual: whether the police were providing general assistance; maintaining general order; making general inquiries regarding a particular occurrence; or, singling out the individual for focussed investigation.
- The nature of the police conduct, including the language used; the use of physical contact; the place where the interaction occurred; the presence of others; and the duration of the encounter.
- The particular characteristics or circumstances of the individual where relevant, including age; physical stature; minority status; level of sophistication.

== Explanation of arrest or detention ==
Section 10(a) requires that a person who is arrested or detained must be told why. In R. v. Latimer (1997), the Supreme Court of Canada considered an argument in which a person, Robert Latimer, was told he was being "detained", but was not told he was being "arrested" and could be charged with the murder of his daughter. The Court found section 10(a) was not infringed. Section 10(a) is meant to ensure those arrested or detained are aware of the gravity of the situation. Latimer argued that since the police did not call the detention an arrest, he was not fully aware of the severity of the trouble he was in. He also claimed this was the reason why he had declined to talk to a lawyer. The Court argued the words used did not matter, but rather how the suspect can interpret the situation. Latimer could be expected to understand the seriousness of the situation since he was told he was being detained in connection with his daughter's death. The police had explicitly said the situation was serious, and had told him of rights one has when being arrested.

== Counsel ==
The right to consult a lawyer is considered to be important, and the courts have been understanding if, even in cases in which the person arrested or detained preferred not to see any lawyer, it is later argued section 10 is violated because the arrested or detained person did not know any better. This applies, for example, to cases in which the arrested or detained person has a low IQ.

Section 10 has also been held not only to guarantee the right to see a lawyer, but also a right to be told that one may see a lawyer, a right to legal aid, and a right to be told that one may seek legal aid. Although the right to counsel itself could be found in the 1960 Canadian Bill of Rights, the right to be told that one may see counsel is new to Canadian bills of rights. Indeed, in the Bill of Rights case Hogan v. The Queen (1978), the Supreme Court found the right to be told that one may see a lawyer did not exist even in a penumbra of the Bill of Rights. "In effect," Professors F.L. Morton and Rainer Knopff write, "section 10(b) of the Charter overrules Hogan."

In R. v. Bartle (1994) the Supreme Court ruled that rights to be informed that one may seek counsel included rights to be told of duty counsel and how to obtain it (e.g., through a free telephone call).
