= List of court cases involving the British Columbia Civil Liberties Association =

The British Columbia Civil Liberties Association has been involved in the following legal cases, either as an intervenor, applicant, or plaintiff. For the year ending December 31, 2016, the association had 30 active court cases and interventions that relied on the assistance of 49 pro bono counsel.

== Supreme Court of Canada ==
- A.B. v. Bragg Communications Inc., 2012 SCC 46
- Agraira v. Canada (Public Safety and Emergency Preparedness), 2013 SCC 36
- Alberta (Information and Privacy Commissioner) v. United Food and Commercial Workers, Local 401, 2013 SCC 62
- Babcock v. Canada (Attorney General), 2002 SCC 57
- BC Freedom of Information and Privacy Association v. Attorney General of British Columbia, 2017 SCC 6
- Canada (Attorney General) v. Bedford, 2013 SCC 72
- Canada (Attorney General) v. Downtown Eastside Sex Workers United Against Violence Society, 2012 SCC 45
- Canada (Attorney General) v. PHS Community Services Society, 2011 SCC 44
- Canada (Attorney General) v. Whaling, 2014 SCC 20
- Canada (Justice) v. Khadr, 2008 SCC 28
- Canadian Broadcasting Corp. v. Canada (Attorney General), 2011 SCC 2
- Canadian Broadcasting Corp. v. The Queen, 2011 SCC 3
- Carter v. Canada (Attorney General), 2015 SCC 5
- Chamberlain v. Surrey School District No. 36, 2002 SCC 86
- Chatterjee v. Ontario (Attorney General), 2009 SCC 19
- Crookes v. Newton, 2011 SCC 47
- Divito v. Canada (Public Safety and Emergency Preparedness), 2013 SCC 47
- Editions Ecosociete Inc. v. Banro Corp., 2012 SCC 18
- Ernst v. Alberta Energy Regulator, 2017 SCC 1
- Ewert v. Canada, 2018 SCC 30
- Frank v. Canada (Attorney General), 2019 SCC 1
- Goodwin v. British Columbia (Superintendent of Motor Vehicles), 2015 SCC 46
- Google Inc. v. Equustek Solutions Inc., et al., 2017 SCC 34
- Groia v. Law Society of Upper Canada, 2018 SCC 27
- Highwood Congregation of Jehovah’s Witnesses (Judicial Committee) v. Wall, 2018 SCC 26
- Little Sisters Book and Art Emporium v. Canada (Minister of Justice), 2000 SCC 69
- M.M. v. United States of America, 2015 SCC 62
- May v. Ferndale Institution, 2005 SCC 82
- Mission Institution v. Khela, 2014 SCC 24
- Mounted Police Association of Ontario v. Canada (Attorney General), 2015 SCC 1
- Ontario (Public Safety and Security) v. Criminal Lawyers' Association, 2010 SCC 23
- Penner v. Niagara (Regional Police Services Board), 2013 SCC 1 9
- R. v. Anthony-Cook, 2016 SCC 43
- R. v. Appulonappa, 2015 SCC 59
- R. v. Boudreault, 2018 SCC 58
- R. v. Bradshaw, 2017 SCC 35
- R. v. Butler, [1992] 1 S.C.R. 452
- R. v. Carvery, 2014 SCC 27
- R. v. Chehil, 2013 SCC 49
- R. v. Clay, 2003 SCC 75
- R. v. Cornell, 2010 SCC 31
- R. v. Criminal Lawyers' Association of Ontario, 2013 SCC 43
- R. v. Cuerrier, [1998] 2 S.C.R. 371
- R. v. D.C., 2012 SCC 48
- R. v. Davey, 2012 SCC 75
- R. v. Emms, 2012 SCC 74
- R. v. Fearon, 2014 SCC 77
- R. v. Hart, 2014 SCC 52
- R. v. Ipeelee, 2012 SCC 13
- R. v. J.F., 2013 SCC 12
- R. v. Jones, 2017 SCC 60
- R. v. Jordan, 2016 SCC 27
- R. v. K.R.J., 2016 SCC 31
- R. v. Khawaja, 2012 SCC 69
- R. v. Lloyd, 2016 SCC 13
- R. v. Mabior, 2012 SCC 47
- R. v. Marakah, 2017 SCC 59
- R. v. MacKenzie, 2013 SCC 50
- R. v. Malmo-Levine; R. v. Caine, 2003 SCC 74
- R. v. Manning, 2013 SCC 1
- R. v. McCrimmon, 2010 SCC 36
- R. v. National Post, 2010 SCC 16
- R. v. Nur, 2015 SCC 15
- R. v. O.N.E., 2001 SCC 77
- R. v. Paterson, 2017 SCC 15
- R. v. Pham, 2013 SCC 15
- R. v. Safarzadeh-Markhali, 2016 SCC 14
- R. v. Sharpe, 2001 SCC 2
- R. v. Sinclair, 2010 SCC 35
- R. v. Smith, 2015 SCC 34
- R. v. Tse, 2012 SCC 16
- R. v. Vice Media Canada Inc., 2018 SCC 53
- R. v. Vu, 2013 SCC 60
- R. v. Williamson, 2016 SCC 28
- R. v. Willier, 2010 SCC 37
- R. v. Yumnu, 2012 SCC 73
- Reference re Prov. Electoral Boundaries (Sask.), [1991] 2 S.C.R. 158
- Reference re Same-Sex Marriage, 2004 SCC 79
- Saskatchewan Federation of Labour v. Saskatchewan, 2015 SCC 4
- Sauve v. Canada (Chief Electoral Officer), 2002 SCC 68
- Sriskandarajah v. United States of America, 2012 SCC 70
- Tran v. Canada (Public Safety and Emergency Preparedness), 2017 SCC 50
- Trinity Western University v. British Columbia College of Teachers, 2001 SSC 31
- WIC Radio Ltd. v. Simpson, 2008 SCC 40
- Wood v. Schaeffer, 2013 SCC 71
- World Bank Group v. Wallace, 2016 SCC 15

== British Columbia Court of Appeal ==
- British Columbia Civil Liberties Association v. Canada (Attorney General), 2018 BCCA 282
- British Columbia Civil Liberties Association v. Canada (Attorney General), 2019 BCCA 5
- R. v. Small, [1973] 4 W.W.R. 563
- Hoogbruin v. Attorney General of British Columbia, [1986] 2 W.W.R. 700
- Lamb v. Canada (Attorney General), 2018 BCCA 266
- Shewchuk v. Ricard, [1986] 28 D.L.R. (4th) 429
- Kempling v. The British Columbia College of Teachers, [2005] BCCA 327
- Vancouver Aquarium Marine Science Centre v. Charbonneau, 2017 BCCA 395

== Supreme Court of British Columbia ==
- Dybikowski v. Attorney General of British Columbia, [1979] 2 W.W.R. 631
- British Columbia Civil Liberties Association v. Attorney General of British Columbia, [1988] 4 W.W.R. 100
- Dixon v. Attorney General of British Columbia, [1989] 3 BCLR (2d) 231
- Russow and Lambert v. Attorney General of British Columbia, [1989] 4 W.W.R. 186
- Austin v. Personnel Services Branch, Ministry of Municipal Affairs, Recreation and Culture et al., [1990] 66 D.L.R. (4th) 33
- Dr. Dutton v. British Columbia Human Rights Tribunal et al., 2001 BCSC 1256
- City of Vancouver v. Maurice et al., 2002 BCSC 1421
- Canadian Federation of Students - British Columbia Component et al. v. Greater Vancouver Transportation Authority et al., 2006 BCSC 455
- Barker v. Hayes, 2006 BCSC 1217
- Canada (AG) v PHS Community Services Society, 2008 BCSC 661
- Victoria (City) v. Adams, 2008 BCSC 1363
- Arkinstall v. City of Surrey, 2008 BCSC 1419
- British Columbia Civil Liberties Association v. Canada (Attorney General), 2018 BCSC 62

== British Columbia Provincial Court ==
- R. v. British Columbia Civil Liberties Association, 2012 BCPC 406

== British Columbia Human Rights Tribunal ==
- Canadian Jewish Congress v. Doug Collins and the North Shore News, [1997] 23
- Elmasry v. Roger's Publishing, 2008 BCHRT 378

== Federal Court of Appeal ==
- Amnesty International Canada v. Canada (Canadian Forces), 2008 FCA 401
- Schmidt v. Canada (Attorney General), 2018 FCA 55

== Federal Court of Canada ==
- Amnesty International Canada v. Canadian Forces, 2007 FC 1147
- British Columbia Civil Liberties Association v. Canada (Attorney General), 2007 FC 901
- British Columbia Civil Liberties Association v. Canada (Attorney General), 2018 FC 1094
- British Columbia Civil Liberties Association v. Canada (Citizenship and Immigration), 2016 FC 1223
- British Columbia Civil Liberties Association v. Royal Canadian Mounted Police, 2008 FC 49
- Canada (Attorney General) v. Amnesty International Canada, 2009 FC 426
- Canada (Attorney General) v. Amnesty International Canada, 2009 FC 918
- Canada (Human Rights Commission) v. Warman, 2012 FC 1162
- Garrick v. Amnesty International Canada, 2011 FC 1099

== Alberta Court of Appeal ==
- UAlberta Pro-Life v. Governors of the University of Alberta, 2018 ABCA 350

== Ontario Court of Appeal ==
- R. v. Mernagh, 2013 ONCA 67
- R. v. Vice Media Canada Inc., 2017 ONCA 231

== Saskatchewan Court of Queen's Bench ==
- Strom v. Saskatchewan Registered Nurses’ Association, 2017 SKQB 110
- Strom v. Saskatchewan Registered Nurses’ Association, 2017 SKQB 355
