= British Columbia Civil Liberties Association =

Canadian organization

- Formation: 1962; 64 years ago
- Type: Non-government organization
- Headquarters: Vancouver, British Columbia, Canada
- Members: 1000+ members
- President: Hasan Alam
- Executive Director: Liza Hughes
- Policy Director: Meghan McDermott
- Budget: $1.2M (2016)
- Website: bccla.org

The British Columbia Civil Liberties Association (BCCLA) is an autonomous, non-partisan charitable society that seeks to "promote, defend, sustain, and extend civil liberties and human rights." It works towards achieving this purpose through litigation, lobbying, complaint assistance, events, social media, and publications. Founded in 1962, it is Canada's oldest civil liberties association. It is based in Vancouver and is jointly funded by the Law Foundation of British Columbia and by private citizens through donations and memberships.

The BCCLA, through its staff lawyers and pro bono counsel, litigates constitutional issues and commonly appears as an intervenor, applicant, or plaintiff at all levels of Canadian courts, including the Supreme Court of Canada. The association's work is guided by the rights and liberties embodied in such documents as Canada's Charter of Rights and Freedoms, France's Declaration of the Rights of Man and of the Citizen, the United Nations' Universal Declaration of Human Rights and the bills of rights in the United States, Britain, and Canada. The association is unaffiliated with any other organization or political group; however, the association often works cooperatively with other organizations, such as Pivot Legal Society, the John Howard Society, and the Canadian Civil Liberties Association, on common causes.

The BCCLA has been consulted by both the governments of Canada and British Columbia on proposed actions or policies that may give rise to civil liberties or human rights concerns. In the early 1980s, the association was invited to appear before the Special Joint Committee of the Senate and the House of Commons on the Constitution to participate in the public consultations on the proposed Charter of Rights and Freedoms. The association was consulted by the federal government in its creation of the Personal Information Protection and Electronic Documents Act (PIPEDA, 2000) and by British Columbia's government in its creation of the Personal Information Privacy Act (PIPA, 2003).

== Organization ==
=== Leadership ===
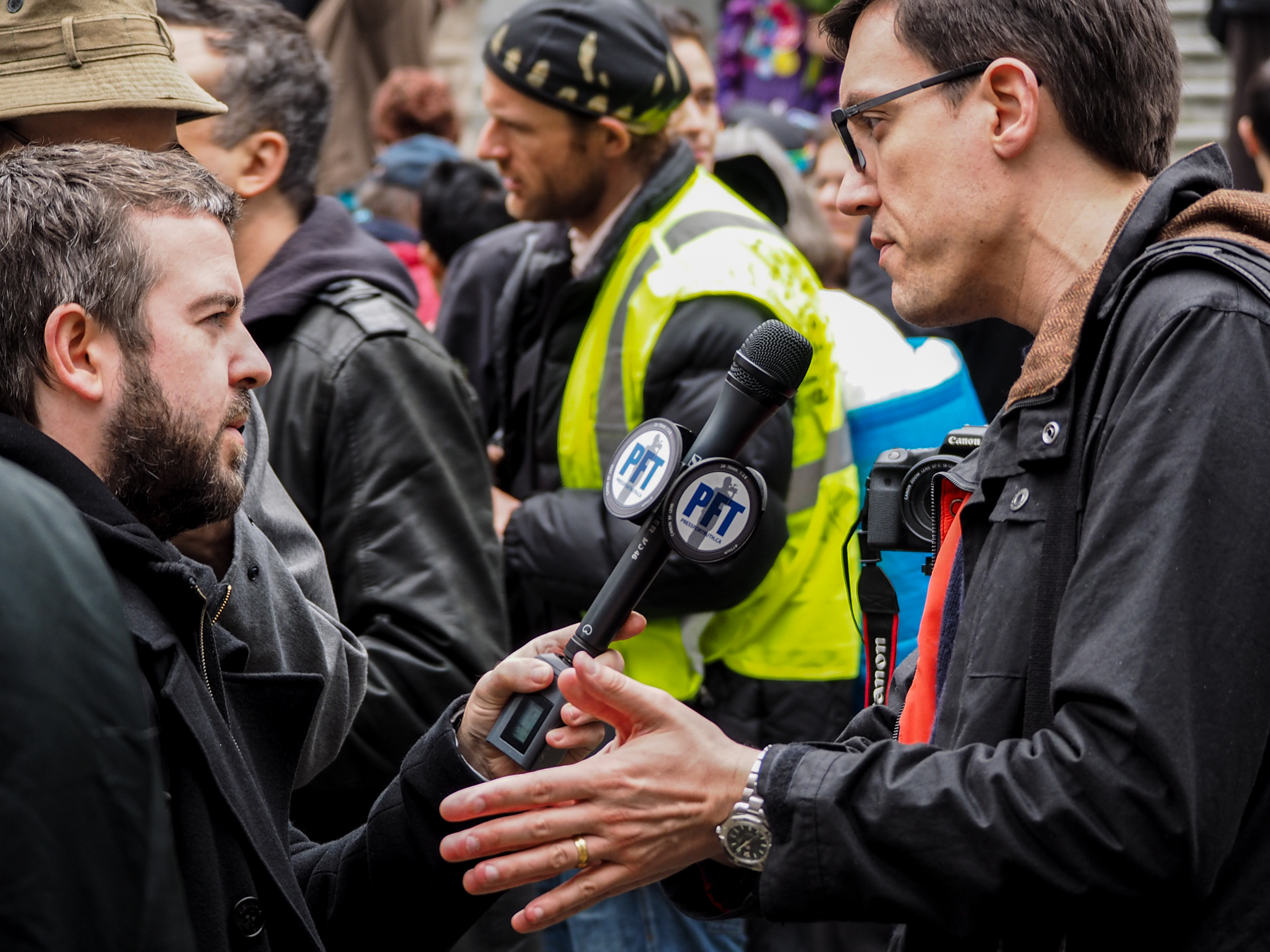
The previous BC Civil Liberties Association Executive Director Joshua Paterson (right) interviewed on the steps of the Vancouver Art Gallery during the Bill C-51 protest on March 14, 2015.

The BCCLA is currently led by Hasan Alam, president, and executive director Liza Hughes. Honorary directors of the board include former prime minister of Canada Kim Campbell, founding president Reverend Phillip Hewett, and environmentalist David Suzuki.

==== Reg Robson ====
Reg Robson (1921–1996) joined the association soon after its founding and served as its main spokesperson, lobbyist, and organizational leader between the mid-1960s and mid-1980s. Robson served in various executive positions, including executive secretary (1969–72, 1978), president (1972–75, 1980–82), and treasurer (1975, 1979). Robson sat on the board of directors into the 1980s and is credited for helping to ensure the viability of the association and its institutional memory.

=== Funding ===
In the year ending December 31, 2016, the BCCLA had a combined revenue of $1.26 million, originating from membership and donations (68%), grants (20%), and other sources, including gaming revenue and litigation recovery (12%). In the year ending December 31, 2016, the expenses of the BCCLA were $1.22 million, attributed to staff salaries and benefits (59%), office operating (12%), litigation costs (9%), and other costs, including rent, professional fees, and travel (20%).

=== Events ===
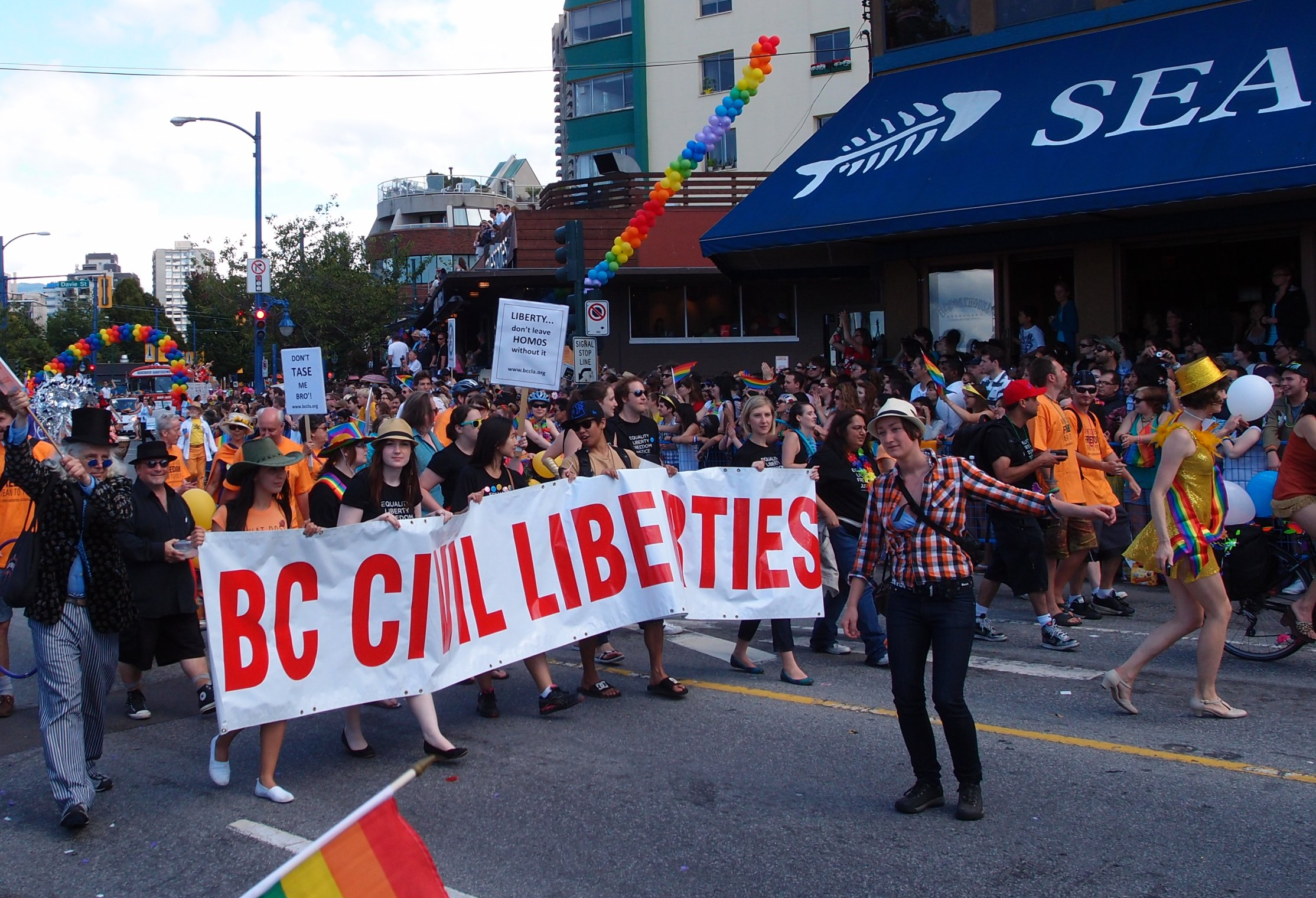
BC Civil Liberties Association at the July 31, 2011 Vancouver Pride Festival

The association organizes forums across British Columbia on a variety of topics, including national security, social justice law reform, HIV disclosure laws, and food rights. It also organizes speaking events, with past speakers including: Jameel Jaffer, Deputy Legal Director at the American Civil Liberties Union; The Right Honourable Beverley McLachlin, Chief Justice of Canada; Michael Ignatieff, Harvard professor and former leader of the Liberal Party of Canada; John Ralston Saul, philosopher, novelist, and essayist; and Maher Arar, a Canadian citizen who was tortured after being deported to Syria by U.S. authorities.

Since 2005, the BCCLA has presented an annual Youth Rights Conference, a daylong seminar for high school students that is intended to promote student activism and civic engagement. Past topics have included gay/straight alliances, homelessness, protest rights, aboriginal justice, and immigrant rights.

=== Awards ===
The association presents an annual Reg Robson Award to honour people who have demonstrated a substantial and long-lasting contribution to civil liberties issues in British Columbia and Canada. Past recipients of the award have included:

- Janine Fuller (inaugural recipient) (1997; advocated against Canada Custom's censorship of LGBT books and magazines)
- Peter and Murray Corren (1998; advocated for LGBT inclusiveness in public schools)
- Joseph Arvay (2005; pro bono counsel for the association in numerous interventions before the Supreme Court of Canada)
- Lieutenant Commander William Kuebler (first non-Canadian recipient) (2009; U.S. Navy appointed counsel for Omar Khadr at Guantanamo Bay)
- Kent Roach and Craig Forcese (2016; raised public awareness of potential civil liberty infringements in bill C-51 [The Anti-terrorism Act, 2015])

In addition to the Reg Robson Award, the association has awarded Liberty Awards in several categories: excellence in legal advocacy (individual, group, and law firm); excellence in journalism; excellence in the arts; excellence in community activism; excellence in youth activism; and, unsung hero.

== History ==
=== 1960s ===
==== Background ====
The events preceding the formation of the BCCLA involved a Kootenays, British Columbia, group known as the Fraternal Council of the Sons of Freedom.

On March 6, 1962, members of this branch of the Sons of Freedom sect used explosives to bring down a 100-metre tower supporting power transmission lines crossing Kootenay Lake to a lead and zinc mine in Kimberley, BC. As a result, over one thousand mine workers were laid off until power to the mining operations could be restored. Civic leaders called on the federal government to respond to the bombing with "drastic action" and the Government of British Columbia offered a $10,000 reward for information leading to the conviction of those responsible. Fearing vigilantism on the part of the miners or others affected by the sect's actions, the RCMP brought in one hundred officers from the Prairies to watch over the tensions.

On March 24, 1962, RCMP officers, on the strength of two confessions of sect members implicating the Sons of Freedom, arrested fifty-seven members of the sect. The members were charged, along with ten other members that were already in custody, with conspiracy to intimidate the Parliament of Canada and the Legislature of British Columbia.

Due to tensions in the Kootenays, the venue for the trial was moved approximately 500 kilometres, from Nelson to New Westminster, BC. The preliminary trial began on June 11, 1962, with Nelson Magistrate William Evans presiding. In court, the two confessions were withdrawn with the members claiming duress. Despite over 98 witness testimonies and the Crown presenting over 500 pages of seized documents as evidence, on August 7, 1962, Magistrate Evans dismissed the Crown's case on the basis that there was insufficient evidence to proceed to trial.

Meanwhile, 104 members of the Son of Freedom, including children, continued to be detained on remand at Mountain Institution in Agassiz, BC.

==== Birth of the association ====
On December 9, 1962, a meeting of 80 people was held in Vancouver at the University of British Columbia in response to the ongoing detention of Sons of Freedom at the Mountain Institution. This would mark the first official meeting of the BCCLA. The association was incorporated under the Societies Act on February 27, 1963.

Under the leadership of Phillip Hewett, a Unitarian minister, a board of directors formed and a committee was struck and a Sons of Freedom defence fund was created to fund litigation and investigation into the Mountain Institution issue. Subsequent to its formation, the BCCLA successfully fought for release of the detainees.

The BCCLA's other activities in the 1960s included aiding in the defence of The Georgia Straight, a Vancouver-based publication, against criminal obscenity charges

=== 1970s ===
==== Gallimaufry Players' obscenity trial ====
On October 27, 1969, a small group of professional actors, directors, and designers known as the Gallimaufry Players began a two-week run of Michael McClure's The Beard at Davie Street's Riverqueen theatre. The play, about an imaginary encounter between Billy the Kid and Jean Harlow, was replete with expletives and ended with a scene of simulated cunnilingus. On November 5, plainclothes members of the Vancouver City Police morality squad attended the performance. The following day, three members of the Gallimaufry Players and the two proprietors of the Riverqueen were criminally charged with presenting an obscene performance. All five defendants were convicted at trial on May 28, 1971, in the Provincial Court of Vancouver and fined a total of $1,250.

The BCCLA launched an immediate appeal at the British Columbia County Court of Vancouver. The appeal was heard over four days in November 1971 by Judge Ladner. The police officers who witnessed the performance testified that expletives were uttered on stage, and that it was impossible to know if the actress was wearing an undergarment during the simulated cunnilingus. The defence presented a series of witnesses, including drama critics from the Vancouver Sun and Vancouver Province newspapers, a drama teacher, a television critic, and an Anglican minister who testified that the words and scenes described by the police officers could not be isolated from the overall context of the play. The judge found the defence witnesses to be "of a certain segment of the community and, while due consideration must and has been given to their evidence, their opinions cannot be accepted as representative of community standards" and that "the standards of decency and measure of tolerance in the Canadian community at this time could not but be offended by the realistic simulation of cunnilingus on the stage." The judge found the evidence insufficient to prove that one of the five defendants, Henry Yeagher, the Gallimaufry's stage manager, was in charge of the production at the time and dismissed the charge against him. The four remaining defendants had their fines set aside in favour of suspended sentences.

The BCCLA launched a further appeal to the British Columbia Court of Appeal. The appeal was heard by Chief Justice Nathaniel Nemetz and Associate Justices Robertson and Branca. Justice Robertson referred to the play as "unsavoury" and noted that "among its 9,000 words it uses 4 'four-letter words' a total of 132 times." Chief Justice Nemetz stated that he "would agree that the last scene would offend many people." Despite their personal views of the play, all three judges ruled in favour of the defendants, quashed the convictions, and ordered a new trial. In his reasons, Chief Justice Nemetz stated that "it is not the personal taste of a judge that determines whether a work is obscene or not" and concluded that Judge Ladner had "misdirected himself" when he "rejected the uncontradicted evidence of all the witnesses for the defence in their totality [and] in doing so he substituted a finding of fact which was unsupported by the evidence." Chief Justice Nemetz ultimately concluded that Judge Ladner should have tested the play against "contemporary standards and to the time, place and circumstances of this performance."

==== Other activities ====
The BCCLA's other activities in the 1970s included:

- The first publication of the Democratic Commitment, the association's biannual newsletter
- Advocating for removal of homosexuality as a grounds of exclusion from Canada from the Immigration Act
- Advocating for the repeal of provisions of the Factories Act that allowed discrimination against women

=== 1980s ===
==== Submissions on the Charter of Rights and Freedoms ====
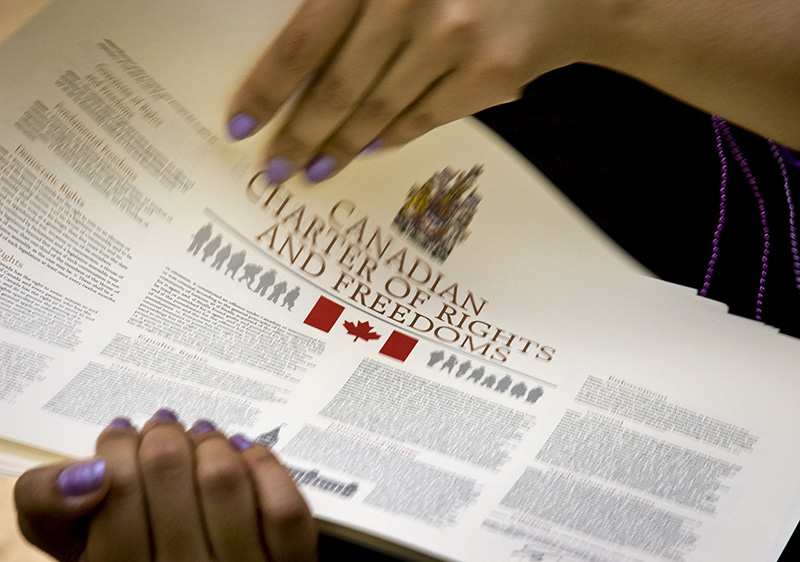
The BCCLA provided written submissions and appeared before the Joint Committee of the Senate and the House of Commons on the Constitution to advocate for several changes before the finalized Charter of Rights and Freedoms was signed into law by Queen Elizabeth II on April 17, 1982.

When the BCCLA learned in 1980 that Prime Minister Pierre Elliot Trudeau's government was planning a series of constitutional reforms that would include the Charter of Rights and Freedoms, the association began submitting comments and recommendations to the Special Joint Committee of the Senate and the House of Commons on the Constitution.

On November 13, 1980, then president Reg Robson submitted an 18-page brief to the joint committee. The letter outlined the association's eagerness to support "entrenchment of a Charter of Rights which would affirm the rights and freedoms that we believe are fundamental for the Canadian people, and which would guide the legislatures and direct the courts of this country to protect and uphold those rights." Subsequent to submitting its written brief, the association was invited to appear before the joint committee.

Despite the association's eagerness for Canadians to have entrenched constitutional rights and freedoms, the association was concerned that the government's public claims about the Charter were misleading and unsupported by the actual wording contained in the government's proposal. The association urged the government to extend the time for public and Parliamentary consideration, and suggested revisions in several areas of the proposed Charter to address these concerns:

- "Illusory protection of fundamental freedoms": The association argued that having a limitation clause in Section 1 that "'guarantees' the rights and freedoms set out in the Charter 'subject to only such reasonable limits as are generally accepted in a free and democratic society'" undermines the very purpose of having entrenched rights and freedoms. The association was particularly concerned with the potential implications that Section 1 could have for minorities, as their rights could be limited to "what is 'reasonable' [and that] is what is 'generally accepted' by the majority". While advocating for the deletion of Section 1, the association acknowledged that emergency powers may be warranted to justify temporary infringements on citizens' rights; however, the association requested further consultation in that regard.
- "Inadequate protection of legal rights": The association was concerned with the wording of the legal rights in sections 7–14 of the draft Charter involving search, seizure, detention, imprisonment, and bail. Each of these rights was worded in a manner that allow it to be limited "on grounds, and in accordance with procedures, established by law." The association's concern was courts would be limited to determining whether the challenged activities, such as a police search, were "established by law" and could not look beyond this to determine whether the law itself was just or constitutional.

In addition to these recommended changes, the association proposed several additions:

- "Search and seizure on reasonable grounds and by warrant only": The association argued against the continued use of writs of assistance — documents that provide police and others with broad powers of entry, search, and seizure, including the power to search any person or place at any time for any reason related to the legislation under which the writ was issued. For example, writs were available under the Narcotics Control Act and the Food and Drug Act. The association argued that writs allowed for the "gross invasion of privacy... on the flimsiest of excuses and the wide potential for their abuse makes them an unjustifiable anachronism in a 'free and democratic society'". Apart from exceptional circumstances, the entry, search, and seizure powers of Section 8, argued the association, should not be exercised without prior judicial authorization in the form of a warrant specifying the person or place, time, and items in question.
- "Arrest on reasonable and probable grounds only": Although the association recognized that Section 7 of the draft Charter, which provided that no one can be deprived of his or her liberty "except in accordance with the principles of fundamental justice" may cover arrest, the association argued that Section 9 of the draft Charter should "include an unambiguous statement that no citizen can be arrested except on reasonable and probable grounds." The association's concern was that without this addition, powers of arrest would rely on judicial interpretation of Section 7 alone, which may lead to different results.
- "The right to remain silent": The association was concerned with the absence of an explicit right of silence in Section 10 (rights of a person upon detention or arrest), Section 11 (rights of a person upon being charged with an offence), or Section 13 (right against self-incrimination for a compelled witness) and argued for its inclusion. The association stated that a right to silence is a cornerstone of a criminal justice system in a society that truly respects the dignity and integrity of citizens: "in order to maintain a fair balance when the might of the state is focused on prosecuting a single individual, the justice system in democratic societies has demanded that the government seeking to punish the individual must produce the evidence against him by its own independent labours, rather than by the simpler, and often cruel expedient of compelling it from his own mouth."
- "The right to counsel": The association argued that Section 10's wording was ambiguous and should be clarified to explicitly recognize a right to counsel for anyone detained or arrested, regardless of whether or not that person has money available to "retain" such counsel.
- "The exclusionary rule": The association argued against Section 26 of the draft Charter that stated "[no] provision of this Charter [except for Section 13] affects the laws respecting the admissibility of evidence in any proceedings or the authority of Parliament of a legislature to make laws in relation thereto." The association argued that rights dealing with search and seizure, the right to silence and right to counsel were not fully meaningful unless the Charter contained a provision to exclude illegally obtained evidence: "prosecutions and convictions for illegal acts should not rest on grounds which are themselves tainted by illegality."
- "Right to a fair hearing": The association pointed out the absence in the draft Charter of "the right of a person to a fair hearing in accordance with the principles of fundamental justice for the determination of his rights and obligations" as was included in prime minister Trudeau's earlier 1969 proposal and in the Canadian Bill of Rights. The association argued for inclusion of such a provision, but with its language changed to explicitly include all instances of decision-making determining rights and obligations, including administrative tribunals, and not just criminal proceedings.

The association identified additional areas of concern with the draft Charter:

- Aboriginal rights: The associated was concerned that the current and future rights of Aboriginals were not adequately protected by the draft Charter. The association pointed to Section 24 which would preserve rights "presently established by law" and noted that it would not protect future rights. The association was also concerned that the draft Charter would preclude the federal government from exercising its powers under section 91(24) of the British North American Act to protect the rights of Aboriginal people, and that the draft Charter may invalidate rights contained in the Indian Act and return jurisdiction of several Aboriginal matters from the federal government to the provinces. The association urged the government to give their submissions, and those made separately by Aboriginal peoples, careful consideration.
- Enforcement and remedies: The association was concerned with how the Charter would be enforced. It noted that the only remedy provided in Section 25 of the draft Charter for violations of the Charter was to declare a law inoperative. The association noted that violations will not only be limited to laws that are inconsistent with the Charter but with the actions of public officers and agencies that are in violation of constitutional rights. The association urged the committee to provide the courts with inherent jurisdiction to provide an adequate remedy for such violations.
- Equality: The association argued that Section 15 of the Charter should not be limited to the traditional grounds of discrimination covered in the draft, and that the section should be expanded to include protect against discrimination based on physical disability, former criminal conviction, and sexual orientation.
- Official languages in courts: The association argued that Section 19 of the draft Charter, which provided for the availability of official languages (i.e. French and English) in courts "established by Parliament" should be extended to "all provincial courts having the same jurisdiction as the B.C. Supreme Court and the B.C. Court of Appeal."
- Right to trial by jury: The association observed that a right to trial by a jury was absent from the draft Charter and argued for its inclusion.
- Amendment procedure: The association noted that the Charter could be amended by referendum pursuant to sections 42 and 50 of the draft proposal and argued against inclusion of these sections stating that "'protecting' minority rights by allowing them to be changed, limited or eliminated by majority in a referendum is no protection whatsoever."

==== Other activities ====
The BCCLA's other activities in the 1980s included:

- Challenging the use of writs of assistance under the Narcotic Control Act which allowed police to enter any dwelling to search for drugs without a warrant
- Challenging the provincial government's attempt to remove abortion from government provided health coverage
- Challenging the provincial Schools Act which required mandatory reading of the Lord's Prayer
- Challenging the British Columbia's provincial electoral boundaries

=== 1990s ===
The BCCLA's activities in the 1990s included:

- Providing the federal government with a legal brief detailing the legislative options regarding assisted suicide
- Publication of "The Privacy Handbook: A Practical Guide to Your Privacy Rights in BC and How to Protect Them" and "The Citizenship Handbook: A Guide to Rights and Responsibilities for New Canadians"
- Challenging the required teaching of the "theory of divine creation" in Abbotsford, BC, schools
- Intervening in the BC College of Teachers refusal to recognize Trinity Western University's teaching certification based on the university's views of homosexuality
- The BCCLA also intervened in several criminal trials, including:
  - R v Cuerrier – a case involving man charged with aggravated assault for having unprotected sex with women while knowing he was HIV-positive
  - R v Sharpe - a case involving child pornography charges for, among other things, possessing private stories and pictures the accused had drawn

=== 2000s ===
The BCCLA's activities in the 2000s included:

- Challenging a New Westminster by-law that banned those convicted of street drug trafficking from sections of the city
- Intervening in Chamberlin et al. v The Board of Trustees of Surrey regarding a school board's refusal to approve three books that portrayed families parented by same-sex couples
- Helping to create the provincial Personal Information and Protection Act (PIPA) to help regulate the collection, use, and disclosure of personal information in the private sector
- Intervening in a Supreme Court of Canada reference regarding same-sex marriage
- Participating in a provincial inquiry into the death of Frank Paul, who died of hypothermia after being left in an alley by police
- Intervening in a US Supreme Court case challenging the continued detention of Canadian child soldier Omar Khadr at Guantanamo Bay, Cuba

=== 2010s ===
==== 2010 Vancouver Winter Olympics legal observer program ====
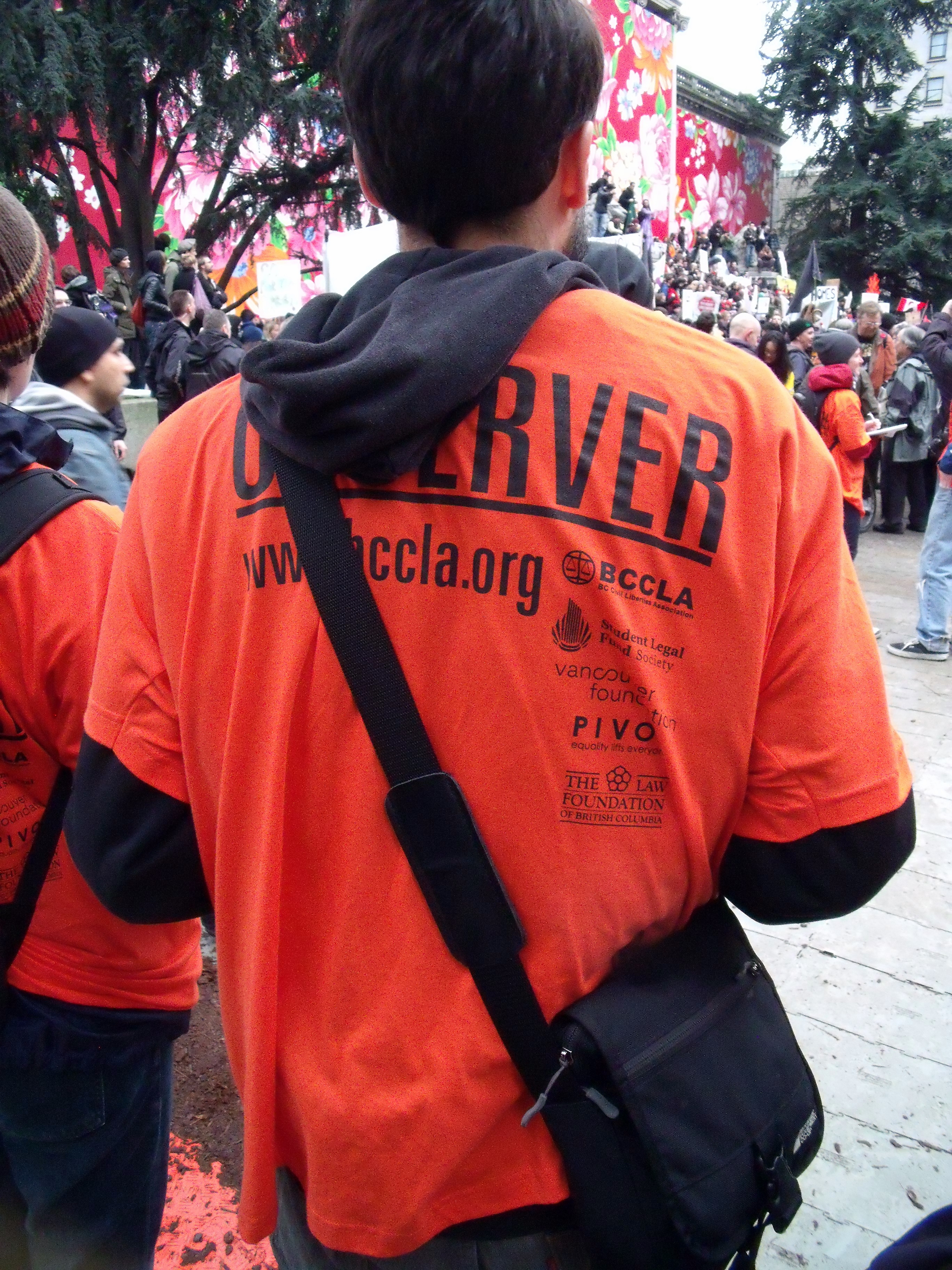
BC Civil Liberties Association legal observers outside Vancouver Art Gallery on February 12, 2010

In September 2009, the BCCLA, in partnership with Pivot Legal Society, announced the creation of its Olympic legal observer program, the first of its kind in Olympic history. The program trained 250 volunteers to observe and record security and police actions at the opening ceremonies and at major demonstrations outside sporting events and in Vancouver's Downtown Eastside during the 2010 Vancouver Winter Olympics. The impetus for the program was a concern that hosting the Olympics would cause Vancouver's homeless citizens to be displaced and free speech and protest rights to be interfered with. Volunteers were instructed to observe police and other security actions in a "neutral and professional manner" and to report possible right violations back to the BCCLA's volunteer lawyers who would then attempt, informally or through court action, to resolve matters. In an effort to familiarize officers with program, the Vancouver Police Department and RCMP Integrated Security Unit agreed to provide legal observer training to senior officers.

After the Opening Ceremonies on February 12, 2010, the BCCLA stated that they were "very pleased with the effective and restrained policing of the demonstrations that [its legal observers] observed prior to and during the Opening Ceremonies" and recorded "very few incidents involving police." On February 23, midway through the games, then BCCLA executive director David Eby stated that "we haven't seen the excesses we worried about." Vancouver Police Department spokesperson Constable Lindsey Houghton commented that the legal observer program helped police maintain public transparency throughout the games.

==== Trinity Western University law school ====
Trinity Western University (TWU), a private religious university, sought the Law Society of British Columbia's permission to start a law school to offer a legal education program prerequisite to bar admission. The Law Society denied permission to the proposed law school based on the TWU's Community Covenant that was mandatory for students to sign as a condition of admission to the school and that among other things, discriminated against LGBTQI+ persons by prohibiting sexual intimacy outside the confines of a marriage between a man and a woman. Initially, BCCLA took the position based on arguments of religious freedom that TWU's proposed law school should not be barred from accreditation. On January 22, 2018, after full and vigorous debate of the issues and principles that extended over a period of months, the BCCLA Board of Directors voted, by a substantial margin, to adopt the position that "the Law Society should not accredit a prerequisite legal education program whose admission and conduct policies discriminate against people based on prohibited grounds, thereby creating a discriminatory barrier around part of the stream of access to the legal profession." On June 15, 2018, The Supreme Court of Canada upheld the decision of the Law Society to deny permission to TWU.

The BCCLA's other activities in the 2010s include:

- Participating in the Braidwood inquiry into the death of Robert Dziekanski, who died after being tasered five times by RCMP officers at Vancouver International Airport
- Challenging the constitutionality of solitary confinement practices in Canada's federal prisons on the basis that the practices are cruel and unusual punishment and discriminatory towards Aboriginal people and those with mental health issues
- Challenging Canada's medically assisted dying laws in Carter v Canada (Attorney General) and opposing the federal government's post-Carter restrictions on assisted dying.
- Challenging current solitary confinement practices in Canadian prisons
- Challenging the legality of the Communications Security Establishment Canada's (CSEC) spying activities against Canadians
- Lobbying for legislation to protect individuals and non-profit organizations from meritless lawsuits by large organizations that are intended to silence freedom of expression

== Publications ==
The BCCLA is an active publisher. It has published its biannual newsletter, The Democratic Commitment, since 1972. The association publishes several handbooks, including: HIV Testing Handbook: A Guide To Your Rights (2014; English); Rights Talk: Students and Civil Liberties at School (2013; English); Electronic Devices: A Guide To Your Rights (2012; English); The Arrest Handbook: A Guide to Your Rights (2002; English, Spanish, Arabic, and Vietnamese); and, The Citizenship Handbook: A Guide to Democratic Rights and Responsibilities (2008; English, Chinese, Punjabi, Vietnamese, and Persian). In 2015, the association marked the passing of its 50th anniversary with the publication of 50 Years of Freedom: A Festschrift Celebration for the Golden Anniversary of the BCCLA, a collection of essays and other writings. It has developed over 200 policy briefs which serve as the cornerstones for its work.

=== Other publications ===
- (2002) The Teaching and Workshop Guide for ESL Teachers and Settlement Counselors
- (2001) Kiddie Porn: Sexual Representation and the Robin Sharpe Case
- (1995) Restricted Entry: Censorship on Trial
- (1994) The Privacy Handbook: A Practical Guide to Your Privacy Rights and How to Protect Them
- (1994) Protecting Rights and Freedoms: Essays on the Charter's Place in Canada's Political, Legal and Intellectual Life
- (1992) Proceedings of the 1992 conference: The Charter: Ten Years After
- (1990) Catastrophic Rights: Experimental Drugs and AIDS
- (1989) The Burden of Office: Agamemnon and Other Losers
- (1989) Liberties

=== Brochures ===
- The Facts About Drug Testing in the Workplace
- Suggestions for Writing a Letter of Complaint to the Police

== Controversy ==
On June 30, 2021, BCCLA Executive Director Harsha Walia retweeted a Twitter news article from Vice News about the burning of Catholic churches in Canada following the discovery of gravesides at former Canadian Indian residential schools, adding the statement, "Burn it all down". In response, Tsimshian entrepreneur and Indigenous relations consultant Chris Sankey called on her to resign while British Columbia's Public Safety Minister Mike Farnworth described her post as "disgusting and reprehensible." Former BCCLA president Craig Jones described Walia's statement as "a new height of stupidity" and called for the withdrawal of financial support from the BCCLA. The Union of British Columbia Indian Chiefs (UBCIC) expressed support for Walia (without mentioning the controversial tweet), describing her as a "highly respected and valued ally."

== See also ==
- List of court cases involving the British Columbia Civil Liberties Association
- Pivot Legal Society
- Egale Canada
- American Civil Liberties Union
- American Civil Rights Union
- Canadian Civil Liberties Association
