= Aggravated sexual assault =

Type of sex crime

The precise definitions of and punishments for aggravated sexual assault and aggravated rape vary by country and by legislature within a country.

== Effects on victims ==
Aggravated sexual assault can lead to short- or long-term effects. Many people who have been sexually assaulted have experienced a continuing effect, of mental or physical nature, or both; such effects may include trauma to the body, emotional trauma, or again, both. Some mental effects include post-traumatic stress, sexual disorders, and depression. Effects to the body include bruising, bleeding from the vaginal area, soreness, and/or a dislocated bone.

=== Post-traumatic stress ===
When people are abused they tend to push aside the memories of the event. The victim may begin to relive the event and experience anxiety. After a person experiences aggravated sexual assault they experience a sense of fear and helplessness. It may also lead to the victim being impaired in a social environment.

=== Sexual disorder ===
Children who have been subject to aggravated sexual assault tend to develop a mental and sexual disorder. A person who has felt powerless as a child may be confused over the differences between affection, sex and abuse.

=== Depression ===
An individual who has been subjected to aggravated sexual assault as a child may experience depression, typically more often and to a greater degree than any other person. Depression is a sense of sadness, and can cause a person to isolate themselves from society, and lose interest in activities they once enjoyed. Symptoms of depression include feeling worthless, hopeless, a change in eating habits, irrational anger or anxiety. Depression can also lead to suicide or thoughts on suicide.

== Laws by country ==
=== Australia ===
Every jurisdiction in Australia has its own legislation for sexual offences, and sexual assault of children is separately defined. There is variation in the terminology and definitions used to describe sexual offences between states and territories; for example, different states and territories define rape, sexual assault, and sexual penetration or intercourse without consent in different ways. It is extremely difficult to obtain a conviction for sexual assault; approximately 85% of sexual assaults never come to the attention of the criminal justice system, and of those offences that are reported, only a small proportion proceed to trial, with an even smaller percentage of these cases resulting in a successful conviction.

==== Queensland ====
In the state of Queensland, the offence of Aggravated Sexual Assault is more serious than that of Sexual Assault, and the sentence may be life imprisonment in the most serious cases. All sexual assault offences are defined by section 352 of the Criminal Code Act 1999 (Qld). There are a number of circumstances that "aggravate" a charge of sexual assault. This includes, amongst others, where there are any of the following elements to the allegation:

- Infliction of an injury on the alleged victim
- Threat of an injury by the accused by use of a weapon or instrument
- The accused acting along with another person
- An alleged victim aged under 16
- Where the alleged victim is "under the authority" of the accused person
- An alleged victim having a serious physical disability
- An alleged victim having a cognitive impairment

=== England and Wales ===
English and Welsh criminal law does not specify a crime of "aggravated sexual assault" but the CPS states: "There may be the presence of aggravating features that make the offence significantly more serious, such as, abuse of position, use of drugs or other substances, use of violence/coercion, use of a weapon in the offence, repeated offending etc."

=== Ireland ===
Aggravated sexual assault has a statutory definition in Irish law, as set out in Section 3 of the Criminal Law (Rape) (Amendment) Act 1990-

"3.—(1) In this Act "aggravated sexual assault" means a sexual assault that involves serious violence or the threat of serious violence or is such as to cause injury, humiliation or degradation of a grave nature to the person assaulted.

(2) A person guilty of aggravated sexual assault shall be liable on conviction on indictment to imprisonment for life.

(3) Aggravated sexual assault shall be a felony."

– irishstatutebook.ie

=== United States ===
In the United States, it is a felony sexual offense governed by laws that vary from state to state. Typically, it is "a sexual assault that maims, wounds, or disfigures the victim, or involves a victim who is physically or mentally incapacitated." It may also "include a sexual assault that is aided or abetted by another person, occurs during commission of another crime, or involves use of a deadly weapon. Local laws should be consulted for specific requirements and applicable penalties."

Related is aggravated rape, which in the United States is "an offense of rape that is committed under circumstances which render the offense more heinous... An aggravated rape is different from a forcible rape." The severity can be affected by the age of the victim, a blood relationship between the accused and the victim, the offender being armed with a weapon, and more than one offender raping the victim. "Rape which occurs during commission of specified crimes, such as assault and battery by means of dangerous weapon, constitutes aggravated rape, punishable by harsher penalties than simple rape. [Commonwealth v. Williams (1987) 23 Mass App 716, 505 NE2d 233, 1987 Mass App LEXIS 1786]." It can also be defined as "oral, vaginal, or anal opening of a person's orifices without consent or will. The offender uses force, fear, or violence. The perpetrator uses a person's physical injuries as a way to rape the individual, uses death or kidnapping, uses a deadly weapon, or is aided by one or more people."

==== Connecticut ====
A person who commits aggravated sexual assault in the first degree, must contain the following in order to be considered aggravated sexual assault:

1. He/she is armed or uses and threatens by his/her words or conducts that he/she possesses a deadly weapon.
2. When a person intends to impair the victim permanently, or to dismember, or disable an organ of the victim's body, and causes injuries to the victim.
3. The accused engages in conduct that creates risk of death or physical injuries to the victim.
4. He/she is aided by two or more people.

Aggravated sexual assault in the first degree is classified as a Class B felony.

(Connecticut Penal Code 53a-70)

==== Georgia ====
A person who commits sexual battery is convicted with a misdemeanor of high and aggravated nature.

A person who commits Aggravated sexual battery receives a punishment of imprisonment for twenty-five years to life.

(Georgia Code §16-6-22.1 & §16-6-22.2)

==== Illinois ====
Aggravated sexual assault in Illinois includes the following:

1. Accused or displays, threatened to use, or actually used a deadly weapon in a manner as to cause the victim to believe it to be a dangerous weapon.
2. The suspect caused bodily harm to the victim.
3. The suspect threatened or endangered the life of the victim.
4. The victim was sixty years or older when sexual assault was committed.
5. The victim was handicapped.
6. The suspect was seventeen years old or over and the victim was nine years old or younger when the sexual assault was committed.

-The suspect committed aggravated sexual assault if he/she commits an act of sexual penetration with a victim who is mentally ill.

("aggravated sexual assault is classified as a Class X felony")-Illinois code 5/15-14.

==== Kansas ====
Aggravated sexual assault in Kansas includes the following:

1. Sexual intercourse orally and anally with a child under fourteen years old.
2. Coercing a child under fourteen to perform sexual activities with any other person.
3. Forcing or making a person feel fearful, so they engage in sexual intercourse orally and anally.
4. Performing sexual intercourse with a person who is unconscious or injured physically.
5. Performing sexual intercourse with a person who is mentally ill, has a disease, is drunk, and intoxicated with drug.

In Kansas aggravated sexual assault is a level 2 felony.

==== Louisiana ====
If a person commits aggravated sexual assault in Louisiana they shall serve a lifetime sentence in prison. Aggravated sexual assault in Louisiana includes the following:

1. The accused coerces the victim into sex even if they resist.
2. The accused is much more powerful physically or may threaten the victim verbally and the victim feels like they are unable to resist.
3. The accused is armed with a deadly weapon causing the victim to feel helpless.
4. The accused is aided by two or more people.

==== New Jersey ====
In New Jersey the performance of aggravated sexual assault is a first degree offense. The offense includes the following;

1. The victim is younger than thirteen but not older than sixteen.
2. The accused is a kin to the victim.
3. The sexual intercourse is committed with one or more people during a robbery, kidnapping, homicide.
4. The accused is armed with a deadly weapon and the victim is threatened.
5. The accused forces the victim to engage in sexual intercourse.
6. The accused uses physical force or the victim is mentally or physically ill.

==== New York ====
In New York, aggravated sexual abuse in the first degree is classified as a Class B violent felony.

The act must include the following to be considered aggravated sexual assault:

1. The victim is physically forced to engage in sexual intercourse;
2. The victim is physically ill and is unable to give consent; or
3. The victim is under thirteen years old.

== Sentencing ==
In the United States, a defendant convicted of aggravated sexual assault is generally sentenced to time in jail. How much time the defendant receives is determined by a judge who considers the severity and quantity of the assault or assaults.

== Court cases ==
R v Cuerrier was a Supreme Court of Canada in 1998, ruled that intentionally exposing a sexual partner to HIV, without letting them know is considered aggravated sexual assault. Currier was aware of being HIV positive and how the diseases can be transmitted, but did not want to reveal that he is HIV positive because he lived in a small community. He began to have a relationship with a woman in which they frequently engaged in sexual activities. Weeks within their relationship, the woman began to question about sexual transmitted diseases, Curreier told her that he took a test a few months ago and was tested HIV negative and did not mention his current HIV status. During the same time, Currier begin to have another sexual relationship with a woman and when she asked about Sexual Transmitted Diseases he did not mention that he was infected. She then discovered that Currier had HIV and ended the relationship. He then was charged with two counts of aggravated sexual assault. That is then when the Supreme Court determined that if a person with HIV does not disclose that they are infected it is considered aggravated sexual assault. More recently, Canadian courts have ruled that failing to disclose one's HIV status prior to sexual intercourse will not immediately result in a criminal conviction where it can be shown that the risk of HIV transmission is effectively zero. In Murphy, the Court of Appeal for Ontario allowed an appeal, overturning a historic criminal conviction for aggravated sexual assault. Though Murphy engaged in unprotected vaginal sex with the complainant knowing she was HIV positive, without disclosing this information to her sexual partner, her undetectable viral load at the time of the sexual contact meant that that there was no realistic possibility she could transmit HIV to the complainant at the time they had sexual intercourse. In such cases, the complainant's consent is not vitiated by non-disclosure of one's HIV-positive status.

(Trevis Smith court case) An ex CFL player name Trevis Smith was convicted of Aggravated Sexual Assault. In November 2003. Smith was tested HIV positive, Trevis Smith was accused of having unprotected sex with two women, their identities were not revealed. The womans claim that in the beginning of the relationship Smith did use condoms but then stopped. Smith did not disclose the information with any of the woman. Therefore, he was convicted of two counts of aggravated sexual assault.

== See also ==
- Rape
- Sexual assault
- Assault
