= Bowser and Blue =

Canadian musical duo

- Origin: Montreal, Quebec
- Genres: Comedy, Satire
- Years active: 1978–present
- Labels: Justin Time Records, You Guys Publishing
- Members: George Bowser; Richard Elger
- Website: https://bowserandblue.com/index.php

George Bowser and Rick Blue (real name Richard Elger), better known as Bowser and Blue, are a musical duo from Montreal who write and perform comedic songs. Their material ranges from absurdist humor ("I've Got a Great Big Dick", "Canadian Psychedelic Snowboarding Team", "I'm in Like with a Dyke Named Spike") to pointed political and cultural satire ("You Should Speak French", "Driving in Quebec", "Bouchard's Speech", "Clinton's Thing", "Rappin' Rambo").

== History ==
Elger spent the 1960s performing folk music in coffee houses, and played in two bands: Mantis, and The British North American Act. He met singer/songwriter George Bowser, also a long-time member of the Montreal music scene, and they began performing as a duo in 1978. Their first gig was at Montreal's Irish Lancer pub, but comedy clubs were becoming very popular and the duo discovered their comedic talent early in the 1980s. They then went on a North American tour as the opening band for Katrina and the Waves; that tour introduced them to the college market. In 1986, they were signed to Justin Time Records and released their first album, Bowser & Blue, which featured contributions from Katrina and the Waves members Kimberley Rew, Alex Cooper and Vince de la Cruz, as well as Supertramp frontman Rick Davies.

In 1988, they appeared on Just For Laughs, and began appearing weekly, and performing political satire, on the CTV Television Network show Fighting Back. Their specific appeal was the humorous defense of English-speaking Quebecers, at a time when Quebec nationalism was at its peak. They also began regularly entertaining snowbirds in the US, They began staging theatrical shows, notably at Montreal's Centaur Theatre and, from 2007 to 2012, headlined the Canadian Snowbird Extravaganza concert series.

In 1991, they formed their own label, You Guys Publishing. Their 1997 national Christmas special A Bowser and Blue Comedy Christmas: Two Nuts Roasting On An Open Fire, garnered a nomination for Best Performance or Host in a Variety Program or Series at the Gemini Awards of 1998.

They continue to perform and travel extensively across Canada and, on July 1, 2020, performed a Canada Day Virtual Covid Concert during the COVID-19 pandemic. In October 2021, with Josh Freed, Terry Mosher and Ellen David, they created the show Four Anglos Surviving the COVID Apocalypse. In 2022, they released the album Hindsight, which addresses aspects of the pandemic.

== Discography ==
Albums

- Bowser & Blue (1986), Justin Time
- Is It In Yet? (1987), Justin Time
- The Lovely & Talented Bowser & Blue (1989), Justin Time
- Westmount Rhodesians (1990), Justin Time
- Bowser & Blue Live (1991), You Guys
- Bowser & Blue At The Comedy Nest (1995), You Guys
- Montréal Souvenirs (1996), You Guys
- Troubadors (1996), You Guys
- Crackpots (1997), You Guys
- Bowser and Blue 20th Anniversary (1998), You Guys
- We're All Here... (1999), You Guys
- Red Guitars: Music for Misguided Angels (1999), You Guys
- She Wants Me (2001), You Guys
- The Illustrated Canadian Songbook (2003)
- Pull My Finger (2007), You Guys
- No Ordinary Dummies (2008), You Guys
- Live At The Cock And Bull Pub (2011), You Guys
- Schwartz's The Musical (2011), You Guys
- Openly Grey (2015), You Guys
- Hindsight (2022), You Guys

DVDs

- We're All Here... (1999), You Guys
- Humor for Boomers (2009), You Guys
- Bowser & Blue Tube (2013), You Guys

Singles

- "It Ain't Easy Being White" / "Polka Dot Undies"
- "Rappin' Rambo" / "Writing My Name in the Snow"
- "The BP Song"
- "Everything Is Cheaper in the States"
- "The Senator's Song"
- "Snow Is a Four-Letter Word"
- "That's Progress"

== Television specials ==
- Blokes (1993), CFCF-DT, CBC Newsworld
- La Fête Carrée (A Woodstock For Squareheads) (1996), CFCF-DT
- Something Bowser, Something Blue (1996), CFCF-DT
- Full Frontal Unity (1997), CTV Television Network – national
- A Bowser and Blue Comedy Christmas: Two Nuts Roasting on an Open Fire (1997), CTV Television Network
- Two Smart Fellers (1998), CFCF-DT
- We're All Here (Because We're Not All There) (1999), CFCF-DT
- She Wants Me (To Go Away) (2000), CFCF-DT

== Theatre shows ==
- Blokes (1992), Centaur Theatre, Montréal
- The Best of Bowser and Blue (1993), The Piggery Theatre, North Hatley, Québec
- Blokes Deux (1994), Centaur Theatre
- Something Bowser, Something Blue (1995), Theatre Lac-Brome, Lac-Brome, Québec
- Troubadours Through Time (1996), Centaur Theatre
- Mainly Montréal (1997), (with David Fennario and Vittorio Rossi), Centaur Theatre
- La Fête Carrée (a Woodstock for Squareheads) (1997) Just for Laughs Comedy Festival, Montréal
- Two Smart Fellers (1998), Theatre Lac-Brome
- We're All Here (Because We're Not All There) (2000), Theatre Lac-Brome
- A Pile of Hits (2001), Theatre Lac-Brome
- The Two and Only (2002), Hudson Village Theatre, Hudson, Quebec
- The Paris of America (2003), Centaur Theatre
- The 4 Anglos of the Apocalypse (2006), Theatre Lac-Brome and Centaur Theatre
- Down Our Way, and Up Yours (2007), Theatre Lac-Brome
- The 25th Century Belongs to Canada (2008), Theatre Lac-Brome and Centaur Theatre
- Schwartz's: The Musical (2011), Centaur Theatre
- The Last Night at the Gayety (2016), Centaur Theatre
- Not Necessarily a Christmas Show (2019), BLVD Bar & Grill, Châteauguay
- Four Anglos Surviving the COVID Apocalypse (2021), Théâtre Lac-Brome, St Jax Montréal
