= Johnson Aziga =

Ugandan-Canadian criminal (born 1956)

- Born: 1956 (age 69–70); Uganda
- Known for: Being convicted of first-degree murder for spreading HIV

Johnson Aziga (born 1956) is a Ugandan-born Canadian man formerly residing in Hamilton, Ontario, Canada, notable as the first person to be charged and convicted of first-degree murder in Canada for spreading HIV, after two women whom he had infected without their knowledge died.

== Background ==
Aziga was a former staffer at the Ontario Ministry of the Attorney General. According to CBC News, he was diagnosed with HIV in 1996. Aziga, who was married at the time, used protection with his wife, who knew about the diagnosis, but soon began having sex with others and got a divorce. He had unprotected sex with 11 women without telling them he was HIV-positive. He met most of his victims at bars and clubs in the Hamilton area, and many of them had unprotected sex with other HIV-positive African men. Seven of these women later tested positive for HIV, two of whom died of complications from AIDS in December 2003 and May 2004. Health officials and law enforcement were allegedly aware of Aziga's pattern of spreading HIV but did not take action until 2003 for unknown reasons.

Several Canadian courts have ruled that persons who are not informed that a sexual partner is HIV-positive cannot truly give consent to sex.

== Arrest and trial ==
Aziga was arrested in August 2003. On November 16, 2005, Justice Norman Bennett of Hamilton ruled there was sufficient evidence for Aziga to stand trial. His trial date was initially set for May 2007 but was moved back several times. The trial was set to begin October 6, 2008.

The decision to try Aziga was criticized by Richard Elliott, deputy director of the Canadian HIV/AIDS Legal Network, who described the decision as "not particularly helpful" and argued that it might lead to a "dominant impression out there of people living with HIV as potential criminals, which is not an accurate or fair representation."

Aziga was the first Canadian ever to be criminally convicted on charges for knowingly infecting others with the HIV virus without telling the victims. He was designated a "dangerous offender" under Canadian criminal law. In an earlier case, Charles Ssenyonga of London, Ontario was prosecuted on the lesser charges of aggravated assault and criminal negligence causing bodily harm, although he died of meningitis before a verdict was rendered in his case.

In the 1999 decision R. v. Cuerrier, the Supreme Court of Canada ruled that people who knowingly exposed/infected others to HIV through unprotected sex could be charged with a crime on the grounds that failure to disclose one's HIV status to a sex partner constituted fraud.

Aziga's trial began in October 2008. Among the first revelations made in trial proceedings were claims by Aziga's former girlfriends that he had lied about his HIV status and continued having unprotected sex until the morning of his arrest in 2003. Aziga's lawyers claimed that no conclusive link could be shown to indicate that the deaths of his former girlfriends could be attributed to HIV/AIDS.

On April 4, 2009, Aziga was found guilty of two counts of murder in the first degree, 10 counts of aggravated sexual assault, and one count of attempted aggravated sexual assault by a jury made up of nine men and three women at Hamilton Superior Court. The murder convictions resulted from the fact that Canadian jurisprudence has established that failure to disclose one's HIV status before unprotected sex means that the partner cannot give consent (as they have been deliberately deprived of information that might cause a reasonable person to reconsider), resulting in the sexual act becoming aggravated sexual assault. Under Canadian law, any death resulting from aggravated sexual assault (i.e. the two women who died as a result of HIV/AIDS complications) is automatically murder in the first degree. Aziga was sentenced to life imprisonment with no possibility of parole for 25 years, the mandatory sentence in Canada for a conviction of first-degree murder. Aziga expressed his intention to appeal his conviction.

On August 2, 2011, a court in Hamilton, Ont. granted a request by Crown Prosecutors to have Johnson Aziga jailed indefinitely under the Dangerous Offender act, because he was believed to be at a high risk to re-offend.

== See also ==
- R. v. Cuerrier
- Aki Hakkarainen
- Trevis Smith
- Carl Leone
- Criminal transmission of HIV
