= 2001 reasons of the Supreme Court of Canada =

The table below lists the reasons delivered from the bench by the Supreme Court of Canada during 2001. The table illustrates what reasons were filed by each justice in each case, and which justices joined each reason. This list, however, does not include decisions on motions.

Of the 90 judgments released in 2001, 16 were oral, and 68 were unanimous, with 4 motions.

== Reasons ==
Case name	Argued	Decided	McLachlin	L'Heureux- Dubé	Gonthier	Iacobucci	Major	Bastarache	Binnie	Arbour	LeBel
R. v. Latimer, [2001] 1 S.C.R. 3; 2001 SCC 1	June 14, 2000	January 18, 2001									
R. v. Sharpe, [2001] 1 S.C.R. 45; 2001 SCC 2	January 18, 19, 2000	January 26, 2001									
R. v. Parrott, [2001] 1 S.C.R. 178; 2001 SCC 3	January 27, 2000	January 26, 2001									
Ellis-Don Ltd. v. Ontario (Labour Relations Board), [2001] 1 S.C.R. 221; 2001 SCC 4	February 15, 2000	January 26, 2001									
R. v. Deane, [2001] 1 S.C.R. 279; 2001 SCC 5	January 26, 2001	January 26, 2001	V								
R. v. Ferguson, [2001] 1 S.C.R. 281; 2001 SCC 6	January 26, 2001	January 26, 2001					V				
United States v. Burns, [2001] 1 S.C.R. 283; 2001 SCC 7	May 23, 2000	February 15, 2001									
R. v. Guttman, [2001] 1 S.C.R. 363; 2001 SCC 8	February 21, 2001	February 21, 2001								V	
R. v. Berntson, [2001] 1 S.C.R. 365; 2001 SCC 9	February 23, 2001	February 23, 2001				V					
Backman v. Canada, [2001] 1 S.C.R. 367; 2001 SCC 10	November 10, 2000	March 1, 2001									
Case name	Argued	Decided	McLachlin	L'Heureux- Dubé	Gonthier	Iacobucci	Major	Bastarache	Binnie	Arbour	LeBel
Spire Freezers Ltd. v. Canada, [2001] 1 S.C.R. 391; 2001 SCC 11	November 10, 2000	March 1, 2001									
Miller v. Canada, [2001] 1 S.C.R. 407; 2001 SCC 12	November 1, 2000	March 1, 2001									
Miller v. Monit International Inc., [2001] 1 S.C.R. 432; 2001 SCC 13	November 1, 2000	March 1, 2001									
R. v. McClure, [2001] 1 S.C.R. 445; 2001 SCC 14	October 5, 2000	March 2, 2001									
Ontario English Catholic Teachers' Assn. v. Ontario (Attorney General), [2001] 1 S.C.R. 470; 2001 SCC 15	November 8, 2000	March 8, 2001									
R. v. Z.L., [2001] 1 S.C.R. 528; 2001 SCC 16	March 16, 2001	March 16, 2001				V					
R. v. W.B.C., [2001] 1 S.C.R. 530; 2001 SCC 17	March 16, 2001	March 16, 2001				V					
United States of America v. Kwok, [2001] 1 S.C.R. 532; 2001 SCC 18	March 24, 2000	April 5, 2001									
United States of America v. Cobb, [2001] 1 S.C.R. 587; 2001 SCC 19	March 24, 2000	April 5, 2001									
United States of America v. Tsioubris, [2001] 1 S.C.R. 613; 2001 SCC 20	March 24, 2000	April 5, 2001									
Case name	Argued	Decided	McLachlin	L'Heureux- Dubé	Gonthier	Iacobucci	Major	Bastarache	Binnie	Arbour	LeBel
United States of America v. Shulman, [2001] 1 S.C.R. 616; 2001 SCC 21	March 24, 2000	April 5, 2001									
Walker Estate v. York Finch General Hospital, [2001] 1 S.C.R. 647; 2001 SCC 23	November 7, 2000	April 19, 2001									
R. v. Ruzic, [2001] 1 S.C.R. 687; 2001 SCC 24	June 13, 2000	April 20, 2001									
R. v. Rideout, [2001] 1 S.C.R. 755; 2001 SCC 27	April 26, 2001	April 26, 2001					V				
R. v. Pakoo, [2001] 1 S.C.R. 757; 2001 SCC 28	April 26, 2001	April 26, 2001					V				
R. v. Dutra, [2001] 1 S.C.R. 759; 2001 SCC 29	May 16, 2001	May 16, 2001				V					
R. v. Parent, [2001] 1 S.C.R. 761; 2001 SCC 30	March 14, 2001	May 17, 2001									
Trinity Western University v. British Columbia College of Teachers, [2001] 1 S.C.R. 772; 2001 SCC 31	November 9, 2000	May 17, 2001									
R. v. Find, [2001] 1 S.C.R. 863; 2001 SCC 32	October 13, 2000	May 24, 2001									
Mitchell v. M.N.R., [2001] 1 S.C.R. 911; 2001 SCC 33	June 16, 2000	May 24, 2001									
Case name	Argued	Decided	McLachlin	L'Heureux- Dubé	Gonthier	Iacobucci	Major	Bastarache	Binnie	Arbour	LeBel
R. v. Peters; R. v. Rendon, [2001] 1 S.C.R. 997; 2001 SCC 34	May 24, 2001	May 24, 2001						V			
Therrien (Re), [2001] 2 S.C.R. 3; 2001 SCC 35	October 2, 2000	June 7, 2001									
Canada (Deputy Minister of National Revenue) v. Mattel Canada Inc., [2001] 2 S.C.R. 100; 2001 SCC 36	February 20, 2000	June 7, 2001									
Committee for the Equal Treatment of Asbestos Minority Shareholders v. Ontario (Securities Commission), [2001] 2 S.C.R. 132; 2001 SCC 37	December 15, 2000	June 7, 2001									
McKinley v. BC Tel, [2001] 2 S.C.R. 161; 2001 SCC 38	January 24, 2001	June 28, 2001									
Noël v. Société d'énergie de la Baie James, [2001] 2 S.C.R. 207; 2001 SCC 39	October 11, 2000	June 28, 2001									
114957 Canada Ltée (Spraytech, Société d'arrosage) v. Hudson (Town), [2001] 2 S.C.R. 241; 2001 SCC 40	December 7, 2000	June 28, 2001									
Mount Sinai Hospital Centre v. Quebec (Minister of Health and Social Services), [2001] 2 S.C.R. 281; 2001 SCC 41	December 12, 2000	June 29, 2001									
R. v. Pan; R. v. Sawyer, [2001] 2 S.C.R. 344; 2001 SCC 42	December 8, 2000	June 29, 2001									
Boston v. Boston, [2001] 2 S.C.R. 413; 2001 SCC 43	January 17, 2001	July 12, 2001									
Case name	Argued	Decided	McLachlin	L'Heureux- Dubé	Gonthier	Iacobucci	Major	Bastarache	Binnie	Arbour	LeBel
Danyluk v. Ainsworth Technologies Inc., [2001] 2 S.C.R. 460; 2001 SCC 44	October 31, 2000	July 12, 2001									
Fortin v. Chrétien, [2001] 2 S.C.R. 500; 2001 SCC 45	November 2, 2000	July 12, 2001									
Western Canadian Shopping Centres Inc. v. Dutton, [2001] 2 S.C.R. 534; 2001 SCC 46	December 13, 2000	July 13, 2001									
Ivanhoe inc. v. UFCW, Local 500, [2001] 2 S.C.R. 565; 2001 SCC 47	October 30, 2000	July 13, 2001									
Sept-Îles (City) v. Quebec (Labour Court), [2001] 2 S.C.R. 670; 2001 SCC 48	October 30, 2000	July 13, 2001									
Monenco Ltd. v. Commonwealth Insurance Co., [2001] 2 S.C.R. 699; 2001 SCC 49	March 13, 2001	September 13, 2001									
Marcoux v. Bouchard, [2001] 2 S.C.R. 726; 2001 SCC 50	May 25, 2001	September 13, 2001									
Lac d'Amiante du Québec Ltée v. 2858-0702 Québec Inc., [2001] 2 S.C.R. 743; 2001 SCC 51	January 18, 2001	September 13, 2001									
Ocean Port Hotel Ltd. v. British Columbia (General Manager, Liquor Control and Licensing Branch), [2001] 2 S.C.R. 781; 2001 SCC 52	March 22, 2001	September 14, 2001									
R. v. Russell, [2001] 2 S.C.R. 804; 2001 SCC 53	April 19, 2001	September 14, 2001									
Case name	Argued	Decided	McLachlin	L'Heureux- Dubé	Gonthier	Iacobucci	Major	Bastarache	Binnie	Arbour	LeBel
R.v. Arcuri, [2001] 2 S.C.R. 828; 2001 SCC 54	April 19, 2001	September 14, 2001									
Berendsen v. Ontario, [2001] 2 S.C.R. 849; 2001 SCC 55	April 23, 2001	September 27, 2001									
R. v. Ulybel Enterprises Ltd., [2001] 2 S.C.R. 867; 2001 SCC 56	January 16, 2001	September 27, 2001									
Saint-Romuald (City) v. Olivier, [2001] 2 S.C.R. 898; 2001 SCC 57	December 5, 2000	September 27, 2001									
Naylor Group Inc. v. Ellis-Don Construction Ltd., [2001] 2 S.C.R. 943; 2001 SCC 58	January 22, 2001	September 27, 2001									
671122 Ontario Ltd. v. Sagaz Industries Canada Inc., [2001] 2 S.C.R. 983; 2001 SCC 59	June 19, 2001	September 28, 2001									
Van de Perre v. Edwards, [2001] 2 S.C.R. 1014; 2001 SCC 60	June 14, 2001	September 28, 2001									
Singleton v. Canada, [2001] 2 S.C.R. 1046; 2001 SCC 61	March 19, 2001	September 28, 2001									
Ludco Enterprises Ltd. v. Canada, [2001] 2 S.C.R. 1082; 2001 SCC 62	March 19, 2001	September 28, 2001									
R. v. Mankwe, [2001] 3 S.C.R. 3; 2001 SCC 63	October 2, 2001	October 2, 2001	V								
Case name	Argued	Decided	McLachlin	L'Heureux- Dubé	Gonthier	Iacobucci	Major	Bastarache	Binnie	Arbour	LeBel
Autobus Thomas Inc. v. Canada, [2001] 3 S.C.R. 5; 2001 SCC 64	October 11, 2001	October 11, 2001			V						
R. v. J.W.R., [2001] 3 S.C.R. 7; 2001 SCC 65	October 12, 2001	October 12, 2001				V					
Proulx v. Quebec (Attorney General), [2001] 3 S.C.R. 9; 2001 SCC 66	December 11, 2000	October 18, 2001									
Law Society of British Columbia v. Mangat, [2001] 3 S.C.R. 113; 2001 SCC 67	March 21, 2001	October 18, 2001									
Hollick v. Toronto (City), [2001] 3 S.C.R. 158; 2001 SCC 68	June 13, 2001	October 18, 2001									
Rumley v. British Columbia, [2001] 3 S.C.R. 184; 2001 SCC 69	June 13, 2001	October 18, 2001									
R. v. Advance Cutting & Coring Ltd., [2001] 3 S.C.R. 209; 2001 SCC 70	March 30, 2000	October 19, 2001									
R. v. Rhee, [2001] 3 S.C.R. 364; 2001 SCC 71	April 27, 2001	October 19, 2001									
Derksen v. 539938 Ontario Ltd., [2001] 3 S.C.R. 398; 2001 SCC 72	April 25, 2001	October 19, 2001									
R. v. Scott, [2001] 3 S.C.R. 425; 2001 SCC 73	November 9, 2001	November 9, 2001	V								
Case name	Argued	Decided	McLachlin	L'Heureux- Dubé	Gonthier	Iacobucci	Major	Bastarache	Binnie	Arbour	LeBel
R. v. Jabarianha, [2001] 3 S.C.R. 430; 2001 SCC 75	May 15, 2001	November 15, 2001									
R. v. Mentuck, [2001] 3 S.C.R. 442; 2001 SCC 76	June 18, 2001	November 15, 2001									
R v O.N.E., [2001] 3 S.C.R. 478; 2001 SCC 77	June 18, 2001	November 15, 2001									
R. v. Nette, [2001] 3 S.C.R. 488; 2001 SCC 78	January 16, 2001	November 15, 2001									
Cooper v. Hobart, [2001] 3 S.C.R. 537; 2001 SCC 79	June 20, 2001	November 16, 2001									
Edwards v. Law Society of Upper Canada, [2001] 3 S.C.R. 562; 2001 SCC 80	June 20, 2001	November 16, 2001									
R. v. 974649 Ontario Inc., [2001] 3 S.C.R. 575; 2001 SCC 81	December 6, 2000	December 6, 2001	V								
R. v. Hynes, [2001] 3 S.C.R. 623; 2001 SCC 82	February 13, 2001	December 6, 2001									
R. v. Golden, [2001] 3 S.C.R. 679; 2001 SCC 83	February 15, 2001	December 6, 2001									
Paul D'Aoust Construction Ltd. v. Markel Insurance Co. of Canada, [2001] 3 S.C.R. 744; 2001 SCC 84	December 5, 2001	December 5, 2001			V						
Case name	Argued	Decided	McLachlin	L'Heureux- Dubé	Gonthier	Iacobucci	Major	Bastarache	Binnie	Arbour	LeBel
Osoyoos Indian Band v. Oliver (Town), [2001] 3 S.C.R. 746; 2001 SCC 85	June 12, 2001	December 7, 2001									
R. v. Khan, [2001] 3 S.C.R. 823; 2001 SCC 86	December 12, 2000	December 7, 2001									
Prévost-Masson v. General Trust of Canada, [2001] 3 S.C.R. 882; 2001 SCC 87	May 16, 2001	December 7, 2001									
Smith v. Canada (Attorney General), [2001] 3 S.C.R. 902; 2001 SCC 88	November 7, 2001	December 7, 2001									
Privacy Act (Can.) (Re), [2001] 3 S.C.R. 905; 2001 SCC 89	November 7, 2001	December 7, 2001									
Holt Cargo Systems Inc. v. ABC Containerline N.V. (Trustees of), [2001] 3 S.C.R. 907; 2001 SCC 90	March 20, 2001	December 20, 2001									
Antwerp Bulkcarriers, N.V. (Re), [2001] 3 S.C.R. 951; 2001 SCC 91	March 20, 2001	December 20, 2001									
Sam Lévy & Associés Inc. v. Azco Mining Inc., [2001] 3 S.C.R. 978; 2001 SCC 92	May 15, 2001	December 20, 2001									
R. v. Larivière, [2001] 3 S.C.R. 1013; 2001 SCC 93	December 5, 2001	December 20, 2001									
Dunmore v. Ontario (Attorney General), [2001] 3 S.C.R. 1016; 2001 SCC 94	February 19, 2001	December 20, 2001									

== Justices of the Supreme Court ==
Justice	Reasons written	Votes cast	% Majority
Chief Justice Beverley McLachlin	17 / 0 / 0 / 0 / Total=17	47 / 2 / 0 / 2 / Total=51	66 of 68 (97.06%)
Puisne Justice Claire L'Heureux-Dubé	1 / 3 / 0 / 4 / Total=08	51 / 0 / 0 / 3 / Total=54	55 of 62 (88.71%)
Puisne Justice Charles Gonthier	5 / 0 / 0 / 3 / Total=08	60 / 1 / 0 / 3 / Total=64	66 of 72 (91.67%)
Puisne Justice Frank Iacobucci	20 / 1 / 0 / 0 / Total=21	52 / 0 / 1 / 1 / Total=54	73 of 75 (97.33%)
Puisne Justice John C. Major	13 / 0 / 0 / 2 / Total=15	60 / 1 / 1 / 3 / Total=65	74 of 80 (92.5%)
Pusine Justice Michel Bastarache	9 / 0 / 2 / 3 / Total=14	64 / 1 / 0 / 3 / Total=68	74 of 82 (90.24%)
Puisne Justice Ian Binnie	8 / 2 / 0 / 1 / Total=11	69 / 0 / 0 / 2 / Total=71	79 of 82 (96.34%)
Pusine Justice Louise Arbour	12 / 0 / 0 / 0 / Total=12	72 / 0 / 0 / 1 / Total=73	84 of 85 (98.82%)
Pusine Justice Louis LeBel	7 / 1 / 1 / 5 / Total=14	57 / 0 / 0 / 0 / Total=57	65 of 71 (91.55%)
This Notes on statistics: A justice is only included in the majority if they have joined or concurred in the Court's judgment in full. Percentages are based only on the cases in which a justice participated, and are rounded to the nearest tenth of a percent.

== Table key ==
Delivered the Court's reason
Joined the Court's reason
Filed a concurrence
Joined a concurrence
Filed a dissent
Joined a dissent
Filed a concurrence/dissent
Joined a concurrence/dissent
Did not participate in the judgment
Did not participate in the final disposition of the judgment
Not a member of the Court at the time of hearing or delivering
- Decisions that do not note a Justice delivering the Court's reason are per coram.
- Multiple concurrences and dissents within a case are numbered, with joining votes numbered accordingly. Justices occasionally join multiple reasons in a single case; each vote is subdivided accordingly.
- Multiple unnumbered reasons are jointly written or delivered.
- Decisions that are given orally from the bench are denoted by a "V"; per coram decisions delivered orally from the bench only note a "V" on the most senior justice on the panel.
- An asterisk ( * ) in the Court's opinion denotes that it was only a majority in part or a plurality.
