= R v Golden =

Canadian legal decision

- Supreme Court of Canada

Hearing: February 15, 2001 Judgment: December 6, 2001
- Full case name: Ian Vincent Golden v. Her Majesty The Queen
- Citations: 2001 SCC 83
- Docket No.: 27547
- Prior history: Judgment for Crown in the Court of Appeal for Ontario

Court membership
- Chief Justice: Beverley McLachlin; Puisne Justices: Claire L'Heureux-Dubé, Charles Gonthier, Frank Iacobucci, John C. Major, Michel Bastarache, Ian Binnie, Louise Arbour, Louis LeBel

Reasons given
- Majority: Iacobucci and Arbour J, joined by Major, Binnie, and LeBel JJ
- Dissent: McLachlin CJ and L’Heureux‑Dubé J, joined by Gonthier and Bastarache JJ

R v Golden, 2001 SCC 83 is a landmark decision of the Supreme Court of Canada on limitations to the power of police officers to perform strip searches. The Court held that the common law rule allowing police officers to perform warrantless searches incident to arrest must be limited in relation to strip searches, citing their heightened intrusiveness and impact on the Charter protected privacy interests of the accused.

The Court also limited how strip searches may be performed. Requiring that, barring exigent circumstances, they be conducted at a police station instead of the place of arrest. And established criteria to assess the reasonableness of strip searches under section 8 of the Canadian Charter of Rights and Freedoms.

== Background ==
=== Section 8 ===
Section 8 of the Charter states:

Everyone has the right to be secure against unreasonable search or seizure.

Warrantless searches are deemed prima facie unreasonable. In order to be justified, the crown has the burden of establishing that a) the search was authorized by law, b) that the law itself was reasonable, and c) that the search was carried out in a reasonable manner.

The Search Incident to Arrest (SITA) rule is a common law authority that allows police officers to search a lawfully arrested person if they reasonably believe it will advance the objectives of arrest. Which include, the discovery of evidence related to the arrest, the preservation of evidence from destruction, and ensuring the safety of the officer or arrestee. This standard can be distinguished from the typical requirement for search warrants, in that police officers don't need reasonable and probable grounds to conduct the search, beyond the reasonable and probable grounds necessary to perform the arrest in the first place.

=== Factual background ===
On January 18, 1997, the Metropolitan Toronto Police Force set up an observation deck across from a Subway shop, in an area drug trafficking was known to occur. One of the officers observed Ian Golden, and saw two transactions in which people entered the shop and received a substance from him. Believing the substance to be crack cocaine, he instructed another officer to arrest him.

On arrest, they found further substance under the table near Golden, and observed him crushing some more between his fingers. An officer then decided to frisk him, after no further weapons or narcotics were discovered he decided to perform a visual inspection of his underwear. The inspection was performed on top of the platform near the stairs to the basement, where the public washrooms were located. The officers pulled down Golden's pants and underwear, revealing a plastic wrap containing a white substance protruding from his anus.

An officer attempted to retrieve the bag but Golden resisted and scratched him. The officers then escorted him to a seating booth at the back of the lobby, where they forced him to bend over, and then lowered his pants and underwear to his knees. The officers attempted to forcibly remove the package from his buttocks but were not successful. Following the attempts, Golden accidentally defecated. An officer retrieved rubber dishwashing gloves and was finally able to dislodge the package. After the ordeal, Golden was placed under arrest for possession of narcotics for the purpose of trafficking and assaulting a peace officer.

=== In lower courts ===
At trial, he attempted to challenge the admission of the bag into evidence under section 24(2) of the Charter, alleging his rights under section 8 were breached. His application was denied and he was subsequently found guilty by a jury for possession of a narcotic for the purpose of trafficking, but acquitted on the assault charge. He was sentenced to 14 months imprisonment, and his appeal to the Ontario Court of Appeal was dismissed.

== Judgement ==
The Court held that the SITA rule must be modified as it relates to strip searches in order to be Charter compliant. In reaching the decision, the Court found that purpose of section 8 is to prevent unjustified state intrusions into the privacy of individuals, and that it was important to stop unconstitutional searches before they happened instead of just declaring their unlawfulness after the fact. The Court then proceeded to note that these interests were amplified when dealing with strip searches because of their uniquely degrading nature.

Strip searches are... inherently humiliating and degrading for detainees regardless of the manner in which they are carried out

— Supreme Court of Canada, R v Golden, para 90

The Court held that in order to be valid at common law, a strip search can only be conducted for the purpose of seizing weapons in the detainee's possession or evidence related to the reason for arrest. And that the police must establish on reasonable and probable grounds that a strip search was necessary for those purposes. It further ruled that strip searches may only be conducted at police stations, unless the police can establish on reasonable and probable grounds that there were exigent circumstances requiring them to conduct one on the field.

Moreover, the Court emphasised that strip searches should only be performed when the circumstances of a particular case requires them, and not as a matter of routine policy.

=== Golden criteria ===
The Court also established a set of criteria to assess the reasonableness of individual strip searches under the final branch of the section 8 analysis. It did this by prescribing a series of questions for police officers to take into account when conducting strip searches.

1. Can the strip search be conducted at the police station and, if not, why not?
2. Will the strip search be conducted in a manner that ensures the health and safety of all involved?
3. Will the strip search be authorized by a police officer acting in a supervisory capacity?
4. Has it been ensured that the police officer(s) carrying out the strip search are of the same gender as the individual being searched?
5. Will the number of police officers involved in the search be no more than is reasonably necessary in the circumstances?
6. What is the minimum of force necessary to conduct the strip search?
7. Will the strip search be carried out in a private area such that no one other than the individuals engaged in the search can observe the search?
8. Will the strip search be conducted as quickly as possible and in a way that ensures that the person is not completely undressed at any one time?
9. Will the strip search involve only a visual inspection of the arrestee's genital and anal areas without any physical contact?
10. If the visual inspection reveals the presence of a weapon or evidence in a body cavity (not including the mouth), will the detainee be given the option of removing the object himself or of having the object removed by a trained medical professional?
11. Will a proper record be kept of the reasons for and the manner in which the strip search was conducted?

== Aftermath ==
=== Toronto Police Service compliance issues ===
In 2019, the Office of the Independent Police Review Director (OIPRD) released a scathing report accusing the Toronto Police Service of violating the ruling. The report found that the police service conducted an excessive amount of unnecessary and unlawful searches. The OIPRD found that nearly 40% of all arrests made by the TPS resulted in a strip search, a rate 40 times higher than that of other comparable police forces in Ontario. Despite the Supreme's Court stating that strip searches should not be carried out as a matter of routine policy. The service was also involved in 40 of 89 surveyed post-Golden decisions in which a strip search was held to violate the accused's Charter rights.

After the report, the service overhauled its procedures, established new mandatory training, and set up a process to record, monitor, and audit all strip searches. The reforms had significant effect and the number of weekly searches dropped from a pre-pandemic high of 273, to 35-40 per week as of November 2020. As a result of the changes, Interim Toronto police chief James Ramer stated, "Clearly, we were doing it wrong, and changes needed to be made” and said that he expected the number of strip searches to drop further as improvements continued to be implemented.

== See also ==
- 2001 reasons of the Supreme Court of Canada
- R v Fearon
