= Carl Leone =

Canadian businessman

Carl Desmond Leone (born c.1976) is a Canadian businessman from Windsor, Ontario. Leone was jailed after pleading guilty in a Windsor court to 15 counts of aggravated sexual assault for not informing his sexual partners of his positive HIV status. It is believed he has been charged with exposing more women to the AIDS-causing virus than anyone in Canadian history. Two of his victims have attempted suicide.

== Diagnosis and subsequent actions ==
In 1997, Leone was told by Windsor Essex County Health Unit workers that he was HIV-positive. Seven years later on June 6, 2004, he was arrested. On June 10, police issued a public safety advisory that resulted in more than 100 people seeking HIV tests for having been a partner of Leone or possibly being linked to him. Under Canadian criminal law, people knowing they are HIV positive have a legal duty to disclose their HIV status before engaging in behaviors that put another person at significant risk of serious bodily harm. This is the result of the 1998 ruling by the Supreme Court of Canada in R. v. Cuerrier, which held that a partner cannot truly give informed consent if the other fails to disclose their HIV status.

Complainants said they would not have been Leone's partner had he been truthful about his status. Six of the 22 complainants tested positive for HIV (three of them learned of their condition after his arrest) with the same rare strain that Leone was infected with. The strain is extremely rare in Canada, and the number of local cases represented an unusually high concentration for the country and constituted a public health issue for the Public Health Agency of Canada. Dr. Paul Sandstrom, director of the National HIV & Retrovirology Laboratories, testified that "Windsor cluster" was unique in North America because it is a different HIV strain infection than the one that began spreading across North America in the early-1980s and is more commonly found in Southeast Asia.

== Legal proceedings ==
Initially, Leone was refused bail but turned to well-known criminal defence lawyer Edward Greenspan who successfully appealed the decision. Leone was released after posting bail of nearly $800,000.

By the time of the trial, Leone was represented by Andrew Bradie. On April 27, 2007, prior to any of the complainants testifying, Leone agreed to plead guilty. The agreement spared the complainants the experience of testifying and also marked the first time he publicly acknowledged his HIV-positive status.

On October 23, 2007, the Deputy Attorney General of Ontario approved the Crown attorney's motion to pursue a dangerous offender designation for Leone. Under the Criminal Code, a person designated a dangerous offender may be indefinitely incarcerated so that they do not get released into society if there is a fear they may re-offend due to their violent tendencies.

== Sentence ==
At the time of sentencing, the Windsor Star interviewed detectives Pat Keane and Bill Stibbard, who investigated the case, and a pair of Leone's victims who were 17 and 18 at the time of Leone's offences. The detectives and women described how Leone lured the teenage girls (under the drinking age) through internet chatrooms and online messengers to night clubs, drugged them, took them to other locations, and engaged in unprotected sex with their unconscious bodies. The detectives said that at least four victims claimed that Leone had raped them while unconscious. The detectives also told of a 16-year-old girl and another woman, who was a virgin when she met Leone, whom he infected with HIV. In trial, Leone's parole officer claimed that Leone informed her that he had purchased date rape drugs from drug dealers.

Leone was sentenced to 18 years in prison in April 2008, with eligibility for parole in six years. The judge said he was unable to designate him a dangerous offender because there was insufficient evidence that he would commit similar offences if released.

He was twice refused day parole in November 2015 and September 2016, but was granted in April 2017. Leone planned to move back to Windsor to live with his family.

== See also ==
- Criminal transmission of HIV
