= Trevis Smith =

American gridiron football player (born 1976)

Trevis Smith (born September 8, 1976) is a former football linebacker who played seven years with the Saskatchewan Roughriders of the Canadian Football League (CFL). Born in Montgomery, Alabama, Smith was formerly a linebacker for the University of Alabama.

On October 28, 2005, Smith was charged with aggravated sexual assault in Surrey, BC for knowingly exposing women to HIV by having unprotected sex with them and not revealing his condition. Constable Marc Searle of the RCMP named a complainant called simply "A. O." who claimed that Smith had assaulted her between November 26, 2003, and May 18, 2005. After appearing in court in Surrey, he was freed on a C$10,000 bail after pleading "not guilty". On November 18, Smith was charged with the same offence in Regina, Saskatchewan after another woman came forward alleging that Smith did not tell her that he was HIV positive before they had unprotected sex.

Smith was found guilty of two counts of aggravated sexual assault—one for each woman—and bail violations on February 8, 2007, and sentenced to 5 1/2 years in jail on February 26, 2007; he unsuccessfully appealed the conviction.

Smith was released from prison on February 25, 2009, and was deported to the United States. On August 18, 2012, it was reported that Smith was dismissed from his position as a high school football coach in Birmingham, Alabama, after the George Washington Carver High School learned of his conviction for aggravated sexual assault.

== See also ==
- Johnson Aziga
- R. v. Cuerrier
