= R v Fearon =

- Supreme Court of Canada

Hearing: 23 May 2014 Judgment: 11 December 2014
- Full case name: Kevin Fearon v Her Majesty The Queen
- Citations: 2014 SCC 77
- Docket No.: 35298
- Prior history: APPEAL from R v. Fearon, 2013 ONCA 106 (20 February 2013), dismissing R v. Fearon, 2010 ONCJ 645 (23 December 2010). Leave to appeal granted, Kevin Fearon v. Her Majesty The Queen, 2013 CanLII 42522 (11 July 2013), Supreme Court (Canada)
- Ruling: Appeal dismissed.

Holding
- Warrantless search of a cell phone incident to arrest is constitutional, provided that the nature and extent of the search are truly incident to arrest, that any search effected to discover evidence be necessary in order to avoid hampering of the investigation, and that law enforcement take detailed notes of the search.

Court membership
- Chief Justice: Beverley McLachlin; Puisne Justices: Rosalie Abella, Marshall Rothstein, Thomas Cromwell, Michael Moldaver, Andromache Karakatsanis, Richard Wagner, Clément Gascon

Reasons given
- Majority: Cromwell J, joined by McLachlin CJ, Moldaver and Wagner JJ
- Dissent: Karakatsanis J, joined by LeBel and Abella JJ
- Rothstein and Gascon JJ took no part in the consideration or decision of the case.

R v Fearon [2014] S.C.R., 2014 SCC 77 is a leading section 8 Canadian constitutional law case, concerning the constitutionality of warrantless law enforcement searches of the contents of a cell phone incident to arrest.

== Background ==
The appellant, Kevin Fearon, and an accomplice robbed a jewelry merchant and fled in a black getaway vehicle. A police investigation resulted in Fearon's arrest that night. At the time of Fearon's arrest, police had not yet recovered the handgun Fearon used to commit the robbery or the jewelry he stole. Police conducted a pat-down search of Fearon incident to arrest and, discovering an unlocked, unencrypted cell phone on his person, searched the phone. The arresting officer did not have a warrant to search the phone at that time. The search revealed, inter alia, a draft text message reading “We did it were the jewelry at nigga burrrrrrrrrrr” and a photograph of a handgun that matched a handgun later recovered by police. Fearon was charged with robbery with a firearm and related offences. Police obtained a warrant to search the phone several months after Fearon's arrest but did not uncover any new evidence.

== The courts below ==
At trial, Fearon argued that the police search of his cell phone incident to arrest was unconstitutional, violating section 8 of the Charter, and moved for the evidence to be excluded under section 24(2) of the Charter. The trial judge convicted Fearon of robbery with a firearm, holding that the police had a "reasonable prospect of securing evidence of the offence for which [Fearon] was being arrested" and that the information stored in the cell phone, while private, was not "so connected to the dignity of the person" to limit the police's common-law power of search incident to arrest. The trial judge admitted the evidence found on the cell phone, finding that its exclusion would undermine the judicial system.

The Ontario Court of Appeal, agreeing to hear Fearon's appeal, unanimously upheld the conviction in a decision written by Justice Armstrong, holding that a cursory cell phone search fell within the common-law doctrine of search incident to arrest set out in R v Caslake.

Fearon appealed to the Supreme Court of Canada.

== Judgment of the SCC ==
The Supreme Court dismissed Fearon's appeal in a 4–3 decision. All seven justices of the Court agreed that cell phones without passcode protection have no less of a privacy interest than passcode-protected phones. However, the Court was split as to whether the common-law doctrine of search incident to arrest justified a search of the contents of a cell phone.

=== Majority ===
A majority of the Supreme Court, led by Cromwell J, affirmed the validity of the search incident to arrest framework as set out in R v Caslake and R v Golden. The majority found that the search of Fearon's cell phone was conducted subsequent to a lawful arrest and was truly incidental to the arrest, as it was conducted to locate the handgun, thus ensuring public safety; to locating the stolen jewelry, thus avoiding the loss of evidence; and to obtain evidence about the crime and any accomplices to the robbery.

Next, the majority determined that the common-law doctrine of search incident to arrest—a power granting police the opportunity to conduct a search without a warrant or without reasonable and probable grounds—should be modified to comply with section 8 of the Charter. The majority rejected an outright categorical prohibition on warrantless cell phone searches incident to arrest, finding that this would conflict with valid law enforcement objectives, including police and general public safety, and noting that a cell phone search is not necessarily a significant privacy invasion. The majority equally rejected a moderate approach that would require reasonable and probable grounds for a cell phone search incident to arrest, again finding that this would hamper and undermine law enforcement objectives. The majority also dismissed an approach that would allow cell phone searches incident to arrest only in exigent circumstances, finding that this would "effectively gut" police powers and would conflict with established Supreme Court jurisprudence on this issue.

Instead, the majority proposed three modifications to the existing common-law framework. First, the nature and extent of the search must be truly incidental to arrest, thus allowing access only to information with a "necessary link" to the purpose of the search. Second, cell phone searches incident to arrest undertaken to discover evidence will be valid only if the investigation would be "stymied or significantly hampered" were it not for the search. Third, officers conducting cell phone searches incident to arrest must take comprehensive notes of the examination, detailing the purpose, extent and duration of the search as well as any applications accessed.

The majority held that the evidence should not be excluded under section 24(2) of the Charter, on the basis of the Grant factors. Although the search of Fearon's phone impinged on his privacy, the breach was not particularly serious, and the police legitimately believed that they were acting reasonably and in good faith. The majority agreed with the trial judge's assessment that excluding the evidence would undermine the judiciary's truth-seeking function.

=== Dissent ===
The dissenting judges, led by Karakatsanis J, would have allowed the appeal. They found the search unconstitutional, holding that warrantless search of a cell phone incident to arrest is prima facie unreasonable, as it is not authorized by law. The dissenting judges found a high expectation of privacy in cell phones, recognizing the immense data storage and retention capabilities of modern cell phones, the volume of metadata generated by cell phones, and the possibility that a search of a cell phone might access data stored in the cloud, not on the cell phone itself. Quoting:

"We live in a time of profound technological change and innovation. Developments in mobile communications and computing technology have revolutionized our daily lives. Individuals can, while walking down the street, converse with family on the other side of the world, browse vast stores of human knowledge and information over the Internet, or share a video, photograph or comment about their experiences with a legion of friends and followers.

"The devices which give us this freedom also generate immense stores of data about our movements and our lives. Ever-improving GPS technology even allows these devices to track the locations of their owners. Private digital devices record not only our core biographical information but our conversations, photos, browsing interests, purchase records, and leisure pursuits. Our digital footprint is often enough to reconstruct the events of our lives, our relationships with others, our likes and dislikes, our fears, hopes, opinions, beliefs and ideas. Our digital devices are windows to our inner private lives.

"Therefore, as technology changes, our law must also evolve so that modern mobile devices do not become the telescreens of George Orwell’s 1984."

The dissenting judges noted the law enforcement objectives set out by the majority but suggested that they would be more fairly balanced with privacy interests given a modification of the common-law framework allowing warrantless cell phone searches incident to arrest only in exigent circumstances. Exigent circumstances would require of law enforcement a "reasonable basis to suspect a search may prevent an imminent threat to safety or... reasonable grounds to believe that the imminent loss or destruction of evidence may be prevented by a warrantless search". Under the dissenting judges' modification, the objective of protecting officer safety would justify a warrantless search only if the officer had a reasonable suspicion that the phone had been used to generate a threat to his safety. Likewise, the preservation of evidence objective would justify a warrantless search only in those cases where it was reasonable to believe that evidence was being destroyed and that a cell phone search could prevent this destruction. In any other, non-exigent circumstances, the dissenting judges held that a warrant would be required for the search.

The dissenting judges would also have excluded the evidence under section 24(2) of the Charter, on the basis of the seriousness of the breach of Fearon's substantial privacy interest in the contents of his cell phone.

== Impact ==
The Canadian Internet Policy and Public Interest Clinic suggested that the decision "transforms the traditional incident to arrest search into a far broader fishing expedition".

== See also ==
- List of Supreme Court of Canada cases (McLachlin Court)
