= Intervener =

An intervener is a person who regularly works one-to-one with an individual who is deaf-blind. Deafblindness is a low incidence disability that describes individuals with varying degrees of vision and hearing losses. The combined loss often compromises the ability to access information in the environment or to communicate effectively. Interveners, by contributing communication and information, provide a medium through which deaf-blind individuals can link to the people, things and events in the world. Interveners provide services in educational settings for students, as well as in early intervention and community settings. The improvement of the social and emotional well-being of individuals with disabilities, is the goal of interveners.

== Practice ==
In educational settings, interveners, through the provision of intervener services, provide access to information and communication and facilitate the development of social and emotional well-being for children who are deaf-blind. An interventer is typically a paraeducator who has received specialized, in-depth training in deaf-blindness and works one-to-one with an infant, child, or youth. The intervener serves as a member of the student's educational team. Working under the guidance and direction of a student's classroom teacher or another individual responsible for ensuring the implementation of the student's IEP, an intervener's primary roles are to:

- provide consistent access to instruction and environmental information that is usually gained by typical students through vision and hearing, but that is unavailable or incomplete to an individual who is deaf-blind;
- provide access to and/or assist in the development and use of receptive and expressive communication skills;
- facilitate the development and maintenance of trusting, interactive relationships that promote social and emotional well-being; and,
- provide support to help a student form relationships with others and increase social connections and participation in activities.

== Development of intervener services in the US ==
The concept of intervener services for individuals who are deaf-blind arose in Canada in the 1970s, and has been developing as a practice in the U. S. over the past two decades. In that time, significant efforts across the U.S. have improved the availability of intervener services for children who are deaf-blind. Since 2002, there has been a U.S. national intervener task force that has developed educational resources, including materials that raise awareness of intervener services and guidelines for intervener competencies. Families have educated policymakers about the role of interveners and the beneficial impact an intervener can have on the education of a child who is deaf-blind. State deaf-blind projects, part of the system of federal supports for deaf-blind students, have developed creative ways to train interveners and support them in classrooms. Formal and informal collaborations are leading towards the development of a stronger national infrastructure to support this practice. Currently, a national set of recommendations, a national set of competencies for training interveners, national training modules and a national association are part of a strong foundation for promoting quality intervention services for individuals with deaf-blindness.

== See also ==
- Deaf culture
- Independent living
- Support worker
- Disability
