= Jameel Jaffer =

Canadian civil rights lawyer

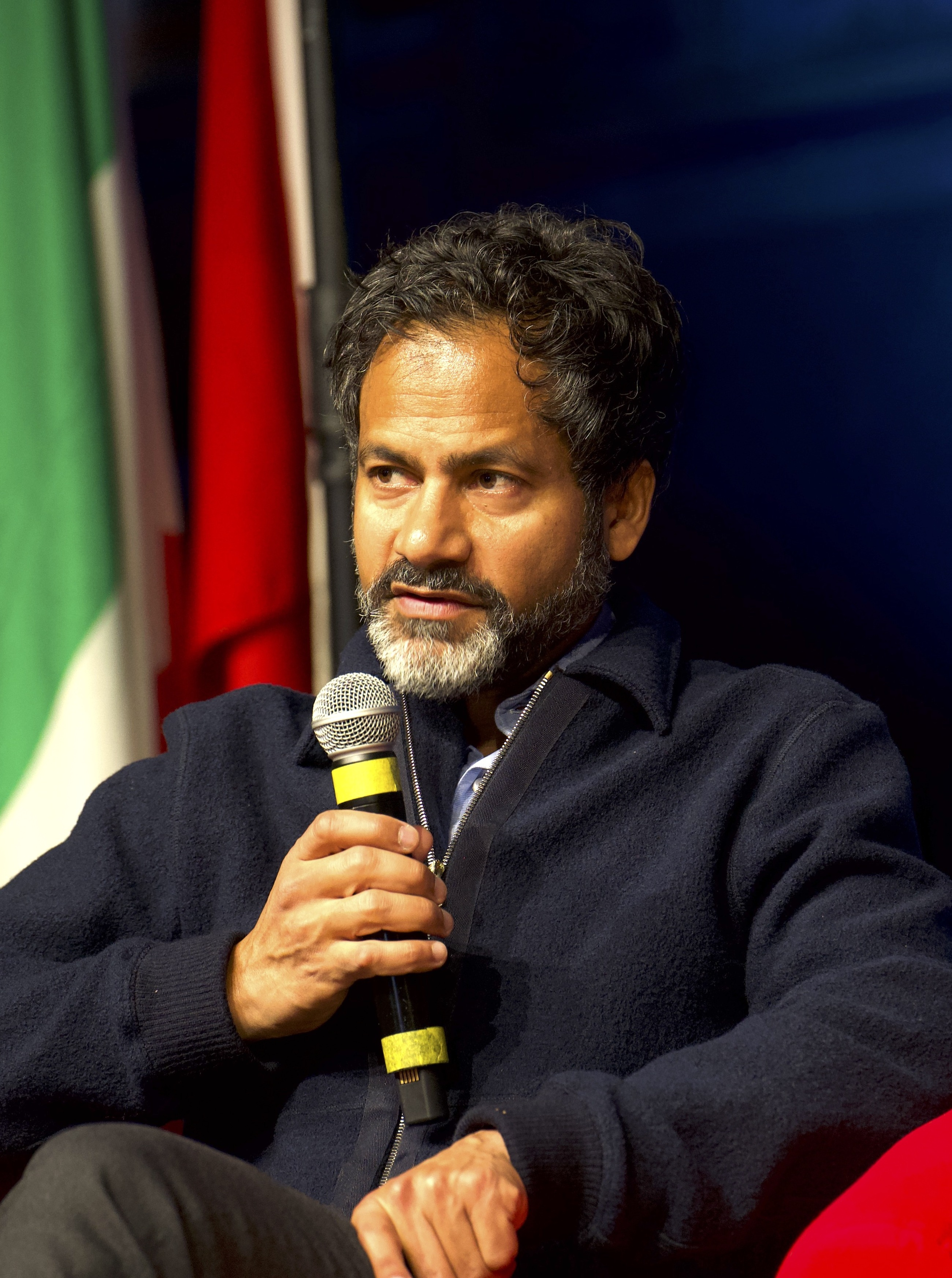
- Jaffer at the International Journalism Festival in 2024
- Born: 1971 (age 54–55)
- Education: Williams College (BA); University of Cambridge (MPhil); Harvard University (JD)
- Occupation: Lawyer
- Known for: Human rights work

Jameel Jaffer is a Canadian and American human rights and civil liberties attorney and the inaugural director of the Knight First Amendment Institute at Columbia University, which was created by Columbia University and the John S. and James L. Knight Foundation to defend the freedoms of speech and the press in the digital age. The Institute engages in "strategic litigation, research, policy advocacy, and public education," and is notable for major legal victories relating to free speech online, government transparency, and the First Amendment rights of non-citizens. It has also published influential papers about free speech and new technology, including the paper that led Jack Dorsey, then the CEO of Twitter, to launch Bluesky.

Jaffer was previously Deputy Legal Director at the American Civil Liberties Union and Director of the ACLU's Center for Democracy. In that role, he litigated major cases involving civil liberties and human rights after 9/11, including cases about surveillance, secrecy, censorship, detention, interrogation, and extrajudicial killing. He is particularly notable for litigation under the Freedom of Information Act that exposed the torture of prisoners held at the Guantanamo Bay detention camp and in CIA black sites. The New York Times billed the lawsuit "one of the most successful in the history of public disclosure."

Jaffer is an Executive Editor of Just Security, a national security blog. He has also written for the New York Times, the New York Review of Books, the Guardian, and the London Review of Books.

== Early life and education ==
Jaffer's family is of Indo-Tanzanian descent; his father's side is from Zanzibar while his mother's side is from Dar es Salaam. His family follow the Isma'ilism sect of Islam, although Jaffer does not describe himself as religious.

Jaffer grew up in Canada and is a graduate of Upper Canada College, a private school in Toronto. Jaffer received his bachelor's degree from Williams College in 1994, his master's degree from the University of Cambridge in 1996, and his Juris Doctor degree from Harvard Law School in 1999, where he was an editor of the Harvard Law Review. After graduating from Harvard, Jaffer served as a law clerk to Judge Amalya L. Kearse on the United States Court of Appeals for the Second Circuit and then to the Rt. Hon. Beverley McLachlin, the then-Chief Justice of Canada.

== Honors and awards ==
In 2026, the Sidney Hillman Foundation awarded Jaffer the George Barrett Award for Public Interest Law, citing the Knight Institute's "prominent and influential defense of democratic freedoms against the encroachment of authoritarianism." Brooklyn Law School awarded him the Distinguished Commitment to Public Service Award in April 2026. Williams College awarded Jaffer a Bicentennial Medal in 2025. Jaffer was the honoree at the Harvard Law Review's annual gala in 2022.

== Community events ==
Jaffer was invited to celebrate Ramadan at the White House in 2009.
