= R v O.N.E. =

Canadian legal case concerning publication ban

- Supreme Court of Canada

Hearing: 2001: June 18; Judgment: 2001: November 15.
- Full case name: Vancouver Sun v. Her Majesty The Queen, O.N.E. and the Attorney General of Canada
- Citations: [2001] SCC 77, [2001] 3 SCR 478
- Docket No.: 28190
- Prior history: APPEAL from SUPREME COURT OF BRITISH COLUMBIA
- Ruling: Appeal allowed

Court membership
- Chief Justice: Beverley McLachlin; Puisne Justices: Claire L'Heureux-Dubé, Charles Gonthier, Frank Iacobucci, John C. Major, Michel Bastarache, Ian Binnie, Louise Arbour, Louis LeBel

Reasons given
- Unanimous reasons by: Yes
- Majority: Iacobucci J.

R v O.N.E. was a legal case heard in 2001 before the Supreme Court of Canada. It was an appeal against a ban on publication of details of the police investigation of a murder case. The appeal was allowed.

== Finding ==
Judge Iacobucci J. wrote for a unanimous Court that the appeal raised substantially similar issues to those considered by the Court in R v Mentuck. He concluded that the publication ban sought should not have been ordered by the trial judge in light of the appropriate common law test for a publication ban. The appeal was therefore allowed. The publication ban, which was varied by the Court, was declared effective for a period of one year following the release of this judgment, because by that time, the operations in which the police officers were then involved should be completed.
