= The British North American Act =

Canadian psychedelic rock band

- Origin: Montreal, Quebec, Canada
- Genres: Psychedelic rock
- Years active: 1968 - 1972
- Labels: Now Records
- Past members: Andy Bator; Bob Allen; Dave McCall; Rick Elger; Kirk Armstrong

The British North American Act was a Canadian psychedelic rock band formed in Montreal, Quebec, in 1968. The group recorded one studio album, In the Beginning, in 1969 which included their song "Joe Cool", a moderate hit on the Canadian charts. Although the album languished in obscurity for many years, retrospectively it fetches high asking prices and has been reissued.

== History ==
Adopting the name of the British statute which created Canada in 1867, the band came together with Andy Bator (keyboards), Bob Allen (lead guitar), Dave McCall (drums), Rick Elger (rhythm guitar), and Kirk Armstrong (bass guitar). Formed in Montreal, the group members were not all native Canadians, but actually a majority of immigrants: Allen and Elger were from England, while Bator hailed from Hungary.

After performing on the local music scene for about a year, infusing light folk with psychedelic rock, the British North American Act was signed by Now Records. Label executives arranged for the group to dress itself in revolutionary uniforms, hopefully to duplicate the success of the attire enjoyed by Paul Revere and the Raiders. The band recorded their only studio album, In the Beginning..., later in the year. Clocking in at under 30 minutes, the album featured soft rock songs while experimenting with distortion and raw garage music. A single taken from the album, "Joe Cool", became a moderate success in Canada, peaking just outside the Top 40 of the music charts.

In the early 1970s, Now Records went bankrupt; the British North American Act disbanded soon after. The group's music began to resurface in 1987 when In the Beginning... was reissued for the first time. Original copies of the album, a rarity to find, garnered as much as $1,000 asking prices. In 2004, the album was released on CD for the first time by Akarma Records.
