= Reasons of the Supreme Court of Canada by Justice Cromwell =

This is a list of all the reasons written by Thomas Cromwell during his tenure as puisne justice of the Supreme Court of Canada.

== 2009 ==
- R v Strecko , 2009 SCC 2, [2009] 1 S.C.R. 64
- R v Middleton, 2009 SCC 21 (Dissent)
- R v Van, 2009 SCC 22 (Dissent)
- R v Godin, 2009 SCC 26 (Majority)
- R v Layton, 2009 SCC 36, [2009] 2 S.C.R. 540 (Dissent)
- Galambos v Perez, 2009 SCC 48, [2009] 3 S.C.R. 247 (Unanimous)
- R v Burke, 2009 SCC 57, [2009] 3 S.C.R. 566 (Dissent)

== 2010 ==
Statistics

XXXXX	Majority or Plurality	XXX	Concurrence	XXXX	Other
XXXX	Dissent	XXXX	Concurrence/dissent	Total =	XXXXXX
Written opinions = XXX		Oral opinions = XXX		Unanimous decisions = XXX

Case name	Issue	Co-authored by	Joined by
XXX; CITATIONS [URL]	XXX	XXX	XXX
XXX; CITATIONS [URL]	XXX	XXX	XXX

== 2011 ==
Statistics

XXXXX	Majority or Plurality	XXX	Concurrence	XXXX	Other
XXXX	Dissent	XXXX	Concurrence/dissent	Total =	XXXXXX
Written opinions = XXX		Oral opinions = XXX		Unanimous decisions = XXX

Case name	Issue	Co-authored by	Joined by
R v Miljevic; 2011 SCC 8	Whether trial judge erred in response to jury's questions	–	Abella, Charron and Rothstein JJ
Kerr v Baranow; 2011 SCC 10	Family law — Whether the monetary remedy for unjust enrichment is restricted to quantum meruit award — Whether evidence of joint family venture should be considered in conferring the remedy — Whether evidence of common intention should be considered in context of resulting trust	–	Unanimous
Dubé v Canada; 2011 SCC 39	Whether the interest earned on bank deposits by a status Indian is exempt from income taxation as personal property "situated on a reserve" under the Indian Act	–	McLachlin CJ and Binnie, Fish and Charron JJ
Bastien Estate v Canada; 2011 SCC 38	Whether the interest earned on bank deposits by a status Indian is exempt from income taxation as personal property "situated on a reserve" under the Indian Act	–	McLachlin CJ and Binnie, Fish and Charron JJ
R v JMH; 2011 SCC 45	Whether the trial judge's allegedly foaled assessment of the evidence constituted an error of law allowing the appellate review of the accused's acquittal	–	Unanimous
R v Côté; 2011 SCC 46	Standard of review of a trial judge's determination of what would bring the administration of justice into disrepute for the purpose of determining whether to exclude evidence under s. 24(2) of the Charter	–	McLachlin CJ and Binnie, LeBel, Fish, Abella, Charron and Rothstein JJ
R v Barros; 2011 SCC 51	Whether investigator hired by the defence is bound by informer privilege — Whether trial judge committed errors of law allowing appellate review of acquittals for offences of obstructing justice and extortion	–	–
British Columbia (Workers' Compensation Board) v Figliola; 2011 SCC 52	The appropriate scope of a human rights tribunal's discretion to determine whether the substance of a complaint has been "appropriately dealt with" when two bodies share jurisdiction over human rights	–	McLachlin CJ and Binnie and Fish JJ
Canada (Canadian Human Rights Commission) v Canada (AG); 2011 SCC 53	Whether standard of reasonableness applies to a human rights tribunal's decision to award costs, and whether the tribunal made a reviewable error in awarding costs to the complainant — Whether federal human rights tribunal has jurisdiction to award costs	LeBel J	Unanimous
R v Sarrazin; 2011 SCC 54	Whether the potential verdict of attempted murder should have been left with the jury by the trial judge	–	Deschamps and Rothstein JJ
Alberta (Information and Privacy Commissioner) v Alberta Teachers' Association; 2011 SCC 61	Whether a matter that was not raised at a tribunal may be judicially reviewed — Whether a tribunal's decision relating to the interpretation of its home statute or statutes closely connected to its functions is reviewable on a standard of reasonableness or correctness	–	–
RP v RC; 2011 SCC 65	Husband applying to terminate spousal support order on basis of his retirement and the market downturn, and whether the husband had established there had been a material change in circumstances since the original support order	–	McLachlin CJ
LMP v LS; 2011 SCC 64	The proper approach to an application for variation of spousal support order under section 17(4.1) of the Divorce Act where support terms of agreement have been incorporated into an order	–	–

== 2012 ==
Statistics

6	Majority or Plurality	0	Concurrence	0	Other
4	Dissent	1	Concurrence/dissent	Total =	11
Written opinions = 11		Oral opinions = 0		Unanimous decisions = 5

Case name	Issue	Co-authored by	Joined by
Merck Frosst Canada Ltd v Canada (Health); 2012 SCC 3	Access to third-party information and notice requirements under the federal Access to Information Act	–	McLachlin CJ and Binnie, LeBel, Fish and Charron JJ
Richard v Time Inc; 2012 SCC 8	Consumer protection and false or misleading representations under the Quebec Consumer Protection Act	LeBel J	Unanimous
Halifax (Regional Municipality of) v Nova Scotia (Human Rights Commission); 2012 SCC 10	Judicial review and standard of review of Nova Scotia Human Rights Commission decision	–	Unanimous
R v Roy; 2012 SCC 26	Whether proof of actus reus without more can support inference that required objective mens rea element is present; Offence of dangerous operation of motor vehicle and whether accused's conduct displayed a marked departure from the standard of care	–	Unanimous
Annapolis County District School Board v Marshall; 2012 SCC 27	Tort of negligence and contributory negligence	–	–
Halifax (Regional Municipality of) v Canada (Public Works and Government Services); 2012 SCC 29 [URL]	Standard of review of Minister of Public Works and Government Services' discretion to determine "property value" for purposes of making payments in lieu of taxes	–	Unanimous
Canada (AG) v Downtown Eastside Sex Workers United Against Violence Society; 2012 SCC 45	Public interest group and individual working on behalf of sex workers initiating a constitutional challenge to prostitution provisions of the Criminal Code, and whether the public interest group and individual should be granted public interest standing	–	Unanimous
R v Boudreault; 2012 SCC 56	Offence of care or control of motor vehicle while impaired, and whether risk of danger is an essential element of care or control offences	–	–
R v St-Onge Lamoureaux; 2012 SCC 57	Constitutional challenge on the statutory amendments affecting evidence that can be adduced to rebut the presumption of accuracy	–	Rothstein J
R v Dineley; 2012 SCC 58	Whether amendments brought to Criminal Code during accused's trial limiting the evidence that may be adduced in defence to raise a doubt about the reliability of breathalyzer tests have retrospective effect to the time of the alleged offence	–	McLachlin CJ and Rothstein J
Reference re Broadcasting Regulatory Policy CRTC 2010-167 and Broadcasting Order CRTC 2010-168; 2012 SCC 68	Whether the Canadian Radio-television and Telecommunications Commission has jurisdiction under the federal Broadcast Act to implement a policy empowering private local television stations to negotiate direct compensation for retransmission of signals by cable and satellite companies, as well as the right to prohibit such undertakings from retransmitting those signals if negotiations are unsuccessful	Abella J	Deschamps and Karakatsanis JJ

== 2013 ==
2013 statistics

10	Majority or Plurality	2	Concurrence	0	Other
3	Dissent	0	Concurrence/dissent	Total =	15
Written opinions = 15		Oral opinions = 0		Unanimous decisions = 6

Case name	Issue	Co-authored by	Joined by
R v Ryan; 2013 SCC 3	Criminal defence of duress	LeBel J	McLachlin CJ and Deschamps, Abella, Rothstein, Moldaver and Karakatsanis JJ
Sun Indalex Finance, LLC v United Steelworkers; 2013 SCC 6	Pensions and bankruptcy and insolvency	–	McLachlin CJ and Rothstein J
R v Named Person B 2013 SCC 9	Informer privilege and evidence	–	Rothstein J
Antrim Truck Centre Ltd v Ontario (Transportation); 2013 SCC 13	Compensation for expropriation and the tort of nuisance	–	Unanimous
R v TELUS Communications Co; 2013 SCC 16	Whether the general warrant power under s. 487.01 of the Criminal Code can authorize prospective production of future text messages from telecommunications service provider's database	–	McLachlin CJ
Penner v Niagara (Regional Police Services Board); 2013 SCC 19	Issue estoppel: administrative tribunal proceedings and civil proceedings	Karakatsanis J	McLachlin CJ and Fish J
R v WH; 2013 SCC 22	Reasonableness of trial verdict	–	Unanimous
R v ADH; 2013 SCC 28	Whether the mens rea for the offence of child abandonment under s. 214 of the Criminal Code is subjective or objective	–	McLachlin CJ and Fish, Abella and Karakatsanis JJ
Envision Credit Union v Canada; 2013 SCC 48	Taxation – Amalgamating credit unions seeking to avoid flow-through of certain tax attributes to double claim capital cost allowance and reset preferred rate amount	–	–
R v Vu; 2013 SCC 60	Unreasonable search and seizure and exclusion of evidence under ss. 8 and 24(2) of the Charter	–	Unanimous
Alberta (Information and Privacy Commissioner) v United Food and Commercial Workers, Local 401; 2013 SCC 62	Whether legislation restricting the collection, use and disclosure of personal information under the Personal Information Protection Act violates expressive rights under s. (b) of the Charter	Abella J	Unanimous
R v McRae; 2013 SCC 68	Offence of uttering threats	Karakatsanis J	Unanimous
AIC Ltd v Fischer; 2013 SCC 69	Civil procedure – Certification of class actions	–	Unanimous
IBM Canada Ltd v Waterman; 2013 SCC 70	Employment law – Whether pension benefits should be deducted from damages for wrongful dismissal	–	LeBel, Fish, Abella, Moldaver, Karakatsanis and Wagner JJ
Wood v Schaeffer; 2013 SCC 71	Whether police officers have right to consult with counsel before making notes on an incident; Whether police officers are entitled to basic legal advice as to the nature of rights and obligations in connection with an incident	LeBel J	Fish J

== 2014 ==
Statistics

16	Majority or Plurality	2	Concurrence	0	Other
0	Dissent	1	Concurrence/dissent	Total =	19
Written opinions = 15		Oral opinions = 4		Unanimous decisions = 9

Case name	Issue	Co-authored by	Joined by
AI Enterprises Ltd v Bram Enterprises Ltd; 2014 SCC 12	Tort of unlawful interference with economic relations	–	Unanimous
Bernard v Canada (AG); 2014 SCC 13	Judicial review of labour arbitration decisions	Abella J	LeBel, Karakatsanis and Wagner JJ
R v Hutchinson; 2014 SCC 19	Offence of sexual assault and consent	McLachlin CJ	Rothstein and Wagner JJ
Reference Re Supreme Court Act, ss 5 and 6; 2014 SCC 21	Eligibility requirements to the Supreme Court of Canada	McLachlin CJ and LeBel, Abella, Karakatsanis and Wagner JJ	–
Peracomo Inc v TELUS Communications Co; 2014 SCC 29	Maritime law and tort liability	–	McLachlin CJ and Rothstein and Karakatsanis JJ
Ontario (Community Safety and Correctional Services) v Ontario (Information and Privacy Commissioner); 2014 SCC 31	Access to information and exemptions under the Freedom of Information and Protection of Privacy Act	Wagner J	Unanimous
Canada (Citizenship and Immigration) v Harkat; 2014 SCC 37	Constitutionality of the security certificate scheme of the Immigration and Refugee Protection Act under s. 7 of the Charter	Abella J	–
R v Spencer; 2014 SCC 43	Privacy and unreasonable search and seizure under s. 8 of the Charter	–	Unanimous
R v Sipos; 2014 SCC 47	Long-term offender designations	–	Unanimous
R v Hart; 2014 SCC 52	Admissibility of "Mr. Big" confessions	–	–
Trial Lawyers Association of British Columbia v British Columbia (AG); 2014 SCC 59	Access to justice and the constitutionality of hearing fees under ss. 92(14) and 96 of the Constitution Act, 1867	–	–
R v Conception; 2014 SCC 60	Mental disorders and dispositions by a court or review board	Rothstein J	LeBel, Abella and Gascon JJ
R v Mohamed; 2014 SCC 63	Search and seizure and right to counsel under ss. 8 and 10(b) of the Charter	–	Unanimous (oral)
R v Bouchard; 2014 SCC 64	Appropriateness of jury charge on defence of provocation	–	Unanimous (oral)
R v Lepine; 2014 SCC 65	Appropriateness of jury charge	–	Unanimous (oral)
Thibodeau v Air Canada; 2014 SCC 67	Breach of language rights during international flight and conflicting legislation	–	McLachlin CJ and LeBel, Rothstein and Karakatsanis JJ
Bhasin v Hrynew; 2014 SCC 71	Contractual duty of good faith and honest performance	–	Unanimous
R v Fearon; 2014 SCC 77	Unreasonable search and seizure and search incident to arrest under s. 8 of the Charter	–	McLachlin CJ and Moldaver and Wagner JJ
R v MacLeod; 2014 SCC 76	Appropriate charge to jury on offences of second degree murder and manslaughter	–	Unanimous (oral)

== 2015 ==
Statistics

10	Majority or Plurality	2	Concurrence	0	Other
1	Dissent	0	Concurrence/dissent	Total =	13
Written opinions = 13		Oral opinions = 0		Unanimous decisions = 4

Case name	Issue	Co-authored by	Joined by
Canada (AG) v Federation of Law Societies of Canada; 2015 SCC 7	Whether Proceeds of Crime (Money Laundering) and Terrorist Financing Act, as it applies to the legal profession, infringes the right to be free from unreasonable search and seizure and the right not to be deprived of liberty otherwise in accordance with principles of fundamental justice under ss. 8 and 7 of the Charter, respectively	–	LeBel, Abella, Karakatsanis and Wagner JJ
Potter v New Brunswick Legal Aid Services Commission; 2015 SCC 10	Whether administrative suspension constitutes a unilateral act amounting to a breach of contract via constructive dismissal; Whether pension benefits should be deducted from damages for wrongful dismissal	–	McLachlin CJ
Quebec (AG) v Canada (AG); 2015 SCC 14	Whether federal legislation abolishing the long-gun registry also containing provision requiring the destruction of long-gun registration data is ultra vires the criminal law power of Parliament under s. 91(27) of the Constitution Act, 1867	Karakatsanis J	McLachlin CJ and Rothstein and Moldaver JJ
Carey v Laiken; 2015 SCC 17	Whether an intent to interfere with the administration of justice is required to prove civil contempt of court	–	Unanimous
White Burgess Langille Inman v Abbott and Haliburton Co; 2015 SCC 23	Expert opinion evidence, independence and impartiality and whether the elements of an expert's duty to the court go to admissibility of evidence rather than simply its weight	–	Unanimous
R v Kokopenace; 2015 SCC 28	Appropriate legal test for representativeness on jury roll; Jury representativeness under ss. 11(d) and (f) and 15 of the Charter	–	McLachlin CJ
Strickland v Canada (AG); 2015 SCC 37	Whether provincial superior courts have jurisdiction to address validity of federal child support guidelines	–	McLachlin CJ and Rothstein, Moldaver, Karakatsanis, Gascon and Côté JJ
Guindon v Canada; 2015 SCC 41	Whether proceedings under s. 163.2 of the Income Tax Act imposing monetary penalties on every person who makes a false statement that could be used by another person for purposes under that Act are criminal in nature or lead to the imposition of true penal consequences; Whether an individual assessed for same penalties is a person "charged with an offence" within the meaning of s. 11 of the Charter	Rothstein J	Moldaver and Gascon JJ
R v Moriarty; 2015 SCC 55	Whether provisions under the National Defence Act permitting federal offences to be prosecuted within the military justice system in relation to everyone subject to Code of Service Discipline, regardless of the circumstances in which offences were committed, are broader than necessary to achieve their purpose, in violation of s. 7 of the Charter	–	Unanimous
Caron v Alberta; 2015 SCC 56	Whether provincial Languages Act is ultra vires or inoperative insofar that by requiring provincial laws and regulates to be enacted, printed and published in English only, it abrogates the constitutional duty owed by Alberta to enact, print and publish its laws and regulations in both English and French in Rupert's Land and North-Western Territory Order (1870)	Karakatsanis J	McLachlin CJ and Rothstein, Moldaver and Gascon JJ
Canadian Imperial Bank of Commerce v Green; 2015 SCC 60	Limitation period of class actions	–	–
MM v United States of America; 2015 SCC 62	Whether extradition judge applied the correct principles in relation to double criminality and to own role in assessing the reliability and sufficiency of evidence; Whether extradition judge should consider evidence about possible defences and other exculpating circumstances in deciding whether to commit for extradition; Whether Minister of Justice gave appropriate consideration to the defence of necessity available under Canadian law but not available under the law of the requesting state; Whether Minister of Justice's decision to surrender for extradition was reasonable	–	McLachlin CJ and Moldaver and Wagner JJ
R v Riesberry; 2015 SCC 65	Whether a horse race constituted a "game" for the purposes of offence of cheating at pay	–	Unanimous

== 2016 ==
2016 statistics

6	Majority or Plurality	3	Concurrence	0	Other
1	Dissent	2	Concurrence/dissent	Total =	12
Written opinions = 11		Oral opinions = 1		Unanimous decisions = 3

Case name	Issue	Co-authored by	Joined by
Carter v Canada (AG); 2016 SCC 4	Motion seeking an order extending the suspension of the declaration of constitutional invalidity issued in Carter v Canada (AG), 2015 SCC 5	McLachlin CJ and Moldaver and Brown JJ	–
R v Gagnon; 2016 SCC 6	Arbitrary detention and exclusion of evidence	–	Unanimous (oral)
R v Borowiec; 2016 SCC 11	Offence of infanticide	–	Unanimous
R v DLW; 2016 SCC 22	Offence of bestiality	–	McLachlin CJ and Moldaver, Karakatsanis, Côté and Brown JJ
R v Williamson; 2016 SCC 28	Right to be tried within a reasonable time under s. 11 of the Charter	–	Wagner and Gascon JJ
R v Jordan; 2016 SCC 27	Right to be tried within a reasonable time under s. 11 of the Charter	–	McLachlin CJ and Wagner and Gascon JJ
Wilson v Atomic Energy of Canada Ltd; 2016 SCC 29	Unjust dismissal of non-unionized employees under the Canada Labour Code	–	–
R v Villaroman; 2016 SCC 33	Whether trial judge erred in his analysis of circumstantial evidence by requiring that an inference supporting a conclusion other than guilt be based on evidence rather than on a lack of evidence	–	Unanimous
Ledcor Construction Ltd v Northbridge Indemnity Insurance Co; 2016 SCC 37	Property insurance and contract interpretation	–	–
Endean v British Columbia; 2016 SCC 42	Jurisdiction of class actions	–	McLachlin CJ and Abella, Moldaver, Gascon, Côté and Brown JJ
Mennillo v Intramodal inc 2016 SCC 51	Reasonable expectations of shareholders	–	Abella, Karakatsanis, Wagner, Gascon and Brown JJ
Alberta (Information and Privacy Commissioner) v University of Calgary; 2016 SCC 53	Privacy, production of documents and solicitor–client privilege	–	–

== 2017 ==
2017 statistics

1	Majority or Plurality	0	Concurrence	0	Other
0	Dissent	0	Concurrence/dissent	Total =	1
Written opinions = 1		Oral opinions = 0		Unanimous decisions = 0

Case name	Issue	Co-authored by	Joined by
Ernst v Alberta Energy Regulator; 2017 SCC 1	Freedom of expression and Charter damages	–	Karakatsanis, Wagner and Gascon JJ

* Note: This table is complete up until April 3, 2013

|} |} |} |} |} |} |} |}
