= Reasons of the Supreme Court of Canada by Justice Deschamps =

This is a list of all the opinions written by Marie Deschamps during her tenure as puisne justice of the Supreme Court of Canada.

== 2003 ==
Marie Deschamps 2003 statistics

3	Majority or Plurality	1	Concurrence	0	Other
4	Dissent	3	Concurrence/dissent	Total =	11
Written opinions = ?		Oral opinions = ?		Unanimous opinions = ?

Case name	Issue	Co-authored by	Joined by
Markevich v. Canada [2003] 1 S.C.R. 94; 2003 SCC 9	Income tax	None	Gonthier J.
Caisse populaire Desjardins de Val-Brillant v. Blouin [2003] 1 S.C.R. 666; 2003 SCC 31	Movable hypothec; Quebec Civil Code	None	Binnie and LeBel JJ.
Trociuk v. British Columbia (Attorney General) [2003] 1 S.C.R. 835; 2003 SCC 34	Equality rights; vital statistics; Charter	None	Unanimous
Wewaykum Indian Band v. Canada [2003] 2 S.C.R. 259; 2003 SCC 45	Reasonable apprehension of bias; Supreme Court judgments	McLachlin C.J. and Gonthier, Iacobucci, Major, Bastarache, Arbour and LeBel JJ.	None
Doucet-Boudreau v. Nova Scotia (Minister of Education) [2003] 3 S.C.R. 3; 2003 SCC 62	Remedy and enforcement of Charter breaches	LeBel J.	Major and Binnie JJ.
National Trust Co. v. H & R Block Canada Inc. [2003] 3 S.C.R. 160; 2003 SCC 66	Bulk sales; commercial law	None	LeBel J.
Maranda v. Richer [2003] 3 S.C.R. 193; 2003 SCC 67	Searching lawyer's office; solicitor-client privilege	None	None
Quebec (Commission des droits de la personne et des droits de la jeunesse) v. Maksteel Québec Inc. [2003] 3 S.C.R. 228; 2003 SCC 68	Charter; discrimination based on criminal record	None	Gonthier, Iacobucci, Binnie, Arbour and LeBel JJ.
R. v. Wu [2003] 3 S.C.R. 530; 2003 SCC 73	Conditional sentencing	None	None
R. v. Malmo-Levine; R. v. Caine [2003] 3 S.C.R. 571; 2003 SCC 74	Charter; security of person; equality rights; federalism; criminalization of marijuana	None	None
R. v. Clay [2003] 3 S.C.R. 735; 2003 SCC 75		None	None

== 2004 ==
Marie Deschamps 2004 statistics

7	Majority or Plurality	0	Concurrence	0	Other
3	Dissent	2	Concurrence/dissent	Total =	12
Written opinions = ?		Oral opinions = ?		Unanimous opinions = ?

Case name	Issue	Co-authored by	Joined by
Giguère v. Chambre des notaires du Québec [2004] 1 S.C.R. 3; 2004 SCC 1	Professional liability	None	None
Canadian Foundation for Children, Youth and the Law v. Canada (Attorney General) [2004] 1 S.C.R. 76; 2004 SCC 4	Charter sections 7 and 15; spanking	None	None
Townsend v. Kroppmanns [2004] 1 S.C.R. 315; 2004 SCC 10	Tort damages	None	Unanimous
Hartshorne v. Hartshorne [2004] 1 S.C.R. 550; 2004 SCC 22	Marriage contracts; family assets; maintenance	None	Binnie and LeBel JJ.
Bank of Nova Scotia v. Thibault [2004] 1 S.C.R. 758; 2004 SCC 29	Statutory interpretation; trusts	None	Unanimous
Banque nationale de Paris (Canada) v. 165836 Canada Inc. [2004] 2 S.C.R. 45; 2004 SCC 37	Default; Quebec Civil Code	None	Bastarache J.
R. v. Mann [2004] 3 S.C.R. 59; 2004 SCC 52	Charter; search and seizure; police investigatory powers	None	Bastarache J.
Monsanto Canada Inc. v. Ontario (Superintendent of Financial Services) [2004] 3 S.C.R. 152; 2004 SCC 54	Pensions; judicial review	None	Unanimous
Côté v. Rancourt [2004] 3 S.C.R. 248; 2004 SCC 58	Lawyer conflict of interest	None	Unanimous
Glykis v. Hydro-Québec [2004] 3 S.C.R. 285; 2004 SCC 60	Interruption of public services	None	McLachlin C.J. and Bastarache and Binnie JJ.
Entreprises Sibeca Inc. v. Frelighsburg (Municipality) [2004] 3 S.C.R. 304; 2004 SCC 61	Municipal zoning and immunity	None	McLachlin C.J. and Bastarache and Binnie JJ.
Peoples Department Stores Inc. (Trustee of) v. Wise [2004] 3 S.C.R. 461; 2004 SCC 68	Director liability; duty of care	Major J.	Unanimous

== 2005 ==
Marie Deschamps 2005 statistics

7	Majority or Plurality	0	Concurrence	0	Other
3	Dissent	0	Concurrence/dissent	Total =	10
Written opinions = ?		Oral opinions = ?		Unanimous opinions = ?

	Case name	Issue	Co-authored by	Joined by
	Chaoulli v. Quebec (Attorney General) [2005] 1 S.C.R. 791; 2005 SCC 35	Charter; security of person; private health insurance	None	None
	Mugesera v. Canada (Minister of Citizenship and Immigration) [2005] 2 S.C.R. 100; 2005 SCC 40	Judicial review; deportation; crimes against humanity	McLachlin C.J. and Major, Bastarache, Binnie, LeBel, Fish and Charron JJ.	None
	D.I.M.S. Construction inc. (Trustee of) v. Quebec (Attorney General) [2005] 2 S.C.R. 564; 2005 SCC 52	Bankruptcy	None	Unanimous
o	Moufarrège v. Quebec (Deputy Minister of Revenue) [2005] 2 S.C.R. 598; 2005 SCC 53	Income tax	None	Unanimous
	Reference re Employment Insurance Act (Can.), ss. 22 and 23 [2005] 2 S.C.R. 669; 2005 SCC 56	Unemployment insurance; maternity benefits	None	Unanimous
	Hilewitz v. Canada (Minister of Citizenship and Immigration); De Jong v. Canada (Minister of Citizenship and Immigration) [2005] 2 S.C.R. 706; 2005 SCC 57	Immigration; inadmissibility due to health	None	LeBel J.
	Montréal (City) v. 2952-1366 Québec Inc. [2005] 3 S.C.R. 141; 2005 SCC 62	Charter; Freedom of expression	McLachlin C.J.	Bastarache, LeBel, Abella and Charron JJ.
	Merk v. International Association of Bridge, Structural, Ornamental and Reinforcing Iron Workers, Local 771 [2005] 3 S.C.R. 425; 2005 SCC 70	Whistleblower protection	None	None
	R. v. Boucher [2005] 3 S.C.R. 499; 2005 SCC 72	Breathalizer evidence	None	McLachlin C.J. and Major, Bastarache and Abella JJ.
	Dikranian v. Quebec (Attorney General) [2005] 3 S.C.R. 530; 2005 SCC 73	Student loan repayment plan	None	None

== 2006 ==
Marie Deschamps 2006 statistics

4	Majority or Plurality	1	Concurrence	0	Other
2	Dissent	0	Concurrence/dissent	Total =	7
Written reasons = ?		Oral reasons = ?		Unanimous reasons = ?

Case name	Issue	Co-authored by	Joined by
Isidore Garon ltée v. Tremblay; Fillion et Frères (1976) inc. v. Syndicat national des employés de garage du Québec inc. [2006] 1 S.C.R. 27; 2006 SCC 2	Labour arbitration	None	Bastarache, Binnie and Charron JJ.
Multani v. Commission scolaire Marguerite-Bourgeoys; 1 S.C.R. _; 2006 SCC 6	Religious freedom; section 2 of Charter; judicial review	Abella J.	None
R. v. Lavigne; 1 S.C.R. _; 2006 SCC 10	Crime proceeds	None	Unanimous
H.J. Heinz Co. of Canada Ltd. v. Canada (Attorney General); 1 S.C.R. _; 2006 SCC 13	Access to information	None	Binnie, Fish and Abella JJ.:
R. v. Gagnon _ S.C.R. _; 2006 SCC 17	Reasons for judgment	Fish J.	None
Buschau v. Rogers Communications Inc. 2006 SCC 28	Pension law	None	LeBel, Fish and Abella JJ.
GMAC Commercial Credit Corporation - Canada v. T.C.T. Logistics Inc. 2006 SCC 35	Bankruptcy	None	None
Fédération des producteurs acéricoles du Québec v. Regroupement pour la commercialisation des produits de l'érable inc., 2006 SCC 50; 2006 SCC 50	Bankruptcy in Quebec	None	Unanimous
Pro Swing Inc. v. Elta Golf Inc. 2006 SCC 52	Conflict of laws; enforcement of non-monetary judgments	None	LeBel, Fish and Abella JJ.
R. v. Morris; 2006 SCC 59	Aboriginal treaty rights	Abella J.	Binnie and Charron JJ.

== 2010 ==
Statistics

XXXXX	Majority or Plurality	XXX	Concurrence	XXXX	Other
XXXX	Dissent	XXXX	Concurrence/dissent	Total =	XXXXXX
Written opinions = XXX		Oral opinions = XXX		Unanimous decisions = XXX

Case name	Issue	Co-authored by	Joined by
XXX; CITATIONS [URL]	XXX	XXX	XXX
XXX; CITATIONS [URL]	XXX	XXX	XXX

== 2011 ==
Statistics

XXXXX	Majority or Plurality	XXX	Concurrence	XXXX	Other
XXXX	Dissent	XXXX	Concurrence/dissent	Total =	XXXXXX
Written opinions = XXX		Oral opinions = XXX		Unanimous decisions = XXX

Case name	Issue	Co-authored by	Joined by
Canadian Broadcasting Corp v The Queen; 2011 SCC 3	Broadcasting bans	–	Unanimous
Canadian Broadcasting Corp v Canada (AG); 2011 SCC 2	Whether measures of practice and directive issued by the Ministère de la Justice limiting filming, taking photographs and conducting interviews to predetermined locations and prohibiting broadcasting of official audio recordings of hearings infringes freedom of expression under s. 2(b) of the Charter — Whether a directive meets "prescribed by law" requirement of s. 1 of the Charter	–	Unanimous
Smith v Alliance Pipeline Ltd; 2011 SCC 7	Standard of review for Pipeline Arbitration Committee appointed pursuant to the National Energy Board Act	–	–
Bou Malhab v Diffusion Métromédia CMR inc 2011 SCC 9	Whether the representative plaintiff in a class action for defamation must prove that each group member suffered personal injury	–	McLachlin CJ and Binnie, LeBel, Charron and Rothstein JJ
Seidel v TELUS Communications Inc; 2011 SCC 15	Whether provincial legislation, stating that contractual agreements to waive or release rights, benefits or protects under the legislation area void, renders an arbitration clause in a standard form cell phone contract void	LeBel J	Abella and Charron JJ
Ontario (AG) v Fraser; 2011 SCC 20	Whether separate labour relations legislation governing agricultural workers in Ontario infringes freedom of association under s. 2(d) of the Charter by failing to establish a meaningful process of collective bargaining	–	–
i Trade Finance Inc v Bank of Montreal; 2011 SCC 26	Role of personal property security legislation — Whether finance company has right to recover disputed funds on basis of advances made under mistake of fact, constructive trust or equitable lien — Whether pledge to bank creates a statutory enforceable security interest — Whether bank is a bona fide purchaser for value without notice	–	Unanimous
Canada Trustco Mortgage Co v Canada; 2011 SCC 36	Whether a bank is liable to make payments to a tax debtor when receiving cheques payable to a tax debtor for deposit in an account held jointly by the tax debtor and a third party	–	Binnie, Rothstein and Cromwell JJ
Dubé v Canada; 2011 SCC 39	Whether the interest earned on bank deposits by a status Indian is exempt from income taxation as personal property "situated on a reserve" under the Indian Act	–	Rothstein J
Bastien Estate v Canada; 2011 SCC 38	Whether the interest earned on bank deposits by a status Indian is exempt from income taxation as personal property "situated on a reserve" under the Indian Act	–	Rothstein J
R v Côté; 2011 SCC 46	Standard of review of a trial judge's determination of what would bring the administration of justice into disrepute for the purpose of determining whether to exclude evidence under s. 24(2) of the Charter	–	–
Crookes v Newton; 2011 SCC 47	Tort of libel and slander — Whether a hyperlink to an allegedly defamatory article in itself constitutes a publication	–	–
R v Whyte; 2011 SCC 49	Whether conduct of police violated ss. 8 and 9 of the Charter	–	Unanimous (oral)
Quebec (AG) v Canada (Human Resources and Social Development); 2011 SCC 60	Whether provincial legislation providing that income replacement benefits received by injured worker be exempt from seizure is constitutionally inoperative in relation to garnishment scheme created by federal Employment Insurance Act — Whether federal Employment Insurance Commission, as an agent of the Crown, is protected by common law immunity such that the provincial legislation is inapplicable to the federal Crown	–	Unanimous

== 2012 ==
Statistics

9	Majority or Plurality	0	Concurrence	0	Other
1	Dissent	0	Concurrence/dissent	Total =	10
Written opinions = 9		Oral opinions = 1		Unanimous decisions = 1

Case name	Issue	Co-authored by	Joined by
Merck Frosst Canada Ltd v Canada (Health); 2012 SCC 3	Access to third-party information and notice requirements under the federal Access to Information Act	–	Abella and Rothstein JJ
R v TLM; 2012 SCC 6	Admissibility of similar fact evidence	–	Unanimous (oral)
SL v Commission scolaire des Chênes; 2012 SCC 7	Whether refusal of school board to exempt children from ethics and religious culture course infringed freedom of religion under s. 2(a) of the Charter	–	McLachlin CJ and Binnie, Abella, Charron, Rothstein and Cromwell JJ
R v RP; 2012 SCC 22	Reasonableness of trial verdict	–	Abella, Cromwell, Moldaver and Karakatsanis JJ
Annapolis County District School Board v Marshall; 2012 SCC 27	Tort of negligence and contributory negligence	–	McLachlin CJ and Abella, Rothstein, Moldaver and Karakatsanis JJ
R v Gibbons; 2012 SCC 28	Offence of contempt of court and section 127 of the Criminal Code	–	McLachlin CJ and LeBel, Abella, Rothstein, Cromwell, Moldaver and Karakatsanis JJ
R v Punko; 2012 SCC 39	Issue estoppel	–	McLachlin CJ and Rothstein, Cromwell, Moldaver and Karakatsanis JJ
R v St-Onge Lamoureaux; 2012 SCC 57	[DESCRIPTION]	–	McLachlin CJ and LeBel, Fish and Abella JJ
R v Dineley; 2012 SCC 58	Whether amendments brought to Criminal Code during accused's trial limiting the evidence that may be adduced in defence to raise a doubt about the reliability of breathalyzer tests have retrospective effect to the time of the alleged offence	–	LeBel, Fish and Abella JJ
Newfoundland and Labrador v AbitibiBowater Inc; 2012 SCC 67	Bankruptcy and insolvency and whether the federal Companies' Creditors Arrangement Act is ultra vires by permitting courts to determine whether an environmental order is a monetary claim	–	Fish, Abella, Rothstein, Cromwell, Moldaver and Karakatsanis JJ

== 2013 ==
2013 statistics

1	Majority or Plurality	0	Concurrence	0	Other
0	Dissent	1	Concurrence/dissent	Total =	2
Written opinions = 2		Oral opinions = 0		Unanimous decisions = 0

Case name	Issue	Co-authored by	Joined by
Quebec (AG) v A 2013 SCC 5	Discrimination based on marital status under s. 15(1) of the Charter	–	Cromwell and Karakatsanis JJ
Sun Indalex Finance, LLC v United Steelworkers; 2013 SCC 6	Pensions and bankruptcy and insolvency	–	Moldaver J
