= Sean Harrington =

Sean Harrington or Seán Harrington may refer to:

- Seán Harrington (Irish republican) (1900–1976), IRA member from Dublin
- Seán Harrington (Chief of Staff) (1912–1978), Chief of Staff of the IRA
- Sean J. Harrington (born 1944), Canadian judge
- Sean Harrington (basketball), 2002–03 Illinois Fighting Illini basketball player
