= Newfoundland and Labrador v AbitibiBowater Inc =

- Supreme Court of Canada

Hearing: November 16, 2011 Judgment: December 7, 2012
- Full case name: Her Majesty The Queen in Right of the Province of Newfoundland and Labrador v AbitibiBowater Incorporated, Abitibi‑Consolidated Incorporated, Bowater Canadian Holdings Incorporated, Ad Hoc Committee of Bondholders, Ad Hoc Committee of Senior Secured Noteholders and U.S. Bank National Association (Indenture Trustee for the Senior Secured Noteholders)
- Citations: 2012 SCC 67
- Docket No.: 33797
- Prior history: APPEAL from a judgment of the Quebec Court of Appeal (Chamberland JA), 2010 QCCA 965, dismissing the appellant’s motion for leave to appeal a decision of Gascon JSC, 2010 QCCS 1261
- Ruling: Appeal dismissed

Holding
- A claim may be asserted in CCAA insolvency proceedings, even if it is contingent on an event that has not yet occurred

Court membership
- Chief Justice: Beverley McLachlin; Puisne Justices: Louis LeBel, Marie Deschamps, Morris Fish, Rosalie Abella, Marshall Rothstein, Thomas Cromwell, Michael Moldaver, Andromache Karakatsanis

Reasons given
- Majority: Deschamps J
- Dissent: McLachlin CJ
- Dissent: LeBel J

Laws applied
- Companies' Creditors Arrangement Act

Newfoundland and Labrador v AbitibiBowater Inc, 2012 SCC 67 is a ruling by the Supreme Court of Canada dealing with whether an obligation incurred under regulatory action constitutes a claim under the Companies' Creditors Arrangement Act, thus becoming subject to a stay of proceedings.

== Background ==
AbitibiBowater, a pulp and paper manufacturer, operated throughout the province of Newfoundland and Labrador for over a century. The company closed its paper mill in Stephenville, in 2005, and, in 2008, it announced its last operating mill, in Grand Falls-Windsor, would close in March 2009. This marked the end of the company’s active operations in the province. However, Abitibi still retained numerous property rights, assets and undertakings within Newfoundland amounting to well over $300 million. This included interests in hydroelectric facilities, surface rights and paper mills.

The company closed its paper mill in Stephenville in 2005 and announced in 2008 it would also close its plant in Grand Falls-Windsor. The Newfoundland and Labrador House of Assembly promptly passed legislation expropriating AbitibiBowater's assets in the province. This included the cancellation of "water and hydroelectric contracts and agreements" between the province and Abitibi, the cancellation of ongoing legal proceedings Abitibi had against the province and the blocking of access to Newfoundland's courts by Abitibi.

The government later learned it had accidentally expropriated the former mill property in central Newfoundland — and its environmental liabilities — as well. The province issued remediation orders against Abitibi under the Environmental Protection Act, compelling Abitibi to clean up various sites, many of them expropriated under the Abitibi Act. Abitibi had to submit a remediation plan by January 15, 2010, and the cleanup or "remediation actions" were to be completed by January 15, 2011.

Before the EPA orders were issued, Abitibi filed for protection from its creditors under the Companies' Creditors Arrangement Act (CCAA), and an initial stay order and subsequent extension order were both granted by the court. The extension order included an amendment to the initial stay order stating that the stay order would not apply to government regulatory orders.

Newfoundland argued that the EPA orders were non-monetary, and thus were not within the scope of the creditor claims process under the CCAA. It also sought a declaration that a court did not have the constitutional competence under CCAA proceedings to fetter the discretion of a Minister of a provincial Crown under a law validly enacted by that province.

== The courts below ==
The application was dismissed by the Superior Court of Quebec. In his decision, Gascon JSC held that the EPA orders were in substance financial or monetary in nature, and were thus not exempted from the stay order previously issued. As he noted:

:[174] With all due respect, this is not regulatory in nature; it is rather purely financial in reality. This is, in fact, closer to a debtor-creditor relationship than anything else.

[175] This is quite far from the situation of the detached regulator or public enforcer issuing order for the public good. Here, the Province itself derives the direct pecuniary benefit from the required compliance of Abitibi to the EPA Orders. The Province stands to directly gain in the outcome. None of the cases submitted by the Province bear any similarity to the fact pattern in the present proceedings.

[176] From this perspective, it is the hat of a creditor that best fits the Province, not that of a disinterested regulator. Between the suggestion that the Province is merely seeking compliance with the EPA and the inference that it is rather looking to ascertain a monetary value and financial benefit through the execution in nature of its EPA Orders, the Court prefers the latter view based on the evidence as a whole.

The Province then appealed the decision to the Quebec Court of Appeal, stating that:

- The judge of first instance disregarded the principles of federalism
- Provincial legislation operates in the insolvency context
- The CCAA cannot be interpreted to give a judge the power to immunize Abitibi from compliance with the EPA Orders or to avoid the Abitibi Act

The Court of Appeal disagreed, and supported the trial judge's contention that:

[It] boils down to claiming that a provincial regulator could have the non-reviewable right to determine whether obligations it controls or creates will be subject to compromise under the CCAA or whether they will enjoy a super-priority beyond the reach of compromise.

Accordingly, there was no prima facie merit to the appeal envisaged by the Province, and leave to appeal was refused.

The Province appealed to the Supreme Court of Canada, and the following constitutional questions were posed:

1. Is the definition of “claim” in s. 2(1) of the Companies' Creditors Arrangement Act ultra vires the Parliament of Canada or constitutionally inapplicable to the extent this definition includes statutory duties to which the debtor is subject pursuant to s. 99 of the Environmental Protection Act?
2. Is s. 11 of the Companies’ Creditors Arrangement Act ultra vires the Parliament of Canada or constitutionally inapplicable to the extent this section gives courts jurisdiction to bar or extinguish statutory duties to which the debtor is subject pursuant to s. 99 of the Environmental Protection Act?
3. Is s. 11 of the Companies’ Creditors Arrangement Act ultra vires the Parliament of Canada or constitutionally inapplicable to the extent this section gives courts jurisdiction to review the exercise of ministerial discretion under s. 99 of the Environmental Protection Act?

== Decision of the SCC ==
The SCC ruled 7–2 that the appeal should be dismissed.

=== Majority opinion ===
In her ruling, Deschamps J held that not all orders issued by regulatory bodies are monetary in nature and thus provable claims in an insolvency proceeding, but some may be, even if the amounts involved are not quantified at the outset of the proceedings. There are three requirements that must be met for orders to be considered claims:

- there must be a debt, a liability or an obligation to a creditor
- the debt, liability or obligation must be incurred as of a specific time
- it must be possible to attach a monetary value to the debt, liability or obligation

The first two were met in this case, but the dispute was with respect to the third, and the question was whether orders that are not expressed in monetary terms can be translated into such terms. A claim may be asserted in insolvency proceedings even if it is contingent on an event that has not yet occurred. The criterion used by courts to determine whether a contingent claim will be included in the insolvency process is whether the event that has not yet occurred is too remote or speculative. In that regard, certain indicators are available to a court to determine whether there is a provable claim in a CCAA proceeding:

- whether the activities are ongoing,
- whether the debtor is in control of the property
- whether the debtor has the means to comply with the order, and
- the CCAA court may also consider the effect that requiring the debtor to comply with the order would have on the insolvency process.

In this case, it was sufficiently certain that the Province would perform remediation work and therefore fall within the definition of a creditor with a monetary claim. As Deschamps J observed:

:[41] Nor does subjecting the orders to the insolvency process amount to issuing a licence to pollute, since insolvency proceedings do not concern the debtor’s future conduct. A debtor that is reorganized must comply with all environmental regulations going forward in the same way as any other person. To quote the colourful analogy of two American scholars, "Debtors in bankruptcy have — and should have — no greater license to pollute in violation of a statute than they have to sell cocaine in violation of a statute."

[42] Furthermore, corporations may engage in activities that carry risks. No matter what risks are at issue, reorganization made necessary by insolvency is hardly ever a deliberate choice. When the risks materialize, the dire costs are borne by almost all stakeholders. To subject orders to the claims process is not to invite corporations to restructure in order to rid themselves of their environmental liabilities.

Because the provisions on the assessment of claims in insolvency matters relate directly to Parliament’s jurisdiction, the ancillary powers doctrine is not relevant to this case. The interjurisdictional immunity doctrine is also inapplicable, because a finding that a claim of an environmental creditor is monetary in nature does not interfere in any way with the creditor’s activities; its claim is simply subject to the insolvency process. As Deschamps J explained:

:[19] What the Province is actually arguing is that courts should consider the form of an order rather than its substance. I see no reason why the Province’s choice of order should not be scrutinized to determine whether the form chosen is consistent with the order’s true purpose as revealed by the Province’s own actions. If the Province’s actions indicate that, in substance, it is asserting a provable claim within the meaning of federal legislation, then that claim can be subjected to the insolvency process. Environmental claims do not have a higher priority than is provided for in the CCAA. Considering substance over form prevents a regulatory body from artificially creating a priority higher than the one conferred on the claim by federal legislation. This Court recognized long ago that a province cannot disturb the priority scheme established by the federal insolvency legislation. Environmental claims are given a specific, and limited, priority under the CCAA. To exempt orders which are in fact monetary claims from the CCAA proceedings would amount to conferring upon provinces a priority higher than the one provided for in the CCAA.

=== Dissenting opinions ===
McLachlin CJ held that there was no “likelihood approaching certainty” that the Province would remediate the contamination itself, and therefore — except with respect to one site — the orders for remediation in this case are not claims that can be compromised. Otherwise, she agreed with the majority decision with respect to the issues relating to the division of powers.

LeBel J disagreed with McLachlin CJ's use of the "likelihood approaching certainty" test, saying he preferred Deschamps J's "sufficient certainty" test instead, as it best reflects how both the common law and the civil law view and deal with contingent claims. Applying that test, the appeal should be allowed on the basis that there is no evidence that the Province intends to perform the remedial work itself.

== Impact ==
Newfoundland and Labrador v AbitibiBowater Inc, together with Sun Indalex Finance, LLC v United Steelworkers, were high-profile cases involving the application of the CCAA that the SCC was considering in its 2012–2013 term.

The ruling acknowledged the polluter pays principle but said in this case it did not give the province any special status that would move it ahead of other creditors. Friends of the Earth observed that the end result would be that taxpayers will bear much of the financial and environmental costs associated with cleaning up a polluter’s industrial sites, unless remediation orders are issued and acted upon before a company goes under. Provincial Environment Minister Tom Hedderson said the province must still do assessments for any necessary cleanups.

While the SCC did make it clear that as soon as a regulator initiates enforcement mechanisms it becomes a creditor for the purposes of an insolvency proceeding, it still left unresolved several difficult questions:

- what happens to the obligation to remediate if the environmental damage is of a type that is continuing during the insolvency proceeding and will continue after it?
- what if the remediation costs greatly exceed the value of the real property even after it is remediated?
