= Companies' Creditors Arrangement Act =

Canadian Act of Parliament

Parliament of Canada
- Long title: An Act to facilitate compromises and arrangements between companies and their creditors
- Citation: SC 1932‑33, c. 36 (now RSC 1985, c. C-36)
- Territorial extent: Canada
- Enacted by: Parliament of Canada
- Enacted: 1933

Amended by
- SC 1952‑53, c. 3; SC 1990, c. 17; SC 1997, c. 12; SC 1998, c. 30; SC 2000, c. 30; SC 2001, c. 34; SC 2005, c. 47; SC 2007, c. 29; SC 2007, c. 36

Related legislation
- Related Provisions (English); Dispositions connexes (French)

The Companies' Creditors Arrangement Act (CCAA; French: Loi sur les arrangements avec les créanciers des compagnies) is a statute of the Parliament of Canada that allows insolvent companies owing their creditors more than $5 million in total to restructure their businesses and financial affairs.

== The CCAA within the Canadian insolvency regime ==
In 1990, the British Columbia Court of Appeal discussed the background behind the introduction of the CCAA in one of its rulings:

The CCAA was enacted by Parliament in 1933 when the nation and the world were in the grip of an economic depression. When a company became insolvent liquidation followed because that was the consequence of the only insolvency legislation which then existed - the Bankruptcy Act and the Winding-Up Act. Almost inevitably liquidation destroyed the shareholders' investment, yielded little by way of recovery to the creditors, and exacerbated the social evil of devastating levels of unemployment. The government sought, through the CCAA, to create a regime whereby the principals of the company and the creditors could be brought together under the supervision of the court to attempt a reorganization or compromise or arrangement under which the company could continue in business.

The Supreme Court of Canada did not have a chance to explain the nature of the CCAA until the groundbreaking case of Century Services Inc. v. Canada (Attorney General) in 2010. In that case, the Court gave a detailed explanation of the nature of insolvency law in Canada.

The Bankruptcy and Insolvency Act (BIA) provides a more rules-based approach for resolving a corporate debtor's insolvency, which must be observed strictly. The CCAA, on the other hand, provides a more discretionary approach that is remedial in nature, which therefore must be broadly construed.

Although the CCAA was originally enacted in 1933, extensive use of it only began in the economic downturn of the early 1980s. Recent legislative amendments of the BIA and CCAA have served to harmonize key aspects, such as the use of single proceedings, a common priority of claims structure, and encouraging reorganization over liquidation.

=== Discretionary power of the court in a CCAA reorganization ===
The legislation is remedial in the purest sense in that it provides a means whereby the devastating social and economic effects of bankruptcy or creditor initiated termination of ongoing business operations can be avoided while a court-supervised attempt to reorganize the financial affairs of the debtor company is made.

— - Elan Corp. v. Comiskey, 1990 CanLII 6979, 1 OR (3d) 289 (2 November 1990), Court of Appeal (Ontario, Canada), per Doherty J.A., dissenting

This is noted together with s. 11 of the CCAA, which states that a court may, "subject to the restrictions set out in this Act, . . . make any order that it considers appropriate in the circumstances".

The decision notes the interrelated nature of proceedings under the CCAA and BIA:

[77] The CCAA creates conditions for preserving the status quo while attempts are made to find common ground amongst stakeholders for a reorganization that is fair to all. Because the alternative to reorganization is often bankruptcy, participants will measure the impact of a reorganization against the position they would enjoy in liquidation. In the case at bar, the order fostered a harmonious transition between reorganization and liquidation while meeting the objective of a single collective proceeding that is common to both statutes.

== Application of the Act ==
=== Eligibility ===
The scope of the CCAA is quite broad. It applies to any debtor company (or group of affiliated companies) that owes more than $5 million, other than:

- banks
- insurance companies
- trust and loan companies
- telegraph companies

and:

- is either bankrupt or insolvent
- has committed an act of bankruptcy under the Bankruptcy and Insolvency Act ("BIA") or is deemed insolvent under the Winding-Up and Restructuring Act ("WRA"), whether or not proceedings have been initiated under either of those Acts
- has made an assignment, or has been made subject to a bankruptcy order, under the BIA, or
- is being wound up under the WRA

=== Debtor protection ===
No person may terminate or amend — or claim an accelerated payment or forfeiture of the term under — any agreement, including a security agreement, with any debtor company subject to the CCAA by reason only that proceedings commenced under the CCAA or that the company is insolvent.

Agreements can be assigned or disclaimed by the debtor company as a result of the proceeding, by following prescribed procedures. These provisions extend beyond being used only within restructuring plans, and the courts have held that there is "no reason…why the same analysis cannot apply during a sale process that requires the business to be carried as a going concern", In that regard:

- there is no requirement that a plan of compromise or arrangement be imminent
- the court will take into account whether refusing a disclaimer would have the effect of enhancing the position of the counter-party
- whether a counter-party would suffer significant financial hardship if the disclaimer is allowed is a subjective test

=== Approval of the compromise or arrangement ===
Negotiated compromises and arrangements may deal with any matter, including claims against directors and amendments to the articles of incorporation or letters patent incorporating the company. When they have been approved by each participating class of creditors (by a two-thirds vote by value of the claims involved) the court may then approve it, and it will be binding on all persons, including trustees in bankruptcy.

They cannot be approved by the court if provision is not made for settling "super-priority" claims (as they are known under the BIA) relating to:

- compensation and reimbursement claims by employees other than officers and directors
- pension plan contributions (except where agreement has been reached with the relevant pension regulator)
- source deductions due on employee withholdings

In addition, no amounts relating to "equity claims" may be authorized by the court under a compromise or arrangement until all other claims are first paid in full. "Equity claims" have been held to include any claims shareholders may have against third parties in certain circumstances.

== Powers of the court ==
Any interested person may apply to the court for an order under the Act. This is normally the debtor company, but a creditor can also do so. The court having jurisdiction is the superior court for the province in which the company's head office or chief place of business in Canada, or, in the absence of that, where any of its assets are situated.

When the application is made, the court is required to appoint a monitor with respect to the business and financial affairs of the company, who must be a trustee in bankruptcy under the Bankruptcy and Insolvency Act. The monitor is required to investigate and report back to the court on the company, advise the court with respect to any actions that need to be taken, and to carry out any other functions in relation to the company that the court may direct.

Where a compromise or arrangement has already been negotiated with the secured or unsecured creditors — essentially creating a pre-packaged insolvency — the court may summarily order that it proceed to be voted on by each class of creditors concerned, and, where necessary, by the shareholders as well. Whether a creditor is secured or unsecured is governed by the BIA.

However, the court is not bound to accept an application under the Act, and it can terminate previously granted orders (and even declare them to have been void ab initio) where an applicant has not made full and fair disclosure of all material facts. Where a petition for CCAA relief appears to be more like a defensive tactic than a bona fide attempt to restructure, it may prefer to order receivership instead.

=== Stay of proceedings ===
Where no such compromise or arrangement has been negotiated, the court, on application, may issue an order, lasting for 30 days,

- staying,
- restraining from continuing, or
- prohibiting from commencing,

any proceedings against the debtor company, while negotiations are held to secure a compromise or arrangement with creditors and shareholders. The court may extend the protection for any period it sees fit. A stay may be lifted upon application to the court, but only in very restricted circumstances:

- it will be difficult for a secured party to obtain relief where the effect of doing so would be to prevent the debtor from continuing to carry on business
- however, lifting a stay may be more possible in a liquidating CCAA proceeding, having regard for the need to balance stakeholder interests

Provision is made for such stays not affecting investigations undertaken by any regulatory body (other than with respect to any payment that may be ordered), but the court can order the cancellation of such exemption where:

- a viable compromise or arrangement could not otherwise be made in respect of the company, and
- it is not contrary to the public interest that the regulatory body be affected by such order

However, as noted in Newfoundland and Labrador v. AbitibiBowater Inc., not all payments required under regulatory orders constitute claims under the CCAA and are thus subject to stay. Subsequent jurisprudence suggests that determining the status of such orders will be case-specific.

=== Scope ===
In addition, the court has broad discretion in administering any other issues that may arise. As the Act says,

...the court, on the application of any person interested in the matter, may ... make any order that it considers appropriate in the circumstances.

This has allowed for very creative applications for resolving difficult scenarios, including:

- the packaging and orderly resolution of holdings of asset-backed commercial paper by multiple investors, which can include the release of claims against third parties who are themselves solvent and not creditors of the debtor company
- dealing with limited partnerships managed by an insolvent general partner
- arranging for disposal of the company through a stalking horse offer
- providing a more effective way for arranging merger and acquisition transactions involving distressed companies
- administering the liquidation of the company
- declining to approve restructuring plans, either because they are poorly conceived or contrary to the best interests of the parties concerned

=== Stability during proceedings ===
In order to assure that the company's operations will continue during the proceedings, the court has the power to declare that the assets of the company are subject to a security or charge with respect to certain matters, and may further order that such charges rank ahead of those of secured creditors. These include:

- arrangements similar to debtor-in-possession financing for sustaining the company's operations (also known as a "DIP charge")
- payments to specified suppliers for continuing to provide goods or services that are critical to the company's operation
- indemnification for directors and officers for actions done after the commencement of proceedings, where appropriate insurance coverage is not in effect.
- security (known as an "administration charge") for fees and expenses of the monitor and any other specified financial, legal or other experts.

This "super priority" status is construed broadly, and has been held to even defeat statutory deemed trusts (such as those concerning pension plan deficiencies and vacation pay that exist in Ontario), as well as in rem claims such as maritime liens that are found in maritime law.

=== Other powers ===
The court may also order:

- the removal of directors if they are unreasonably impairing (or likely to unreasonably impair) the possibility of a viable compromise or arrangement being made in respect of the company, or are acting (or likely to act) inappropriately as a director in the circumstances.
- recovery of amounts arising from fraudulent preferences and undervalue transactions
- the coordination of its proceedings with corresponding foreign proceedings

== Comparison of CCAA with bankruptcy protection proceedings ==
The CCAA has been described as being similar in nature to Chapter 11 proceedings in the United States and to administration proceedings and company voluntary arrangements ("CVAs") in the United Kingdom. Differences between the various proceedings include the following highlights:

Action	CCAA (Canada)	Chapter 11 (US)	Administration (UK)	CVA (UK)
Applicable to	Insolvent companies (or affiliated groups) with debts greater than $5 million	Any debtor	Any company that is or is likely to become unable to pay its debts	Any company, whether insolvent or not
Initiated by	Insolvent company (or creditor), upon application to the court	Insolvent person (whether natural or a business entity), upon application to the court OR creditors of a business entity, upon showing of cause to the court	Company, its directors, or a holder of a floating charge (either unilaterally or on application to the court), or any other creditor (on application to the court)	The directors of a company
Scope of plan	Within the court's discretion	As prescribed by law	As proposed by the administrator and approved at a meeting of the company's creditors	As proposed by the directors and approved at meetings of the company and of its creditors, and then approved by the court
Stay of proceedings	Upon order of the court	Automatic upon filing	May be lifted in specific cases with consent of administrator or permission of the court	If requested by the directors to the court
Debtor-in-possession financing	Allowed	Allowed	Not available	Not available

== Notable CCAA proceedings ==
- AbitibiBowater
- Air Canada
- Canwest
- Carillion
- Green Relief
- GuestLogix
- HFI Flooring Inc
- Hudson's Bay
- JTI-Macdonald Corp.
- Kitco
- Laurentian University
- Mountain Equipment Co-op
- Nortel Networks
- Quadriga Fintech Solutions
- Quebecor World
- Sino-Forest Corporation
- Stelco
- Target Canada

== Relevant cases ==
- Reference re constitutional validity of the Companies Creditors Arrangement Act, 1934 CanLII 72, [1934] SCR 659 (6 June 1934)
- Century Services Inc. v. Canada (Attorney General), 2010 SCC 60, [2010] 3 SCR 379 (16 December 2010)
- Sun Indalex Finance, LLC v. United Steelworkers, 2013 SCC 6, [2013] 1 SCR 271 (1 February 2013)
- Newfoundland and Labrador v. AbitibiBowater Inc., 2012 SCC 67, [2012] 3 SCR 443 (7 December 2012)
