= HFI =

HFI may refer to:

== Businesses and organisations ==
- HFI Flooring Inc, a Canadian company
- Hamfest India, an amateur radio convention
- Handball Federation of India, governing body for handball in India
- Holy Family Institute

== Government ==
- Healthy Forests Initiative, a US federal law
- Horizontal fiscal imbalance, in macroeconomics
- Human Freedom Index, in human rights

== Other uses ==
- High Frequency Instrument, aboard the Planck spacecraft
- Human factors integration, in engineering
- Hereditary fructose intolerance, a metabolic deficiency
