= Peracomo Inc v TELUS Communications Co =

- Supreme Court of Canada

Hearing: 15 November 2013 Judgment: 23 April 2014
- Full case name: Peracomo Inc, Réal Vallée, the owners and all other persons having an interest in the fishing vessel “Realice” and the fishing vessel "Realice" v TELUS Communications Company, Hydro-Québec, Bell Canada and Royal & Sun Alliance Insurance Company of Canada
- Citations: 2014 SCC 29
- Docket No.: 34991
- Prior history: APPEAL from Peracomo Inc. v. Société Telus Communications, 2012 FCA 199 (29 June 2012), affirming Société Telus Communications v. Peracomo Inc., 2011 FC 494 (27 April 2011)
- Ruling: Appeal allowed in part, Wagner J dissenting in part

Holding
- While liability in the present case was capped by the Convention (as the damage was not caused by intentional or reckless conduct), insurance coverage was void because the applicable standard of "wilful misconduct" was met.

Court membership
- Chief Justice: Beverley McLachlin; Puisne Justices: Louis LeBel, Rosalie Abella, Marshall Rothstein, Thomas Cromwell, Michael Moldaver, Andromache Karakatsanis, Richard Wagner

Reasons given
- Majority: Cromwell J, joined by McLachlin CJ and Rothstein and Karakatsanis JJ
- Concur/dissent: Wagner J
- LeBel, Abella and Moldaver JJ took no part in the consideration or decision of the case.

Laws applied
- Marine Insurance Act (S.C. 1993, c. 22); Marine Liability Act (S.C. 2001, c. 6); Convention on Limitation of Liability for Maritime Claims

Peracomo Inc v TELUS Communications Co [2014] 1 S.C.R. 621, 2014 SCC 29 is a decision of the Supreme Court of Canada concerning the law of marine insurance, which also has international impact.

== Background ==
Réal Vallée is a good man; a decent man; an honest man—a fisherman. However he did a very stupid thing. He cut the plaintiffs’ submarine fibre-optic cable in two. It cost them almost $1,000,000 to repair it.

— Harrington J, opening his judgment at Federal Court

In 1999, QuébecTel (subsequently acquired by Telus), in conjunction with Hydro-Québec, laid two fibre-optic cables across the Saint Lawrence River:

- Sunoque I, from Point-au-Père to Baie-Comeau, and
- Sunoque II, from Le Bic to Forrestville.

In June 2006, Réal Vallée, a local fisherman engaged in snow crab and whelk fishing (Note: in an area of the St. Lawrence River known as Zone 17) aboard the catamaran Realice, had strung a series of cages on the river bottom, secured at both ends by small anchors attached to buoys. One of these anchors got snagged onto the cable. The anchor with the cable attached was hauled out of the water, and Vallée freed it by cutting the cable with an electric saw. Several days later, the same thing happened and he cut the cable again. He had done so, believing that the cable had been abandoned (according to a handwritten note on a map he had seen at a local museum). (Note: "After the fishing season, he was visiting Église Saint-George, a deconsecrated church in Baie-Comeau, which is now a museum. He saw there a chart with a line drawn across the river in the area where he usually fished. The word "abandonné" was written thereon by hand. Without giving it a second thought, he concluded that this was what he was hooking with his anchor. He only glanced at it for a matter of seconds and cannot recall whether it was a marine chart, a topographical chart, or indeed what type of map it was at all.") Remote monitoring controls operated by Telus indicated that the Sunoque I parted about 8.9 kilometres (4.8 nautical miles) off Baie-Comeau.

Telus, Hydro-Québec, and Bell Canada (which had a right of use of the cable), shared the cost of repair in accordance with a pre-existing contract among them. When Vallée learned of the repairs that were being undertaken, he consulted a lawyer, notified his underwriters (who promptly denied coverage), and made a voluntary statement to the police. He was later charged with committing mischief by wilfully damaging property exceeding $5,000 in value, and was subsequently acquitted.

Telus and Hydro-Québec commenced an action in the Federal Court of Canada:

- in personam against Peracomo Inc. (the owner of the Realice) and Vallée, and
- in rem against the ship.

The defendants also instituted third party proceedings against their underwriters, Royal and Sun Alliance Insurance Company of Canada in order to regain their insurance cover.

== The courts below ==
At the Federal Court:

- The defendants were found to have joint and several liability for the damage, with the plaintiffs being awarded damages and interest amounting to about $1.21 million.
- The defendants’ third party action was dismissed.
- Costs were awarded in favour of the plaintiffs and the third party against the defendants.

Harrington J, in his ruling, found that:

- the appellants were liable in negligence for damaging the cable because Vallée had breached his common law duty of care and statutory duty to be aware of the submarine cables in the areas in which he fished.
- Peracomo Inc. was liable for Mr. Vallée’s actions, not only vicariously, but also personally.
- Vallée did not own or consult any of the maritime charts of Zone 17, as required under Canadian law.
- while the Marine Liability Act provided for liability to be capped at $500,000 for property damage caused by ships similar in size to the Realice, art. 4 of the Convention on Limitation of Liability for Maritime Claims provides that the cap does not apply where a loss resulted from a person’s intentional or reckless conduct. (Note: "If recklessness is in issue, and I think it is not, Mr. Vallée was reckless in the extreme.")
- coverage of the loss through the appellants' insurance policy was excluded by the Marine Insurance Act, (Note: similar in scope to the English Marine Insurance Act 1906) because cutting the cable fell within the statutory exclusion from marine liability insurance for "wilful misconduct".

The Federal Court of Appeal affirmed the ruling. In his ruling, Létourneau JA also held that, under existing precedent, (Note: ADGA Systems International Ltd. v. Valcom Ltd., 1999 CanLII 1527, 43 OR (3d) 101 (12 January 1999), Court of Appeal (Ontario, Canada), following principles derived from London Drugs Ltd. v. Kuehne & Nagel International Ltd., 1992 CanLII 41, [1992] 3 SCR 299 (29 October 1992)) employees, officers and directors will be held personally liable for tortious conduct causing property damage even when their actions are pursuant to their duties to the corporation. In addition, the Convention contemplates such scenarios.

Vallée appealed to the Supreme Court of Canada, and leave to appeal was granted in January 2013.

== At the Supreme Court ==
In a 4-1 ruling, the appeal was allowed in part. In relation to the appellants’ limitation of liability, the appeal was allowed with costs but including only one-half of their costs of the leave application. The appellants’ joint and several liability is limited by the Convention. In relation to the claim against the insurer, the appeal was dismissed with costs including its costs of the leave application. In his ruling, Cromwell J held that:

1. Corporate personality is not a relevant consideration in this case, since Vallée was personally negligent in cutting the cable. Therefore, the company was liable as a result of his acts, not the other way around. The courts below were correct in holding Vallée personally liable.
2. The Federal Court of Appeal gave a narrow interpretation to the intent requirement under art. 4 of the Convention, effectively stating that all that was required to break the limit on liability is knowledge that one is interfering with property. Such an approach undermines the Convention’s purpose to establish a virtually unbreakable limit on liability and does not accord with its text.
3. While the threshold to break liability under the Convention requires intention or recklessness with knowledge that the loss will probably occur, wilful misconduct under the Marine Insurance Act does not require either intention to cause the loss or subjective knowledge that the loss will probably occur. In that regard, "wilful misconduct" has a different meaning under Canadian maritime law than it does under the Civil Code of Quebec. Accordingly, the appellants’ loss is excluded from insurance coverage.

=== Dissent ===
While agreeing with Cromwell J that the Convention applied so as to limit liability, Wagner J believed that the relevant provision of the Marine Insurance Act must be read harmoniously with the Convention's provisions, and would have therefore allowed the appeal in its entirety, with costs. Both the provisions at issue require proof of the same fact: that the insured had knowledge of the harmful consequences of his or her act, and intended or was reckless with regard to those consequences. The fact that a reasonable person ought to have known or that a person had a duty to know, does not suffice to characterize the misconduct as willful. (Note: "...this proposition is consistent with the English cases, according to which misconduct will be characterized as wilful only if the person liable for it intended it to happen.") It is also necessary to establish that the person intended to cause a loss, or to prove gross negligence or misconduct in which there is a very marked departure from the conduct of a reasonable person.

== Impact ==
As Peracomo was concerned with the interpretation of the Convention, and could therefore have a wide-reaching impact on commercial maritime law around the world, the case attracted international attention. It is of interest to insurers in the areas of marine insurance and protection and indemnity insurance.

The Court looked to previous cases concerning the Convention, (Note: Margolle & Anor v Delta Maritime Company Ltd. & Ors (The "Saint-Jacques II" and "Gudermes") [2002] EWHC 2452 (Admlty), [2003] 1 Lloyd’s Rep 203 (28 November 2002); Schiffahrtsgesellschaft MS Merkur Sky mbH & Co KG v MS Leerort Nth Schiffahrt (The "Leerort") [2001] EWCA Civ 1055, [2001] 2 Lloyd's Rep 291 (27 June 2001)) as well as examining the Warsaw Convention (which had inspired art. 4). It effectively pointed out that art. 4 focuses on an intention to cause the loss, while the right to limit under the Convention relates more generally to the claim. It also affirmed that the limitation of liability regime under the Convention is "virtually unbreakable", which was already the view of many legal observers.

As Wagner J pointed out, formalizing a legal difference between "reckless conduct" and "wilful misconduct" is likely to have commercial implications, and possibly increase litigation between marine insurers and their insureds.

== See also ==
- List of Supreme Court of Canada cases (McLachlin Court)
