= Pensions in Canada =

Pensions in Canada can be public, private, and collective, or come from individual savings.

== Pension plans ==
=== Canada Pension Plan (CPP) ===
The Canada Pension Plan (CPP) forms the backbone of Canada's national retirement income system. All those employed aged 18 or older (and their employers) must contribute a portion of their income (matched by their employers) into the CPP or, for Quebec residents, the Quebec Pension Plan (QPP). In all provinces and territories except Quebec, these plans are administered by Employment and Social Development Canada, while QPP is administered separately by the Quebec government.

The Canada Pension Plan Investment Board (CPPIB) is a Canadian Crown corporation established by way of the 1997 Canada Pension Plan Investment Board Act to oversee and invest the funds contributed to and held by the CPP. As of December 31, 2022, the CPP Investment Board manages over C$536 billion in assets under management for the Canada Pension Plan on behalf of 21 million Canadians and is one of the world's largest investors in private equity.

Upon retiring, a CPP contributor receives the base regular pension payments equal to 25% (in phases increasing to 40%) of the earnings on which contributions were made over the entire working life of a contributor from age 18 in constant dollars, as well as the first additional component phase (2019–2023) and the second additional component phase (2024–2025). Annual Cost-of-Living Adjustment (COLA) increases are made to the monthly payments according to the Consumer Price Index.

Although one can claim a CPP pension as early as age 60 rather than the typical retirement age of 65, those who claim it at 60 have their pension reduced by 36%. Retirees can also elect to delay their CPP claim up until age 70 to increase their monthly retirement income.

=== Provincial Pension Plans ===
Both Quebec and Saskatchewan have their own provincial plans. They are the Quebec Pension Plan (QPP) and the Saskatchewan Pension Plan (SPP), where QPP is a mandatory pension plan for residents of Quebec. Both have different contribution and retirement income rates compared to the CPP.

=== Registered Retirement Savings Plan (RRSP) ===
A Registered Retirement Savings Plan (RRSP) is a tax-advantaged retirement savings account available to Canadians. The purpose of an RRSP is to help individuals save for retirement by allowing them to contribute pre-tax income, which then grows tax-free until it is withdrawn.

The amount that an individual can contribute to an RRSP each year is based on their earned income, up to a certain limit. Contributions to an RRSP are tax-deductible, which means that they reduce an individual's taxable income for the year in which they are made. This can result in a reduction in the amount of tax that the individual owes. Any investment income earned within an RRSP is not subject to tax until it is withdrawn.

Pensioners can start withdrawing funds from their RRSP at any time, but withdrawals are subject to income tax. The amount of tax that must be paid depends on the individual's income level at the time of withdrawal. The minimum age for withdrawing funds from an RRSP without penalty is 71, at which point the account must be converted into a Registered Retirement Income Fund (RRIF) or used to purchase an annuity.When funds are withdrawn from an RRSP, they are added to the individual's taxable income for the year, and are subject to tax at the individual's marginal tax rate. For this reason, it is often advisable to withdraw funds from an RRSP in a tax-efficient manner, for example by spreading withdrawals over multiple years.

By offering tax advantages for contributions and investment income, RRSPs encourage individuals to save, and provide a source of income in retirement.

=== Old Age Security (OAS) and Guaranteed Income Supplement (GIS) ===
Old Age Security (OAS) is a monthly payment available to Canadians aged 65 or older who meet certain residency requirements. The amount of OAS payment depends on how long the applicant has lived in Canada after the age of 18, whether or not they require financial assistance (being automatically reduced to zero above specified income thresholds).

The Guaranteed Income Supplement (GIS) is a supplement to the OAS payment for very low-income and at-risk seniors. The amount of GIS payment depends on the senior's income, marital status, and whether they live alone or with a partner. Paid directly from general tax revenue, the two programs do not have dedicated investment funds like the CPP or QPP.

=== Private Pension Plans ===
In addition to the public pension system, some employers maintain private pension plans for their employees, they usually boost retirement savings. They are retirement savings plans that are sponsored by employers, unions, or other organizations. They are also known as defined benefit or defined contribution plans. Investments into these plans are not subjected to taxation until retirement. Private pension plans are subjected to various regulations among the provinces and territories, and must be registered with the authorities.

Defined benefit plans guarantee a specific retirement benefit to plan members, based on a formula that takes into account factors such as the member's years of service and earnings history. These plans are typically funded by contributions from both the employer and the employee, and are managed by professional investment managers. The risks and benefits of a defined benefit plan are largely borne by the employer, who is responsible for ensuring that the plan is adequately funded to meet its obligations.

Defined contribution plans, on the other hand, do not guarantee a specific retirement benefit. Instead, plan members contribute a portion of their income into the plan, and the contributions are invested in a portfolio of assets chosen by the plan sponsor. The ultimate value of the plan depends on the performance of the investments, and the risks and benefits are borne by the plan member.

Defined benefit plans can be vulnerable to under-funding if the plan sponsor does not contribute enough to cover the promised benefits. If a plan is underfunded, plan members may receive reduced benefits or may even lose their benefits entirely if the plan sponsor becomes insolvent. Defined contribution plans, on the other hand, are subject to investment risk, which means that the ultimate value of the plan may be lower than expected if the investments perform poorly. Hence, it is important for plan members to monitor the plan's performance and funding status over time. The age at which plan members can start drawing money from a private pension plan depends on the terms of the plan. Generally, members must be retired or have reached a certain age (typically 55 or 60) in order to start receiving pension payments. Plan members may also be able to withdraw funds from their plan before retirement in certain circumstances, such as financial hardship or disability, but these withdrawals are typically subject to taxes and penalties.

==== Claims of Defined Benefit Plans Decline ====
Despite opinion pieces claiming the imminent demise of DB plans in Canada, Statistics Canada information verifies only a slight decline in the number of plans over the most recently available five-year period (9,304 in 2017 to 9,022 in 2021 – a 3.13% reduction). Additionally, considering an increase of 213,518 active members in the same time frame (2017–2021), no data is included regarding what percentage of the declining number of DB plans is due to the increasing industry norm of plan mergers and consolidation. The 4,425,506 active members as of 2021 is a mere 1.8% decrease from the historic high of 4,505,601 active members in 2005 (when there were only 7,561 such plans).

DB plans remain the additional (after mandatory CPP or QPP) retirement income of choice for the Canadian public sector based on all data. Primary reasons include that with DB plans, regardless of investment returns, the plan sponsors are responsible for ensuring that the promised benefits are paid out, they provide guaranteed retirement security for life, and such plans lessen strain on government social programs.

== Canadian Pension Model ==
Canada's pension plans exhibit marked differences from contemporary American and European plans, in what has been broadly termed "The Canadian Model." Primary characteristics of the model include governance that is insulated from political pressures, a focus on illiquid, alternative asset classes like infrastructure and real estate, and a strong preference for in-house management of investments and direct investment. The aim of the strategy employed in the country is muting volatility and focusing on long-term returns and benefits security.

The in-house management style stands in stark contrast to the Yale Model popularized by David Swensen in the United States, while maintaining a similar focus on illiquid asset classes in search of market inefficiencies. According to a 2013 Boston Consulting Group study, over 75% of assets in the top 10 largest pension funds in Canada were managed by internal staff. This strategy comes with the dual benefit of greater control over investment and cost-reduction from streamlined organizational costs, according to Canadian proponents.

During the Great Recession this model was a beneficial hedging mechanism, as Canada's pension system saw smaller, though still marked, losses than nearly all American and European funds. However, the Bank of Canada has noted that the low-interest rate environment leftover from the various financial crises has driven Canadian pensions into more complex and more illiquid investment strategies, necessitating more attention to risk management in the future.

== See also ==
- Social programs in Canada
- Pension regulation in Canada
- Canada Pension Plan
- Registered Retirement Savings Plan
