= Century Services Inc v Canada (AG) =

- Supreme Court of Canada

Hearing: May 11, 2010 Judgment: December 16, 2010
- Citations: 2010 SCC 60, [2010] 3 SCR 379
- Docket No.: 33239
- Prior history: Appealed from Ted LeRoy Trucking Ltd. and 383838 B.C. Ltd. (re.), (2008 BCSC 1805, 2008 G.S.T.C. 221); Ted LeRoy Trucking Ltd. (Re), (2009 BCCA 205, 270 B.C.A.C. 167)

Court membership
- Chief Justice: Beverley McLachlin; Puisne Justices: Ian Binnie, Louis LeBel, Marie Deschamps, Morris Fish, Rosalie Abella, Louise Charron, Marshall Rothstein, Thomas Cromwell

Reasons given
- Majority: Deschamps J.
- Concurrence: Fish J.
- Dissent: Abella J.

Laws applied
- Companies' Creditors Arrangement Act, Bankruptcy and Insolvency Act, Excise Tax Act (GST)

Century Services Inc v Canada (AG) is a decision of the Supreme Court of Canada that describes the interrelationship between the Companies' Creditors Arrangement Act and the Bankruptcy and Insolvency Act in governing Canadian insolvency law, and how other federal statutes are accordingly construed.

== Facts ==
Ted LeRoy Trucking Ltd was one of the largest independent logging contractors on Vancouver Island. In December 2007, it was notified that, as it was in breach of certain loan covenants, its outstanding loans had to be immediately repaid. The company filed for protection under the CCAA. The court authorized LeRoy to dispose of certain redundant assets.

Century Services Inc was one of the major secured creditors of LeRoy. In April 2008, the court authorized a payment to Century not to exceed $5 million from the proceeds of disposal. As LeRoy also owed a significant liability with respect to Goods and Services Tax, it proposed that an amount equal to the liability be held back from the payment to Century and kept in the Monitor's trust account until the outcome of the reorganization was known. The court agreed and so ordered.

In September 2008, LeRoy concluded that reorganization was not possible and accordingly applied for an assignment into bankruptcy. The Crown applied to have the holdback released for payment and remitted to settle the GST liability.

== The issue ==
Under the Excise Tax Act, GST that is collected is deemed to be held in trust for the Crown, and that this takes precedence over any other statute other than the BIA. However, the CCAA states that, subject to certain exceptions (none of which relate to GST), deemed trusts do not exist in its proceedings. There was certain jurisprudence that held that the ETA took precedence. Was that correct?

== The judgments below ==
The British Columbia Supreme Court ruled that, as the funds were being held pending the emergence of a viable reorganization plan, the fact that this was unsuccessful meant that the Crown would lose its priority as a result of the assignment into bankruptcy. Accordingly, the Crown's application was dismissed.

This order was overturned on appeal to the British Columbia Court of Appeal. The court unanimously held:

- the court at first instance did not have the authority to dismiss the Crown's application, as the ETA's priority scheme took effect once the likelihood of a successful reorganization plant had ceased to be
- the judge's original order had created an express trust for the Crown, and the funds could not be diverted for any other purpose.

== Decision of the Supreme Court of Canada ==
The Court of Appeal's decision was reversed. The following were identified as the key issues in the appeal:

- did the ETA displace the CCAA by giving priority to the Crown's deemed trust in CCAA proceedings?
- did the court exceed its authority under the CCAA by lifting the stay to allow the debtor to make an assignment into bankruptcy?
- did the court's April 2008 order create an express trust in favour of the Crown with respect to the GST holdback?

The court held that:

- the CCAA and BIA form an interrelated insolvency scheme for Canada, and the ETA is subordinate to that scheme
- the court of first instance has wide discretionary authority under the CCAA, which must be interpreted having regard to the remedial nature of the CCAA and insolvency legislation generally
- no express trust was created by the court's order

=== Purpose and scope of insolvency law ===
As this was the first time a case relating to the CCAA had been heard by the Supreme Court - which it acknowledged in its decision - a detailed analysis was given in explaining the nature of insolvency law in Canada.

The BIA provides a more rules-based approach for resolving a corporate debtor's insolvency, which must be observed strictly. The CCAA, on the other hand, provides a more discretionary approach that is remedial in nature, which therefore must be broadly construed.

Although the CCAA was originally enacted in 1933, extensive use of it only began in the economic downturn of the early 1980s. Recent legislative amendments of the BIA and CCAA have served to harmonize key aspects, such as the use of single proceedings, a common priority of claims structure, and encouraging reorganization over liquidation.

=== GST deemed trust under the CCAA ===
The Parliament of Canada's recent legislative activity has tended to favour the diminishing of the Crown's priority in BIA and CCAA proceedings, and both have been expressly amended accordingly. As the ETA does not contain such express language on the subject, it must be construed within the framework of the insolvency statutes.

=== Discretionary power of a court in a CCAA reorganization ===
The legislation is remedial in the purest sense in that it provides a means whereby the devastating social and economic effects of bankruptcy or creditor initiated termination of ongoing business operations can be avoided while a court-supervised attempt to reorganize the financial affairs of the debtor company is made.

— - Elan Corp. v. Comiskey, (1990), 41 O.A.C. 282, at para. 57, per Doherty J.A., dissenting (quoted at paragraph 59)

This is noted together with s. 11 of the CCAA, which states that a court may, "subject to the restrictions set out in this Act, . . . make any order that it considers appropriate in the circumstances".

The decision notes the interrelated nature of proceedings under the CCAA and BIA:

[76] There is no doubt that had reorganization been commenced under the BIA instead of the CCAA, the Crown's deemed trust priority for the GST funds would have been lost. Similarly, the Crown does not dispute that under the scheme of distribution in bankruptcy under the BIA the deemed trust for GST ceases to have effect. Thus, after reorganization under the CCAA failed, creditors would have had a strong incentive to seek immediate bankruptcy and distribution of the debtor's assets under the BIA. In order to conclude that the discretion does not extend to partially lifting the stay in order to allow for an assignment in bankruptcy, one would have to assume a gap between the CCAA and the BIA proceedings. Brenner C.J.S.C.'s order staying Crown enforcement of the GST claim ensured that creditors would not be disadvantaged by the attempted reorganization under the CCAA. The effect of his order was to blunt any impulse of creditors to interfere in an orderly liquidation. His order was thus in furtherance of the CCAA's objectives to the extent that it allowed a bridge between the CCAA and BIA proceedings. This interpretation of the tribunal's discretionary power is buttressed by s. 20 of the CCAA. That section provides that the CCAA "may be applied together with the provisions of any Act of Parliament . . . that authorizes or makes provision for the sanction of compromises or arrangements between a company and its shareholders or any class of them", such as the BIA. Section 20 clearly indicates the intention of Parliament for the CCAA to operate in tandem with other insolvency legislation, such as the BIA. [77] The CCAA creates conditions for preserving the status quo while attempts are made to find common ground amongst stakeholders for a reorganization that is fair to all. Because the alternative to reorganization is often bankruptcy, participants will measure the impact of a reorganization against the position they would enjoy in liquidation. In the case at bar, the order fostered a harmonious transition between reorganization and liquidation while meeting the objective of a single collective proceeding that is common to both statutes.

Accordingly, the supervising judge had the necessary authority to make the order he did.

=== Express trusts ===
Creation of an express trust requires the presence of three certainties: intention, subject matter, and object. There was no certainty that the Crown would actually be the beneficiary, or object, of the trust.

Therefore, no express trust was created in this instance.

== Significance ==
Apart from an initial reference question in 1933 on the validity of the CCAA, this was the first time that an appeal had been heard by the Supreme Court. Until now, Canadian jurisprudence in this area came from the various provincial courts of appeal. Century Services was the first opportunity to explain the complete nature of Canadian insolvency law and how each of the statutes work within that framework.

The CCAA and BIA must not be viewed in isolation, as they have many features that form part of a harmonized structure. Therefore, forum shopping is discouraged and single proceedings are preferred. Because of their harmonized nature, other federal statutes must be accordingly construed.

A court must first interpret the text of the CCAA, and only then may the court look to fill in legislative "gaps" pursuant to its inherent or equitable jurisdiction. In exercising CCAA authority, the court is to bear in mind the requirements of appropriateness, good faith and due diligence as baseline considerations. As to appropriateness, the court is to inquire whether the order sought advances the public policy objectives of the CCAA – avoiding the social and economic losses resulting from a liquidation.
