= Convention on Limitation of Liability for Maritime Claims =

1976 multilateral treaty

The Convention on Limitation of Liability for Maritime Claims, also known as the LLMC Convention or the London Convention of 1976, is an IMO treaty that was concluded in London in November 1976. It entered into force in 1986, and superseded the 1957 Brussels Convention of the same name. As of October 2016, 54 states are party to the convention. The IMO adopted a Protocol to the Convention in 1996.

== Parties ==
Although 65 states have ratified the convention, it has only 54 state parties because a number of ratifying states have denounced the convention. New Zealand had ratified the convention and ceased to be a party in October 2017. In Canada, the 1996 protocol to the 1976 convention is part of the country's Marine Liability Act of 2001.

== See also ==
- Peracomo Inc. v. TELUS Communications Co.— Canadian case concerning the Convention

== Sources ==
- Hill, C. (1995), Maritime Law, 4th ed, LLP Reference Publishing, London
- Griggs, P., Williams, R. (1998), Limitation of Liability for Maritime Claims, 3rd ed, LLP Reference Publishing, London
