= Canada Pension Plan =

Contributory, earnings-related social insurance program

The Canada Pension Plan (CPP; French: Régime de pensions du Canada) is a contributory, earnings-related social insurance program. It is one of the two major components of Canada's public retirement income system, the other being Old Age Security (OAS). Other parts of Canada's retirement system are private pensions, either employer-sponsored or from tax-deferred individual savings (known in Canada as a registered retirement savings plan). As of June 30, 2024, CPP Investments (CPPIB) manages over C$646 billion in investment assets for the Canada Pension Plan on behalf of 22 million Canadians. CPPIB is one of the world's largest pension funds.

== Description ==
The CPP mandates all employed Canadians 18 years of age and over to contribute a prescribed portion of their earnings income (with an equal matching amount contributed by their employer) to a federally administered pension plan. The plan is administered by Employment and Social Development Canada on behalf of employees in all provinces and territories except Quebec, which operates an equivalent plan, the Quebec Pension Plan (Régime des rentes du Québec in French). Because the Constitutional authority for pensions is shared between the provincial and federal governments, stewardship for the CPP is jointly shared. As a result, major changes to the CPP (including those that alter how benefits are calculated) require the approval of at least seven Canadian provinces representing at least two-thirds of the country's population. John Graham is the current CEO of the CPP.

A province may choose to opt out of the Canada Pension Plan, as Quebec did in 1965, but must offer a comparable plan to its residents. Any province may establish an additional or supplementary plan anytime, as under section 94A of the Canadian Constitution, pensions are a provincial responsibility.

The CPP Fund is a professionally managed investment fund, overseen by the CPP Investments (CPPIB), an independent organization that reports to the federal and provincial governments. The CPPIB's investment strategy is guided by a set of principles that emphasize long-term benefits security, a focus on quality, and a commitment to sustainability and responsible investment practices. CPPIB also regularly reports on its investment performance and activities and is subject to oversight by the federal and provincial governments.

== History ==
The Canada Pension Plan was established in 1965 by the 26th Canadian Parliament. The bill was introduced by the Liberal minority government of Prime Minister Lester B. Pearson and was passed with the support of Tommy Douglas' New Democratic Party.

The Canada Pension plan bill had its first reading on November 9, 1964, second reading on November 18, 1964, and was passed on its third reading on March 29, 1965. It was subsequently passed by the Senate on April 2, 1965, and receive Royal Assent the following day.

The CPP began operating on January 1, 1966, with workers making contributions of 1.8% on their protected earnings, an amount matched by their employers. Self-employed individuals were required to pay both shares, for a total of 3.6%. While the CPP was created as a pay-as-you-go system, the initial CPP benefits were phased in, with full benefits becoming available after only 10 years of contributions. The CPP reached full maturity in 2013, reflecting the first year in which individuals reaching the standard age of eligibility for the retirement pension (65) would have had the ability to contribute for their entire careers, starting at age 18, rather than having a contributory period that began with the inception of the Plan on January 1, 1966.

Like most western democracies, Canada's birth rate declined in the 1970s and 1980s. In combination with increases in life expectances, Canada's population as a whole was ageing, putting financial pressures on the CPP. As a result of this, the federal and provincial governments began phasing-in an increase to the CPP's contribution rate starting in 1987. However, when actuarial projections showed what the rate would need to be in the future, governments realized that more drastic action would be required to restore the CPP's long-term financial sustainability. This resulted in public consultations that led to reform legislation in 1997. Under these reforms, the Plan adopted a partial-funding model called "steady-state" funding, under which a large reserve would be created to generate income to pay for the CPP's future liabilities. These reforms included the creation of the Canada Pension Plan Investment Board (CPPIB) to manage the reserve fund, a phased-in increase to the CPP contribution rate to 4.95% (from 1997 to 2003), the freezing of the CPP's maximum death benefit at $2,500, and the freezing of the basic exemption under which contributions aren't necessary at $3,500. Another change made to the funding model as part of these reforms was the adoption of incremental full-funding, meaning that any new or increased benefit would need to be paid for by increased contributions. This principle was adopted to ensure the Plan remained equitable across generations.

These changes were successful in stabilizing the Plan, with each subsequent report of the Chief Actuary of Canada indicating that the CPP is sustainable at the legislated contribution rates for at least the next 75. The most recent such report, the 32nd, was tabled in December 2025.

In response to concerns about private savings and declining workplace pension coverage, Canada's provincial and federal governments agreed to a modest enhancement of the CPP in 2016. The CPP enhancement began a 7-year phase-in period in 2019. Under the enhancement, the CPP's replacement rate would gradually grow from one-quarter (25.0%) of the average of the contributor's covered earnings across the contributory period to one-third (33.33%). Additionally, the level of earnings protected by the CPP was increased by 14%. Together, these measures will increase the maximum CPP retirement pension by more than 50% when the enhancement reaches maturity in 2065. The CPP enhancement was subject to incremental full-funding, meaning that benefits will slowly grow over time as individuals work and contribute.

== Benefits ==
The primary benefit provided by the CPP is a monthly retirement pension. Currently, this is equal to 25% of the average earnings on which CPP contributions were made over the entire working life of a contributor from age 18 to 65 in constant dollars. The earnings upon which contributions are made are subject to an annual limit, which was $58,700 as of 2020. However, under changes being phased in by 2025, the pension benefit will rise to 33.33% of earnings on which contributions were made, and the maximum amount of income covered by the CPP will rise by 14% from the projected 2025 limit of $69,700 to $79,400.

The CPP enhancement will serve as a top-up to the existing, or base, CPP. For individuals who work and make contributions in 2019 or later, enhanced components of benefits will be calculated and added to the base portion of the benefit. These calculations are similar but follow different formulae.

When calculating the base portion of the CPP, there is a general drop-out provision that enables the lower-earnings years in a contributor's contributory period to be dropped from the calculation of the average. Since 2014, the lowest 17% of earnings are dropped in this way, accounting for up to eight years of contributory earnings.

Benefits under the CPP enhancement will be calculated based on a forty-year period, using the best forty years to calculate the benefit. This calculation effectively allows seven years to be dropped from the benefit calculation (for an individual who begins contributing at age 18 and ends at age 65).

In October 2018, the average monthly benefits for a new retirement pension (taken at age 65) was just over $664.00 per month, and the maximum amount in 2019 was $1,154.58 per month. Monthly benefits are adjusted every year based on the Consumer Price Index. CPP benefit payments are taxable as ordinary income.

The standard age for receiving the retirement pension is age 65; however, individuals may begin collecting a permanently reduced pension as early as age 60 or defer payment until age 70 to increase the monthly payment. For those who take the pension early (the majority), the reduction factor is 0.6% for each month that benefits are received before age 65 (to a maximum reduction of 36%, at age 60). For those who defer, the adjustment rate is 0.7% for each month that one delays in receiving it, to a maximum increase of 42% at age 70. There is no financial benefit to delaying beyond age 70.

The CPP also provides disability pensions to eligible workers under the age of 65 who become disabled in a severe and prolonged fashion, and a monthly survivor's pension to the spouse or common-law partners of contributors who die (having made sufficient contributions).

An application must be filed at least six months in advance in order to receive CPP benefits. If an application for disability pension is denied, an appeal can be made for reconsideration, and then to the Social Security Tribunal. All CPP benefits in pay are indexed annually to the Consumer Price Index.

== Contribution rates ==
=== 1966 to 1996 ===
From 1966 to 1986, the contribution rate was 3.6%. The rate was 1.8% for employees (and a like amount for their employers) and 3.6% in respect of self-employed earnings. Contribution rates began rising by 0.2% per year in 1987. By 1997, this had reached combined rates of 6% of pensionable earnings.

=== 1998 reforms ===
By the mid-1990s, the 3.6% contribution rate was not sufficient to keep up with Canada's aging population, and it was concluded that the "pay-as-you-go" structure would lead to excessively high contribution rates within about 20 years, due to Canada's changing demographics, increased life expectancy, a changing economy, benefit improvements, and increased usage of disability benefits (all referenced in the Chief Actuary's study of April 2007, noted above). The same study reports that the reserve fund was expected to run out by 2015. This impending pension crisis sparked an extensive review by the federal and provincial governments in 1996. As a part of the review, the federal government actively conducted consultations with the Canadian public to solicit suggestions, recommendations, and proposals on how the CPP could be restructured to achieve sustainability again. As a result of this public consultation process and internal review, the following key changes were proposed and jointly approved by the federal and provincial governments in 1997:

- Increase total CPP annual contribution rates (employer/employee combined) from 6% of pensionable earnings in 1997 to 9.9% by 2003.
- Continuously seek out ways to reduce CPP administration and operating costs.
- Move toward a hybrid structure to take advantage of investment earnings on accumulated assets. Instead of a "pay-as-you-go" structure, the CPP is expected to be 20% funded by 2014, with this funding ratio to constantly increase thereafter toward 30% by 2075 (that is, the CPP Reserve Fund will equal 30% of the liabilities, or accrued pension obligations).
- Create the CPP Investments (CPPIB).
- Review the CPP and CPPIB every 3 years.

As of 2019, the prescribed employee contribution rate was 4.95% of a salaried worker's gross employment income between $3,500 and $57,400, to a maximum contribution of $2,668. The employer matches the employee contribution, effectively doubling the employee's contributions. Self-employed workers must pay both halves of the contribution, or 9.9% of their pensionable income, when filing their income tax return. These rates have been in effect since 2003.

=== 2017 reforms ===
The federal government and its provincial counterparts moved to enhance the Canada Pension Plan to provide working Canadians with more income in retirement. These changes were principally motivated by the declining share of the workforce that was covered by an employer defined-benefit pension plan, which had fallen from 48% of men in 1971 to 25% by 2011. They were given additional impetus by moves on the part of the government of Ontario to launch the Ontario Retirement Pension Plan, a supplementary provincial pension plan intended to begin in 2018.

Unlike the existing, or base, CPP, the enhancement to the Canada Pension Plan will be fully funded, meaning that benefits under the enhancement will slowly accrue each year as an individual works and makes contributions. Additionally, the enhancement will be phased in over a period of seven years, starting in 2019. When fully mature, the enhanced CPP will provide a replacement rate of one third (33.33%) of covered earnings, up from the quarter (25%) provided previously. Additionally, the maximum income covered by the CPP will increase by 14% by 2025 (projected by the Chief Actuary of Canada to be $79,400 in 2025, compared to the projected normal limit of $69,700 in the same year in the 28th Actuarial Report on the CPP). The combination of the increased replacement rate and increased earnings limit will result in individuals receiving retirement pensions that are 33% to 50% higher, depending on their earnings across their working years. (The maximum retirement pension will increase by 50% but will require 40 years of contributions on earnings at the new maximum.) Workers earning the 2016 maximum covered wage of $54,900 a year would receive an additional $4,390 annually (approximately $365.83 monthly).

To finance the expanded pensions and maintain the soundness of the plan, contributions to the CPP by workers and their employers will each rise 1% from current levels to 5.95% over the existing band of covered earnings. This increase will be phased in over five years starting in 2019. The increase to the earnings threshold will be phased in over two years starting in 2024. Workers and their employers will contribute 4% on earnings in this range (i.e., earnings above the normal earnings limit and below the new, higher one). To ease the impact of the increased contribution on near-term disposable income, worker contributions will become tax-deductible.

== Funding ==
=== Description ===
The base CPP is funded on a "steady-state" basis, with its current contribution rate set so that it will remain constant for the next 75 years, by accumulating a reserve fund sufficient to stabilize the asset/expenditure and funding ratios over time. This system is a hybrid between a fully funded one and a "pay-as-you-go" plan. In other words, assets held in the CPP fund are by themselves insufficient to pay for all future benefits accrued to date but sufficient to prevent contributions from rising any further. While a sustainable path for this particular plan, given the indefinite existence of a government, it is not typical of other public- or private-sector pension plans. A study published in April 2007 by the CPP's chief actuary showed that this type of funding method is "robust and appropriate" given reasonable assumptions about future conditions.

The enhancement to the CPP will be fully funded, meaning that each generation will pay for the benefits it receives. Contributions made to the enhancement will be directed into a separate account.

The chief actuary submits a report to Parliament every three years on the financial status of the plan. Future reports will report on both the base and enhanced components of the plan.

=== Assets ===
Using the "open group approach" ("one that includes all current and future participants of a plan, where the plan is considered to be ongoing into the future, that is, over an extended time horizon"), the plan is reported to have assets in excess of $3.6 trillion. This approach uses a different definition of the term "assets". "Assets" are the sum of (1) the CPP's current assets and (2) the present value of future contributions for the next 150 years, totalling $3.583 trillion.

Unlike most pension plans, the unfunded liability is not reported on the balance sheet of the Canada Pension Plan's financial statements. Consequently, the balance sheet reports that the CPP's assets exceed its liabilities by $574 billion as of March 31, 2023.

=== Unfunded liability ===
As noted in the 31st Actuarial Report on the Canada Pension Plan, if one uses the "closed group approach", the plan has an enormous unfunded liability. As of December 31, 2021, the CPP's unfunded liability was $1,142.4 billion, which is the difference between its liabilities ($1.686 trillion) and its assets ($544 billion).

While the unfunded liability has been increasing with every published Actuarial Report, the assets as a percentage of liabilities using the closed group approach has also been increasing since the 1996 reforms. The unfunded liabilities reported in the last few reports are:

Year	Actuarial Report	Unfunded Liability	Assets/Liabilities
1997	17th	$428 billion	7.8%
2000	18th	$443 billion	9.0%
2003	21st	$516 billion	11.6%
2006	23rd	$620 billion	15.5%
2009	25th	$748 billion	14.5%
2012	26th	$830 billion	17.4%
2015	27th	$884 billion	24.4%
2018	30th	$885 billion	29.6%
2021	31st	$1,142.4 billion	32.2%
2024	32nd	$971 billion	40.1%

== CPP Investment Board ==
Under the direction of then Finance Minister Paul Martin, CPP Investments (CPPIB) was created in 1997 as an organization independent of the government to monitor and invest the funds held by the CPP. In turn, the CPPIB created the CPP Reserve Fund. The CPP Investment Board is a Crown corporation created by an Act of Parliament. It reports quarterly on its performance, has a professional management team to oversee the operation of various aspects of the CPP reserve fund and to plan changes in direction, and a board of directors that is accountable to but independent from the federal government. The board reports annually to Parliament through the federal Minister of Finance.

== Quebec Pension Plan ==
Quebec is the only province that opted out of the CPP upon its formation in 1965; the government of Quebec runs its own pension program. The Quebec Pension Plan (QPP; French: Régime des rentes du Québec; RRQ) is Quebec's version of the Canada Pension Plan. The QPP is managed by Retraite Québec, which was formed from a merger of the Commission administrative des régimes de retraite et d'assurances (CARRA) and the Régie des rentes du Québec (RRQ) in 2016. Closely mirroring the CPP, the QPP is a contributory earnings-related pension plan that pays benefits in the event of the earner becoming disabled, retiring, or dying. Both Quebec and the federal tax benefits are paid from the QPP.

=== Increase in contribution rate ===
The QPP's contribution rate was 9.9% prior to 2012. In accordance with the 2011–12 Budget of the Government of Quebec, the contribution rate was increased by 0.15% per year for six years from 2012 to 2017. Consequently, the contribution rate increased to 10.8% for 2017 and subsequent years. The QPP contribution rate was reduced to 10.6% in 2026.

== See also ==
- Fiscal imbalance in Australia
- Pensions in Canada
