= Sun Indalex Finance, LLC v United Steelworkers =

- Supreme Court of Canada

Hearing: 5 June 2012 Judgment: 1 February 2013
- Citations: 2013 SCC 6
- Docket No.: 34308
- Prior history: APPEAL FROM a decision of the Court of Appeal for Ontario (2011 ONCA 265), setting aside a decision of the Ontario Superior Court of Justice (2010 ONSC 1114)
- Ruling: Appeal allowed with respect to main decision; appeal dismissed with respect to costs order

Holding
- A statutory trust was deemed to exist for the salaried plan. Because of federal paramountcy, the DIP charge takes precedence over the deemed trust. A remedial constructive trust is only appropriate if the wrongdoer's acts give rise to an identifiable asset which it would be unjust for the wrongdoer (or sometimes a third party) to retain. There is no basis to interfere with the Court of Appeal's costs endorsement.

Court membership
- Chief Justice: Beverley McLachlin; Puisne Justices: Louis LeBel, Marie Deschamps, Morris Fish, Rosalie Abella, Marshall Rothstein, Thomas Cromwell, Michael Moldaver, Andromache Karakatsanis

Reasons given
- Majority: Deschamps, joined by Moldaver
- Concurrence: Cromwell, joined by McLachlin and Rothstein
- Dissent: LeBel, joined by Abella

Sun Indalex Finance, LLC v United Steelworkers, arising from the Ontario courts as Re Indalex Limited, is a decision of the Supreme Court of Canada that deals with the question of priorities of claims in proceedings under the Companies' Creditors Arrangement Act, and how they intersect with the fiduciary duties employers have as administrators of pension plans.

== Facts ==
Indalex was a major North American manufacturer of aluminum extrusions, with six plants in the United States and four in Canada. In March 2009, the American parent corporation of Indalex sought bankruptcy protection under Chapter 11, and Indalex Limited sought similar protection under the Companies' Creditors Arrangement Act (CCAA) in April 2009.

Debtor in possession financing was secured in both proceedings for maintaining operations until a suitable resolution could be achieved. In that regard, Indalex US issued a guarantee with respect to the financing given to Indalex Limited.

In June 2009, the business assets of Indalex were sold to Sapa Group.

Indalex Limited was the sponsor and administrator of two pension plans: one for the salaried employees, and another for the executives. At the time of the proceedings, they were underfunded in the amount of CA$6.75 million.

At the court hearing to approve the sale, the United Steelworkers (representing the salaried employees) and a group representing the executives appeared to object to the planned distribution of sale proceeds, asking that a sufficient amount be retained to cover the pension plans' deficiencies, pursuant to the deemed trusts established under the Ontario Pension Benefits Act.

The sale closed on July 31, 2009, but the proceeds were insufficient to cover outstanding liabilities. Indalex US remitted US$10.75 million to cover the shortfall owing to the DIP lenders, and the Monitor withheld an amount equal to the deficiencies of the plans.

== The courts below ==
=== In the Superior Court ===
Re Indalex Limited
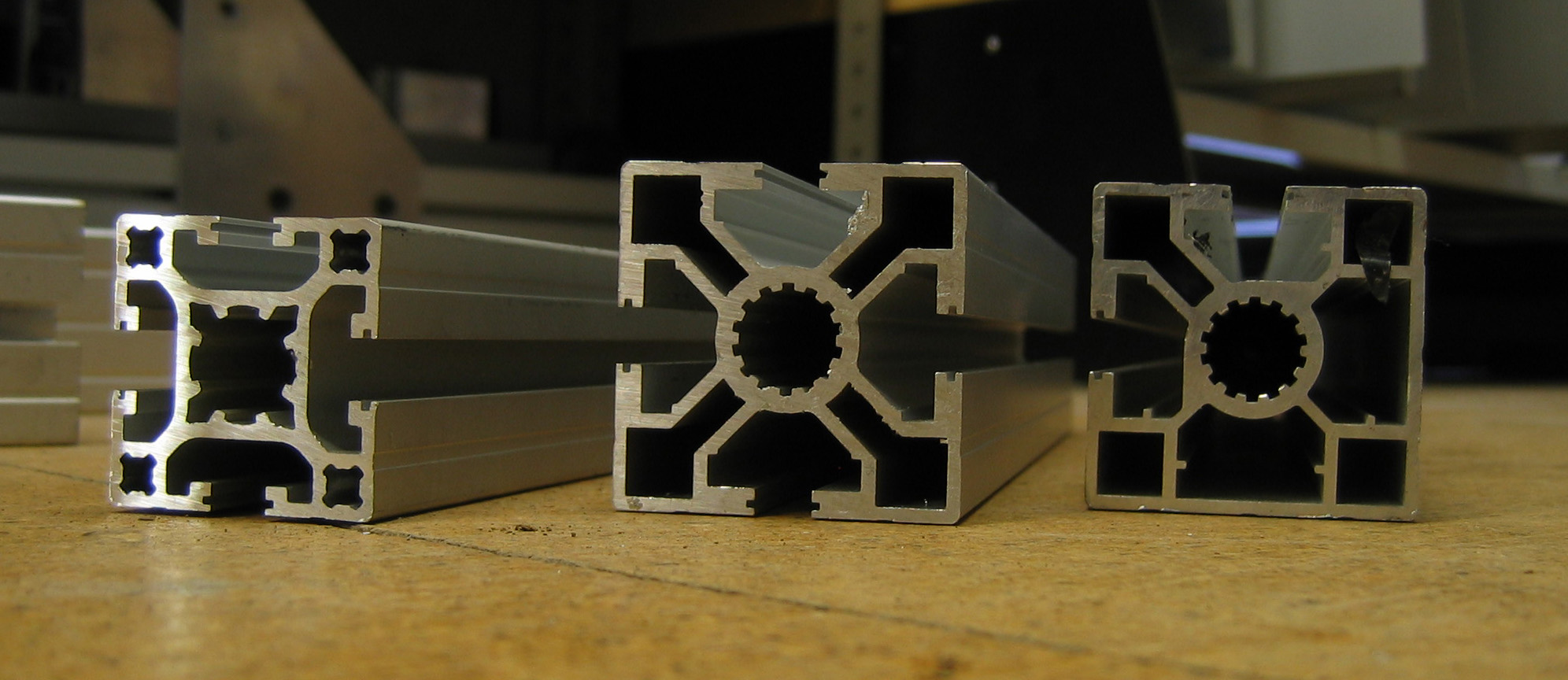
- Court: Ontario Court of Appeal
- Decided: 2011-04-07
- Citation: 2011 ONCA 265

Case history
- Prior action: 2010 ONSC 1114
- Appealed from: Ontario Superior Court of Justice
- Appealed to: Supreme Court of Canada
- Subsequent actions: Sun Indalex Finance, LLC et al. v. United Steelworkers et al.

Court membership
- Judges sitting: J.C. MacPherson, E.E. Gillese and R.G. Juriansz, JJA

Case opinions
- Decision by: E.E. Gillese JJA, setting aside a decision of Campbell J.

Keywords
- CCAA, deemed trusts under pension plans, debtor in possession lending, paramountcy of claims

In August 2009, motions were heard by the court from the USW and the executive group, arguing that the withheld amounts should be remitted to the pension plans, as the deemed trusts under the PBA had priority over the DIP lending. In addition, they argued that Indalex breached its fiduciary obligations to the Plans’ beneficiaries. In response, Indalex filed a motion to lift the stay of proceedings in effect under the CCAA, and to assign itself into bankruptcy.

In February 2010, the judge ruled that no deemed trusts had arisen in respect of either plan, and that it was unnecessary to rule on the bankruptcy motion.

=== In the Court of Appeal ===
The 2010 ruling was reversed by the Ontario Court of Appeal in April 2011. The court held:

- the trial judge erred in declaring that no deemed trust existed
- Indalex breached its fiduciary obligations as administrator of the pension plans by doing nothing to protect the best interests of their beneficiaries
- as a result, Indalex was in a conflict of interest position in its roles as employer and administrator
- there was no collateral attack on prior orders in the CCAA proceeding
- there was no undermining of the principles relating to cross-border insolvencies
- although the super-priority charge granted for the DIP lending is valid, it does not override valid provincial laws
- there was no question of the CCAA having paramountcy over the PBA in this case, as the doctrine was never argued during the proceedings, and prior court orders made no mention of it
- accordingly, a statutory trust under the PBA was deemed to exist for the Salaried Plan, but not for the Executive Plan (as a deemed trust comes into existence only when the plan is wound up)

On the issue of staying CCAA proceedings and making an assignment in bankruptcy, the court made the following obiter comment:

As for the suggestion that Indalex will pursue its bankruptcy motion in order to defeat the deemed trust, I would simply echo the comments of the CCAA judge that a voluntary assignment into bankruptcy should not be used to defeat a secured claim under valid provincial legislation. I would add this additional consideration: it is inappropriate for a CCAA applicant with a fiduciary duty to pension plan beneficiaries to seek to avoid those obligations to the benefit of a related party by invoking bankruptcy proceedings when no other creditor seeks to do so.

=== Costs endorsement ===
In September, the Ontario Court of Appeal issued a separate ruling with respect to the allocation of responsibility for the costs of the appeal. As there was no agreement among the parties, the court ruled:

- For the 14 retirees of the Executive Plan that had launched the appeal, the full legal fees and disbursements would be paid from the fund of the Executive Plan attributable to each of their accrued pension benefits. The three retirees that were not party to the appeal would not be affected. The 14 retirees had previously consented to allow that to happen.
- For the appeal launched by the USW, no legal fees and disbursements would be paid from the Salaried Plan. The union was the bargaining agent for only 7 of the 169 beneficiaries of the Plan, and no beneficiary had previously given their consent for such an arrangement to occur.
- Costs of $40,000 were ordered to be awarded to the appellants jointly and severally on a partial indemnity basis.

The USW appealed their portion of the Costs Endorsement to the Supreme Court of Canada. Leave to appeal was granted by the court on 19 January 2012, adding the issue to the docket of the main appeal.

=== Consequences and debate ===
There was much discussion about the consequences that arose from this decision, both in Canada and internationally, specifically relating to:

- the ability of the employer to be a plan administrator as well
- how plan beneficiaries are to be treated during CCAA proceedings
- the security to be given to lenders providing DIP financing
- the creditworthiness of companies that have underfunded pension plans

It was argued that the decision also gave an increased measure of protection to existing pensioners, who had seen their benefits being reduced in other CCAA proceedings, notably at Nortel Networks. As a result, Canada would have ranked with the United Kingdom as having the most aggressive pension protection in the Commonwealth.

There was also discussion of the impact Indalex might have in the area of corporate governance, as it was seen to be extending on the principles expressed by the Supreme Court of Canada in BCE Inc. v. 1976 Debentureholders.

The decision could also be seen as extending beyond the immediate question of pension protection to affect any question of the existence of a constructive trust (in contrast to the Supreme Court's recent ruling in Century Services), especially in cases of cross-border insolvencies and ring-fencing of a corporate group's assets. There were also concerns as to the effects it may have on cash collateral being held in derivatives and other securities financing transactions.

The Court of Appeal's ruling on the existence of a constructive trust is relevant only to the common law provinces of Canada. The Superior Court of Quebec has ruled that such a concept does not exist under Quebec's civil law, and therefore Indalex is not applicable in that province.

Many creditors sought to modify their lending agreements by incorporating provisions that are meant to circumvent the perceived uncertainty that may arise in similar CCAA proceedings. Significant clauses that were introduced include:

- the inclusion of bankruptcy triggers that would allow creditors to send a company directly into BIA proceedings (and thus preempt the protective provisions of the PBA), and
- the use of securities registered under the Bank Act, for the same reason

== In the Supreme Court of Canada ==
Leave to appeal was granted by the Supreme Court of Canada, and the hearing was set for 5 June 2012.

At the hearing, the justices focused on the pensioners’ concern about the lack of notice they received of the insolvency arrangements, while the appellants submitted that creditors would prefer bankruptcy to waiting behind pensioners in a CCAA restructuring.

Judgment was reserved. On 28 January 2013, the court announced that it would be released on 1 February 2013.

=== Decision ===
The main appeal was allowed, and the appeal with respect to the costs order was dismissed.

The majority opinion, written by Justice Marie Deschamps, opened with these words:

Insolvency can trigger catastrophic consequences. Often, large claims of ordinary creditors are left unpaid. In insolvency situations, the promise of defined benefits made to employees during their employment is put at risk. These appeals illustrate the materialization of such a risk. Although the employer in this case breached a fiduciary duty, the harm suffered by the pension plans’ beneficiaries results not from that breach, but from the employer’s insolvency.

The issues in the appeal were dealt with by varying majorities of the justices that heard the case. Their holdings are summarized in this table:

= majority
= dissent

Analysis of ruling
Issue	Ruling	Deschamps, joined by Moldaver	Cromwell, joined by McLachlin and Rothstein	LeBel, joined by Abella
Statutory deemed trust	4–3	The Court of Appeal correctly held with respect to the salaried plan, that Indalex was deemed to hold in trust the amount necessary to satisfy the wind‑up deficiency.	The deemed trust under the PBA does not apply to the wind‑up deficiency.	Concur with Deschamps.
Priority ranking	7–0	The federal and provincial laws are inconsistent, as they give rise to different, and conflicting, orders of priority. As a result of the application of the doctrine of federal paramountcy, the DIP charge supersedes the deemed trust.	Although there is disagreement with respect to the scope of the deemed trust, it is agreed that, if there were one in this case, it would be superseded by the DIP loan because of the operation of the doctrine of federal paramountcy.	Concur with Deschamps.
Constructive trust as a remedy for breach of fiduciary duties	5–2	Indalex's fiduciary obligations as plan administrator did in fact conflict with management decisions that needed to be taken in the best interests of the corporation. Specifically, in seeking to have a court approve a form of financing by which one creditor was granted priority over all other creditors, Indalex was asking the CCAA court to override the plan members’ priority. The corporation's interest was to seek the best possible avenue to survive in an insolvency context. The pursuit of this interest was not compatible with the plan administrator's duty to the plan members to ensure that all contributions were paid into the funds. In the context of this case, the plan administrator's duty to the plan members meant, in particular, that it should at least have given them the opportunity to present their arguments. This duty meant, at the very least, that they were entitled to reasonable notice of the DIP financing motion. The terms of that motion, presented without appropriate notice, conflicted with the interests of the plan members. As for the constructive trust remedy, it is settled law that proprietary remedies are generally awarded only with respect to property that is directly related to a wrong or that can be traced to such property. There is agreement with Justice Thomas Cromwell that this condition was not met in the case at bar and his reasoning on this issue is adopted. Moreover, it was unreasonable for the Court of Appeal to reorder the priorities in this case.	An employer‑administrator who finds itself in a conflict must bring the conflict to the attention of the CCAA judge. It is not enough to include the beneficiaries in the list of creditors; the judge must be made aware that the debtor, as an administrator of the plan is, or may be, in a conflict of interest. Accordingly, Indalex breached its fiduciary duty by failing to take steps to ensure that the pension plans had the opportunity to be as fully represented in those proceedings as if there had been an independent plan administrator, particularly when it sought the DIP financing approval, the sale approval and a motion to voluntarily enter into bankruptcy. Regardless of this breach, a remedial constructive trust is only appropriate if the wrongdoer's acts give rise to an identifiable asset which it would be unjust for the wrongdoer (or sometimes a third party) to retain. There is no evidence to support the contention that Indalex's failure to meaningfully address conflicts of interest that arose during the CCAA proceedings resulted in any such asset. Furthermore, to impose a constructive trust in response to a breach of fiduciary duty to ensure for the pension plans some procedural protections that they in fact took advantage of in any case is an unjust response in all of the circumstances.	Indalex was in a conflict of interest from the moment it started to contemplate putting itself under the protection of the CCAA and proposing an arrangement to its creditors. From the corporate perspective, one could hardly find fault with such a decision. It was a business decision. But the trouble is that at the same time, Indalex was a fiduciary in relation to the members and retirees of its pension plans. The solution was not to place its function as administrator and its associated fiduciary duties in abeyance. Rather, it had to abandon this role and diligently transfer its function as manager to an independent administrator. Indalex not only neglected its obligations towards the beneficiaries, but actually took a course of action that was actively inimical to their interests. The seriousness of these breaches amply justified the decision of the Court of Appeal to impose a constructive trust.
Costs in United Steelworkers appeal	7–0	Concur with Cromwell.	There is no basis to interfere with the Court of Appeal's costs endorsement.	Concur with Cromwell.

=== Statutory trust ===
Justice Deschamps held that the statutory deemed trust constituted under s. 57(4) of the PBA is remedial in nature, as it is intended to protect the interests of the plan members. This was consistent with related provisions in the Act, together with its legislative history and purpose. All point toward inclusion of the wind-up deficiency with respect to employer contributions upon the wind up of the pension plan.

The situation with respect to the Executive Plan was different, as it was not being wound up yet, and accordingly the wind-up deemed trust did not apply. As this was a choice that had been made by the Ontario legislature, the court would not interfere with it, but the Superintendent under the Act had the option to order a wind-up and thus bring the provision into play.

Dissent

Justice Thomas Cromwell disagreed with the Court of Appeal's interpretation of subsection 57(4), based on the grammatical and ordinary sense of the words in the phrase "accrued to the date of the wind up" in that provision, together with the broader statutory context. Finally, the legislative evolution and history of these provisions showed that the legislature never intended to include the wind-up deficiency in a statutory deemed trust.

=== Priority ranking ===
The appellants had argued that the SCC's own ruling in Century Services Inc. v. Canada (Attorney General) should be expanded to apply federal bankruptcy priorities to CCAA proceedings. The court noted, however, that Century Services had observed that there are points at which the two schemes converge. Because the CCAA is silent about what happens if reorganization fails, the BIA scheme of liquidation and distribution necessarily supplies the backdrop for what will happen if a CCAA reorganization is ultimately unsuccessful.

The provincial deemed trust under the PBA continues to apply in CCAA proceedings, subject to the doctrine of federal paramountcy The Court of Appeal therefore did not err in finding that at the end of a CCAA liquidation proceeding, priorities may be determined by the Personal Property Security Act's scheme rather than the federal scheme set out in the Bankruptcy and Insolvency Act.

This, however, is subject to any claim that may be raised relating to paramountcy of federal legislation. Subject to the application of the rules on the admissibility of new evidence, it can be raised even if it was not invoked in an initial proceeding. This is done within the framework established by Canadian Western Bank v. Alberta, and the court has already ruled that a provincial legislature cannot, through measures such as a deemed trust, affect priorities granted under federal legislation.

In this case, the judge at first instance considered factors that were relevant to the remedial objective of the CCAA, and found that Indalex had in fact demonstrated that the CCAA’s purpose would be frustrated without the DIP charge. In this case, compliance with the provincial law necessarily entailed defiance of the order made under federal law. As a result of the application of the doctrine of federal paramountcy, the DIP charge superseded the deemed trust.

=== Breach of fiduciary duty ===
The court had previously recognized that there are circumstances in which a pension plan administrator has fiduciary obligations to plan members both at common law and under statute. However, the appellants argued in favour of a "two hat" approach — i.e., the fiduciary duty only existed in the employer's role as plan administrator, but not when the directors were acting in the best interests of the corporation. The court stated that this was not the correct approach.

While the directors of a corporation also have a fiduciary duty to the corporation, the PBA recognizes that not all decisions taken by directors in managing a corporation will result in conflict with the corporation's duties to the plan's members. However, the corporation must be prepared to resolve conflicts where they arise. Reorganization proceedings place considerable burdens on any debtor, but these burdens do not release an employer that acts as plan administrator from its fiduciary obligations.

The Court of Appeal erred in holding that Indalex breached its fiduciary duty by entering into CCAA proceedings. On the other hand, it was correct in saying Indalex did so by failing to take steps to ensure that the plan beneficiaries had the opportunity to be as fully represented in those proceedings as if there had been an independent plan administrator.

For the benefit of judges that will be involved in future CCAA proceedings, Justice Cromwell offered the following guidelines:

- An employer-administrator who finds itself in a conflict must bring the conflict to the attention of the CCAA judge. It is not enough to include the beneficiaries in the list of creditors; the judge must be made aware that the debtor, as an administrator of the plan is, or may be, in a conflict of interest.
- Judges are well placed to decide how best to ensure that the interests of the plan beneficiaries are fully represented in the context of "real-time" litigation under the CCAA.
- Knowing of the conflict, a CCAA judge might consider it appropriate to appoint an independent administrator or independent counsel as amicus curiae on terms appropriate to the particular case.
- Where feasible, the judge should give notice directly to the pension beneficiaries.
- Alternatively, the judge might consider limiting draws on the DIP facility until notice can be given to the beneficiaries.
- As well expressed by the Court of Appeal, the insolvent corporation which is also a pension plan administrator cannot "simply ignore its obligations as the Plans' administrator once it decided to seek CCAA protection".

Dissent

Justice Louis LeBel considered Indalex's conflict of interest to be more serious than conceded by the majority:

Indalex was in a conflict of interest from the moment it started to contemplate putting itself under the protection of the CCAA and proposing an arrangement to its creditors. From the corporate perspective, one could hardly find fault with such a decision. It was a business decision. But the trouble is that at the same time, Indalex was a fiduciary in relation to the members and retirees of its pension plans. The "two hats" analogy offers no defence to Indalex. It could not switch off the fiduciary relationship at will when it conflicted with its business obligations or decisions. Throughout the arrangement process and until it was replaced by an independent administrator ... it remained a fiduciary.

The ability of employers to act as administrators of pension plans under the PBA does not constitute a licence to breach the fiduciary duties that flow from this function, and it should not be viewed as an invitation for the courts to whitewash the consequences of such breaches. In applying for protection under the CCAA, Indalex needed to make arrangements to avoid conflicts of interests.

The failed attempt to assign Indalex into bankruptcy after the sale of the business was also noted, and one of the purposes of that action was essentially to harm the interests of the members of the plans. Its duties as a fiduciary were clearly not at the forefront of its concerns. There were constant conflicts of interest throughout the process, and Indalex brushed them aside. In so acting, it breached its duties as a fiduciary and its statutory obligations under the PBA.

=== Constructive trust as a remedy ===
The Court of Appeal erred in several aspects of its constructive trust analysis. The governing principles arise in Soulos v. Korkontzilas, where Justice Beverley McLachlin (as she then was) considered that they must be "generally present":

1. The defendant must have been under an equitable obligation
2. The assets in the hands of the defendant must be shown to have resulted from deemed or actual agency activities of the defendant in breach of his equitable obligation to the plaintiff
3. The plaintiff must show a legitimate reason for seeking a proprietary remedy
4. There must be no factors which would render imposition of a constructive trust unjust in all the circumstances of the case

The second condition was not satisfied in this case, as the Court of Appeal found only a connection between the assets and the process by which Indalex breached its fiduciary duty. The correct standard, however, is that there must be a finding that the breach resulted in the assets being in Indalex's hands. This high standard can be found in other Court jurisprudence, such as in Lac Minerals Ltd. v. International Corona Resources Ltd..

In addition, imposing a constructive trust was wholly disproportionate to Indalex's breach of fiduciary duty. The breach had no impact on the plan beneficiaries, and the sale was nonetheless judged to be in the best interests of the corporation. A constructive trust was not an appropriate remedy in this case and that the Court of Appeal erred in principle by imposing it.

Dissent

Justice LeBel held that all four conditions in Soulos were present in this case, as noted by the Court of Appeal in its opinion. This was also affirmed in the court's previous ruling in Canson Enterprises Ltd. v. Boughton & Co. The CCAA court's jurisdiction under s. 9 of the Act is broad, and it could rely on the inherent powers of the courts to craft equitable remedies, not only in respect of procedural issues, but also of substantive questions. In this case, he believed the imposition of a constructive trust was justified.

=== Costs endorsement ===
While cost awards are discretionary, they may be set aside on appeal if the court below has made an error in principle or if the costs award is plainly wrong. Even though the distribution of costs in this case was quite complex, there was no basis to interfere with the Court of Appeal's costs endorsement.

The Steelworkers represented only 7 of the 169 members of the Salaried Plan, and it was not fair to have its costs assessed against all members, in what was already an underfunded plan.

== Aftermath ==
“The phones are burning up on Bay Street today.”

Edward Sellers, partner with Osler, Hoskin & Harcourt

Reaction was immediate and widespread, given that the range of interveners in Sun Indalex reflected the fact that the scope and importance of many of the issues raised in the case apply equally in non-insolvency circumstances. Restructuring experts in the Canadian legal community welcomed the decision as being pragmatic, and pension plan administrators noted how the decision dealt with situations where companies administer their own pension plans. Other lawyers noted that Sun Indalex hands pensioners some new tools to use in similar court fights. The immediate impact to the Indalex pension plan members was that they would lose about half of what they would have received under their full pensions.

While some commentators described Sun Indalex as "clear and thoughtful", concern was also expressed as to the fairness of the result, and questioning whether appropriate choices had been made in establishing the framework of federal bankruptcy and insolvency legislation.

Other Canadian legal commentators have also pointed out:

- as the court held that the creation of a constructive trust was not the appropriate remedy in this case, it has left open further issues.
- the case involved interpretation of the CCAA as it stood prior to amendments being made to it in 2009 which make debtor-in-possession financing an explicit statutory provision of the CCAA and specifically state that a court may order that such a charge rank in priority to any "secured creditor". Given how "secured creditor" is defined in the CCAA, there remains room to argue that the definition does not catch deemed trusts under the PBA thereby providing an avenue of attack to the paramountcy argument advanced in Indalex.
- the ruling appears to have affirmed previous decisions (including some in the lower courts) that give certainty to orders in CCAA proceedings providing for DIP charges, and for lenders to rely on the doctrine of paramountcy to give effect to their priority.
- the SCC ruling did not directly address the Court of Appeal's observation on the appropriateness of a CCAA applicant invoking bankruptcy when no creditor has sought it, but it appears the court does not consider this to be a breach of fiduciary duty as long as any conflict of interest is being meaningfully addressed.
- the content of the corporation’s fiduciary duties upon the discovery of a conflict of interest remains uncertain, but Sun Indalex suggests that corporations would be wise to inform the CCAA judge of conflicts of interest even if they decide to resolve the conflicts themselves.
- the one new factor that the SCC has introduced in its ruling is the determination that a statutory deemed trust under the PBA unequivocally applies to the amount of any deficit in a pension plan that is already in wind-up. This can potentially impact the priority of secured lenders in all cases other than formal bankruptcy, as businesses with significant defined benefit pension plans may face challenges when seeking financing. The decision may further encourage the trend for employers to move away from providing such plans.
- as Sun Indalex has expanded the scope of deemed trusts under provincial law, there are scenarios where commercial lenders may be reluctant to provide restructuring financing, thus making proceedings under the Bankruptcy and Insolvency Act look more attractive for distressed companies and their creditors.
- there remain potential arguments relying on the Bank Act and the security that it contemplates to contest the priority of pension plan deemed trust claims.
- Deschamps J noted that the SCC had previously left for future determination the operation of equitable subordination in Canada but that she declined to endorse it in the Indalex decision. She held there was no evidence that the DIP Lenders committed a wrong or engaged in inequitable conduct. As a result, it remains an open issue as to whether the doctrine of equitable subordination can be invoked in Canada to subordinate the claims of prior-ranking secured creditors in favour of junior-ranking creditors.
- The SCC only focused on specific issues in the Indalex appeal, and left the remainder of the Court of Appeal ruling untouched. Taken together with its ruling in Caisse Drummond, concerns that were previously raised with respect to cash collateral arrangements with entities subject to the PBA are still valid, and it has been recommended that such arrangements not be governed by Ontario law, with collateral held offshore.

Practical implications arising from Sun Indalex include the following:

- The court in Indalex did not deal expressly with the ability of a secured creditor to bring a motion to initiate bankruptcy proceedings following a failed attempt to restructure or complete a liquidation under the CCAA. It is likely that prior case law permitting a secured creditor to pursue a motion to lift a CCAA stay and petition a debtor into bankruptcy to reverse priorities is still effective.
- Asset-based lenders should feel much more comfortable in financing companies with provincially registered (as opposed to federally registered) defined benefit plans in a deficiency position and will not automatically reserve from availability all such deficits against availability under applicable credit facilities.
- Lenders are expected to include similar representations, warranties and covenants (including default triggers and prohibitions on wind ups and creating new defined benefit plans) and to take federal Bank Act security wherever possible.
- An increased frequency is foreseen in the use of "pre-packaged" restructuring plans framed under BIA proposal proceedings at the insistence of the lenders and parties offering interim financing in insolvency.

=== Consideration of 2009 amendments to CCAA ===
Sun Indalex was decided under the provisions of the CCAA that were in effect prior to amendments that came into effect on 18 September 2009. Legal commentary on the impact of such amendments on the SCC ruling suggest:

- new CCAA provisions relating to the protection of pension claims may be construed to mean that a PBA deemed trust should no longer survive the commencement of a CCAA proceeding (but no court has yet ruled on the point)
- if it is held that such a deemed trust survives, then it can be reasonably assumed that other statutory trusts with similar protection under provincial law (such as those in Ontario with respect to accrued vacation pay) would be equally valid
