= R v Marshall; R v Bernard =

- Supreme Court of Canada

Hearing: January 17, 18, 2005 Judgment: July 20, 2005
- Full case name: Her Majesty The Queen v Joshua Bernard, et al. and Her Majesty The Queen v Stephen Frederick Marshall, et al.
- Citations: 2005 SCC 43, [2005] 2 S.C.R. 220
- Ruling: The appeals allowed and the convictions restored. Marshall cross‑appeal is dismissed.

Court membership
- Chief Justice: Beverley McLachlin; Puisne Justices: Michel Bastarache, Ian Binnie, Louis LeBel, Marie Deschamps, Morris Fish, Rosalie Abella, Louise Charron

Reasons given
- Majority: McLachlin C.J.
- Concurrence: LeBel J.

R v Marshall; R v Bernard 2005 SCC 43 is a leading Aboriginal rights decision of the Supreme Court of Canada where the Court narrowed the test from R. v. Marshall for determining the extent of constitutional protection upon Aboriginal practices. The Court held that there was no right to commercial logging granted in the "Peace and Friendship treaties of 1760", the same set of treaties in which the right to commercial fishing was granted in the R. v. Marshall decision. This decision also applied and developed the test for aboriginal title from Delgamuukw v British Columbia.

== Background ==
This decision considers two separate cases. In the first, Stephen Marshall (no relation to Donald Marshall) and 34 other Mi'kmaq were charged with cutting down timber on Nova Scotia Crown land without a permit. In the second case, Joshua Bernard, a Mi'kmaq man, was charged with possession of logs cut from Crown lands and stolen from a rural New Brunswick sawmill.

In both cases all of those accused argued that their status as Indian gave them the right to log on Crown land for commercial purposes as granted by the treaties of Peace and Friendship.

At trial, the judges convicted all of those accused. At the provincial courts of appeal, the convictions were overturned.

== Opinion of the court ==
McLachlin, writing for the majority, held that there was no right to commercial logging under the treaties. From the evidence she found that it did not support the conclusion that commercial logging formed the basis of the Mi'kmaq's traditional culture and identity. The majority restored the convictions at trial.

Regarding the claim of aboriginal title, the majority affirms the test from Delgamuukw: "claimants must prove “exclusive” pre-sovereignty “occupation” of the land by their forebears." Applying this test, the majority did not find that seasonal hunting or fishing in an area was sufficient, on its own, to establish the existence of aboriginal title. They left open the possibility that with enough evidence, nomadic or semi-nomadic people could establish aboriginal title based on their non-permanent use of a piece of land, as long as sufficient exclusivity or control was also demonstrated.

== See also ==
- List of Supreme Court of Canada cases (McLachlin Court)
- The Canadian Crown and First Nations, Inuit and Métis
- Canadian Aboriginal case law
- Numbered Treaties
- Indian Act
- Section Thirty-five of the Constitution Act, 1982
- Indian Health Transfer Policy (Canada)
