= Canadian Forum on Civil Justice =

Canadian non-profit organization

- Formation: 1998; 28 years ago
- Type: Non-profit
- Purpose: Advancing civil justice reform
- Headquarters: Ignat Kaneff Building, Osgoode Hall Law School, York University, Toronto, ON
- Region served: Canada

The Canadian Forum on Civil Justice (CFCJ) is a national non-profit organization that has been dedicated to advancing civil justice reform through research and advocacy since 1998. CFCJ strives to make the civil justice system more accessible, effective and sustainable by leading and participating in projects that place the citizen at the center of our civil justice system.

CFCJ was established in response to recommendations presented in the Systems of Civil Justice Task Force Report released in 1996 by the Canadian Bar Association. This report sought to "develop strategies and mechanisms to facilitate modernization of the justice system so that it is better able to meet the current and future needs of Canadians."

In 2011, CFCJ moved from the Faculty of Law at the University of Alberta to York University where it is affiliated with Osgoode Hall Law School and the York Centre for Public Policy and Law.
