= GuestLogix =

- Type: Private
- Industry: Travel industry, Retailing, Software Development, Information Technology
- Founded: 2002
- Headquarters: Toronto, Ontario, CAN
- Key people: Robin Hopper (President)
- Products: POS terminal, Application software
- Owner: Stornoway Portfolio Management
- Number of employees: 50-201 in 4 countries
- Website: www.guestlogix.com

Guestlogix Inc. is a Toronto-based technology company that provides onboard and off-board retail technology and merchandising systems. It was listed on the Toronto Stock Exchange, after being initially listed on the Toronto Venture Exchange in 2007. In February 2016, it entered creditor protection, and trading on the stock was suspended. It subsequently sold OpenJaw Technologies, a Dublin-based company it had purchased in 2014, to TravelSky, for $38 million. In July 2016, it sold its main Onboard business to a group led by Stornoway Portfolio Management. Under its new ownership, it re-launched in June 2017.

== Overview ==
In 2002, company founders Tom Douramakos and Brett Proud launched GuestLogix Inc. in Toronto, Ontario. The company operates regional offices in the United States, United Kingdom, Hong Kong and sales and support centers in Singapore and South Korea. Guestlogix was listed at 375th on the 2013 Deloitte's North America Technology Fast 500 and 39th on the 2013 Canadian Technology Fast 50.

== Products ==
- Point of Sale (POS) terminals and software
- Onboard storesoftware
- Reporting & analytics tools
