= Seán Harrington (Irish republican) =

Irish republican (1900–1976)

Seán Harrington (1900–1976) was an Irish republican paramilitary who later became a prominent member of the Society of Friends.

== Biography ==
Born in Dublin, Harrington joined the Irish Republican Army (IRA), and fought in the Irish War of Independence. He opposed the Anglo-Irish Treaty and remained with the anti-Treaty IRA through the Irish Civil War. On release, Harrington relocated to Dublin, where he found work as the caretaker at the Court Laundry. This was a difficult role, as local levels of crime were high. In December, he was tied to his bed and beaten, taking three months to recover; he apprehended an armed robber in April 1946.

He broke his links with the paramilitary movement and also left the Catholic church, joining a group of Quakers; this group attracted some opposition, and Harrington lost the hearing in one ear after being attacked by a group of young Catholic extremists.

By the late 1960s, Harrington had left Ireland and moved to Tring in Hertfordshire.
