= HFI Flooring Inc =

Canadian hard surface distributor

HFI Hardwood Flooring Inc was the first national Canadian Hard Surface distributor. It included branches in Calgary, Edmonton, Montreal, Toronto, Vancouver and Winnipeg, becoming the largest distributor of wood flooring in Canada.

HFI Hardwood Flooring Inc. was a distributor for the following flooring lines: Robbins, Harris Tarkett, Formica Flooring, MetroFlor, Gammapar, Permagrain, Searcy Flooring.

HFI Hardwood Flooring Inc. was also a distributor for the following accessory product lines: BonaKemi, Dura Seal, Stanely Bostich, Primatech, Norton Abrasives, Woodwise, 3M, Lagler Hummel Sanding Equipment, Clarke Flooring Machines.

== Court action ==
HFI Hardwood Flooring Inc. v.the Deputy Minister of National Revenue Appeal No. AP-94-188

HFI successfully appealed under section 67 of the Customs Act from three decisions of the Deputy Minister of National Revenue made under subsection 63(3) of the Customs Act on Monday, July 17, 1995.

This successful appeal changed the way duties were charged on wood flooring products, thereby reducing the cost of wood flooring, making it more affordable for the consumer. This was an important factor in wood flooring's significant increase in popularity and market share with the North American consumer over the last generation.

== Initial public offering ==
HFI made a successful initial public offering (IPO) on 21 May 1998. Price to the public per common share was $0.30 and the total offering of public common shares was CN$300,000. Combined with a private placement of $3,500,000 and personal investments by management, the total money raised to fund HFI's combined expansion was in excess of $5,000,000.

== Financial statements ==
Following the IPO, records of HFI Flooring were made public, resulting in a requirement to disclose financial and business information.

== Trading order and ban ==
On March 31, 2001, the public records show that the Canadian Securities imposed a Cease Trading Ban on HFI Flooring Inc. - "The Issuer has failed to file an interim financial statement for the nine month period ended March 31, 2001, as required under section 144(1) of the Securities Rules, B.C. Reg. 194/97, (the "Required Record"); It is ordered under section 164(1) of the Securities Act, R.S.B.C. 1996, c. 418, that all trading in the securities of the Issuer cease until the Issuer files the Required Record."

A cease trade order (CTO) is a decision issued by a provincial or territorial securities regulatory authority or similar regulatory body against a company or an individual.

== Loan agreements ==
December 28, 2000 - Canadian securities regulatory authorities public documentation show that HFI defaulted on its loan agreements - "HFI Flooring Inc. (CDNX : HFI) announced today that it has been formally advised by its asset-based lender, Congress Financial Corporation (Canada), ("Congress"), that HFI is in default on its loan agreement as a consequence of no longer meeting Congress’ net worth covenant"

== Companies’ Creditor Agreement Act ==
On January 30, 2001, HFI was placed under a Company Creditor's Arrangement Act protective order, [CCAA], pending the submission of a reorganization plan to its creditors. A Court Order ("the Order") was granted by the Ontario Supreme Court, on January 30, 2001 under the CCAA, giving protection to HFI in order to continue the re-structuring of the Company. On February 1, 2001, the company said "HFI has made a pro-active move and filed for court protection under the Companies’ Creditor Agreement Act ("CCAA"). This legislation allows HFI to carry on their regular business during the reorganization period. Uncooperative creditors of HFI during this period are prevented from disrupting our regular business. This is not a bankruptcy or a receivership, but allows HFI time to focus on getting back to our business of selling product."

The assets of HFI were then sold to Domcor on March 26, 2001.
