= Sean J. Harrington =

Canadian judge

Judge of the Federal Court of Canada
- Incumbent
- Assumed office September 16, 2003

Personal details
- Born: April 24, 1944 (age 81) Montreal, Quebec

Sean J. Harrington (born April 24, 1944) is a lawyer who previously served as a judge serving on the Federal Court of Canada from 2003 to 2019.
