= Thomas Cromwell (jurist) =

Canadian judge (born 1952)

Thomas Cromwell CC
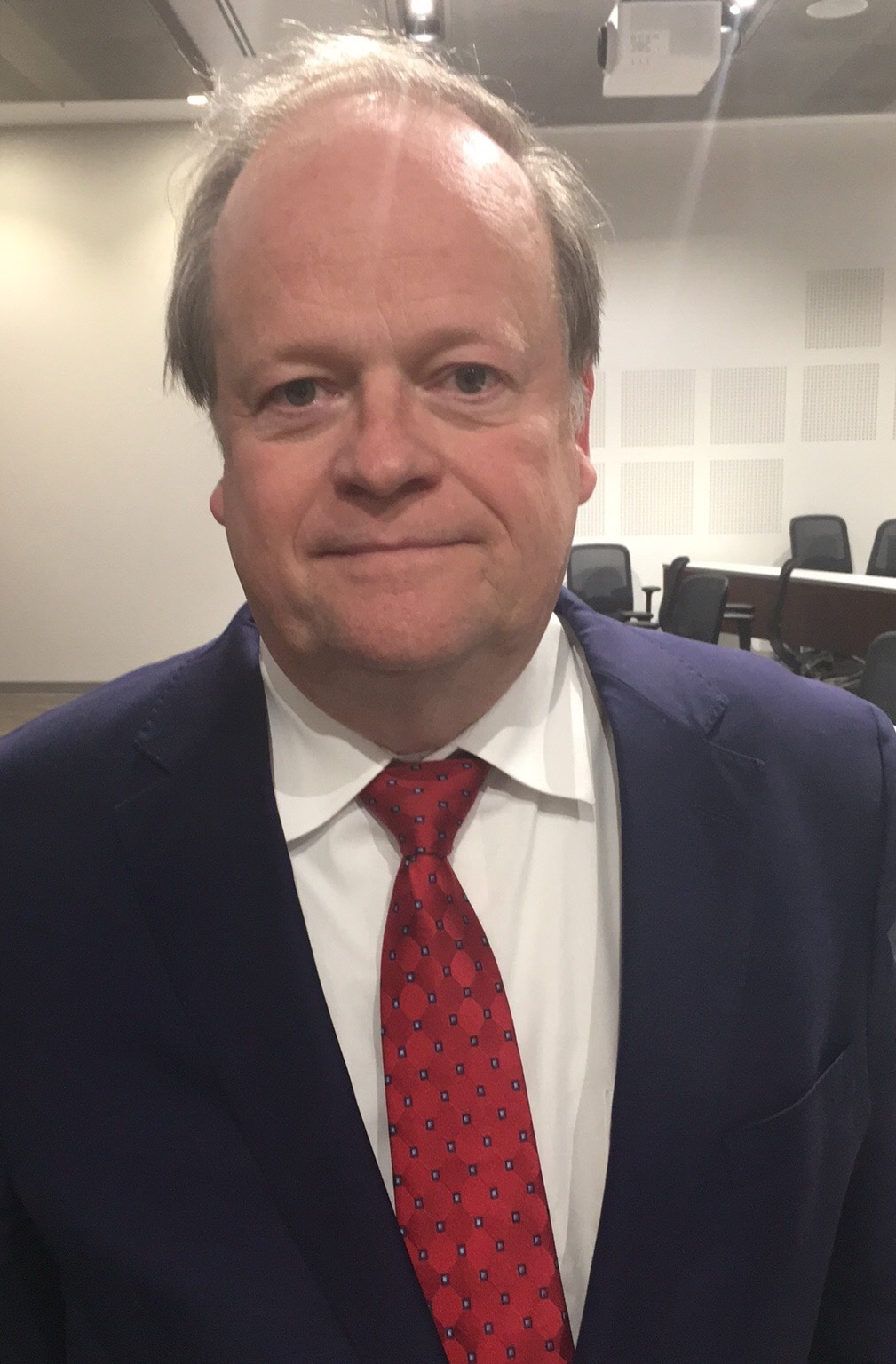
- Justice Cromwell in October 2017

Puisne Justice of the Supreme Court of Canada
- In office December 22, 2008 – September 1, 2016
- Nominated by: Stephen Harper
- Appointed by: Michaëlle Jean
- Preceded by: Michel Bastarache
- Succeeded by: Malcolm Rowe

Personal details
- Born: Thomas Albert Cromwell; May 5, 1952 (age 74) Kingston, Ontario
- Education: Queen's University at Kingston (BMus, LLB); Exeter College, Oxford (BCL); Royal Conservatory of Music (ARCT)

Thomas Albert Cromwell CC (born May 5, 1952) is a Canadian jurist and former Puisne Justice on the Supreme Court of Canada. After eleven years on the Nova Scotia Court of Appeal, Cromwell was nominated to succeed Michel Bastarache and occupy the seat traditionally reserved for Atlantic provinces on the Supreme Court of Canada by Prime Minister Stephen Harper and assumed office on December 22, 2008. Cromwell retired in September 2016, and was succeeded by Malcolm Rowe.

Known as a centrist on Canada's highest court, his reasoning as a provincial appellate judge in R v Marshall; R v Bernard was adopted by unanimous decision in the landmark Aboriginal title case of Tsilhqot'in Nation v British Columbia in 2014 during his tenure.

== Early life and education ==
Cromwell was born in Kingston, Ontario. He attended Queen's University where he earned a Bachelor of Music degree in 1973 and a law degree in 1976. He then earned a Bachelor of Civil Law degree at Exeter College, Oxford in 1977. He also earned an ARCT Diploma from the Royal Conservatory of Music in 1974.

== Career ==
He practised law in Kingston from 1979 to 1982 and was a sessional lecturer in civil procedure at the Queen's Law School from 1980 to 1982. He was a professor of law at Dalhousie University from 1982 to 1992 and again from 1995 to 1997.

Between these two periods he was Executive Legal Officer in the chambers of then-Chief Justice of Canada Antonio Lamer.

In 1997, Jean Chrétien appointed him to the Nova Scotia Court of Appeal as a direct appointment (meaning he did not serve on a lower court). In that role, Cromwell decided in favour of recognizing the claimant's Aboriginal title in R v Marshall; R v Bernard, but his reasoning was overturned by the Supreme Court.

When announcing the nomination to the Supreme Court of Canada, Harper stated that Cromwell would not be appointed to the bench until he had answered questions from an ad hoc all-party committee of the House of Commons. However, this process was bypassed when Cromwell was officially appointed; Prime Minister Harper had expressed concern that waiting for the committee to meet would hobble the court in executing "its vital constitutional mandate effectively." However, Parliament wound up meeting only very seldom after Cromwell's initial nomination, mainly because of a federal election called by Harper for October 14, and then the subsequent proroguing of Parliament on December 4, until its scheduled resumption on January 26, 2009.

While on the Supreme Court, Cromwell joined the rest of the court in a unanimous decision in Tsilhqot'in Nation v British Columbia to recognize the existence of Aboriginal title for the Tsilhqot'in. The decision that drew in large part from his previously rejected Nova Scotia Court of Appeal ruling in R v Marshall; R v Bernard, vindicating his earlier judgement.

Cromwell wrote the minority opinion in R v Jordan, criticizing the majority's decision to impose strict time limits of 18 months in provincial court and 30 months in superior court after which a case would be stayed for "presumptively unreasonable" delay except in exceptional circumstances. Cromwell argued that what was unreasonable was specific to each individual case, and the numbers decided by the majority without much discussion, would lead to more stays than necessary.

Justice Cromwell retired from the Supreme Court of Canada on September 1, 2016, at the age of 64, fulfilling a personal intention to resign around age 65. Throughout his eight-year service on the Supreme Court, Cromwell authored around a hundred decisions and earned a reputation as a centrist, neither left or right, activist or deferent. After his departure from the Supreme Court, Chief Justice Beverley McLachlin asked him to remain as the chair of the Canadian Forum on Civil Justice's action committee addressing issues related to access to justice for civil and family matters. Cromwell's departure from the Supreme Court before the mandatory retirement of 75 hurried plans by the government of Prime Minister Justin Trudeau to create an independent nominee advisory board chaired by former prime minister Kim Campbell.

In February 2017, Cromwell joined Borden Ladner Gervais as counsel.

On February 12, 2019, former Minister of Justice and Attorney General of Canada Jody Wilson-Raybould retained Cromwell to advise her in the wake of her resignation from the federal cabinet.

In December 2020, Cromwell was commissioned by the University of Toronto Faculty of Law to conduct an impartial investigation of the search process it had used to hire a new director for its International Human Rights Program. The report was commissioned after allegations that a sitting judge of the Tax Court of Canada, David Spiro, had improperly interfered with the search process. On March 15, 2021 Cromwell released his report. The Report has drawn criticism from legal scholars and academics as to its accuracy, scope, and potential conflict of interest issues. The scandal and subsequent Report has led to the Canadian Association of University Teachers censuring the University of Toronto.

== See also ==
- Reasons of the Supreme Court of Canada by Justice Cromwell
