= Pension regulation in Canada =

Within Canadian law, Pension regulation in Canada falls mostly within provincial jurisdiction by virtue of the property and civil rights power under the Constitution Act, 1867. For workers whose employers are subject to federal jurisdiction, such jurisdiction extends to regulating pension plans available to them.

== Pension Benefits Act (Ontario) ==
The Pension Benefits Act is administered by the Superintendent of Financial Services appointed by the Financial Services Commission of Ontario. Ontario regulates approximately 8,350 employment pension plans, which comprise more than 40 per cent of all registered pension plans in Canada.

It was originally enacted as the Pension Benefits Act, 1965 (S.O. 1965, c. 96), and it was the first statute in any Canadian jurisdiction to regulate pension plans.

=== Overview ===
- all pension plans in the province must be registered with the Superintendent
- a plan must have an administrator
- the administrator has a statutory duty to exercise care, diligence and skill
- the plan may be either defined benefit or defined contribution, and appropriate rules are in place to protect the benefits that have accordingly accrued to each member
- rules are in effect to determine the value of benefits that may be transferred or divided for family law purposes
- the plan must have sufficient funding to provide the benefits that have been committed under it
- protections are in place in the event of the winding up of a plan, or the underfunding of a plan in the event of the employer's insolvency
- transfers between plans cannot take place without the Superintendent's authorization
- a guarantee fund is in place for guaranteeing certain benefits provided by plans, and it is funded by all employers providing such plans

=== Content ===
Structure of the Act by section
Sections	Description
(1-1.1)	Interpretation
(2-5.1)	Application
(6-24)	Registration and administration
(24.1-30.1)	Record keeping and disclosure
(31-34)	Membership
(35-38)	Retirement
(39-54)	Benefits
(55-62.1)	Contributions
(63-67)	Locking in
(67.1-67.6)	Family law matters
(68-77)	Winding up
(77.1-77.10)	Transition - partial wind up
(77.11-79.0.1)	Surplus
(79.1-81)	Asset transfers between pension plans
(81.1)	Insolvency and bankruptcy
(82-86)	Pension Benefits Guarantee Fund
(87-88)	Superintendent's orders
(89-91)	Notices of, and appeals from, intended decisions and orders
(95-99)	Financial Services Commission of Ontario
(100-101)	Agreements with designated jurisdictions
(102)	Exemptions and special arrangements
(103-116)	General

== Manner of regulation by jurisdiction ==
In addition to registration requirements under the Income Tax Act relating to eligibility of expenses and deductions that are administered by the Canada Revenue Agency, plans are registered in the host jurisdiction as follows:

Jurisdiction	Act	Supervisory authority
Canada (Federal)	Pension Benefits Standards Act, 1985 (R.S.C., 1985, c. 32 (2nd Supp.))	Office of the Superintendent of Financial Institutions
British Columbia	Pension Benefits Standards Act, RSBC 1996 C. 352	British Columbia Financial Institutions Commission
Alberta	Employment Pension Plans Act RSA 2000, C. E‑8	Office of the Alberta Superintendent of Pensions
Saskatchewan	The Pension Benefits Act, 1992 SS 1992, C. P-6.001	Financial and Consumer Affairs Authority of Saskatchewan
Manitoba	The Pension Benefits Act C.C.S.M. c. P32	Office of the Superintendent - Pension Commission
Ontario	Pension Benefits Act R.S.O. 1990, C. P.8	Financial Services Commission of Ontario
Quebec	Supplemental Pension Plans Act R.S.Q., c. R-15.1	Régie des rentes du Québec
New Brunswick	Pension Benefits Act C. P-5.1	Office of the Superintendent of Pensions
Nova Scotia	Pension Benefits Act RSNS 1989 C. 340	Office of the Superintendent of Pensions
Prince Edward Island	No legislation in force. A bill is currently being considered by the Legislative Assembly	
Newfoundland and Labrador	Pension Benefits Act, 1997 SNL1996 C. P-4.01	Superintendent of Pensions
Yukon	As for Federal	
Northwest Territories	As for Federal	
Nunavut	As for Federal	
