= List of Supreme Court of Canada cases (by author) =

The following is a list of notable decisions by the Supreme Court of Canada sorted by author.

Understanding what cases were authored by whom can be important. For example, in early interpretation of the Canadian Charter of Rights and Freedoms, it has been said there was much agreement. However, in the third year of this interpretation the judges of the Supreme Court "each had started to develop their own method of reasoning."

== List ==
Decisions of the Court:

- By the Court decisions of the Supreme Court of Canada

Current justices:

- Reasons of the Supreme Court of Canada by Chief Justice Wagner
- Reasons of the Supreme Court of Canada by Justice Karakatsanis
- Reasons of the Supreme Court of Canada by Justice Côté
- Reasons of the Supreme Court of Canada by Justice Rowe
- Reasons of the Supreme Court of Canada by Justice Martin
- Reasons of the Supreme Court of Canada by Justice Kasirer
- Reasons of the Supreme Court of Canada by Justice Jamal
- Reasons of the Supreme Court of Canada by Justice O'Bonsawin

Past justices:

- Reasons of the Supreme Court of Canada by Justice Brown
- Reasons of the Supreme Court of Canada by Justice Abella
- Reasons of the Supreme Court of Canada by Justice Cromwell
- Reasons of the Supreme Court of Canada by Justice Moldaver
- Reasons of the Supreme Court of Canada by Justice Gascon
- Reasons of the Supreme Court of Canada by Chief Justice Lamer
- Reasons of the Supreme Court of Canada by Chief Justice McLachlin
- Reasons of the Supreme Court of Canada by Justice L'Heureux-Dubé
- Reasons of the Supreme Court of Canada by Justice Gonthier
- Reasons of the Supreme Court of Canada by Justice Iacobucci
- Reasons of the Supreme Court of Canada by Justice Major
- Reasons of the Supreme Court of Canada by Justice Arbour
- Reasons of the Supreme Court of Canada by Justice Bastarache
- Reasons of the Supreme Court of Canada by Justice Charron
- Reasons of the Supreme Court of Canada by Justice Binnie
- Reasons of the Supreme Court of Canada by Justice LeBel
- Reasons of the Supreme Court of Canada by Justice Deschamps
- Reasons of the Supreme Court of Canada by Justice Fish
- Reasons of the Supreme Court of Canada by Justice Rothstein
- Reasons of the Supreme Court of Canada by Justice Sopinka

== Decisions by Dickson ==
=== Majority ===
- Solosky v. The Queen, [1980]
- Hunter v. Southam Inc., 1984
- R. v. Therens, 1985
- R. v. Big M Drug Mart Ltd., 1985
- R. v. Oakes, 1986
- Beauregard v. Canada, 1986
- R. v. Edwards Books and Art Ltd., 1986
- R. v. Morgentaler, 1988
- General Motors of Canada Ltd. v. City National Leasing, 1989
- Brooks v. Canada Safeway Ltd., 1989
- R. v. Sparrow, 1990 (with La Forest J)
- R. v. Keegstra, 1990
- Mahe v. Alberta, 1990

== Decisions by La Forest ==
=== Majority ===
- Canada v. Schmidt, [1987] 1 S.C.R. 500
- United States of America v. Cotroni; United States of America v. El Zein, [1989] 1 S.C.R. 1469
- R. v. Sparrow, [1990] 1. S.C.R. 1075 (with Dickson)
- McKinney v. University of Guelph, [1990] 3 S.C.R. 229
- Douglas/Kwantlen Faculty Assn. v. Douglas College, [1990] 3 S.C.R. 570
- Morguard Investments Ltd. v. De Savoye, [1990] 3 S.C.R. 1077
- Eldridge v. British Columbia (Attorney General), [1997] 2 S.C.R. 624
