= Sexual consent =

Voluntary agreement to engage in sexual activity

Sexual consent is consent to engage in sexual activity. In many jurisdictions, sexual activity without consent is considered rape or other forms of sexual assault.

== Academic discussion of consent ==
In the late 1980s, academic Lois Pineau argued that society must move towards a more communicative model of sexuality so that consent becomes more explicit and clear, objective and layered, with a more comprehensive model than "no means no" or "yes means yes". Many universities have instituted campaigns about consent. Creative campaigns with attention-grabbing slogans and images that market consent can be effective tools to raise awareness of campus sexual assault and related issues.

In Canada, "consent means [...] the voluntary agreement of the complainant to engage in sexual activity" without abuse or exploitation of "trust, power or authority", coercion or threats. Consent can also be revoked at any moment. The Supreme Court of British Columbia ruled that badgering alone, followed by an agreement, does not meet the threshold of coercion to vitiate consent.

Since the late 1990s, new models of sexual consent have been proposed. Specifically, the development of "yes means yes" and affirmative and ongoing models of consent, such as Hall's definition: "the voluntary approval of what is done or proposed by another; permission; agreement in opinion or sentiment." Hickman and Muehlenhard state that consent should be "free verbal or nonverbal communication of a feeling of willingness' to engage in sexual activity." Affirmative consent may still be limited since the underlying, individual circumstances surrounding the consent cannot always be acknowledged in the "yes means yes", or in the "no means no", model.

== Elements of consent ==
=== Moral and legal perspectives ===
Within the scholarly literature, definitions surrounding consent and how it should be communicated have been contradictory, limited or without consensus. Dr James Roffee, a senior lecturer in criminology in the Monash University School of Social Sciences, argues that legal definition (see Legal concept of consent) needs to be universal, so as to avoid confusion in legal decisions. He also demonstrates how the moral notion of consent does not always align with the legal concept. For example, some adult siblings or other family members may voluntarily enter into a relationship, however the legal system still deems this as incestual, and therefore a crime. Roffee argues that the use of particular language in the legislation regarding these familial sexual activities manipulates the reader to view it as immoral and criminal, even if all parties are consenting. Similarly, some minors under the legal age of consent may knowingly and willingly choose to be in a sexual relationship. However, the law does not view this as legitimate. While there is a necessity for an age of consent, it does not allow for varying levels of awareness and maturity. Here it can be seen how a moral and a legal understanding do not always align.

Some individuals are unable to give consent, or even if they can verbally indicate that they consent, they are deemed to lack the ability to make informed or full consent (e.g., minors below the age of consent or an intoxicated person). People may also consent to unwanted sexual activity.

=== Implied and explicit ===
In Canada, implied consent has not been a defence for sexual assault since the 1999 Supreme Court of Canada case of R v Ewanchuk, where the court unanimously ruled that consent has to be explicit, instead of merely "implied". In the United States, the defense may have a chance to convince the court that consent was in some way implied by the victim. Many actions can be perceived by the court as implied consent: having a previous relationship with the alleged rapist (e.g. befriending, dating, cohabitating, or marrying), consenting to sexual contact on previous occasions, flirting, or wearing "provocative" clothing.

=== Unwanted sexual activity ===
Unwanted sexual activity can involve rape or other sexual assault, but it may also be distinguished from them. Jessie V Ford, the author of a 2018 study that showed that men are having unwanted sex with women to "prove they are not gay", states that "[a]ll sexual assault is unwanted sex, but not all unwanted sex is sexual assault."

A 1998 study showed that both men and women "consen[t] to unwanted sexual activity" in heterosexual dating; in these cases, they consented to unwanted sex to satisfy their partner, "promote intimacy", or avoid tension in the relationship. The authors argue that estimates of "unwanted (nonconsensual) sexual experiences" may confound nonconsensual sex and consensual sex.

=== Verbal vs. nonverbal ===
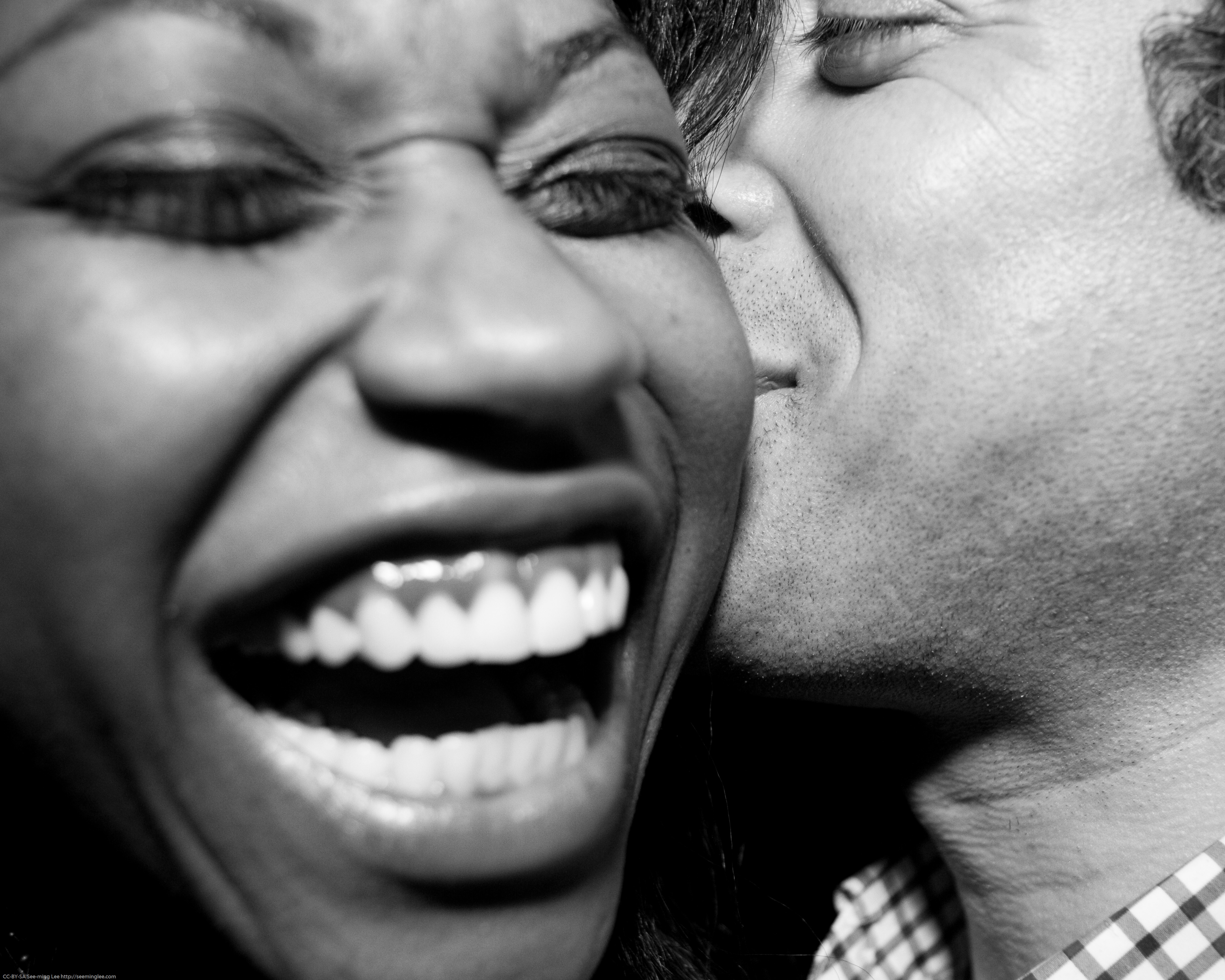
While different consent policies have differing views on whether non-verbal cues count as consent, some rules do permit seeking consent through non-verbal communication.

There can be verbal or nonverbal consent, or a mix of the two types, depending on different policies and laws. According to Bustle writer Kae Burdo, the maxim "only verbal consent counts" is limited, in that it fails to accommodate parties that can only consent non-verbally, such as people with disabilities and those in BDSM communities . Dartmouth College's rules on consent state that a communication in intimate encounters is often nonverbal cues such as smiling, nodding, and touching another person; however, it states that "...body language often isn't enough" because interpreting body language is risky, so the best option is to use "explicit verbal communication". The New York Times reports that men typically use nonverbal indicators to determine consent (61 percent say they perceive consent through a partner's body language), but women typically wait till a partner verbally asks them before they indicate consent (only 10 percent say they indicate consent through body language), a differing approach that may lead to confusion in heterosexual couples' encounters.

Mary Spellman, the dean of students at Claremont McKenna College, states that her college allows either verbal or non-verbal consent, with non-verbal consent being assessed by looking at whether the other person is "actively participating" and touching the other person when he is touching her or encouraging the first person", signs which indicate that a "...person is an active participant in whatever is going on."

The Daily Dot states that verbal consent is best because both participants can clearly indicate what they want, ask questions and seek clarification; in contrast, nonverbal consent may not be clear, as people "...have different understandings of gestures, "vibes," and nonverbal cues", which can lead to "ambiguity and misunderstanding". Lisa Feldman Barrett, a psychologist and neuroscientist, states that in a sexual consent context, "[f]ace and body movements aren't a language" that participants can rely on, because the human "brain is always guessing" about how to interpret smiles and expressions; as such, "...facial movements are terrible indicators of consent, rejection and emotion in general" and they are "not a replacement for words."

A 2026 study found that many young heterosexual men find verbal requests for consent "awkward, unnecessary, or disruptive". On the one hand, this was because seeking verbal consent could turn off or offend a prospective partner. On the other hand, verbal consent could feel meaningless and transactional and offered no guarantee that the prospective partner actually wanted to have sex. The authors, Jossy Forrest of the University of Melbourne, and Jessie V Ford of Columbia University, identified that many young men instead use a process called "multi-factor authentication". Instead of necessarily asking for verbal consent, young men pieced together an accumulation of factors - sensory signals, trust, location, timing, and other contextual factors - to determine whether consent was present.

=== Age ===
Minors below a certain age, age of sexual consent in that jurisdiction, are deemed not able to give valid consent by law to sexual acts. The age of consent is the age below which a minor is considered to be legally incompetent to consent to sexual acts. Consequently, an adult who engages in sexual activity with a minor younger than the age of consent cannot claim that the sexual activity was consensual, and such sexual activity may be considered statutory rape. The person below the minimum age is regarded as the victim and his or her sex partner is regarded as the offender, unless both are underage. The purpose of setting an age of consent is to protect an underage person from sexual advances. Age of consent laws vary widely from jurisdiction to jurisdiction, though most jurisdictions set the age of consent in the range 14 to 18. The laws may also vary by the type of sexual act, the gender of the participants or other considerations, such as involving a position of trust; some jurisdictions may also make allowances for minors engaged in sexual acts with each other, rather than a single age.

Jennifer A. Drobac, who teaches law at Indiana University, says that young adults aged 16 to 21 should only be able to "offer "assent" to sex with a significantly older person", rather than consent, but permit them to retroactively void that assent before they reach a second landmark age - courts would then validate the revocation on a "best interests" basis, and the older party could then be sued, the "assent" would not be admissible. Drobac summarizes that the older person would face a "massively heightened" risk.

=== Mental disabilities or conditions ===
Likewise, persons with Alzheimer's disease or similar disabilities may be unable to give legal consent to sexual relations even with their spouse. New York does not consider it to be consent in cases where people have a physical disability that makes them unable to communicate that they do not consent, either using words or physically or if they have a mental illness or other mental condition that makes them unable to understand the sexual activity. South Carolina has a 10-year penalty for a person who has sex with a person who is mentally challenged or incapable of movement. Law professor Deborah Denno argues that people with some types of mental challenges should be able to consent to sex; she says they "...have the right to do so, and unnecessarily broad and moralistic restrictions infringe upon that right".

=== Intoxication ===
In some jurisdictions, individuals who are intoxicated from alcohol or drugs cannot consent. For example, Michigan Criminal Sexual Conduct Laws states that it is a crime to have sex with a "mentally incapacitated" person who cannot control their conduct or consent. In Canada, intoxication is a factor that affects whether a person can legally consent to sexual activity. However, the level of intoxication that will make consent impossible varies according to circumstances, which include how intoxicated the person is and whether they voluntarily consumed the alcohol or drugs. There was public outrage after a Canadian judge ruled that an intoxicated person can consent; however, a legal expert interviewed by CBC stated that "a drunken consent is still a consent" under Canadian law. A study found the threshold for drunken consent can have some level of ambiguity.

=== Unconsciousness ===
In Canada, a judge ruled in the 2011 R v JA case that a person who is asleep or unconscious cannot consent to sex. The Supreme Court of Canada has ruled that a person drunk to the point of unconsciousness cannot consent to sex; the court ruled that once a person loses consciousness, they cannot consent.

=== Position of trust or authority ===
When determining if a sexual encounter was consensual, Canadian courts will consider if the accused was abusing their "position of trust or authority" regarding the complainant, as this undermines consent. While this general principle is part of Canadian law, the courts are debating exactly what the definition of a position of trust and authority is. Some examples of people in positions of trust or authority include a teacher, employer or boss, camp counselor, health care professional, or coach.

=== Deception and deceit ===
Sexual encounters where one party uses deception or deceit to obtain consent could be non-consensual. As such, if A gives consent to have sex with B, but B has lied about a pertinent issue, A has not given fully informed consent. Deception could include false statements about using contraception, age, gender, whether one is married, religion or employment, sexually transmitted infections testing status, giving the impression that one is someone's partner, or that one is single, and falsely making the person think that a sexual activity is some type of medical procedure. Examples include a California man who snuck into the bedroom of an 18-year-old woman right after her boyfriend left the bedroom, so she thought he was her boyfriend; an Israeli man who lied and told a woman he was a pilot and a medical doctor to have sex with her; and a US man who falsely claimed to be an NFL football player as a way to get sexual encounters.

In Alexandra Sims' article entitled "Trans people could 'face rape charges' if they don't declare sexual history, warns trans activist", she states that the UK Sexual Offences Act requires transgender people to tell partners about their gender history as part of its requirements that people making sexual consent decisions have access to information so that they can make informed consent about whether to have sex; trans activist Sophie Cook states that the law is an infringement on trans peoples' human rights and on their privacy.

=== Sexual coercion ===
Professors Cindy Struckman-Johnson, David Struckman-Johnson, and Peter B. Anderson sociologically define sexual coercion as when an individual engages in sexual activity as a result of "continual arguments, pressure, or abused authority" even with little to no genuine desire to do so. They state that their classification of sexual coercion Levels 3 and 4, purposely intoxicating or using physical force, meet the legal definition of rape in many American states, while Levels 1 and 2, such as changing the receiver's mind through persistent touching or repeated requests, do not. In the State of California, the standard for coercion in law is "a direct or implied threat of force, violence, danger, or retribution sufficient to coerce a reasonable person of ordinary susceptibilities to perform an act which otherwise would not have been performed, or acquiesce in an act to which one otherwise would not have submitted".

Tactics primarily used in an attempt to convince someone to have sexual relations with the initiator are persistent kissing and touching, repeated requests, emotional manipulation, and intoxication. Some of these tactics alone would be considered sexual harassment. Although someone can use these techniques to manipulate a prospective partner into sexual activity, men are more likely to use these techniques than women.

There is an increase in prevalence of sexual coercion due to the sociocultural environment with people, especially adolescents, having constant exposure to sex and sexual themes through mainstream media and the internet. This results in sex and consent being seen as more of an informal activity, instead of something that needs specific communication. The sociocultural environment includes gender norms and gender socialization. Boys are raised socially to be dominant and powerful, which affects the way men view their masculinity when their partner doesn't want to engage in sex. Gendered socialization also promotes the expectation that women should be submissive and acquiesce to their partner's wishes. These strict gender norms promote the use of sexual coercion by men as a normal part of heterosexual relations. These behaviors are sometimes amplified when the concept of historical sexual relations comes into play. These issues may be further exacerbated within committed relationships because of the assumption that, if someone consented to sexual activity before, they will always consent. When it comes to same-sex relationships, less research has been conducted, but in a sample of gay and lesbian participants 52% reported experiencing at least one incident of sexual coercion within their lifetime.

=== With animals ===
It is widely accepted that non-human animals are unable to give consent. Consent is generally not considered with respect to its legality. Instead, laws that address this make it illegal with exceptions given for animal husbandry and veterinarian practices.

== Education initiatives and policies ==
=== General ===
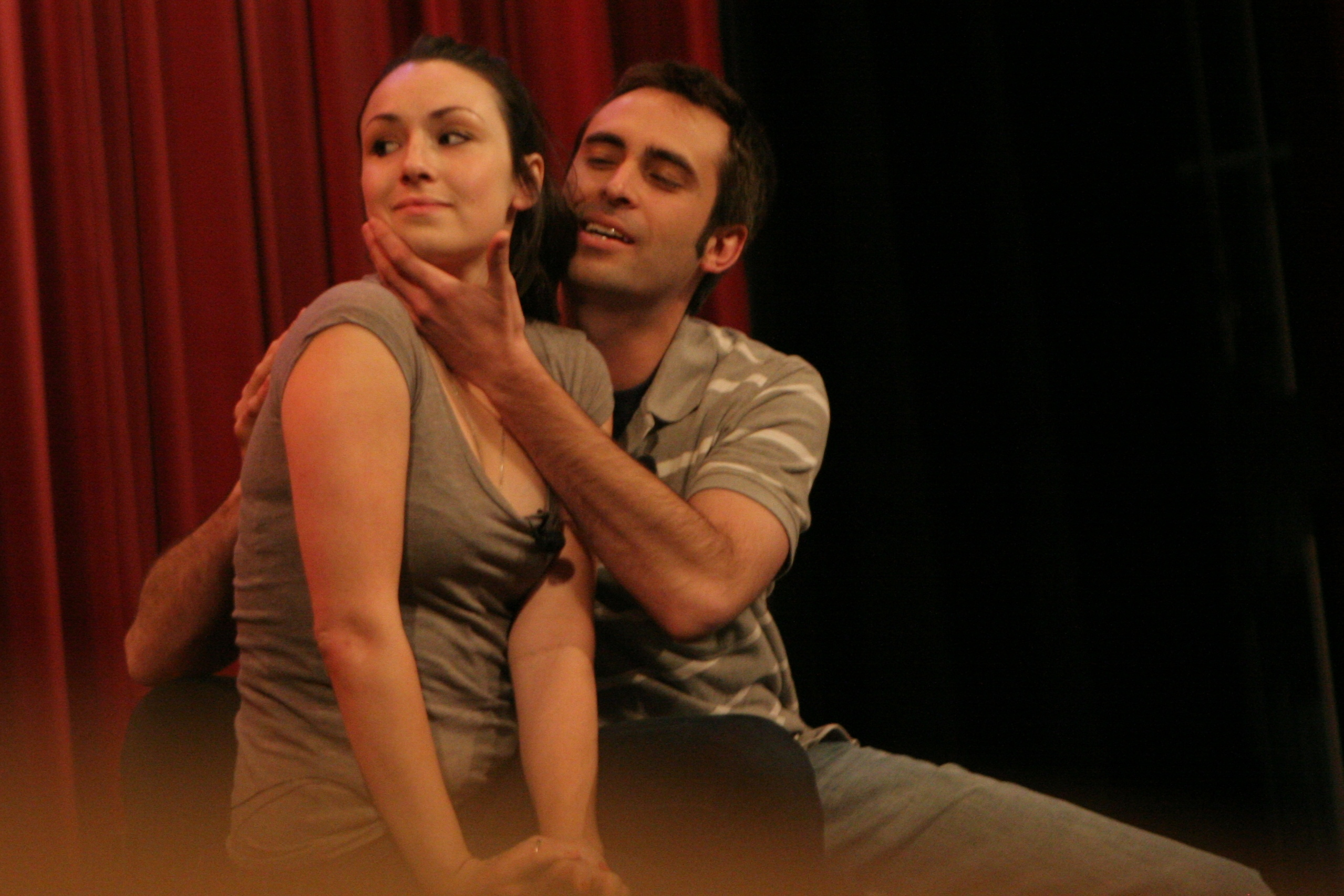
Performers of Catharsis Productions act out scenarios in which a man acts inappropriately toward a woman during the play 'Sex Signals.' The goal of the play is to also help armed forces members understand what consent is and that 'no means no'.

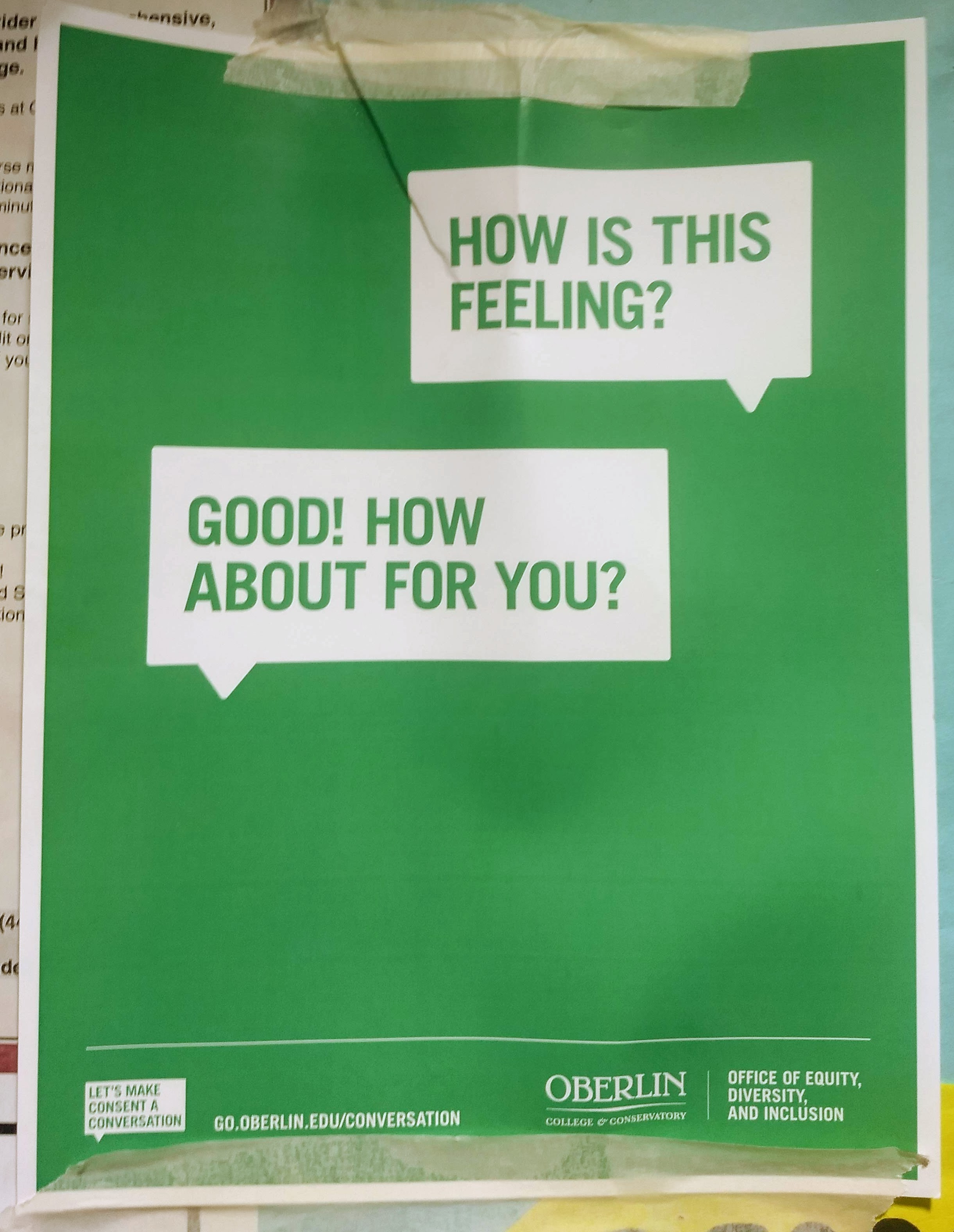
A flyer posted at Oberlin College encourages students to establish ongoing and reciprocal consent during sexual activity.

Initiatives in sex education programs are working towards including and foregrounding topics of and discussions of sexual consent, in primary, high school and college Sex Ed curricula. In the UK, the Personal Social Health and Economic Education Association (PSHEA) is working to produce and introduce Sex Ed lesson plans in British schools that include lessons on "consensual sexual relationships," "the meaning and importance of consent" as well as "rape myths", while the Schools Consent Project delivers sexual education workshops to pupils aged 11–18, covering topics such as harassment, revenge porn and sexting. In the U.S., California-Berkeley University has implemented affirmative and continual consent in education and in the school's policies. In Canada, the Ontario government has introduced a revised Sex Ed curriculum to Toronto schools, including new discussions of sex and affirmative consent, healthy relationships and communication. Many universities have instituted campaigns about consent. Creative campaigns with attention-grabbing slogans and images that market consent can be effective tools to raise awareness of campus sexual assault and related issues.

The Guardian reported that Oxford and Cambridge have added sexual consent workshops; one such workshop included a "quiz about the rates of sexual or gender crimes" and a discussion of three fictional "scenarios of sexual contact", including a story of groping at a party, a relationship in which one partner stopped participating, but the other person, who was sexually excited, continued to proceed to new sex acts, and a case in which a couple was drunk and had sex. The aim of the workshop was to consider if consent was asked for and obtained in these scenarios. While Sydney University has introduced an online sexual consent course, Nina Funnell states that it has been criticized by students, professors and sexual assault prevention leaders as "tokenistic", inexpensive, and ineffective in changing student attitudes or actions.

Some UK universities are launching bystander intervention programs that teach people to intervene when they see potential sexual misconduct situations, for example, by moving a male friend at a party away from an intoxicated woman he is talking to, if she seems unable to consent to his advances. One challenge with bystander education programs is that a study has shown that white female students are less likely to intervene in a hypothetical situation where they see an intoxicated black woman being led towards a bedroom at a party by a non-intoxicated male, as white students feel "less personal responsibility" to help women of colour and they feel that the black woman is deriving pleasure from the situation.

=== "No means no" ===
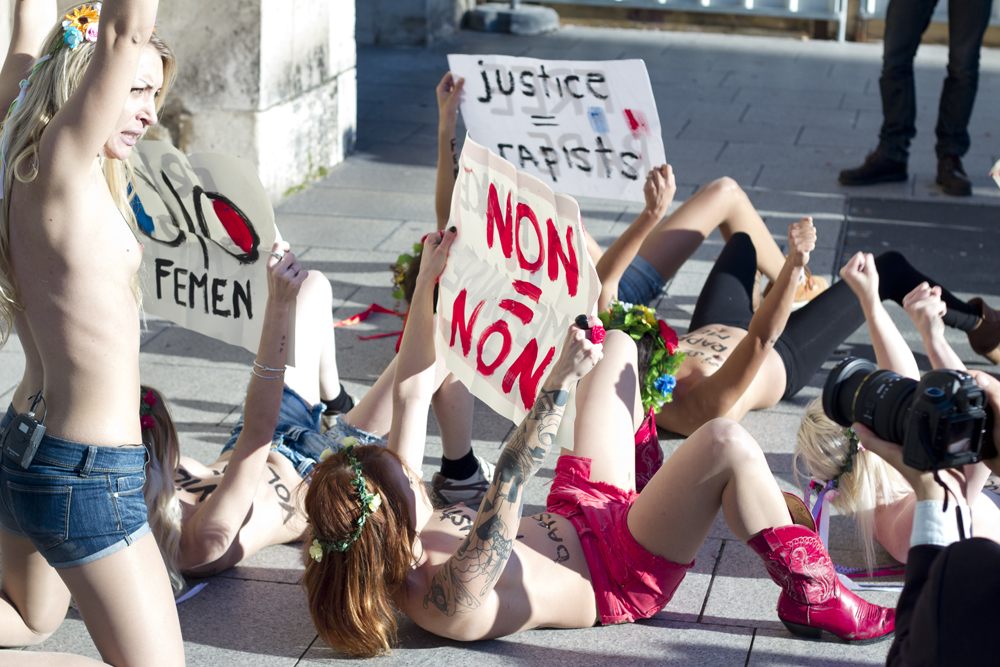
A FEMEN activist holds a sign reading "Non=Non", French for "no=no", at a 2012 protest.

The Canadian Federation of Students (CFS) created the "No Means No" campaign in the 1990s to increase awareness by university students about "sexual assault, acquaintance rape, and dating violence" and decrease the incidence of these issues. The CFS developed a "No Means No" campaign that included research on sexual assault and producing and distributing buttons, stickers, posters and postcards with the slogan and other information. According to the CFS, "No Means No" to set in place a no tolerance approach to sexual violence and harassment and educate students about these issues.

Concerns about the "no means no" approach developed, however, because some people cannot say no, either because they are not conscious, intoxicated or facing threats or coercion, with the coercion issue being especially important in cases where there is a power imbalance between two people in a sexual encounter. To address these concerns, there was a shift from 'no means no' to 'yes means yes' (affirmative consent), to ensure that people were not having sexual actions taken on them due to not speaking up or not resisting. Amanda Hess states that a person may not be able to say no, or they may be intoxicated or passed out, or they may freeze up from fear.

Sherry Colb criticizes the "no means no" approach on the grounds that it makes sexual contact the "default" option when two people have agreed to be in private in a date-like situation, at least until the woman says "no" to the other person's advances. Colb says that under the "no means no" approach, a man who is in private with a woman in a romantic context can undress her and penetrate her if she does not say "no", even if she is staring ahead and saying and doing nothing, which Colb says treats being quiet or not moving as an invitation to sex. She says that under a "no means no" approach, there is not a metaphorical "Do Not Trespass" sign on a woman's body, and as such, women have to fear that accepting a date and being in private with the partner could lead to unwanted sex.

Dr. Ava Cadell suggests that women in sexual encounters tell their partner that they want to use a code expression or safe word to tell the other participant to stop the sexual contact, such as "Code Red". She says the words "no" and "stop" "have been used frivolously, playfully, and teasingly in the past and are not always taken seriously."

=== Affirmative: "yes means yes" ===
A logo for the "yes means yes" campaign.

Affirmative consent ("yes means yes") is when both parties agree to sexual conduct, either through clear, verbal communication or nonverbal cues or gestures. With "yes means yes", a person can still say "no" after an initial yes. "Yes means yes" was developed by a group of women at the US liberal arts school Antioch College in 1991, who "...successfully petitioned for a conduct-code amendment that explicitly defined sexual consent as requiring an enthusiastic "yes" from everyone involved. Prior to this, sex was considered consensual as long as neither party said "no."" (the "no means no" approach). As of 2014, at Antioch College, students must "...get explicit verbal permission before making any sexual advance", asking "'Can I do this?' And the [other] person has to respond verbally, 'Yes.' And if they don't, it's considered nonconsent, and that's a violation of...[college] policy"; a pre-arranged hand signal can also be used if the students made a "prior verbal agreement".

The "yes means yes" approach involves communication and the active participation of people involved. This is the approach endorsed by colleges and universities in the U.S., who describe consent as an "affirmative, unambiguous, and conscious decision by each participant to engage in mutually agreed-upon sexual activity." Claremont McKenna College Dean of Students Mary Spellman says "yes means yes" can be expressed nonverbally by determining "[i]s the [other] person actively participating?...Are they touching me when I am touching them? Are they encouraging me when I'm doing various different things? Those would all be signs that the person is an active participant in whatever is going on."

According to Yoon-Hendricks, a staff writer for Sex, Etc., "Instead of saying 'no means no,' 'yes means yes' looks at sex as a positive thing." Ongoing consent is sought at all levels of sexual intimacy regardless of the parties' relationship, prior sexual history or current activity ("Grinding on the dance floor is not consent for further sexual activity," a university policy reads). By definition, affirmative consent cannot be given if a person is intoxicated, unconscious or asleep.

There are three pillars often included in the description of sexual consent, or "the way we let others know what we're up for, be it a good-night kiss or the moments leading up to sex."

They are:

1. Knowing exactly what and how much I'm agreeing to
2. Expressing my intent to participate
3. Deciding freely and voluntarily to participate

To obtain affirmative consent, rather than waiting to say or for a partner to say "no", one gives and seeks an explicit "yes". This can come in the form of a smile, a nod or a verbal yes, as long as it is unambiguous, enthusiastic and ongoing. Denice Labertew of the California Coalition Against Sexual Assault says that while the words used in "yes means yes" may vary, the main idea is that both people are agreeing to do sex acts. She says that "yes means yes" requires a major change in how we think of sexual assault, as it requires men and women to agree to and actively participate in sex. T.K. Pritchard says that even after consent is given, participants in an encounter should be "constantly checking in", and that there should be checking in before sexual contact, during sex, and after sex, to ensure consent was given. Lauren Larson states that a person should check in with their sex partner before kissing or sex, and also, even during sex, when they change the speed of an action, switch to a different position, or move their hands to a new body area.

Even in a "yes means yes" paradigm, if a partner asks in a way where there is not room for a "no", or if they get a no and then use guilt to manipulate the person, that can be considered sexual coercion rather than consent; other examples include if a partner seeking sex complains that their need for sex is not being met, shows passive-aggressive behaviour, or persistently asks again and again until they get a "yes". Conn Caroll states that social conservatives may support the "yes means yes" laws, as the increased risk of being found guilty of sexual misconduct will lessen student interest in "hook up culture" and create an incentive for men to form long-term, committed relationships with women, rather than just seeking out one-night stands.

2015 Green River College video on consent, endorsing the "only yes means yes" approach on campus

In a Time article, Cathy Young states that the California "yes means yes" law is unlikely to make sexual predators less likely to attack or keep victims safe; she says it creates unclear and capricious rules on sexual activity and moves the burden of proof to those who are accused, who are typically male. Young states that when the San Gabriel Valley Tribune asked a lawmaker how an innocent accused person could prove that he obtained consent, she was told "Your guess is as good as mine." A judge overruled a University of Tennessee-Chattanooga ruling that a male student did not obtain consent; the judge wrote that "...[a]bsent the tape recording of a verbal consent or other independent means to demonstrate that consent was given, the ability of an accused to prove the complaining party's consent strains credulity and is illusory".

Robert Shibley notes that Jonathan Chait has expressed concern that colleges with "yes means yes" rules are removing due process; Shibley argues that fairness and consistency are needed in disciplinary systems; he states that even though college tribunals are not law courts, they still have elements of court trials, as they are based on an allegation, an investigation is done, a hearing is held, evidence is brought forward, sentences are handed down, and there is an appeal that can be made. Shibley states that accused do not have core protections and he states that the college does the investigation, judges the case in the trial, and hears the appeal, which means there is not a separation of functions. Camille Paglia calls "yes means yes" laws "drearily puritanical" and totalitarian. In "Consent: It's Not Sexy", Victoria Campbell criticizes affirmative consent on the grounds that it "...values proof and evidence over the lived experience of those involved" and it turns sex into a contractual activity in a manner akin to the way marriage traditionally provided contractual consent to sex. Sarah Nicole Prickett criticizes affirmative consent because these rules are premised on the idea of feminine passivity; under this cultural paradigm, she says that if a woman shows sexual interest during an encounter, she is seen as "slutty or crazy" or as showing "too much" sexuality.

In "When Saying 'Yes' Is Easier Than Saying 'No'", Jessica Bennett says that one challenge is "gray zone sex" where a woman says yes to an initiator in a sexual encounter when she "desperately" means "no", engaging in what she calls "begrudgingly consensual sex" because saying yes is easier than explaining a "no" or exiting the situation, and because Western culture teaches women to be "'nice' and 'quiet' and 'polite" and to "protect others' feelings" at the expense of the woman's own feelings and desires. Julianne Ross states that in a Western society where sexual narratives focus on male desire, what women want can be deemed less important; as such, in this context, women in heterosexual encounters may feel a pressure to say yes to certain sex acts for fear that they may be criticized as a "prude" if they do not agree, or because the women want to fit into social expectations in their group, or because they are seeking validation.

==== Enthusiastic consent ====
A variant of "yes means yes" consent is enthusiastic consent. Project Respect states that "'positive sexuality' needs to start with enthusiastic consent" in which a person is as "excited and into someone else's enjoyment" as they are, an engaged partner. Planned Parenthood says that enthusiastic consent can be seen when a partner is "...happy, excited, or energized". In 2018 New South Wales's Minister for the Prevention of Domestic Violence and Sexual Assault, Pru Goward has called for an enthusiastic consent, which has been defined as an approach that helps to ensure that both participants want to be in the encounter. A sexual assault survivor who supports the enthusiastic consent model says that "...if it's not an enthusiastic yes, then it's not enough." Dr Nicola Henry said that "legislating and determining 'enthusiastic' [consent] in a court would be challenging". Benedict Brook defines "enthusiastic consent" as "yes mean yes" with more vigour and with "constant checking in between partners that all is well."

Gaby Hinsliff, writing for The Guardian wrote that "enthusiasm, the unmistakable sense of not being able to keep your hands off each other [in an encounter]...is harder to mistake for anything else. And if it was there, but suddenly evaporates – well, you could always ask what's wrong. If those two words kill the mood dead, it almost certainly wasn't the right mood to start with." In Robyn Urback's article "To McGill activists, a 'yes' doesn't mean consent", she states that the "Forum on Consent hosted at McGill suggests that a meek "yes," or a nonchalant "yes," or a "yes" without emphatic body language does not constitute consent. According to the panel "It must be loud and clear"". Charles Sturt University's sexual consent program leader Isabel Fox, an enthusiastic consent advocate, says that "Our tag [slogan] is 'It is not a yes unless it's a hell yes'."

The "enthusiastic consent" model has been criticized by asexual people and sex workers, as people in these categories may choose to have sex with people even though they are not "particularly wanting it or enjoying it themselves". Lily Zheng states that while enthusiastic consent is good theory, it is a "nightmare in real-life intimacy" and she says that since it cannot "...move beyond guesswork, cues and assumptions [it] plays right into normative — straight, white, cisgender, middle-class — ideas about society", which means it does not work well for Asians, blacks, queer communities and other racial or sexual minorities. Zheng states that the enthusiastic consent model is "so vague" that "determining whether or not a real interaction was "enthusiastic" or not becomes next to impossible". Julianne Ross states that consenting adults may have sex that they both want to have without giving "enthusiastic consent", such as couples having sex to get pregnant or couples who want to please each other. One challenge with getting people to give enthusiastic consent in the bedroom is that women may be reticent to speak about their sexual desires because of a fear that they may be "slut-shamed".

=== "Tea Consent" ===
A widely acclaimed educational video about sexual consent is "Tea Consent", created in 2015 by Blue Seat Studios, a Providence, Rhode Island–based non-profit using hand-drawn animation seeking to teach serious subjects with humour and compassion. Written by Emmeline May (alias Rockstar Dinosaur Pirate Princess), drawn by Rachel Brian, and originally voiced by Graham Wheeler, the video uses offering someone a cup of tea as an analogy to asking if someone wants to have sex. It explains that person A should not force person B to drink tea, even if B previously wanted tea or was not sure yet if they wanted tea, and that B cannot answer the question of whether they (still) want tea if they are unconscious. "Tea Consent" was originally produced for an awareness campaign of Thames Valley Police and Thames Valley Sexual Violence Prevention Group, and several versions of it (especially with a British accent, leading to connections with British humour and the perceived Britishness of tea) were subsequently picked up by numerous sex educators, universities, governmental organisations, sexual violence prevention groups and rape crisis centres, and endorsed by celebrities. Praised for using simplicity, clarity and humour in tackling a serious topic, it received several awards, had been translated into 25 languages and viewed at least 75 million times by October 2016, and was later viewed approximately 150 million times across platforms according to Blue Seat Studios. Samantha Pegg argued that "Tea Consent" has its limitations, as it does not address scenarios such as drunken consent, conditional consent, youth, disability or abuse of trust, but 'the value of getting the basics of consent out to a wider audience cannot be underestimated.'

By contrast, an April 2021 video called "Moving the Line" by the Good Society commissioned by the Australian government for sex education in schools, which uses milkshake to explain consent, was widely criticised by experts, campaigners and politicians. Key elements in the negative responses were confusion, lack of clarity and no explicit mention of sex, leading the video's humour and message to be misunderstood. Several commentators argued that "Tea Consent" set a much better example. The milkshake video was subsequently removed.

=== FRIES ===
In August 2016, the U.S. sex education organisation Planned Parenthood coined the acronym "FRIES" to sum up essential elements of consent:

Understanding consent is as easy as FRIES. Consent is:

- Freely given. Doing something sexual with someone is a decision that should be made without pressure, force, manipulation, or while drunk or high.
- Reversible. Anyone can change their mind about what they want to do, at any time. Even if you've done it before or are in the middle of having sex.
- Informed. Be honest. For example, if someone says they'll use a condom and then they don't, that's not consent.
- Enthusiastic. If someone isn't excited, or really into it, that's not consent.
- Specific. Saying yes to one thing (like going to the bedroom to make out) doesn't mean they've said yes to others (like oral sex).

By 2020, several British universities had adopted the FRIES concept.

=== Unintended consequences of consent education ===
A 2026 qualitative study of young men aged 18-32 found that the young men:

- Could cite a conventional definition of consent.
- Struggled to apply that definition in complex or ambiguous sexual encounters.
- Instead relied on an intuitive consent ("multi-factor authentication") in which consent is inferred from the accumulation of a number of consent-indicative factors: mutuality (reciprocated, escalating sensory cues) combined with contextual indicators such as trust, timing, location, and occasional verbal check-ins during and sometimes after sex.

The study authors, from the University of Melbourne, Columbia University, and the University of Oxford also found that concerns about getting consent wrong contributed to young men approaching sex "as a hazard manage rather than a relational experience to share". In particular, the young men:

- experienced sex as a space of anxiety and vigilance, describing fear, nervousness, and a state of constant self-monitoring during sexual encounters;
- sought to avoid causing harm and approached sex with a sense of responsibility for the other person's experience, often prioritising their partner's comfort above their own; and
- described shame arising from formal and informal accusation of wrongdoing with consequences that could be severe and irreversible, as well as from self-criticism.

The authors observed that "a cultural suspicion of men appears to have been internalised by some young men" and concluded that consent education may need to be recalibrated:

Consent education that emphasizes only what young men must do—ask, listen, make sure—risks producing men who experience sex as a problem to be solved rather than a relationship to enter into. Education that names mutuality and trust as the heart of consensual sex, and that addresses the pressure to perform, may better support what these young men say they want but cannot find. Such trust is grounded in the partner’s independence and integrity, and in shared responsibility—not in flawless performance. Education that engages young men’s actual concerns—peer reputation and harm to a partner—may have more traction than education focused on legal consequences.

== Legislation ==
World overview of sexual violence legislation. Consent-based legislation; marital rape illegal Coercion-based legislation; marital rape illegal Consent-based legislation, but marital rape legal Coercion-based legislation, and marital rape legal Mixed legislation; rape without coercion considered a lesser crime; marital rape illegal Coercion-based on vaginal sex, consent-based on anal and oral sex; marital rape illegal

In legal theory, there are two main models in legislation against rape and other forms of sexual violence:

1. The coercion-based model 'requires that the sexual act was done by coercion, violence, physical force or threat of violence or physical force in order for the act to amount to rape';
2. The consent-based model 'requires that for the act to qualify as rape there must be a sexual act that the other one did not consent to'.

The primary advantage of the coercion-based model is that it makes it difficult to make a false accusation of rape or assault, and thus provides decent protection to the legal position and social reputation of suspects who are innocent. The consent-based model has been advocated as a better alternative for enhanced legal protection of victims, and to place a larger responsibility on potential perpetrators to actively verify or falsify before initiating sex whether a potential victim actually consents to initiating sex or not, and abstaining from it as long as they do not.

On 15 June 1992, the second Mulroney government under the direction of Minister of Justice Kim Campbell passed a no-means-no bill into law.

In 2003, the European Court of Human Rights ordered all 47 Member states of the Council of Europe (CoE) to take a consent-based approach to cases of sexual violence on the grounds of Article 3 and Article 8 of the European Convention on Human Rights; this was the result of its ruling in the M.C. v. Bulgaria case. The Protocol to the African Charter on Human and Peoples' Rights on the Rights of Women in Africa (Maputo Protocol) was adopted by the African Union in 2003 (in effect since 2005), which recognised 'unwanted sex' separately from 'forced sex' as a form of violence against women that is to be effectively prohibited by all 55 member states.

In the 2006 Miguel Castro-Castro Prison v. Peru case, applying to all 35 Member states of the Organization of American States, the Inter-American Court of Human Rights stated the following: 'The Court, following the line of international jurisprudence and taking into account that stated in the Convention to Prevent, Punish, and Eradicate Violence against Women [Belém do Pará Convention], considers that sexual violence consists of actions with a sexual nature committed with a person without their consent (...)'.

The Council of Europe's 2011 Convention on preventing and combating violence against women and domestic violence (Istanbul Convention) contains a consent-based definition of sexual violence in Article 36. This mandates all Parties that have ratified the convention to amend their legislation from a coercion-based to a consent-based model.

As of 2018, a consensus is emerging in international law that the consent-based model is to be preferred, stimulated by inter alia the CEDAW Committee, the UN Handbook for Legislation on Violence against Women, the International Criminal Court and the Istanbul Convention. However, there were no internationally agreed upon legal definitions of what constitutes sexual consent; such definitions were absent in human rights instruments.

In June 2020, the Swedish National Council for Crime Prevention (Brå) reported that the number of rape convictions had increased from 190 in 2017 to 333 in 2019, a rise of 75% after Sweden adopted a consent-based definition of rape in May 2018. Brå was positively surprised by this greater-than-expected impact, saying 'this has led to greater justice for victims of rape,' and hoping it would improve social attitudes towards sex.

According to the Indian Evidence Act, in a rape trial, if a woman claims there was no consent to the sexual act then the Court presumes that consent was absent.

== Responses ==
=== Consent contracts ===
In 2003, sex therapist Dr. Ava Cadell suggested that celebrities and professional athletes ask partners in sexual encounters (she uses the slang term "groupies") to sign a sexual consent form, which she calls the sexual encounter equivalent of the prenuptial agreements that are signed before some marriages. Dr. Cadell says that like a prenup, a sex contract can reduce litigation. In 2015 advocacy group the Affirmative Consent Project provided 'sexual consent kits' at US universities. The kits include a contract which the parties can sign, stating that they consent to having sexual relations. The kits suggest that the couple take a photo of themselves holding the contracts.

NYU law professor Amy Adler commented about the depiction of consent contracts in the novel Fifty Shades of Grey; she states the signing of the legal contract before sex could help to avoid uncertainty in sexual encounters. In Emma Green's article about the film, entitled "Consent Isn't Enough: The Troubling Sex of Fifty Shades", she disagrees with consent contracts as a solution on the grounds that "even explicit consent" may not be enough in hard-drinking college dorm environments where most students have little experience with negotiating sexual permission.

Toronto sexual consent educator Farrah Khan disagrees with the idea of consent involving a signature on a contract, as she argues that it is an "ongoing conversation" that involves listening to one's sexual partner. David Llewellyn, who started the Good Lad Initiative at Oxford University, says that consent contracts could give participants the mistaken sense that once the consent contract is signed, they cannot withdraw consent and stop the encounter. Llewellyn states that even with a signed consent contract, both partners should ensure ongoing enthusiastic consent to sex, because he says consent is fluid and changeable.

=== Consent apps ===
In the 2010s, smartphone apps have been developed to give couples the ability to electronically consent to sexual relations. Apps include We-Consent, Sa-Sie, LegalFling and Good2Go. LegalFling uses blockchain and sets out each person's terms and conditions, such as requiring condom use or agreeing to specific acts. However, concerns have been raised about these "consent apps". The Good2Go app gives a record of sexual consent that the company claims can be used as evidence of consent and capacity, from an intoxication perspective, for consent; however, the app was removed from sale because both men and women did not like clicking on a smartphone in the bedroom to record their consent. A lawyer states that legally, apps are redundant and could only serve as circumstantial evidence, because they generally do not take into account a person's right to withdraw consent at any point in the sexual interaction.

In Reina Gattuso's article entitled "Seven reasons consent apps are a terrible idea", she criticizes consent apps on the grounds that: a person can withdraw consent at any point, including minutes after clicking yes on the app; the binary yes or no approach of the apps simplifies the complexity of consent; the app cannot legally confer agreement to each change in sex acts; they make consent too much about legal proofs and setting down evidence; and they change what should be a continuous process of communication into a quick action. Cricket Epstein states that using consent apps have a "victim-blaming" mentality that suggests that the person who is asked to click on the app may become a false accuser; as well, she says the app may protect perpetrators, because once agreement is clicked on the app, it will be harder for a complainant to say that she or he had sex acts done without consent.

=== Consent culture ===
Activists and educators promote "consent culture" by setting up consent education programs to publicize issues and provide information, hiring consent educators (or volunteers), using consent captains or consent guardians in entertainment venues, and introducing initiatives such as safety code words for bar patrons experiencing unwanted sexual attention. Some activists on campus hold "consent days" where there are panels and discussions on sexual consent and hand out t-shirts and condom packages with pro-consent messaging to build awareness. At Whitman College, students founded All Students for Consent, which answers students' questions about seeking consent in intimate encounters.

==== Consent educators ====
The US non-profit organization Speak About It (SAI) hires consent educators to lead workshops on "sex, sexuality, relationships, consent, and sexual assault" for high-school and college students. SAI consent educators have included gender studies and women's studies students, university graduates interested in social justice, sexual health educators, domestic violence prevention advocates, and theater professionals. SAI's hiring for the consent educator positions is inclusive of diverse "gender identities, racial backgrounds, sexual orientations, and sexual experiences." Yale University hires Communication and Consent Educators, who are students who lead workshops and training and start conversations about sex and consent.

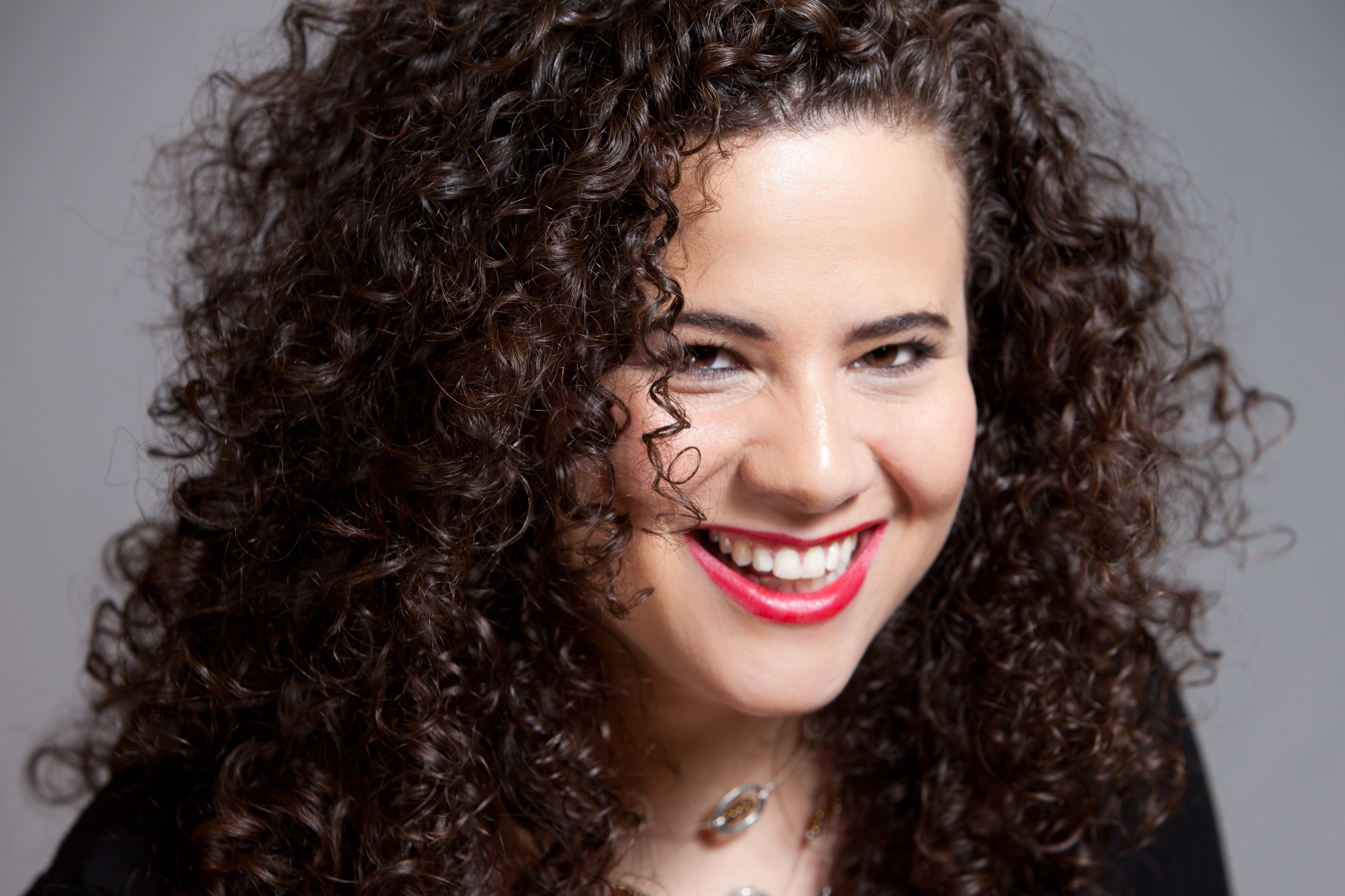
Jaclyn Friedman is a sexual consent educator known for editing Yes Means Yes: Visions of Female Sexual Power and a World Without Rape.

In January 2018, sexual consent educator Jaclyn Friedman wrote an article about the news commentary regarding comedian Aziz Ansari and sexual consent. Friedman called for the need to "better educate young people in this country about sex, consent, and pleasure" by using consent education to teach about sexual communication, awareness of body language, and the need for checking in (if it not clear that the partner is enjoying the activities). The Consent Academy in Seattle is a collective of sex therapists, counsellors and educators who teach "consent culture", provide one-one-one consultations, review consent policies, and provide "consent advocates" for hire.

==== Consent staff in venues ====
The Victoria Event Center has hired Tanille Geib, a sexual health educator/intimacy coach, to serve as Canada's first "consent captain" and stop sexual harassment and sexual assault at social activities. The consent captain intervenes if she sees people who are getting stared at, harassed, or touched without consent. She talks to the person who is feeling uncomfortable and then, if the first person agrees, speaks to the individual whose conduct is unwanted.

Like a regular bouncer, the consent captain warns the person engaging in unwanted behavior that those acts are not tolerated in the venue; if the unwanted acts continue, she may "eventually ask them to leave". The consent captain also checks on people who are intoxicated, to prevent people from taking advantage of their impaired state. Since the consent captain is, in this case, a sexual health educator, she is better able to notice risk situations regarding consent and harassment that regular bouncers might not notice. Geib says that since the #Me Too movement, people have become aware that "there's this whole grey cloud area around what acting in consent and consensual relationships are." Geib says that her role is not to police the patrons, but is rather to start conversations about creating a "consent culture".

In Seattle, the Consent Academy hires out "consent advocates" for events and parties, who act to deter incidents and to help those who experience unwanted contact.

The House of Yes nightclub hired a "consenticorn", a staffer who acts as a "dance-floor monitor" (also called a "consent guardian") for the venue. The consenticorns roam the venue during the sex-themed party wearing a lighted unicorn horn (to aid guests in finding the consent staffer), distribute condoms and ensure that guests comply with the rules on condom use and mandatory "express, verbal consent" for all physical contact. The consenticorns were trained by Emma Kaywin, a sexual-health educator; the goal is not to "police but [rather] to educate" the clubgoers. Arwa Mahdawi from The Guardian praised the House of Yes' initiative, saying the "...stricter we are about consent, the more fun everyone can have."

Slovenian philosopher Slavoj Žižek states that the consenticorn approach does not understand "human sexuality" as these venues are "creating spaces that fail to acknowledge the nuances of intimacy and pleasure" by enforcing "tight control" that is delegated to an "external hired controller". As well, Žižek asks how the consent guardians will be able to tell the difference between "consensual sadomasochism" and "exploitative" behaviour.

==== Safety code words ====
For bar patrons who are feeling uncomfortable with the behaviour of their date, such as a person who is getting touched without their consent, some venues have a safety code system that enables patrons to alert staff. Some bars have posters in washrooms and drink coasters informing patrons that if they need to signal a bartender that they feel unsafe with their date (or any other bar patron), they can use a codeword (a fictional mixed drink name, for example), and then bar staff will escort the patron out of the venue to make sure they get safely to their taxi. Ask for Angela, founded in Lincolnshire in 2016, is, as of 2026, an international scheme.

=== Intimacy coordinator ===
In the television and film industry, in 2018, some production companies began hiring an "intimacy coordinator" to ensure that actors' and actresses' consent is obtained before shooting romantic scenes and simulated sex scenes. To address concerns about the "vulnerability...and the massive power balance that can happen when a powerful showrunner or director asks an actress or actor...to get naked and simulate sex for the camera", HBO hires an intimacy coordinator for these scenes. The intimacy coordinator is a mix of an acting coach (who makes sure that scenes look realistic) and an advocate for actors and actresses who ensures that the onscreen performers' boundaries are respected and that their physical and emotional comfort is protected.

== Other views ==
Legal scholar Robin West stated in a 2000 article that the use of consent as an ethical premise for life decisions may increase happiness in the world, except for women. She states that women technically consent to many of the life experiences that lead to misery for women, such as pregnancies they did not wish to have, marriages to spouses who beat them, or jobs where a boss sexually harasses them, since they consented to the sex, marriage or taking the job, respectively (even if they did not want the adverse results, such as on-the-job harassment). West states that if we make consent the key ethical standard in life, then all of these negative experiences for women will be not able to be criticized, as people will say that the woman chose of her own free will to enter that situation.

Donna Oriowo states that "...when we talk about consent, we very rarely are talking about black women or women of color", and the focus is usually on white women, with black women accusers continuing to face doubt and blame due to tropes depicting black women as "...over-sexed and only want[ing] sex." Some younger feminists argue that consent is not truly possible when there is a power disparity between partners in an encounter; Laura Kipnis disagrees, arguing that it is "...precisely the dynamics of power—of status, money, appearance, age, talent—that create desire" between people in a sexual context, with desire being one of the elements Kipnis thinks we should focus on.

Kate Lockwood Harris argues that consent initiatives, such as "no means no" and "yes means yes" use views about communication which she sees as false myths, such as the claim that communication during sex can and should be a binary, unambiguous "no" or "yes". Harris states that by calling for this type of response, anti-assault advocates are lowering the complexity of communication competence between the two people and lessening the opportunities to make consent a political act.

Jed Rubenfeld of Yale Law School wrote in a review that consent should not be the main criterion to judge whether a sexual contact is legal or not. First, in stark contrast to other legal areas (e.g. qualification for a mortgage or an insurance, see misrepresentation), there is generally no requirement to be truthful before obtaining sexual consent. Though rape by deception is punishable, it usually does not refer to honesty in relationship matters. Likewise, laws do not offer any recourse in case sexual consent has been given based on false premises. His second point is that rape laws intend to protect sexual autonomy, but yet the only thing that can override somebody's autonomy is coercion, or exploiting somebody's incapacitation. By their strict definition, non-consensual situations only imply a disagreement, and thus, they can be resolved by simply walking away. Therefore, in Rubenfeld's view, the defenselessness of a person, or the use (or threat) of force, is the only criterion which can define rape in a logical way. In a reply, Tom Dougherty defends sexual consent, but proposes that any deception that was significant in duping anybody into sexual consent should be punished, as a new kind of sexual crime that is legally separate from abuse and rape.

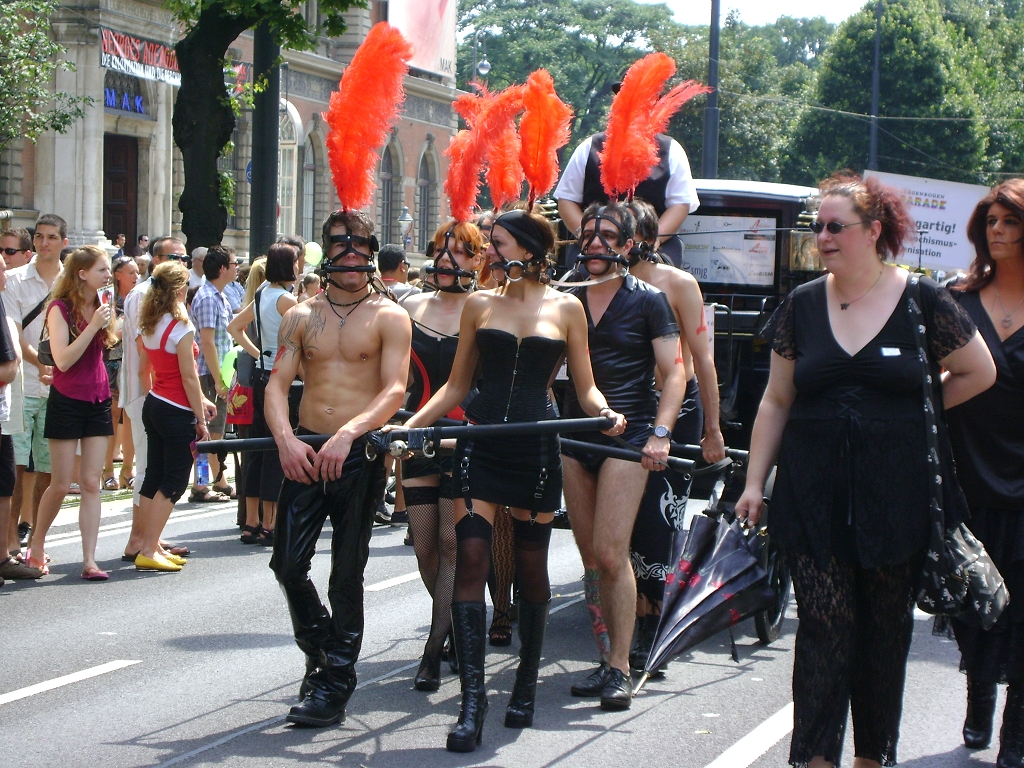
Affirmative consent approaches are not always practiced in BDSM, because in some BDSM encounters, participants agree to "consensual non-consent."

Non-consensual condom removal, also called "stealthing", is the practice of a man covertly removing a condom when his sex partner has only consented to safer condom-protected sex. Alexandra Brodsky wrote an article in the Columbia Journal of Law and Gender calling for "stealthing" to be legally considered as a kind of sexual assault, but also reviewed the difficulties in doing so: In all legal areas, breaking an agreement usually is not considered a crime, and that misrepresenting one's true intentions does not make a sexual act illegal. Thus, the most successful argument for making stealthing punishable would be the inherent pregnancy and infection risk of unprotected intercourse. The women who experienced "stealthing" had to pay for emergency contraception and faced concerns about pregnancy or sexually transmitted infections, and some women felt that it was a type of rape. Stealthing is a type of domestic violence that is called "reproductive coercion"; it includes taking off condoms or poking holes in condoms. In the UK prosecutorial guidance is that such acts may vitiate consent, citing Assange v Sweden and R v Lawrance (R v Lawrance [2020] EWCA Crim 971).

The reversed scenario, in which a woman attempts to become pregnant without the man's consent, is known as "Reverse stealthing" or sperm theft. It can include lying about use of contraception or sabotaging birth control (such as by poking holes in a condom), or self-inseminating with sperm retrieved from a condom. It raises interesting questions in that regard – in normal stealthing, the victim can still seek an abortion, while here, the male partner ends up being victimized twice over as he cannot force her to end her pregnancy, or refuse to make child support payments.

Mia Mercado states that "revenge porn" posted online or otherwise disseminated by former partners without permission and "leaked celebrity [sex] photos" that are hacked or stolen from stars' phones are "non-consensual pornography". She says that these two activities are a "form of sexual assault and should be treated as such", noting that revenge porn is an offence in 34 US states with legislation pending (in 2017) in other states.

Concepts of affirmative consent are more challenging in BDSM encounters, particularly in settings where the participants agree to "consensual non-consent", also called meta-consent and blanket consent, a mutual agreement to be able to act as if consent has been waived. It is an agreement where comprehensive consent is given in advance, with the intent of it being irrevocable under most circumstances. This often occurs without foreknowledge of the exact actions planned. Even if two participants in a BDSM encounter agree that they consent to violence, in Canada, the law limits what violent sexual act people can consent to; specifically, Canadians cannot consent to getting seriously injured.

Ezra Klein supports California's "yes means yes" law for the state's colleges on the grounds that there are too many sexual assaults; as such, he endorses broad new legal measures like California's newly created law. While he acknowledges that the law impinges on the personal sexual lives of people, he says that to work, the new law needs to have "overreach", so that it will create a "cold spike of fear" among college men about whether a sexual encounter is consensual. Klein states that cases where it is unclear whether consent was or was not given will be a necessary part of the law's effectiveness, as these cases will help to reduce sexual assaults, as students become aware of the disciplinary process and the consequences for those found guilty. Freddie deBoer states that if "yes means yes" becomes widespread, it would lead to a lower standard of proof being available to law enforcement and justice institutions which have thus far shown evidence of using racial or class-based prejudice when assessing and trying cases (e.g., driving while black); this could lead to "yes means yes" charges and punishments falling disproportionately on students of color or those from working-class backgrounds.

=== LGBT ===
Michael Segalov states that young gay men do not learn much about consent and sexual boundaries because most "were never taught the language with which to explain or understand" their experiences and there are typically few LGBT+ role models in their community or family to seek advice from. Segalov states that hookup apps may create consent challenges because some men have a feeling of "entitlement" when they arrive at the hookup partner's place, and a sense that the encounter's sexual interaction has been "prearranged" online.

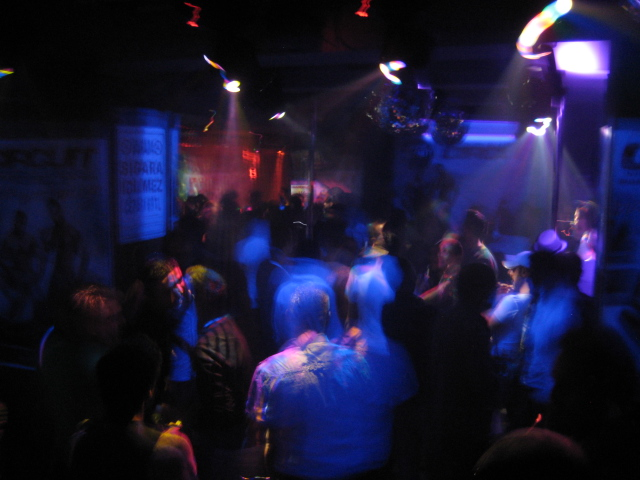
Philip Henry states that non-consensual groping of bottoms and crotches is tolerated in some gay bars.

Christopher Robinson states that some queer "spaces continue to normalize, and even encourage, sexual violence", including "groping, drunk affection, and blatant sexual assault", because the "direct sexualization" in these venues leads some men to view the sexual harassment they commit as a "compliment" to the recipient. Robinson says that the "transgressions [are re-positioned] as charm" by the harassers, with the recipients of the unwanted contact being expected to "ignore and endure" the groping. Robinson says that this atmosphere may undermine the safe space that gay bars were supposed to be providing for queer people.

John Voutos states that for queer people, there are number of challenges with communicating consent, including "[s]ex-on-premises venues, queer clubs", online dating, the "non-verbal, semi-ambiguous communication of the hanky code" (in which a color-coded system indicates preferred sexual fetishes, what kind of sex they are seeking, and whether they are a top/dominant or bottom/submissive) and cruising for sex. Brodie Turner, the organizer of a 2019 Consent Festival, says that the lengthy history of "LGBTIQA+ silencing" and erasure from sex education and the lack of media depictions of "healthy [LGBTIQA+] relationships" mean that LGBTIQA+ people do not know about consent or have a sense that it is their right.

Philip Henry states that the male gay community tolerates and even encourages non-consenting grabbing and groping of butts and crotches in gay venues because the boundaries of consent are blurred in the gay club environment, particularly when there is drinking and semi-nude patrons dancing. He says that when a gay man does experience unwanted groping and expresses concern, he is often told to "calm down" or that groping "comes with the territory" in a gay venue. Gay men in the chemsex scene, where couples or groups consume GHB or crystal meth prior to extensive sex, have stated that consent is not clearly defined and there can be a perception that anyone at a "party and play" get-together is assumed to consent.

In an article in Advocate, Alexander Cheves argues that when a person enters a dark backroom of a gay bar, "you waive a degree of consent", because "[g]ay men go back there to get groped." Cheves states that for people going into a backroom, the onus is on them to "gently push" an unwanted hand away from their body. In "Discussing Consent in Gay Spaces Requires Nuance, Not Sex Panic", Rennie McDougall states that adding modern consent approaches to gay spaces such as gay bars and saunas would have a negative effect on gay men's sexual interactions, because non-consensual but non-threatening hands of a stranger on a bottom, chest or crotch can be a "positive part of sexual discovery" for gay men.

Jo Jackson says that in the queer female community she has had experiences where venue participants put their hands on her body (near her thigh) and touching her breasts without consent, but she said nothing because she felt at the time that these actions were part of "a soft charade of seduction". She states that the queer female community has "butt-grabbing, dudeish remarks, and aggressive, persistent come-ons" and she says there is a sense that being aggressive or using "sexual energy to wield power is...hot". She says some women feel a sense of "entitlement" to touch that blurs the concept of consent. Another issue is that queer women often grow up only exposed to media representations of heterosexual dating, so young queer females may lack a vocabulary for women-on-women dating and an understanding of the social cues for consent.

In "Why Yes Can Mean No", Jordan Bosiljevac states that "yes" does not necessarily mean consent for "...poor, disabled, queer, non-white, trans, or feminine" people; she states that consent approaches are a form of privilege created for well-to-do, hetero, cis, White, able-bodied people. An article about queer students at McGill University states that in queer sexual encounters, there is not a set script of activities, as with heterosexual sex, and queer sex is more exploratory; as such, there are more discussions about consent between queer partners about every step and act. However, Rebecca Kahn states that in queer encounters where one person is cis-gender and one person is trans, the cis person may have more power in the relationship that can give the trans person "...feelings of fear, or more subtly,...a desire to please the more privileged partner" in the encounter; Kahn says that to address these power differentials, the privileged partner should make sure the marginalized person feels comfortable by letting them know that consent is not assumed. Asexual people may feel pressured to consent to having sex when they are in a relationship.

== See also ==
- Age of consent
- Implied consent
- Non-consensual condom removal
- Rape by deception
- Reproductive coercion
- Sperm theft
- Statutory rape
