= Reasons of the Supreme Court of Canada by Justice L'Heureux-Dubé =

This is a list of all the opinions written by Claire L'Heureux-Dubé during her tenure as puisne justice of the Supreme Court of Canada.

== 1987-1988 ==
Case name	Issue	Co-authored by	Joined by
TWU v. British Columbia Telephone Co. [1988] 2 SCR 564		–	
R. v. Jacoy [1988] 2 SCR 548		–	

- New Brunswick (Minister of Health and Community Services) v. C. (G. C.) [1988] 1 SCR 1073 (Majority)

== 1989 ==
- R. v. Duguay, [1989] 1 SCR 93 (Dissent)
- R. v. Howard, [1989] 1 SCR 1337 (Dissent)
- R. v. D. (L.E.), [1989] 2 SCR 111 (Dissent)
- R. v. L. (J.E.), [1989] 2 SCR 510 (Dissent)
- R. v. Nygaard, [1989] 2 SCR 1074

Note: This part of the list is incomplete

== 1990 ==
- R. v. Rodney, [1990] 2 SCR 687 (Dissent)
- R. v. Chambers, [1990] 2 SCR 1293 (Dissent)
- R. v. Arkell, [1990] 2 SCR 695
- Stelco inc. v. Canada (Attorney general), [1990] 1 SCR 617
- Knight v. Indian head school division no. 19, [1990] 1 SCR 653
- R. v. Martineau, [1990] 2 SCR 633 (Dissent)
- Harrison v. University of British Columbia, [1990] 3 SCR 451 (Dissent)

Note: This part of the list is incomplete

== 1991 ==
- R. v. Sheridan, [1991] 2 SCR 205
- R. v. Cole, [1991] 1 SCR 904
- R. v. Romeo, [1991] 1 SCR 86
- R. v. Seaboyer; R. v. Gayme, [1991] 2 SCR 577 (concurrence/dissent)

Note: This part of the list is incomplete

== 1992 ==
- Moge v. Moge, [1992] 3 S.C.R. 813
- Lapointe v. Hôpital Le Gardeur, [1992] 1 SCR 382
- R. v. Murdock, [1992] 2 SCR 164
- R. v. J. (M.A.), [1992] 2 SCR 166
- R. v. Bennett, [1992] 2 SCR 168
- R. v. Forster, [1992] 1 SCR 339 (Dissent)
- R. v. Comeau, [1992] 3 SCR 473

Note: This part of the list is incomplete

== 1993 ==
- R. v. Brown, [1993] 2 SCR 918 (Dissent)
- Haig v. Canada, [1993] 2 S.C.R. 995
- Canada (Attorney General) v. Mossop [1993] 1 SCR 554
- R. v. Brassard, [1993] 4 SCR 287
- Rodriguez v British Columbia (AG) [1993] 3 S.C.R. 519 (Dissent)

Note: This part of the list is incomplete

== 1994 ==
- R. v. H. (L.M.), [1994] 3 SCR 758
- R. v. Pozniak, [1994] 3 SCR 310 (Dissent)
- R. v. Harper, [1994] 3 SCR 343 (Dissent)

Note: This part of the list is incomplete

== 1995 ==
- R. v. M. (N.), [1995] 2 SCR 415
- R. v. U. (F.J.), [1995] 3 SCR 764 (concurrence)

Note: This part of the list is incomplete

== 1996 ==
- R. v. Majid, [1996] 1 SCR 472 (majority)
- R. v. Evans, [1996] 1 S.C.R. 8 (concurrence)
- R. v. Edwards, [1996] 1 S.C.R. 128 (concurrence)
- Gould v. Yukon Order of Pioneers, [1996] 1 S.C.R. 571 (dissent)

Note: This part of the list is incomplete

== 1997 ==
- R. v. Osvath, [1997] 1 SCR 7 (majority)
- R v Leipert, [1997] 1 S.C.R. 281 (concurrence)
- R v Carosella, [1997] 1 S.C.R. 80 (dissent)
- Toronto (City of) Board of Education v Ontario Secondary School Teachers' Federation, District 15, [1997] 1 S.C.R. 487 (concurrence)
- R v Stillman, [1997] 1 S.C.R. 607 (dissent)
- R v Melnichuk, [1997] 1 S.C.R. 602 (Dissent)
- R. v. Melnichuk, [1997] 1 SCR 602 (Dissent)
- Canadian Union of Public Employees, Local 301 v Montreal (City of), [1997] 1 S.C.R. 793 (majority)
- Pointe-Claire (City of) v Quebec (Labour Court), [1997] 1 S.C.R. 1015 (dissent)
- R v La, [1997] 2 S.C.R. 680 (concurrence)
- Hickman Motors Ltd v Canada, [1997] 2 S.C.R. 336 (concurrence)
- R v Feeney, [1997] 2 S.C.R. 13 (dissent)
- R v Greyeyes, [1997] 2 S.C.R. 825 (majority)
- R v Esau, [1997] 2 S.C.R. 777 (dissent)
- R v Cogger, [1997] 2 S.C.R. 845 (majority)
- Pasiechnyk v Saskatchewan (Workers' Compensation Board), [1997] 2 S.C.R. 890 (dissent)
- R v Lifchus, [1997] 3 S.C.R. 320 (concurrence)
- R v S(RD), [1997] 3 S.C.R. 484 (concurrence)
- S(L) v S(C), [1997] 3 S.C.R. 1003 (Majority)
- R v Labrecque, [1997] 3 S.C.R. 1001 (Majority)
- R v Bablitz, [1997] 3 S.C.R. 1005 (Majority)

Note: This part of the list is incomplete

== 1998 ==
- R. v. Maracle, [1998] 1 SCR 86
- R. v. Jussila, [1998] 1 SCR 755
- R. v. Bernier, [1998] 1 SCR 975
- R. v. Abdallah, [1998] 1 SCR 980
- R. v. Daigle, [1998] 1 SCR 1220
- R. v. Wells, [1998] 2 SCR 517

Note: This part of the list is incomplete

== 1999 ==
- R. v. Ewanchuk, [1999] 1 S.C.R. 330 (concur)
- Corbiere v. Canada (Minister of Indian and Northern Affairs), [1999] 2 S.C.R. 203 (Concur)
- R. v. White, [1999] 2 S.C.R. 417
- Hickey v. Hickey, [1999] 2 S.C.R. 518
- Best v. Best, [1999] 2 S.C.R. 868
- Baker v. Canada (Minister of Citizenship and Immigration), [1999] 2 S.C.R. 817
- Delisle v. Canada (Deputy Attorney General), [1999] 2 S.C.R. 989
- New Brunswick (Minister of Health and Community Services) v. G. (J.), [1999] 3 S.C.R. 46 (Concur)
- R. v. W. (G.), [1999] 3 S.C.R. 597
- R. v. F. (W.J.), [1999] 3 S.C.R. 569
- R. v. Brown, [1999] 3 S.C.R. 660
- R. v. Timm, [1999] 3 S.C.R. 666

== 2000 ==
- R. v. L.F.W., [2000] 1 S.C.R. 132; 2000 SCC 6
- R. v. R.N.S., [2000] 1 S.C.R. 149; 2000 SCC 7
- R. v. R.A.R., [2000] 1 S.C.R. 163; 2000 SCC 8
- R. v. A.G., [2000] 1 S.C.R. 439; 2000 SCC 17
- Quebec v. Boisbriand (City), [2000] 1 S.C.R. 665; 2000 SCC 27
- R. v. Starr, [2000] 2 S.C.R. 144; 2000 SCC 40 (dissent)
- R. v. Hamelin, [2000] 2 S.C.R. 273; 2000 SCC 42
- Winnipeg Child and Family Services v. K.L.W., [2000] 2 S.C.R. 519; 2000 SCC 48

== 2001 ==
- R. v. Sharpe, [2001] 1 S.C.R. 45; 2001 SCC 2 (dissent)
- Trinity Western University v. British Columbia College of Teachers, [2001] 1 S.C.R. 772; 2001 SCC 31 (dissent)
- 114957 Canada Ltée (Spraytech, Société d'arrosage) v. Hudson (Town), [2001] 2 S.C.R. 241; 2001 SCC 40 (major)
- Proulx v. Quebec (Attorney General), [2001] 3 S.C.R. 9; 2001 SCC 66 (dissent)
- R. v. Advance Cutting & Coring Ltd., [2001] 3 S.C.R. 209; 2001 SCC 70 (concur)
- R. v. Nette, [2001] 3 S.C.R. 488; 2001 SCC 78 (concur)
- R. v. Golden, [2001] 3 S.C.R. 679; 2001 SCC 83 (dissent)
- Dunmore v. Ontario (Attorney General), [2001] 3 S.C.R. 1016; 2001 SCC 94 (concur)

== 2002 ==
- Lavoie v. Canada, [2002] 1 S.C.R. 769; 2002 SCC 23
- R. v. Burke, [2002] 2 S.C.R. 857; 2002 SCC 55
- Babcock v. Canada (Attorney General), [2002] 3 S.C.R. 3; 2002 SCC 57
- R. v. Shearing, [2002] 3 S.C.R. 33; 2002 SCC 58
- CIBC Mortgage Corp. v. Vasquez, [2002] 3 S.C.R. 168; 2002 SCC 60
- R. v. Noël, [2002] 3 S.C.R. 433; 2002 SCC 67
- Nova Scotia (Attorney General) v. Walsh, [2002] 4 S.C.R. 325; 2002 SCC 83
- Gosselin v. Québec (Attorney General), [2002] 4 S.C.R. 429; 2002 SCC 84
- Prud'homme v. Prud'homme, [2002] 4 S.C.R. 663; 2002 SCC 85
