= Philip Epstein =

Philip Epstein may refer to:

- Philip G. Epstein (1909–1952), American screenwriter
- Philip Michael Epstein (born 1942), Canadian family law lawyer
