= John McClung (judge) =

John W. McClung

Justice of Alberta Court of Appeal
- In office June 30, 1979 – October 21, 2004

Personal details
- Born: July 15, 1935 Edmonton, Alberta
- Died: October 21, 2004 (aged 69) Edmonton, Alberta
- Spouse: Eda (1973)

John Wesley "Buzz" McClung (July 15, 1935 – October 21, 2004) was a historian, lawyer, jurist, and a judge of the Alberta Court of Appeal.

== Early life ==
McClung was born in Edmonton to John Wesley and Lillian Mae (née) Johnston, as the grandson of women's rights activist Nellie McClung, and was left orphaned at the age of 13. He married his wife Eda (née) Matiisen October 26, 1973. He was a member of the United Church, a golfer with a reputation for a formidable short game, and a hunter, especially of waterfowl. "Buzz" was a nickname he carried with him throughout his life since high school.

== Career ==
He earned his Bachelor of Arts degree in 1957 and his Bachelor of Laws degree in 1959, both from the University of Alberta. After being admitted to the Alberta Bar, he became known as one of Canada's top criminal defence lawyers and in the 1970s was ranked amongst the top 10 in Canada by Weekend Magazine. He took silk and became Queen's Counsel in 1973, practicing with the firm of McClung Frohlich and Rand.

In 1976, he was appointed to the District Court of Alberta, then to the Supreme Court of Alberta (trial division) in 1976, and was soon thereafter elevated to the Court of Appeal June 30, 1979. He held this position until he died.

He was an avid student and writer of history. He was a driving force behind the creation of the Heritage Room at the Edmonton Courthouse, a collection of artifacts and photographs of Alberta's legal history, including portraits of prominent Alberta judges and many of his own writings. After his death, the Alberta Court of Appeal renamed the room the J.W. (Buzz) McClung Heritage Room. He wrote often about legal history, including a book entitled Law West of the Bay in 1997. He also wrote a History of the Alberta Court of Appeal published by his fellow appellate justices after he died. He was also a friend and strong supporter of the Heritage Community Foundation.

== Notable decisions and controversy ==
=== Vriend v. Alberta ===
McClung presided over the provincial appeal in Vriend v. Alberta, overturning the trial court's judgment in favour of Delwin Vriend, who had lost his job at a religious college because of his sexual orientation. In a manner uncharacteristic of its criticism of lower court decisions, however, The Supreme Court of Canada excoriated Justice McClung's reasoning for the kind of "neutral difference" approach argued unsuccessfully by the BC Government in its Eldridge decision. In the result, the Court embraced precisely what Justice McClung expressly rejected, and confirmed the trial judge's decision to "read in" to Alberta's Individual's Rights Protection Act sexual orientation as a prohibited ground of discrimination.

=== R. v. Ewanchuk ===
McClung later became a national figure with his "bonnet and crinolines" ruling in the sexual assault case of R. v. Ewanchuk. In his decision, he suggested that the teenage victim provoked her assailant by the way she dressed and the accused's actions were "far less criminal than hormonal" or that the victim could have stopped the assault with a "well-chosen expletive, a slap in the face or, if necessary, a well-directed knee." The case was unanimously overturned by the Supreme Court in 1999 in a decision written by fellow Alberta jurist, Justice Major; a concurring opinion by Quebec jurist, Justice L'Heureux-Dubé described his decision as perpetuating "archaic myths and stereotypes".

In reply, McClung wrote a letter to the National Post attacking L'Heureux-Dubé, describing her writing as overly personal and blaming her attitude for the rise in the suicide rate of Quebec men. This letter drew even more furor when it was pointed out that L'Heureux-Dubé's husband had committed suicide in 1978. McClung apologized in another letter to the National Post, claiming that he was not aware of the situation.
