= Gordon v Goertz =

- Supreme Court of Canada

Hearing: December 6, 1995 Judgment: May 2, 1996
- Full case name: Robin James Goertz (Appellant) v. Janet Rita Gordon (formerly Janette Rita Goertz) (Respondent) and Women's Legal Education and Action Fund (LEAF) and Children's Lawyer of Ontario (Interveners)
- Citations: [1996] 2 S.C.R. 27
- Docket No.: 24622
- Ruling: Appeal Dismissed

Court membership
- Chief Justice: Antonio Lamer; Puisne Justices: Gérard La Forest, Claire L'Heureux-Dubé, John Sopinka, Charles Gonthier, Peter Cory, Beverley McLachlin, Frank Iacobucci, John C. Major

Reasons given
- Majority: McLachlin J., joined by Lamer C.J. and Sopinka, Cory, Iacobucci and Major JJ.
- Concurrence: Gonthier J,
- Dissent: La Forest and L'Heureux‑Dubé JJ

Gordon v Goertz is a 1996 Supreme Court of Canada decision dealing with issues surrounding parental relocation.

== Earlier case law ==
Prior to the 1990 decision of Carter v Brooks, the general view of Canadian courts was that a custodial parent could move with the child unless the access parent could show that the move was harmful to the child. In Carter v Brooks, the Ontario Court of Appeal changed this approach. Instead of having a presumption in favour of the custodial parent, the court held that a move would only be allowed if it was in the best interests of the child. The court rejected putting an onus on either party because it thought that the best interests of the child would best be determined if there were no starting presumptions. The interests of the custodial parent would only be relevant as far as they impacted the interests of the child. Carter made it more difficult for custodial parents to move with their children. In Ontario, the result was that only 60% of moves were allowed. This case was followed in British Columbia and the effect there was likely similar.

The law in Ontario was changed following the decision in MacGyver v Richards, where the court did not reject the best interests of the child test in Carter, but in essence held that there was a presumption that the move was in the best interests of the child. The court recognized the difficulty courts faced in determining the best interests of the child and felt that the custodial parent was usually in a better position to do so. Further, the court found that the interests of the child and custodial parent were linked. The decision led to parents in Ontario being allowed to move with much more frequency. But it caused confusion across Canada regarding the test to be applied in mobility cases. Some provinces followed MacGyver, but British Columbia did not.

== Decision ==
In Gordon, the Supreme Court of Canada cleared up any confusion about whether there should be a presumption in favour of the moving parent. The court set out the law as follows: the party seeking to vary the custody agreement would first have to show that the move would cause a material change in the circumstances of the child. Once this had been established, the judge would embark on a fresh inquiry regarding the best interests of the child. There was to be no presumption in favour of the custodial parent, but his or her views would be entitled to great respect. In deciding the best interests of the child, the judge could consider all factors, but should specifically address the following seven:

1. the existing custody arrangement and relationship between the child and the custodial parent;
2. the existing access arrangement and the relationship between the child and the access parent;
3. the desirability of maximizing contact between the child and both parents;
4. the views of the child;
5. the custodial parent’s reason for moving, only in the exceptional case where it is relevant to that parent’s ability to meet the needs of the child;
6. disruption to the child of a change in custody;
7. disruption to the child consequent on removal from family, schools, and the community he or she has come to know.
