= Reasons of the Supreme Court of Canada by Justice Major =

This is a list of all the opinions written by John C. Major during his tenure as puisne justice of the Supreme Court of Canada.

== 1992-1998 ==
- This part of the list is incomplete.
- R. v. S. (R.D.), [1997] 3 S.C.R. 484

== 1999 ==
- Ryan v. Victoria (City), [1999] 1 S.C.R. 201
- R. v. Ewanchuk, [1999] 1 S.C.R. 330
- Smith v. Jones, [1999] 1 S.C.R. 455
- CanadianOxy Chemicals Ltd. v. Canada (Attorney General), [1999] 1 S.C.R. 743
- Novak v. Bond, [1999] 1 S.C.R. 808
- M. v. H., [1999] 2 S.C.R. 3
- Dobson (Litigation Guardian of) v. Dobson, [1999] 2 S.C.R. 753
- Best v. Best, [1999] 2 S.C.R. 868
- Wells v. Newfoundland, [1999] 3 S.C.R. 199
- R. v. Liew, [1999] 3 S.C.R. 227
- Des Champs v. Conseil des écoles séparées catholiques de langue française de Prescott-Russell, [1999] 3 S.C.R. 281
- Abouchar v. Ottawa-Carleton French-language School Board – Public Sector, [1999] 3 S.C.R. 343

== 2000 ==
- Arsenault-Cameron v. Prince Edward Island, [2000] 1 S.C.R. 3; 2000 SCC 1
- R. v. Brooks, [2000] 1 S.C.R. 237; 2000 SCC 11
- Nanaimo (City) v. Rascal Trucking Ltd., [2000] 1 S.C.R. 342; 2000 SCC 13
- R. v. G.D.B., [2000] 1 S.C.R. 520; 2000 SCC 22
- Will-Kare Paving & Contracting Ltd. v. Canada, [2000] 1 S.C.R. 915; 2000 SCC 36
- R. v. D.D., [2000] 2 S.C.R. 275; 2000 SCC 43
- Public School Boards' Assn. of Alberta v. Alberta (Attorney General), [2000] 2 S.C.R. 409; 2000 SCC 45
- R. v. Avetysan, [2000] 2 S.C.R. 745; 2000 SCC 56
- Martel building Ltd. v. Canada, [2000] 2 S.C.R. 860; 2000 SCC 60

== 2001 ==
- R. v. Ferguson, [2001] 1 S.C.R. 281; 2001 SCC 6
- R. v. McClure, [2001] 1 S.C.R. 445; 2001 SCC 14
- Walker Estate v. York Finch General Hospital, [2001] 1 S.C.R. 647; 2001 SCC 23
- R. v. Rideout, [2001] 1 S.C.R. 755; 2001 SCC 27
- R. v. Pakoo, [2001] 1 S.C.R. 757; 2001 SCC 28
- Canada (Deputy Minister of National Revenue) v. Mattel Canada Inc., [2001] 2 S.C.R. 100; 2001 SCC 36
- Boston v. Boston, [2001] 2 S.C.R. 413; 2001 SCC 43
- 671122 Ontario Ltd. v. Sagaz Industries Canada Inc., [2001] 2 S.C.R. 983; 2001 SCC 59
- Singleton v. Canada, [2001] 2 S.C.R. 1046; 2001 SCC 61
- Derksen v. 539938 Ontario Ltd., [2001] 3 S.C.R. 398; 2001 SCC 72
- R. v. Jabarianha, [2001] 3 S.C.R. 430; 2001 SCC 75
- Cooper v. Hobart, [2001] 3 S.C.R. 537; 2001 SCC 79
- Edwards v. Law Society of Upper Canada, [2001] 3 S.C.R. 562; 2001 SCC 80
- R. v. Hynes, [2001] 3 S.C.R. 623; 2001 SCC 82
- Dunmore v. Ontario (Attorney General), [2001] 3 S.C.R. 1016; 2001 SCC 94

== 2002 ==
- Bank of Montreal v. Dynex Petroleum Ltd., [2002] 1 S.C.R. 146; 2002 SCC 7
- Oldfield v. Transamerica Life Insurance Co. of Canada, [2002] 1 S.C.R. 742; 2002 SCC 22
- R. v. Brown, [2002] 2 S.C.R. 185; 2002 SCC 32
- Housen v. Nikolaisen, [2002] 2 S.C.R. 235; 2002 SCC 33
- Gronnerud (Litigation Guardians of) v. Gronnerud Estate, [2002] 2 S.C.R. 417; 2002 SCC 38
- Bank of America Canada v. Mutual Trust Co., [2002] 2 S.C.R. 601; 2002 SCC 43
- R. v. Burke, [2002] 2 S.C.R. 857; 2002 SCC 55
- Krieger v. Law Society of Alberta, [2002] 3 S.C.R. 372; 2002 SCC 65
- R. v. Wilson, [2002] 3 S.C.R. 629; 2002 SCC 69
- R. v. Jarvis, [2002] 3 S.C.R. 757; 2002 SCC 73
- R. v. Ling, [2002] 3 S.C.R. 814; 2002 SCC 74
- 373409 Alberta Ltd. (Receiver of) v. Bank of Montreal, [2002] 4 S.C.R. 312; 2002 SCC 81

== 2003 ==
- Siemens v. Manitoba (Attorney General), [2003] 1 S.C.R. 6; 2003 SCC 3
- R. v. Harriott, [2003] 1 S.C.R. 39; 2003 SCC
- Markevich v. Canada, [2003] 1 S.C.R. 94; 2003 SCC 9
- Starson v. Swayze, [2003] 1 S.C.R. 722; 2003 SCC 32
- Ell v. Alberta, [2003] 1 S.C.R. 857; 2003 SCC 35
- Authorson v. Canada (Attorney General), [2003] 2 S.C.R. 40; 2003 SCC 39
- ParrySound (District) Social Services Administration Board v. O.P.S.E.U., Local 324, [2003] 2 S.C.R. 157; 2003 SCC 42
- Wewaykum Indian Band v. Canada, [2003] 2 S.C.R. 259; 2003 SCC 45
- British Columbia (Minister of Forests) v. Okanagan Indian Band, [2003] 3 S.C.R. 371; 2003 SCC 71
- Beals v. Saldanha, [2003] 3 S.C.R. 416; 2003 SCC 72

== 2004 ==
- Crystalline Investments Ltd. v. Domgroup Ltd., [2004] 1 S.C.R. 60; 2004 SCC 3
- R. v. Lyttle, [2004] 1 S.C.R. 193; 2004 SCC 5
- Gifford v. Canada, [2004] 1 S.C.R. 411; 2004 SCC 15
- Voice Construction Ltd. v. Construction & General Workers' Union, Local 92, [2004] 1 S.C.R. 609; 2004 SCC 23
- Pritchard v. Ontario (Human Right Commission), [2004] 1 S.C.R. 809; 2004 SCC 31
- Harper v. Canada (Attorney General), [2004] 1 S.C.R. 827; 2004 SCC 33
- Congrégation des témoins de Jéhovah de St-Jérôme-Lafontaine v. Lafontaine (Village), [2004] 2 S.C.R. 650; 2004 SCC 48
- Anderson v. Amoco Canada Oil and Gas, [2004] 3 S.C.R. 3; 2004 SCC 49
- Nova Scotia Power Inc. v. Canada, [2004] 3 S.C.R. 53; 2004 SCC 51
- R. v. Perrier, [2004] 3 S.C.R. 228; 2004 SCC 56
- R. v. Chan, [2004] 3 S.C.R. 245; 2004 SCC 57
- Peoples Department Stores Inc. (Trustee of) v. Wise, [2004] 3 S.C.R. 461; 2004 SCC 68
- R. v. Sazant, [2004] 3 S.C.R. 635; 2004 SCC 77

== 2005 ==
- R. v. Roberts [2005] 1 S.C.R. 22; 2005 SCC 3
- Rothmans, Benson & Hedges Inc. v. Saskatchewan [2005] 1 S.C.R. 188; 2005 SCC 13
- Gladstone v. Canada (Attorney General) [2005] 1 S.C.R. 325; 2005 SCC 21
- R. v. Paice [2005] 1 S.C.R. 339; 2005 SCC 22
- Chaoulli v. Quebec (Attorney General) [2005] 1 S.C.R. 791; 2005 SCC 35
- Mugesera v. Canada (Minister of Citizenship and Immigration), [2005] 2 S.C.R. 100; 2005 SCC 40
- Imperial Tobacco v. British Columbia, (2005)
- Canada Trustco Mortgage Co. v. Canada, [2005] 2 S.C.R. 601; 2005 SCC 54(With McLachlin)
- Mathew v. Canada, [2005] 2 S.C.R. 643; 2005 SCC 55 (With McLachlin)
- Zenner v. Prince Edward Island College of Optometrists, [2005] 3 S.C.R. 645; 2005 SCC 77
- Castillo v. Castillo, [2005] 3 S.C.R. 870; 2005 SCC 83
