= Canadian family law =

Family law in Canada concerns the body of Canadian law dealing with domestic partnerships, marriage, and divorce.

== Sources of family law ==
In Canada, family law is primarily statute-based. The federal government has exclusive jurisdiction over marriage and divorce under section 91(26) of the Constitution Act, 1867. The main piece of federal legislation governing the issues arising upon married spouses’ separation and the requirements for divorce is the Divorce Act. Pursuant to the Divorce Act, the federal government has jurisdiction over child custody and access matters and spousal and child support during or after divorce. The Divorce Act does not govern property issues. The provinces have exclusive jurisdiction over the solemnization of marriage under section 92(12) of the Constitution Act, 1867 and jurisdiction over spousal and child support, property division, custody and access, adoption, and child protection as part of the provincial government's jurisdiction over property and civil rights under section 92(13) of the Constitution Act, 1867 and jurisdiction over matters of a private nature under section 92(16) of the Act. Each province has an Act that addresses the rules of property division upon marriage breakdown.

== Marriage ==
Since 2005, a marriage may be formed between two individuals of different or same sex. Marriages are prohibited where an individual does not have the capacity or where there is a direct familial relationship such as parent/child or brother/sister. The minimum age to marry is 16 years. A valid marriage must be properly solemnized within the rules of the province.

== Annulments ==
A marriage may be nullified as void or voidable much in the same manner as a contract. A marriage is void when the parties do not have the capacity to marry (known as the essential validity of the marriage). Thus, marriages between blood relations, or parties already married, underage, or otherwise unable to consent would all be invalid for lack of essential validity. A marriage is voidable and can be annulled by a court if the spouses are incapable of consummating the marriage.

The formal prerequisites of a valid marriage are set out marriage laws of each Canadian province and territory. The parties must have a marriage license, be of proper age, or have parental consent. A marriage will generally be formally valid if it confirms to the laws of the province where the marriage is celebrated (lex loci celebrationis).

== Separation and contracts ==
The legal implications of a marital separation may be governed by a contract. A separation agreement is typically negotiated and drafted with or without the assistance of lawyers. It is best negotiated when both parties are represented by their own legal counsel. It can set out the parties' agreement with respect to the division of property as well as child support, spousal support, custody, and access. Full financial disclosure and supporting documentation such as appraisals and income tax information is strongly recommended before parties enter into an agreement regarding support and property matters. Many jurisdictions offer mediation services to help parties resolve or narrow their issues, either with or without lawyers. Parties can also enter into pre-nuptial contracts to regulate the economic consequences of a future marriage breakdown. If it is shown that one party had unfairly negotiated the agreement can be invalidated. It is important that full and accurate financial disclosure is produced prior to entering into a marriage or cohabitation agreement, or there is a risk that the agreement could later be set aside by a court. Custody, access and child support cannot be agreed upon in a marriage or cohabitation agreement.

== Divorce ==
Under the Divorce Act, a spouse may only apply for a divorce when the spouses have been separate and apart for at least one year, when there has been adultery or cruelty. Practically, almost all divorces are processed under an application based on being separate and apart for at least one year. It is possible for spouses to live separate and apart while sharing the same residence. A central registry of divorce proceedings has been kept in Canada since July 2, 1968. If there is another divorce application involving the same two spouses, the Registry lets the courts know. Courts must complete an application form and send it to the Registry for each divorce application received. The Registry was created and is governed by Regulations made under the Divorce Act.

== Division of property ==
Matrimonial property can be divided any time during or after the separation, divorce, or death. All matrimonial assets and property is presumed to be split evenly between spouses, after deducting debts. The scope of divisible matrimonial assets varies among provinces. Most provinces include all assets acquired during the marriage and any other assets pooled together. The most significant divisible assets include matrimonial home and pensions. Assets excluded typically include inheritances (unless the inheritance has been used to purchase the matrimonial home or has paid on the mortgage of the matrimonial home) and monetary damages for personal injuries. Business assets may also be excluded in some provinces. Business assets are typically limited to assets that produce an immediate gain in some entrepreneurial capacity. The value of a business owned by a spouse can be determined and included in the property to be divided.

== Custody and access ==
Custody and access are the terms used to describe the involvement of each parent in the lives of their children after separation. "Custody" is a term used to identify the decision making responsibility of each parent, with parents who have "sole custody" making significant decisions in their children's lives such as education, health, and religious upbringing. Parents who have "joint custody" make these decisions jointly. Joint custody can be difficult in situations where parties have poor communication following separation and/or where there has been violence in the relationship. "Access" describes the amount of time spent with children, including a regular parenting schedule and time spent over holidays, pursuant to a schedule set out in a separation agreement or imposed by a court if the parties have been unable to agree. In exceptional circumstances, grandparents or other relatives may be granted rights to exercise access. A new federal bill was introduced on May 22, 2018. Bill C-78 proposes to repeal the terms "custody" and "access" from the Divorce Act in favour of the terms such as "decision making responsibility" and "parenting time" which could be set out in a "parenting order" (if the matter is before the courts). In determining questions of custody / access and parenting arrangements, the main consideration is to look at what is in the best interests of the child or children. This is found in the legislation and as well the Supreme Court of Canada has referred to the best interests of the child as a child’s “positive right to the best possible arrangements in the circumstances.” There are numerous factors to be considered in examining what is in the best interest of the child or children. Bill C-78, which contains proposed amendments to the Divorce Act and other federal family law legislation, sets out a list of criteria to be considered in determining the best interest of the child or children. A few examples of these criteria include: the child’s needs, given the child’s age and stage of development, such as the child’s need for stability; the nature and strength of the child’s relationship with each spouse, each of the child’s siblings and grandparents and any other person who plays an important role in the child’s life and each spouse’s willingness to support the development and maintenance of the child’s relationship with the other spouse.

== Child support ==
Child support is determined by the federal or provincial Child Support Guidelines. The basic ("table") amount of support is determined by the payer's income and the number of children in need of support. In a situation where each parent has custody of one or more child, the amount of child support payable is the difference between the amount each parent would pay the other for the table amount. In split custody, where each spouse has custody of one or more children, the amount of a child support order is the difference between the amount that each spouse would otherwise pay if a child support order were sought against each of the spouses.

Special and extraordinary expenses that are specifically listed in §7 of the Child Support Guidelines, such as daycare, medical insurance coverage, health, education, and extracurricular expenses, may be ordered by the court to be shared by the parents. The expenses must be necessary with respect to the best interests of the child and must be reasonable having regard to the means and needs of the parents and children. Private schools and tutoring expenses and also extracurricular expenses are only allowable if they are "extraordinary".

== Spousal support ==
The entitlement and value of spousal support is determined on a holistic basis that varies greatly depending on the circumstances. There is no single basis of entitlement and there is no single philosophy behind the reasons for support.

The three grounds of entitlement are compensatory, non-compensatory (i.e. needs-based), and contractual. Moge v. Moge first addressed compensatory basis. The court found in most marriages one party tends to suffer economic disadvantage from the marriage. The disadvantaged party may be compensated to the point of returning both parties to the point they were before the marriage breakdown. Compensation is measured on the degree of contribution to the marriage, sacrifice, and hardship. The agreement between the two parties is contract-based support based upon their marriage or separation contract.

The non-compensatory basis focuses on the mutual obligation of support created by the marriage. Thus, in circumstances where one party is disabled the other party will be under an obligation to continue their support of the other as part of the initial obligation in marriage.

In 2008, the federal government released the final version of the Spousal Support Advisory Guidelines which were meant as a means of estimating support based on income. It has no binding effect in law, but rather is used as a tool for negotiations and settlement. The guidelines distinguish between spouses with children and without children.

The formula for spouses without children provides a range of between 1.5 and two percent of the difference in gross incomes for each year of cohabitation. The duration of the payment would be one half of a year to one year for every year of the marriage. If it is over 20 years this it is of indefinite duration.

Spouses with children would expect a range between 40 and 46 percent of the sum of each spouse's "net disposable income". Net disposable income for the payer is equal to the spouse's income subtracted by child support, taxes, and other deductions. Net disposable income for the payee is equal to the spouse's income minus child support, taxes, deductions plus government benefits and credits.

== See also ==
- Gordon v Goertz
