= Claire L'Heureux-Dubé =

Judge of the Supreme Court of Canada

The Honourable Claire L'Heureux-Dubé CC GOQ KC

Puisne Justice of the Supreme Court of Canada
- In office April 15, 1987 – July 1, 2002
- Nominated by: Brian Mulroney
- Appointed by: Jeanne Sauvé
- Preceded by: Julien Chouinard
- Succeeded by: Marie Deschamps

Personal details
- Born: September 7, 1927 (age 98) Quebec City, Quebec, Canada
- Education: Université Laval (LLB)

Claire L'Heureux-Dubé CC GOQ KC (born September 7, 1927) is a retired Canadian judge who served as a puisne justice on the Supreme Court of Canada from 1987 to 2002. She was the first woman from Quebec and the second woman appointed to this position, after Bertha Wilson. Previously, she had been one of the first female lawyers to handle divorce cases, and was the first woman appointed as a judge to the Quebec Superior Court and the Quebec Court of Appeal.

During L'Heureux-Dubé's time on the country's top court, she earned a reputation as a steadfast feminist and supporter of minority rights. Because roughly 40 percent of the 254 judgements that she wrote were dissents, she became known as the court's "great dissenter".

== Early life and career ==
L'Heureux-Dubé was born Claire L'Heureux in Quebec City in 1927. She was one of four girls raised by a mother who spent fifty years as a quadriplegic as a result of multiple sclerosis which developed when L'Heureux-Dubé was only nine. L'Heureux-Dubé attended the Ursuline Monastery of Quebec City and worked at a cod liver oil plant in Rimouski, Quebec, but quit when she was nineteen to continue her education.

In 1951, she graduated cum laude from the law faculty of Université Laval, despite facing gender discrimination such as not being given scholarships that were awarded to men of similar financial means. She then entered private practice in Quebec. From 1952 until 1973, she worked at L'Heureux, Philippon, Garneau, Tourigny, St-Arnaud & Associates, and was one of the first woman lawyers to work with divorce cases in the province.

In February 1973, L'Heureux-Dubé was appointed as a judge onto the Quebec Superior Court, becoming its first woman judge. From 1973 to 1976, she led a federal commission studying immigration problems in the province of Quebec. In October 1979, she was elevated to the Quebec Court of Appeal and was its first female judge. In 1981, she, along with future colleague Rosalie Abella, published Family Law: Dimensions of Justice, about Canadian family law. After eight years and writing 1,200 judgements for the Quebec Court of Appeal, L'Heureux-Dubé was elevated to the Supreme Court of Canada by Prime Minister Brian Mulroney in April 1987.

== Supreme Court ==
L'Heureux-Dubé's elevation to the Supreme Court in 1987 made her the second woman to sit on the country's highest court, after Bertha Wilson. According to L'Heureux-Dubé, a fellow judge on the Supreme Court refused to speak to her for the first three months after her appointment before passing her a note saying he considered her to have passed her probationary period.

L'Heureux-Dubé is typically remembered as one of the most prolific dissenters of the Court. Her judicial view was atypical for her time and often clashed with the majority of the Court. Her writing style and her tendency to use social science research in her reasons made for opinions that were often notable for their sheer length.

Among her more controversial decisions include her reasons in Moge v Moge, where she took a major departure from the practised standard of judicial notice by allowing for a broad range of social studies data to be given judicial notice as a legislative fact. Another dissent was in Canada (AG) v Mossop, where she alone acknowledged that the meaning of "family" is not fixed and should be read purposively to adapt to the changing times and it should include same-sex couples.

In the 1994 case Dagenais v Canadian Broadcasting Corp, L'Heureux-Dubé disagreed with the majority opinion written by Chief Justice Lamer that there was no hierarchy of rights in Canada because Charter rights – freedom of speech and the right to a fair trial in this case – had to be balanced against each other. L'Heureux-Dubé dissented, saying that in addition to CBC lacking a valid right to appeal to the Supreme Court, when freedom of expression and the right to a fair trial cannot be simultaneously fully respected, the latter should temporarily prevail.

In 1998, L'Heureux-Dubé was named president of the Geneva-based International Commission of Jurists.

In 1999, her concurring decision in R v Ewanchuk became the focus of a very public debate with Justice McClung of Alberta Court of Appeal. Justice McClung had written the decision of the Alberta Court of Appeal, upholding the acquittal of an accused person in a sexual assault case. The Supreme Court overturned the acquittal and entered a conviction. In her concurring opinion, written on behalf of herself and Justice Gonthier, Justice L'Heureux-Dubé described his ruling as showing outdated and stereotypical thinking about sexual assault. In response, Justice McClung wrote a letter to the National Post attacking L'Heureux-Dubé, describing her writing as overly personal and blaming her attitude for the rise in the suicide rate of Quebec men. The letter was controversial, and drew even more furor when it was pointed out that L'Heureux-Dubé's husband had committed suicide in 1978. A few months after the debate, L'Heureux-Dubé heard McClung had fallen ill, and wrote him a supportive letter, for which he thanked her and which she considered to be the end of the debate.

Later in 1999, L'Heureux-Dubé wrote the majority decision in Baker v Canada (Minister of Citizenship and Immigration), holding that international law, even when its provisions were unincorporated into Canadian law, could still be a source from which judges could find the values and principles behind Canadian legislation. L'Heureux-Dubé followed the decision in Baker with her majority decision in the 2001 case of Hudson v Spraytech & ChemLawn, holding that the precautionary principle should be seen as part of international customary law. She then ruled that the municipal government of Hudson, Quebec, was justified in banning Spraytech's pesticides and was not acting ultra vires the "general welfare" powers delegated to it by the Quebec provincial government.

At the time of her retirement on July 1, 2002, L'Heureux-Dubé was the most senior judge on the court in terms of time served. During her tenure on the court, she was regarded as perhaps its most controversial member, and as someone who usually only slept four hours a day so she could focus on her work. Critics labelled her a feminist, equal-rights ideologue because of her support for the battered woman defense, tax deductions for mothers in the workforce, expansive provisions for spousal support, and the protection of sexual-assault complainants' privacy. During her time on the court, she was a proponent of equality rights of women, immigrants, LGBT people, and other minority groups. L'Heureux-Dubé heard more than 1200 Supreme Court cases, wrote 254 judgments, dissenting from the majority in about 40 percent of them, which earned her the label of the "great dissenter".

== Post-Supreme Court activities ==
Shortly after L'Heureux-Dubé's July 2002 retirement from the Supreme Court at the age of 74, she took a Judge in Residence position with Université Laval University in Quebec City.

L'Heureux-Dubé also served as the president of La Maison de justice de Québec, a pilot project to improve access to justice in Quebec City which operated from 2004 until its 2006 closure after it failed to become financially self-sufficient. It sought to serve people who made too much to qualify for legal aid, but not enough to afford a lawyer by offering free services provided by mostly retired legal professionals. L'Heureux-Dubé had been chosen to run the pilot project's administrative aspects and recruitment effort because of her devotion to social justice and her legal connections.

In a 2013 report for the National Assembly of Quebec, L'Heureux-Dubé led a committee that recommended that Members of the National Assembly should give up benefits such as a golden parachute severance package in exchange for a pay raise from $88,000 to $136,000. The report proposed that this exchange of benefits for a payroll increase would be "cost neutral". L'Heureux-Dubé's report also proposed that transparency in expenditures be increased by forcing all members of the assembly to disclose their benefits, allowances, and indemnities to the public. As of December 2015, the pay raise was still not implemented, though the transition bonus given to MNAs who leave their office mid-term for any reason had been removed.

In February 2014, L'Heureux-Dubé spoke in support of the proposed Quebec Charter of Values during public hearings in the National Assembly. She argued that it did not infringe on human rights and was an opportunity to make Quebec a secular society. She also believed that it would withstand a constitutional challenge, saying that women's right to equality trumped the right to wear religious clothing, which was not the same right as freedom of religion. She had earlier indicated in a 2013 Radio Canada interview that fundamental rights such as the right to life and equality should not be abrogated by other civil liberties which could be "reduced" in a "free and democratic society". In response to email questions from The Globe and Mail, L'Heureux-Dubé also cited the thesis in Israeli judge and legal theorist Aharon Barak's book Proportionality that rights have to be given importance based on society's values.

== Personal life and honours ==
L'Heureux-Dubé married Arthur Dubé in 1957 and gave birth to a son and a daughter. Her husband died of suicide in 1978. Her son died in 1994; her daughter became a lawyer. L'Heureux-Dubé considered her judicial work as a refuge for the pain in her personal life by allowing her to compartmentalize her life.

L'Heureux-Dubé was appointed Queen's Counsel by the Province of Quebec in 1969. She was made a Companion of the Order of Canada in 2003. In 2004, she was made a Grand Officer of the National Order of Quebec, in recognition of her legal career and her contributions to equality for marginalized communities in both Quebec and Canada.

== See also ==
- Reasons of the Supreme Court of Canada by Justice L'Heureux-Dubé
- 1987 judgments of the Supreme Court of Canada
- 1988 judgments of the Supreme Court of Canada
- 1989 judgments of the Supreme Court of Canada

Legal offices
Preceded by Julien Chouinard	Puisne Justice of the Supreme Court of Canada; April 15, 1987 – July 1, 2002	Succeeded by Marie Deschamps
