= Philip Michael Epstein =

Canadian lawyer (born 1942)

Philip Michael Epstein CM OOnt QC LSM
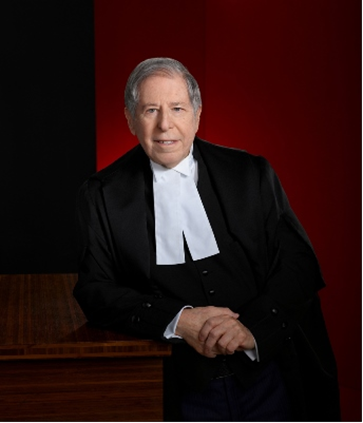
- Born: August 30, 1942; Hitchin, Hertfordshire, England
- Died: April 4, 2021
- Education: University of Toronto; University of Toronto Faculty of Law
- Occupations: lawyer, legal author
- Known for: Canadian family law
- Website: epsteincole.com/team/philip-m-epstein

Philip Michael Epstein CM OOnt QC is a Canadian family law lawyer.

Epstein was the co-founder and senior partner of Epstein Cole LLP, in Toronto, Ontario. He authored numerous publications, acted as a policy advisor to the Canadian government on family law issues, was a regular lecturer at law schools in Toronto, and practiced in mediation, arbitration, and appellate advocacy.

== Background ==
Epstein was born in Hitchin, Hertfordshire, England. He emigrated to Canada with his parents and went on to study at the University of Toronto. After obtaining his B.A. there in 1964, he obtained his law degree (LL.B.) from the University of Toronto Faculty of Law in 1968.

== Career ==
Epstein was called to the Ontario Bar in 1970. He founded Epstein Cole LLP with Kenneth Cole in 1978, and was a senior partner there. Epstein was the Head of the Family Law Section for the Bar Admission Course for the Law Society of Upper Canada (now the Law Society of Ontario) between 1983 and 1996, and is a former Chair of the Family Law Section of the Ontario Bar Association.

He has been described as “one of Canada’s leading lawyers and lecturers on family law” in Canadian Lawyer magazine and as the “Dean of the family law bar” by the Toronto Star newspaper.

From 1992 to 1997 Epstein was a member of the Child Support Advisory Committee, which advised the Canadian Department of Justice's child support team on the implementation of child support reforms. From 1997 – 2007 he was a member of the Department of Justice's Advisory Working Group On Family Law and Spousal Support Advisory Committee. These positions were by appointment of the federal government of Canada.

Epstein was a Bencher and Governing Member of the Law Society of Upper Canada between 1984 and 1999. During this time, he served as the chair for the Law Society's Admissions and Equity Committee, Legal Aid Clinic Funding Committee, and Education Committee. He co-founded the Dispute Resolution Officer Program for the Ontario Superior Court of Justice, and acted as a Dispute Resolution Officer of the Ontario Superior Court of Justice between 1995 and 2015.

Epstein represented clients in appellate matters and acted as a mediator and arbitrator. In addition to being a former Dispute Resolution Officer of the Superior Court of Ontario, Epstein was a Certified Mediator/Arbitrator of the ADR Institute of Ontario, and a Certified Mediator with the Ontario Association for Family Mediation.

Epstein was appointed Queen's Counsel in 1981.

== Awards ==
Epstein was a recipient of the 1998 Award of Excellence in Family Law from the Family Law Section of the Ontario Bar Association. He was awarded the Law Society of Upper Canada Medal in 1999 for his service to the profession. He was also a recipient of the 2012 Alternate Dispute Resolution Excellence Award from the Ontario Bar Association.

More recently, in 2018, Epstein was awarded the Order of Ontario. And in June 2020, The Law Society of Ontario awarded Epstein an honorary Doctors of Law.

In 2020, he was appointed as a member of the Order of Canada.

== Writing ==
Epstein was the Editor in Chief of the Reports of Family Law and the author of Epstein, This Week in Family Law. He authored of numerous articles on family law and solicitors' negligence claims for the Continuing Education Department of the Law Society of Upper Canada and for the Ontario Bar Association.

== Selected publications ==
- With A. Frank (eds.) Reports of Family Law, 7th Series/Recueil de jurisprudence en droit de la famille, 7e série, Thomson Reuters
- Epstein’s This Week in Family Law Newsletter, 2005 – ongoing, Thomson Reuters
- “Spousal Support– A Mediator's Perspective”, Ontario Bar Association, May 2013
- “Houston, we have a Problem”, Constructive Trust and Unjust Enrichment (A Discussion of Rawluk, Kerr, Vanasse and McNemee), Kissing Cousins: Joint Issues in Family Law and Trusts and Estates Law Conference, Ontario Bar Association Continuing Legal Education, Toronto, 1 May 2012
- With B. J. Fidler, “Parenting Coordination in Canada: An overview of legal and practice issues”, Journal of Child Custody, 5(1/2), 53–87, 2008
- “Wildman Implications are Growing”, 2007
- “A Kinder and Gentler Marriage Contract”, 2006
- With S. R. Gibb, “Family Law Arbitrations: Choice and Finality Under the Amended Arbitration Act, 1991 and Family Law Act”
- With L. Madsen, Joint custody with a vengeance: The emergence of parallel parenting orders
- With S. M. Grant, The Separation Agreement Annotated
- With R. D. Davis, “Surrogate motherhood: Legal, social and practical aspects from an Ontario viewpoint”
