= Ken Popert =

Ken Popert has been involved with Pink Triangle Press (PTP) since 1973 when he began contributing to The Body Politic. In 1986 he was appointed interim publisher of PTP, and he served as the executive director until April 3, 2017, when he was succeeded by David Walberg. An established queer liberation activist, Popert has been fighting for sexual liberation for almost 40 years. Popert lives in Toronto and is partnered with Brian Mossop, an activist in his own right for his 1993 case against the Government of Canada. In addition to his role at PTP, Popert serves as a board director of OUTtv and The ArQuives: Canada's LGBTQ2+ Archives.

== Activism ==
A member of the 1970s Gay Alliance Toward Equality, Popert was also an editor of The Body Politic. In late 1977, police raided TBP offices. Later, in January 1978, Popert was arrested alongside Gerald Hannon and Ed Jackson as a result of the published article "Men Loving Boys Loving Men". They were charged with using the mails for the purpose of transmitting indecent, immoral or scurrilous matter. Their acquittal was an important decision in Canadian history for freedom of (sexual) expression and freedom of the press.

In the hours following the 1981 Toronto bathhouse raids, Popert was part of a group of people who gathered at PTP's offices to organize a protest for February 6, 1981. That protest turned into a historic event that established the political power of Lesbian and Gay communities in Toronto. Later in the year on June 20, a demonstration and march was organized by the Right to Privacy Committee (RTPC) to further protest the Bathhouse Raids. After the demonstration the protesters, who numbered about 1,000, were attacked at Church and Charles streets by a group of anti-gay individuals. The event became known as "The Battle of Church Street." Police eventually showed up and Popert was struck by a police car and many others were injured, including Rev. Brent Hawkes who was punched by a police officer. Both Popert and Hawkes were unsuccessful in pressing charges against the police.

After The Body Politic folded in 1987, Popert reshaped the not-for-profit PTP, helping prevent its bankruptcy and building Xtra! into a viable business. From there, he led PTP to become Canada's largest gay media group.
