= Schools Consent Project =

UK sex-education workshop provider

The Schools Consent Project is a charity organisation based in the UK which delivers sexual education workshops focusing on the topic of consent. It was founded in 2014, delivering its first workshop in March 2015. Pupils aged 11–18 are taken through topics such as harassment, revenge porn and sexting. The organisation makes use of pro-bono and voluntary contributions of expertise from lawyers and law students.
