= R v JA =

2011 Supreme Court of Canada case

- Supreme Court of Canada

Hearing: November 8, 2010 Judgment: May 27, 2011
- Full case name: Her Majesty The Queen v JA
- Citations: 2011 SCC 28
- Docket No.: 33684
- Prior history: Judgment for the defendant in the Court of Appeal for Ontario
- Ruling: Appeal allowed and conviction entered

Holding
- A person can only legally consent to sexual activity if they have an operating mind during the sexual activity in question. Therefore, performing sexual activity on an unconscious person is a criminal offence – whether or not the unconscious person consented in advance.

Court membership
- Chief Justice: Beverley McLachlin; Puisne Justices: Ian Binnie, Louis LeBel, Marie Deschamps, Morris Fish, Rosalie Abella, Louise Charron, Marshall Rothstein, Thomas Cromwell

Reasons given
- Majority: McLachlin (paras. 1–67), joined by Deschamps, Abella, Charron, Rothstein, and Cromwell
- Dissent: Fish (paras. 68–145), joined by Binnie and LeBel

R v JA [2011] 2 S.C.R. 440, 2011 SCC 28 is a criminal law decision of the Supreme Court of Canada regarding consent in cases of sexual assaults. The court found that a person can only consent to sexual activity if they are conscious throughout that activity. If a person becomes unconscious during the sexual activity, then they legally cannot consent, whether or not they consented earlier. In addition to the two parties (J.A. and the Attorney General of Ontario), the Court heard from two interveners: the Attorney General of Canada and the Women's Legal Education and Action Fund (LEAF).

== Background ==
=== Alleged offence ===
On May 27, 2007, J.A. and his long-term partner, K.D., began having consensual sexual activity together. During the sexual activity, K.D. consented for J.A. to choke her as part of the sexual activity. K.D. lost consciousness for about three minutes, and she understood this might happen when she consented to being choked.

While K.D. was unconscious, J.A. tied K.D. up and performed additional sexual acts on her. In her testimony, K.D. was not clear whether she knew or consented to that sexual activity J.A. performed on her while she was unconscious. After K.D. regained consciousness, she and J.A. continued having consensual sexual activity.

On July 11, 2007, K.D. made a complaint to the police, saying that the activity was not consensual, although she later recanted her statement. J.A. was charged with aggravated assault, sexual assault, attempting to render a person unconscious in order to sexually assault them, and breaching a probation order.

=== Trial ===
At trial, the trial judge found that K.D. had consented to being choked into unconsciousness. Although the court found that this was bodily harm, the trial judge found that it was too transient to amount to bodily harm. As a result, the judge acquitted J.A. of aggravated assault and choking K.D. However, the trial judge found either K.D. did not consent to the sexual activity, or if she did, then she could not legally consent to sexual activity taking place while she was unconscious. J.A. was found guilty of sexual assault and breaching his probation order.

=== Appeal ===
On appeal, the Court of Appeal for Ontario was unanimous that there was insufficient evidence to conclude that K.D. did not consent to the sexual activity.

In addition, the majority found that persons can consent to sexual activity to take place after they are rendered unconscious. The majority also concluded that while the trial judge erred and that there was, in fact, bodily harm, they ruled that bodily harm cannot vitiate consent on a charge of only sexual assault.

The dissenting judge found that consent for the purpose of sexual assault required an active mind during the sexual activity in question.

== Reasons of the court ==
The Supreme Court of Canada only ruled on the issue of whether consent for the purpose of sexual assault requires an active mind during the sexual activity in question.

=== Majority ===
The majority judgment was given by Chief Justice Beverley McLachlin.

The majority reviewed the definition of consent for sexual assaults found in section 273.1 of the Criminal Code, and concluded that: "Parliament viewed consent as the conscious agreement of the complainant to engage in every sexual act in a particular encounter." Ultimately, the majority concluded that Parliament intended for a person to have an active mind during the sexual activity in question.

In coming to their conclusion, the majority noted the following:

1. Consent in advance is not a defence, as a person must be able to withdraw their consent during the sexual activity in question.
2. The rule only applies to consent in cases of sexual assault.
3. Although this may lead to an odd interpretation, such as one partner kissing the other partner while they are asleep, the majority found that this was Parliament's intention, and it cannot be overruled without a constitutional challenge. (See Canadian Charter of Rights and Freedoms#Interpretation and enforcement.)

As a result, J.A. was guilty of sexual assault.

=== Dissent ===
The dissenting judgment was given by Justice Morris Fish.

The dissent found a number of problems with the majority's interpretation:

1. It would deprive women of their freedom to engage in sexual activity that does not result in bodily harm.
2. It would mean that cohabiting partners, including spouses, risk having one partner commit a sexual assault when that partner kisses or caresses their sleeping partner, even with that sleeping partner's prior express consent.

The dissent found that absent a clear prohibition in the Criminal Code, a conscious person can consent in advance to sexual activity to take place while they are unconscious, provided there is no bodily harm, and provided the sexual activity did not go beyond what was agreed to.

== Critical review ==
The case drew much attention from the media and legal analysts.

Elizabeth Sheehy, a law professor at the University of Ottawa who represented LEAF at the Supreme Court, said that the decision protects women who are vulnerable to sexual exploitation because they are asleep, medicated, have episodic disabilities, or are drunk. Sheehy noted that the decision upheld that "unconscious women are not sexually available". Melanie Randall, who drafted some of the legal arguments for LEAF, said that the decision does not change the law and merely reaffirms the law that has been in place since 1983.

Martha Shaffer, a law professor at the University of Toronto, said that the Criminal Code was explicit that a person could not consent if they were unconscious, but it was not expressly clear whether prior consent could be given. "Now the law is clear: The notion that you give prior consent is not recognized in Canadian law", Shaffer said.

Rosie DiManno, a columnist with the Toronto Star, criticized the decision, saying that it "infantilizes" women.

== See also ==
- List of Supreme Court of Canada cases (McLachlin Court)
- List of Supreme Court of Canada cases
- R v Ewanchuk
- R v Jobidon
