= Canada (AG) v Mossop =

- Supreme Court of Canada

Hearing: June 3, 1992 Judgment: February 25, 1993
- Full case name: Canadian Human Rights Commission v. Department of Secretary of State, Treasury Board of Canada and Canadian Union of Professional and Technical Employees and Attorney General of Canada and Brian Mossop
- Citations: [1993] 1 SCR 554, 100 DLR (4th) 658
- Docket No.: 22145
- Prior history: Judgment for the Canadian Human Rights Commission in Federal Court of Appeal.
- Ruling: Appeal dismissed

Holding
- 1. The Federal Court of Appeal had the necessary jurisdiction to overturn the Canadian Human Rights Tribunal as there was no privative clause.; 2. There was no discrimination because sexual orientation was not a prohibited ground of discrimination under the Canadian Human Rights Act. Absent a Charter challenge, the Act could not be interpreted to include sexual orientation.

Court membership
- Chief Justice: Antonio Lamer; Puisne Justices: Gérard La Forest, Claire L'Heureux-Dubé, John Sopinka, Charles Gonthier, Peter Cory, Beverley McLachlin, William Stevenson, Frank Iacobucci

Reasons given
- Majority: Lamer C.J., joined by Sopinka and Iacobucci JJ.
- Concurrence: La Forest J., joined by Iacobucci J.
- Concur/dissent: Cory J.
- Concur/dissent: McLachlin J.
- Dissent: L'Heureux-Dube J.
- Gonthier and Stevenson JJ. took no part in the consideration or decision of the case.

Laws applied
- Canadian Human Rights Act, RSC, 1985, c H‑6, ss. 3, 10; Federal Court Act, RSC, 1985, c F‑7, s. 28

Canada (AG) v Mossop, [1993] 1 SCR 554 was the first decision of the Supreme Court of Canada to consider equality rights for gays. The case is also significant as one of Justice L'Heureux-Dube's most famous dissents where she proposes an evolving model of the "family".

== Background ==
In 1985, Brian Mossop, a gay man from Toronto, sought bereavement leave from his employer, the Canadian federal government's Translation Bureau, to attend the funeral of his same-sex partner's father. His partner is journalist and activist Ken Popert. His employer denied him leave under the collective agreement on the grounds that Popert was not "immediate family". Mossop took his employer before the Canadian Human Rights Commission. Sexual orientation was not a prohibited ground of discrimination at that time, so he argued that he had been discriminated against on the basis of his "family status", under section 3 of the Canadian Human Rights Act.

The Canadian Human Rights Tribunal found in his favour, but the government appealed to the Federal Court of Appeal and the favourable finding was overturned. Mossop appealed to the Supreme Court, but it upheld the finding of the Federal Court.

== Reasons of the court ==
The majority held that absent a Charter challenge of the constitutional validity of the Canadian Human Rights Act, there was no grounds for a claim.

The only issues raised in the appeal was a question of law on whether the Federal Court of Appeal had jurisdiction to overturn the Tribunal under s. 28 of the Federal Court Act and of statutory interpretation of the Canadian Human Rights Act.

It was held that the Federal Court of Appeal did have the necessary jurisdiction to review the Tribunal's decision, as there was no privative clause governing the Tribunal. Since the question posed to the Tribunal was one of statutory interpretation, a question of law, judicial deference was not warranted.

On the question of whether there was discrimination on the basis of "family status", the court found that there was no grounds for Mossop's claim because Parliament intentionally excluded sexual orientation from the list of prohibited grounds of discrimination. Since the intent was clear, both the Federal Court and Tribunal were bound to apply the law.

== Dissent ==
In dissent, Madam Justice L'Heureux-Dube found that there was basis to read sexual orientation into the term "family status" within the Canadian Human Rights Act. She argued that the meaning of family should be read purposively and that given the growing number of non-traditional families there is a need to reconsider its meaning in light of these changes. She was joined on this point by McLachlin J. and Cory J., who both agreed that the relationship of Mossop and his partner fell within the scope of the term "family status".

== Aftermath ==
Despite the dismissal of his appeal Mossop declared the decision a success as it opened up a national debate on gay rights. A subsequent Supreme Court case to consider discrimination against gay persons, Egan v. Canada, would find that sexual orientation is a prohibited grounds of discrimination under Section 15 of the Canadian Charter of Rights and Freedoms.

== See also ==
- List of Supreme Court of Canada cases (Lamer Court)
