= Reasons of the Supreme Court of Canada by Justice Rowe =

The following is a list of Supreme Court of Canada opinions written by Malcolm Rowe during his tenure on the Court.

== 2017 ==
Malcolm Rowe 2017 statistics

4	Majority or Plurality	3	Concurrence	0	Other
3	Dissent	0	Concurrence/dissent	Total =	10
Written opinions = 10		Oral opinions = 0		Unanimous decisions = 2

Case name	Issue	Co-authored by	Joined by
Google Inc v Equustek Solutions Inc; 2017 SCC 34	Injunctions barring use and sale of intellectual property	Côté J	–
AstraZeneca Canada Inc v Apotex Inc; 2017 SCC 36	Intellectual property and patent rights	–	Unanimous
R v Alex; 2017 SCC 37	Admissibility of breath sample evidence	–	McLachlin CJ and Abella and Brown JJ
Quebec (AG) v Guérin; 2017 SCC 42	Standard of review of arbitration decisions	Brown J	–
Canada (AG) v Fontaine; 2017 SCC 47	Civil procedure – Settlement of class proceedings	Brown J	Unanimous
Teva Canada Ltd v TD Canada Trust; 2017 SCC 51	Commercial law – Bills of exchange	Côté J	McLachlin CJ and Wagner
Ktunaxa Nation v British Columbia (Forests, Lands and Natural Resource Operations); 2017 SCC 54	Freedom of religion	McLachlin CJ	Abella, Karakatsanis, Wagner, Gascon and Brown JJ
R v Marakah; 2017 SCC 59	Constitutional law – Admissibility of evidence derived from unreasonable search and seizure	–	–
R v Jones; 2017 SCC 60	Constitutional law – Admissibility of evidence derived from unreasonable search and seizure	–	–
British Columbia (Human Rights Tribunal) v Schrenk; 2017 SCC 61	Discrimination on basis of employment	–	Moldaver, Karakatsanis, Wagner and Gascon JJ
