= Reasons of the Supreme Court of Canada by Justice Martin =

The following is a list of Supreme Court of Canada opinions written by Sheilah Martin during her tenure on the Court.

== 2018 ==
Sheilah Martin 2018 statistics

Majority or Plurality	Concurrence		Other
Dissent	Concurrence/dissent	Total =
Written opinions =	Oral opinions =	Unanimous decisions =

Case name	Issue	Co-authored by	Joined by

== 2021 ==
- R. v. Khill, 2021 SCC 37 (CanLII) - majority
- R. v. Chouhan, 2021 SCC 26 (CanLII), [2021] 2 SCR 136 - concurrence
- Colucci v. Colucci, 2021 SCC 24 (CanLII), [2021] 2 SCR 3
- Reference re Code of Civil Procedure (Que.), art. 35, 2021 SCC 27
- Nelson (City) v Marchi, 2021 SCC 41
- Canada v. Alta Energy Luxembourg S.A.R.L., 2021 SCC 49

== 2022 ==
- B.J.T. v. J.D., 2022 SCC 24 (CanLII)
- R. v. Ndhlovu, 2022 SCC 38 - majority
- R. v. Beaver, 2022 SCC 54 (CanLII) - dissent
- R v. Tessier, 2022 SCC 35 - dissent
- R v. Kirkpatrick, 2022 SCC 33 - majority

== 2023 ==
- R. v. Greater Sudbury (City), 2023 SCC 28 (CanLII) - majority
- R. v. Hills, 2023 SCC 2 (CanLII)
- R. v. Haevischer, 2023 SCC 11 (CanLII)
- R. v. Bertrand Marchand, 2023 SCC 26 (CanLII) - majority
- R. v. Hilbach, 2023 SCC 3 (CanLII), - majority
- R. v. Kirkpatrick, 2022 SCC 33 (CanLII)
- R. v. Zacharias, 2023 SCC 30 (CanLII)

== 2024 ==
- R. v. Kruk, 2024 SCC 7 (CanLII) - majority
- Dickson v. Vuntut Gwitchin First Nation, 2024 SCC 10 (CanLII) - dissent with O'Bonsawin J
