= Reasons of the Supreme Court of Canada by Justice Charron =

This is a list of all the reasons written by Louise Charron during her tenure as puisne justice of the Supreme Court of Canada.

== 2005 ==
Louise Charron 2005 statistics

11	Majority or Plurality	0	Concurrence	1	Other
3	Dissent	0	Concurrence/dissent	Total =	15
Written opinions = 0		Oral opinions = 0
Unanimous decisions: 0		Most joined by:		Least joined by:

	Case name	Issue	Joined by
	R. v. Krymowski [2005] 1 S.C.R. 101; 2005 SCC 7	Hate speech towards Gypsies	unanimous
	Tsiaprailis v. Canada [2005] 1 S.C.R. 113; 2005 SCC 8	Income tax; disability	Bastarache, Binnie and Deschamps JJ.
oral	R. v. P.E.C. [2005] 1 S.C.R. 290; 2005 SCC 19	Evidence	unanimous
	R. v. Paice [2005] 1 S.C.R. 339; 2005 SCC 22	Defence of consent; R. v. Jobidon	Major, Binnie, LeBel, Deschamps and Abella JJ.
	H.L. v. Canada (Attorney General) [2005] 1 S.C.R. 401; 2005 SCC 25	Standard of appellate review	None
	R. v. Gunning [2005] 1 S.C.R. 627; 2005 SCC 27	jury direction	unanimous
	R. v. Orbanski; R. v. Elias [2005] 2 S.C.R. 3; 2005 SCC 37	Right to counsel, road-side sobriety tests	McLachlin C.J. and Major, Bastarache, Binnie, Deschamps and Abella JJ.
	Mugesera v. Canada (Minister of Citizenship and Immigration) [2005] 2 S.C.R. 100; 2005 SCC 40	Judicial review; crimes outside of country; crimes against humanity	Unanimous
	R. v. Hamilton [2005] 2 S.C.R. 432; 2005 SCC 47	Mens rea for criminal counselling; e-mail fraud	Major and Abella JJ.
	R. v. Pires; R. v. Lising [2005] 3 S.C.R. 343; 2005 SCC 66	Cross-examination; interception of private communications; charter rights	Unanimous
	R. v. Boucher [2005] 3 S.C.R. 499; 2005 SCC 72	Breathalizer evidence	Binnie, LeBel and Fish JJ.
	Charlebois v. Saint John (City) [2005] 3 S.C.R. 563; 2005 SCC 74	Language rights	McLachlin C.J. and Major, Fish and Abella JJ.
	R. v. MacKay [2005] 3 S.C.R. 725; 2005 SCC 79	Aggravated assault	Unanimous
	May v. Ferndale Institution [2005] 3 S.C.R. 809; 2005 SCC 82	Habeas Corpus; transfer of prison inmates	Major and Bastarache JJ.
	R. v. Wiles [2005] 3 S.C.R. 895; 2005 SCC 84	Cruel and Unusual punishment; charter rights; firearm prohibition for cannabis conviction	Unanimous

== 2006 ==
Louise Charron 2006 statistics

7	Majority or Plurality	0	Concurrence	0	Other
0	Dissent	0	Concurrence/dissent	Total =	7
Written reasons = ?		Oral reasons = ?
Unanimous decisions: ?		Most joined by:		Least joined by:

Case name	Issue	Co-authored by	Joined by
Multani v. Commission scolaire Marguerite‑Bourgeoys; 2006 SCC 6	Section 2(a) of the Charter; freedom of religion	None	McLachlin, Bastarache, Binnie and Fish
R. v. Pittiman; 1 S.C.R. _; 2006 SCC 9	reasonabless of jury conviction	None	Unanimous
R. v. Rodgers [2006] 1 S.C.R. 554, 2006 SCC 15	Charter rights; Use of DNA evidence	None	McLachlin C.J. and Bastarache and Abella JJ.
R. v. B.W.P.; R. v. B.V.N. 2006 SCC 27	Sentencing young offenders	None	Unanimous
R. v. Shoker; 2006 SCC 44	Probation	None	McLachlin C.J. and Binnie, Fish and Abella JJ.
R. v. Angelillo; 2006 SCC 55	Sentencing with past convictions	None	McLachlin C.J. and Bastarache, LeBel and Deschamps JJ.
R. v. Khelawon; 2006 SCC 57	Hearsay exception	None	Unanimous

== 2010 ==
Statistics

XXXXX	Majority or Plurality	XXX	Concurrence	XXXX	Other
XXXX	Dissent	XXXX	Concurrence/dissent	Total =	XXXXXX
Written opinions = XXX		Oral opinions = XXX		Unanimous decisions = XXX

Case name	Issue	Co-authored by	Joined by
XXX; CITATIONS [URL]	XXX	XXX	XXX
XXX; CITATIONS [URL]	XXX	XXX	XXX

== 2011 ==
Statistics

XXXXX	Majority or Plurality	XXX	Concurrence	XXXX	Other
XXXX	Dissent	XXXX	Concurrence/dissent	Total =	XXXXXX
Written opinions = XXX		Oral opinions = XXX		Unanimous decisions = XXX

Case name	Issue	Co-authored by	Joined by
R v White; 2011 SCC 13	Whether the trial judge's failure to state to the jury that post-offence conduct has no probative value constituted an error of law	XXX	Deschamps J
R v JAA; 2011 SCC 17	Admission of fresh evidence	–	McLachlin CJ and Binnie, Fish and Cromwell JJ
Canada (Information Commissioner) v Canada (Minister of National Defence); 2011 SCC 25	Access to information	–	McLachlin CJ and Binnie, Deschamps, Fish, Abella, Rothstein and Cromwell JJ
R v Katigbak; 2011 SCC 48	Possession of child pornography and statutory defences	McLachlin CJ	Binnie, Deschamps, Abella, Rothstein and Cromwell JJ
