= R v Ewanchuk =

- Supreme Court of Canada

Hearing: October 14, 1998 Judgment: February 25, 1999
- Full case name: Her Majesty The Queen v Steve Brian Ewanchuk
- Citations: [1999] 1 SCR 330
- Docket No.: 26493
- Prior history: Judgment for Ewanchuk in the Alberta Court of Appeal

Court membership
- Chief Justice: Antonio Lamer; Puisne Justices: Claire L'Heureux-Dubé, Charles Gonthier, Peter Cory, Beverley McLachlin, Frank Iacobucci, John C. Major, Michel Bastarache, Ian Binnie

Reasons given
- Majority: Major (paras 1–67), joined by Lamer, Cory, Iacobucci, Bastarache and Binnie
- Concurrence: L'Heureux-Dubé (paras 68–102), joined by Gonthier
- Concurrence: McLachlin (paras 103–104)

R v Ewanchuk, [1999] 1 SCR 330 is a leading Supreme Court of Canada case concerning the defence of consent to a charge of sexual assault. The Court held that there was no defence of implied consent. The case is also notable for the controversy that arose between Justice John McClung of the Alberta Court of Appeal and Justice Claire L'Heureux-Dubé of the Supreme Court.

== Background ==
Steve Ewanchuk brought a 17-year-old girl into his van for a job interview. After the interview, Ewanchuk invited the girl to his trailer in behind. He took her into his trailer and began to make a series of advances. Each time she would say "no" to his advance and he would stop but, after the passing of some time would then renew his sexual advances. At one point, at his request, she massaged his shoulders. She testified at trial that during her time in the trailer she was very afraid and that is why she did not take further action to stop the sexual conduct such as leaving or attempting to physically resist the man. Before she left, Ewanchuk paid her $100.00, telling her it was payment for the massage. He instructed her not to tell anyone what had happened.

At trial, Ewanchuk successfully argued that, although the girl had initially said "no" to his sexual touching, because he had continued and she had failed to object further, this constituted "implied consent". The acquittal was upheld on appeal. In the decision of the Alberta Court of Appeal, Justice John McClung commented that "it must be pointed out that the complainant did not present herself to Ewanchuk or enter his trailer in a bonnet and crinolines" and that Ewanchuk's conduct was "less criminal than hormonal".

The issue before the Supreme Court was "whether the trial judge erred in his understanding of consent in sexual assault and whether his conclusion that the defence of 'implied consent' exists in Canadian law was correct".

== Reasons of the court ==
Justice Major, for the majority, held there was no defence of "implied consent" to sexual assault and overturned the ruling of the Court of Appeal.

The accused, Major explained, must raise a reasonable doubt that there was consent. Consent can be shown in one of two ways. Either where the "complainant in her mind wanted the sexual touching to take place" or, in the case of establishing a mistaken belief of consent, where "the complainant had affirmatively communicated by words or conduct her agreement to engage in sexual activity with the accused".

L'Heureux-Dubé held that the defence could not be used unless the accused took sufficient steps to ascertain consent. Here, the accused did not make any attempt to ensure that the accused had consent when he moved from a massage to sexual touching.

She also castigated McClung J's opinion severely, arguing that it reposed on myths and stereotypes about women and sexual assault.

== Aftermath ==
In response to L'Heureux-Dubé's criticism, McClung wrote a letter to the National Post criticizing her and claiming she let her personal beliefs get in the way of her judgment. He also made the comment that her judgments contributed to a rise in male suicides in Quebec. He soon published an apology for the comment, saying he was unaware that L'Heureux-Dubé's husband had committed suicide.

== See also ==
- List of Supreme Court of Canada cases (Lamer Court)
- R v JA
