= Moge v Moge =

- Supreme Court of Canada

Hearing: April 1, 1992 Judgment: December 17, 1992
- Citations: [1992] 3 S.C.R. 813
- Docket No.: 21979

Court membership
- Chief Justice: Antonio Lamer; Puisne Justices: Gérard La Forest, Claire L'Heureux-Dubé, John Sopinka, Charles Gonthier, Peter Cory, Beverley McLachlin, William Stevenson, Frank Iacobucci

Reasons given
- Majority: L'Heureux‑Dubé J., joined by La Forest, Gonthier, Cory and Iacobucci JJ.
- Concurrence: McLachlin J., joined by Gonthier J.
- Lamer C.J. took no part in the consideration or decision of the case.

Moge v Moge, [1992] 3 S.C.R. 813 is a leading Supreme Court of Canada decision where the Court greatly restricted a court's ability to terminate alimony payments. The decision is viewed by some groups as a landmark for women's rights as it is said to protect women with little job experience from becoming destitute when they get a divorce.

== Background ==
A Polish couple, Andrzej and Zofia Moge, were separated in 1973 and eventually divorced. Zofia had been a house-wife for the duration of the marriage and experienced many difficulties in finding work once separated. She worked at a hotel as a maid but eventually lost her job. Andrzej paid child and spousal support at the time, but once Zofia lost her job, she applied to have an increase in spousal support. When Zofia found another job, Andrzej submitted an application to have the support cut-off.

The issue before the Supreme Court was whether the court could grant a cancellation of support on the grounds that she had not been able to reach a level of self-sufficiency.

== Ruling ==
Justice L'Heureux-Dubé, writing for the majority, held that the grounds for cancellation was insufficient. Though the Divorce Act has "self-sufficiency" as one of its objectives it does not subject the spouse to a "sink or swim" philosophy. L'Heureux-Dubé instead proposed that cases be considered on the merits of the recipient's economic status that are a result of the marriage breakdown.
