= John C. Major =

Canadian jurist (born 1931)

Puisne Justice of the Supreme Court of Canada
- In office November 13, 1992 – December 25, 2005
- Nominated by: Brian Mulroney
- Preceded by: William Stevenson
- Succeeded by: Marshall Rothstein

Personal details
- Born: February 20, 1931 (age 95) Mattawa, Ontario, Canada

John Charles Major CC KC (born February 20, 1931) is a Canadian jurist and was a puisne justice on the Supreme Court of Canada from 1992 to 2005.

== Early life and education ==
Major was born at Mattawa Hospital in Mattawa, Ontario. Major received a Bachelor of Commerce degree from Loyola College in 1953 and a Bachelor of Laws degree from the University of Toronto Faculty of Law in 1957.

== Career ==
Major practised law as a partner in the Calgary office of Bennett Jones LLP for 34 years. He was appointed a Queen's Counsel in 1972. From 1975 to 1985, he was the Senior Counsel for the Calgary Police Service. He was appointed to the Court of Appeal of Alberta on July 11, 1991.

== Supreme Court ==
On November 13, 1992, he was appointed to the Supreme Court of Canada by Prime Minister Brian Mulroney. He was known for his belief in providing deference to government and for his particularly succinct writing style. Major stepped down from the court on December 25, 2005, approximately two months before the mandatory retirement date of his 75th birthday.

== Administrator of Canada ==
On September 27, 2005, Major served as Administrator of Canada, due to the absence of Chief Justice Beverley McLachlin, during the transition between Governors General Adrienne Clarkson and Michaëlle Jean.

== Post-court ==
On January 5, 2006, he rejoined the Calgary office of Bennett Jones LLP, the firm with which he practised before his judicial career. On March 8, 2006, he was appointed by Prime Minister Stephen Harper to lead a public inquiry into the Air India Flight 182 bombing and the resulting trials. He was made a Companion of the Order of Canada in the Canada Day 2008 Honours.

== See also ==
- Reasons of the Supreme Court of Canada by Justice Major
