= R v Powley =

Supreme Court of Canada case defining Métis Aboriginal rights

R. v. Powley
- Supreme Court of Canada

Hearing: March 17, 2003 Judgment: September 19, 2003
- Full case name: Her Majesty The Queen (Appellant/respondent on cross‑appeal) v. Steve Powley and Roddy Charles Powley (Respondents/appellants on cross‑appeal) and Attorney General of Canada, Attorney General of Quebec, Attorney General of New Brunswick, Attorney General of Manitoba, Attorney General of British Columbia, Attorney General for Saskatchewan, Attorney General of Alberta, Attorney General of Newfoundland and Labrador, Labrador Métis Nation, a body corporate, Congress of Aboriginal Peoples, Métis National Council ("MNC"), Métis Nation of Ontario ("MNO"), B.C. Fisheries Survival Coalition, Aboriginal Legal Services of Toronto Inc. ("ALST"), Ontario Métis and Aboriginal Association ("OMAA"), Ontario Federation of Anglers and Hunters ("OFAH"), Métis Chief Roy E. J. DeLaRonde, on behalf of the Red Sky Métis Independent Nation, and North Slave Métis Alliance
- Citations: 2003 SCC 43, [2003] 2 SCR 207
- Docket No.: 28533

Court membership
- Chief Justice: Beverley McLachlin; Puisne Justices: Charles Gonthier, Frank Iacobucci, John C. Major, Michel Bastarache, Ian Binnie, Louise Arbour, Louis LeBel, Marie Deschamps

Reasons given
- Unanimous reasons by: The Court

Laws applied
- Constitution Act, 1982, s. 35

R. v. Powley, 2003 SCC 43, [2003] 2 SCR 207, commonly called the Powley ruling, is a Supreme Court of Canada case defining Métis Aboriginal rights under section 35(1) of the Constitution Act, 1982. It was the first case of the Métis Trifecta, a series of foundational court cases which established Métis Aboriginal rights in Canada. When it was delivered, the case was "the only final appellate court decision in any common law jurisdiction addressing constitutionally entrenched Métis Aboriginal rights".

== Background ==
Section 35 of the Constitution Act, 1982 established constitutional protection for indigenous and treaty rights of the aboriginal peoples of Canada. The legislation was hailed by lawmakers as a "'turning point for the status of native peoples" in Canada. Nonetheless, the Canadian government at the time concluded that the Métis lacked "existing Aboriginal rights protected by s. 35"; therefore, it did not recognize Métis claims to these rights at the time the case arose.

Around 9 a.m. on October 22, 1993, a Sault Ste. Marie father and son, Steve and Roddy Powley, shot and killed a bull moose north of the city. Though the pair did not possess the proper documentation to hunt the animal absent protected rights, "validation tag requirement[s] and seasonal restrictions" would otherwise not have been "enforced against Status Indians". The catch had been tagged with a Métis identification card, the details of the kill, and a note reading "harvesting my meat for winter". One week later, they were charged by Ontario Conservation Officers with possession of a moose shot out of season and without a licence, in violation of Ontario's Game and Fish Act. The pair pleaded not guilty on the grounds that as Métis, they had an Aboriginal right to hunt that was not subject to Ontario game laws.

== Procedural history ==
The Ontario Court of Justice agreed with the defendants and dismissed the charges. The Ontario Attorney General appealed that decision to the Ontario Superior Court of Justice, which upheld the acquittals and denied the appeal.

The Ontario Attorney General appealed again, to the Ontario Court of Appeal, which also upheld the acquittals and denied the appeal. Finally, Ontario appealed the decision to the Supreme Court of Canada, where a unanimous court upheld the decisions of the lower courts and defined a ten-step test for Métis rights, based on modified tests from the previous Indian Aboriginal rights decisions in R. v. Sparrow and R. v. Van der Peet. The unanimous decision was given by the Court.

== The Powley test ==
Métis people seeking to exercise Aboriginal rights of hunting and fishing must show that the practice in question relates to an entrenched practice of a rights-bearing Métis community prior to European political and legal control and that they are members of the corresponding modern Métis community by both self-identification and acceptance within the community.

Thus, if a Métis group of people established a rights-bearing community distinct from any Indian or Inuit Aboriginal groups from which it had descended, practices that the community exercised prior to European control may be Section 35(1) rights.

The Powley test is designed to identify whether or not a specified right can be constitutionally granted to the individual. It is a modification of the Van der Peet test, consisting of ten components which are intended to determine the characteristics of the proposed right, such as "whether the proposed right is a practice integral to Métis culture, whether the community it is connected to is Métis, what the historical time-frame of this right is, whether the right was extinguished or infringed upon, [etc.]." The components are as follows:

1. Characterization of the right: The specific right being claimed must be identified. In the case of the Powley duo, the right being claimed was that of hunting for food, based upon their shooting a bull moose to provide food for winter on the outskirts of Sault Ste. Marie.
2. Identification of a historic community: To justify the granting of rights, "the existence of an identifiable Metis community must be demonstrated with some degree of continuity and stability in order to support a site-specific aboriginal rights claim." This group must have lived together in the same general area and shared a common way of life over a significant period of time. In the relevant case, a distinctive Métis community was found to have existed in the Upper Great Lakes from the mid-17th century onward, reaching a peak around 1850.
3. Identification of a contemporary community: Aboriginal rights must be grounded in the presence of a traceable, continuously existing historic community self-identifying as Métis from which the individual can derive ancestry in the present day. That community must be found to have existed as a distinctly Métis community priority to the advent of European legal and political control over the specified territory. The Sault Ste. Marie community was found to have persisted in spite of the loss of much of its traditional territory, and its decreased visibility after the signing of the Robinson-Huron Treaty of 1850.
4. Verification of membership: Though rights groups recommend the establishment of standardized identification practices to ground legal claims, the court set out 3 generalized components to guide self-identification. The first is the fact of self-identification, which cannot be only recently pronounced. The second is a traceable ancestral connection to a distinct Métis community; though no specific blood quantum level is required to substantiate this claim, there must be reasonable grounds to suggest that the individual is connected to the community by birth or adoptive integration. The third is acceptance within the community. This cannot be reduced solely to an individual's participation in that community's political organizations, as acceptance must be based upon the community's unique membership criteria. Means of proof can include active and lasting participation in community activities as well as witness testimony from established members of the community. The court found no considerable evidence against the assertion that the Powley duo were members of the Sault Ste. Marie Métis.
5. Time-frame of the practice: There must be an established time in which an integral practice was "forever changed" by European contact. The case for Métis differs for that of other Aboriginal groups because of their community necessarily developing after European contact with Aboriginal peoples. Thus, a legitimate timeframe was determined by the court to be "post-contact but pre-control," meaning the time in which practices were established prior to the advent of full assertion of European legal and political administration of the region pertinent to the community.
6. Cultural integrality of the practice: The right must reflect the community's historical relationship to the land. The court made use of a 1998 report by Dr. A.J. Ray to determine that the specific fundamental feature of the Sault Ste. Marie community was their "earn[ing] a substantial part of their livelihood off of the land." This is not strictly determined. Though a sizeable portion of the community's subsistence derived from fishing, hunting nonetheless played an important role. The specific resource harvested could not be used to determine the right, such that even if moose had not historically been a significant source of food, hunting of them was nonetheless covered.
7. Historical continuity of the practice: It must be proven that the right reflects a continuously integral practice. This means that the right must align with historically significant cultural features of the community, and have been continuously practiced up to modern day. There is some flexibility in this requirement that allows for cultural evolution and development over time, but the fundamental basis of the practice must remain relatively unchanged.
8. Extinguishment of the right: Certain rights of Métis may have been extinguished (annulled) by certain government actions, including constitutional enumeration, parliamentary legislation, or agreement with an Aboriginal/Métis community. The court found that the government's claim of extinguishment was unfounded because it was based in the Robinson-Huron Treaty, from which Métis were explicitly excluded.
9. Infringement on the right: The government may have the right to infringe (limit) certain rights, but this must be established and supported by just cause. In any case, it must be determined what right was infringed upon. The court found that the government had failed to recognize Métis' special access to certain natural resources (i.e hunting), thus infringing upon the protected historical practices of the Sault Ste. Marie Métis community.
10. Justification for infringement: If a right has been infringed upon, the government must provide justification for this infringement. This may include the endangerment of conservation efforts, risks to public health or safety, or other potential threats stemming from the free practice of the right. In the case of the Sault Ste. Marie duo, the court determined that there was no existential threat to the moose population. Even if there had been, the Métis community would still be entitled to a "priority allocation to satisfy [the community's] subsistence needs" as determined in R v Sparrow. The government was found not to have a right to fully deny Métis' right to hunt for food. The government could theoretically point to the difficulty of confirming an individual's membership within a protected community as reason to deny them the right, though this cannot be exaggerated, and is dependent upon an individual's ability to meet the test's proof of identity obligations.

== Implications ==
The Powley case served as a landmark ruling for the Métis communities of Canada, as it established legal recognition of a distinct Métis identity, and a legal rationale for the qualification of that identity. Though it specifically concerned hunting and fishing rights, it is thought that the case opened the door to further discussion of Métis' right to self-government and self-determination, based upon the fact that the latter saw some development by means of the precedent set by R v Sparrow. Legal scholars have described it as a "sound but circumscribed initial step in the development of a test for Métis Aboriginal rights".

Urban Métis were excluded from the Powley decision, but the public discourse that arose as a result of the case has further advanced dialogue on who should be identified as Metis and the rights owed to them as members of an established native community.

== See also ==
- Canadian Aboriginal case law
- The Canadian Crown and First Nations, Inuit and Métis
- Daniels v Canada (Indian Affairs and Northern Development): The third of the Métis Trifecta cases
- Indian Act
- Indian Health Transfer Policy (Canada)
- Numbered Treaties
