= R v Pamajewon =

- Supreme Court of Canada

Hearing: February 26, 1996 Judgment: August 22, 1996
- Full case name: Howard Pamajewon and Roger Jones v Her Majesty The Queen; Arnold Gardner, Jack Pitchenese and Allan Gardner v Her Majesty The Queen
- Citations: [1996] 2 S.C.R. 821
- Ruling: Pamajewon appeal dismissed.

Court membership
- Chief Justice: Antonio Lamer; Puisne Justices: Gérard La Forest, Claire L'Heureux-Dubé, John Sopinka, Charles Gonthier, Peter Cory, Beverley McLachlin, Frank Iacobucci, John C. Major

Reasons given
- Majority: Lamer C.J., joined by La Forest, Sopinka, Gonthier, Cory, McLachlin, Iacobucci and Major JJ.
- Concurrence: L’Heureux‑Dubé J.

Laws applied
- R v Van der Peet, [1996] 2 S.C.R. 507

R v Pamajewon, [1996] 2 S.C.R. 821, is a leading Supreme Court of Canada decision on Aboriginal self-government under section 35(1) of the Constitution Act, 1982. The Court held that the right to self-government, if it exists, is subject to reasonable limitations and excluded the right to control high-stakes gambling.

== Background ==
The First Nations of Shawanaga and Eagle Lake passed laws enabling high-stakes gambling to take place on the reserves. The laws were not validly enacted under the Indian Act, however, the bands justified the laws as an exercise of their power of self-government. The bands were charged for keeping a common gaming house under the Criminal Code.

The issue before the Court was whether the right to control high-stakes gambling was protected under section 35(1) of the Constitution Act, 1982. The claimants argued that gambling was a part of their distinct identity in a similar way as fishing and hunting. The Court of Appeal disagreed with the bands and found that the right to gambling was not protected under section 35(1), because it failed to meet the criteria set forth in the Van der Peet test.

== Opinion of the Court ==
Chief Justice Lamer wrote for the majority. He stated that "assuming without deciding that s. 35(1) includes self-government claims", the existence of a right to gambling must be analysed using the test from R v Van der Peet. Lamer decided against characterizing the right as the right to "manage the use of their lands", but rather as the right to "participate in, and regulate, gambling activities on their respective reserve lands".

According to Van der Peet, the right must have existed prior to contact and must have been an integral part of their distinctive culture. There was evidence that the Ojibwa band gambled prior to first contact, but was not on any large scale, nor was it significant to be an integral part of the distinctive cultures of the bands. Consequently, Lamer found that there was no right to high-stakes gambling under the Aboriginal power of self-government.

== See also ==
- The Canadian Crown and First Nations, Inuit and Métis
- Canadian Aboriginal case law
- Numbered Treaties
- Indian Act
- Section Thirty-five of the Constitution Act, 1982
- Indian Health Transfer Policy (Canada)
