= 1996 reasons of the Supreme Court of Canada =

The list below consists of the reasons delivered from the bench by the Supreme Court of Canada during 1996. This list, however, does not include decisions on motions.

== Reasons ==
Delivered the Court's reason
Joined the Court's reason
Filed a concurrence
Joined a concurrence
Filed a dissent
Joined a dissent
Filed a concurrence/dissent
Joined a concurrence/dissent
Did not participate in the judgment
Did not participate in the final disposition of the judgment
Not a member of the Court at the time of hearing or delivering
- Decisions that do not note a Justice delivering the Court's reason are per coram.
- Multiple concurrences and dissents within a case are numbered, with joining votes numbered accordingly. Justices occasionally join multiple reasons in a single case; each vote is subdivided accordingly.
- Multiple unnumbered reasons are jointly written or delivered.
- Decisions that are given orally from the bench are denoted by a "V"; per coram decisions delivered orally from the bench only note a "V" on the most senior justice on the panel.
- An asterisk ( * ) in the Court's opinion denotes that it was only a majority in part or a plurality.

Case name	Argued	Decided	Lamer	La Forest	L'Heureux-Dubé	Sopinka	Gonthier	Cory	McLachlin	Iacobucci	Major
St. Marys Paper Inc. (Re), [1996] 1 S.C.R. 3	January 22, 1996	January 22, 1996		V							
Rubin v. Canada (Clerk of the Privy Council), [1996] 1 S.C.R. 6	January 24, 1996	January 24, 1996		V							
R. v. Evans, [1996] 1 S.C.R. 8	May 4, 1995	January 25, 1996		1	2		2				3
R. v. Thibert, [1996] 1 S.C.R. 37	November 9, 1995	January 25, 1996									
R. v. Dewald, [1996] 1 S.C.R. 68	January 26, 1996	January 26, 1996				V					
R. v. Fitt; R. v. Kouyas, [1996] 1 S.C.R. 70	January 29, 1996	January 29, 1996									
R. v. Austin, [1996] 1 S.C.R. 72	January 31, 1996	January 31, 1996									
Swantje v. Canada, [1996] 1 S.C.R. 73	February 2, 1996	February 2, 1996									
Mooring v. Canada (National Parole Board), [1996] 1 S.C.R. 75	May 31, 1995	February 8, 1996	1	2							
R. v. Edwards, [1996] 1 S.C.R. 128	June 1, 1995	February 8, 1996		1	2		3				
Chablis Textiles Inc. (Trustee of) v. London Life Insurance Co., [1996] 1 S.C.R. 160	October 13, 1995	February 8, 1996									
Esmail v. Petro-Canada, [1997] 2 SCR 3	February 8, 1996	February 8, 1996									
Helo Enterprises Ltd. v. Standard Trust Co. (Liquidators of), [1996] 1 S.C.R. 183	February 21, 1996	February 21, 1996									
R. v. Gagnon, [1996] 1 S.C.R. 185	February 21, 1996	February 21, 1996									
Reference re Amendments to the Residential Tenancies Act (N.S.), [1996] 1 S.C.R. 186	October 5, 1995	February 22, 1996	1				2				
Case name	Argued	Decided	Lamer	La Forest	L'Heureux-Dubé	Sopinka	Gonthier	Cory	McLachlin	Iacobucci	Major
Schwartz v. Canada, [1996] 1 S.C.R. 254	October 6, 1995	February 22, 1996									
Tennant v. M.N.R., [1996] 1 S.C.R. 305	November 8, 1995	February 22, 1996									
Royal Bank of Canada v. North American Life Assurance Co., [1996] 1 S.C.R. 325	November 8, 1995	February 22, 1996									
Royal Oak Mines Inc. v. Canada (Labour Relations Board), [1996] 1 S.C.R. 369	October 30, 1995	February 22, 1996									
R. v. Keegstra, [1996] 1 S.C.R. 458	February 28, 1996	February 28, 1996									
R. v. Marinaro, [1996] 1 S.C.R. 462	February 29, 1996	February 29, 1996									
R. v. Martin, [1996] 1 S.C.R. 463	March 1, 1996	March 1, 1996									
United States of America v. Jamieson, [1996] 1 S.C.R. 465	March 19, 1996	March 19, 1996									
United States of America v. Whitley, [1996] 1 S.C.R. 467	March 19, 1996	March 19, 1996									
United States of America v. Ross, [1996] 1 S.C.R. 469	March 19, 1996	March 19, 1996									
R. v. V.D.A. (A.F.), [1996] 1 S.C.R. 471	March 21, 1996	March 21, 1996									
R. v. Majid, [1996] 1 S.C.R. 472	March 21, 1996	March 21, 1996									
R. v. Burke, [1996] 1 S.C.R. 474	May 26, 1995	March 21, 1996									
R. v. M. (C.A.), [1996] 1 S.C.R. 500	June 1, 1995	March 21, 1996									
Gould v. Yukon Order of Pioneers, [1996] 1 S.C.R. 571	October 3, 1995	March 21, 1996			1				2		
Case name	Argued	Decided	Lamer	La Forest	L'Heureux-Dubé	Sopinka	Gonthier	Cory	McLachlin	Iacobucci	Major
R. v. Calder, [1996] 1 S.C.R. 660	November 9, 1995	March 21, 1996									
R. v. Robinson, [1996] 1 S.C.R. 683	December 7, 1995	March 21, 1996									
R. v. McMaster, [1996] 1 S.C.R. 740	December 7, 1995	March 21, 1996									
R. v. Lemky, [1996] 1 S.C.R. 757	December 8, 1995	March 21, 1996									
R. v. Badger, [1996] 1 S.C.R. 771	May 1, 2, 1995	April 3, 1996									
Ross v. New Brunswick School District No. 15, [1996] 1 S.C.R. 825	October 31, 1995	April 3, 1996									
United States of America v. Leon, [1996] 1 S.C.R. 888	March 20, 1996	April 3, 1996									
D. (J.L.) v. Vallée, [1996] 1 S.C.R. 893	March 25, 1996	March 25, 1996	V								
R. v. Richard, [1996] 1 S.C.R. 896	March 28, 1996	March 28, 1996				V					
Martin v. Beaudry, [1996] 1 S.C.R. 898	April 24, 1996	April 24, 1996	V								
Coopérants, Mutual Life Insurance Society (Liquidator of) v. Dubois, [1996] 1 S.C.R. 900	October 4, 1995	April 25, 1996									
R. v. Lewis, [1996] 1 S.C.R. 921	November 29, 1995	April 25, 1996									
Alberta (Treasury Branches) v. M.N.R.; Toronto-Dominion Bank v. M.N.R., [1996] 1 S.C.R. 963	October 12, 1995	April 25, 1996									
R. v. Nikal, [1996] 1 S.C.R. 1013	November 30, 1995	April 25, 1996									
R. v. Laporte, [1996] 1 S.C.R. 1074	April 26, 1996	April 26, 1996				V					
Case name	Argued	Decided	Lamer	La Forest	L'Heureux-Dubé	Sopinka	Gonthier	Cory	McLachlin	Iacobucci	Major
R. v. McConnell, [1996] 1 S.C.R. 1075	April 30, 1996	April 30, 1996		V							
Newfoundland Association of Public Employees v. Newfoundland (Green Bay Health Care Centre), [1996] 2 S.C.R. 3	February 29, 1996	May 2, 1996									
Gordon v. Goertz, [1996] 2 S.C.R. 27	December 6, 1995	May 2, 1996									
W. (V.) v. S. (D.), [1996] 2 S.C.R. 108	December 6, 1995	May 2, 1996									
R. v. Mara Properties Ltd., [1996] 2 S.C.R. 161	May 21, 1996	May 21, 1996		V							
R. v. Wright, [1996] 2 S.C.R. 163	May 22, 1996	May 22, 1996		V							
R. v. Rarru, [1996] 2 S.C.R. 165	May 22, 1996	May 22, 1996				V					
R. v. Labonté, [1996] 2 S.C.R. 167	May 28, 1996	May 28, 1996	V								
R. v. Royer, [1996] 2 S.C.R. 169	May 29, 1996	May 29, 1996									
R. v. Audet, [1996] 2 S.C.R. 171	January 25, 1996	May 30, 1996									
R. v. Terry, [1996] 2 S.C.R. 207	February 20, 1996	May 30, 1996									
R. v. Sarson, [1996] 2 S.C.R. 223	February 22, 1996	May 30, 1996									
R. v. Seymour, [1996] 2 S.C.R. 252	February 22, 1996	May 30, 1996									
R. v. Hebert, [1996] 2 S.C.R. 272	April 25, 1996	May 30, 1996									
R. v. Laperrière, [1996] 2 S.C.R. 284	June 11, 1996	June 11, 1996									
Case name	Argued	Decided	Lamer	La Forest	L'Heureux-Dubé	Sopinka	Gonthier	Cory	McLachlin	Iacobucci	Major
R. v. Liakas, [1996] 2 S.C.R. 286	June 13, 1996	June 13, 1996									
R. v. McKarris, [1996] 2 S.C.R. 287	June 14, 1996	June 14, 1996									
R. v. Clement, [1996] 2 S.C.R. 289	June 14, 1996	June 14, 1996									
R. v. R. (D.), [1996] 2 S.C.R. 291	January 30, 1996	June 20, 1996									
Béliveau St-Jacques v. Fédération des employées et employésde services publics inc., [1996] 2 S.C.R. 345	November 3, 1995	June 20, 1996									
Semelhago v. Paramadevan, [1996] 2 S.C.R. 415	January 31, 1996	June 20, 1996									
International Longshoremen's and Warehousemen's Union, Ship and Dock Foremen, Local 514 v. Prince Rupert Grain Ltd., [1996] 2 S.C.R. 432	February 1, 1996	June 20, 1996									
R. v. Michaud, [1996] 2 S.C.R. 458	June 20, 1996	June 20, 1996									
R. v. McCarthy, [1996] 2 S.C.R. 460	June 21, 1996	June 21, 1996									
R. v. Bardales, [1996] 2 S.C.R. 461	June 21, 1996	June 21, 1996									
R. v. Goldhart, [1996] 2 S.C.R. 463	March 27, 1996	July 4, 1996									
Brotherhood of Maintenance of Way Employees Canadian Pacific System Federation v. Canadian Pacific Ltd., [1996] 2 S.C.R. 495	April 22, 1996	July 4, 1996									
R. v. Van der Peet, [1996] 2 S.C.R. 507	November 27, 28, 29, 1995	August 21, 1996									
R. v. N.T.C. Smokehouse Ltd., [1996] 2 S.C.R. 672	November 27, 28, 29, 1995	August 21, 1996									
R. v. Gladstone, [1996] 2 S.C.R. 723	November 27, 28, 29, 1995	August 21, 1996									
Case name	Argued	Decided	Lamer	La Forest	L'Heureux-Dubé	Sopinka	Gonthier	Cory	McLachlin	Iacobucci	Major
R. v. Pamajewon, [1996] 2 S.C.R. 821	February 26, 1996	August 22, 1996									
P. (S.) v. R. (M.), [1996] 2 S.C.R. 842	November 3, 1995	August 22, 1996									
Harvey v. New Brunswick (Attorney General), [1996] 2 S.C.R. 876	February 19, 1996	August 22, 1996									
Ontario Home Builders' Association v. York Region Board of Education, [1996] 2 S.C.R. 929	October 10, 11, 1995	August 22, 1996									
MacMillan Bloedel Ltd. v. Simpson, [1996] 2 S.C.R. 1048	April 22, 1996	August 22, 1996									
D'Amato v. Badger, [1996] 2 S.C.R. 1071	April 25, 1996	August 22, 1996									
Michaud v. Quebec (Attorney General), [1996] 3 S.C.R. 3	January 25, 1996	September 12, 1996									
Centre communautaire juridique de l'Estrie v. Sherbrooke (City), [1996] 3 S.C.R. 84	April 29, 1996	September 12, 1996									
R. v. Adams, [1996] 3 S.C.R. 101	December 5, 1995	October 3, 1996									
R. v. Côté, [1996] 3 S.C.R. 139	June 17, 1996	October 3, 1996									
R. v. Knox, [1996] 3 S.C.R. 199	March 28, 1996	October 3, 1996									
Quebec (Public Curator) v. Syndicat national des employés de l'hôpital St-Ferdinand, [1996] 3 S.C.R. 211	May 2, 1996	October 3, 1996									
Augustus v. Gosset, [1996] 3 S.C.R. 268	June 10, 1996	October 3, 1996									
R. v. Jacques, [1996] 3 S.C.R. 312	February 2, 1996	October 3, 1996									
Guimond v. Quebec (Attorney General), [1996] 3 S.C.R. 347	May 27, 1996	October 3, 1996									
Case name	Argued	Decided	Lamer	La Forest	L'Heureux-Dubé	Sopinka	Gonthier	Cory	McLachlin	Iacobucci	Major
R. v. G. (R.M.), [1996] 3 S.C.R. 362	June 20, 1996	October 3, 1996									
Katz v. Vancouver Stock Exchange, [1996] 3 S.C.R. 405	October 3, 1996	October 3, 1996									
R. v. Parisé, [1996] 3 S.C.R. 408	October 4, 1996	October 4, 1996									
R. v. Pittman, [1996] 3 S.C.R. 410	October 4, 1996	October 4, 1996									
R. v. Laverty, [1996] 3 S.C.R. 412		October 11, 1996									
R. v. Keshane, [1996] 3 S.C.R. 413		October 11, 1996									
Manulife Bank of Canada v. Conlin, [1996] 3 S.C.R. 415	May 30, 1996	October 31, 1996									
Athey v. Leonati, [1996] 3 S.C.R. 458	June 12, 1996	October 31, 1996									
Canadian Broadcasting Corp. v. New Brunswick (Attorney General), [1996] 3 S.C.R. 480	March 29, 1996	October 31, 1996									
R. v. Richard, [1996] 3 S.C.R. 525	April 23, 1996	October 31, 1996									
Verdun v. Toronto-Dominion Bank, [1996] 3 S.C.R. 550	April 29, 1996	October 31, 1996									
Battlefords and District Co-operative Ltd. v. Gibbs, [1996] 3 S.C.R. 566	May 1, 1996	October 31, 1996									
R. v. Biscette, [1996] 3 S.C.R. 599	October 31, 1996	October 31, 1996									
R. v. Pelletier, [1996] 3 S.C.R. 601	October 31, 1996	October 31, 1996									
R. v. Sherry, [1996] 3 S.C.R. 602	November 1, 1996	November 1, 1996									
Case name	Argued	Decided	Lamer	La Forest	L'Heureux-Dubé	Sopinka	Gonthier	Cory	McLachlin	Iacobucci	Major
R. v. Howell, [1996] 3 S.C.R. 604	November 1, 1996	November 1, 1996									
Hospitality Investments Ltd. v. Everett Lord Building Construction Ltd., [1996] 3 S.C.R. 605	November 8, 1996	November 8, 1996									
R. v. Paternak, [1996] 3 S.C.R. 607	November 8, 1996	November 8, 1996									
Adler v. Ontario, [1996] 3 S.C.R. 609	January 23, 24, 1996	November 21, 1996									
Boma Manufacturing Ltd. v. Canadian Imperial Bank of Commerce, [1996] 3 S.C.R. 727	March 26, 1996	November 21, 1996									
R. v. Dawson, [1996] 3 S.C.R. 783	June 12, 1996	November 21, 1996									
R. v. Rockey, [1996] 3 S.C.R. 829	June 13, 1996	November 21, 1996									
Cooper v. Canada (Human Rights Commission), [1996] 3 S.C.R. 854	June 18, 1996	November 21, 1996									
2747-3174 Québec Inc. v. Quebec (Régie des permis d'alcool), [1996] 3 S.C.R. 919	March 27, 1996	November 21, 1996									
R. v. Hawkins, [1996] 3 S.C.R. 1043	March 18, 1996	November 28, 1996									
R. v. I. (R.R.), [1996] 3 S.C.R. 1124	November 29, 1996	November 29, 1996									
R. v. Bramwell, [1996] 3 S.C.R. 1126	November 29, 1996	November 29, 1996									
R. v. Hinchey, [1996] 3 S.C.R. 1128	April 26, 1996	December 12, 1996									
R. v. Nikolovski, [1996] 3 S.C.R. 1197	October 3, 1996	December 12, 1996									
