= Van der Peet Test =

Legal test of an "Aboriginal right" in Canada

The Van der Peet test or the Integral to a Distinctive Culture Test is a legal test used in Canada to determine whether an activity is considered an "Aboriginal right" under section 35 of the Canadian Constitution. The test was established in the landmark Supreme Court of Canada case R. v. Van der Peet (1996). The test has three parts, which must all be satisfied for the activity to be considered an Aboriginal right:

1. The practice, custom, or tradition must be an element of a practice, custom, or tradition integral to the distinctive culture of the Aboriginal group claiming the right.
2. The practice, custom, or tradition must have existed prior to contact with Europeans.
3. The practice, custom, or tradition must have been central to Aboriginal society's way of life.

If all three parts of the test are met, then the activity is considered an Aboriginal right and is protected under section 35 of the Canadian Constitution. This test has been mainly criticized for its narrow focus on pre-contact practices, its unfair burden placed on Indigenous peoples, and the power it gives the government to extinguish Aboriginal rights.

== Introduction ==
The Van der Peet test is a legal framework used by Canadian courts to determine the scope and content of Indigenous rights. The test was established by the Supreme Court of Canada in the 1996 case of R v Van der Peet, which involved the Musqueam First Nation in British Columbia and their traditional fishing practices.

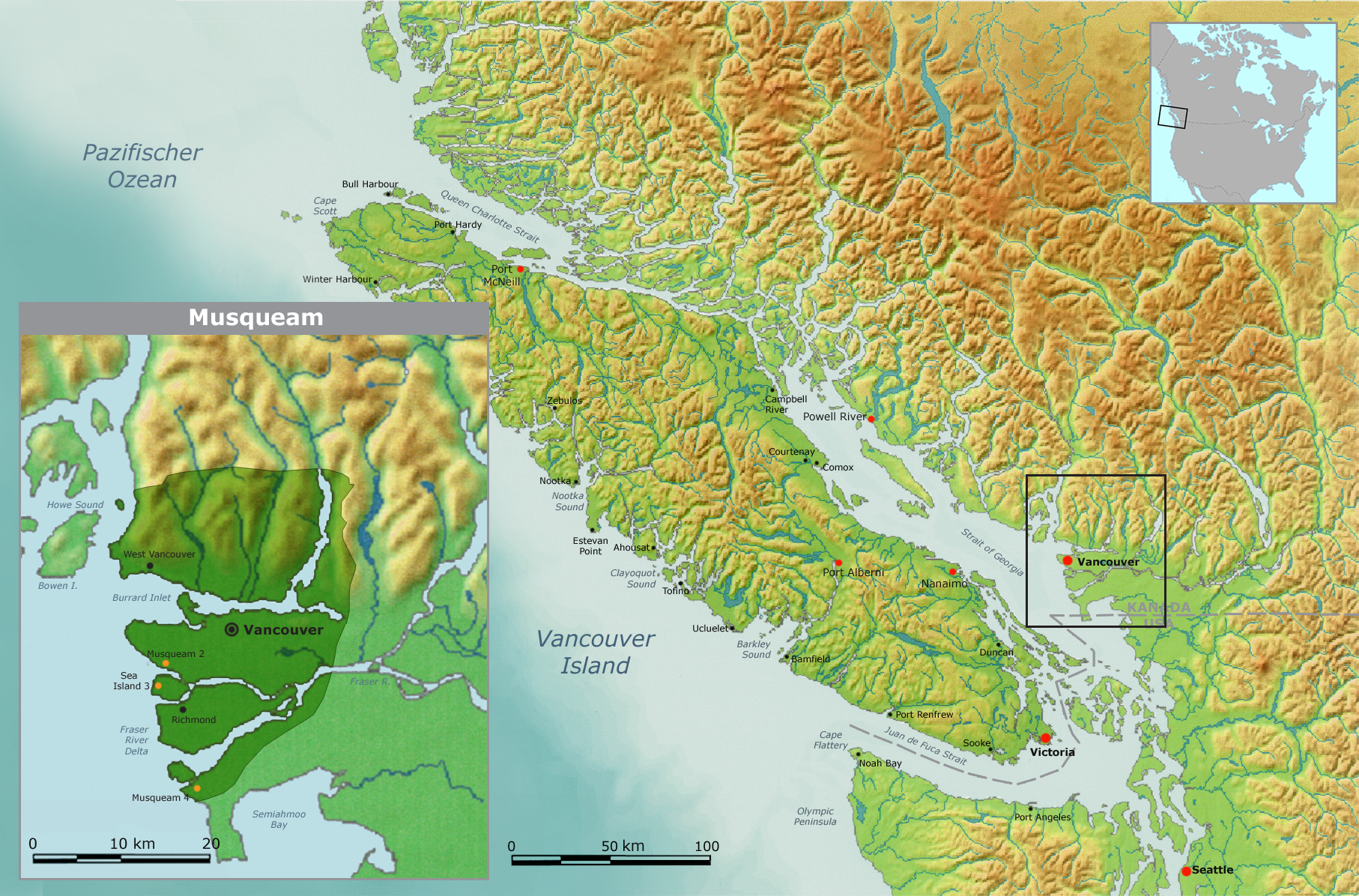
Map of traditional Musqueam tribal territory

The recognition and protection of Indigenous rights in Canada have a long and complex history, marked by centuries of colonialism, dispossession, and assimilation policies. Section 35 of the Canadian Constitution, which was added in 1982 as part of the Canadian Charter of Rights and Freedoms, recognizes and affirms the existing Aboriginal and treaty rights of Indigenous peoples in Canada. However, the meaning and scope of these rights were not clearly defined, and Indigenous peoples continued to face significant barriers to exercising their rights in practice.

In response to these challenges, Canadian courts developed the duty to consult and accommodate Indigenous peoples, which requires the government to consult with Indigenous communities and accommodate their interests when making decisions that affect their rights and interests. However, the duty to consult and accommodate did not provide a clear legal framework for recognizing and protecting Indigenous rights. Therefore, the following cases ensued.

== Legal foundations ==
=== R v Sparrow ===
R v Sparrow is a landmark case in Canadian constitutional law, which the Supreme Court of Canada decided in 1990. The case involved Musqueam First Nation member Ronald Edward Sparrow, who was charged with fishing with a drift net longer than permitted under federal regulations. At trial, Sparrow argued that the Musqueam people had a constitutionally protected right to fish for food and ceremonial purposes, which should take priority over federal regulations. The trial judge found that the Musqueam people had an Aboriginal right to fish, but that the federal regulations were justified to ensure the conservation of fish stocks. The case was appealed to the Supreme Court of Canada, which ruled in favor of Sparrow in 1990.

The court held that the fishing regulations infringed on the Aboriginal rights of the Musqueam First Nation and that the infringement was not justified under section 35(1) of the Constitution Act, 1982. The court established a test for determining when the government can infringe on Aboriginal rights, known as the Sparrow test. The Sparrow test requires that any infringement on Aboriginal rights must be

1. Based on a compelling and substantial objective,
2. Carried out in a way that minimally impairs the rights, and
3. Consistent with the Crown's fiduciary duty to Indigenous peoples.

Overall, R v Sparrow was a significant decision involving Indigenous rights in Canada, and it continues to have an impact on Indigenous communities today.

Stó:lō First Nation

=== R v Van der Peet ===
Dorothy Van der Peet, a member of the Stó:lō First Nation in British Columbia, faced charges for selling salmon that had been caught under a food-fishing license. This type of license allowed Indigenous peoples to fish for sustenance and ceremonial purposes only and prohibited the sale of fish to non-Indigenous people. Van der Peet contested the charges, arguing that her right as an Indigenous person to sell fish was protected under Section 35 of the Constitution Act.

==== The Van der Peet Test ====
As a result, the Van der Peet test was established by the Supreme Court of Canada in 1996, from the R v Van der Peet court case, as a three-part test for determining the scope and content of Indigenous rights. The test consists of the following three stages:

1. The first stage involves determining whether the claimant has an Aboriginal right or title. This requires demonstrating that the practice or activity in question was an integral part of the claimant's pre-contact culture and that it was a practice or activity that was protected by the claimant's Aboriginal right or title.
2. The second stage involves determining whether the practice or activity in question is still important to the claimant's culture today. This requires showing that the practice or activity has a present-day objective and subjective importance to the claimant's culture.
3. The third stage involves determining whether the practice or activity is consistent with the principles of Crown sovereignty and the fiduciary duty owed by the Crown to Indigenous peoples. This requires showing that the practice or activity is not inconsistent with the Crown's ability to manage and regulate the resources in question in the public interest.

The Van der Peet test has been applied in numerous cases since it was established, including cases involving fishing, hunting, gathering practices, and cultural and spiritual practices. Examples of cases where the Van der Peet test has been applied include R v Gladstone, which involved the Cowichan Tribes' traditional fishing practices, and R v Kapp, which involved the Stó:lō Nation's right to harvest cedar bark.

== Criticisms and controversiality ==
=== Criticisms of the Van der Peet Test ===
Despite its widespread use in Canadian law, the Van der Peet test has been subject to a range of criticisms. One of the main criticisms of the test is its narrow focus on pre-contact practices, which has been seen by some as a form of cultural essentialism that fails to take into account the dynamic and evolving nature of Indigenous cultures and practices. Other criticisms of the Van der Peet test include its reliance on the principles of Crown sovereignty and the fiduciary duty owed by the Crown to Indigenous peoples, which has been seen by some as reinforcing colonial power structures and limiting the ability of Indigenous peoples to exercise their rights in practice. There have also been concerns about the application of the test in practice, with some arguing that the test is too complex and difficult to apply consistently across different cases. Others point out that this test gives the government too much power to extinguish Aboriginal rights.

=== Controversiality ===
The Van der Peet test is controversial because it sets a high bar for Indigenous peoples to establish their rights under section 35 of the Canadian Constitution. Critics argue that the test imposes an ethnocentric framework that fails to recognize the diversity and complexity of Indigenous legal systems and cultures.

Some critics argue that the Van der Peet test creates an unfair burden on Indigenous peoples to prove the existence and continuity of their traditional practices, customs, or traditions. This can be difficult for Indigenous communities who have faced centuries of colonialism, cultural genocide, and forced assimilation, which has often disrupted or destroyed their traditional ways of life.

Furthermore, some Indigenous scholars and activists argue that the Van der Peet test places too much emphasis on the historical continuity of Indigenous rights, rather than recognizing the dynamic and evolving nature of Indigenous legal systems and cultures. They argue that Indigenous legal systems should be recognized and respected as living, dynamic legal systems that continue to evolve and adapt over time.

== Application of the Van der Peet Test in Canadian impact assessments ==
The Van der Peet test has been applied to impact assessments in Canada in a number of ways. Impact assessments evaluate the potential social, economic, cultural, and environmental impacts of proposed projects, policies, or activities. These assessments can have significant implications for Indigenous peoples, as they may be affected by the impacts of development on their lands, resources, and communities. Under the duty to consult and accommodate, governments and other actors are required to consult with Indigenous communities and consider their concerns when making decisions that may affect them. This duty includes consulting with affected communities and taking steps to mitigate any potential adverse impacts on Indigenous rights and interests.

The Van der Peet test has been used to assess the potential impacts of development on Indigenous rights and interests. The test requires courts to consider the nature and scope of the Indigenous activity in question, the relationship between the Indigenous people and the activity, and the specific nature of the government regulation or restriction at issue.

In the context of impact assessments, the test has been used to evaluate whether a proposed project or activity will have an adverse impact on Indigenous rights and whether the proposed mitigation measures are sufficient to address these impacts. The test has also been used to evaluate whether the government's consultation and accommodation efforts were sufficient to address these impacts.

In recent years, Canadian courts have increasingly applied the Van der Peet test in the context of impact assessments. For example, in the case of Tsleil-Waututh Nation v. Canada (Attorney General), the Federal Court of Appeal applied the test to evaluate the government's decision to approve the Trans Mountain pipeline expansion project. The court found that the government had not adequately consulted with Indigenous communities or considered their concerns, and ordered the government to redo its consultation process. Nonetheless, the same criticisms about the Van der Peet test exist within the realm of impact assessments.

== Canadian impact assessments case examples ==
=== Northern Gateway Pipeline project ===
The proposed Northern Gateway Pipeline project would have transported crude oil from Alberta to British Columbia, crossing numerous Indigenous territories. The environmental assessment, which used the Van der Peet test to assess the potential impacts on Aboriginal rights, recommended that the project not proceed due to significant adverse effects on First Nations' Aboriginal rights and title. The project was ultimately rejected by the Canadian government in 2016 due to environmental concerns, Indigenous rights concerns, and the lack of social license for the project.

=== John Horgan Dam project ===
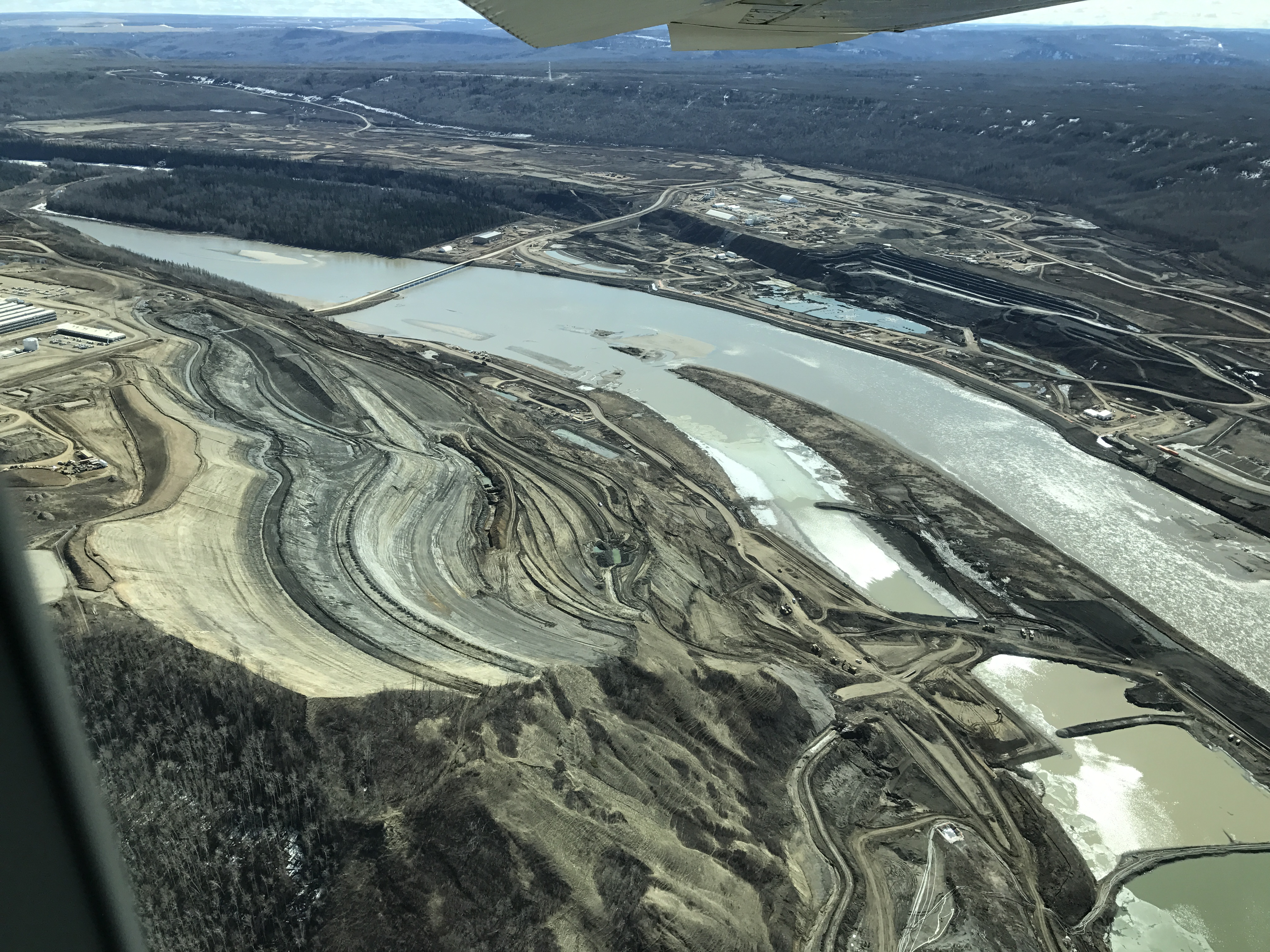
Site C dam site downstream, 2017

The John Horgan Dam project, a proposed hydroelectric dam in northeastern British Columbia, was subject to an environmental assessment that used the Van der Peet test to assess the potential impacts on Treaty 8 Aboriginal rights. Despite concerns raised by Treaty 8 First Nations about the infringement on their rights, the project was approved by the government of British Columbia in 2014. However, after years of legal challenges and protests, the project was ultimately canceled by the provincial government in 2017 due to concerns about escalating costs and the impact on Indigenous communities. Later on that year the project was reinstated and was completed in 2025.

=== Mackenzie Gas project ===
The Mackenzie Gas project was a proposed natural gas pipeline project that would have transported natural gas from the Mackenzie Delta to markets in Canada and the United States, crossing the traditional territories of the Dene and Inuvialuit peoples. It was initially proposed in the 1970s but was repeatedly delayed due to various economic, regulatory, and environmental concerns (Berger Inquiry). The most recent environmental assessment, which used the Van der Peet test to assess the potential impacts on Aboriginal rights, recommended that the project not proceed due to significant adverse effects on the Aboriginal rights of the Dene and Inuvialuit, particularly with respect to hunting, trapping, and fishing. The project was ultimately rejected by the Canadian government in 2017 due to unfavorable economic conditions, and opposition from Indigenous communities and environmental groups.

=== Enbridge Line 9 Pipeline project ===
Enbridge Line 9 is a pipeline that runs from Sarnia, Ontario to Montreal, Quebec and transports crude oil and other petroleum products. Line 9 was originally built in the 1970s to transport crude oil from western Canada to refineries in eastern Canada but was later reversed in 1998 to transport imported crude oil from eastern Canada to refineries in Ontario. In 2015, Enbridge received approval from the National Energy Board to reverse the flow of Line 9 again, to transport crude oil from western Canada to eastern Canada. The environmental assessment, which used the Van der Peet test to assess the potential impacts on Aboriginal rights, recommended that the project not go through due to significant adverse effects on the affected First Nations. However, the project was ultimately approved by the federal government in 2015. In 2018, the Federal Court of Appeal ruled that the government had not adequately consulted with affected Indigenous communities, and the government subsequently launched a new round of consultations. The project remains in operation while the consultation process continues.
