= Duty to consult and accommodate =

In Canada, the duty to consult and accommodate with Indigenous Peoples arises when the Crown contemplates actions or decisions that may affect Aboriginal or Treaty rights. This duty arises most often in the context of natural resource extraction such as mining, forestry, oil, and gas.

It is very difficult to practically separate the duty to consult and accommodate because consultation may lead to the fulfillment of the duty to accommodate and consultation is meaningless if accommodation is excluded from the outset. As such, the two are intertwined and must be addressed together.

The broad purpose of the duty to consult and accommodate is to advance the objective of reconciliation of pre-existing Aboriginal societies with the assertion of Crown Sovereignty. This duty flows from the honour of the Crown and its fiduciary duty to Indigenous peoples. The obligation to provide consultation and a decision-making process that is compatible with the honour of the Crown is embedded in Section Thirty-five of the Constitution Act, 1982 and Treaties. In a Treaty context, the duty to consult serves to remedy "a procedural gap" in the Treaty.

The Supreme Court of Canada has acknowledged that there are gaps in the texts of historical numbered treaties. This means that the oral negotiations surrounding treaty negotiations are necessary to fully understand the rights and obligations to which treaties give rise. For example, the Supreme Court of Canada has stated that obligations arising from historical treaties encompass an oral promise that "the same means of earning a livelihood would continue after the treaty as existed before it." The Court further stated that "a large element of the Treaty 8 negotiations were the assurances of continuity in traditional patterns of economic activity. Continuity respects traditional patterns of activity and occupation." Therefore, orally negotiated historical treaties give rise to rights go beyond the right to hunt, fish and trap to include a right to maintain its traditional and cultural way of life as well as their traditional forms of economic activity.

The Crown constitutes both the Federal and Provincial governments. Therefore, the level of government contemplating an action or decision has the responsibility to consult and accommodate. Although in many provinces it is industry proponents that consult with Aboriginal rights holders, the ultimate substantive duty to ensure proper consultation and accommodation lies with the Crown; while procedural aspects can be delegated to other levels of government or to industry proponents, the honour of the Crown itself can never be delegated.

== Triggering the duty ==
The Supreme Court in Haida Nation v. British Columbia (Minister of Forests) created a three part test that, if met, gives rise to the duty to consult and accommodate on the part of the Crown.

First, the government has a real or constructive knowledge of a right. This tends to be less of an issue in the context of treaties that establish clear rights. However, some historical treaties are unclear. There has been much litigation over the content of the rights in the Peace and Friendship Treaties negotiated in the Maritimes in the mid-eighteenth century, which culminated in the R. v. Marshall decisions. Canadian courts have sometimes viewed the duty to consult differently depending on whether it involves infringing Aboriginal rights or the Crown's exercise of a right under a Treaty.

The second factor required to give rise to a duty to consult and accommodate is that a government action or decision relating to land and/or natural resource management within the Indigenous group's traditional territory is contemplated. Traditional territory includes reserve land, land subject to aboriginal title, and territory that the Indigenous group considers to be its traditional lands.

The third factor required to trigger a duty to consult and accommodate is that the government's decision has the potential to adversely impact the continued existence of a Treaty or Constitutional right. Courts are very clear that when reviewing evidence, they must take a "generous, purposive approach to [determine whether there is a potential adverse impact]." However, speculation is not enough to constitute "potential" adverse impact. A court may consider adverse impacts as speculative if there is a lack of evidence or evidence does not clearly demonstrate an adverse impact.

== Crown’s minimum obligations ==
Once the three factors from Haida have been established, the Crown possesses various minimum obligations to consult and, where necessary, to accommodate. The Crown possesses the constitutional obligation to:

- Inform itself of the impact of the proposed project on the Aboriginal rights holders in question, and communicate its findings.
- Provide notice and information regarding potential adverse impacts on Aboriginal rights holders.
- Consult with the Aboriginal rights holders regarding what studies need to be done to assess adverse impacts.
- Engage in meaningful consultation, which requires taking into account the Aboriginal rights holders’ perspectives, creating a clear and transparent process, and being responsive.
- Not act unilaterally.
- Consult and provide Aboriginal rights holders with information concerning the proposed project, decision, or action at each phase before decisions or actions have been taken.
- Engage directly with the potentially affected Aboriginal rights holders.
- Consult and accommodate in good faith.
- Solicit, listen to, and attempt to respond to the concerns of the Aboriginal rights holders.
- Attempt to minimize or mitigate adverse impacts on the Aboriginal rights holders.
- Demonstrate a willingness to make changes based on information that emerges during the consultation and accommodation process.
- Not rule out accommodation.

In addition to the above, the Crown cannot do the following when engaging in the process of consultation and accommodation:

- Take a "trust us" approach to information gathering and the assessment of impacts on First Nations’ rights and interests.
- Limit consultation to an opportunity to blow off steam rather than substantively addressing First Nations’ concerns.
- Promise to disclose information after-the-fact where that information can be made available or otherwise waiting to the last and final point in a series of decisions to consult.
- Limit consultation to site specific impacts.
- Focus on whether a particular process was followed as opposed to whether the results of consultation are reasonable in light of the degree of potential adverse impacts to treaty or aboriginal rights, well-being and culture.
- Infringe Aboriginal title rights in a way that would substantially deprive future generations of the benefit of the land.

== Determining the scope of the duty ==
There are several factors to consider when determining the scope of the Crown's duty to consult and accommodate. The two most important factors are the level of adverse impact and the strength of the Aboriginal rights or title claim. For Aboriginal rights holders who possess treaty rights or recognized Aboriginal rights, the second factor should not be an issue.

An adverse (or serious) impact occurs when there is a negative effect on the ability of aboriginal people to exercise their aboriginal or treaty rights. Adverse impact is a question of whether the conduct denies rights holders the means to exercise their rights in their preferred manner. Determining the level of adverse impact is very complex and technical, and requires input by various experts. It also involves predictions into the future as to the cumulative and long-term effects of a given project and regional development as a whole. The threshold for determining an adverse impact on Treaty Nations is low, as the Supreme Court in Mikisew Cree First Nation v Canada found that a winter road adjacent to Mikisew's reserve land had an adverse impact on their rights. Furthermore, Courts will not assess impacts on Treaty or Aboriginal rights in absolute terms, but will do so in relation to the specific reality of the Aboriginal rights holders.

Note that impacts are only considered an "infringement" of Treaty or Aboriginal rights when the given action or decision leaves the Aboriginal rights holders with "no meaningful right to hunt, fish or trap in relation to the territories over which they traditionally hunted, fished, and trapped." The courts have not provided any detail on what it means to have no meaningful right. Given the extent of the impact to First Nations’ treaty and aboriginal rights in the Alberta oilsands region, it appears that impacts to the meaningful exercise of rights can be very severe before being considered an infringement. However, considering Canada's colonial history and persistent bias in support of resource extraction industries, it is worth recognizing that many things happen on the ground that are not in fact sanctioned by law. A good example of this is the struggle of the Lubicon Cree. Canada simply ignored UN resolutions calling for a moratorium on tar sands development until their land claims could be addressed. (see lubicon.ca). Lameman vs Alberta established that governments could be held liable for cumulative effects of development. The Beaver Lake Cree are currently suing the government of Canada to stop tar sands development. (raventrust.com/tarsandstrial)

Other important factors to consider when determining the scope of the duty to consult and accommodate include the strength of the claim, the risk of non-compensable damage or infringement, the specificity of the promises made, the history of dealings between the Crown and the Aboriginal rights holders, competing interests, and whether the Crown will have control over future amendments to the project.

== Critiques of the duty to consult ==
=== Systemic Issues ===
Broadly speaking, the implementation of the duty to consult has been problematic in terms of its place in Canada's legal framework. The Supreme Court of Canada has relied on administrative law principles in making the duty fit into the Canadian public law framework. Commentators have noted that these legal rules and frameworks have limited potential to promote a more fundamental restricting of legal, political, and economic relationships which are arguably required by the objective of reconciliation. Rather, the decisions of the Supreme Court have established that the duty has a constitutional character, but is not a constitutional right in the sense normally understood. Principally, one may point to the fact that while there is a duty to consult, there is no corresponding right to be consulted on the part of Aboriginal peoples, and the fact that the courts have articulated the issue as a constitutional process rather than a principle of law.

=== Delegation ===
The duty can be delegated to lower administrative bodies and jurisdictions, or even to industry participants which in fact make up the bulk of delegation recipients. This may include municipal governments. Delegation is useful in making the administration of various projects and the duty itself practicable. However, it comes with significant costs. Given that the duty is envisioned as a nation-to-nation discourse meant to effect reconciliation, the delegation of the duty to lower representatives of the government, or representatives of industry, is problematic and would appear to undermine this goal.

Critics allege that the quality of the duty is lessened by delegation. The delegated duty is constricted because the lower administrative bodies are limited in their duties and powers as they are conferred by the legislature. This potentially reduces the scope and range of accommodations that can be made. While the British Columbia Court of Appeal has found that government entities are not limited by their statutory mandate in fulfilling the duty, because the duty lies "upstream" of the mandate of administrative decision makers, it is not clear that all parties necessarily understand this. Furthermore, as noted by the Supreme Court, wherever the administrative system has been structured such that no one administrative tribunal or body can properly fulfill the duty of consult, then the Aboriginal peoples affected are left to pursue the matter before the courts. Where an Aboriginal community is limited in its resources to bring a claim before the courts, the duty goes unfulfilled for a failure of administrative architecture. Some cases have found that crafting an administrative structure such that a duty to consult is compromised is itself a violation of the duty to consult.

Delegation may also simply result in confusion as to who carries the obligation to consult. This confusion can leave the duty unfulfilled or inadequately exercised. The potential for delegation to industry proponents also means that in some circumstances it is unclear whether consultation has even occurred, given the varying nature of negotiations between Aboriginal communities and industry proponents.

Recent court decisions have also failed to properly implement the duty where delegation was at issue. In such cases the courts conflated who owed the duty to consult with the question of whether consultation was necessary at all, resulting in projects going forward without consultation where it was a condition precedent to the project being approved.

=== Funding ===
Participation in the duty to consult requires various resources and expenditures. These include the sending of notices, research on the contemplated activity and its impact, and other costs. Usually, it is the Aboriginal community that lacks resources to cover these expenditures. There is no obligation on the Crown to provide financial assistance. Though funding aid exists in some provinces and in certain other limited circumstances, there is no guarantee that groups in need of funding will receive it. The courts have, on a few occasions, acknowledged very limited circumstances where economic accommodation was necessary, and in other circumstances the courts have recognized the unfairness resulting from the resource imbalances.

The issue is exacerbated by the Crown Referral Process, the process by which consultation is solicited when it is required pursuant to a Crown project. Once a planning decision is made in a Crown department to propose a project or make a decision that may impact Aboriginal or treaty rights, the Crown sends a referral package or letters to those communities it thinks will be affected which describe the proposed project or decision, and describes the intended use of land lying within Aboriginal territory. The recipient has a prescribed time in which to respond. Failure to respond allows the Crown to proceed on its own initiative, while a response engages the consultation process. The issue is that this process can bury Aboriginal groups in letters from the potentially numerous, unrelated government departments involved in the project. Creating complete and careful responses to each package would be time-consuming and require more resources than most bands can spare.

It should also be noted that expenditures on the consultation process are costs diverted away from other potentially pressing needs in Aboriginal communities, such as housing.

=== Historical and Cumulative Impacts ===
Cumulative effects refers to the gradual erosion of rights that are tied to or exercised on land. This is not to be confused with the erosion of the land and environment itself, though these are also concerns.

Since Aboriginal bands lack any veto power in the consultation process, multiple projects in the same area may, over time, erode rights to such a point that they are meaningless. Effectively, more consultations means more development which potentially means a reduced land base on which First Nations are able to exercise traditional practices. The issue is further exacerbated by other factors. Other parties have no obligation to reach an agreement with the First Nation being consulted, only that the community be meaningfully consulted. Hard bargaining is allowed by the Crown, an issue exacerbated by the resource disparity between the parties. First Nations are under an obligation not to frustrate the Crowns reasonable good faith attempts, nor to take unreasonable positions to thwart the government from making decisions where an agreement is not reached.

It is unclear whether the scope of the duty to consult allows it to address the impact of only the most recent Crown conduct, or if past impacts may be addressed through accommodations. As an example noted by Promislow, in Upper Nicola Indian Band v British Columbia (Minister of Environment), the BC Supreme Court held that, where the government contemplated construction of an electrical transmission line parallel to an older one, the impacts of the older line, constructed in the 1960s, were out of the scope of the duty in the current consultation process. By contrast, in West Moberly First Nations v British Columbia (Chief Inspector of Mines) the BC Court of Appeal directed that licenses for expanded exploration activities be remitted to the parties for further consultation, with direction that the historical impact of exploration was within the scope of those consultations. These historical impacts were seen as essential in understanding the impacts of the present licensing decision. However, the decision did not extend to accommodation measures.

=== Remedies ===
At present no award for damages is possible as a remedy for past or current breaches of the duty. This is problematic, especially given that past breaches cannot be contemplated in current consultation processes. The only remedy available to an Aboriginal community which brings a case forward for a failure to consult is an order for the party found in breach to undertake to consult with the Aboriginal community going forward.

== See also ==
- Canadian Aboriginal law
- Aboriginal peoples in Canada
- The Canadian Crown and Aboriginal peoples
- Numbered Treaties
- First Nations
- List of First Nations governments
- Inuit
- Métis
