= R v Gladstone =

- Supreme Court of Canada

Hearing: November 27–29, 1995 Judgment: August 21, 1996
- Full case name: Donald Gladstone and William Gladstone v Her Majesty The Queen
- Citations: [1996] 2 S.C.R. 723
- Ruling: Gladstone appeal allowed

Court membership
- Chief Justice: Antonio Lamer; Puisne Justices: Gérard La Forest, Claire L'Heureux-Dubé, John Sopinka, Charles Gonthier, Peter Cory, Beverley McLachlin, Frank Iacobucci, John C. Major

Reasons given
- Majority: Lamer C.J., joined by Sopinka, Gonthier, Cory, Iacobucci and Major JJ.
- Concurrence: L’Heureux‑Dubé J.
- Concurrence: McLachlin J.
- Dissent: La Forest J.

Laws applied
- R v Van der Peet, [1996] 2 S.C.R. 507

R v Gladstone, [1996] 2 S.C.R. 723 is a leading Supreme Court of Canada decision on non-treaty Aboriginal rights under section 35 of the Constitution Act, 1982. The Court modified the Sparrow test for the extinguishment of Aboriginal rights to give more deference to the government in protecting commercial fishing rights.

== Background ==
William and Donald Gladstone were members of the Heiltsuk Band in British Columbia. They were both charged with selling herring spawn contrary to the federal Fisheries Act. In their defence, the brothers claimed that they had a right to sell herrings under section 35 of the Constitution Act, 1982. At trial, they presented evidence showing that trade of herring spawn was a significant part of the Heiltsuk band's way of life prior to contact. The Court found that the Heiltsuk have a pre-existing right to harvest Herring (eggs) and that there is a commercial component to this right.

== Opinion of the Court ==
Chief Justice Lamer, for the majority, found that there was an aboriginal right to sell herring spawn under the Van der Peet test. In analyzing the rights infringement, he rejected prioritizing limited natural resources as described in R v Sparrow. Instead, he suggested that in the regulation of commercial fishing the regard should be given to regional fairness among all people when distributing fishing resources.

== See also ==
- List of Supreme Court of Canada cases (Lamer Court)
- The Canadian Crown and First Nations, Inuit and Métis
- Canadian Aboriginal case law
- Numbered Treaties
- Indian Act
- Section Thirty-five of the Constitution Act, 1982
- Indian Health Transfer Policy (Canada)
- Heiltsuk
- Heiltsuk Nation
