= Indigenous self-government in Canada =

Indigenous self-government proposals

Indigenous or Aboriginal self-government refers to proposals to give governments representing the Indigenous peoples in Canada greater powers of government. These proposals range from giving Aboriginal governments powers similar to that of local governments in Canada to demands that Indigenous governments be recognized as sovereign, and capable of "nation-to-nation" negotiations as legal equals to the Crown (i.e. the Canadian state), as well as many other variations.

== Background ==
Aboriginal peoples in Canada are defined in the Constitution Act, 1982 as Indians, Inuit and Métis. Prior to the acquisition of the land by European empires or the Canadian state after 1867, First Nations (Indian), Inuit, and Métis peoples had a wide variety of polities within their countries, from band societies, to tribal chiefdoms, multinational confederacies, to representative democracies (in the case of the Métis-led Legislative Assembly of Assiniboia). These were ignored or suppressed by the Government of Canada (federal government). For the Métis and Inuit, self-government was replaced by integration into the Canadian polity: these people could vote in the standard municipal, provincial, and federal elections as citizens of Canada. For the First Nations, the Government of Canada created the band system under the Indian Act, which allowed First Nations people to vote in band elections but they could not vote in federal elections before 1960 unless they renounced their status as Registered Indians (a process referred to as enfranchisement). Band governments had very little authority, however; they exercised only whatever power was delegated to them by the Minister of Indian Affairs, and only had authority on the Indian reserves which represented a tiny proportion of their traditional territories.

== Rationale ==
Indigenous people may claim an "inherent right to self-government" either because it is seen as a natural right emanating from prior occupation of the land or because of a gift from or covenant with the Creator. In this case, Indigenous people do not seek to be "granted" self-government, but simply to have their pre-existing right recognized in law. As well, an argument for self-government can be made on the basis of the right of self-determination as understood in international law generally or as specifically enumerated in the United Nations' Declaration of the Rights of Indigenous Peoples (UNDRIP).

Self-government arose in the later twentieth century as a proposed solution to the constraints of the longstanding Indian Act, first passed in 1878. Instances of self-government began with a new round of treaty-making between the federal government of Canada and First Nations and Inuit groups, ans well as between individual provinces and First Nations and Inuit peoples, beginning with the landmark James Bay and Northern Quebec Agreement in 1975 between the province of Quebec and the Cree and Inuit.

When a self-government treaty is implemented many of the restrictions of the Indian Act are lifted, allowing Indigenous communities different freedoms and forms of community-based control that were previously regulated. Treaty provisions may include control over education, healthcare institutions, administration, land development for revenue, and decision-making authority.

== Evolution of government proposals ==
In 1969, the White Paper on Indian Policy proposed abolishing band governments and transferring the delivery of social programs on reserves to the provincial governments (as the provinces already run these services for non-Indigenous people). Opposition to this proposal helped to galvanize the creation of national political organizations among Aboriginal peoples, bringing the concept of Indigenous self-government to the national political consciousness for the first time.

The constitutional amendments of 1982 included Section 35 of the Constitution Act which recognized Aboriginal rights and treaty rights but did not define these. In 1983, the Special Committee of the House of Commons on Indian Self-Government, released its report (also called the Penner Report after committee chair Keith Penner). It recommended that the federal government recognize First Nations as a distinct order of government within the Canadian federation and begin to negotiate self-government agreements with Indian bands.

An attempt was made by Indigenous leaders to have the concept of Indigenous self-government enshrined via the 1987 Meech Lake package of constitutional amendments, but they failed to convince the premiers to include such provisions. This led to Aboriginal hostility to the agreement and saw Manitoban MLA Elijah Harper, a Registered Cree Indian, help to defeat the accord. The follow-up Charlottetown Accord (1992) included recognition of an inherent Aboriginal right of self-government, but this package also failed though not because of Aboriginal resistance: in fact self-government was unpopular with many non-Aboriginal voters and may have been a factor in its defeat in the national referendum which followed.

The Royal Commission on Aboriginal Peoples issued its final report in 1996, which recommended that Indigenous governments become recognized as the third order of government in Canada (alongside the federal government and the provinces) and that Indigenous peoples receive special representation in Parliament.

After this time, however, the emphasis shifted away from constitutional entrenchment towards negotiations with individual communities. The Conservative government announced its Community-Based Self-Government (CBSG) policy in 1986, to "enable negotiation of new Crown - Aboriginal relationships outside of the Indian Act" on a community-by-community basis.

In 1995 the Liberal government issued the Inherent Right of Self-Government Policy which recognized that self-government was an inherent right, but limited its implementation to a model which resembles delegation of authority from the Crown to the communities. It requires that individual bands or groups of bands sign modern treaties with the Government of Canada (and sometimes a provincial government) to be removed from the structures of the Indian Act.

== Self-government agreements ==
As of 2016, twenty-two comprehensive self-government agreements had been signed by the federal government. Of those, eighteen were part of a comprehensive land claim agreement or modern treaty. Those numbers included the Yale Final Agreement and the Sioux Valley Final Agreement which have been signed, but have not yet been brought into effect through legislation.

In addition to the comprehensive agreements with Indian bands mentioned above, the Nunavut Land Claims Agreement of 1993 with the Inuit of the eastern Arctic, pursued a different model of governance. A new federal territory, Nunavut was created in 1999 where the Inuit were the majority, separate from the North West Territories where more First Nations, Métis, and non-Aboriginal people lived. Nunavut is not reserved exclusively for the Inuit, and any Canadian can move there and vote in its elections. However the strong Inuit majority is reflected in the governance of the territory and Inuktitut and Inuinnaq are two of the territory's official languages (alongside English and French).

Another model is the Cree of northern Quebec. Since the passage of the Cree-Naskapi (of Quebec) Act in 1984, nine Cree communities are not subject to the Indian Act or the band system. Instead they are represented by the Grand Council of the Crees (Eeyou Istchee) or GCCEI and governed by the closely linked Cree Regional Authority. The GCCEI signed an agreement in 2012 with the province of Quebec that would abolish the municipalities in the region and merge them with the Cree Regional Authority in a new regional government called the Eeyou Istchee James Bay Territory. As of 2014 the GCCEI are in talks with the federal government on a Cree Nation Governance Agreement to refine the new structure's relationship to the federal authorities.

The Anishinabek Education Agreement is another self-governance model. It occurred in 2017 and was the first case of an agreement regarding Indigenous self-governance over education in Ontario. As of 2017, it was also the largest number of First Nations included in an education self- governance agreement in Canada. The suggested purpose of this agreement was to further “academic excellence” and to push outside the bounds of the Indian Act by developing authority over their community's education.

As of 2019, there have been twenty-five comprehensive self-government agreements signed by the federal government, involving forty-three Indigenous communities. There are a further 50 agreements being negotiated across Canada in 2019 as well.

== Moves towards self-government ==
Some bands, rejecting the idea that they must negotiate with the Government of Canada in order to exercise their right to self-government, have acted unilaterally. In January 2014, the Nipissing First Nation adopted what is believed to be the first constitution for a First Nation in Ontario. It is supposed to replace the Indian Act as the supreme law which regulates the governance of the First Nation, but has not been tested in court.

== Funding self-government ==
Funding for Indigenous self-governing communities is governed by a 'financial transfer agreement.' The agreement establishes a five-year joint financial understanding between the Federal government, Provincial/Territorial government, and Indigenous government. These agreements are grounded in Canada’s collaborative self-government fiscal policy, which tries to promote a respectful, co-operative partnership with Indigenous governments and communities.

== Laws and non-Indigenous rights on the land ==
Indigenous self-government treaties also establish which laws are under or shared between levels of governance (Federal, Provincial, or First Nations jurisdictions). A Government of Canada 2019 Indigenous Self-Government Report outlines, although specific laws may be split up differently depending on the Nation and the agreement, "the Canadian Charter of Rights and Freedoms, the Canadian Human Rights Act and other general laws such as the Criminal Code continue to apply."

Since the Charter of Rights and Freedoms applies to all peoples and governments in Canada, any person living on First Nations land, including non-Indigenous, can challenge First Nations Governance if they feel their rights are being infringed upon.

The Federal Government has also taken steps to include non-Indigenous individuals who live on First Nations land in the decision making process. Treaties may include provisions to ensure non-members of the community have a voice by means of voting, candidacy, or appealing decisions. The rationale for this is that all individuals must be able to have an input over “issues that affect them, such as service levels, taxation rates, and health”.

== See also ==
- Legal status of Hawaii
  - Hawaiian sovereignty movement
  - United States federal recognition of Native Hawaiians
- Ethnic separatism
- Indigenous rights
- Self-determination
  - Self-determination of Australian Aborigines
  - Native American self-determination
    - Tribal sovereignty
  - African-American self-determination
- National questions
