= Treaty rights =

Indigenous rights stipulated in treaties with settler societies

In Australia, Canada, New Zealand and the United States the term treaty rights specifically refers to rights for indigenous peoples enumerated in treaties with settler societies that arose from European colonization.

Exactly who is indigenous is understood differently across these countries, and not all indigenous groups have signed treaties. Therefore the concept of "treaty rights" operates very different in context. As of 2021 no such treaties exist in Australia, and the discussion of treaty rights there is speculative, based on future agreements that may be signed. For the other English-speaking settler countries, well-established legal regimes decide who is eligible for what legal protections based on treaties. Treaty rights of one kind or another apply to most Alaska Natives and Native Americans in the United States and many but not all First Nations in Canada. The concept of treaty rights also applies to a smaller number of Inuit and Metis in Canada, who have entered into treaties. By extension, a "treaty Indian" is a Canadian legal term for a person who has inherited such rights.

Treaty rights are not the only rights claimed by indigenous peoples. Indigenous people claim inherent rights to self-determination, which implies that they be recognized as rights-bearing groups (called "tribes", "bands", or "nations" - depending on place and time) capable of self-determination and cultural survival. In the British constitutional tradition operating in Australia, Canada, New Zealand and the United States, once the Crown or the government recognizes that there is another body corporate with legal personality capable of making binding agreements on behalf of its members, negotiations can begin for mutual exchange and aid, resulting in a treaty.

By signing treaties, indigenous peoples have traded claims over vast amounts of land and resources in exchange for (for example):

- reserved areas of land (Indian reservations [US terminology] and Indian reserves [Canadian terminology])
- protection (from attacks from other indigenous group or land-rushing settlers)
- health care (the "medicine chest clause" of Treaty Number Six between Canada and the Cree and Stoneys being a famous example)
- education
- religious freedom
- protection of hunting and fishing rights
- sometimes some monies as well ("treaty monies" distributed at "treaty day" ceremonies)

Critics of the treaty relationship commonly claim that a state may grant special rights to indigenous people because of their racial status. Defenders of the treaty system argue that governments do not give treaty rights to anyone but that native people reserved such rights when they signed treaties in an inter-governmental relationship.

== Historical background and legal theory ==
The early treaties between European colonial powers and the various indigenous peoples of the Americas were generally similar in manner to military alliances between peers. With the expansion of European settler colonialism in the Americas, treaties increasingly involved the cession of land from indigenous peoples for the purposes of colonial expansion.

In the Royal Proclamation of 1763, the British Crown forbade white settlers from settling past a defined boundary in North America and stipulated that all land purchases with indigenous peoples could be done only by agents of the Crown, which could then be redistributed to individuals. That principle, which was adopted by both Canada and the United States upon independence, and became the legal impetus for all subsequent treaties during the period of westward expansion. A similar system operated in New Zealand and resulted in the Treaty of Waitangi in 1840.

In Australia and British Columbia, by contrast, a different legal principal of terra nullius was invoked by white settlers to justify occupying land without consulting indigenous peoples living there.

In British India, the precedent of the Pratt–Yorke opinion on 1757 meant that India is one of the few common law jurisdiction that has rejected the doctrine of aboriginal title and so treaties did not needed to be signed before British companies could enter into land purchases in India. Therefore, indigenous treaties of the North American type do not exist in Burma, India, Pakistan, and Sri Lanka.

== Continuation to present ==
Because Article Six of the United States Constitution declares treaties to be the supreme law of the land, treaties are just as valid today as they were the day they were signed, and treaty rights are still legally binding as well. Likewise treaty rights were enshrined in Canada under section 35 by the package of constitutional reforms of 1982.

== United States ==
Between the years 1778 and 1868, there were 373 treaties between the United States government and various Native American groups, including peace settlements and land exchanges. Over the years, many of these treaties went to court and help define the term treaty rights. In more recent years, the United States Senate has attempted to clarify the rights granted to Native Americans living on reservations. The field remains complex.

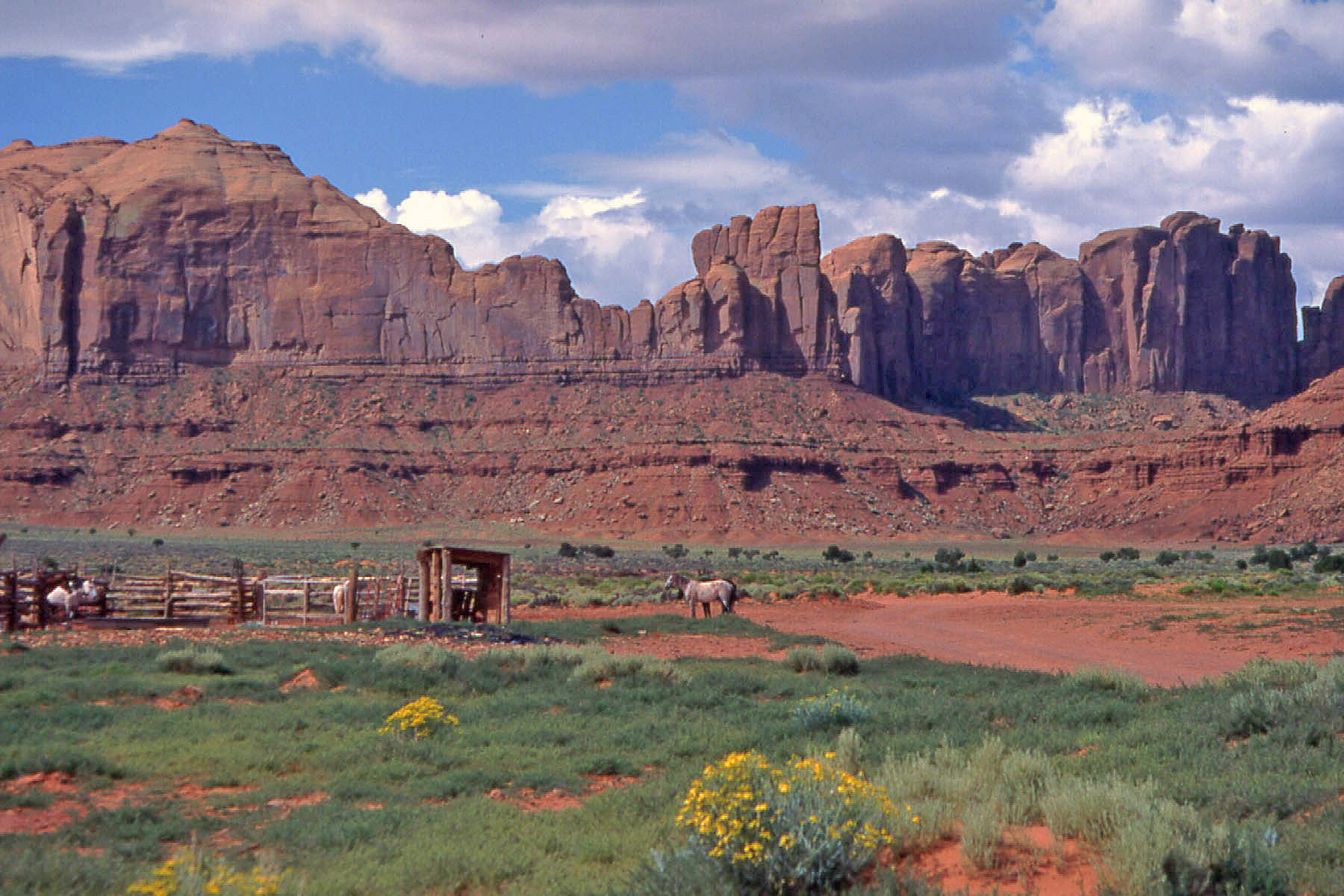
Navajo Reservation in Utah.

The central underpinning of treaty rights is that Native Americans are sovereign people living under their own laws, which exist alongside current United States law. It is the balance between these two systems of law that create issues and require frequent interpretation by the United States court system. One such case is the Crow Dog habeas corpus case.

=== Ex Parte Crow Dog ===
In this case, Crow Dog, a Native American, shot and killed another Native American on a reservation. The reservation police turned him over to the army, who tried him in Dakota Territorial Court. The court sentenced him to death for the murder. Crow Dog appealed the case up to the Supreme Court of the United States. He argued that because he committed the crime on a reservation, and his family had made amends for his crime in accordance with tribal law and custom, the United States had no right to try him. The Supreme Court ruled in favor of Crow Dog in 1883, stating that the district court could not impose a punishment on a Native American for a crime committed on a reservation against another Native American.

=== Williams v. Lee ===
As Native Americans became more integrated into American culture, more non-Native Americans began working and living on the reservations. This gave rise to the question of whether or not tribes had the legal authority over non-Native Americans who commit crimes on their land. In 1959, a case surrounding the rights of a tribe to regulate the civil activities within their reservation went to the Supreme Court. In Williams v. Lee, a non-Native American merchant, who owned a general store on a reservation, sued some of his Native American customers in Arizona State Courts. The Supreme Court ruled that the Arizona court system did not have legal authority over reservations. Stating that the tribes had legal jurisdiction over both criminal and civil cases. Including those between non-Native Americans and Native Americans on the reservation.

=== Oliphant v. Suquamish ===
The Supreme Court case Oliphant v. Suquamish attempted to settle this issue once and for all. This case centered around the question of if Native American law applied to non-Native Americans living on reservations. The Supreme Court ruled that non-Native Americans living on reservations were not subject to the rulings of the tribal courts.

== Canada ==
Treaties are used to establish the relationship between Indigenous peoples and the Canadian Government and define the rights Indigenous peoples are entitled to. Treaty rights within Canada are set out in either a historic or modern treaty agreement. These rights define specific rights, benefits and obligations which are recognized and affirmed by Section 35 of the Constitution Act, 1982.

These agreements were made between the Crown and Indigenous peoples where Indigenous nations agreed to share some of their ancestral lands in return for various payments and promises. These promises have been broken over the years and have subjected Indigenous peoples to poor living conditions in attempts of erasure.

Treaties are understood differently between the Canadian and Indigenous nations. For Indigenous peoples, the character of treaties is found in what was said at the time of negotiations. Contrary to this, the principles for treaty makings were to establish the constitutional foundations of Canada and what was said was not reflected in the treaties signed. Verbal commitments made to the Indigenous leaders not included in the written treaties became a common source of discontent and remains an ongoing issue of dispute and discussion. Following complaints from affected communities, many of these promises are not honored.

Canada only recognizes the 70 historic treaties signed between 1701 and 1923 and 25 modern treaties (also called comprehensive land claim agreements) since 1975. Together, these treaties have provided inconsistent protection to traditional ways of life, vague participation in land and resource management decisions, and Indigenous ownership to about 600,000 km^{2} out of the 9.985 million km^{2} of land that makes up Canada.

Historic treaties promised Indigenous peoples reserve land, the government paid schools and teachers on reserves, hunting and fishing rights on unoccupied Crown land, and one-time benefits (such as farm equipment and animals, ammunition, and clothing).

The most notable historic treaties include the Numbered Treaties 1-11. These were used as political tools to secure alliances and transfer land ownership. Differing interpretations of the treaties have led to disputes between the federal government and First Nation groups. The concept of territory and ownership differ amongst European and Indigenous world views, where Indigenous peoples interpreted the treaties as promises to share, rather than own, the land and natural resources with the colonizers. The long-lasting legal and socioeconomic impacts of the Numbered Treaties on First Nation peoples, such as the creation of reserves, schools and other instruments of assimilation, have affected Indigenous cultures, customs and traditional ways of life.

Presentation copies of several numbered treaties

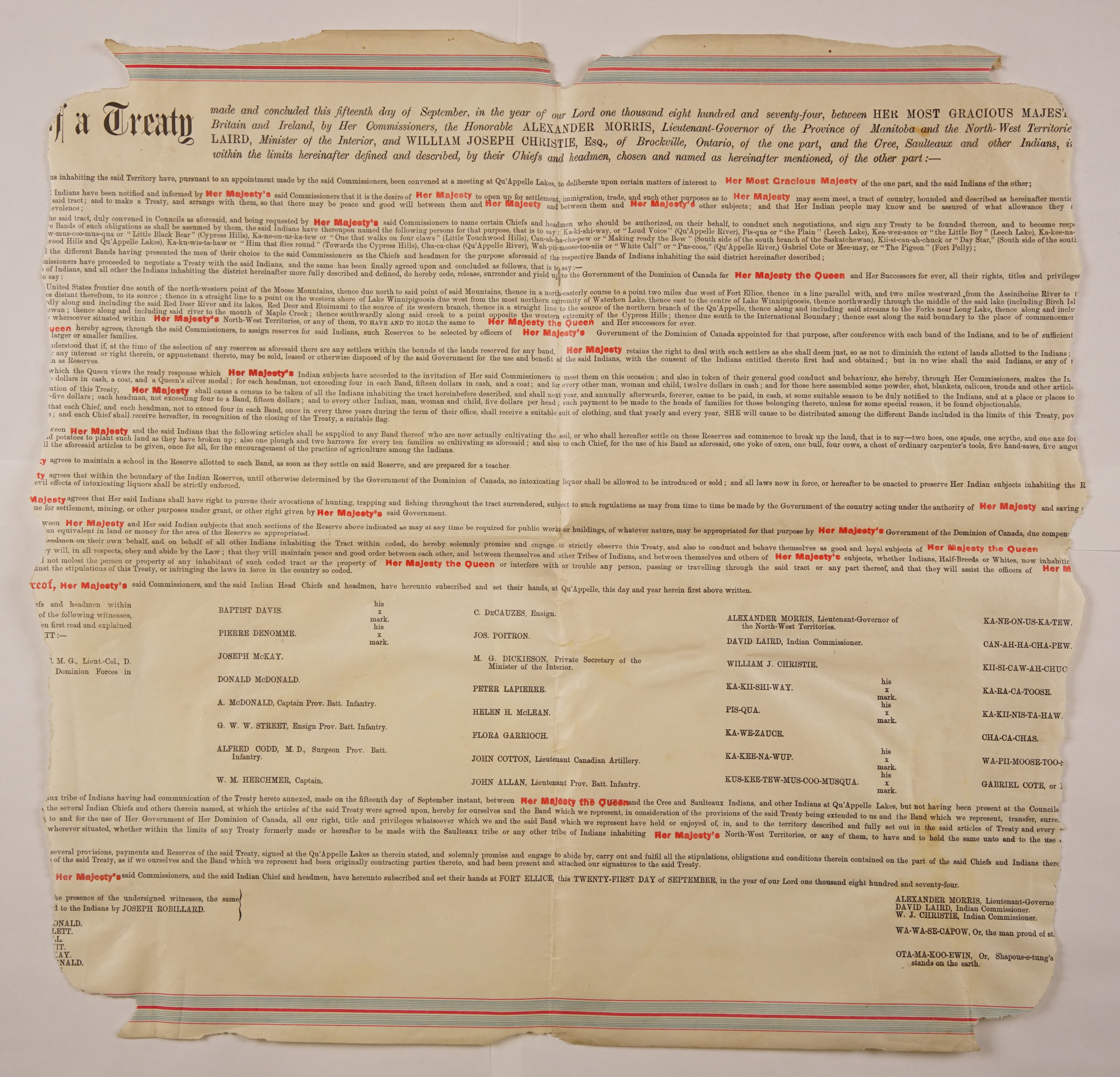
Treaty 4

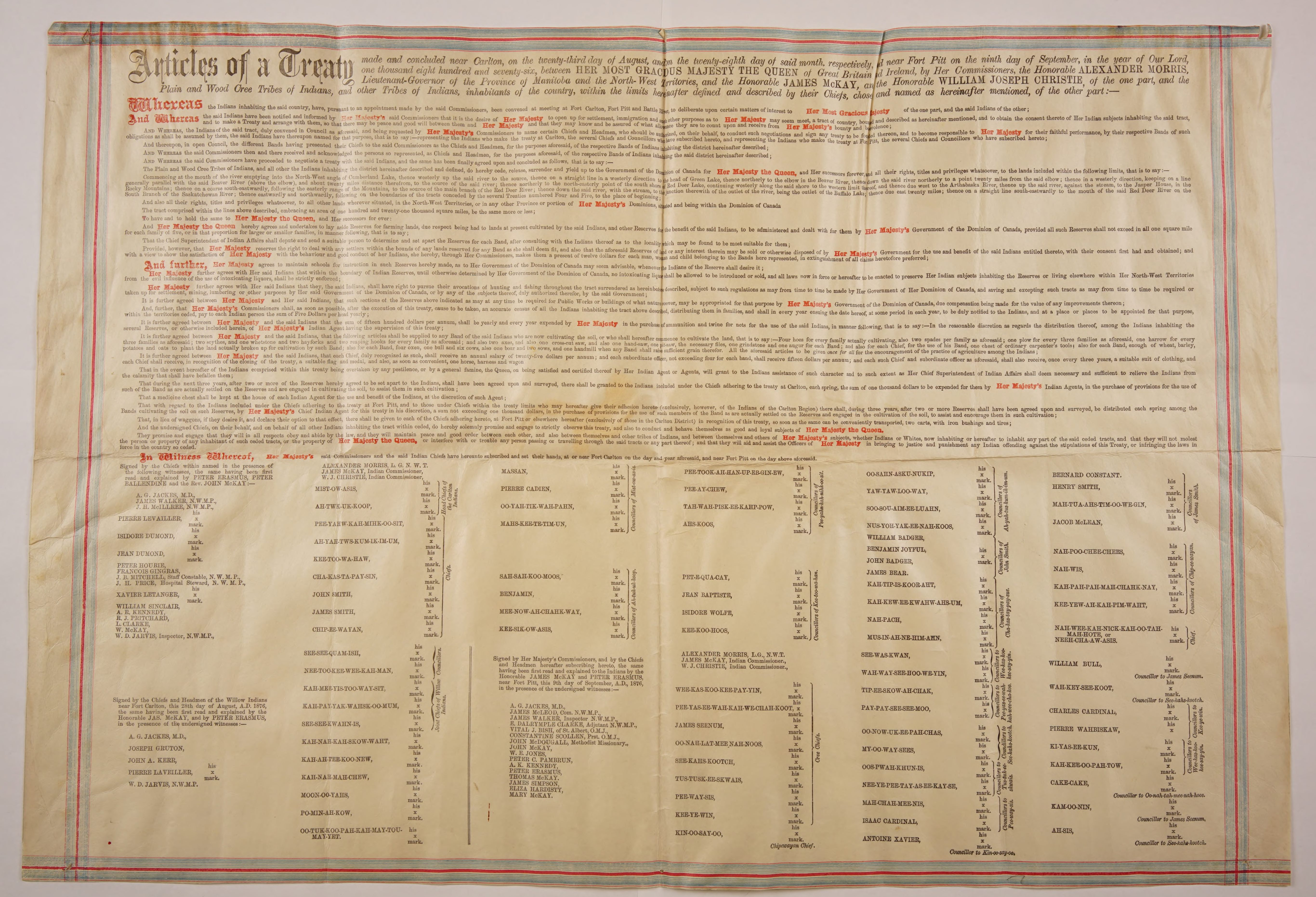
Treaty 6

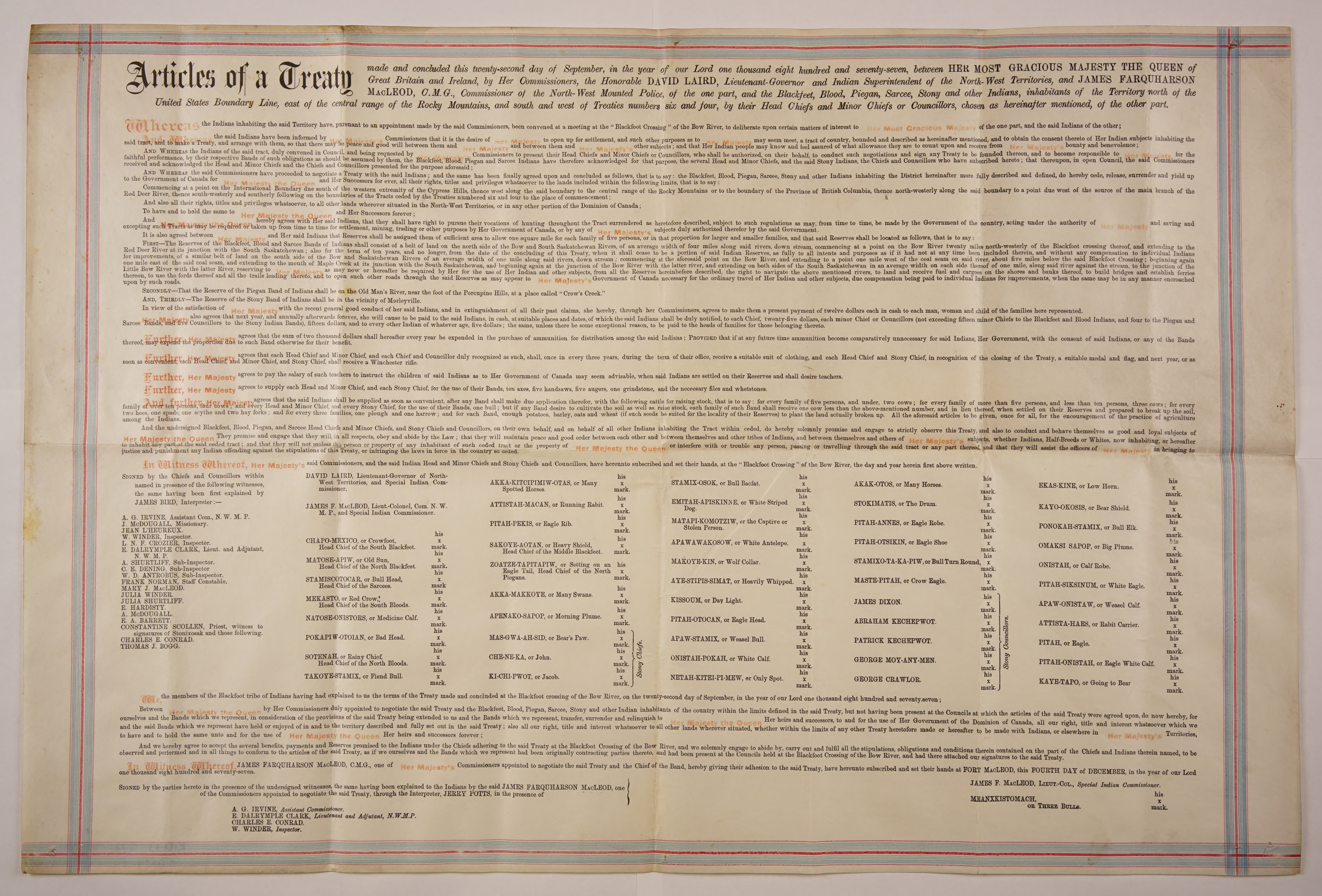
Treaty 7

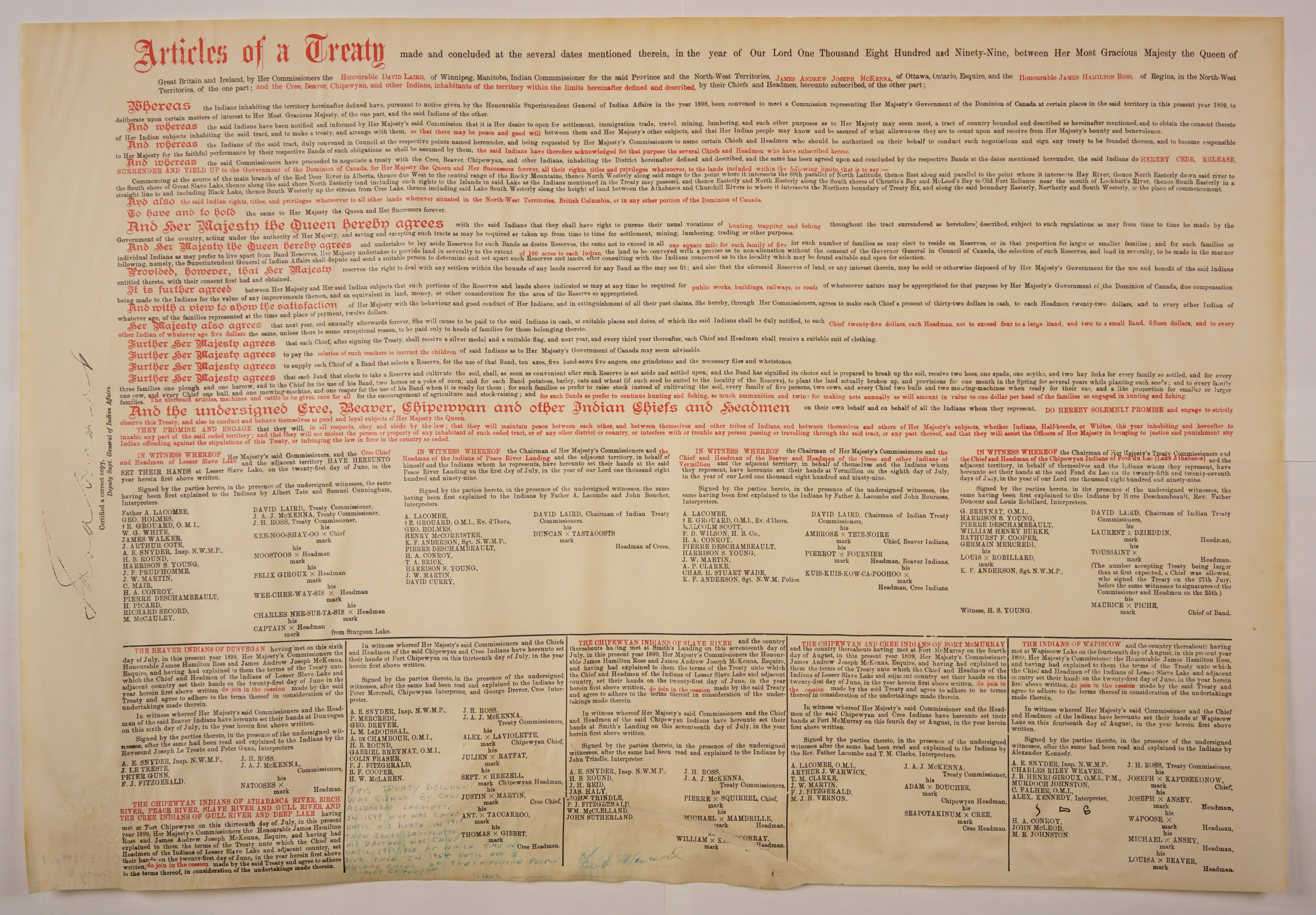
Treaty 8

These treaty presentation copies are held in the Bruce Peel Special Collections at University of Alberta Library. Each is printed on parchment with text in black and red and a blue and red border.

Contemporary treaties began in 1973 after the Supreme Court of Canada's decision which recognized Aboriginal rights for the first time. Aboriginal rights are the collective rights entitled to Indigenous peoples as the first inhabitants of Canada. These treaties addressed Indigenous rights to ownership of lands, wildlife harvesting rights, financial settlements, participation in land use and management in specific areas, and self-government.

=== Section 35 ===
Section 35 recognizes and affirms the treaty rights and Aboriginal rights of the Indigenous peoples in Canada. The Constitution does not define Indigenous rights under Section 35, but they can include Aboriginal titles, rights to occupy and use land resources, self-government rights, and cultural and social rights. Section 35 varies depending on the vast cultures, customs, practices, and traditions of each group.

=== Significant court cases ===
Some inherent Indigenous rights are not recognized by the Crown, as the Constitution does not define specifics. The Canadian government stipulated that these rights were to be defined in the courts on a case-by-case basis. There are several significant cases that recognized Indigenous rights in the Canadian court, such as R v. Sparrow, R. v. Van der Peet, and R. v. Powley.

==== R v Sparrow ====
R v Sparrow (1990) set out criteria ("the Sparrow test") to determine whether government infringement on Aboriginal rights was justifiable.

==== R v Van der Peet ====
R v Van der Peet (1996) was pivotal in further defining Aboriginal rights in Section 35. It established criteria that are used to determine whether an Aboriginal right is protected as an “existing” Aboriginal right under the Canadian Constitution.

==== R v Powley ====
R v Powley (2003) was the first major Aboriginal rights case concerning Métis peoples. It created “the Powley Test", which addressed the criteria that defines Métis rights, and who is legally entitled to those rights.

== Violations ==
Many Native nations have reserved rights to hunt and fish in their accustomed places, which are often lands that were given up at the treaty signing, or "ceded land". This leads to conflict with sports and commercial hunters and fishers, who are competing for the same limited resource in the same place. Things like dams and logging have huge effects on fish and wildlife populations. In Canadian law, the government has a court-mandated "duty to consult" indigenous peoples regarding the management process of these lands and rivers. In the United States, no such mandate exists.

=== Spearfishing in Northern Wisconsin ===
Beginning in the 1980s and extending into the early 1990s, Northern Wisconsin was rife in protests against Ojibwe spearfishing. The Voigt decision in 1983 had reaffirmed that the treaties made in 1837 and 1842 still stood. These treaties gave the Ojibwe the rights to hunt, fish, and gather off-reservation, which was not subject to state regulation. This heralded a backlash of non-Natives, who believed the Ojibwe had been granted special rights. Spearheaded by groups like Stop Treaty Abuse (STA), often violent and racially discriminatory protests against spearfishing covered boat landings across northern Wisconsin. This led to the case Lac du Flambeau Band of Lake Superior Chippewa Indians v. Stop Treaty Abuse-Wisconsin. This case culminated with Judge Barbara Crabb upholding the Voigt decision and many members, donors, and politicians distancing themselves from the STA, which many believed was racist.

=== Whaling in Washington ===
The right to hunt North Pacific gray whales has been a contentious issue for the Makah people in Washington state. The Makah people ceded much of their traditional lands in the Treaty of Neah Bay in 1855 but retained the right to whale. The tribe voluntarily gave up this practice in 1915 because of decimated gray whale populations, but once the species was taken off the Federal Endangered Species List in 1993, the tribe sought to continue whaling. In 1999, they killed one whale but faced immediate backlash from environmental groups and animal rights groups. The International Whaling Commission (IWC) believed that the Makah tribe's quota of harvesting up to five whales a year would not hurt the recovering population. Because of a number of new studies garnishing evidence for and against this practice, the issue has been tied up in court since 1999, with the tribe being unable to exercise the right given to them in the Treaty of Neah Bay.

=== Annexation of Hawaii ===
Throughout the 19th century, the United States made several treaties with the then Kingdom of Hawaii, the last being in 1887. These treaties recognized the Kingdom of Hawaii as being sovereign and independent. In 1893, John L. Stevens, US minister assigned to the Kingdom of Hawaii, led a group of non-indigenous people to overthrow Queen Lili‘uokalani, which was backed by the United States naval forces. They established a Provisional government, which then declared itself the Republic of Hawaii. In 1899, the US annexed Hawaii. Many Hawaiian sovereignty activists feel that because of the treaties mentioned above, Hawaii should today be its own Nation instead of part of the United States.

=== Dakota Access Pipeline ===
The Lakota people of Standing Rock reservation in North and South Dakota believe that the Dakota Access Pipeline (DAPL), which runs near their main source of water, could contaminate that source of water should it leak. They also cite the Fort Laramie Treaties of 1851 and 1868, which promised the land that DAPL runs through to the Lakota's land. Lands were seized in 1877 and 1887 with the Dawes Allotment Act that broke up reservations. Some call for these treaties to be reinstated and enforced today, which would put the course of the DAPL straight through Lakota lands.
