= R v Van der Peet =

- Supreme Court of Canada

Hearing: November 27, 28, 29, 1995 Judgment: August 21, 1996
- Full case name: Dorothy Marie Van der Peet v Her Majesty The Queen
- Citations: [1996] 2 S.C.R. 507
- Docket No.: 23803
- Ruling: Van der Peet appeal dismissed

Court membership
- Chief Justice: Antonio Lamer; Puisne Justices: Gérard La Forest, Claire L'Heureux-Dubé, John Sopinka, Charles Gonthier, Peter Cory, Beverley McLachlin, Frank Iacobucci, John C. Major

Reasons given
- Majority: Lamer C.J., joined by La Forest, Sopinka, Gonthier, Cory, Iacobucci and Major JJ.
- Dissent: L'Heureux-Dubé J.
- Dissent: McLachlin J.

Laws applied
- R. v. Sparrow, [1990] 1 S.C.R. 1075

R v Van der Peet, [1996] 2 S.C.R. 507 is a leading case on Aboriginal rights under section 35 of the Constitution Act, 1982. The Supreme Court held that Aboriginal fishing rights did not extend to commercial selling of fish. From this case came the Van der Peet Test for determining if an Aboriginal right exists. This is the first of three cases known as the Van der Peet trilogy which included R v NTC Smokehouse Ltd and R v Gladstone.

On September 11, 1987, Steven and Charles Jimmy caught sockeye salmon near Chilliwack. The men were both holders of valid native food fish licenses, so the fish were legally caught, but they were forbidden from selling the fish. Charles Jimmy brought the fish to his common-law partner, Dorothy Van der Peet, a member of the Stó:lō Nation, and she cleaned the fish and set them on ice. Van der Peet was visited by Marie Lugsdin, a non-Indigenous person, who offered to purchase ten fish at $5 a piece, for a total of $50. Van der Peet agreed and was later charged, under British Columbia Fishery Regulations, with having unlawfully sold fish caught under a food (only) fish license.

At trial, the judge held that the Aboriginal right to fish for food and ceremonial purposes did not extend to the right to sell fish commercially. A summary appeal judge overturned the verdict, but it was subsequently overturned at the British Columbia Court of Appeal.

The issue before the Court was whether the law preventing sale of the fish infringed Van der Peet's Aboriginal rights under section 35.

== Opinion of the Court ==
In a 7–2 decision, the Court upheld the Court of Appeal's decision. In order to be an Aboriginal right an activity must be an element of a practice, custom or tradition integral to the distinctive culture of the Aboriginal group asserting the right." The exchange of fish for money or other goods did not constitute a practice, custom or tradition that was integral to Sto:lo culture.

The Court developed an "Integral to a Distinctive Culture Test" to determine how to define an Aboriginal right as protected by s.35(1) of the Constitution Act, 1982. The Test has ten main parts:

1. Courts must take into account the perspective of Aboriginal peoples themselves
2. Courts must identify precisely the nature of the claim being made in determining whether an Aboriginal claimant has demonstrated the existence of an Aboriginal right
3. In order to be integral a practice, custom or tradition must be of central significance to the Aboriginal society in question
4. The practices, customs and traditions which constitute Aboriginal rights are those which have continuity with the practices, customs and traditions that existed prior to contact
5. Courts must approach the rules of evidence in light of the evidentiary difficulties inherent in adjudicating Aboriginal claims
6. Claims to Aboriginal rights must be adjudicated on a specific rather than general basis
7. For a practice, custom or tradition to constitute an Aboriginal right it must be of independent significance to the Aboriginal culture in which it exists
8. The integral to a distinctive culture test requires that a practice, custom or tradition be distinctive; it does not require that that practice, custom or tradition be distinct
9. The influence of European culture will only be relevant to the inquiry if it is demonstrated that the practice, custom or tradition is only integral because of that influence.
10. Courts must take into account both the relationship of Aboriginal peoples to the land and the distinctive societies and cultures of Aboriginal peoples

== Criticism ==
Canadian Aboriginal Law scholar John Borrows writes:

"With this test, as promised, Chief Justice Antonio Lamer has now told us what Aboriginal means. Aboriginal is retrospective. It is about what was, 'once upon a time,' central to the survival of a community, not necessarily about what is central, significant, and distinctive to the survival of these communities today. His test has the potential to reinforce troubling stereotypes about Indians."

== See also ==
- The Canadian Crown and Aboriginal peoples
- Numbered Treaties
- Indian Act
- Section Thirty-five of the Constitution Act, 1982
- Indian Health Transfer Policy (Canada)
