= Section 35 of the Constitution Act, 1982 =

Section of the Constitution Act, 1982 of Canada

Section 35 of the Constitution Act, 1982 provides constitutional protection to the indigenous and treaty rights of indigenous peoples in Canada. The section, while within the Constitution of Canada, falls outside the Canadian Charter of Rights and Freedoms. The section does not define the term "aboriginal rights" or provide a closed list; some examples of the rights that section 35 has been found to protect are fishing, logging, hunting, the right to land (cf. aboriginal title) and the right to enforcement of treaties. There remains a debate over whether the right to indigenous self-government is included within section 35. As of 2006 the Supreme Court of Canada has made no ruling on the matter. However, since 1995 the Government of Canada has had a policy recognizing the inherent right of self-government under section 35.

== Text ==
The provision provides that:

35. (1) The existing aboriginal and treaty rights of the aboriginal peoples of Canada are hereby recognized and affirmed.

(2) In this Act, "aboriginal peoples of Canada" includes the Indian, Inuit and Métis peoples of Canada.

(3) For greater certainty, in subsection (1) "treaty rights" includes rights that now exist by way of land claims agreements or may be so acquired.

(4) Notwithstanding any other provision of this Act, the aboriginal and treaty rights referred to in subsection (1) are guaranteed equally to male and female persons.

== Aboriginal rights ==
In 1982, when section 35 was entrenched into the Canadian Constitution, Delbert Riley — who was then the National Leader of the National Indian Brotherhood (later known as Assembly of First Nations (AFN)) — was quoted as saying that "Aboriginal Rights are what First Nations define them as. Their rights are what they were before European contact, and remain the same after European contact".

Section 35 was enacted in 1982 and then amended following the 1983 constitutional conference to add protections for modern land claims agreements and to guarantee Aboriginal and treaty rights equally to male and female persons.

The word "existing" in section 35(1) has created the need for the Supreme Court of Canada to define what Aboriginal rights "exist". The Supreme Court ruled in R. v. Sparrow that, before 1982 (when section 35 came into effect), Aboriginal rights existed by virtue of the common law. Common law could be changed by legislation. Therefore, before 1982, the Parliament of Canada could extinguish Aboriginal rights, whereas now it can no longer extinguish any rights that still existed in 1982. Extinguishment of rights can only occur through an act that showed "clear and plain intention" on the government to deny those rights.

In Sparrow, the Court also held the words "recognized and affirmed" incorporate the government's fiduciary duty to the Aboriginal peoples which requires them to exercise restraint when applying their powers in interference with Aboriginal rights. This further suggests that Aboriginal rights are not absolute and can be encroached upon given sufficient reason. After the Sparrow case, provincial legislation can only limit Aboriginal rights if it has given them appropriate priority.

However, in the Sparrow case, the court did not have to address what was in fact an Aboriginal right for the purposes of s.35(1), since neither side disputed that the Musqueam had an Aboriginal right to fish for food. This was developed in R. v. Van der Peet where Chief Justice Lamer's majority decided that to be considered an Aboriginal right, a practice must have been integral to the distinctive nature of the culture prior to contact by Europeans.

== Honour of the Crown ==
As part of the historical relationship between them, any time the government is interacting with Aboriginal people the honour of the crown is said to be at stake. This principle of the "honour of the crown" imposes a number of duties upon the government.

Flowing from the honour principle is a duty on the Crown to consult with Aboriginals in any industry activities. This duty was first described in the decisions of Haida Nation v. British Columbia (Minister of Forests) and Taku River Tlingit First Nation v. British Columbia. The duty is engaged when "the Province has knowledge, real or constructive, of the potential existence of Aboriginal right or title and contemplates conduct that might adversely affect them." The determination of such a duty depends both on the strength of the right that is being encroached upon as well as the negative impact and gravity of the government's conduct.

== Not a Charter right ==
The section in the Charter that most directly relates to Aboriginal people is section 25. It merely states that Charter rights do not diminish Aboriginal rights; it is therefore not as important as section 35. The Charter forms Part I of the Constitution Act, 1982 while section 35 is placed in Part II. This placement in the Constitution is considered significant. Professor Kent McNeil has written it could be seen as meaning section 35 allows for Aboriginal self-government, while the Charter is concerned with more individual rights. Professor Peter Hogg has argued there are negative and positive effects of excluding section 35 from the Charter. Section 35 cannot be limited by section 1 or the notwithstanding clause. However, section 24 of the Charter, which allows remedies for rights violations, is not available to section 35. Moreover, in R. v. Sparrow the Court developed a test to limit section 35 that Hogg has compared to the section 1 Oakes test.

Despite this, professors Ted Morton and Rainer Knopff, in their criticisms of Charter case law and growing judicial discretion, treat section 35 as if it were part of the Charter. They write that "Section 35 is technically 'outside' of the Charter, but as a declaration of the special rights of Canada's most salient racial minority- rights that are enforceable in the courts- it has become an important part of the Charter revolution."

== See also ==
- Amendments to the Constitution of Canada
- Canadian Aboriginal law
- Canadian Charter of Rights and Freedoms
- Indian Act
- Indian Health Transfer Policy (Canada)
- Numbered Treaties
- The Canadian Crown and Aboriginal peoples
- Unsuccessful attempts to amend the Canadian Constitution
- Canadian sovereignty
