= Numbered Treaties =

1871–1921 treaties between Canada's government and First Nations

- Map of Numbered Treaties of Canada. Borders are approximated.
- Context: Treaties to transfer large tracts of land from the First Nations to the Crown in return for different promises laid out in the treaty
- Signed: 1871–1921
- Signatories: Key representatives of the Canadian Crown: Adams George Archibald, Alexander Morris, David Laird, Duncan Campbell Scott, Wemyss Mackenzie Simpson, S. J. Dawson, William J. Christie, James McKay, James Macleod, James Hamilton Ross, J. A. J. McKenna, Samuel Stewart, Daniel G. MacMartin, Henry Anthony Conroy, Key representatives of First Nations groups: Crowfoot (Blackfoot Confederacy), Big Bear (Cree Nation), Chief Powassin (Ojibwe Nation), Chief Keenooshayoo (Athabasca First Nations)
- Languages: English

The Numbered Treaties (or Post-Confederation Treaties) are a series of eleven treaties signed between the First Nations, one of three groups of Indigenous peoples in Canada, and the reigning monarch of Canada (Victoria, Edward VII or George V) from 1871 to 1921. These agreements were created to allow the Government of Canada to pursue settlement and resource extraction in the affected regions, which includes the entirety of modern-day Alberta, Manitoba, and Saskatchewan, as well as parts of modern-day British Columbia, Ontario, the Northwest Territories, Nunavut, and Yukon. These treaties acquired large tracts of land for settlers in exchange for promises made to the indigenous people of the area. These terms were dependent on individual negotiations and so specific terms differed with each treaty. The expansion of settler lands resulted in a large-scale displacement of Indigenous populations.

These treaties came in two waves—Numbers 1 through 7 from 1871 to 1877 and Numbers 8 through 11 from 1899 to 1921. In the first wave, the treaties were key in advancing European settlement across the Prairie regions as well as the development of the Canadian Pacific Railway. In the second wave, resource extraction was the main motive for government officials. During this time, Canada introduced the Indian Act extending its control over the First Nations to education, government and legal rights. The federal government did provide emergency relief, on condition of the Indigenous peoples moving to the Indian reserves.

Today, these agreements are upheld by the Government of Canada, administered by Canadian Aboriginal law and overseen by the Minister of Crown–Indigenous Relations. They are often criticized and are a leading issue within the fight for First Nation rights. The Constitution Act, 1982 gave protection of First Nations and treaty rights under Section 35. It states: "Aboriginal and treaty rights are hereby recognized and affirmed." This phrase was never fully defined. As a result, First Nations must attest their rights in court as the case in R v Sparrow.

== Background ==
The relationship between the Canadian Crown and Indigenous peoples stretches back to the first contact between European colonialists and North American Indigenous peoples. Over centuries of interaction, treaties were established concerning the interaction between the monarch and Indigenous peoples. Both the Royal Proclamation of 1763 and the British North America Act 1867 (now the Constitution Act, 1867) established guidelines that would be later used to create the numbered treaties.

The royal proclamation of 1763 is considered to be the foundation of treaty-making in Canada. This proclamation established a line between the Appalachian Mountains from Nova Scotia to the southern region of the Province of Georgia, and prevented settlement beyond that specific area by settlers. The proclamation also established protocols that needed to be acknowledged by the governing authority in regards to purchasing land from First Nations Peoples in North America and later Canada. The royal proclamation was created as a result of the assertion of British jurisdiction over First Nation territory. While the British laid claim over First Nation territory, uprisings from Pontiac, the Three Fires Confederacy, and other First Nations Peoples resulted in a period of violence between the two peoples as the British attempted to maintain their claim and the Indigenous peoples fought to dislodge British troops from their land. As a result of these uprisings, the intention of the royal proclamation was to prevent future disputes. The royal proclamation stated that the only authoritative government that was able to purchase land from First Nations People was the British Crown. One of the stipulations of this agreement was that First Nations People were to be informed and attend the public assembly regarding the purchase of lands.

When the British North America Act 1867 was enacted, a division of power was established between the Dominion government and its provinces that separated First Nation Peoples and settlers. The federal government retained responsibility for providing health care, education, property rights and creating other laws that would affect the First Nations people. The government of Canada replaced the British Crown as the leading authority, and gained control of 19th-century First Nations land transfers.

Both the royal proclamation and the British North America Act 1867 impacted the procedures of governmental and First Nations negotiations. They set the stage for future negotiations that would occur, including the numbered treaties that would begin in 1871 with Treaty 1.

== Negotiation ==
Negotiation of the Numbered Treaties began in 1871. The first seven affected those living on the prairies, while the remaining were negotiated at a later time between 1899 and 1921 and concerned those living further north. Each treaty delineates a tract of land which was thought to be the traditional territory of the First Nations signing that particular treaty. For Canada it was a necessary step before settlement and development could occur further westward. No two treaties were alike, as they were dependent upon specific geographic and social conditions within the territory being addressed.

=== Government ===
After confederation, Canada looked to expand its borders from sea to sea. There was a fear among the population that rapid expansion from the United States would leave the country cornered with limited arable land, lack of opportunity for economic growth, and resource extraction. To the west of Ontario was Rupert's Land, fur trading territory operated by the Hudson's Bay Company since 1670, which contained several trading posts and some small settlements, such as the Red River Colony. During the first session of Parliament many called for the annexation of the territory, and letters were sent to the Queen suggesting that "it would promote the prosperity of the Canadian people, and conduce to the advantage of the whole Empire if the Dominion of Canada ... were extended westward to the shore of the Pacific Ocean". In the following years, negotiations took place to acquire full control of the region with the creation of the Rupert's Land Act 1868 and the North-Western Territory Transfer Act of 1870. Even though the government acquired the land from the Hudson's Bay Company, they failed to have full control and use of the land; this transfer solely provided sovereignty over the area.

One of the conditions to ensure British Columbia would join Confederation at the time was the construction of the Canadian Pacific Railway to connect it to the rest of the nation. This major infrastructure project would have to go through the interior of the newly acquired land and through First Nation territory. Canadian law, as set out in the Royal Proclamation, recognized that the First Nations who inhabited these lands prior to European contact had title to the land. In order to satisfy British Columbia's request and the growing need for land by eastern settlers and new immigrants, treaties had to be created with the First Nations in the interior.

Similarly, the later treaties of the turn of the century were not conducted until the land was useful for government purposes. When gold was discovered in the Klondike in the 1890s, Treaty 8 was established in the hopes of quelling tensions and conflicts between First Nations of the northern reaches and miners and traders. Despite the fact that First Nations of the Mackenzie River Valley were in economic need well before the 1920s, it was not until an abundance of oil was found that treaties needed to be implemented. The Government of Canada lobbied for treaties in the north only when potential development could be supported in the region. For political and economic reasoning, the Government of Canada hastily put treaties into place without regards to First Nation well-being.

=== First Nations ===
With Treaties 1–7, there was some resistance from members of the First Nations to the treaty process and growing anxiety that it would allow a flood of settlers, but many saw it as a way to secure much needed assistance. The First Nations at this time were suffering due to the changing dynamics of the west including disease, famine, and conflict. First Nations people were being decimated by disease, specifically smallpox, and tuberculosis which had catastrophic ramifications for several groups. Tsuu T'ina for example were decimated by Old World disease. Their population fell from several thousand to only 300 to 400 remaining within the 1800s. They began to suffer from famine due to the near extinction of the buffalo. Active participation in selling pemmican and hide in the fur trade, in addition to hunting for personal sustenance, meant that those living on the plains lacked a vital food source to maintain their livelihood. They were eager to receive food aid and other assistance from the government, which they believed would be offered following the implementation of treaties. Some First Nation groups also sought to ensure some form of education would be provided to them through the implementation of the treaties. Education was crucial to the First Nations because their cultural way of life was diminishing around them quite rapidly. They believed that the promise of education would not only help curb the loss of culture but also ensure their children's future success in a new developed West. In the northern regions of this land that was not covered by any treaty, the First Nations were suffering from similar issues, but had to continue to lobby the Canadian government for years before treaties were negotiated. A focus on materials needed for survival was placed when they did finally occur.

== Language ==
Unlike previous treaties, which included both First Nations and European tradition, the numbered treaties were conducted in a purely British diplomatic manner. First Nations were given translators, either of European or Métis descent, who were to translate what was being said during the discussions. What can be seen here is a significant difference between the written documents used by government officials of the time, and the oral traditions used by the First Nations communities throughout the negotiation process. This reality is proven through diaries like those of the Indian commissioner, Duncan Campbell Scott, who wrote a detailed account of negotiating Treaty 9 through Treaty 11. There are also claims from First Nations people that Alexander Morris failed to mention the surrender clause in the treaty text at the negotiations for Treaty 6, leading to miscommunication between the two groups. Evidence can also be found amongst the few written documents of the time by First Nations chiefs; during Treaty 3 negotiations, Chief Powasson took detailed notes during the negotiations, which shows the differences in understanding of what was being offered during the talks because of the language barrier.

The use of specific wording during the negotiations and within the treaties are also points of contention. The language used by the commissioners during the numbered treaties negotiations addressed First Nations tradition by giving them entitlement of children and the Crown was identified as Queen Mother. When the commissioner recognized First Nations peoples as children and the Crown as Queen Mother it ensured the First Nations people were to always to be protected from danger by their parents and enjoy their freedom. As the numbered treaties negotiations came to an end, the language use was significant to First Nations people. To seal the numbered treaties references to the natural world like, "You will always be cared for, all the time, as long as the sun walks" was used to appeal to the First Nations people.

Presentation copies of several numbered treaties

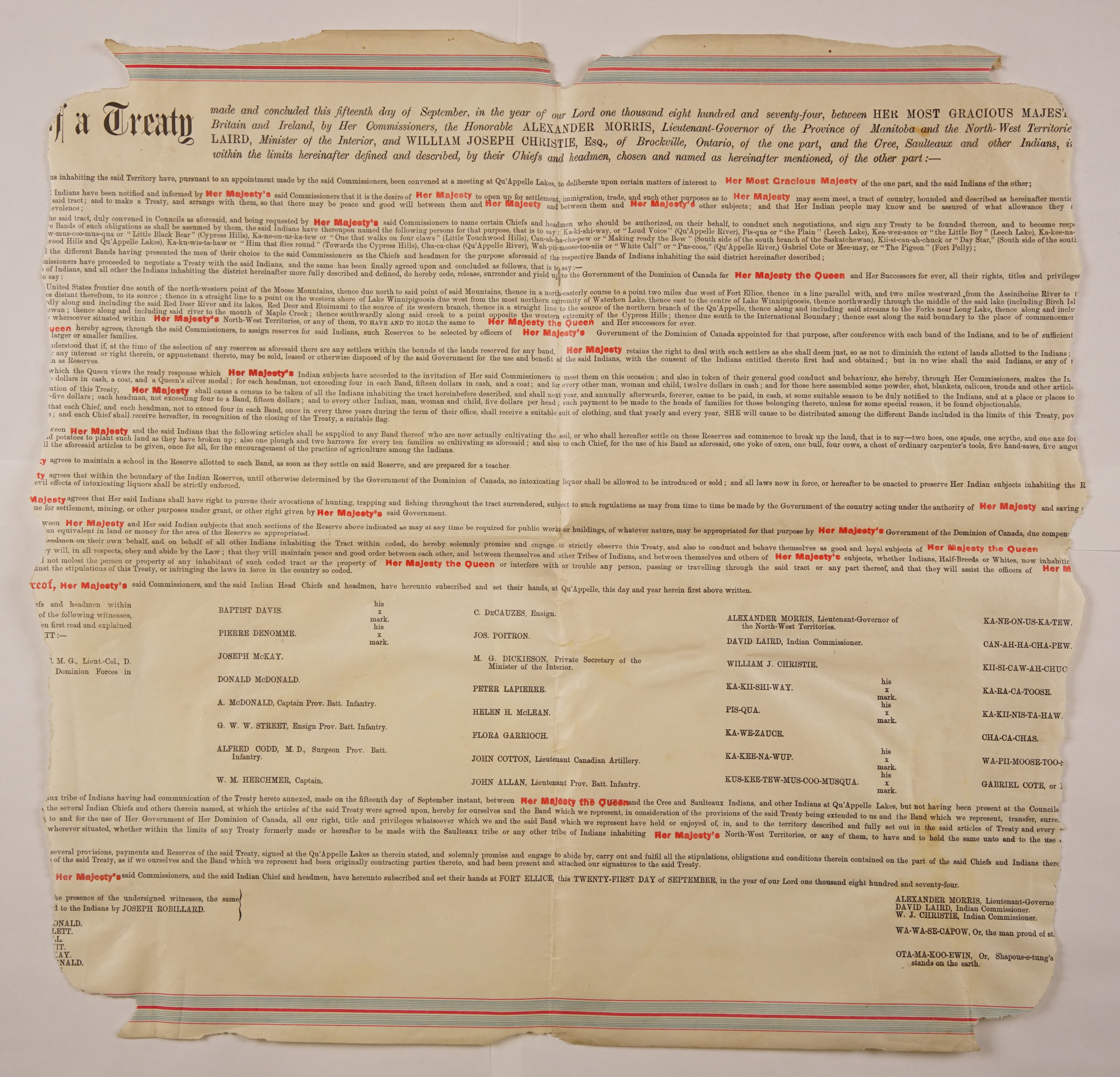
Treaty 4

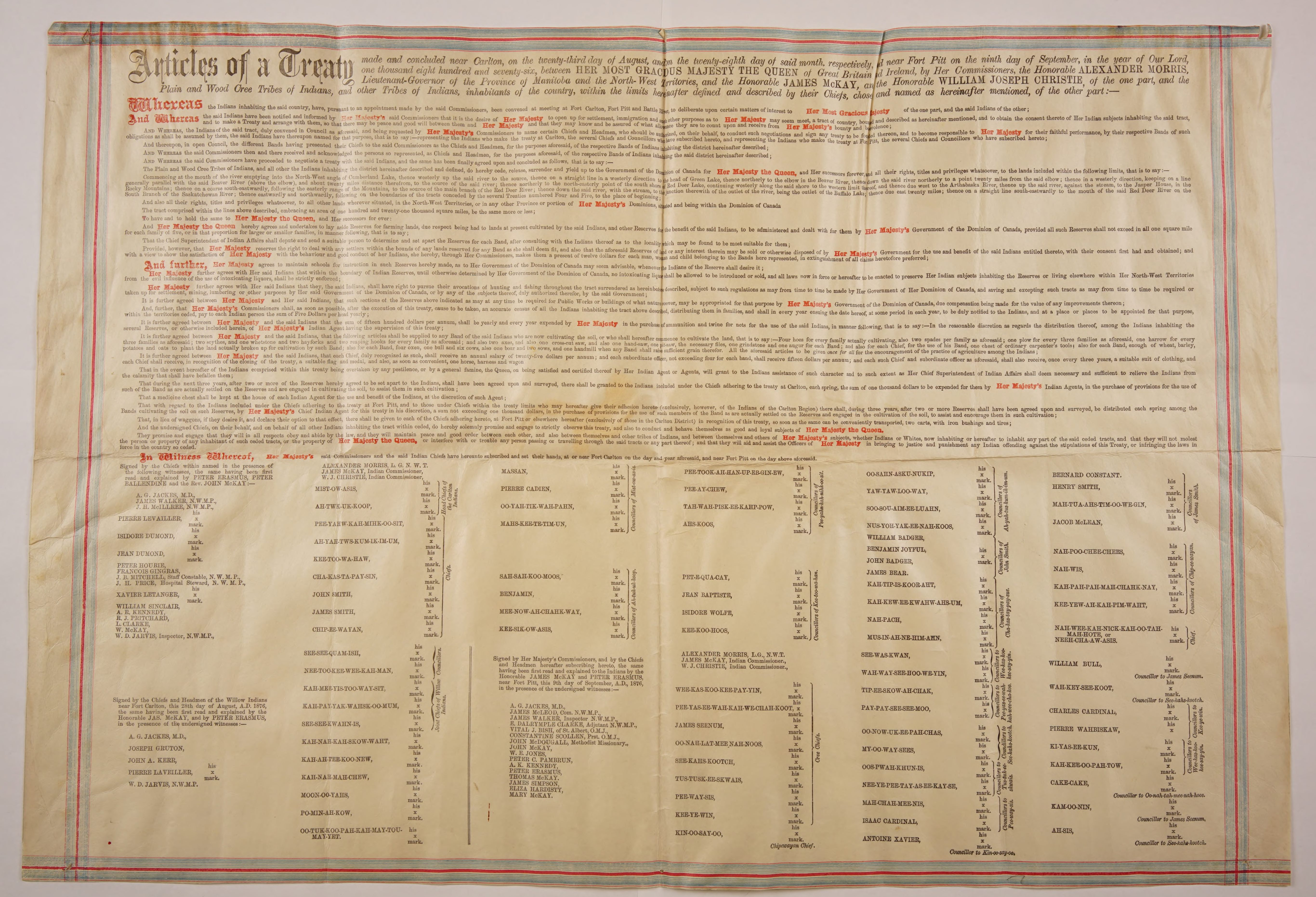
Treaty 6

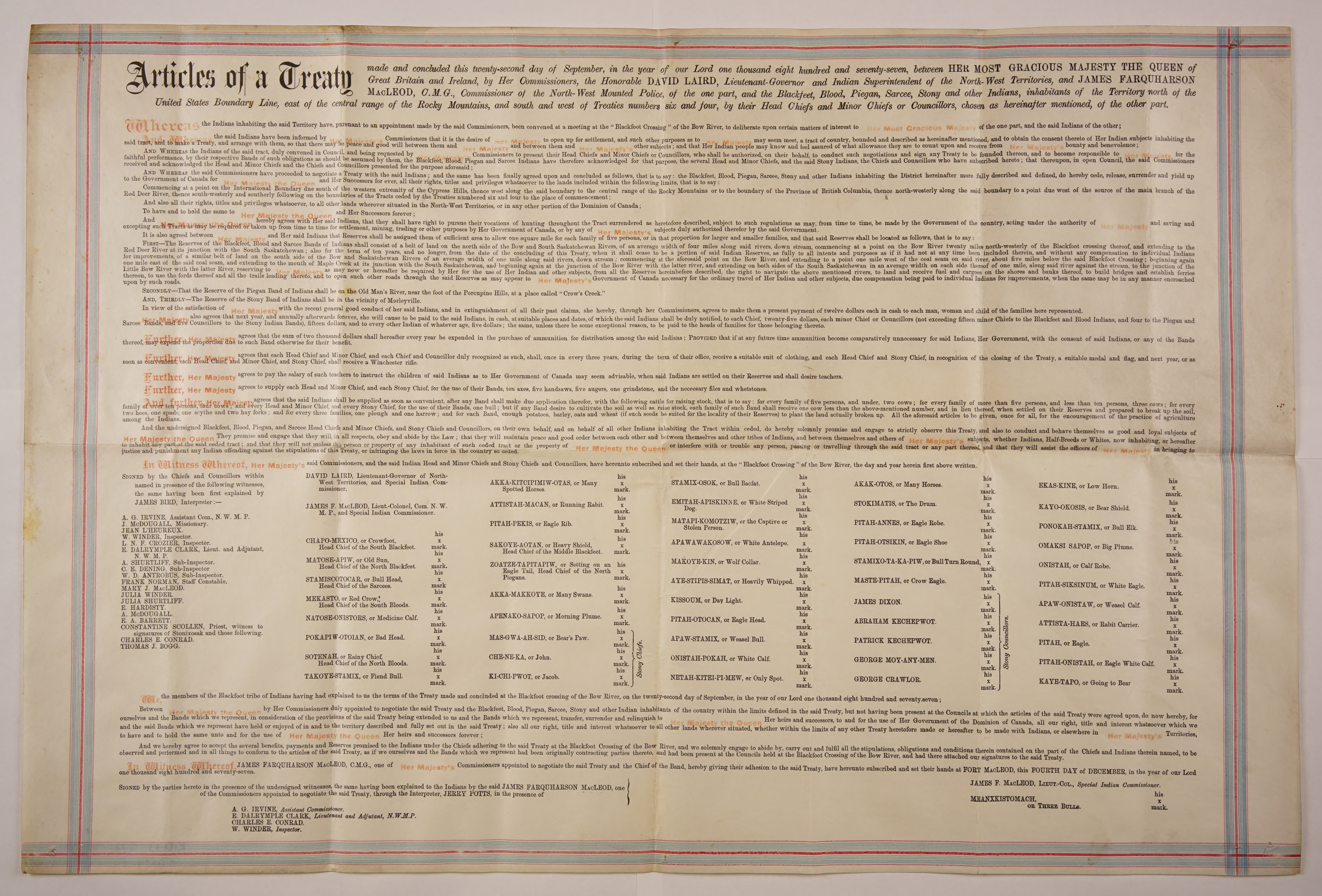
Treaty 7

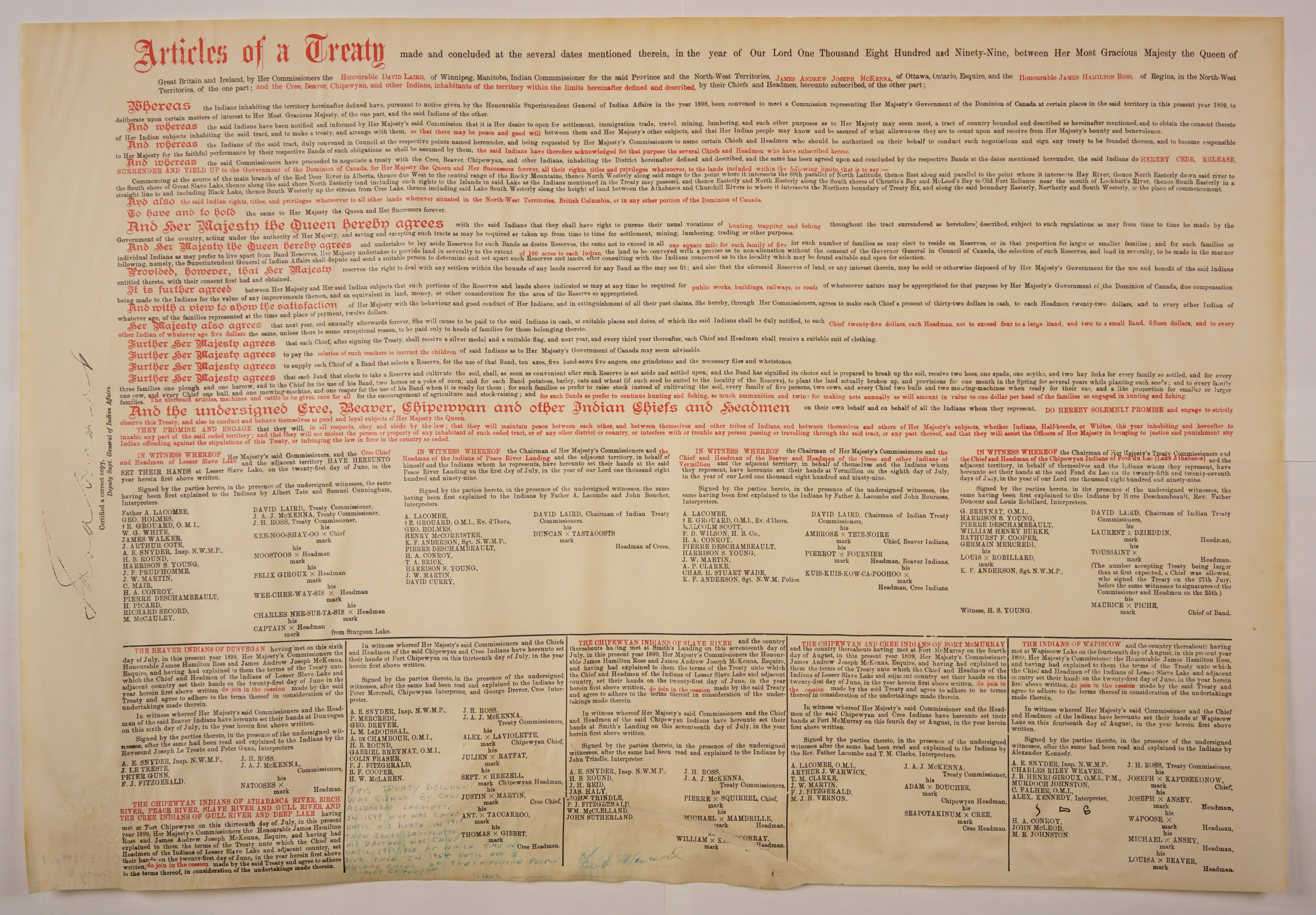
Treaty 8

These treaty presentation copies are held in the Bruce Peel Special Collections at University of Alberta Library. Each is printed on parchment with text in black and red and a blue and red border.

== List ==
In the table below is information about each numbered treaty including its signing date, its location, the major signers, those affected, and a brief summary of what each group received following the agreement.

Treaty number	First signed on	Location	Major treaty signers	Those affected	Brief summary
Treaty 1	3 August 1871	Lower Fort Garry, Fort Alexander	Adams Archibald (Lieutenant Governor of Manitoba), Wemyss Simpson (Indian Commissioner)	Chippewa Tribe, Swampy Cree Tribe, and all Indians inhabiting the district hereafter.	First Nations receive: Limited reserve land and monetary compensation, farming tools, education. Canada obtains: Land rights; promise of peace, law, and order, and restricted alcohol use on reserves
Treaty 2	21 August 1871	Manitoba Post	Adams Archibald (Lieutenant Governor of Manitoba), Wemyss Simpson (Indian Commissioner)	Chippewa Tribe of Indians, and all Indians inhabiting the district hereafter.	First Nations receive: Limited reserve land and monetary compensation; farming tools; education. Canada obtains: Land rights; promise of peace, law, and order, and restricted alcohol use on reserves
Treaty 3	3 October 1873	Northwest Angle of the Lake of the Woods	Alexander Morris (Lieutenant Governor), S. J. Dawson (Indian Commissioner)	The Saulteaux Tribe of the Ojibwe Indians and all Indians inhabiting the district hereafter.	First Nations receive: Limited reserve land, and monetary compensation; farming tools; right to hunt and fish on ceded land except that already used by Canada for resource extraction or settlement; schools on reserves. Canada obtains: Land rights; protection for land used for resource extraction or settlement from indigenous hunting/fishing, and restricted alcohol use on reserves
Treaty 4	15 September 1874	Fort Qu'Appelle, Fort Ellice, Swan Lake, Fort Pelly, Fort Walsh	Alexander Morris (Lieutenant Governor), William J. Christie (Indian Commissioner)	The Cree and Saulteaux Tribes of Indians, and all Indians inhabiting the district hereafter.	First Nations receive: Limited reserve land, and monetary compensation; farming tools; monetary allowance for gunpowder, shot, bale, and fishing net twine totalling $750/year; right to hunt and fish on ceded land except that already used by Canada for resource extraction or settlement; schools on reserves. Canada obtains: Land rights; protection for land used for resource extraction or settlement from indigenous hunting/fishing, and restricted alcohol use on reserves.
Treaty 5	20 September 1875 (adhesions in February 1889)	Beren's River, Norway House, Grand Rapids	Alexander Morris (Lieutenant Governor), James McKay (Indian Commissioner)	The Saulteaux and Swampy Cree Tribes of Indians, and all other Indians inhabiting the district hereafter.	First Nations receive: Limited reserve land, and monetary compensation; farming tools; monetary allowance for gunpowder, shot, bale, and fishing net twine totalling $300/year; right to hunt and fish on ceded land except that already used by Canada for resource extraction or settlement; schools on reserves when desired by First Nations, and deemed appropriate by Canada. Canada obtains: Land rights; protection for land used for resource extraction or settlement from indigenous hunting/fishing; restricted alcohol use on reserves; and full control of schooling on reserves.
Treaty 6	28 August 1876 (adhesion 9 September 1876, and February 1889)	Fort Carlton, Fort Pitt	Alexander Morris (Lieutenant Governor), James McKay (Indian Commissioner), William J. Christie (Indian Commissioner)	The Plain and Wood Cree Tribes of Indians, and all other Indians inhabiting the district hereafter.	First Nations receive: Limited reserve land, and monetary compensation; farming tools; monetary allowance for gunpowder, shot, bale, and fishing net twine totalling $1500/year; right to hunt and fish on ceded land except that already used by Canada for resource extraction or settlement; schools on reserves when desired by First Nations, and deemed appropriate by Canada; medicine chest clause is implemented; additional assistance is available for pestilence or famine relief Canada obtains: Land rights; protection for land used for resource extraction or settlement from indigenous hunting/fishing; restricted alcohol use on reserves; control of healthcare on reserves through the medicine chest initiative.
Treaty 7	22 September 1877	"Blackfoot Crossing" of the Bow River, Fort Macleod	David Laird (Government Official), James Macleod (Indian Commissioner),	The Blackfoot, Blood, Piegan, Sarcee, Stony, and all other Indians inhabiting the district hereafter.	First Nations receive: Limited reserve land, and monetary compensation; farming tools; monetary allowance for ammunition totalling $2000/year; right to hunt and fish on ceded land except that already used by Canada for resource extraction or settlement; have right to build and maintain infrastructure on reserves; salary is allocated to hire a school teacher for reserve school. Canada obtains: Land rights; protection for land used for resource extraction or settlement from indigenous hunting/fishing; restricted alcohol use on reserves.
Treaty 8	8 July 1899 (adhesions until 1901)	Lesser Slave Lake, Peace River Landing, Fort Vermilion, Fond-du-Lac, Dunvegan, Fort Chipewyan, Smiths Landing, Fort McMurray, Wapiscow Lake	David Laird (Treaty Commissioner), J. H. Ross (Treaty Commissioner), J. A. J. McKenna (Treaty Commissioner)	The Cree, Beaver, Chipewyan, and all other Indians inhabiting the district hereafter.	First Nations receive: Limited reserve land, and monetary compensation; farming tools; monetary allowance for ammunition and fishing net twine totalling $1 per family head; right to hunt and fish on ceded land except that already used by Canada for resource extraction or settlement; money is set aside to hire school teachers as needed. Canada obtains: Land rights; protection for land used for resource extraction or settlement from indigenous hunting/fishing; restricted alcohol use on reserves; ability to buy and sell Aboriginal land with their consent.
Treaty 9	6 November 1905	Osnaburg, Fort Hope, Marten Falls, Fort Albany, Moose Factory, New Post, Abitibi, Matachewan, Mattagami, Flying Post, New Brunswick House, Long Lake	Duncan Campbell Scott (Treaty Commissioner), Samuel Stewart (Treaty Commissioner), Daniel G. MacMartin	The Ojibway, Cree, and all other Indians inhabiting the district hereafter.	First Nations receive: Limited reserve land, and monetary compensation; farming tools; monetary allowance for ammunition and fishing net twine totalling $1 per family head; right to hunt and fish on ceded land except that already used by Canada for resource extraction or settlement; funds to hire teachers, construct schools, and purchase supplies are available, but with Canada's authorization. Canada obtains: Land rights; protection for land used for resource extraction or settlement from indigenous hunting/fishing; restricted alcohol use on reserves; full control funds for education.
Treaty 10	7 November 1906	Île-à-la-Crosse, Lac du Brochet	J. A. J. McKenna (Treaty Commissioner)	The Chipewyan, Cree, and all other Indians inhabiting the district hereafter.	First Nations receive: Limited reserve land, and monetary compensation; farming tools; right to hunt and fish on ceded land except that already used by Canada for resource extraction or settlement; unspecified amount of ammunition and twine distributed as government sees fit; provision for childhood education; furnishings for agricultural assistance Canada obtains: Land rights; protection for land used for resource extraction or settlement from indigenous hunting/fishing; restricted alcohol use on reserves; control of the allocation of ammunition and fishing twine, and the distribution of agricultural assistance.
Treaty 11	27 June 1921 until 22 August 1921	Northwest Territories; Fort Providence, Fort Simpson, Fort Wrigley, Fort Norman, Good Hope, Arctic Red River, Fort McPherson, Fort Liard, Fort Rae	Duncan Campbell Scott (Governor General/Major Signer), Henry Anthony Conroy (Indian Commissioner)	The Slavey, Dogrib, Loucheux, Hare, and other Indians, inhabitants of the territory within the limits hereinafter	First Nations receive: Limited reserve land, and monetary compensation; farming tools; right to hunt and fish on ceded land except that already used by Canada for resource extraction or settlement; provision for childhood education; furnishings for agricultural assistance; have right to build and maintain infrastructure on reserves; provision for childhood education; each family receives $50 annually for fishing twine and trapping; distribution of agricultural assistance possible. Canada obtains: Land rights; protection for land used for resource extraction or settlement from indigenous hunting/fishing; restricted alcohol use on reserves; ability to buy and sell Aboriginal land with permission; control of the allocation of ammunition and fishing twine, and the distribution of agricultural assistance.

== Perspectives ==
=== Government ===
The Crown's intentions were based upon expansion and transition. The treaties allowed the fur trading territory to house a new settler society. As stated in the written terms of the numbered treaties, the Crown desired "peace and goodwill" between First Nations and Her Majesty. In the view of the Crown, treaties were the agreement to trade First Nations territory for "bounty and benevolence". This language makes the First Nations wards of the state and under the government's protection. With these agreements, not only could the Dominion of Canada expand west and northward, but also First Nations could make the transition into a new economy. No longer would First Nations be dependent on a nomadic lifestyle, but rather begin to adapt and integrate into a western settlement society through farming and other entrepreneurial means. To treaty makers, the treaties were essentially a beneficial commercial exchange of both land and identity.

=== First Nations ===
Originally, First Nations people felt the treaties had the potential to satisfy the needs of their communities and foster mutual respect and understanding between themselves, the Crown, and all people of Canada. Throughout the signing of the treaties, First Nations believed that their agreement was everlasting, and had many reasons for believing so. For example, during the signing of Treaty 6, a pipe ceremony was conducted before the signing stipulating that nothing but the truth was to be spoken during negotiations.

== Effects and violations ==
Many First Nations groups felt the numbered treaties signed by the Dominion Government and their First Nations chiefs between 1877 and 1921 were rushed and disorganized, limiting to the Indigenous way of life and ultimately had poor results due to unfulfilled promises. Because of the treaties, Canada was seen as an oppressive colonizer at this time, most prominently because the government was more concerned with changing the various First Nations groups, rather than negotiating and collaborating with them. Some of the most prominent effects of the numbered treaties for First Nations groups included limited funds for education, supplies (such as fishing net twine) and minimal allocation of land as First Nations reserves. Upon signing the treaties, Canada obtained control of most aspects of society, especially in schooling, resource extraction, land use and implementation of laws for various social issues (such as alcohol policies).

The Dominion Government also violated many of the treaty terms; in restructuring and mandating education through the creation of residential schools, the government breached the treaty agreements around the question of education. Many First Nations were allocated less reserve lands than they were supposed to according to the Treaty, which resulted in many indigenous land claims based on treaty rights entitlements. Also, First Nations felt the agreements from the numbered treaties were dishonoured when their traditional forms of governance were removed and they became "wards of the state", and when Indian agents began to control the sale of their seeds and livestock. Further restrictions and policies were put in place that controlled First Nations' way of life beyond the original stipulations that were outlined in the numbered treaties.

The American Indian Movement of the 1960s interpreted the treaties as being invalid because they were:

- coerced, accordingly not an agreement between equal partners
- breached many times in their history by the government, notably by the residential school system and resource extraction
- not reached by agreement with the lawful hereditary chiefs, and especially without the involvement of women who by tradition often had final authority

As a result of the agency asserted during treaty negotiations and the active pursuit of treaty revisions by Indigenous leaders like Plains Cree chiefs Pitikwahanapiwiyin (also known as Pound Maker) and Mistahimaskwa (Big Bear), Crown officials acting to establish and maintain the Numbered Treaties had to resort to exploiting environmental conditions such as epidemics and hunger crises as well as utilizing underhanded tactics of arrest and incarceration of leaders in order to gain control over and coerce First Nations who continuously protested the broken promises, attacks on Indigenous autonomy, and theft of land surrounding the Crown's manipulations of agreed upon Treaty terms and language.

== Legacy ==
In 1981, all provinces other than Quebec agreed to a constitutional amendment, which included a reiteration of the rights of the indigenous peoples of Canada as established by former treaties (Chapter 35). Subsequent attempts (Meech Lake Accord, Charlottetown Accord) to try to appease the government of Quebec with certain constitutional provisions, such as the recognition of Quebec as a "distinct society" failed in part due to First Nations opposition. Many aboriginal leaders saw this renegotiation as an opportune time to enshrine the increased rights and powers and recognition that they had been campaigning for since the process of patriating the Canadian constitution began in the 1970s. With Newfoundland and Manitoba as the only provinces yet to sign the Meech Lake Accord, First Nations groups in Manitoba mobilized and managed, with the legislative maneuvering of the then Chief of the Red Sucker Lake First Nation and member of the Manitoba Legislative Assembly Elijah Harper, to delay the ratification of the accord until the legislative session ended for the summer, essentially "killing" the bill to ratify the accord, and with that, the Meech Lake Accord itself. Later, controversy occurred during the 1995 Quebec independence referendum, with differing points of view regarding the rights of provincial and indigenous nations to end or maintain their union with Canada, though it had never been in dispute that First Nations would have to voluntarily agree with their formal treaty partner, the Canadian Crown, to modify the treaties.

In 2010, Canada signed the United Nations Declaration on the Rights of Indigenous Peoples. In 2011 and again in 2012 the United Nations criticized the federal government over Attawapiskat. In 2012 in Daniels v. Canada the Federal Court of Canada ruled that 200,000 off-reserve First Nations people and 400,000 Métis were also "Indians" under s. 91(24) of the Constitution Act, 1867. These had no formal representation at the Assembly of First Nations, which had hitherto been assumed by the federal government to speak authoritatively on all matters involving "Indians".

In 2012 the Idle No More movement and subsequent hunger strike by Attawapiskat First Nation Chief Theresa Spence brought the assertion that the treaties provide for direct Crown recourse back to public attention. Chief Spence demanded direct Crown attention to the Cabinet's attempt to remove federal government oversight of lands and waters and environmental issues that duplicated provincial oversight of the same. After an agreement by opposition parties was struck to end Chief Spence's hunger strike, the legal analysis that supported the principle of direct Crown recourse was adamantly supported by interim Liberal Party of Canada leader Bob Rae and others. Idle No More itself presented its legal analysis via Pamela Palmater. Her analysis resembled that of Matthew Coon Come, who summarized the Grand Council of the Crees position in a scholarly analysis of the Quebec sovereignty movement and its authority to withdraw from Confederation taking First Nations territory with it. Both his analysis and Palmater's emphasize the need for voluntary renegotiation of treaties between equal partners, and the impossibility of cutting off any avenue of appeal to the Crown.

In 2024, APTN premiered Treaty Road, a documentary series about the treaties and their impact on Canada's indigenous peoples.

== See also ==
- British Columbia Treaty Process
- Douglas Treaties
- Indian Act
- James Bay and Northern Quebec Agreement
- Robinson Treaties
- Two Row Wampum Treaty
