= Cowichan Tribes v. Canada =

2025 BC Supreme Court land claim decision

- Court: Supreme Court of British Columbia
- Full case name: Cowichan Tribes v. Canada (Attorney General)
- Decided: 7 August 2025
- Citation: 2025 BCSC 1490

Court membership
- Judge sitting: Barbara M. Young

Cowichan Tribes v. Canada is a decision by the Supreme Court of British Columbia establishing that the Cowichan Tribes have Aboriginal title to approximately 732 acres of a riverine area in the city of Richmond. The decision was made, in part, on the basis that the disputed land had been used exclusively as a Cowichan summer fishing village in 1846, the date of assertion of British sovereignty over what later became British Columbia, Canada. All parties involved in the case have expressed their intention to appeal to the British Columbia Court of Appeal.

For the area over which the decision awarded the Cowichan Aboriginal land title, the court declared that the land titles of the national government and the City of Richmond were "defective and invalid" meaning that, if the ruling is upheld on appeal, the Cowichan could eventually take control of the land and use it as they see fit. The court suspended its declaration for 18 months since it "will change a long-established status quo and have significant impacts for Richmond and third-party lessees on the lands that Canada owns."

The Cowichan's claim was only against governments, and the court did not invalidate the fee simple titles of private landowners where Aboriginal title was granted. However, the court declared that the Cowichan Aboriginal title is a "prior and senior right" to other property interests, whether the land is publicly-held or privately-held. Further, the court ruled that the government's granting of private fee simple titles "unjustifiably infringe" the Cowichan's Aboriginal title. The court declared that "Aboriginal title and fee simple interest can coexist," and it leaves to future litigation to determine the extent to which the Cowichan can influence how the privately-owned fee simple lands over which they hold Aboriginal title are used.

The ruling is the first in Canada where Aboriginal title has been established over privately-owned land. The judgement has potentially widespread implications for private property ownership in the province of British Columbia, and perhaps elsewhere in Canada.

The trial was the longest in Canadian history, concluding 11 years after legal proceedings began, and 6 years after the trial started.

== Participants in the trial ==
Cowichan Tribes was the plaintiff in the case. The defendants were the federal government (Attorney General of Canada), the province of British Columbia (B.C.), the City of Richmond, the Vancouver Fraser Port Authority, the Musqueam First Nation, and the Tsawwassen First Nation.

No private landowners were parties to the lawsuit, although the ruling affects approximately 145 private properties (45 in the title area, and an additional 100 within the rest of the claim area, according to the premier's office). Early in the court proceedings, the court rejected a request by the City of Richmond, the province of B.C., and the federal government to require the Cowichan to provide formal notice to affected landowners. The Cowichan argued that such notice would be an invitation for hundreds of people to join the litigation, which would slow the case. B.C. Supreme Court Justice Jennifer Power (the judge who oversaw early stages of the litigation) ruled in 2017 that private landowners did not need to be notified during the trial because they "will have an opportunity to make all arguments, including that they were not given formal notice, in any subsequent proceedings against them if any such proceedings are brought." After the trial, the provincial and federal governments supported a request to the court by some landowners to reopen the case and to name them as a party in the litigation. Justice Young denied the request in June 2026, and in July 2026 the landowners appealed her decision.

== The claim area ==
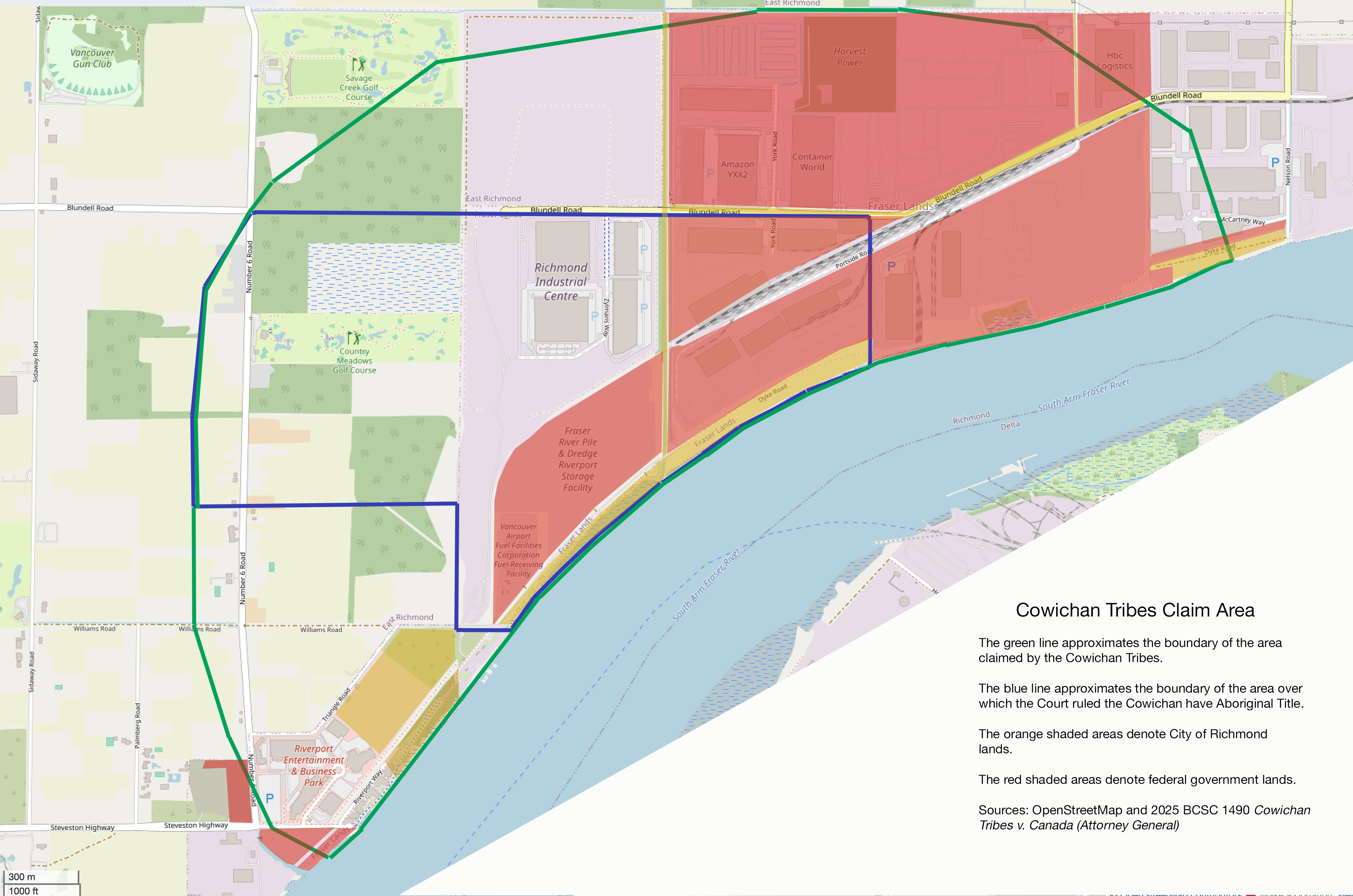
Cowichan Tribes claim area map

The land claimed by the Cowichan Tribes is approximately 1,846 acres (747 hectares) on Lulu Island in the City of Richmond. Before the court decision, the property in the claim area was worth an estimated $1.3 to $2 billion, and includes a port terminal; airport jet fuel facilities; industrial, commercial, and agricultural businesses; and residential properties. The boundary of the territory claimed is based on the extended land management area of a former Cowichan summer settlement, as determined by historical geographer and cartographer Dr. Kenneth Brealey.

== The ruling ==
In August 2025, a B.C. Supreme Court judge ruled that the Cowichan Tribes had established Aboriginal title to approximately 732 acres in the City of Richmond, and the Cowichan were granted recognition of an Aboriginal Right to fish the south arm of the Fraser River. The judge declared that land titles held by Canada and Richmond were "defective and invalid", meaning that if the Cowichan's win is upheld on appeal, they could take control of the land and use it as they see fit. The judge suspended her declaration for 18 months so the Cowichan, Canada, and Richmond "have the opportunity to make the necessary arrangements." She wrote that her declaration "will change a long-established status quo" and have significant impacts for Richmond and third-party lessees on the lands that the government of Canada owned, and that "much remains to be resolved."

The Court also determined that wherever Aboriginal title is found to exist, it is a "prior and senior right" to other property interests, whether the land is public or private. The judge ruled that where Aboriginal and fee simple title exist for the same parcel of land, the government's grant of fee simple title "unjustifiably infringed" on the Cowichan Aboriginal title. ("Fee simple" title is as close to absolute ownership title as exists in the Canadian system of property law.) The Court did not invalidate the land titles held by private fee simple landowners, as the Cowichan's claim was only against governments. The ruling leaves to future litigation a determination of to what extent the Cowichan can influence how the fee simple private lands over which they hold Aboriginal title are used. The City of Richmond has told affected private landowners that, since the Cowichan Tribes have been granted Aboriginal title, this "may compromise the status and validity" of their land ownership.

The court rejected the argument that the Land Title Act could shield fee simple title from Aboriginal title claims, finding that Aboriginal title exists outside the land title system. The judge relied on B.C.'s Interpretation Act which requires legislation to be interpreted in a way that does not diminish Aboriginal rights. The Court noted that interpreting the Land Title Act to override Aboriginal title would conflict with the United Nations Declaration on the Rights of Indigenous Peoples (UNDRIP) which was incorporated into B.C. law in 2019 in its Declaration on the Rights of Indigenous Peoples Act.

=== The basis for the finding of Aboriginal title ===
The test for Aboriginal title was, in part, whether the Cowichan could prove sufficient and exclusive occupation of land as of just prior to the date of assertion of Canadian sovereignty, with that date being 1846. (In 1846 the British government declared sovereignty over what later became British Columbia by entering into the Oregon Treaty with the U.S.)

In 1846, the ancestors of the Cowichan, who then numbered around 1000 people, used the area in dispute (a portion of Lulu Island in the city of Richmond) for a few months each summer for fishing. Their permanent home was on Vancouver Island. To meet the test of "exclusive" occupation required to establish Aboriginal title, the Cowichan had to prove that they effectively used intimidation and force so that other Indigenous groups, like the Musqueam and Tsawwassen (who both opposed the Cowichan claim), would have been reluctant to use the claimed area when the Cowichan were away.

The Colony of B.C. started issuing fee simple titles in the Richmond area in the 1860s. Around this time the government started, but did not complete, a process to create a reserve for the Cowichan in the area (a Cowichan reserve was declared on Vancouver Island in 1867). The Cowichan that had fished in the area during the summer left by about 1870, and there has been no connection between them and the area since. Various courts have ruled that there is no need for continuous occupation.

In determining the specific areas which had been exclusively occupied by the Cowichan in 1846, the judge relied on witnesses who gave oral evidence handed down from their ancestors, referred to as hearsay evidence in legal terms. Such evidence is generally inadmissible in common law, but the Supreme Court of Canada has permitted its use for Aboriginal peoples to substantiate their cases.

=== The Cowichan claim objectives ===
Cowichan Tribes Chief Cindy Daniels said "As stated in our 2016 declaration of reconciliation, our land and resources objectives are to recover and restore our village and surrounding lands, re-establish our permanent residence and river access, re-establish our cultural practices including those that support food security and sustainability, realize economic development and re-establish the truth of our history in that region."

The chief negotiator for the Cowichan, Robert Morales, said the Cowichan did not want to displace "the ordinary British Columbian from their land, understanding that that's a pretty serious position to take." Regardless of what the Cowichan sought, the court found that governmental grants of fee simple title to the lands at issue were an "unjustified infringement of Cowichan Aboriginal title". The Cowichan's claim is over land held by governments, although (outside of this lawsuit) their position could change if their leadership changes.

=== Arguments of the defence ===
One of the key issues in the case was whether Aboriginal title was extinguished when the fee simple titles were created. The City of Richmond was the only party at the trial to argue that the post-Confederation "Crown" (i.e., government) grants of fee simple title issued over the area between 1871 and 1914 necessarily extinguished Aboriginal title. The mayor of Richmond said there is an expectation that "any legitimate defence which can protect the people should be taken."

The federal government abandoned the extinguishment defence in 2018. Lawyers for B.C. were guided by a "civil litigation directive" established by Premier David Eby when he was provincial attorney general, which states the province will not advance arguments based upon the unilateral extinguishment of Aboriginal rights. While the court rejected the extinguishment argument, finding that Crown grants were made without constitutional authority (Canada's 1982 constitution does not include private property rights, but includes Aboriginal rights and title), the stance of the defendants may have influenced the outcome, since the court works with the arguments presented.

The judge noted that B.C. argued "the content of any Aboriginal title rights that the Cowichan may have today is necessarily limited by the fee simple interests." The trial judge said some of the province's arguments were rejected since they were inconsistent with B.C.'s own legal acts. Specifically, the judge's decision was influenced by the province of B.C.'s April 2024 decision to recognize Aboriginal title to Haida Gwaii (an archipelago on B.C.'s west coast where around half the population of 5000 are Haida). Also noted was the province's passage of the Declaration on the Rights of Indigenous Peoples Act which requires B.C. law to be consistent with the UNDRIP, which says Aboriginal groups have the right to own, use, develop, and control any lands that they traditionally occupied or used.

== Implications and reactions ==
=== Impact on landowners in the claim area ===
The mayor of Richmond, Malcolm Brodie, said that, in the past, if you held fee simple ownership "you didn't have to worry about an Aboriginal claim against your property. Now that line is gone". Experts in valuation consulting on behalf of local landowners campaigning for a reduction in property tax say the properties in the claim area no longer have value, and are not saleable. The Globe and Mail columnist Gary Mason came to the same conclusion. Some homeowners have experienced difficulty getting a mortgage, although the province said it would provide financing for homeowners and business owners, if needed. The lead lawyer for the Cowichan Nation said fee simple land sales in the claim area would need the consent of the Cowichan to go ahead, and "it would be with some accommodation from the Crown (government) to the Cowichan Nation."

The Court appears to contemplate some circumstances in which Aboriginal title and fee simple title might co-exist, with Aboriginal tile as a "burden" on fee simple land. By contrast, the City of Richmond says "Aboriginal title and fee simple title cannot co-exist" since "There cannot be two competing rights of exclusive ownership and possession of the same land."

=== Impact on landowners in other parts of British Columbia ===
If upheld after appeal, the ruling would mean that a Court may invalidate fee simple title if indigenous bodies can prove Aboriginal title to the fee simple parcel in B.C. A leading expert in Indigenous law in Canada, Thomas Isaac, notes: "The judge expressly states in the decision that, in B.C., you cannot rely solely on your title as unquestionable evidence of ownership of land", and he adds that the judge did not restrict this to the Cowichan title land.

The Cowichan ruling has created uncertainty regarding private land ownership in B.C., where there were half a dozen active land claims cases at the time of the ruling in August 2025. There may be many more, according to a member of the B.C. legislature, who says the public has not been fully informed about Aboriginal title claims. Other cases have not yet gone to trial, for example, the Shuswap (Secwépemc) Nation is seeking a declaration of Aboriginal title to an area that includes the city of Kamloops. The Dzawada'enuxw First Nation relied on the Cowichan case when it filed a civil suit on 26 January 2026 that seeks a court declaration to almost 650 hectares of fee simple lands around Kingcome Inlet.

=== Impact on landowners in other parts of Canada ===
The case could have implications in other parts of Canada, according to B.C. Premier David Eby, and observers say "the floodgates have been opened" for more Aboriginal title claims. An Algonquin First Nation has filed a similar title claim in Quebec Superior Court. In 2024, a court in New Brunswick ruled that if the Wolastoqey Nations can prove Aboriginal title, that title would apply over all lands within the claim area (more than 50% of the province), including private lands.

=== Implications for governments ===
Some businesses are planning to relocate out of the Richmond land claim area, and this could have an impact on economic activity and tax revenue.

A number of professionals and politicians expressed uncertainty about the regulatory implications of the ruling. One lawyer concluded that following the decision, there was legal uncertainty as to whether the city of Richmond, the Cowichan, or both have the jurisdiction to zone, expropriate, or levy taxes. According to other lawyers, the 2014 Tsilhqotʼin Nation v British Columbia decision suggests that the extent to which a particular provincial law applies may depend on whether the legislature wanted it to apply and, if yes, whether the law constitutes a "meaningful diminution" of Aboriginal title (in which case it may need to meet tests for "justification", "rational connection", "minimal impairment" and "proportionality of impact").

== Appeals ==
All seven parties involved in the case have said they will appeal the verdict. The Cowichan are appealing because the court's decision recognized only 40% of the 1,846 acres they claimed.

The Musqueam and Tsawwassen First Nations are appealing the "devastating" decision because the area overlaps with their own traditional territories.

The City of Richmond said it would appeal as it opposed the Court's "unprecedented" decision "which compromises the entire land title system in British Columbia."

B.C.'s Attorney-General said the province would appeal, and that "A private property right sits above [Aboriginal] title." However, political commentators say adopting this stance during the appeal would imply a change in approach, as the province did not make this argument during the trial.

The government of Canada, like the province of British Columbia and the City of Richmond, has said it is appealing because the decision could pose significant unintended consequences for private property owners. Although not part of the appeal process, some private landowners in the claim area have asked the federal government to refer the matter to the Supreme Court of Canada with "some respectful and fair questions, including whether Aboriginal title was extinguished when private land was created over a century ago".

The appeal is unlikely to take less than a year to resolve, and could take two or three years. Given the uncertainty and lack of legal clarity from the judgement on how Aboriginal title and private property interact, the case is likely to move on to the Supreme Court of Canada. Overall legal costs after the conclusion of all appeals were estimated to be around $100 million.

== See also ==
=== Related Court Cases ===
- Calder v. British Columbia (1973) – Recognized that Aboriginal title exists in Canadian law.
- Guerin v. The Queen (1984) – Established that the Crown has a fiduciary duty to Indigenous peoples regarding reserve lands.
- R v. Sparrow (1990) – The first Supreme Court case to interpret Section 35 of the Constitution Act (1982), and established the "Sparrow test" (to determine whether a government action infringes on an Aboriginal right and whether that infringement is justified for conservation or public interest).
- Delgamuukw v. British Columbia (1997) – Established the framework which set the legal test for Aboriginal title.
- R. v. Marshall (1999) – Expanded the interpretation of historic treaties and Indigenous economic rights, and said treaty rights are not unlimited and can be regulated for conservation or other compelling public objectives.
- Tsilhqot'in Nation v. British Columbia (2014) – Found that Aboriginal title can apply to large, contiguous areas used seasonally or semi-permanently.
