= British Columbia Treaty Process =

Land claims negotiation process

The British Columbia Treaty Process (BCTP) is a land claims negotiation process started in 1993 to resolve outstanding issues, including claims to un-extinguished indigenous rights, with British Columbia's First Nations.

Three treaties have been implemented under the BCTP. The Nisga'a Final Agreement is considered separate from the Treaty Process because those negotiations began before the BC treaty process was started, and it has been called a blueprint for the current process. To represent the interests of First Nations involved with the process, the First Nations Summit was created. There are officially 60% of First Nations bands in the process, but only 20% are said to be making progress. About 40% of First Nations are not involved in the treaty process.

== History ==
=== Previous negotiations ===
Because the Royal Proclamation of 1763 stated that the Crown must negotiate and sign treaties with the Indigenous people before land could be ceded to a colony, the Numbered Treaties were negotiated in most parts of the Prairie Provinces. The Government of the Colony of British Columbia, however, failed to negotiate many treaties and as a result, most of the province's land is not covered by treaties. The few exceptions are the 14 Douglas Treaties on Vancouver Island, Treaty 8 (1899) in the Northeast of B.C., and the 2000 Nisgaʼa Final Agreement.

Relations between Indigenous peoples and the B.C. government worsened over time, as the McKenna–McBride Royal Commission led to the redistribution of reserve lands and the Allied Tribes of British Columbia was essentially dissolved by an amendment to the Indian Act. First Nations were not allowed to organize or raise money to pursue land claims. In the second half of the 20th century, demands for the recognition of Aboriginal title were buoyed by various court decisions in B.C., including Calder v British Columbia (AG) and R v Sparrow.

In 1990, the governments of Canada, B.C. and First Nations established the B.C. Claims Task Force to investigate how treaty negotiations might begin and what they should cover. The following year, the provincial government accepted the concept of Aboriginal rights (including the inherent right to self-government) as official policy. The Claims Task Force made 19 recommendations and suggested a six-stage process for negotiating new treaties.

=== Treaty Commission and process ===
The British Columbia Treaty Commission is the independent body which oversees the treaty process. B.C. treaty commissioners were first appointed in April 1993, and the treaty process officially began in December 1993. By 1996, 47 First Nations, representing more than 60% of status Indians in B.C., had decided to participate. After a few years of negotiations, the Treaty Commission released the 1997 Systems Overload Report which argued that the provincial and federal governments needed to increase their financial resources and the capacity level of First Nations for the negotiation of treaties in BC.

The following year, the Supreme Court of Canada rendered its decision on Delgamuukw v British Columbia, recognizing Aboriginal title as "a right to the land itself", which derives from First Nations original occupation and possession at the time the Crown asserted sovereignty. The court also stated that the federal and provincial governments may infringe upon Aboriginal title under conditions for justification but that fair compensation would be due at the time of such an infringement.

Sechelt First Nation was the first community to sign an agreement-in-principle (AIP) in 1999. Members of the Sliammon First Nation (Tlaʼamin First Nation) voted to reject their negotiated AIP in 2001, but then approved the AiP in June 2003. Tlaʼamin Nation later ratified a final agreement with BC & Canada in 2012, which is in effect as of 2016. Six of 12 member nations of the Nuu-chah-nulth Tribal Council likewise rejected their AIP. The five Maa-nulth First Nations of the Nuu-chah-nulth ratified their treaty in October 2007. The BC government has ratified the final agreement which is yet to be ratified in the federal parliament. Ditidaht First Nation has subsequently taken legal action against the Maa-nulth in a dispute over land and resource ownership.

In 2002, the governing BC Liberal Party mailed out ballots for a provincial referendum on principles for treaty negotiations. However, the referendum failed due to controversy over its phrasing and logistics, which generated protests and a boycott.

In May 1993 the Treaty Commission allocated approximately CA$432 million in negotiation support funding to more than 50 First Nations: $345.6 million in the form of loans and $86.4 million in the form of contributions. Of that money the Treaty Commission's total operating costs from 1993 to March 31, 2009, spent $34.2 million. One successfully negotiated treaty was rejected, by the Lheidli Tʼenneh First Nation, in 2007.

In July 2007, the Tsawwassen First Nation members voted 70% in favour of the treaty. The treaty more than doubled the size of the Tsawwassen reserve, provided a one-time capital transfer of CA$13.9 million, $2 million for relinquishing mineral rights under English Bluff, $13.5 million for startup and transition costs, $7.3 million for a number of funds for the purposes of resource management and economic development and $2.6 annually for ongoing programs and services, and reserves a portion of the Fraser River salmon catch to the Tsawwassen. In return, the Tsawwassen abandoned other land claims and will eventually pay taxes.

The Temexw Treaty Association, whose members are signatories to the Douglas Treaties, is also attempting to negotiate within the BC Treaty Process.

A November 2007 court ruling for the Xeni Gwetʼin First Nation called future participation in the process into question. The judge's ruling included a non-binding opinion that the Xeni Gwetʼin could demonstrate Aboriginal title to half of the Nemaiah Valley, and that the province had no power over these lands. Under the BC treaty process, negotiating nations have received 5% of their claimed land recognized. Grand Chief Stewart Phillip, president of the Union of B.C. Indian Chiefs, called the court ruling a "nail in the coffin" of the B.C. treaty process. Notwithstanding such legal rulings (sustained later in the 2015 Supreme Court of Canada decision, Tsilhqotʼin Nation v British Columbia), the BC Treaty Process continues, as more than half of all First Nations in BC continue through the stages of the process. As of 2016, 4 Nations had completed and were implementing treaties; 7 were in Stage 5, and 42 were in Stage 4.

== Process ==
The treaty process is a six-stage negotiation between the federal government, the provincial government, and First Nations. A combination of contribution (grant) funding and loans are provided to First Nations on cost-share basis by the federal and provincial governments to support negotiation efforts.

The British Columbia Treaty Commission accepts First Nations into the process, allocates negotiation support funding and monitors the progress of negotiations.

The process:

- Stage 1: statement of intent to negotiate
- Stage 2: readiness to negotiate
- Stage 3: negotiation of a framework agreement
- Stage 4: negotiation of an agreement in principle
- Stage 5: negotiation to finalize a treaty
- Stage 6: implementation of the treaty

== Criticisms ==
The voice of criticisms have come from different angles in Indigenous communities across British Columbia and Canada, and from the non-native society as well. About two-thirds of First Nations are not involved with the Treaty Process; some have formed the "Unity Protocol", calling for an overhaul of the entire process.

- Extinguishment of Aboriginal title
- Continued assimilation strategies
- Changing the Indigenous peoples from nations to municipal style government.

The Fraser Institute, a Canadian think tank, released a report in 2008 criticizing the B.C. Treaty Process as "incomplete, illiberal and expensive".

Several assessments of why the treaty process have been made to attempt to more effectively conclude modern-day treaties:

- a 2008 report by the Standing Senate Committee on Aboriginal Peoples, Honouring the Spirit of Modern Treaties: Closing the Loopholes
- former Campbell River Mayor, James Lornie's 2011 report, Final Report with Recommendations Regarding the Possibility of Accelerating Negotiations With Common Table First Nations that are in the BC Treaty Process, and Any Steps Required
- the Senate Standing Committee's 2012 final report, A Commitment Worth Preserving: Reviving the British Columbia Treaty Process
- the 2015 Doug Eyford report, commissioned by the federal Minister Bernard Valcourt, A New Direction: Advancing Aboriginal and Treaty Rights
- and the 2016 Multilateral Engagement Process to Improve and Expedite Treaty Negotiations in British Columbia, prepared jointly by the Governments of Canada, BC, and the BC First Nations Summit.

All of these analyze chronic problems of the process such as lack of governmental commitment and the burden of loans taken out by First Nations to support their involvement in the unexpectedly long process of reaching final agreements.

== See also ==
- The Canadian Crown and Indigenous peoples of Canada
- Status of First Nations treaties in British Columbia
