= Extinguishment of Aboriginal title in Canada =

Canadian indigenous legislation

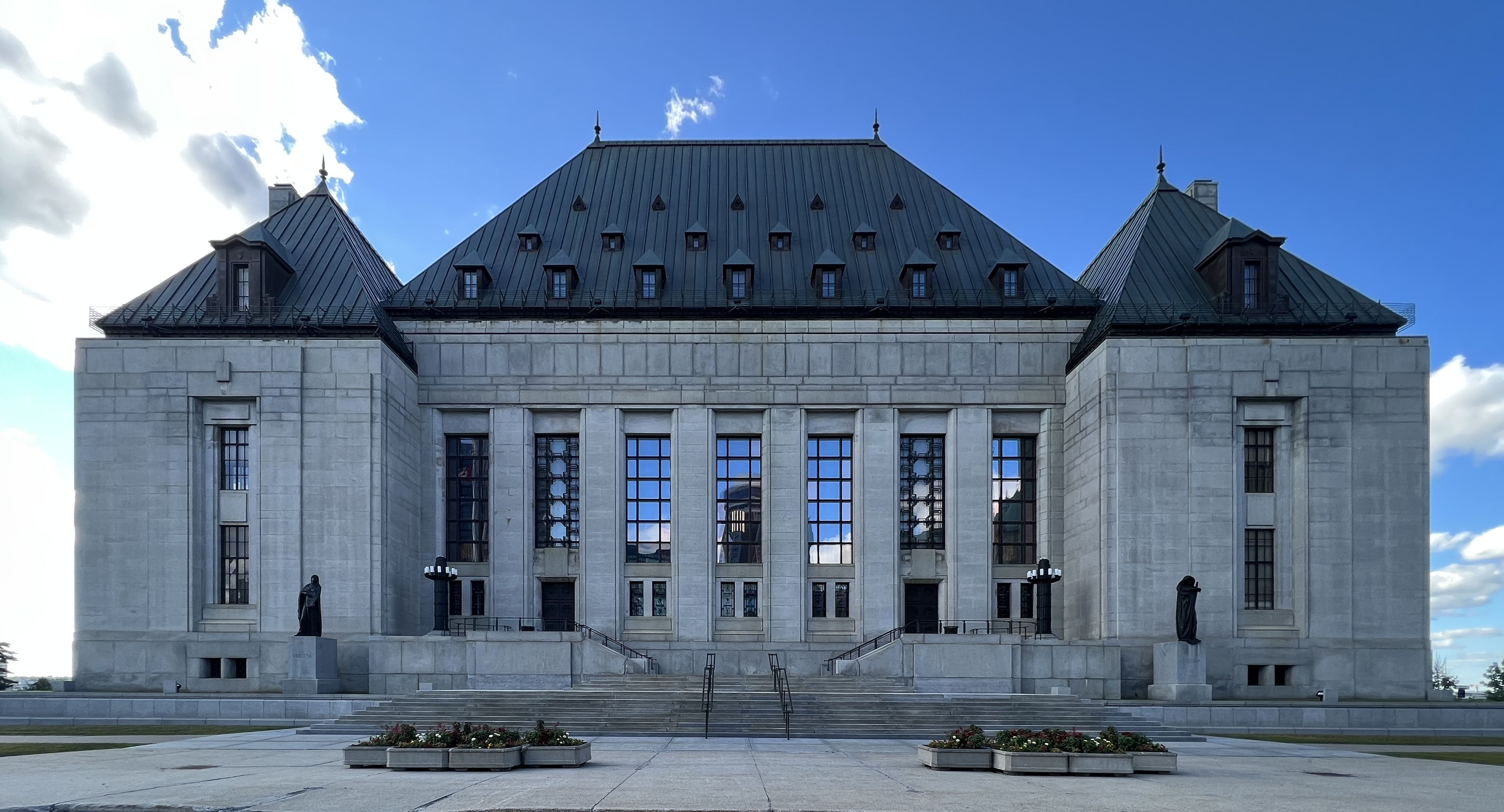

Extinguishment of Aboriginal title refers to the permanent elimination of Indigenous land rights through a deliberate and explicit act of the Crown. For most of Canada’s legal history, extinguishment was considered legally possible under certain conditions, but only through clear federal legislative acts. Courts have consistently held that extinguishment requires a “clear and plain intention” and cannot be inferred from broad or general government actions. Since the enactment of section 35 of the Constitution Act, 1982 on 17 April 1982, extinguishment is no longer permitted, and any government interference with Aboriginal rights must instead be justified as an infringement.

== Legal definition of Aboriginal title ==
Aboriginal title is a sui generis interest in land based on the occupation and use of territory by Indigenous peoples prior to the assertion of Crown sovereignty. The Supreme Court of Canada has confirmed that Aboriginal title exists independently of Crown recognition and is protected under section 35(1) of the Constitution Act, 1982.

Decisions such as Delgamuukw v British Columbia (1997), R v Marshall; R v Bernard (2005), and Tsilhqot'in Nation v British Columbia (2014) define the scope and content of Aboriginal title. These cases confirm that title confers the right to exclusive use and occupation of land, and includes the ability to choose how land is used, subject to the group’s traditional relationship to the territory. Together, these decisions establish the modern framework for understanding how Aboriginal title functions within section 35.

== Legal definition of extinguishment ==
Extinguishment is the permanent removal of Aboriginal title or specific Aboriginal rights through clear federal legislation. Only Parliament possessed the authority to unilaterally extinguish Aboriginal rights before 1982, and this limitation on provincial power was confirmed in Delgamuukw v. British Columbia.

Courts have consistently held that extinguishment must be deliberate and show a “clear and plain intention” to eliminate the right. Legislation does not need to use the term “extinguish,” but its purpose must be fundamentally incompatible with the continued existence of the right. Regulation alone does not extinguish rights, even when broad or inconsistent with traditional practices.

== Historical context ==
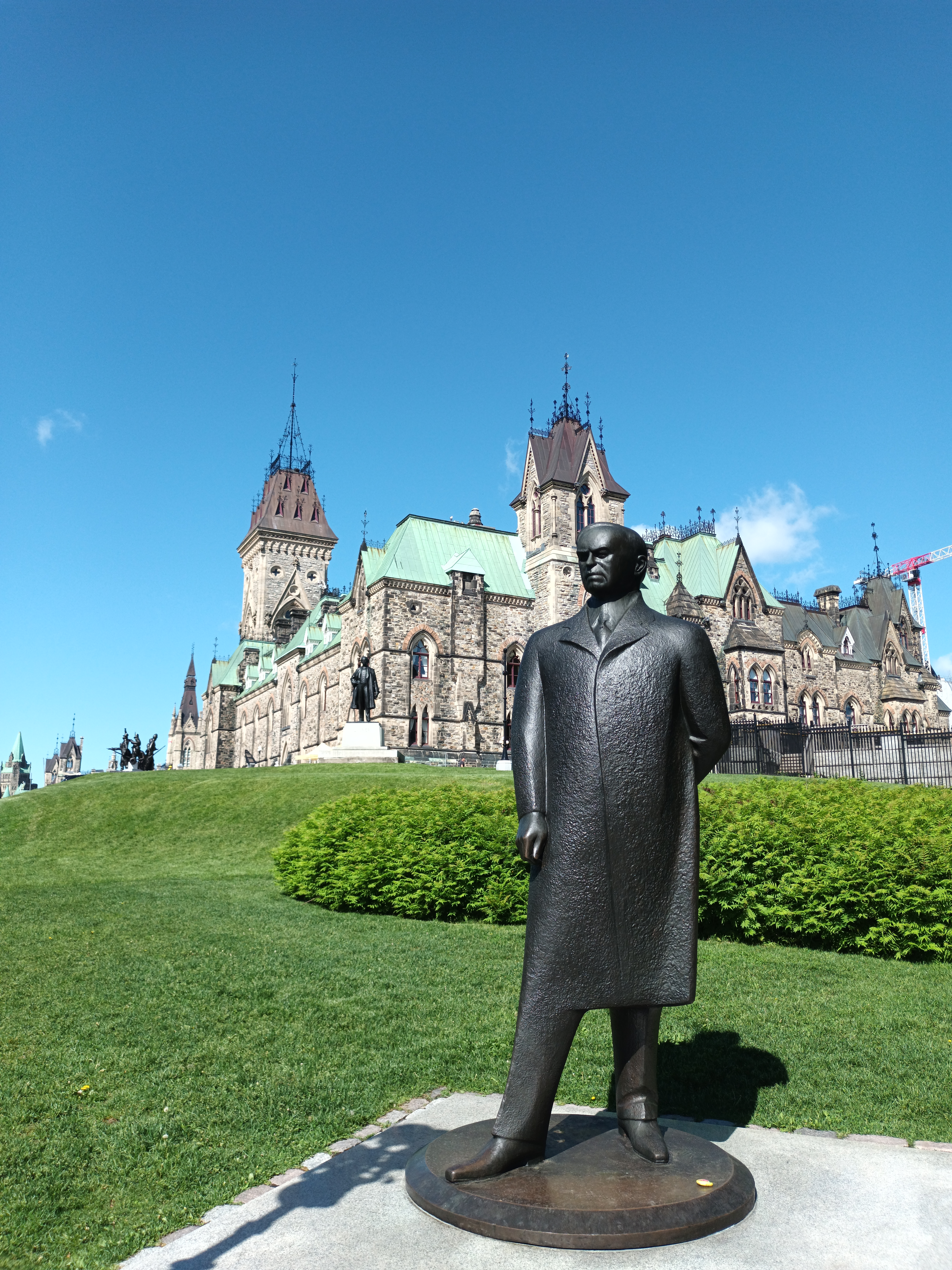

Historically, governments often assumed that Indigenous land rights could be eliminated through settlement, Crown grants, or broad colonial laws. Modern jurisprudence has rejected these assumptions. For example, Delgamuukw v. British Columbia held that neither colonial land laws nor early provincial legislation in British Columbia extinguished Aboriginal title because neither demonstrated the required clear and plain intention. Tsilhqot’in Nation v. British Columbia confirmed the same principle, finding that decades of forestry licensing and land management did not extinguish title.

Over time, federal policy moved away from extinguishment. Modern treaty processes avoid surrender or extinguishment clauses and instead focus on reconciliation. As a result, contemporary claims rarely involve extinguishment as an active government policy and instead examine whether extinguishment may have occurred during the pre-1982 historical period.

== Legal test for extinguishment ==
The test for extinguishment requires “clear and plain intention” from the federal Crown. This standard originates in Calder v British Columbia (AG) (1973) and was refined in later cases such as Delgamuukw v. British Columbia and Tsilhqot’in Nation v. British Columbia. Courts require strict proof that Parliament intended to eliminate the right, and any ambiguity is interpreted in favour of Indigenous peoples.

The intention to extinguish can arise either from express statutory language or, in rare cases, by necessary implication. The Newfoundland and Labrador Court of Appeal has recognized that necessary implication may satisfy the test, but only where the purpose of the legislation is fundamentally incompatible with the continued existence of the Aboriginal right.

A key dividing line in extinguishment law is 17 April 1982. Before that date, Parliament could extinguish Aboriginal rights if it met the legal test. After that date, extinguishment is no longer possible. In R. v. Sparrow (1990), the Supreme Court held that section 35 protects existing Aboriginal rights and that government action post-1982 must be analyzed as a potential infringement, not an extinguishment.

== Application of extinguishment in Canadian law ==
Extinguishment is now raised almost exclusively in historical claims. In Delgamuukw v. British Columbia and Tsilhqot’in Nation v. British Columbia, the Supreme Court rejected claims that colonial actions, land grants, or regulatory schemes had extinguished title due to the absence of clear and plain intention. Newfoundland provides another example: although officials once assumed that Aboriginal rights in the region had been extinguished, modern analysis shows that no legislation meets the required standard.

A recent illustration is Giesbrecht v. British Columbia (2018 BCSC 822). The defendant argued that grants of fee simple issued before 1982 had extinguished any Aboriginal title that might have existed. The First Nation sought to strike the defence, claiming it was bound to fail. The Court disagreed and held that extinguishment remains a valid legal defence when the conduct occurred before 1982. While the Court made no finding on whether extinguishment actually occurred, it confirmed that such arguments cannot be dismissed at a preliminary stage. The decision also noted that the question of whether Aboriginal title can coexist with fee simple ownership remains unsettled.
