= Daniels v Canada (Indian Affairs and Northern Development) =

- Supreme Court of Canada

Hearing: 8 October 2015 Judgment: 14 April 2016
- Full case name: Harry Daniels, Gabriel Daniels, Leah Gardner, Terry Joudrey and Congress of Aboriginal Peoples v Her Majesty the Queen as represented by the Minister of Indian Affairs and Northern Development and Attorney General of Canada
- Citations: 2016 SCC 12
- Docket No.: 35945
- Prior history: APPEAL and CROSS‑APPEAL from Canada (Indian Affairs) v Daniels, 2014 FCA 101, [2014] 4 FCR 97 (17 April 2014), setting aside in part Daniels v Canada 2013 FC 6, [2013] 2 FCR 268 (8 January 2013)
- Ruling: Appeal allowed in part and cross‑appeal dismissed.

Holding
- "Indians" under s. 91(24) of the Constitution Act, 1867 is a broad term referring to all Indigenous peoples in Canada.

Court membership
- Chief Justice: Beverley McLachlin; Puisne Justices: Rosalie Abella, Thomas Cromwell, Michael Moldaver, Andromache Karakatsanis, Richard Wagner, Clément Gascon, Suzanne Côté, Russell Brown

Reasons given
- Unanimous reasons by: Abella J

Daniels v Canada (Indian Affairs and Northern Development) [2016] S.C.R., 2016 SCC 12 is a case of the Supreme Court of Canada, which ruled that Métis and non-status Indians are "Indians" for the purpose of s 91(24) of the Constitution Act, 1867.

== Parties ==
The plaintiffs were Harry Daniels, a Métis activist from Saskatchewan, who died before the case was heard; his son Gabriel; Leah Gardner, a non-status Indian from Ontario; Terry Joudrey, a non-status Indian from Nova Scotia; and the Congress of Aboriginal Peoples. The defendants were Her Majesty the Queen, as represented by the Minister of Indian Affairs and Northern Development, and the Attorney General of Canada.

== Federal Court ==
=== Arguments ===
The plaintiffs asked the court to declare:

1. that Métis and non-status Indians are "Indians" as the term is used in s 91(24) of the Constitution Act, 1867,
2. that the Queen owes a fiduciary duty to them as such,
3. and that they have the right to be consulted by the federal government on a collective basis, respecting their rights, interests and needs as Aboriginal people.

That was based on the facts the Métis had been considered Aboriginals in Rupert's Land and the North-Western Territory, that non-status Indians were those descended from Indians to whom the Indian Act did not apply, and that the government's refusal to recognize those groups meant that they have been discriminated against.

The defendants argued that there were insufficient facts for a declaration to be issued, that Métis had never been considered Indians, and that there was not a group known as "non-status Indians." They denied allegations of discrimination. They claimed that issuing any declaration requested by the plaintiffs would lead only to more litigation.

=== Opinion ===
The Federal Court agreed to the first declaration but dismissed the other two. It determined that such a declaration was along the lines recommended by the Royal Commission on Aboriginal People. It found that the overarching purposes of the Constitution Act, 1867 were settlement, expansion and development of the Dominion; that building a transcontinental railroad was integral to those purposes, that section 91(24) of the Constitution Act, 1867, the power over "Indians," was related to these purposes, that by section 91(24) the Framers of the Constitution Act, 1867 intended to give themselves adequate power to deal with any and all situations involving indigenous people that could frustrate these purposes and accordingly the power over "Indians" at section 91(24) was large enough to deal with all Aboriginal people, including the Métis of the West. The court found support for that interpretation in the fact that Métis had been recognized as "Indians" under the Secretary of State Act, 1868. He agreed that the definition of "Indian" in the Indian Act was narrower than the one found in section 91(24).

=== Appeals ===
On 6 February 2013, the Canadian government appealed the ruling. The appeal was heard on 29–30 October 2013 by the Federal Court of Appeal, with the court upholding the original decision but excluded non-status Indians from its scope. The Supreme Court of Canada heard a subsequent appeal on 8 October 2015 and restored the trial judge's ruling on 14 April 2016.

== Supreme Court ==
In a unanimous decision, the Supreme Court restored the trial judge's declaration on the first issue, as it settled a "live controversy." However, it agreed that there was no "practical utility" in issuing the other declarations, as those questions "would be a restatement of the existing law." It did so because:

- Delgamuukw v British Columbia had already accepted that Canada’s Aboriginal peoples had a fiduciary relationship with the Crown, and Manitoba Metis Federation Inc v Canada (AG) accepted that such a relationship exists between the Crown and Métis.
- Haida Nation v British Columbia (Minister of Forests), Tsilhqot'in Nation v British Columbia and R v Powley already recognized a context-specific duty to negotiate when Aboriginal rights are engaged.

The fact that federal jurisdiction exists in the matter does not necessarily invalidate any provincial legislation, as the Supreme Court had held in Canadian Western Bank v Alberta that it "favour[s], where possible, the ordinary operation of statutes enacted by both levels of government."

=== Impact ===
The Supreme Court's characterization of Métis as being equivalent to "Métis-as-mixed" appeared to represent a reversal of its ruling in Powley. That may lead to the recognition of 200,000 recognized as Métis, a further 200,000 who identify themselves as such, and 200,000 Indians who live off-reserve. It might also be viewed as an incentive for Indians to move off-reserve, in order to earn higher incomes and thus encourage a brain drain that could undermine the economic viability of the reserves.

== See also ==
- List of Supreme Court of Canada cases (McLachlin Court)
