= Indigenous land claims in Canada =

Political issue

Indigenous peoples in Canada demand to have their land rights and their Aboriginal titles respected by the Canadian government. These outstanding land claims are some of the main political issues facing Indigenous peoples today.

The Government of Canada started recognizing Indigenous land claims in 1973. Federal policy divided the claims in two categories: comprehensive claims and specific claims. Comprehensive claims deal with Indigenous rights of Métis, First Nations and Inuit communities that did not sign treaties with the Government of Canada. Specific claims, on the other hand, are filed by First Nations communities over Canada's breach of the Numbered Treaties, the Indian Act or any other agreements between the Crown and First Nations.

== Comprehensive claims ==
Comprehensive claims are assertions of Aboriginal title by Indigenous groups over their ancestral lands and territories. Following the 1973 Calder decision, in which the existence of Aboriginal title was first recognized in Canadian courts, the Canadian government implemented the Comprehensive Land Claim Policy. It is through this process that claims are now negotiated, with the goal of signing a modern treaty which asserts Canadian sovereignty over unceded indigenous lands.

The first comprehensive land claim was the James Bay and Northern Quebec Agreement of 1975 which was signed by the Inuit of Nunavik, the Cree of Eeyou Istchee, the Québec government, and federal government in response to the James Bay hydroelectric project. As of 2017, a total of 25 modern treaties have been signed, and 140 Indigenous groups are in the process of negotiating a comprehensive claim with the federal government.

== Specific claims ==
Specific claims are longstanding land claims disputes pertaining to Canada's legal obligations to indigenous communities. They are related to the administration of lands and other First Nations assets by the Government of Canada, or breaches of treaty obligations or of any other agreements between First Nations and the Crown by the government of Canada. They can also involve mismanagement or abuse of power of Indigenous lands or assets by the Crown under the Indian Act. They are based on lawful obligations of the Crown toward the First Nations. First Nations cannot use Aboriginal titles or punitive damages as the basis of their claims.

The government of Canada typically resolves specific claims by negotiating a monetary compensation for the breach with the band government, and in exchange, they require the extinguishment of the First Nation's rights to the land in question.

== Canadian political parties ==
When discussing the Canadian political parties ideologies in terms of their ideas for improvement within respect to land claims the Liberal Party of Canada believes that social transformations are not the way to effectively produce “entrepreneurial-subjects” due to the undermining of both Indigenous sovereignty and democracy but rather by offering alternative methods of re-acquiring land such as Self-government agreements, bilateral agreements, and the First Nations Land Management Act.

When the Conservative Party of Canada was in Government in 2012 they exhibited their support of Indigenous issues by introducing a new bill that allowed Indigenous Canadians to acquire land claims more easily in an effort to support their businesses, families, etc. This bill was labeled the First Nations Property Ownership Act and was put in place with intent to start the reconciliation process between the Canadian Government and those Indigenous/First Nations people of Canada.

The New Democratic Party of Canada has a number of reconciliation ideas, but when it come to ideas based on land claims and Indigenous rights there is one proposed bill that stands out from the other reconciliation ideas. Acknowledging Pre-Confederate Agreements With Indigenous Peoples bill states that when dealing with government buildings and Indigenous land, development of these buildings must be delayed until the free informed consent of Indigenous Peoples of that land has been given.

When it comes to the Bloc Québecois there is a lack of information on reparations with Indigenous Peoples through land claims. Their focus is more geared towards improving the living conditions, education, and access to essential services.

The Green Party of Canada exhibits their support of Indigenous land claims through supporting Indigenous citizens during protests of the Trans Mountain pipeline which is being pushed through Indigenous land without meaningful consent. By encouraging Indigenous Canadians to repossess their land using territorial disputes, the Green party has added 2.77 per cent of votes when including Indigenous candidates.

== See also ==
- Land Back
- Land claim
- Delgamuukw v British Columbia
- Tsilhqot'in Nation v British Columbia
