= "Rising Tide" Haida Title Lands Agreement =

Haida Title Lands Agreement
Gaayhllxid • Gíihlagalgang "Rising Tide" Haida Title Lands Agreement
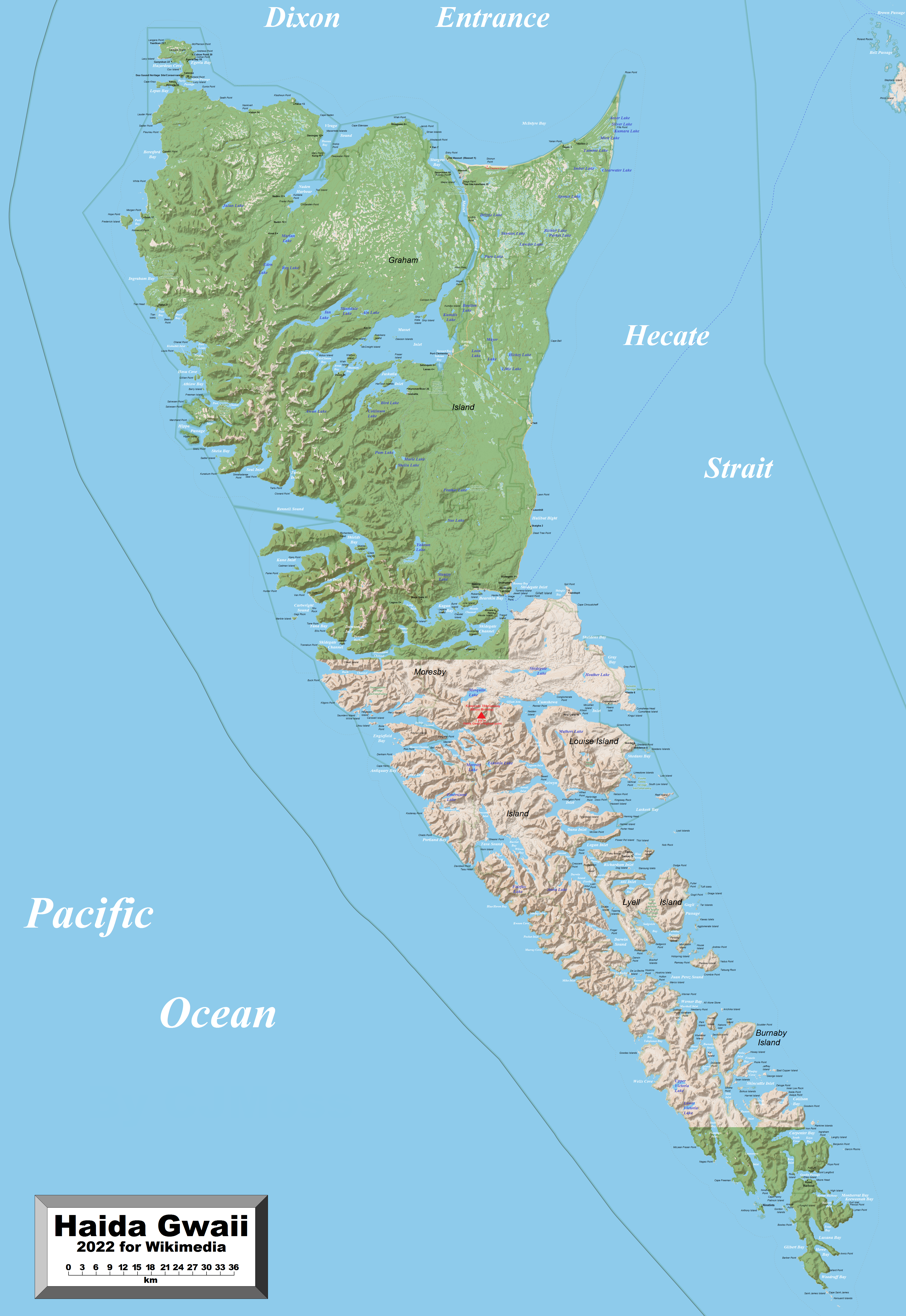
- Map of Haida Gwaii
- Signed: 14 April 2024
- Effective: 5 July 2024
- Condition: After the passage of the Haida Nation Recognition Act [SBC 2023] c. 24
- Signatories: Jason Alsop; Stephen Grosse; (British Columbia) David Eby; (British Columbia) Murray Rankin
- Parties: Haida Nation; British Columbia
- Languages: English; Haida

The "Rising Tide" Haida Title Lands Agreement (Haida: Gaayhllxid / Gíihlagalgang) was signed on 14 April 2024 between the Council of the Haida Nation and the province of British Columbia (BC) to "recognize and affirm" that the Haida Nation holds Aboriginal title over all of Haida Gwaii and surrounding waters. The Haida Nation Recognition Amendment Act, 2024 (Bill 25), was introduced eight days later to implement the Agreement.

The Rising Tide Agreement is one of very few instances where Aboriginal title has been formally recognized. An unprecedented aspect of the Agreement is that it gives the Haida Nation Aboriginal title over privately-owned land that is not government territory. In 2024, BC Premier David Eby said the agreement could provide a template for future negotiations on Aboriginal title in the province.

The Agreement contains a transition process, expected to take several years, during which time British Columbia and the Haida Nation will negotiate laws, fiscal arrangements, and jurisdiction over parks and other government resources.

== Background ==
Aboriginal title is a collective title that confers ownership rights similar to those associated with private land title, including "the right to choose to what uses land can be put". It is affirmed by section 35 of the Constitution Act, 1982. As of April 2024 when the Rising Tide Agreement was signed, Aboriginal title had been judicially declared in only one case: Tsilhqot'in Nation v British Columbia in 2014.

The Haida Nation has claimed title over Haida Gwaii for more than a century. It asserted title in the federal claims process in 1980, and with the BC Treaty Commission in 1992. It took its claim to the courts in 2002, leading to the Supreme Court of Canada ruling in Haida Nation v. British Columbia (Minister of Forests), 2004 SCC73 which set out the government's duty to consult, and suggested that the BC government negotiate.

The province of British Columbia's Declaration on the Rights of Indigenous Peoples Act, passed in 2019, allows the provincial Cabinet to enter into agreements with Indigenous governing bodies, as with the Rising Tide Agreement.

=== Land involved in the agreement ===
Haida Gwaii, is an archipelago of about 150 islands off the northwest coast of British Columbia. It has a landmass of approximately 10,000 square kilometres (3,900 sq mi).

== The agreement ==
=== Objectives of the agreement ===
Haida Nation President Jason Alsop said the Agreement is a "step toward peaceful co-existence" with British Columbia. He said the Nation plans to take control of Haida Gwaii's economy according to Haida values and traditions.

The British Columbia government said recognizing Haida Aboriginal title is a "foundational step in reconciliation for the Haida Nation and the Province". The BC Minister of Indigenous Relations said the province chose to negotiate the agreement since litigation would create uncertainty for residents and businesses.

=== Constitutional entrenchment ===
On 5 September 2025, a BC Supreme court judge agreed to a request by the Haida Nation, British Columbia, and the Canadian federal government to constitutionally entrench Aboriginal title in Haida Gwaii. The constitutional amendment ensures that Aboriginal title cannot be repealed simply by legislation of a future provincial government. The court decision said, in part: "The Haida Nation has Aboriginal title recognized and affirmed under section 35(1) of the Constitution Act 1982 to the terrestrial areas of Haida Gwaii, including any submerged lands underlying freshwater or in the intertidal area between the high and low water marks, extending below the surface".

=== The transition process ===
The Rising Tide Agreement contains a transition process, initially estimated to take two years and extended to several years in 2026. During this time, BC and the Haida Nation are to negotiate laws, fiscal arrangements, and jurisdiction (for example, over parks and other government resources).

British Columbia was in court over a land claim with the Haida Nation when the province decided to negotiate the Rising Tide Agreement, but the court case continues so that any issues that cannot be resolved by negotiation can be settled in court. Haida Nation counsel David Paterson said the usual treaty process aims to reach a final and certain result through a comprehensive agreement, but he does not think there will ever be a final settlement for the Haida Nation, since the Haida approach "assumes an ongoing dynamic relationship between the parties".

=== Fiscal implications for BC ===
On the expenditure side, the agreement is not intended to change the status quo with BC's delivery of provincial public services in Haida Gwaii, including health care, education, transportation, maintenance of public highways, and fire and emergency services. On the revenue side, when the BC government gave the Haida Nation Aboriginal title over Haida Gwaii in 2024, control over the mineral deposits on land and offshore natural gas reserves was transferred to the Haida. It is still to be determine how this will affect the future flow of revenue to the provincial government if, for example, the government no longer has exclusive rights to the mineral royalties on what has become Haida Aboriginal title land.

The Rising Tide Agreement is not expected to delay the Haida civil claim against BC and Canada for issues that have not been resolved through negotiation. Although the Agreement does not explicitly state what has not been resolved, there may be a financial impact for the province since the Haida's civil claim seeks "an accounting of all profits, taxes, stumpage dues, royalties, and other benefits acquired by BC and Canada, or their servants, agents, and contractors, in respect to Haida Gwaii."

=== Implications for parks in Haida Gwaii ===
Jurisdiction over provincial parks (such as Naikoon Provincial Park), protected areas, and ecological reserves (along with other government assets), is to be worked out during the transition period.

Regarding national parks, the September 2025 BC Supreme Court order says that within 24 months, the Haida Nation will receive Aboriginal title over Gwaii Haanas National Park Reserve, National Marine Conservation Area, and Haida Heritage Site.

== Areas of legal uncertainty and public debate ==
=== Private land in Haida Gwaii ===
The Rising Tide Agreements says "The Haida Nation consents to and will honour Fee Simple Interests". A July 2026 letter to Haida Gwaii residents from the President of the Haida Nation and the government of British Columbia says the Agreement "does not change or take away fee simple interests, including private property, whether used for residential, business or industrial purposes. Policies, legislation and regulations pertaining to fee simple interests on Haida Gwaii remain under BC jurisdiction. The Agreement, and the legislation that followed protects the continued ownership and use of private property and does not alter existing private property rights. Providing this certainty for residents was and continues to be a priority".

An unprecedented aspect of the Rising Tide Agreement is that it gives the Haida Nation Aboriginal title over land that has private property title - also called "fee simple" title. (Privately-owned land comprises approximately 2.2% or 220 square kilometres of Haida Gwaii.) This has created legal uncertainty according to lawyer and former chief treaty negotiator for the BC government Thomas Isaac, who says that based on current law, Aboriginal title cannot apply on fee simple, privately-owned lands since Aboriginal title is an exclusive right to land, but fee simple title is also the exclusive right to land. Isaac also notes that the BC government did not have the beneficial interest in the land to give to the Haida because it had already given the beneficial interest to the fee simple title holders.

The Rising Tide Agreement was signed in 2024, and the August 2025 Cowichan Tribes v. Canada ruling prompted University of Saskatchewan constitutional law professor Dwight Newman to say that uncertainty will exist regarding how Aboriginal title and private land title can coexist, pending the appeal of that case. The Cowichan claim related to government-owned land, but the court also granted Aboriginal title to privately-owned land, and ruled that the Cowichan Aboriginal title is superior to fee simple title.

=== Provincial legislation on Aboriginal title ===
Canada's constitution says, in section 91(24), that only the federal government has the power to make laws that relate to Aboriginal issues. The McMillan law firm, among others, note that "there is a legitimate question as to whether a law specifically directed at the recognition and implementation of Aboriginal title would be found unconstitutional if passed only by a provincial legislature."

=== Information on Constitutional entrenchment ===
The Haida Nation issued a press release on the constitutional entrenchment of the Haida Nation's Aboriginal title to Haida Gwaii on 5 September 2025, but the first public confirmation of the entrenchment proceedings came from the BC government on 11 September, at the prompting of reporters. Given the potential importance of the constitutional entrenchment, this added to calls to the province for greater transparency and consultation with non-Haida residents of Haida Gwaii (who represent about half of Haida Gwaii's population of approximately 5000), businesses, and the wider British Columbia population.

== See also ==
- Haida Nation v British Columbia (Minister of Forests)
- Haida people
- Council of the Haida Nation
- Haida Gwaii
