= Indigenous specific land claims in Canada =

Indigenous specific land claims in Canada, also called specific claims, are long-standing land claims made by First Nations against the Government of Canada pertaining to Canada's legal obligations to indigenous communities.

They relate to the administration of land and other First Nation assets by the federal government, as well as to the fulfillment (or lack thereof) of historic treaty obligations and of any other agreements between First Nations and the Crown by the government. For example, this can involve mismanagement of indigenous land or assets by the Crown under the Indian Act. To settle specific claims, the Government of Canada does not take away land from third parties; rather, the government typically resolves specific claims by negotiating a monetary compensation for the breach with the band government, and in exchange, they require the extinguishment of the First Nations' rights to the land in question.

Specific claims are based on lawful obligations of the Crown toward the First Nations, and are separate and distinct from comprehensive land claims or modern treaties. More specifically, First Nations cannot use aboriginal titles or punitive damages as the basis of their claims.

In 2008, an independent judicial body, the Specific Claims Tribunal, was created to give binding decisions to resolve the claims that were not accepted for negotiations, or claims where both parties could not agree on a fair compensation.

The Canadian government started recognizing indigenous specific claims in 1973, whereafter they began negotiating for their settlement. Since then, 1,844 claims have been submitted by First Nation communities. Of these, 935 have been resolved. As of March 2018, 460 claims have been negotiated for settlement by the federal government, while outstanding claims include the 250 that have been accepted for negotiation; the 71 that have come before the Specific Claims Tribunal; and the roughly-160 specific claims that are currently under review or assessment.

== Background ==
Relations between Indigenous peoples and European colonists have been characterized by breaches in the engagements that the colonists made toward the First Nations. The Royal Proclamation of 1763 established that, from that point onward, only the British Crown could engage in treaties or agreements with the First Nations. These agreements include the Peace and Friendship Treaties in the Maritimes; the 11 Numbered Treaties with the First Nations of parts of Ontario, Manitoba, Saskatchewan, Alberta, British Columbia, and the Northwest Territories; and many other regional treaties in southern Ontario and British Columbia.

Despite such agreements, however, the land promised by the treaties were sometimes never allocated. Other times, the Government of Canada made illegal sessions of the land under the Indian Act, or employees at the Department of Indian Affairs fraudulently sold or leased reserve land for their own interests. In other cases, Indigenous groups were inadequately compensated for the sale or damage of reserve lands. The current Indigenous specific claims originate from these outstanding treaty obligations.

== History of specific claims ==
Some First Nations communities started to press their claims from the 19th and early 20th century. However, from 1927 to 1951, prosecuting indigenous land claims in court and using band funds to sue the federal government was prohibited, thereby leaving land claims largely ignored. In 1947, a parliamentary committee recommended that Canada create a "Claims Commission" similar to the Indian Claims Commission in the United States, which was created two years prior in 1945. It was again recommended between 1959 and 1961 that Canada investigate land grievances of First Nations in British Columbia and in Kanesatake, Quebec.

Canada began accepting specific claims for negotiations in 1973. A federal policy created the Office of Native Claims within the Department of Indian and Northern Affairs to negotiate indigenous land claims, which were divided into two categories: comprehensive claims and specific claims. The former deals with the rights of indigenous people to their ancestral lands for traditional use. Specific claim, on the other hand, deal with specific instances of breaches by the government of their obligations toward indigenous communities.

In 1982, nine years after the creation of the Office of Native Claims, only 12 out of the 250 claims filed with the government had been settled. Indigenous communities criticised the fact that the Office was both evaluating and negotiating each claim, thus creating a conflict of interest. They instead called for the negotiation process to be run by an independent body.

In 1992, the Government of Canada created to Office of the Indian Claims Commissioner, whose job was to investigate claims that were refused for negotiations by the Office of Native Claims. However, the Claims Commissioner's powers were limited to issuing non-binding resolutions and thus was ineffective. In their annual reports, Claims Commissioners often suggested the creation of a new independent body to oversee specific claims that could impose binding resolutions on claims where Canada and the First Nations cannot agree on fair compensation. This body came into existence in 2008, with the creation of the Specific Claims Tribunal, where independent jurors assess the claims on a case-by-case basis.

== Specific claims process ==
First Nation communities can start the specific claims process by submitting a claim to the Government of Canada. These claims must meet the minimum standards for specific claims submissions as set out by the Department of Crown–Indigenous Relations and Northern Affairs, or they are immediately rejected and must be filed again. If a claim meets these requirements, it enters a 3-year assessment period, wherein the government determines whether a breach has occurred or not. If the government determines there was no breach, the file is closed, and the first nation may modify their claim and re-submit it, or challenge the government's assessment in the Specific Claims Tribunal.

When the claim is accepted for negotiations, there begins a 3-year timeframe for the negotiation period where the government and the First Nation try to agree on a fair compensation for the breach. The compensation is usually monetary, and does not typically include added land for the reserve. If no agreement is reached, the First Nation may submit their claim to litigation with the Specific Claims Tribunal.

== Ongoing claims ==
Here are examples of a few ongoing specific claims.

=== Atikamekw of Opitciwan ===
The Atikamekw of Opiticiwan filed four distinctive specific claims with the federal government: one related to the losses incurred by the flooding of their village in 1918 due to the construction of the La Loutre Dam and the Gouin Reservoir; one related to the delay in the creation of the reserve; one related to the size of the reserve; and a last one related to the raising of the dam which led to other floods in the 1940s and 1950s.

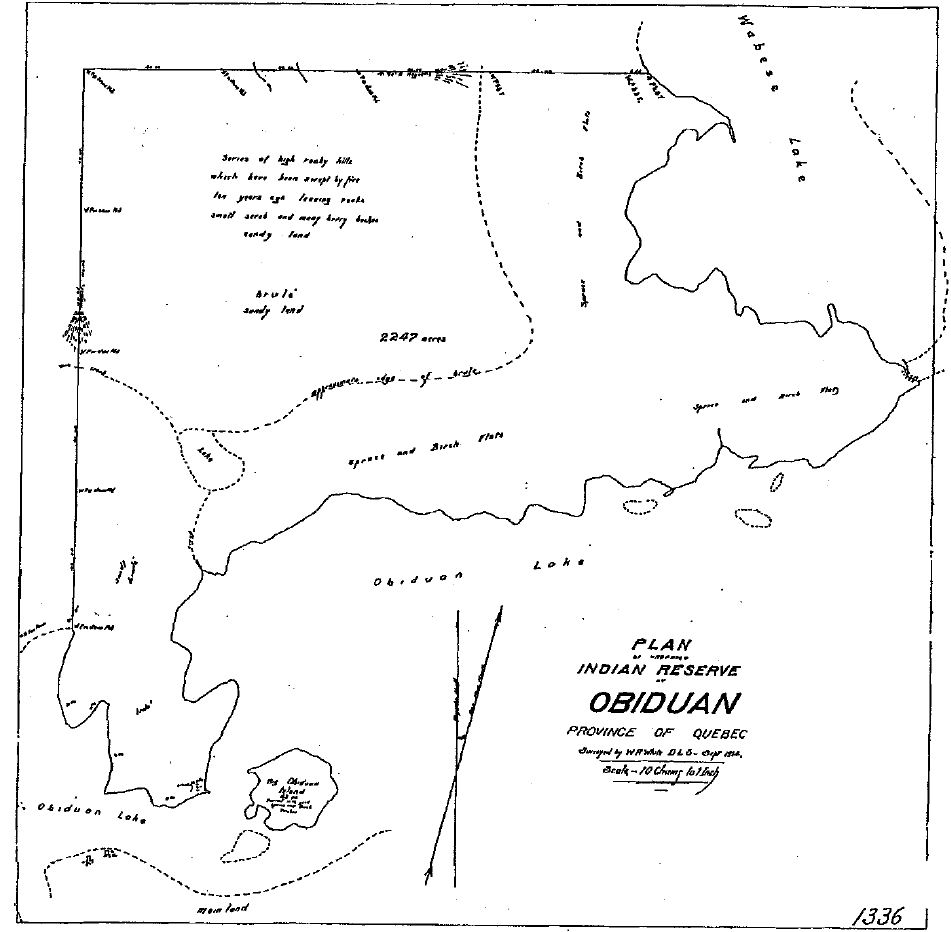
Map of the planned Indian Reserve of Obijuan (Obedjiwan) in 1914

In 1912, Chief Gabriel Awashish and his band of over 150 Atikameks settled on the land of present-day Obeydjiwan, Quebec, on the coast of a lake of the same name. The area was surveyed in 1914 by surveyor Walter Russell White, in preparation for the creation of a reserve in the Area. The band was promised 3,000 acres (12 km^{2}) for this reserve, but White surveyed only 2,290 acres (9.3 km^{2}) of land. In 2016, the Specific Claims Tribunal ruled that the Crown made no serious efforts to give the First Nation the 3000-acre reserve, and therefore should compensate the First nation for the 710 acres (2.9 km^{2}) missing.

In 1918, the end of the construction of the La Loutre Dam resulted in a flooding destroyed the village of Obeydjiwan, including all of the band's houses and possessions. As early as 1912, the federal government knew that the dam would flood the village, yet they did not notify the band. The compensations for these damages was delayed, and the some Atikamekw were not properly compensated, or not at all. The reserve of Obeydjiwan was finally created in 1950. The 1950 reserve was 2,290 acres, and included land outside of the area proposed for the reserve in 1914 to compensate for the land that had been flooded in 1918. In 2016, the Specific Claims tribunal ruled that the delay for the creation of the reserve was too long, which resulted in loss of income from logging for the Atikamekw.

In 2013, Canadian surveyor Éric Groulx testified in front of the Specific Claims Tribunal that surveyor Walter Russell White miscalculated the area of the land that he surveyed in 1914, stating that the land surveyed had an area of 2,760 acres (11.2 km^{2}) as opposed to 2,290 as was previously calculated. This error resulted in further errors when calculating the area of the land that was flooded in 1918, which was used to add land outside of the proposed reserve. The Specific Claims Tribunal therefore ruled that the First Nation was not properly compensated for the land lost in the flooding.

=== Kanesatake ===
The Kanesatake land claim is one of the most politicized land claims in Canada, in parts because of its significance during the Oka Crisis.

The claim originates from the original establishment of the Sulpician mission on the shore of Lac des Deux-Montagnes, where land was set aside for the Mohawks to settle in 1717. However, in 1721, King Louis XV of France granted the Seigneurie des Deux-Montagnes exclusively to the Sulpicians, giving them the legal title to the land. In the 19th century, the Mohawks of Kanesatake started protesting that the Sulpicians were mistreating them to the British authorities. They then discovered that the land they had lived on for over 150 years and they thought they owned was, in fact, not theirs, and started pressing their claim with the federal government. The case went to Supreme Court of Canada in 1910, which ruled that the Sulpicians held the titles to the land. In 1956, the Government of Canada purchased 6 km^{2} (1,500 acres) of the land previously owned by the Sulpicians for the Mohawks to live on, but did not grant this land reserve status.

In 1975, the Mohawk Council submitted a comprehensive land claims asserting Aboriginal title to lands along the St. Lawrence River, the Ottawa River and Lac des Deux-Montagnes, a claim which was rejected by the federal government. In 1977, the Mohawk council of Kanesatake filed a specific claim regarding the former seigneurie. The claim was rejected the nine years later because it failed to meet key legal criteria. In 2002, the government passed Bill S-24, which established that the relation the government of Canada had with Kanesatake was akin to relations it has with bands with a reserve.

In 2008, the government of Canada accepted to negotiate the claim of the Mohawks of Kanesatake under the specific claims policy for a second time. Former Assistant Deputy Minister Fred Caron was nominated as Chief Federal Negotiator for the file.

== Criticism ==
The Specific Claims process has long been criticized by First Nations for multiple reasons, including the conflict of interest inherent in the federal government both assessing the claim and negotiating them, the slowness of the assessment process and the specific claims process in general, the impossibility of receiving land as compensation, the lack of transparency in Specific Claims funds allocations and the requirement to cede and surrender the land in order to get a compensation for it. The Assembly of First Nations (AFN) praised the creation of the Specific Claims Tribunal in 2008, that addressed some of these problems, but that many of the problems of the Specific Claims Policy were still left unsolved, especially regarding the extinguishment of indigenous rights.

In 2018, the Fraser Institute published a report by political scientist Tom Flanagan which concluded that first nation communities that received a compensation following the settlement of a specific claim did not score better on the Well-Being Index of First Nations than those who didn't. He argues that specific claims were essentially a multi-billion-dollar liability for the government, while statistical evidence showed no positive impact to settling these claims. Flanagan also criticized changes made over the years to the specific claims policy to make it more accommodating to the First Nations, which he blames for creating ever-growing backlog of claims being filed every year. In order to settle all of the specific claims one and for all, Flanagan suggests the implementation of a deadline after which First Nations will no longer be able to file new specific claims. This would be akin to the United States' Indian Claims Commission's 10-year period to file claims, which allowed it to settle all of their indigenous land claims in under 40 years.

In response to Flanagan's report, lawyers Alisa Lombard and Aubrey Charette published an opinion piece in which they said that the intent of Specific Claims is to bring justice to defrauded First Nation communities, and is not a welfare program. Therefore, comparing the First Nation communities who settled a specific claim with those who did not using the Well-Being Index is irrelevant to what the Specific Claims process is trying to accomplish.

A 2018 report by the British Columbia Specific Claims Working Group came to the conclusion that the federal government failed to comply by their legal obligation to assess claims in a 3 years period over 65% of the time. On average, the government finishes assessing the claims 5 months after the legislated deadline. In an open letter to Crown-Indigenous Relations minister Carolyn Bennett, the Union of British Columbia Indian Chiefs stated that this "[n]on-compliance with legislation enacted to protect the rights of Indigenous Peoples...contradicts every public commitment your government has made regarding reconciliation." Stephan Matiation, director of the Specific Claims Branch at Crown-Indigenous Relations and Northern Affairs Canada, responded that his team is understaffed, which causes delays in the assessment of claims.

== See also ==
- R v Marshall
