= Barbara M. Young =

Canadian judge

The Honourable Barbara M. Young KC

Puisne Justice of the Supreme Court of British Columbia
- Incumbent
- Assumed office June 26, 2015
- Nominated by: Stephen Harper (Note: On the recommendation of Minister of Justice Peter MacKay.)
- Appointed by: David Johnston
- District: Victoria

Personal details
- Education: University of Calgary

Barbara M. Young is a judge on the Supreme Court of British Columbia.

Barbara Young studied law at the University of Calgary, graduating with an LL.B. in 1985. She was admitted to the Bar of British Columbia in 1986, practiced primarily in family law, personal injury and bankruptcy in Vancouver and was appointed the Queen's Counsel in 2005. She was appointed to the Supreme Court of British Columbia on June 19, 2015.

Young became a certified family mediator in 1996 and was admitted to the child protection mediation roster in 2003. She was appointed Queen’s counsel (QC) in January 2006.

Young was the sitting judge on the Cowichan Tribes v. Canada case in 2025. On August 7, 2025, she ruled that the Cowichan Tribes had established Aboriginal title to approximately 750 acres in the city of Richmond, British Columbia.
