= WBI =

WBI may refer to:

- Web-Based Instruction
- Well-Being Index
- Whole bowel irrigation
- Women's Basketball Invitational
- World Bank Institute
- WBI, a former WB 100+ station, located in Terre Haute, Indiana
