= Grassy Narrows First Nation v Ontario (Natural Resources) =

Supreme Court of Canada 2014 Aboriginal law case

- Supreme Court of Canada

Hearing: May 15, 2014 Judgment: July 11, 2014
- Full case name: Full-case name (Note: Andrew Keewatin Jr. and Joseph William Fobister, on their own behalf and on behalf of all other members of Grassy Narrows First Nation, Appellants and Minister of Natural Resources, Resolute FP Canada Inc. (formerly Abitibi-Consolidated Inc.), Attorney General of Canada and Goldcorp Inc. Respondents And Between: Leslie Cameron, on his own behalf and on behalf of all other members of Wabauskang First Nation Appellant and Minister of Natural Resources, Resolute Forest Products (formerly Abitibi-Consolidated Inc.), Attorney General of Canada and Goldcorp Inc. Respondents - and - Attorney General of Manitoba, Attorney General of British Columbia, Attorney General of Saskatchewan, Attorney General of Alberta, Grand Council of Treaty 3, Blood Tribe, Beaver Lake Cree Nation, Ermineskin Cree Nation, Siksika Nation, Whitefish Lake First Nation # 128, Fort McKay First Nation, [[Te'mexw Treaty Association[]], Niisaachewan Anishinaabe Nation, Ojibways of Onigaming First Nation, Big Grassy First Nation and Naotkamegwanning First Nation, Métis Nation of Ontario, Cowichan Tribes, represented by Chief William Charles Seymour, on his own behalf and on behalf of the members of Cowichan Tribes, Lac Seul First Nation, Sandy Lake First Nation and Assembly of First Nations/National Indian Brotherhood as Interveners.)
- Citations: 2014 SCC 48, [2014] 2 SCR 447
- Prior history: Judgment for the Grassy Narrows First Nation.
- Ruling: Appeal by Ontario was denied

Holding
- Based on article 1 of an 1891 agreement, the SCC found that the "disputed territory belonged to Ontario".

Court membership
- Chief Justice: Beverley McLachlin; Puisne Justices: Louis LeBel, Rosalie Abella, Marshall Rothstein, Thomas Cromwell, Michael Moldaver, Andromache Karakatsanis, Richard Wagner

Reasons given
- Unanimous reasons by: yes

Grassy Narrows First Nation v Ontario (Natural Resources) 2014 SCC 48, [2014] 2 S.C.R. 447 was a July 11, 2014 decision by the Supreme Court of Canada in case number 35379 in which an appeal made by the Government of Ontario was allowed. The result of Grassy Narrows v. Ontario, while legal, was deemed unfair by some to Grassy Narrows First Nation, as "it has put them in a situation of having negotiated with a party who then ceased to be a party when it came to honouring the agreement."

== Overview ==
The Supreme Court justices Beverley McLachlin, Louis LeBel, Rosalie Silberman Abella, Marshall Rothstein, Thomas Albert Cromwell, Michael J. Moldaver, and Richard Wagner "unanimously determined that Ontario has jurisdiction to take up land covered by the Ontario Boundaries Extension Act—land also covered under the 1873 Treaty 3—thus "limiting First Nation harvesting rights."

== Background ==
In Grassy Narrows v Ontario the SCC "unanimously determined that Ontario has the jurisdiction under the Crown to take up Treaty No. 3 (1873) (“Treaty 3”), thus limiting First Nation harvesting rights."

The Ojibway had yielded ownership of their territory to Canada, through the signing in 1873 of Treaty 3. Treaty 3 gave the Ojibway the "right to harvest the non-reserve lands that they had yielded in exchange until such lands were "taken up" for settlement, industry, or other government purposes."

In 1912, the land, which is now known as the Keewatin, was annexed to the province of Ontario.

In 1997, the Government of Ontario issued a forestry licence for clear-cutting to Abitibi-Consolidated Inc. In 2007, Abitibi-Consolidated Inc. merged with Bowater and became the third largest pulp and paper company in North America, and the eighth largest in the world. On July 1, 2012 the company, headquartered in Montreal, Quebec, changed its name to Resolute Forest Products, with its French name Produits forestiers Résolu.

In 2005, Grassy Narrows filed a legal challenge to the Ontario license granted to Abitibi-Consolidated in an "effort to stop the logging", which initially succeeded. The Ontario Court of Appeal overturned this ruling saying that "s. 109 of the Constitution Act, 1867 provides Ontario with ownership of crown lands in Ontario." The court found that Ontario also has provincial jurisdiction in natural resources and was therefore "entitled to sell the land". The SCC upheld this ruling.

== Reasoning ==
The SCC reasoned in their July 11, 2014 decision on Grassy Narrows v. Ontario, that Treaty 3 represented a "historical border dispute between Canada and Ontario over Ontario's northern and western boundaries". Based on article 1 of an 1891 agreement, the SCC found that the "disputed territory belonged to Ontario".

"the rights of hunting and fishing by the Indians throughout the tract surrendered, not including the reserves to be made thereunder, do not continue with reference to any tracts which have been, or from time to time may be, required or taken up for settlement, mining, lumbering or other purposes by the Government of Ontario" Schedule to 1891 Legislation (U.K.)

== Aftermath ==
The result of Grassy Narrows v. Ontario, was deemed unfair to Grassy Narrows by some, as "it has put them in a situation of having negotiated with a party who then ceased to be a party when it came to honouring the agreement." John Wilson said in is comments on the June 26, 2014 SCC decision in Tsilhqot'in Nation v British Columbia that "rights can be justifiably limited only if they would serve purposes of reconciliation." which was not the case in the Grassy Narrows decision. In spite of SCC decision, the Grassy Narrows First Nation continue to be "determined to protect the land from development". In 2015, they reaffirmed their "determination to continue blockades" and their "political fight".

== See also ==
- Grassy Narrows road blockade
- R v Sparrow
- Calder v British Columbia (AG) (1971)
- Guerin v The Queen (1984)
- Delgamuukw v British Columbia (1997)
- Tsilhqot'in Nation v British Columbia (2014)
