= Declaration on the Rights of Indigenous Peoples Act (British Columbia) =

Statute of the Canadian province of British Columbia

Legislative Assembly of British Columbia
- Citation: S.B.C. 2019, c. 44
- Royal assent: November 28, 2019

Legislative history
- Bill title: Bill 41
- Introduced by: Scott Fraser
- Introduced: 24 October 2019
- Status: In force

The Declaration on the Rights of Indigenous Peoples Act (DRIPA) is a statute of the province of British Columbia, Canada. Enacted in 2019, it establishes a legal commitment to uphold the principles of the United Nations Declaration on the Rights of Indigenous Peoples (UNDRIP) in provincial law and policy.

The Act makes British Columbia the first jurisdiction in Canada to legislate the implementation of UNDRIP, and forms a central component of the province's approach to reconciliation with Indigenous peoples. It has become the subject of political controversy in British Columbia due to the legal uncertainty resulting from its implementation, including potential impacts on governance, private property rights, and economic development.

== Background ==
The Act was introduced by Minister of Indigenous Relations and Reconciliation Scott Fraser under the New Democratic Party government of Premier John Horgan. It was passed unanimously by the Legislative Assembly of British Columbia in November 2019. The legislation was conceived in response to advocacy from the Truth and Reconciliation Commission of Canada to adopt and implement UNDRIP as the framework for reconciliation.

== Provisions ==
DRIPA mandates the British Columbia government to bring its laws in line with UNDRIP. UNDRIP states that free, prior, and informed consent from Indigenous Peoples is required on matters affecting their rights, lands, territories, and resources. The province states that DRIPA does not grant First Nations a veto over resource development, although promises "redress and restitution" when consent is not granted.

Key provisions include:

- Section 3 requires the government to take all necessary measures to ensure provincial laws are consistent with UNDRIP, in consultation and cooperation with Indigenous peoples.
- Section 4 mandates the development and implementation of an action plan, created jointly with Indigenous peoples, to achieve the objectives of the declaration.
- Section 5 requires the government to report annually on progress toward aligning laws and implementing the action plan.
- Sections 6 and 7 allow the provincial cabinet (Executive Council), on behalf of the government, to negotiate and enter into agreements with Indigenous governing bodies. Section 6 agreements are broader in nature.

== Implementation ==
When the legislation was passed in 2019, Minister Fraser told fellow MLAs that the act was intended as aspirational and to provide guidance. The government said that the process of bringing its laws into alignment with UNDRIP would take decades. In March 2022, the Government of British Columbia released an action plan outlining 89 priority actions to be undertaken over five years, organized around themes including self-determination and Indigenous governance. To support implementation, the province established the Declaration Act Secretariat in 2022, a central agency responsible for coordinating the alignment of laws and policy across government.

== Reception ==
The Act was praised by Indigenous advocacy groups upon passage, while critics argued it was unnecessary thanks to existing laws and did not effectively protect the rights of non-Indigenous third-party interests.

== Land-use decision-making powers granted to Indigenous bodies under DRIPA ==
An important aspect of DRIPA is that it allows the province to transfer land-use decision-making powers to indigenous governing bodies. Early examples are agreements with the Tahltan and shíshálh First Nations. Other examples include a transfer to the 'Namgis First Nation of a large area of forest land on Vancouver Island; an agreement with the Tsilhqot'in in B.C.'s central interior concerning environmental assessment of mining projects; and the government is working on a land claim by the Kaska Dena to a region representing about 10% of B.C.'s total area.

=== Tahltan decision-making agreements and proposals ===
In June 2022, the first agreement under DRIPA was made with the Tahltan Central Government. The agreement "honours Tahltan's jurisdiction in land-management decisions in Tahltan Territory", where the territory comprises a substantial 95,933 square kilometres in northwest B.C., equivalent to 11% of B.C.'s land area. Most of the province's land base is subject to Indigenous land claims, and Premier John Horgan said the agreement aimed to reduce uncertainty for investors regarding environmental and land-use decisions. Two further agreements were signed with the Tahltan in 2023 and 2026 under Section 7 of DRIPA regarding decisions under the Environmental Assessment Act relating to the Red Chris and Eskay Creek mines. These agreements mean the projects require consent of the Tahltan to proceed, and do not limit the terms under which consent can be withheld. This may increase uncertainty for the project's proponent, and could reduce the predictability that the B.C. government argues will come with the agreements.

Each First Nation's land-use agreement is unique, so industry stakeholders have expressed concern that there could be inconsistent land-use processes and decisions when a project overlaps two First Nation claim areas. Also, under the planned Tahltan-BC Land Stewardship Planning Project (which covers 58,011 square kilometres of the Tahltan Territory), an investor in a new or existing project may have rules changed or tenure ended, leading to economic losses. The President of the Independent Contractors and Businesses Association of B.C. says this risks making B.C. "un-investable". Another concern is that the provincial government has granted exclusive decision-making power to the Tahltan over publicly-owned land in a large and mineral-rich region of B.C. based on a claim of Aboriginal title, when Aboriginal title has not been established under Canadian law.

=== shíshálh decision-making agreements and proposals ===
In 2022 the province began a process to negotiate an arrangement with the shíshálh (Sechelt) under Section 7 of DRIPA to manage dock leases and licences in an area along the Sunshine Coast, 50 kilometres northwest of Vancouver. This generated concern among owners of private and commercial docks and boathouses, and in the summer of 2024, the government announced a resolution that effectively shields existing facilities from new rules imposed by the First Nation. On January 29, 2025 the B.C. government publicly announced a wider agreement that it had signed on August 16, 2024 to settle Aboriginal title with the shíshálh Nation over more than half a million hectares of the Sechelt Peninsula. The agreement also proposed, within five years, to pay $104 million for economic development and other programs and to reach an arrangement on exclusive decision-making by the shíshálh over matters that were not yet defined.

A group from the agreement area, the Pender Harbour Area Residents Association (PHARA), has filed a lawsuit to have DRIPA struck down, as they would be subject to decisions made by a governing body (the shíshálh Nation) for which they could not vote and which is not accountable to them, saying this violates democratic rights protected under section 3 of Canada's Charter of Rights and Freedoms. Also, PHARA said Aboriginal rights defined in DRIPA and UNDRIP are inconsistent with Aboriginal rights described in Canadian law under section 35 of the Constitution Act, 1982, particularly concerning the need under Canadian law to "reasonably balance" Aboriginal and non-Aboriginal interests regarding asserted but unproven Aboriginal land claims. Additionally, PHARA wants the court to consider whether DRIPA goes beyond B.C.'s legal authority since the federal government holds exclusive jurisdiction of Indigenous rights in Canada, as indicated in sections 91(24) and 92 of the Constitution Act, 1867.

== Major legal cases that reference DRIPA ==
The B.C. Supreme Court referred to DRIPA in its August 2025 decision in Cowichan Tribes v. Canada that granted Aboriginal title to the Cowichan Tribes on 732 acres in the city of Richmond. In a first for Canada, Aboriginal title was established over privately-owned land, and Aboriginal title was declared a "prior and senior right" to private property title, creating uncertainty regarding the status and validity of private land titles.

In December 2025, in a 2–1 decision, the British Columbia Court of Appeal reversed an earlier ruling regarding the Gitxaala lawsuit in Gitxaala v. British Columbia. The lawsuit challenged the province's automated online registry system that allowed prospecting and claims for mineral rights to be registered prior to consultation with the Gitxaala on public land where the Gitxaala had made a claim of Aboriginal title. The court referred to B.C.'s Interpretation Act (a guide to interpreting provincial laws), which was changed in 2021 by then-attorney general David Eby to say "Every act and regulation must be construed as being consistent with" UNDRIP. As the Interpretation Act said "must" be consistent with UNDRIP, the court said "Properly interpreted", DRIPA incorporates UNDRIP into the positive law of British Columbia "with immediate legal effect".

== Proposals for changes to DRIPA ==
Following the Gitxaala and Cowichan decisions, Premier David Eby vowed to appeal the rulings and amend DRIPA to reduce government liability and address legal uncertainty. Since most B.C. laws had not yet been revised, any law that was not aligned with UNDRIP could be challenged so "Too much rides on it in terms of our province's prosperity." A Globe and Mail editorial said amendments to DRIPA and the Interpretation Act would allow legislation to be aligned in an orderly way, since investors face "crippling uncertainty" over what laws govern B.C. Former federal Minister of Justice Jody Wilson-Raybould recommended a separate implementation act for aligning laws, since DRIPA's lack of an effective legislative mechanism regarding how UNDRIP is to be translated into Canadian law had caused "confusion and complexities for the courts".

In April 2026, Premier Eby announced that, although he remained convinced that the legal uncertainty needed to be addressed, he had reversed his decision to amend DRIPA due to opposition from First Nations and from within the NDP caucus, choosing instead to set up a joint working group with the First Nations Leadership Council to "find solutions" by the fall 2026 legislative session.

The opposition Conservative Party of British Columbia has said it would repeal DRIPA. In August 2026, Conservative MLA Harman Bhangu applied for an initiative petition that would repeal DRIPA. If the petition obtains signatures of 10 percent of voters in all 93 of B.C.'s electoral districts by 25 January 2027, the draft bill bill could be referred to the provincial legislature for a vote.

The Conservative Party of British Columbia won the 2026 British Columbia general election. In an interview with Global News following the election, which saw a Conservative majority, Grand Chief Stewart Phillip described any attempt at repealing DRIPA by the government-elect as, "a declaration of war." Phillip's late wife, Joan Phillip, while an MLA for the NDP, had opposed her own party's suggestion to amend the act before she passed away.

== See also ==
- Cowichan Tribes v. Canada
- Indigenous peoples in Canada
- "Rising Tide" Haida Title Lands Agreement
- Truth and Reconciliation Commission of Canada
