= Gitxaała v. British Columbia =

2025 Canadian lawsuit

Gitxaała v. British Columbia (Chief Gold Commissioner) is a 2025 decision of the British Columbia Court of Appeal concerning the province's mineral claim system, British Columbia's Declaration on the Rights of Indigenous Peoples Act, and the legal effect of the United Nations Declaration on the Rights of Indigenous Peoples (UNDRIP) in British Columbia. In a split 2-1 ruling released on December 5, 2025, the court allowed the appeals of the Gitxaała Nation and the Ehattesaht First Nation and held that British Columbia's standing mineral claims regime was inconsistent with Article 32(2) of UNDRIP.

== Case ==
The case challenged British Columbia's former mineral tenure system, under which mineral claims could be registered without prior consultation with affected Indigenous nations. In September 2023, the Supreme Court of British Columbia held that the province had a duty to consult, but did not accept that British Columbia's Declaration Act made UNDRIP directly justiciable in the way argued by the petitioners.

Gitxaała Nation and Ehattesaht First Nation appealed this decision. The appeal was heard in January 2025.

On December 5, 2025, the Court of Appeal overturned the lower court on the Declaration Act issue. The majority held that the Declaration Act incorporates UNDRIP into British Columbia law and that related rights may be litigated in court. The court also declared that the province's mineral claims regime was inconsistent with Article 32(2) of UNDRIP.

== Aftermath ==
While the litigation was ongoing, British Columbia developed a new Mineral Claims Consultation Framework, which took effect on March 26, 2025. Under the framework, the province must consult First Nations before registering new mineral claims.

In January 2026, Premier David Eby said the Act would need to be amended in response to the ruling, which he said had created legal uncertainty. First Nations Leadership Council representatives and other Indigenous organizations publicly opposed proposed amendments or suspensions of parts of the Act.

By April 2026, the provincial government said it would not introduce DRIPA legislation during that legislative session.

In February 2026, British Columbia sought leave to appeal the Court of Appeal decision to the Supreme Court of Canada. The Supreme Court granted leave to appeal on May 21, 2026.
