= Gertrude Guerin =

Chief of the Musqueam Indian Band

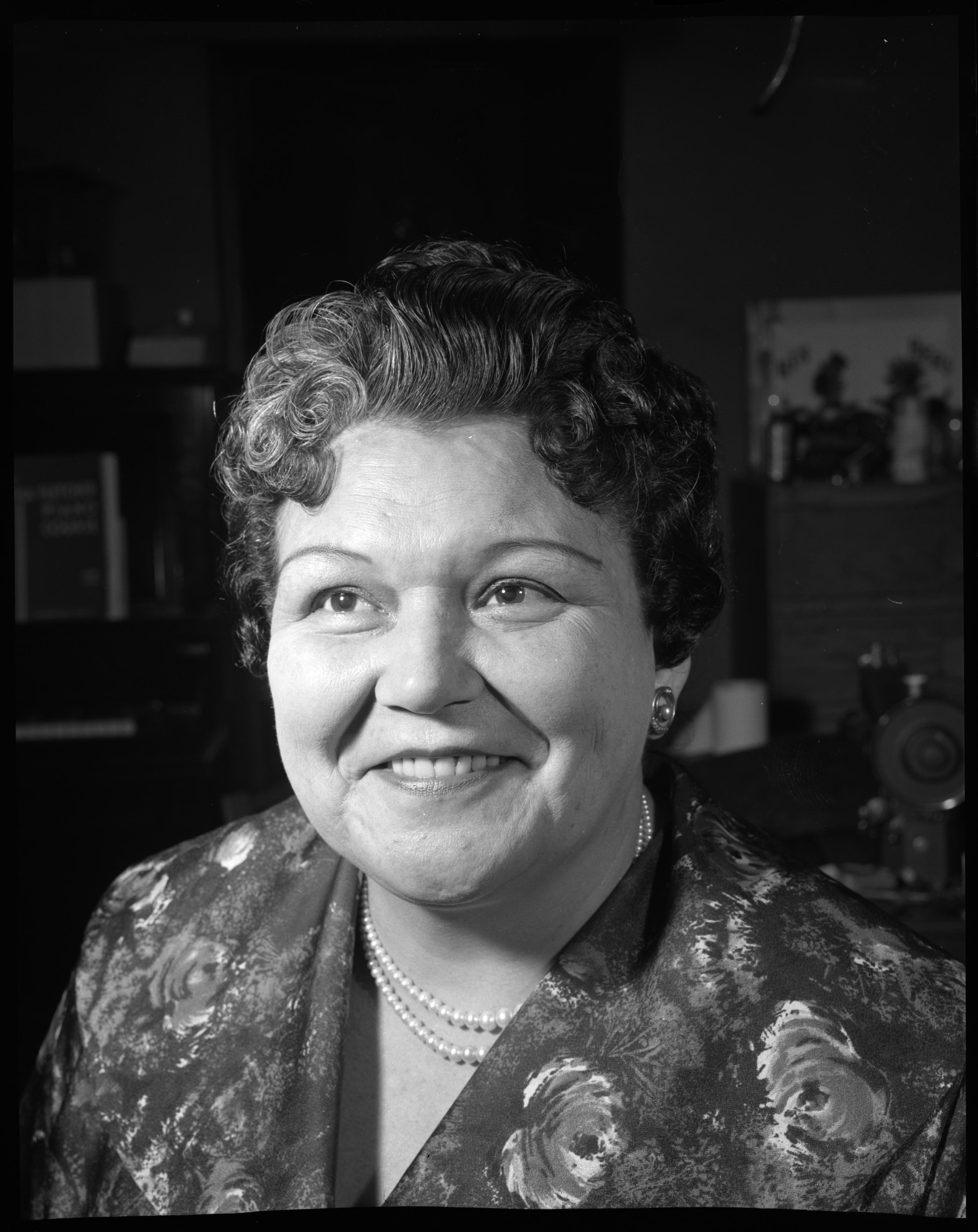
- Guerin in 1961
- Born: March 26, 1917; North of the Fraser River
- Died: January 25, 1998 (aged 80)
- Occupation: Chief of the Musqueam Indian Band

Gertrude Ettershank Guerin or Klaw-law-we-leth (1917 – 1998) was chief of the Musqueam Indian Band in British Columbia, Canada.

== Personal life ==
Gertrude Ettershank was born on 26 March 1917 on the Mission Reserve on the north of the Fraser River, now part of North Vancouver. She was from the Squamish people on her mother's side while her father was of English descent. Her mother died when she was aged 12, and she cared for her younger sister Vivian. She worked in a cannery, where she met Victor Guerin (died 1989), of the Musqueam First Nation. They married in 1936 and had five children. Guerin died 25 January 1998 and is buried alongside her husband in the cemetery on the Musqueam reserve: a plaque commemorates her in the church of St Michael the Archangel.

== Activist and chief ==
In 1953–1954, Guerin and her husband moved to the Musqueam lands, where he worked as a fisherman and longshoreman. She sent her children to the local public school, where they would get a better education than at the residential school, and joined the PTA, becoming its President. She was elected chief of the Musqueam for two years in 1959, the first woman to be an elected chief in Canada.

In 1967, she worked on the establishment of the Native Education Centre, now the Native Education College, to support Vancouver's urban indigenous population.

She was a founding member of the Vancouver Police and Native Liaison Society and, in 1963, founded the Vancouver Friendship Centre, now the Vancouver Aboriginal Friendship Centre Society.

She was among the group of Musqueam people, led by her son Delbert who was then the chief, who challenged the government in the court case R v Guerin (1984), as a result of which the Musqueam were awarded $10 million; the case is considered a landmark in Canadian indigenous rights law. Her son, for whom the case is named, credited her as the inspiration behind the case: "The Guerin case came about because of me listening to her complain, no doubt about it".

== Recognition ==
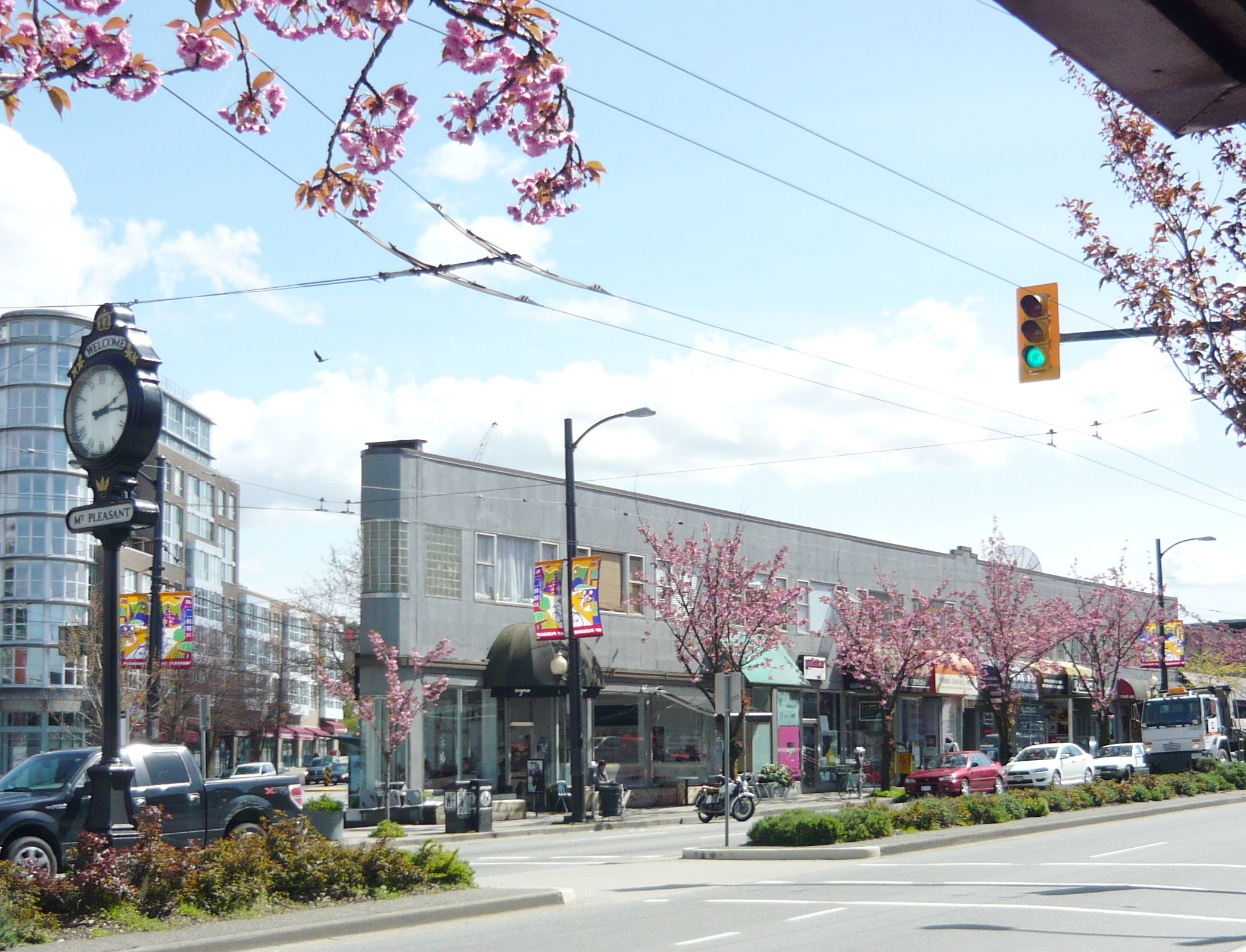
A 2012 view of the area which, in 2018, was renamed "Gertrude Guerin Plaza"

The Native Education College gives a "Visionary Award" in her name, saying that it "recognizes a former NEC Board Member who strives [sic] toward empowering Indigenous people".

In 2006, she was posthumously given the Women's History Month Award for Family and Community by the British Columbia Ministry of Community Services and the Ministry of Aboriginal Relations and Reconciliation for her work on indigenous rights and her contribution to the empowerment of her community.

Gertrude Guerin Plaza in Mount Pleasant, Vancouver, at the junction of Main Street and Kingsway, was named in her honour in 2018.
