= R v Sparrow =

- Supreme Court of Canada

Hearing: November 3, 1988 Judgment: May 31, 1990
- Full case name: Ronald Edward Sparrow v Her Majesty The Queen
- Citations: [1990] 1 S.C.R. 1075, 70 D.L.R. (4th) 385, 4 W.W.R. 410, 56 C.C.C. (3d) 263, 3 C.N.L.R. 160, 46 B.C.L.R. (2d) 1
- Docket No.: 20311
- Prior history: Judgment for the Crown in the Court of Appeal for British Columbia
- Ruling: Appeal and cross appeal dismissed

Holding
- The governments of Canada have a fiduciary relationship with Aboriginals under section 35 of the Constitution Act, 1982; any denial of Aboriginal rights under section 35 must be justified, and Aboriginal rights must be given priority

Court membership
- Chief Justice: Brian Dickson; Puisne Justices: William McIntyre, Antonio Lamer, Bertha Wilson, Gérard La Forest, Claire L'Heureux-Dubé, John Sopinka, Charles Gonthier, Peter Cory

Reasons given
- Unanimous reasons by: Dickson and La Forest

R v Sparrow, [1990] 1 S.C.R. 1075 was an important decision of the Supreme Court of Canada concerning the application of Aboriginal rights under section 35(1) of the Constitution Act, 1982. The Court held that Aboriginal rights, such as fishing, in existence in 1982 are protected under the Constitution of Canada and so they cannot be infringed without justification on account of the government's fiduciary duty to the Aboriginal peoples of Canada.

== Background ==
Ronald Edward Sparrow, a member of the Musqueam Band, was caught fishing with a drift net 45 fathoms (82 m) in length, 20 fathoms (37 m) longer than permitted by the band's fishing licence under the Fisheries Act. Sparrow admitted to all the facts in the charge but justified them on the ground that he was exercising his Aboriginal right to fish under section 35(1) of the Constitution Act, 1982.

At trial, the judge found that section 35 protected only existing treaty rights and that there was no inherent right to fish. An appeal to the County Court was dismissed, and a further appeal to the Court of Appeal was dismissed on the grounds that there was insufficient evidence to maintain the defence.

The issue to the Supreme Court was whether the net length restriction violated s. 35(1).

== Reasons of the court ==
The judgment of a unanimous Supreme Court was given by Chief Justice Brian Dickson and Justice Gérard La Forest. It held that Sparrow was exercising an "inherent" Aboriginal right that existed before the provincial legislation and was guaranteed and protected by section 35 of the Constitution Act, 1982. The Court interpreted each of the words of section 35(1).

=== Sparrow test ===
1. Is the practice, custom, or tradition an existing aboriginal right?
2. If this right has been established, does the impugned limitation constitute a prima facie infringement on that right?
3. If the limitation is a prima facie infringement on the aboriginal right, can the government justify it?

The existence of the aboriginal right to fish was not at serious dispute in this appeal and so the case did not elaborate on how to determine whether a right is an aboriginal right. The case focused instead on whether that right was extinguished, whether that right was infringed, and whether that infringement was justified.

=== "Existing" ===
The word "existing" in section 35(1), the Court said, must be "interpreted flexibly so as to permit their evolution over time." As such, "existing" was interpreted as referring to rights that were not "extinguished" prior to the introduction of the 1982 Constitution. The Court rejected the alternate "frozen" interpretation referring to rights that were being exercised in 1982. As long as the right had not been extinguished, the manner in which the right happened to have been regulated prior to 1982. The existing right is not to be narrowed in interpretation based on regulation.

Based on historical records of the Musqueam fishing practices over the centuries and into colonial times, the Court found that the band had a clear right to fish for food.

Extinguishment of rights can occur only through an act that showed "clear and plain intention" on the government to deny those rights. The Court found that the Crown could not prove that the right to fish for food had been extinguished prior to 1982. The licensing scheme was merely a means of regulating the fisheries, not removing the underlying right, and no historical government policy towards fishing rights amounted to a clear intention to extinguish.

=== "Recognized and Affirmed" ===
The words "recognized and affirmed" incorporate the government's fiduciary duty to the Aboriginal people, which requires it to exercise restraint when it applies its powers in interference with Aboriginal rights. The words further suggest that Aboriginal rights are not absolute and may be encroached upon with sufficient reason.

=== Justification ===
In order to justify a prima facie infringement, the government needs to demonstrate the following (p. 1119):

- a valid legislative objective (including conservation, protection, and management but not a general "public interest" purpose)
- the infringement is minimally impairing
- that the aboriginal group in question has been consulted
- that there has been compensation in the case of expropriation

== Aftermath ==
After the Sparrow case, federal or provincial legislation may limit Aboriginal rights only if it has given them appropriate priority because they have a different nature from other non-Aboriginal rights.

The "Sparrow test" has been used by many experts as a way of measuring how much Canadian legislation may limit Aboriginal rights.

Typical cases of inappropriate priority include distributing hunting licences by lottery.

== See also ==
- The Canadian Crown and First Nations, Inuit and Métis
- Canadian Aboriginal case law
- Numbered Treaties
- Indian Act
- Section Thirty-five of the Constitution Act, 1982
- Indian Health Transfer Policy (Canada)
- Calder v British Columbia (AG) (1971)
- Guerin v The Queen (1984)
- Delgamuukw v British Columbia (1997)
- Tsilhqot'in Nation v British Columbia (2014)
- Grassy Narrows First Nation v. Ontario (Natural Resources) (2014)
