= R v Guerin =

Guerin v The Queen
- Supreme Court of Canada

Hearing: June 13, 14, 1983 Judgment: November 1, 1984
- Full case name: Delbert Guerin, Joseph Becker, Eddie Campbell, Mary Charles, Gertrude Guerin and Gail Sparrow v Her Majesty The Queen
- Citations: [1984] 2 S.C.R. 335
- Ruling: Guerin appeal allowed.

Court membership
- Chief Justice: Bora Laskin; Puisne Justices: Roland Ritchie, Brian Dickson, Jean Beetz, Willard Estey, William McIntyre, Julien Chouinard, Antonio Lamer, Bertha Wilson

Reasons given
- Majority: Dickson J., joined by Beetz, Chouinard and Lamer JJ.
- Concurrence: Wilson J., joined by Ritchie and McIntyre JJ.
- Concurrence: Estey J.
- Laskin C.J. took no part in the consideration or decision of the case.

Guerin v The Queen [1984] 2 S.C.R. 335 is a Supreme Court of Canada decision on Aboriginal rights where the Court first stated that the government has a fiduciary duty towards the First Nations of Canada and established Aboriginal title to be a sui generis right.

== Background ==
The Musqueam Indian band held roughly 416 acres (1.7 km^{2}) of prime land in the Vancouver area. In 1958, the federal government, on behalf of the band, made a deal with the Shaughnessy Heights Golf Club to lease 162 acres (0.7 km^{2}) of the land in order to build a golf club. However, the actual terms of the agreement between the government and the club were not those that were told to the band.

In 1970, the band discovered the true terms and protested on the basis that the government had a duty to properly explain the full extent of the deal.

At trial, the court held that the Crown had breached their trust with the band and awarded the Musqueam ten million dollars. This ruling was overturned by the Federal Court of Appeal. The matter was then considered by the Supreme Court of Canada.

The case was named for Delbert Guerin, chief of the Musqueam, who credited his mother Gertrude Guerin, an earlier chief, as its inspiration: "The Guerin case came about because of me listening to her complain, no doubt about it."

== Decision ==
Dickson J., with Beetz, Chouinard, and Lamer concurring, held that the nature of Aboriginal title imposes an enforceable fiduciary duty upon the Crown. Dickson described the nature of Aboriginal title as a sui generis right that has no equivalent. Aboriginal Title was held to be a pre-existing legal right, not created by the Royal Proclamation of 1763, by s. 18(1) of the Indian Act, or by any other executive order or legislative provision. It is based upon the requirement to surrender land to the Crown as well as the historic relationship between the Crown and Aboriginals. The special right means that title to Aboriginal land can be alienable only to the Crown, which may use it only in the interests of the Aboriginals.

The Court found that the Crown's agents promised the Band to lease the land in question on certain specified terms, but in fact leased the land on different terms which was much less valuable. As a result, the majority held that it would be unconscionable to permit the Crown to simply ignore the terms promised to the First Nation's Band. The Court relied on principles from equity, that an agent, working on behalf of a principal, must act at all times in the principal's best interests. The Crown had breached their fiduciary obligation and thus the damages awarded by the lower court should be adopted to compensate for the Band's loss.

== Aftermath ==
The principle of "fiduciary duty" later became integral in the interpretation of Section 35 of the Constitution Act, 1982 which provides for protection of Aboriginal rights.

== See also ==
- Monarchy of Canada and the Indigenous peoples of Canada
- Calder v British Columbia (AG) (1971)
- R v Sparrow (1990)
- Delgamuukw v British Columbia (1997)
- Tsilhqot'in Nation v British Columbia (2014)
- Grassy Narrows First Nation v. Ontario (Natural Resources) (2014)
