= Well-Being Index =

- Developers: Corporate Web Services, Inc.
- Website: www.mededwebs.com/well-being-index

The Well-Being Index is an online self-assessment tool invented by researchers at Mayo Clinic that measures mental distress and well-being in seven-nine items. The Well-Being Index is an anonymous tool that allows participants to reassess on a monthly basis, track their well-being scores over time, compare their results to peers' and national averages, and access customized resources based on their assessment results. There are six clinically-validated versions of the Well-Being Index: Advanced Practice Provider, Employee, Medical Student, Nurse, Physician, and Resident/Fellow.

== Overview ==
The Well-Being Index takes around one minute to complete and measures six dimensions of distress and well-being specific to the Well-Being Index version. Possible dimensions include:

- Likelihood of burnout
- Severe fatigue
- Suicidal ideation
- Quality of life
- Meaning in work
- Work-life integration
- Risk of medical error
- Dropout risk
- Overall well-being

== History ==
The Well-Being Index was invented by Dr. Liselotte (Lotte) N. Dyrbye, MD, MHPE and Dr. Tait Shanafelt, MD of Mayo Clinic. It was originally developed to address physician burnout and distress internally at Mayo Clinic.

== Uses ==
The Well-Being Index has been used by a variety of hospitals, universities, academic medical centers, and associations, including:

- Henry Ford Health System
- Weill Cornell Medicine
- Ascension Medical Group
- Baylor College of Medicine
- American Academy of Family Physicians (AAFP)
- American Pharmacists Association (APhA)

== Versions ==
There are six clinically-validated versions of the Well-Being Index. Each version offers national benchmark comparative data.

=== Advanced Practice Provider Well-Being Index ===
The nine-item Advanced Practice Provider Well-Being Index measures distress and well-being among APPs, including nurse practitioners and physician assistants. This version of the Well-Being Index has been validated as a useful screening tool to measure likelihood of burnout, severe fatigue, prevalence of suicidal ideation, risk of medical error, meaning in work, and work-life integration among APPs.

=== Employee Well-Being Index (eWBI) ===
The eWBI was developed to identify distress and well-being among U.S. workers. The assessment consists of nine-items and measures six dimensions of distress and well-being, including quality of life, meaning in work, likelihood of burnout, severe fatigue, work-life integration, and suicidal ideation.

=== Medical Student Well-Being Index (MSWBI) ===
The MSWBI consists of seven items and is a version of the Well-Being Index designed to assess psychological distress in medical students. The MSWBI measures similar dimensions of distress and well-being as other versions of the Well-Being Index but includes dropout risk as a unique dimension.

=== Nurse Well-Being Index ===
The Nurse Well-Being Index is a nine-item assessment that measures likelihood of burnout, severe fatigue, suicidal ideation, quality of life, meaning in work, and work-life integration. This version of the Well-Being Index has been validated in stratifying distress and well-being and identifying the risk of reduced quality of care among U.S. nurses.

=== Physician Well-Being Index (PWBI) ===
The PWBI consists of nine items and is the original version of the Well-Being Index. It is designed as a brief screening tool for physicians in all specialties and measures the following six dimensions of distress and well-being: Likelihood of burnout, severe fatigue, suicidal ideation, risk of medical error, meaning in work, and work-life integration.

=== Resident & Fellow Well-Being Index ===
The Resident & Fellow Well-Being Index is designed specifically for physicians in training. This version consists of seven items that measure risk of medical error, sense of meaning in work, quality of life, suicidal ideation, severe fatigue, and likelihood of burnout.

== Scoring ==
The Well-Being Index calculates a total well-being score for participants based on their assessment responses. Assessments contain seven or nine items depending on the Well-Being Index version. The seven-item versions consist of yes/no response categories and calculate scores by adding the number of 'yes' responses. The nine-item versions contain an additional two Likert scale items that add or subtract points from the score of the first seven items.
