= Extinguishment =

Destruction or nullification of a right or contract

In contract law, extinguishment is the destruction of a right or contract. If the subject of the contract is destroyed (such as through merging the contract subject and the contract obligation), then the contract may be made void. Extinguishment occurs in a variety of contracts, such as land contracts (common, copyhold), debts, rents, and right of ways. A right may be extinguished by nullifying that right or, in the case of a debt, discharged by payment in full or through settlement.

An extinguishment may be by matter of fact and by matter of law. If a creditor receives satisfaction and full payment of a debt and the creditor releases the debtor, then that is express extinguishment by matter of fact. If a person is renting land and subsequently becomes the owner of that same land by purchase or descent, the rent is extinguished through implied extinguishment by matter of fact.

There are numerous situations where a claim is extinguished by operation of law. If two persons are jointly but not severally liable for a simple contract debt, a judgment at common law obtained against only one of the debtors works as an extinguishment of the claim on the other debtor as a matter of law. A conveyance of mortgaged land by the mortgagor to the mortgagee extinguishes the mortgage. However taking a promissory note for the amount due on the mortgage does not deprive the mortgage holder of a right to a lien, but merely suspends its enforcement until the note is payable.

== Extinguishment of common ==
Common land (a common), in England and Wales and the United States, is a piece of land owned by one person, but over which other people can exercise certain traditional rights, such as allowing their livestock to graze upon it. If the owner of the common right becomes the owner of the fee simple estate, then the common right becomes extinguished. If the crop or other item over which there is a common right is severed from the land, then the common right becomes extinguished. Other situations in which the common right becomes extinguished include legal release and approvement (improvement of common lands, by inclosing and converting them to the uses of husbandry for the advantage of the lord of the manor.)

== Extinguishment of copyhold ==
A copyhold was a parcel of land tenure granted to a peasant by the lord of the manor in return for services, such as agricultural services. Such grants/servitude was not always in the best interest of the peasant and the copyhold could be extinguished by an act of the tenant showing an intention not to hold the land any longer. Copyholds may be extinguished by the union of the copyhold and the freehold in the same person. Copyholds were gradually enfranchised (turned into ordinary holdings of land—either freehold or 999-year leasehold) during the 19th century. Legislation in the 1920s finally extinguished the last of them.

== Extinguishment of a debt ==
Debts may be extinguished by the creditor accepting a higher security. If the creditor recovers a judgment, the original debt is extinguished. However, a trust deed given to secure the payment of a bond is not extinguished by a judgment on the bond since the original debt is not merged by the trust deed. A debt evidenced by a note may be extinguished by a surrender of the note

== Extinguishment of rent ==
A union of the title to the lands and the rent in the same person will extinguish the rent. In Pennsylvania, a ground rent (rent of unimproved land) is extinguished by a conveyance from the ground rent owner to the tenant.

== Extinguishment of ways ==
Right of ways include the right to use the land of another for a special purpose, such as a passageway. If the owner of the right of way purchases the close over which the right of way lies, the right of way is extinguished.
