= Aboriginal land title in Canada =

In Canada, aboriginal title is considered a sui generis interest in land. Aboriginal title has been described this way in order to distinguish it from other proprietary interests, but also due to the fact its characteristics cannot be explained by reference either to only the common law rules of real property, or to only the rules of property found in Indigenous legal systems. The Supreme Court of Canada has characterised the idea that aboriginal title is sui generis as the unifying principle underlying the various dimensions of that title. Aboriginal title is properly construed as neither a real right nor a personal right, despite the fact that it appears to share characteristics of both real and personal rights. Aboriginal title refers to the concept of a sui generis right in land that originates from the exclusive occupation and use of a specific territory by an aboriginal group over which the group has a native historic attachment.

== Source of aboriginal title ==
In St. Catherine’s Milling and Lumber Co. v. The Queen (1888), the Supreme Court initially described aboriginal title as a “personal and usufructuary right” which derives its source from the Royal Proclamation of 1763. However, the Supreme Court's understanding of aboriginal title in Canadian constitutional law has changed over time. While the Royal Proclamation recognized the existence of aboriginal title, the constitutional document issued by King George III is not its source. It is now clear in Canadian constitutional law that the doctrine of terra nullius (roughly, "no man's land") never applied in Canada. To apply terra nullius would ignore aboriginal groups' relationship to the land and imply that prior to the assertion of Crown sovereignty, all land in Canada had never been occupied. Instead, the Royal Proclamation expressly recognizes that aboriginal peoples were in possession of the land prior to assertion of British sovereignty. Given that it arises from the prior occupation of land by indigenous people, aboriginal interest in land is described as a "burden" on the Crown's underlying title. This prior occupation is of importance and illustrates the sui generis, or unique, nature of aboriginal title. In Guerin v The Queen (1984), the Supreme Court described aboriginal title as a right that derives from indigenous people's historic occupation and possession of their traditional lands. The fact that aboriginal title arises from a possession before the assertion of European sovereignty is the principal element that differentiates it from estates such as fee simple estates. However, aboriginal title does confer ownership rights similar to those associated with a fee simple.

In Tsilhqot’in Nation v. British Columbia (2014), the Supreme Court stated:

The characteristics of Aboriginal title flow from the special relationship between the Crown and the Aboriginal group in question. It is this relationship that makes Aboriginal title sui generis or unique. Aboriginal title is what it is, the unique product of the historic relationship between the Crown and the Aboriginal group in question. Analogies to other forms of property ownership, for example, fee simple, may help us to understand aspects of Aboriginal title. But they cannot dictate precisely what it is or is not. As Justice Gérard Vincent La Forest put it in Delgamuukw v. British Columbia, Aboriginal title “is not equated with fee simple ownership; nor can it be described with reference to traditional property law concepts".

== Content of aboriginal title ==
Aboriginal title to land can be described by two main characteristics. First, aboriginal title provides a right of exclusive use and occupation over the land held. The purposes for which the land is held does not need to be limited to aboriginal practices, customs and traditions that are integral to distinctive aboriginal cultures. In other words, aboriginal title to land is not limited in any way to the historic and traditional uses of land by aboriginal people (e.g., hunting or fishing). Instead, aboriginal title encompasses a wide variety of uses that includes natural resources on and under the ground.

Aboriginal title confers the right to decide how the land will be used, enjoyed, occupied, possessed, pro-actively used and managed, and the right to the economic benefits of the land. In other words, "[w]hat aboriginal title confers is the right to the land itself".

However, there is an inherent limit to these uses, which is described by the second main characteristic of aboriginal title. The land cannot be used in a manner that is irreconcilable with the nature of the community's attachment to the land in question. In other words, the exclusive protected use of land by indigenous people must not be completely inconsistent with the nature of the community's attachment to the land which forms the basis of a particular group's claim to aboriginal title.

== See also ==
- Settler colonialism in Canada
- Declaration on the Rights of Indigenous Peoples
- "Rising Tide" Haida Title Lands Agreement
