= Delgamuukw v British Columbia =

1997 Supreme Court of Canada case

- Supreme Court of Canada

Hearing: June 16, 17, 1997 Judgment: December 11, 1997
- Full case name: Delgamuukw, also known as Earl Muldoe, suing on his own behalf and on behalf of all the members of the Houses of Delgamuukw and Haaxw (and others) v Her Majesty The Queen in Right of the Province of British Columbia and The Attorney General of Canada
- Citations: [1997] 3 SCR 1010
- Docket No.: 23799
- Ruling: Appeal allowed in part, cross appeal dismissed.

Court membership
- Chief Justice: Antonio Lamer; Puisne Justices: Gérard La Forest, Claire L'Heureux-Dubé, John Sopinka, Charles Gonthier, Peter Cory, Beverley McLachlin, Frank Iacobucci, John C. Major

Reasons given
- Majority: Lamer CJ (paras 1-186), joined by Cory and Major JJ
- Concurrence: McLachlin J (para 209)
- Concurrence: La Forest J (paras 187-208), joined by L'Heureux-Dubé J
- Iacobucci, Gonthier, and Sopinka JJ took no part in the consideration or decision of the case.

Delgamuukw v British Columbia, [1997] 3 SCR 1010, also known as Delgamuukw v The Queen, Delgamuukw-Gisday’wa, or simply Delgamuukw, is a ruling by the Supreme Court of Canada that contains its first comprehensive account of Aboriginal title (a distinct kind of Aboriginal right) in Canada. The Gitxsan and Wet’suwet’en peoples claimed Aboriginal title and jurisdiction over 58,000 square kilometers in northwest British Columbia. The plaintiffs lost the case at trial, but the Supreme Court of Canada allowed the appeal in part and ordered a new trial because of deficiencies relating to the pleadings and treatment of evidence. In this decision, the Court went on to describe the "nature and scope" of the protection given to Aboriginal title under section 35 of the Constitution Act, 1982, defined how a claimant can prove Aboriginal title, and clarified how the justification test from R v Sparrow applies when Aboriginal title is infringed. The decision is also important for its treatment of oral testimony as evidence of historic occupation.

While much of the decision is technically obiter dicta (since a new trial was ordered due to errors in how the evidence and pleadings were treated), the principles from Delgamuukw were restated and summarized in Tsilhqot'in Nation v British Columbia, 2014 SCC 44. There has not yet been a second trial in this case.

== Background ==
The Gitxsan and Wet’suwet’en peoples had attempted to negotiate jurisdiction, recognition of ownership, and self-government since Europeans first began settling on their traditional lands in the 1800s. The Canadian federal government received the Gitxsan declaration of claim in 1977, but British Columbia would not participate in the land claims process. By 1984, British Columbia had begun to allow clear-cut logging in the Gitxsan and Wet’suwet’en territory without permission from the hereditary chiefs. On October 24, 1984, thirty-five Gitxsan and thirteen Wet’suwet’en hereditary chiefs filed their statement of claim with the British Columbia Supreme Court.

=== Pre-Delgamuukw descriptions of Aboriginal title ===
By the 1970s, the courts had "begun to acknowledge the existence of Aboriginal legal rights in the land other than those provided for by treaty or statute." In Calder v British Columbia (AG), the Supreme Court recognized that Aboriginal title to land was based in "historic occupation and possession" of their traditional territories and "does not depend on treaty, executive order or legislative enactment."

[T]he fact is that when the settlers came, the Indians were there, organized in societies and occupying the land as their forefathers had done for centuries. This is what Indian title means...

— Calder v British Columbia (AG)

In Guerin v The Queen, the Court described Aboriginal title as a sui generis right, not found elsewhere in property law. In Canadian Pacific Ltd v Paul, the Court elaborated, "it is more than the right to enjoyment and occupancy, although, … it is difficult to describe what more in traditional property law terminology." In R v Adams, the Court said that Aboriginal title is a kind of Aboriginal right.

Until Delgamuukw, no Canadian court had defined in detail what Aboriginal title means. And, at the outset of this case in 1984, Section 35 of the Constitution Act, 1982 was relatively new. Courts had not yet given meaning to subsection (1): "The existing Aboriginal and treaty rights of the Aboriginal peoples of Canada are hereby recognized and affirmed", although the meaning was fairly well developed by the time the case made it to the Supreme Court in 1997.

==== Defendant on behalf of the Wet'suwet'en and Gitxsan Nations ====
The defendant, born May 16, 1936, as 'Delgamuukw', served as a Gitxsan Indigenous rights leader, as one of the Hereditary Chiefs in the Office of the Hereditary Chiefs of the Wetʼsuwetʼen, and as a representative for the joint Tribal Council of the Gitxsan and Wet’suwet’en nations. In 1997, for the purpose of the court proceedings, 'Delgamuukw', then 61, had his name anglicized as 'Earl Muldoe'. In 2010, Muldoe was also designated as a 'Companion of The Order of Canada' for his paintings and artistry. Delgamuukw died on January 3, 2022, at the age of 85.

== British Columbia courts ==
=== The claim ===
In 1984, Gitxsan and Wet’suwet’en hereditary chiefs claimed, on behalf of their Houses, unextinguished Aboriginal title and jurisdiction over territory in northwest British Columbia totalling 58,000 square kilometres, and compensation for land already alienated. Delgamuukw (English name Earl Muldoe) was a claimant for the Gitxsan, while Gisday’wa (Alfred Joseph) was one of those representing the Wet’suwet’en. The claim for jurisdiction was novel. If that claim were to have succeeded, Indigenous laws would prevail in the case of conflict with provincial law. BC argued that the "plaintiffs had no right or interest in the land, and that their claim for compensation ought to be against the federal government."

=== The trial and Chief Justice McEachern's decision (1991) ===
The trial took 374 days (318 days of evidence and 56 days of closing argument), spanning May 11, 1987, to June 30, 1990, in Vancouver and Smithers, British Columbia.

The Gitxsan and Wet’suwet’en relied upon their oral histories as evidence about their historical relationship with the land. Sixty-one witnesses gave evidence at trial, many in their own languages, using translators. Some witnesses sang or described ceremonial songs and performance relating the adaawḵ (the personal bloodline histories) of the Gitxsan and kungax (a song or songs about trails between territories) of the Wet’suwet’en. Some of this knowledge was translated into maps.

The judgement from Chief Justice Allan McEachern was released on March 8, 1991. Contrary to legal precedents such as Calder v British Columbia (AG), Judge McEachern dismissed the plaintiffs' claims to Aboriginal title, jurisdiction (self-government), and Aboriginal rights in the territories. Despite finding that Aboriginal rights of the Gitxsan and Wet’suwet’en had been extinguished, Chief Justice McEachern found that the Crown had made promises beginning in 1859 and 1860 that gave rise to a fiduciary duty: "to permit aboriginal people, but subject to the general law of the province, to use any unoccupied or vacant Crown land for subsistence purposes until such time as the land is dedicated to another purpose." He also dismissed the province's counterclaims for a declaration that the Gitxsan and Wet’suwet’en have no right or interest in the territory and for a declaration that their only claim for compensation could be against Canada.

This decision has been criticized for both its treatment of the oral evidence and for its tone. Chief Justice McEachern described pre-contact life of the Gitxsan and Wet’suwet’en as "nasty, brutish, and short." He didn't recognize pre-contact "institutions" and instead said that "they more likely acted as they did because of survival instincts." He was "unable to accept adaawk, kungax and oral traditions as reliable bases for detailed history but they could confirm findings based on other admissible evidence." He described the position of the Gitxsan and Wet’suwet’en as "idyllic" and "romantic". The Canadian Anthropology Society said the judgement "gratuitously dismisses scientific evidence, is laced with ethnocentric bias and is rooted in the colonial belief that white society is inherently superior." Chief Justice Lamer, writing for the majority at the Supreme Court of Canada, acknowledged that Chief Justice McEachern did not have the benefit of the reasons from R v Van der Peet, which says "courts must not undervalue the evidence presented by aboriginal claimants simply because that evidence does not conform precisely with the evidentiary standards [applied in other contexts]."

=== British Columbia Court of Appeal (1993) ===
The Gitxsan and Wet’suwet’en appealed. In the time between the trial judgement and the appeal, the British Columbia government changed parties, from the Social Credit Party to the New Democratic Party. The new government abandoned the position taken at trial on the issue of extinguishment, so amici curiae were appointed to assist the court on that issue.

On June 25, 1993, five members of the British Columbia Court of Appeal unanimously rejected Justice McEachern's ruling that all of the plaintiffs' Aboriginal rights had been extinguished. The Court of Appeal ordered the case back to trial to determine the nature and scope of those Aboriginal rights. Two of the justices, in dissent, would have gone further to also allow the appeal on the issue of Aboriginal title and to send that question back to trial as well.

== Supreme Court of Canada ==
In March 1994, the Gitxsan and Wet’suwet’en and the Province of British Columbia were granted leave to appeal to the Supreme Court of Canada. However, they obtained an adjournment in order to pursue a treaty settlement instead. The province suspended those negotiations in February 1996 and the parties revived their litigation.

The appeal was heard at the Supreme Court of Canada on June 16 and 17, 1997. The six justices announced their decision on December 11, 1997. The opinion of Chief Justice Lamer attracted a majority: Justices Cory and Major joined; Justice McLachlin concurred. The concurring opinion of Justice La Forest was joined by Justice L'Heureux-Dubé; Justice McLachlin was in substantial agreement.

Both the majority and concurrence agreed that it was an error to "[amalgamate] the individual claims brought by the 51 Gitksan and Wet’suwet’en Houses into two collective claims, one by each nation, for Aboriginal title and self-government." The court found this error sufficient to call for a new trial. Thus, the rest of the opinion is technically obiter dicta, but it is still significant in that it has been restated and summarized in Tsilhqot'in Nation v British Columbia.

The majority also found that the factual findings of the trial court could not stand because Justice McEachern's approach did not meet the principles laid out in R v Van der Peet.

Notwithstanding the challenges created by the use of oral histories as proof of historical facts, the laws of evidence must be adapted in order that this type of evidence can be accommodated and placed on an equal footing with the types of historical evidence that courts are familiar with, which largely consists of historical documents.

The trial judge, after refusing to admit, or giving no independent weight to these oral histories, reached the conclusion that the appellants had not demonstrated the requisite degree of occupation for "ownership". Had the trial judge assessed the oral histories correctly, his conclusions on these issues of fact might have been very different.

=== Aboriginal title ===
Chief Justice Lamer summarized the content of Aboriginal title:

I have arrived at the conclusion that the content of aboriginal title can be summarized by two propositions: first, that aboriginal title encompasses the right to exclusive use and occupation of the land held pursuant to that title for a variety of purposes, which need not be aspects of those aboriginal practices, customs and traditions which are integral to distinctive aboriginal cultures; and second, that those protected uses must not be irreconcilable with the nature of the group's attachment to that land.

The majority affirms that this is a sui generis right arising from the prior occupation of the land by Indigenous people; it is not fee simple ownership. The inherent limit (that the protected uses not be irreconcilable with the nature of the group's attachment to the land) is derived from one of the purposes of Aboriginal title: maintaining "the relationship of an aboriginal community with its land here is that it applies not only to the past, but to the future as well."

The majority places Aboriginal title on a spectrum alongside other Aboriginal rights:

- practices, customs, and traditions integral to the group's distinctive culture, with little connection to a particular piece of land, which still lead to Aboriginal rights to those activities,
- activities that take place on and have an intimate connection with a particular piece of land, which might lead to site-specific Aboriginal rights, and
- Aboriginal title, which is right to the land itself, and which entails the right to a broad range of uses, only subject to the inherent limit against uses irreconcilable with the nature of the group's attachment to the land.

The majority also lays out the test for proving Aboriginal title: "(i) the land must have been occupied prior to sovereignty, (ii) if present occupation is relied on as proof of occupation pre-sovereignty, there must be a continuity between present and pre-sovereignty occupation, and (iii) at sovereignty, that occupation must have been exclusive." That will be enough to demonstrate that the occupancy of the land is "sufficiently important to be of central significance to the culture of the claimants."

=== Infringements and justification ===
As with other Aboriginal rights, Aboriginal title can be infringed. The majority in Delgamuukw clarified how the justification test developed in R v Sparrow and modified in R v Gladstone applies when Aboriginal title is infringed.

The majority affirmed the broad characterization of compelling and substantial legislative objectives that might warrant an infringement: "legitimate government objectives also include the pursuit of economic and regional fairness and the recognition of the historical reliance upon, and participation in, the fishery by non-aboriginal groups." It then goes further:

the development of agriculture, forestry, mining, and hydroelectric power, the general economic development of the interior of British Columbia, protection of the environment or endangered species, the building of infrastructure and the settlement of foreign populations to support those aims, are the kinds of objectives that are consistent with this purpose and, in principle, can justify the infringement of Aboriginal title.

The second prong of the justification test asks whether the infringement is "consistent with the special fiduciary relationship between the Crown and aboriginal peoples." This fiduciary relationship gives rise to two additional components when Aboriginal title is infringed: the duty to consult (which varies with the degree of the infringement), and the requirement to provide fair compensation.

=== Self-government ===
The court said that the trial did not yield sufficient evidence to give any opinion regarding the right to self-government.

=== Extinguishment by the province ===
The court held that the province does not have the power to extinguish Aboriginal rights, neither directly (because of Section 91(24) of the Constitution Act, 1867) nor indirectly through laws of general applicability (because they could not indicate clear and plain intent).

=== Encouragement to negotiate ===
Both opinions concluded by encouraging all parties to pursue negotiated agreements through good faith negotiations.

[T]he Crown is under a moral, if not a legal, duty to enter into and conduct those negotiations in good faith. Ultimately, it is through negotiated settlements, with good faith and give and take on all sides, reinforced by the judgments of this Court, that we will achieve what I stated in Van der Peet to be a basic purpose of s. 35(1) -- “the reconciliation of the pre-existence of aboriginal societies with the sovereignty of the Crown”. [internal citations removed]

== Subsequent influence and treatment ==
The principles established by Delgamuukw were restated and summarized in Tsilhqot'in and the inherent limit was reworded. There, the Court said that Aboriginal title "cannot be alienated except to the Crown or encumbered in ways that would prevent future generations of the group from using and enjoying it. Nor can the land be developed or misused in a way that would substantially deprive future generations of the benefit of the land."

The second trial that was ordered has never happened, so the claim in this case remains unresolved. In the years soon after the decision, the province largely maintained its negotiating position, only changing it minimally. The decision did not order the government to change its position and the decision made clear how valuable Aboriginal title is. The government adopted some interim measures that shared some of the economic benefits resulting from resource development in land-claims areas. The response from the various First Nations in British Columbia varied: some interested in the treaty negotiation process, some in the economic integration through interim measures, and some considering additional litigation.

Delgamuukw has featured in discussion around the 2020 Canadian pipeline and railway protests, begun in solidarity with Wet’suwet’en hereditary chiefs opposed to the development of the Coastal GasLink Pipeline through territory to which they claim rights and title.

== See also ==
- Aboriginal land title in Canada
- Calder v British Columbia (AG) (1971)
- Guerin v The Queen (1984)
- R v Sparrow (1990)
- Tsilhqot'in Nation v British Columbia (2014)
- Grassy Narrows First Nation v. Ontario (Natural Resources) (2014)
