= List of Canadian correctional workers who have died in the line of duty =

This is a list of correctional workers in Canada who have died or been killed while in the performance of their duties.

| Name | Work Location | Date of death | Cause of death |
|---|---|---|---|
| Guard Henry (or Harry) Traill | Kingston Penitentiary, Kingston, Ontario | July 7, 1870 | First post-confederation peace officer to be killed in the line of duty. Struck in the head during an escape. |
| Guard John Rutledge | Toronto Central Prison, Toronto, Ontario | c.1888 | |
| Instructor David Cunningham | Kingston Penitentiary, Kingston, Ontario | December 5, 1890 | Killed during prison renovations. |
| Deputy Warden Richard H. Stedman | Alberta Penitentiary, Edmonton, Alberta | April 15, 1909 | Killed by an inmate with an axe in the prison carpentry shop. |
| Guard John Henry Joynson | British Columbia Penitentiary, New Westminster, British Columbia | October 5, 1912 | Shot during an escape. |
| Carpenter John (Jack) Leybourne | Ontario Reformatory, Guelph, Ontario | August 28, 1912 | |
| Guard Robert E. Coxford | Renfrew County Gaol, Pembroke, Ontario | November 29, 1914 | |
| Guard Anton Martinsen Fladeby | Stony Mountain Institution, Stony Mountain, Manitoba | May 11, 1919 | Stabbed by a disgruntled inmate. See story below. |
| Head Turnkey Arthur Awty | Wentworth County Gaol, Hamilton, Ontario | November 29, 1919 | Stabbed by an inmate |
| Guard Joseph Purcell | Kingston Penitentiary, Kingston, Ontario | September 29, 1919 | Trampled by a team of runaway horses. |
| Assistant Superintendent Norman J. Agnew | Ontario Reformatory, Guelph, Ontario | October 27, 1921 | |
| Matron Margaret Mick | Toronto Municipal Jail Farm For Women (Langstaff Jail Farm), Richmond Hill, Ontario | May 25, 1925 | First female peace officer killed in the line of duty. See story below. |
| Guard Stanley Blythe | Saskatchewan Penitentiary, Prince Albert, Saskatchewan | August 19, 1925 | Fell from an upper tier. |
| Guard John Williams | Stony Mountain Institution, Stony Mountain, Manitoba | June 25, 1926 | Killed in an explosion during excavations in the prison yard. |
| Guard Malcolm Earl Jenkin | Kingston Penitentiary, Kingston, Ontario | August 28, 1926 | Hit in the head with a crowbar during an escape. |
| Quarry Instructor Gabriel Childs | Collins Bay Penitentiary, Kingston, Ontario | February 23, 1933 | Succumbed to injuries sustained from an explosion while supervising inmates. |
| Guard John J. McCormick | Kingston Penitentiary, Kingston, Ontario | July 13, 1936 | Stabbed to death by an inmate. |
| Guard Kearwood "Kip" White | Huron County Gaol, Goderich, Ontario | December 25, 1941 | Struck on the head with a hammer by an escaping inmate. |
| Robert H. Canning | Toronto 'Don' Jail, Toronto, Ontario | June 10, 1944 | Beaten and strangled by inmates during an escape. See story below. |
| Guard John D. Kennedy | Kingston Penitentiary, Kingston, Ontario | April 26, 1948 | Shot during an escape. |
| William F. Trant | Ministry of the Attorney General, Corrections, British Columbia | 1956 | |
| Correctional Officer Ira Sefton Smith | Burwash Industrial Farm, Burwash, Ontario (Sudbury, Ontario) | January 16, 1959 | |
| Correctional Officer Charles Oxby | Burwash Industrial Farm, Burwash (Sudbury), Ontario | January 7, 1960 | |
| Guard William C. Wentworth | Kingston Penitentiary, Kingston, Ontario | November 24, 1961 | Stabbed by an inmate. |
| Guard Joseph E. (or Raymond J.) Tellier | St. Vincent De Paul Penitentiary, Laval, Quebec | May 2, 1963 | Stabbed by inmates during a hostage-taking. |
| Guard Edwin J. Masterton | Dorchester Penitentiary, Dorchester, New Brunswick | September 23, 1964 | Stabbed by an inmate. |
| Correctional Officer Howard Scott | Orangeville Jail, Orangeville, Ontario | March 9, 1973 | |
| Instructor Stanley Green | Stony Mountain Institution, Stony Mountain, Manitoba | July 22, 1974 | Killed by an inmate. |
| Instructor Georges Louis Nadeau | Cowansville Institution, Cowansville, Quebec | April 8, 1975 | Killed with a hammer by an inmate. |
| Correctional Officer Roy W. Eddy | Pacific Regional Psychiatric Centre, Abbotsford, British Columbia | June 6, 1975 | Heart attack while struggling with an inmate. |
| Joseph A.P. Gosselin | Archambault Penitentiary, Sainte-Anne-des-Plaines, Quebec | June 27, 1975 | Shot by inmate. |
| Classification Officer Mary Steinhauser | British Columbia Penitentiary, New Westminster, British Columbia | June 11, 1975 | Accidentally shot by rescuers during a hostage-taking. |
| Correctional Officer Douglas "Stik" White | Elgin-Middlesex Detention Centre, London, Ontario | May 23, 1978 | |
| Senior Correctional Officer Francis A.G. Eustace | Collins Bay Institution, Kingston, Ontario | November 26, 1978 | Stabbed by an inmate. |
| Food Services Officer Joseph D.P. Maurice | Collins Bay Institution, Kingston, Ontario | November 26, 1978 | Stabbed by an inmate. |
| Warden Michel Roy | Archambault Penitentiary, Sainte-Anne-des-Plaines, Quebec | February 7, 1978 | Shot in his driveway. |
| Guard Paul Guy Fournier | St. Vincent De Paul Penitentiary, Laval, Quebec | July 11, 1978 | Shot by inmates during a hostage-taking. |
| Correctional Officer William A. Morrison | Dorchester Penitentiary, Dorchester, New Brunswick | October 10, 1980 | Died in an explosion as rescuers were clearing a blockade during a hostage-taking. |
| Senior Correctional Officer David Van Den Abeele | Archambault Penitentiary, Sainte-Anne-des-Plaines, Quebec | July 25, 1982 | Killed during a riot. |
| Correctional Officer Denis Rivard | Archambault Penitentiary, Sainte-Anne-des-Plaines, Quebec | July 25, 1982 | Killed during a riot. |
| Senior Correctional Officer Léandre Leblanc | Archambault Penitentiary, Sainte-Anne-des-Plaines, Quebec | July 25, 1982 | Killed during a riot. |
| Correctional Officer Joseph A. Serge Delorme | Archambault Penitentiary, Sainte-Anne-des-Plaines, Quebec | April 22, 1983 | Stabbed by an inmate. |
| Correctional Officer Joseph Wendl | Stony Mountain Institution, Stony Mountain, Manitoba | July 13, 1984 | Stabbed by inmates. |
| Correctional Officer Rudy "Vern" Friesen | Stony Mountain Institution, Stony Mountain, Manitoba | July 13, 1984 | Stabbed by inmates. |
| Alvin A. Frank | Regina Correctional Centre, Regina, Saskatchewan | June 3, 1987 | Officer Alvin Frank was involved in a fatal car accident while on escort |
| Correctional Officer Daniel Lennon | Ottawa-Carleton Detention Centre, Ottawa, Ontario | February 25, 1991 | |
| Correctional Officer John Weszner Jr. | Elgin-Middlesex Detention Centre, London, Ontario | December 9, 1991 | |
| Bill M. Kennedy | Ministry of the Solicitor General & Correctional Services, British Columbia | 1993 | |
| Correctional Officer Arnold H. Harrison | Springhill Institution, Springhill, Nova Scotia | January 28, 1997 | Killed in a traffic accident while transporting inmates. |
| Correctional Officer Diane Lavigne | Direction générale des services correctionnels, Quebec | June 26, 1997 | Shot by members of Hells Angels. See story below. |
| Correctional Officer Pierre Rondeau | Direction générale des services correctionnels, Quebec | September 8, 1997 | Shot by members of Hells Angels. See story below. |
| Senior Project Officer Daniel T. A. Rowan | Correctional Service Canada International Relations Division - Overseas | November 12, 1999 | Killed in a plane crash while representing Correctional Services Canada in Kosovo. |
| Operational Manager Alex Finkle | Brantford Jail, Brantford, Ontario | August 26, 2000 | |
| Parole Officer Louise Pargeter | Yellowknife, Northwest Territories | October 6, 2004 | Stabbed by a parolee. |
| Corrections Officer Rhonda Commodore | The Pas, Manitoba | November 6, 2014 | Automobile accident |
| Correctional Peace Officer Solomon Osagiede | Edmonton Remand Centre, Edmonton, Alberta. | March 7, 2019 | Collapse during training |

== Margaret Mick ==
Margaret Mick (1 June 1860 – 25 May 1925) was Canada's first female peace officer to be killed in the line of duty. On the night of Monday, May 25, 1925 Mick, who worked as a Matron, was the only staff member on duty at the Toronto Municipal Jail Farm for Women in Concord, Ontario. About 10:15 PM, one inmate was able to squeeze through the bars of her cell and free another. The two of them waited while a third complained about a leak in her cell. When Mick came to investigate she was jumped by the two lying in wait for her. She was beaten unconscious, and tied to pipes in a utility room. She was found dead the next morning still tied to the pipes.

Her three assailants were caught and convicted of their crime and each served five years in jail.

Mick was the first woman to be added to the memorial commemorating fallen police and peace officers near Parliament Hill in Ottawa, Ontario.

The Farm was located in Richmond Hill on the north side of Highway 7 from Yonge Street to Bayview Avenue. The facility opened in 1912, was closed in 1959 and demolished in 1981. The surrounding land is now mixed commercial and residential development with no traces of the former facility.

== Anton Martinsen Fladeby ==
Anton Fladeby came to Canada from Norway in the spring of 1909, a few of months prior to his 20th birthday and on December 1, 1914, at the age of 25, he enlisted as a guard at Manitoba Penitentiary (known today as the Stony Mountain Penitentiary). During World War I, he saw action overseas in France with the Canadian Army. In 1919, he returned to Canada and after a month of rest, returned to duty at Manitoba Penitentiary.

On Friday, May 2, 1919, ten days after his return to his work at the penitentiary, Fladeby was checking inmates in and out of the barbershop area when he encountered inmate Albert Johnson. Fladeby had recently searched Johnson’s cell and discovered a letter that the latter was writing, complaining about the ill treatment of inmates at Manitoba Penitentiary. Letters of this type were considered contraband at the time and Fladeby had confiscated it. Inmate Johnson now harboured strong resentment toward Fladeby.

Inmate Johnson lunged at Fladeby, stabbing him in the neck with a small knife he had gotten from the infirmary to "cut his fingernails", severing the artery on the right side. Two other inmates came to the aid of Fladeby and administered first aid until the arrival of the penitentiary doctor. Fladeby seemed to be resuscitating and was taken to the Winnipeg General Hospital. However, on Sunday, May 11, 1919, Anton Fladeby succumbed to his wounds. He was buried with full military honours in the "Field of Honour" at Brookside Cemetery in Winnipeg.

Albert Johnson was found guilty of manslaughter and received a life sentence, of which he served 16 years until his deportation to the United States.

== John Williams ==
John Williams, a veteran of both the Boer War and World War I, became a guard with the Canadian Penitentiary Service on March 11, 1920. In the mid-1920s construction of a new sewage treatment plant began at the Stony Mountain Penitentiary (then called the Manitoba Penitentiary). On June 26, Williams was supervising an inmate work-gang blasting rock when a laid charge failed to detonate. Williams allowed an "inordinate amount of time" to pass before he removed the inmates to a safe area and investigated. Just as Williams reached the charge it detonated, killing him instantly.

Williams was buried with full military honours in the "Field of Honour" at Brookside Cemetery in Winnipeg. He was survived by his wife and four children.

== Kearwood "Kip" White ==
Guard Kip White, a turnkey at the Huron County Gaol, was murdered in December, 1941. White was struck on the head with a hammer by an escaping inmate on 14 December, but did not immediately die. Shortly after, an x-ray showed that an abscess had formed on his brain, and on Christmas Day, White died on the operating table.

== Robert Henry Canning ==
Robert Canning, a veteran of World War I, began working at the Toronto (Don) Jail on April 1, 1944 after being honourably discharged from the Veterans' Guard in March. On June 10, 1944, Canning was assigned to the jail infirmary, which at the time housed eight inmates, many of which were mentally disturbed and restrained in their beds. Two of the inmates not restrained were awaiting transfer to the Kingston Penitentiary, one to serve a four-year sentence and the other nineteen years.

At about 10:00 PM the two inmates jumped Canning and beat and strangled him to death. Another guard was supposed to check on Canning during his patrols, but failed to do so. A bloody trail around the infirmary indicated that Canning did not succumb without a fight. His body was found later, tied to a pipe near the window through which the inmates escaped.

The escape was only partially successful. When the first inmate lowered himself from the window, the makeshift rope broke preventing the second inmate from following. The first inmate was recaptured shortly after. Both were convicted of manslaughter and sentenced to an additional 25 years for one and 10 years for the other.

== Diane Lavigne and Pierre Rondeau ==
Two of the most notorious deaths of correctional officers in Canada were the assassinations of Diane Lavigne and Pierre Rondeau ordered by members of the Hells Angels motorcycle gang in Quebec. Lavigne was shot on June 26, 1997 from a passing motorcycle as she drove home from work. Rondeau and his partner Robert Corriveau were ambushed on September 8, 1997 as they drove an empty prison bus to pick up inmates. Corriveau suffered major injuries but ultimately survived after being left for dead.

Stéphane Gagné, a former Hells Angels who turned informant after being identified as having participated in the two murders, testified that the officers were selected at random as part of a broader plan to destabilize the justice system in Quebec.

In May 2002, Maurice (Mom) Boucher, one of the leaders of the Hells Angels in Quebec, was convicted for having ordered the killings.

== See also ==
- The Officer Down Memorial Page
