= Reformatory =

Correctional facility popular during the late 19th and early 20th centuries

A reformatory or reformatory school is a youth detention center or an adult correctional facility popular during the late 19th and early 20th centuries in Western countries. In the United Kingdom and United States, they came out of social concerns about cities, poverty, immigration, and gender following industrialization, as well as from a shift in penology to reforming instead of punishing the criminal. They were traditionally single-sex institutions that relied on education, vocational training, and removal from the city. Although their use declined throughout the 20th century, their impact can be seen in practices like the United States' continued implementation of parole and the indeterminate sentence.

== United Kingdom ==
=== Reformatories and industrial schools ===
Reformatory schools were penal facilities originating in the 19th century that provided for juvenile offenders. They were certified by the government starting in 1850. As society's values changed, the use of reformatories declined and they were coalesced by an act of Parliament into a single structure known as approved schools. Although similar in some of their practice, industrial schools were intended to prevent vulnerable children becoming criminal.

There was a perceived rise in juvenile delinquency in the early 19th century; whereas in a rural economy very young children could gain paid employment doing tasks such as bird scaring and stone gathering. These opportunities were not available in the cities. Youngsters were very visible on the streets. In 1816, Parliament set up a ‘Committee for Investigating the Alarming Increase in Juvenile Crime in the Metropolis’, in 1837 the writer Charles Dickens published Oliver Twist, a story about a child involved in a street gang, and in 1847 it was recognised in the Juvenile Offences Act 1847 that juvenile offenders under 14 should be tried in a special court and not an adult court. Begging and vagrancy was rife, and it was these low level misdemeanours that caused the magistrates to send vulnerable youngsters to industrial schools to learn to be industrious, and learn skills that would make then more employable.

More serious crimes required an element of punishment, but in an environment away from older prisoners who would have a negative effect on the youngster. The power to set up such an establishment was given in the Youthful Offenders Act 1854 (also known as the Reformatory Schools Act 1854). This provided financial assistance and support for reformatory schools for convicted young offenders as an alternative to prison. Industrial schools were regularised three years later by the Industrial Schools Act 1857.

=== Early reformatories ===
Early initiatives began in 1756, with the founding of the Marine Society "for the purpose of clothing landsmen and boys for the use of the king's ships, and as an expedient to provide for poor boys who might become a nuisance." In 1788, the Philanthropic Society was set up and opened an institution at St George's Fields, Southwark, "for the protection of poor children, and the offspring of convicted felons; and for the reformation of those who have themselves been engaged in criminal practices."

Another institution was also begun in 1778, on the Isle of Wight, which originally served as a military hospital and a children's asylum. By 1838, it had been transformed into HM Prison Parkhurst, a prison for children. 123 Parkhurst apprentices were sent to the Colony of New Zealand in 1842 and 1843, and nearly 1,500 boys between the ages of 12 and 18 were sent to various colonies in Australia and New Zealand. The Swan River Colony received 234 such apprentices between 1842 and 1849, then chose to accept adult convicts as well. Victoria and Tasmania also received "Parkhurst Boys", who were referred to as "apprentices", not convicts. During this period, Parkhurst Prison Governor Captain George Hall (in office from 1843 to 1861) employed the boys to make bricks for the construction of the C and M block wings of the prison building.

In 1817, Samuel Hoare the Quaker banker and philanthropist and the architect James Bevan proposed a new suitable prison for young offenders; but there was no consensus as to whether a prison should be for deterrence, retribution, punishment, removing a cause of nuisance, or reforming the prisoner.

Separation of youngsters from adult prisoners was proposed again by Robert Peel's Gaols Act 1823, but implementation generally failed. From 1824 to 1826 some boys were housed on the prison hulk Captivity.

By 1866 there were 51 certified reform schools in England and 14 in Scotland, but this had declined to 43 in 1913, while certified industrial schools had become more popular moving from 50 in 1866 to 132 (residential) and 21 (dayschools) in 1913.

=== Conditions ===
The regime was strict but fair and humane within the context of the times. Good behaviour was rewarded and poor behaviour punished. Punishment followed rule-breaking and rewards followed compliance. The rules were clear and transparent. The morality was simple and this would provide some security as children.

Similarly, normal living conditions for the urban poor involved overcrowded multiple occupancy in buildings with no mains drainage where diseases were rife. With no health care available—or affordable—there was a high death rate amongst the malnourished children. In the reformatory there was simple regular food, the conditions were clean, and medical care was available. In addition, children were given free education and some training in a skill that would be marketable when they had finished their time. The success rate was high.

=== Discipline ===
The differences between a 'certified reformatory' and a 'certified industrial school' lay in the intake and the philosophy. Industrial schools took students that needed protection, while the reformatory took students that had been already convicted of a serious offence. When students were sent to a reformatory, they first served a two-week spell in a full prison. Liberals thought this was pointless and conservatives still thought this would act as a 'deterrent' and was meaningful 'retribution'. Some reformatories trained for the a future in agriculture and hoped the graduates would choose to emigrate, other trained the miscreants for a life at sea either in the military or the merchant navy. To this end ten training hulks were purchased.

The Akbar, (purchased in 1862) was a reform training ship moored off Birkenhead on the River Mersey. It accommodated 200 boys aged 14–16 from all over the country who had been sentenced to detention of at least 5 years. It was run by the Liverpool Juvenile Reform Society Boys were occupied in continually scrubbing the decks and until 1862 in picking oakum (teasing apart old rope so the fibres could be reused). They learned tailoring and shoemaking. Recreation was limited to reading suitable magazines, bagatelle and playing draughts.

On 27 September 1887, ('Akbar Mutiny') while the captain was ashore the boys mutinied, they armed themselves with sticks, broke into the stores and entered the captains cabin, and stole valuables. Seventeen boys escaped on a stolen boat. There were recaptured after a few days and sent for trial. Two were sentenced to hard labour, but the rest were sent back to the ship and punished with the birch, solitary confinement and a diet of biscuit and water. The inspectors blamed the incident on the staff not being firm enough with the boys.

In July 1899, another of the Merseyside training ships, the Clarence, was destroyed by a fire on a day when the ship was to have received a visit from the Bishop of Shrewsbury. An official inquiry reached no firm conclusions as to the cause, noting however that "There remains the theory that the ship was deliberately fired".

On shore the Mount St Bernard's RC Reformatory opened in 1856. In the same year there was a mutiny, then in 1864 a riot. In 1870 a boy died. Again in 1875 there was a mutiny where 60 out of 200 boys escaped. Three years later in 1878 there was another mutiny, with a break out and an officer was stabbed.

The Akbar was retired in 1910 and the boys moved on shore to the 'Akbar Nautical Training School' at Heswall. The magazine John Bull published a report on the Akbar Scandal, detailing cruel treatment that had apparently led to a number of deaths. It detailed that boys were tortured and there were several deaths. Boys were gagged with blankets before being secured to a birching horse, their trousers removed and then birched with hawthorn branches. The ill boys were considered malingerers and caned. Minor offences were punished with drenching and being forced to stand upright throughout the night; several boys died as a result. The Home Office internal report exonerated the Akbar staff, but this led to a Departmental Committee in 1913 inquiring into punishment practices used, and the welfare of the children with reformatory and industrial schools.

=== Consolidation ===
The Akbar Scandal triggered a change in the management of Reformatories and Industrial Schools. They lost their autonomy and became the subject of increased inspection. Charles Russell was appointed that year as Chief Inspector of the Reformatory and Industrial Schools, and shaped new ideas about the boys' welfare. The ethos returned to the one of care founded in the 1830s, away from the one of punishment that it had become. Numbers on roll declined as magistrates started to prefer the probation system. The schools accepted the common name of Approved schools in 1927, and this was formalised by the Children and Young Person's Act 1933, which effectively ended the Victorian Industrial and Reformatory School System. The remaining schools were re-constituted as Approved Schools with objectives more appropriate for youngsters in the 20th century.

== United States ==
Similar to the United Kingdom, reformatories in the United States were an alternative to traditional prisons for youth and young adults that came out of social and prison reform movements of the 19th century and early 20th centuries, also known as the Progressive Era. Manual labor colleges, which emerged at the same time, were closely related institutions that primarily took in vagrant youth.

=== Origins and practice ===
Social reformers were concerned about the urban poor, especially the growing presence of white immigrants like those from Ireland, slum conditions, and their perceived connection to rising crime rates in cities. At the same time, prison reformers were investigating and examining the terrible conditions at traditional prisons and their perceived failure to rehabilitate prisoners. Reformatories emerged as penal practice shifted toward "treat[ing] rather than punish[ing]" inmates and attempting to prevent the creation of future criminals, which was marked by the first meeting of the National Congress on Penitentiary and Reformatory Discipline in 1870 in Cincinnati, Ohio. Penologists from around the world gathered to consider new visions for imprisonment and collectively endorsed a general aim for reforming prisoners with their Declaration of Principles.

=== Women's reformatories in New York State ===
Reformatories were mostly single-sex institutions that offered gendered "educational, vocational, and recreational" activities and opportunities. Reformatories for women aimed to legislate morality through criminalizing female sexuality, contributing to the creation of the category of "delinquent girl." White middle and upper-class women spearheaded the reformatory movement for women, criticizing the condition of women in traditional correctional facilities, and advocating for separate institutions. At New York's Auburn Prison (1818 – ), for example, female prisoners did not fit into the ascetic penology the facility pioneered. Segregated from the male population in a crowded, unventilated attic above the guard's barracks, not only did they defy the Silent System Auburn enforced, but were also unsupervised, and vulnerable to the predations of male guards. Further, women were not allowed to contribute through manual labor, and were left to languish, locked inside most of the time.

Part of the problem was that before the Civil War, women were an extreme minority in United States' prisons: in the mid-1840s, Dorothea Dix recorded a grand total of 167 women in prisons from Maine through Virginia. As Beaumont and De Tocqueville observed in their survey of American Prisons ("On the Penitentiary System in The United States..."):

It is because they occupy little space in the prison, that they have been neglected. It is the same with most evils of society, a remedy for which is ardently sought if they are important; if they are not alarming they are overlooked.

But when a female inmate, secretly five months pregnant, was flogged to death in the early 1830s, progressive activists were livid, and pushed the New York State Legislature to found Mount Pleasant Prison, in Ossining, New York, in 1835, the first female prison created by an act of law in the United States. Mount Pleasant and other women's facilities like it aimed to make inmates embody Victorian standards of womanhood, through training in domestic services, and education regarding sexual standards and women's role in society. Prisons like Bedford Hills (1901 – ) went so far as to adopt a "cottage plan," each housing unit with 28 single rooms (which could be decorated), a kitchen, and a flower garden. Even well into the 1920s – and supported by the social science of the era, as codified in law by the 1908 Muller v. Oregon ruling – labor in women's prisons would be limited to sewing, cleaning, and other chores.

=== Exclusions ===
Black youth were traditionally excluded from reformatory institutions, like reformatories and industrial schools, unless separate ones were created exclusively for them, like Philadelphia's "Colored House of Refuge." These institutions did not offer similar types of education and training to those for white youth and, instead, often prepared Black youth for gendered menial labor (ex: physical labor and domestic work) that would reinforce their social position.

== Canada ==
The term "reformatory" also has considerable constitutional significance in Canada, as s.92 (6) of the British North America Act, 1867 exclusively reserves powers over reformatories and prisons to provincial jurisdiction, as well as pre-trial incarceration for those judged unsuitable for bail. In contrast, s. 91 (28) exclusively reserves powers over penitentiaries and criminal legislation to federal jurisdiction creating an intricately overlapping burden of responsibility In some provinces, particularly British Columbia, pre-trial detainees greatly suffer relatively to convicted provincial inmates (or even many federal inmates) . Under current law, most juveniles and anyone sentenced to a term of imprisonment up to and including two years less a day will serve time in a provincial prison or reformatory (although they may be released far earlier due to overcrowding or a determination that further incarceration is unjustified). Controversially, the use of "two years less a day" sentences has been used by some judges to avoid mandatory sentences such as deportation, weapons prohibitions, prohibitions to entry to the US, or harsh pardon ineligibility barriers.

The use of the terms "prison", "correctional centre", and "reformatory" vary by province and category of offender. In contrast, federal penitentiaries are mostly referred to simply as "institutions". In addition, a person who would face a provincial sentence of incarceration for an offence would face criminal proceedings more directly administered by the province. For example, judges in such proceedings are appointed by the province, rather than superior court justices who are appointed by the federal government (despite most prosecutors, superior court justices, and court costs being paid by the provinces in such cases). Provincial governments also have more leeway to create diversion programs in such cases. Such offences are often prosecuted (if at all) by summary charge and result in relatively minor sentences.

=== Reformatories in Ontario, Canada ===
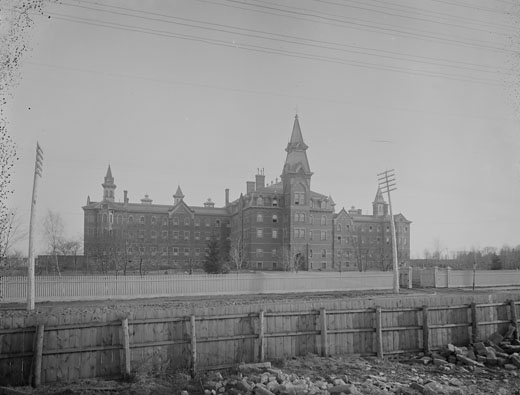
The Andrew Mercer Reformatory for Women in Toronto in 1895

Until 1972, the term reformatory referred to an Ontario provincial prison for either juveniles (16 and 17 years of age) or adults (18 years of age or older). Very often, one reformatory facility would house both. Offenders under the age of 16 were held in Training Schools. After 1972, when Ontario's Department of Correctional Services (having been renamed in 1968 from the Department of Reform Institutions) became the Ministry of Correctional Services, these facilities were officially redesignated as correctional centres.

Examples:

- Ontario Reformatory-Guelph became Guelph Correctional Centre
- Ontario Reformatory-Mimico became Mimico Correctional Centre
- Andrew Mercer Reformatory for Women was, for a time, renamed The Mercer Complex

== See also ==
- Social Work
- Borstal
- Reform school
- Elmira Prison
- Lancaster Industrial School for Girls
- Ohio State Reformatory
- Ohio Reformatory for Women
- Oklahoma State Reformatory
- Kentucky State Reformatory
- Lorton Reformatory
