= Mimico Correctional Centre =

Prison in Ontario, Canada 1887–2011

Coordinates: 43°36′43.27″N 79°30′57.82″W

- Interactive map of Mimico Correctional Centre
- Location: Toronto, Ontario, Canada
- Status: Demolished
- Security class: Maximum/Medium
- Capacity: various
- Opened: 1887
- Closed: 2011
- Managed by: Ministry of Community Safety and Correctional Services

The Mimico Correctional Centre was a provincial medium-security correctional facility for adult male inmates serving a sentence of 2-years-less-a-day or less in Ontario, Canada. Its history can be traced back to 1887. The Mimico Correctional Centre is one of several facilities operated by the Ministry of Community Safety and Correctional Services and was located at 130 Horner Avenue in the district of Etobicoke which is now a part of Toronto, Ontario, Canada. The facility was closed in 2011 and demolished to make room for the new Toronto South Detention Centre which opened in 2014.

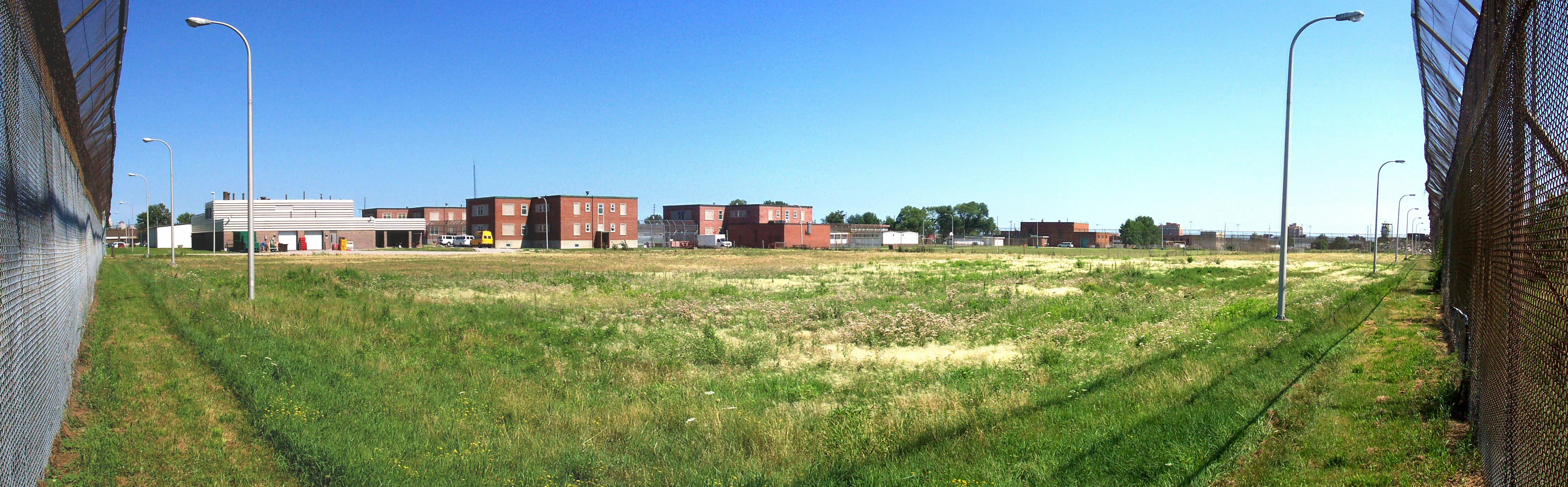
NW perimeter looking SE

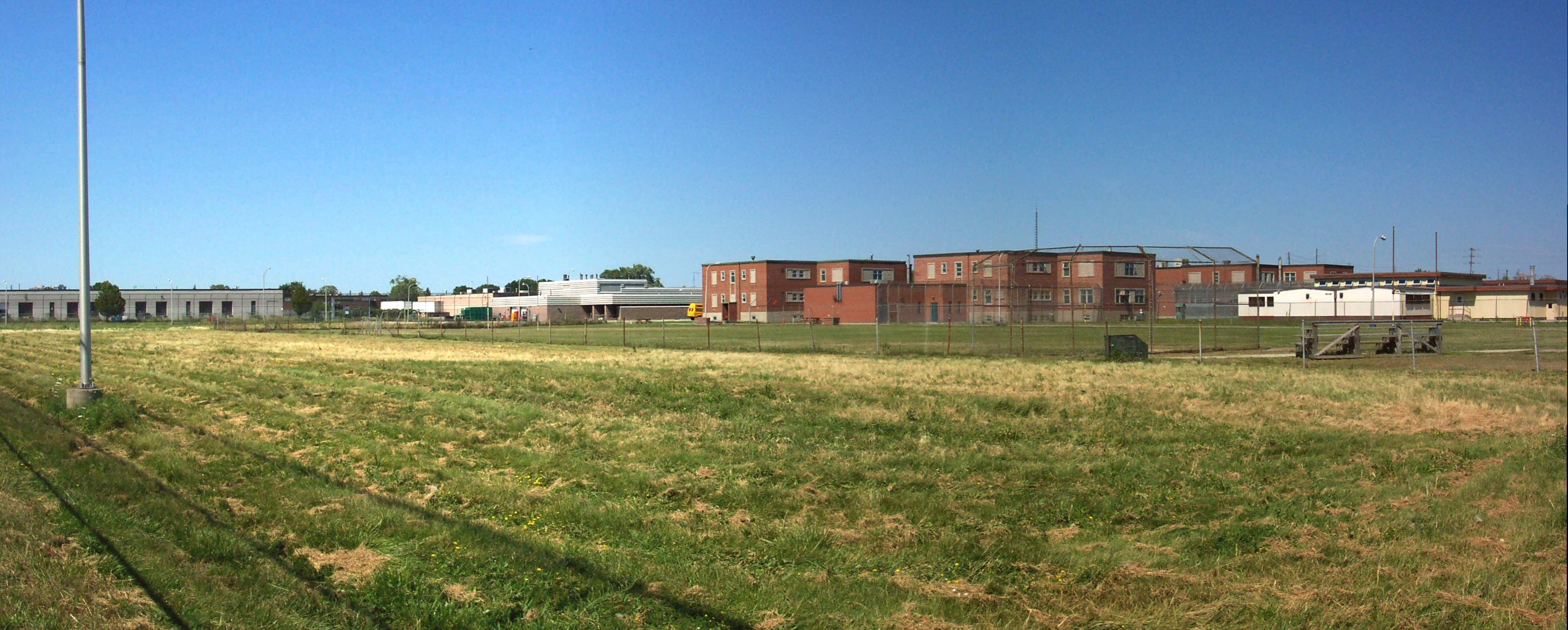
SW perimeter looking NE

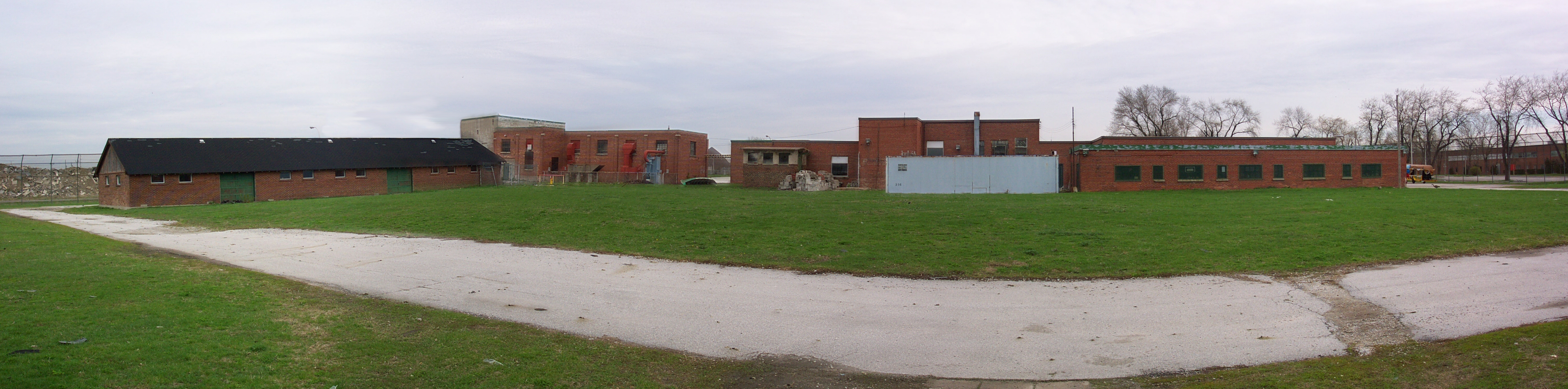
Industrial buildings prior to being demolished to make way for the new detention centre

== History ==
1887

The Mimico Correctional Centre began its history as the Victoria Industrial School for Boys, which opened on May 16 in the town of Mimico, Ontario (just west of Toronto). Headed by Superintendent W.J. Hendrie. The school (essentially a juvenile reformatory) emphasized child rescue, reform through character development, moral and academic education, and vocational training.

The opening ceremonies were officiated by Lord Lansdowne, the Governor General of Canada. The first boy was registered at the school on June 14.

At its peak, the school consisted of the following:

- Six 'Cottages' (3 or 4 storey Victorian houses)
- Hospital
- Skating rink
- Farm with greenhouses
- School with assembly hall
- Gymnasium with indoor swimming pool
- Workshops
- Administration building

The school received 'students', aged from under 10 through 14 years, through the Toronto School Board Truancy Department. Funding was provided by the province, municipality, and parental-fees (contributed "in proportion to their means"). The daily routine at the school consisted of 4.5 hours of work and 3.5 hours of school/drill.

The typical daily routine was as follows:

06:30 Rise and Wash
07:00 Morning Prayers
07:30 Breakfast
08:00 Playground
08:30 Work
10:30 Playground
11:00 Work
12:00 Cottage
12:30 Dinner
13:00 Playground
13:30 Work
15:00 Playground
15:30 School
18:30 Tea
19:00 Cottage (Winter)
20:45 Bed (Winter)
19:00 Playground (Summer)
20:00 Cottage (Summer)
21:00 Bed (Summer)

The school was based on 'the family plan' where boys lived in 'cottages' with a matron, who acted as mother, and a guard, who acted as father. The guards were actually skilled tradesmen who also supervised the boys at work. Some of the trades taught to the boys included carpentry, tailoring, printing, mechanics, and husbandry. The boys also performed work in the kitchen, laundry, and assisted the matrons with the housekeeping. The following is an excerpt from Superintendent Hendrie's first annual report:

It seemed a curious undertaking to erect a school for these waifs without bar or cell or hardly a whip, but the lads appear to have dropped into the groove at once, there having been but three attempts to escape. This school differs from a reformatory in that it is in no sense a prison, and the boys are not sent down as criminals, neither are they turned loose upon the world at the expiration of a fixed term, but are apprenticed to some trusty farmer or mechanic... Poor 'bags of bones', found in a deplorable state, have acquired the home feeling and habits of industry and obedience in the kindly atmosphere of the School.

Violence was regularly used to discipline boys at the school. This included striking boys with straps, handcuffing, and bread-and-water diets. This may have been partly influenced by the fact that the school was governed by a private board of governors instead of the directly by the Board of Education for Toronto.

1913

The Ontario Government found clay and shale deposits on land it owned in Mimico providing a natural source of building materials for the Government's own needs, it was quickly exploited, and the Toronto Brick and Tile Company was built. This brickyard was a satellite camp run by the Toronto Central Prison (built in 1874), an adult-male institution located at King Street and Strachan Avenue in Parkdale, a section of Toronto. The plant could produce over two million bricks a year for government use.

1915

The Toronto Central Prison closed and the newly built Ontario Reformatory-Guelph - known today as the Guelph Correctional Centre - assumed responsibility for the brickyard.

1927

The Victoria Industrial School became known as the Mimico Reform School.

1928

The site of the Toronto Central Prison brickyard became a reformatory.

1935

The Mimico Reform School was closed. Following the closing of Penetang (another reform school), the school had become a dumping ground for more "hardened boys", and with the increase in population, the rehabilitative success decreased sharply. In December 1934, the Ontario public secretary ordered it closed amid sensational public accusations that the school was a "barbarous and antiquated" institution. Remaining students were transferred to the Bowmanville Training School.

The Reform School and adjacent property were merged with the Mimico out-camp for the Ontario Reformatory-Guelph. The Toronto Brick & Tile Company became known as the Ontario Brick & Tile Company and redesignated as the Ontario Reformatory-Mimico.

1936

The Ontario Reformatory-Mimico became autonomous from the Guelph reformatory.

World War II

The site was used as a POW camp (known as Camp 22) for German prisoners, many of whom were Merchant-marines and U-boat crewmen. Mimico was just one of many such camps spread across Ontario and Canada. The prisoners at Mimico were housed in huts and fed in the main dormitory building.

1946

The Province of Ontario formed the Department of Reform Institutions overseeing about 10 institutions.

1951

The Alex G. Brown Memorial Clinic opened on site in the old 'Beverly Jones Cottage' (left over from the Victoria Industrial School). The clinic provided treatment for drug and alcohol addiction.

Ontario Reformatory-Mimico occupied 200 acres (0.8 km^{2}). On the property were 51 dairy cows, 362 pigs and poultry.

1952

Buildings 1, 2, 3, and 4 were built (construction began 1948).

The buildings were connected with canopied walkways that extended south to the dining-hall/old administration building. Steam-pipes ran under the walkways from the boiler-house to heat the four new buildings and as a result, the walkways were almost always clear of ice and snow in the winter.

Building 2, as an annex of the Alex G. Brown Clinic, was used to house sexual deviates, screened at the Ontario Reformatory-Millbrook.

1961

New boiler-house built (now used by maintenance as workshops).

1962

New administration building added.

1967

160 acres (0.6 km^{2}) was sold to the Borough of Etobicoke and rezoned for industrial use.

1968

(January) The Department of Reform Institutions became known as the Department of Correctional Services and the provincial government took over control of the more than 50 county and district jails.

The treatment of sex offenders was moved from the Alex G. Brown Clinic to the Ontario Hospital.

Industry at Mimico showed an annual output of 275,000 bricks; 12 tons of tile; 4829 slippers; 700 boot/shoe repairs; 662 picnic tables; 449 rolls of snow fence; as well as a number of fireplace grills and flag-poles.

The inmate capacity was 350 in the reformatory, 108 in the Alex G. Brown Clinic and 30 at Camp Hillsdale (a minimum-security forestry camp).

1969

Ontario Brick and Tile Company was closed following pressure from outside labour unions that argued that the plant was taking jobs from their members.

1972

Department of Correctional Services became known as the Ministry of Correctional Services.

For the first time, females were allowed to work as Correctional Officers; They had previously been known as Matrons and restricted to working with female inmates or juvenile offenders.

Ontario Reformatory-Mimico became the Mimico Correctional Centre.

1973

The Alex G. Brown Clinic was moved to the Ontario Correctional Institute.

The part of the property that was formally the Victoria Industrial School for Boys was sold to the Borough of Etobicoke (currently the site of former Toronto Police 21 Division and Ourland Park).

1975

Mimico Correctional Centre was 'closed' with plans to move all staff and inmates to the Maplehurst Correctional Centre. The institution was cleared of inmates and only a handful of staff remained when it was decided that Mimico should be 're-opened'.

The following is an excerpt from an article in the Correctional Update, an internal periodical. The article, written in February 1975, reported on the impending closure of Mimico:

One man who remembers some of the by-gone days at Mimico is Harry Woollcombe who, at 78, works as a delivery man for a flower shop. He has also been a taxi driver since leaving the Ministry in 1956 after 35 years service, 29 of them at Mimico. The first six years he worked at Burwash where his annual salary was $1,125 for an 11-hour day shift and 13 hours on night duty, with no overtime.

In 1927, he went to Mimico in response to an urgent request from Superintendent Jim Elliott, a friend who needed a records clerk and wanted Harry for the job. He was delighted with his starting salary of $1,400 at Mimico. "I thought it was great to be making that much money," he recalls.

Even though he didn't particularly like the job - "I wasn't cut out to be a clerk" - Harry stuck with it for several years before transferring to the custodial staff.

When the Second World War began, Harry joined a Toronto militia unit so he could stay at Mimico, which was being turned into an internment camp for German prisoners. He was assigned to a special train unit that travelled around the country and picked up prisoners for Mimico.

"The German prisoners would question us extensively about the towns we passed and our destination. They recorded everything in notebooks, I suspect, so they could later make maps."

After the war, Harry was promoted to Sergeant at Mimico and was paid $1,800. One of his most vivid memories is of a dramatic and fatal escape attempt. Two inmates overpowered several staff members and got possession of a set of keys.

The Day Sergeant, who lived in a nearby room where guns were also stored, heard the scuffle and entered the hall carrying a pistol. He ordered the men to stop, but when he was attacked, he fired, killing one of them.

Harry also recalls being involved in a riot at the institution one Christmas Eve when some inmate horseplay resulted in chairs and tables being thrown.

"Being the senior officer on duty, I went into the rest area, pulled out a pad and began to record the names of all inmates I recognized. Soon the fighting stopped and the inmates turned to watch me. I simply turned and left; there was no more trouble."

The death knell for Mimico as a large farming operation was sounded in 1967 when 160 acres (0.6 km^{2}) were sold to the Borough of Etobicoke for an industrial park. And the rest of the property is expected to go for similar use when the Ministry moves out this summer.

The dining hall (formerly the main dormitory building prior to 1948) behind the administration building was torn down and replaced with a dining hall in the basement of Building 2.

1976

Buildings 5 and 6 were built but remained closed.

1981

Buildings 5 and 6 were opened and used to house Intermittent Temporary Absence (day-pass) and intermittent (sentence served on weekends) inmates.

1982

Mimico Correctional Centre was reclassified from minimum-security to medium-security and the perimeter fencing increased from ten feet to twenty-one feet.

1986

Payphones were installed in the inmate dormitories, allowing inmates to place collect-calls.

1988

Building 2 was converted to a 136-bed, medium-security remand unit.

1989

Segregation cells (4) in the basement of Building 1 were closed and replaced with a ten-cell unit at the rear of the building.

1991

The inmate dining hall and kitchen in the basement of Building 2 were closed and replaced with the newly completed 320-seat dining hall.

I.T.A. program was moved completely out of the institution to Community Resource Centres (Halfway-houses).

1993

Ministry of Correctional Services became the Ministry of the Solicitor General and Correctional Services.

Five new cells were opened in the basement of Building 1 in place of the Immigration Dorm (formerly used as a medical isolation dorm when AIDS began to show up in the inmate population).

1994

Mimico Detention Centre was opened for maximum-security remand inmates and Building 2 was closed for renovations. Mimico Correctional Centre became the Mimico Correctional Complex.

1996

The I.T.A. program was moved back into Mimico after the Ministry closed all C.R.C.'s.

(February) Correctional Officers and support staff went on strike for 5 weeks in a bid to improve job security and increase wages that had not kept pace with inflation in over 12 years.

1997

Renovations and staff training began for the conversion of the detention centre (Buildings 2 and 7) into the Toronto Youth Assessment Centre (TYAC).

1998

(January) The Toronto Youth Assessment Centre opened as a separate institution. Mimico Correctional Complex was once again the Mimico Correctional Centre.

1999

(June) The Ministry of the Solicitor General and Correctional Services was divided again into two separate ministries; The Ministry of the Solicitor General and the Ministry of Correctional Services.

2002

The Ministry of the Solicitor General and the Ministry of Correctional Services merged again to become the Ministry of Public Safety and Security.

2003

(January) All but a few regular inmates were transferred out to other correctional centres and Mimico became an Intermittent Inmate facility. Intermittent inmates serve their sentences in instalments, typically on weekends and remain at large in the community the remainder of the time. Initially, the facility was to become a branch of the Toronto Jail and renamed the Toronto Jail Intermittent Facility, but the staff at Mimico rallied successfully to maintain autonomy.

(November) The Ministry of Public Safety and Security was renamed to the Ministry of Community Safety and Correctional Services.

2004

The Toronto Youth Assessment Centre was shut down amidst controversy surrounding the conditions of the facility.

The Ontario Government issued this press release:

March 8, 2004

McGuinty Government Closing Toronto Youth Assessment Centre

Queen's Park — The McGuinty government today announced plans to close the Toronto Youth Assessment Centre by a target date of June 30.

"I've visited the facility and it is totally unsuitable for youth in conflict with the law," said Monte Kwinter, Minister of Community Safety and Correctional Services. "Since then, I have made it a priority to close the centre. We are now following through on that commitment."

During the past few months, the Ministry of Community Safety and Correctional Services has taken a number of steps to reduce the number of youth at the facility, as part of its commitment to closing the centre. Approximately 50 youth are currently at the secure-detention centre. They will be relocated to other youth facilities that are appropriate to their program needs, as an interim measure.

"This government will continue to work to ensure that youth in the province's custody are treated in a humane, safe and secure way," Kwinter added. "By making the decision to close the centre, we are bringing real, positive change to Ontario's youth."

"Youth in conflict with the law must be held accountable for their actions and be dealt with firmly, with a rehabilitative focus," said Dr. Marie Bountrogianni, Minister of Children's Services.

Since 1998, the centre, which is located at the Mimico Correctional Centre in Etobicoke, has been used as a temporary location to hold youth, age 16 or 17 at the time of their offence, either in detention or serving custodial sentences. The McGuinty government is committed to meaningful rehabilitation for youth in conflict with the law, to help build strong, safe and vital communities in Ontario.

2008

On May 9, the Ministry of Community Safety and Correctional Services announces plans to build a new, larger correctional centre on the site of the Mimico Correctional Centre which will replace Mimico, the Toronto Jail, and the Toronto West Detention Centre.

2011

Mimico Correctional Centre closed on December 5, 2011.

Phase 1 of the new facility, the 320 bed Toronto Intermittent Centre is completed and beings accepting prisoners on December 9, 2011.

2012

Mimico Correctional Centre demolished to make room for Phase 2 of the Toronto South Detention Centre which is completed in November.

2014

Toronto South Detention Centre (Phase 2) officially opens on January 29, 2014.

== Notable inmates ==
- Alan Eagleson
- Marvin Elkind

== Movies and television ==
The Mimico Correctional Centre provided the location for numerous movies and television shows including:

- Woman on the Run: The Lawrencia Bembenek Story (1993) (TV)
- The Third Twin (1997) (TV)
- Forever Mine (1999)
- Guilt by Association (2002) (TV)
- Get Rich or Die Tryin' (2005)
- Rebirth (2006)
- PSI Factor: Chronicles of the Paranormal - Television Series
- Exhibit A: Secrets of Forensic Science, Stopwatch Gang segment (1999) - Television Series

== See also ==
- List of youth detention incidents in Canada
- List of correctional facilities in Ontario
- Brookside Youth Centre
- Project Turnaround
- Bluewater Youth Centre
