= Brampton Adult Training Centre =

Prison Ontario, Canada 1947–1979

- Location: Brampton, Ontario, Canada
- Status: Closed
- Security class: Minimum security
- Capacity: Unknown
- Opened: 1947
- Closed: 1979
- Managed by: See text

The Brampton Adult Training Centre was a minimum security correctional facility in Brampton, Ontario, Canada. Opened in 1947, it was originally known as the Ontario Reformatory - Brampton and was managed by the Ontario Department of Reform Institutions, from 1947 to 1968; the Ontario Department of Correctional Services, from 1968 to 1972; and with the Ontario Ministry of Correctional Services, from 1972 until its closure in 1979. The facility accepted inmates between the ages of 16 and 24 who were deemed likely to benefit from vocational and educational programs, instead of the usual work programs offered at other facilities.

== See also ==
- List of correctional facilities in Ontario
