= Laframboise =

Laframboise is a French surname meaning "The raspberry". Most carriers of this surname descend from Joseph Frye, an English colonist from Kittery, Maine, who was captured in an Indian raid in 1695 during King William's War and taken to New France by the First Nations and was baptized into the Catholic faith in Montreal. Notable people of this surname include the following:

- Donna Laframboise, Canadian feminist, writer, photographer
- Magdelaine Laframboise (1780–1846), American fur trader
- Mario Laframboise (born 1957), Canadian politician
- Maurice Laframboise (1821–1882), Canadian lawyer, judge and political figure
- Michel Laframboise (1793–1865), Canadian fur trader in the Oregon Country
- Pete Laframboise (1950–2011), Canadian professional ice hockey player
