= Algoma Treatment and Remand Centre =

Prison in Ontario, Canada

- Interactive map of Algoma Treatment and Remand Centre
- Location: 800 Great Northern Rd Sault Ste. Marie, Ontario P6A 5K7; 46°33′06″N 84°18′57″W
- Status: Operational
- Security class: Medium/Maximum
- Capacity: 140
- Opened: 1990
- Former name: Northern Treatment Centre
- Managed by: Ministry of the Solicitor General

The Algoma Treatment and Remand Centre (formerly Northern Treatment Centre) is a medium/maximum security prison located in Sault Ste. Marie, Ontario, Canada. The entire centre has a capacity of 104 beds.

== Treatment Centre ==
As a Treatment Centre, it provides "specialized and intensive treatment for motivated offenders with clearly identified problems relating to substance abuse, sexual misconduct, impulse control and anger management." The centre is divided into two sections, the treatment centre and the remand centre, which acts as the local correctional centre.

== Incidents and deaths ==
In 2012, 3 hockey players including now NHL player Nick Cousins spent time in the treatment centre after their involvement in the gang-sexual assault of a local woman.

In the spring of 2014, an inmate died of a drug overdose in the centre. A coroner's inquest determined that the inmate died after consuming "crushed up oxycontin and chewing fentanyl from a patch". As corrections officers at the time were limited to a visible strip search and were unable to perform a cavity search, It was determined that the inmate had "hooped" the drugs and smuggled them into the prison.

In the Fall of 2018, ex-NHL player Theo Fleury visited the prison, to speak to inmates about healing in relation to his experiences with abuse, addictions and mental health.

In January 2019, a riot broke out in the prison.

== See also ==
- List of correctional facilities in Ontario
