= Brockville Jail =

Jail in Ontario, Canada

- Interactive map of Brockville Jail
- Location: Brockville, Ontario; 44.590968°N 75.685689°W
- Status: Operational
- Security class: Maximum security
- Capacity: 48
- Opened: 1842
- Managed by: Ministry of the Solicitor General

The Brockville Jail is a jail in Brockville, Ontario operated by the provincial Ministry of the Solicitor General. It is the oldest operational jail in the province.

On August 27, 2020 the Government of Ontario announced funding for a new facility to replace the Brockville Jail as part of a larger project to renovate and replace prisons in eastern Ontario. The new 66-bed facility, to be called the Brockville Correctional Complex, will be constructed on the grounds of the St. Lawrence Valley Correctional and Treatment Centre.

== See also ==
- List of correctional facilities in Ontario
