= Toronto South Detention Centre =

Correctional facility in Toronto, Canada

Coordinates: 43.610°N 79.516°W

- Interactive map of Toronto South Detention Centre
- Location: Toronto, Ontario, Canada
- Status: Operational
- Security class: Medium to maximum
- Capacity: 1,650 (maximum security) + 320 (medium security)
- Population: 1,670 (2019)
- Opened: January 29, 2014
- Managed by: Ministry of the Solicitor General

The Toronto South Detention Centre is a correctional facility in the district of Etobicoke in Toronto, Ontario, Canada. It is a Government of Ontario-operated maximum-security correctional facility for adult male inmates serving a sentence of up to 2-years-less-a-day, and individuals who have been remanded into custody while awaiting trial. It is built on the site of the former Mimico Correctional Centre, which closed in 2011 and whose origins dated back to 1887. The Toronto South Detention Centre officially opened on January 29, 2014 replacing the Toronto Jail, the Toronto West Detention Centre, and the demolished Mimico Correctional Centre.

== Facilities ==
The facility consists of two parts; A maximum-security building that can house up to 1,650 remanded accused awaiting trial, and a medium-security building, known as the Toronto Intermittent Centre (TIC) that can house up to 320 inmates serving primarily weekend or other intermittent sentences. The maximum-security building is the first in Ontario to be constructed from prefabricated concrete cells that can be stacked with a minimal support structure. Designed by Zeidler Partnership Architects, the modular cell units were built and shipped from Tindall Corporation facility in Atlanta, Georgia.

== History ==
On May 9, 2008, the then Ministry of Community Safety and Correctional Services announced plans to build a new, larger correctional centre on the site of the Mimico Correctional Centre, which would replace the Mimico Correctional Centre, the Toronto (Don) Jail, and the Toronto West Detention Centre. The existing correctional centre closed on December 5, 2011, and Phase 1 of the new facility, the 320-bed Toronto Intermittent Centre began accepting prisoners on December 9, 2011. The old correctional centre buildings were then demolished to make room for Phase 2 of the Toronto South Detention Centre, which was completed in November 2012. The Toronto South Detention Centre (Phase 2) officially opened on January 29, 2014.

== Operational problems ==
The facility is currently, as of June 2015, operating at half capacity with approximately 800 inmates. Nevertheless, due to staffing shortages, lockdowns have been more frequent than in other provincial jails occurring each weekend and frequently during the week as well and the centre's infirmary and gymnasium have remained closed since the facility became operational in 2014. The facility's mental health assessment unit did not become operational until after two inmates died in custody in February 2015, one by suicide and another due to a drug overdose.

== Notable inmates ==
- Peter Nygard - Finnish-Canadian fashion designer was incarcerated there while awaiting his trial for sex crimes.
- Top5 - Canadian rapper released from custody in 2024 after he was cleared of murder charges stemming from a 2021 shooting.

== See also ==
- List of correctional facilities in Ontario
