= North Bay Jail =

Prison in Ontario, Canada

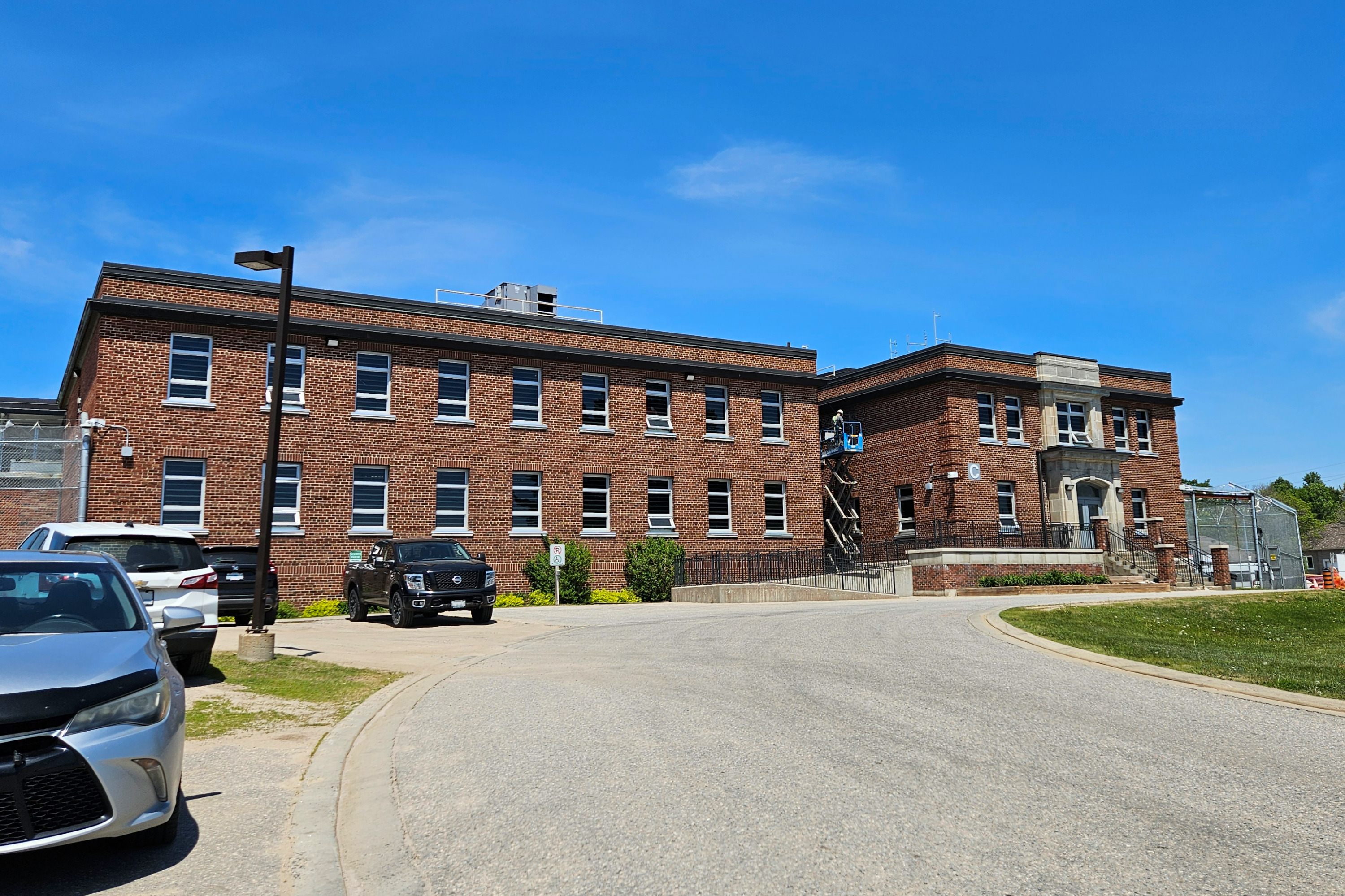

- Location within Ontario
- Location: North Bay, Ontario, Canada; 46.323962°N 79.433841°W
- Status: Operational
- Security class: Maximum
- Capacity: 121
- Opened: 1930
- Managed by: Ministry of Community Safety and Correctional Services

The North Bay Jail is a jail located in North Bay, Ontario, Canada.

The 121-bed maximum-security facility houses male and female offenders awaiting trial, sentencing, transfer to federal and provincial correctional facilities, immigration hearings or deportation, or serving sentences under 120 days (4 months)

The North Bay Jail also infamously held Canadian singer and Hedley frontman Jacob Hoggard briefly during his sexual misconduct trial in late 2024.

== See also ==
List of correctional facilities in Ontario
