= Belleville Jail =

Maximum-security jail in Ontario, Canada

- Interactive map of Belleville Jail
- Location: Belleville, Ontario, Canada; 44.16706553°N 77.38012705°W
- Status: Closed
- Security class: Maximum
- Opened: 1838
- Closed: 1971
- Managed by: Ministry of Community Safety and Correctional Services

The Belleville Jail, (or Gaol), located in Belleville, Ontario, Canada, was a maximum-security facility housing offenders awaiting trial, sentencing, transfer to federal and provincial correctional facilities, immigration hearings or deportation, and less frequently, those serving short sentences (under 90 days). The jail opened in 1838 as the Hastings County Jail (it was renamed when the province took control of county jails) and closed in 1971, being replaced by the Quinte Detention Centre in the town of Napanee.

== See also ==
- List of correctional facilities in Ontario
