= Bracebridge Jail =

Jail in Ontario, Canada 1882–1946

- Location: Bracebridge, Ontario, Canada
- Status: Closed
- Security class: Maximum
- Opened: 1882
- Closed: 1946
- Managed by: See main text

The Bracebridge Jail, historically also referred to as the Bracebridge Gaol, located in Bracebridge, Ontario, Canada, was a maximum-security facility housing offenders awaiting trial, sentencing, transfer to federal and provincial correctional facilities, immigration hearings or deportation, and less frequently, those serving short sentences (under 90 days). The jail opened in 1882 and closed in 1946. The jail was operated by the local municipality under the Office of the Inspector of Prisons and Public Charities (1882–1934), and the Reformatories and Prisons Branch of the Department of the Provincial Secretary (1934–1946), precursors to the modern Ministry of Community Safety and Correctional Services.

== See also ==
- List of correctional facilities in Ontario
