= Brantford Jail =

Jail in Ontario, Canada

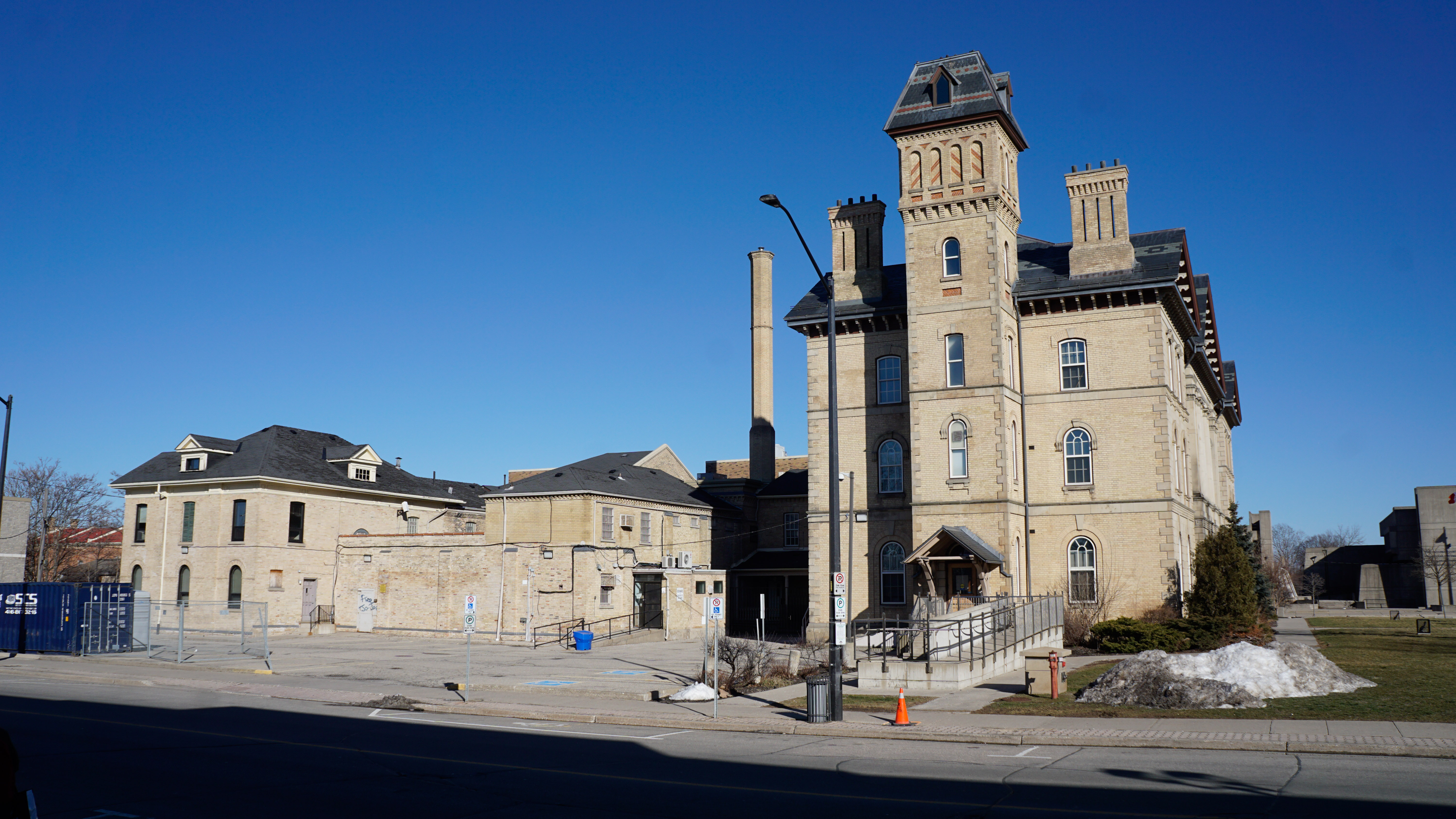
- Interactive map of Brantford Jail
- Location: Brantford, Ontario; 43.14196°N 80.26325°W
- Status: Closed
- Capacity: 90
- Closed: 2017
- Managed by: Ministry of Community Safety and Correctional Services

The Brantford Jail was a jail in downtown Brantford, Ontario. It was closed in December 2017. It is set to reopen by June 2028

It was slated for closure in 2012, along with the Chatham Jail and the Toronto West Detention Centre.

== See also ==
- List of correctional facilities in Ontario
