= Donna Laframboise =

Canadian photographer and writer

Donna Laframboise is a Canadian investigative journalist, writer, and photographer. She has published critical reviews of the Intergovernmental Panel on Climate Change and its reports for the United Nations.

== Background ==
Laframboise has worked as a freelance photographer and journalist. She describes herself as a libertarian feminist, and earned a bachelors degree in women's studies at the University of Toronto in 1989. Laframboise has written articles and editorials for Canada's National Post, The Globe and Mail, Toronto Star, and others. In 1992, she asked for reconsideration of the guilty verdict for Guy Paul Morin, who had been wrongly convicted of the 1984 rape and murder of a nine-year-old girl. He was sentenced to life in prison in 1992. Renewed DNA testing led to overturning of this verdict in 1995. From 1993 to 2001, Laframbroise served on the board of directors of the Canadian Civil Liberties Association.

In 1997, Laframbroise published The Princess at the Window: A New Gender Morality, a book critical of many aspects of contemporary feminism. Gender studies scholar Joan Sangster went so far to call Laframboise an "anti-feminist", and dismissed her "frontal attack" on abuse accusations against Grandview Training School for Girls staff in the 1990s.

== Publications on the global warming controversy ==
Laframboise is an outspoken critic of the scientific assessment of global warming published by the Intergovernmental Panel on Climate Change (IPCC). In 2010, she commented on the outcome of the Climatic Research Unit email controversy enquiries, echoing the complaints of others such as the Global Warming Policy Foundation.

In 2010, Laframboise organized a "citizen audit" of the IPCC Fourth Assessment Report, to determine how many of the report's sources were peer-reviewed. The audit claims that 21 of the report's 44 chapters used fewer than 60% peer-reviewed sources, with the other sources being non-peer-reviewed material, commonly called "grey literature". The IPCC has clear guidelines allowing the use of non peer-reviewed grey literature where appropriate, subject to evaluation by the IPCC authors. An IPCC spokesman has stated that such sources include government statistics or reports from industry associations, and said "We do not believe that it is appropriate to keep out such material from the process."

In 2011, she published a book about the Intergovernmental Panel on Climate Change, The Delinquent Teenager Who Was Mistaken for the World's Top Climate Expert, applying the metaphor of delinquency to the Panel. She promotes her perspective on Global warming on her noconsensus.org blog. Laframboise claims that the IPCC's appeal to authority doesn't live up to its own promises, but a review of her book rejects her conclusions about the evidence for climate change.

== IPCC Fifth Assessment Report ==
In 2013, Laframboise received leaked drafts of the IPCC Fifth Assessment Report WG II section on Impacts, Adaptation and Vulnerability, and commented on them on her blog. She wrote that NGOs like the World Wide Fund for Nature, Conservation International and Germanwatch had provided comments based on grey literature, to push a political agenda. IPCC Spokesman Jonathan Lynn commented that the data leak broke a confidentiality agreement which did not have legal force. Authors of the report also included industry representatives such as the insurer Munich Re and the oil company ExxonMobil.

== Writing ==
- The Delinquent Teenager Who Was Mistaken for the World's Top Climate Expert (2011). ISBN 9781466453487
- Into the Dustbin: Rajendra Pachauri, the Climate Report & the Nobel Peace Prize. Amazon CreateSpace Publishing, 2013. ISBN 1492292400
