= Brant Haldimand Norfolk Catholic District School Board =

School board in Ontario, Canada

Location
- 322 Fairview Drive; Brantford, Ontario Brant, Haldimand, and Norfolk Counties Canada
- Coordinates: 43°10′14″N 80°15′26″W

District information
- Chair of the board: Rick Petrella
- Director of education: Michael McDonald
- Schools: 28 Elementary; 3 Secondary
- Budget: CA$121.4 million (2016 - 2017)
- District ID: B67164

Students and staff
- Students: 9,590

Other information
- Elected trustees: 6
- Website: www.bhncdsb.ca

The Brant Haldimand Norfolk Catholic District School Board (BHNCDSB, known as English-language Separate District School Board No. 51 prior to 1999) is a separate school board in Ontario, Canada. The school board is the school district administrator for the communities of the County of Brant, Haldimand County, and Norfolk County, Ontario.

== History ==
The Brant Haldimand Norfolk Catholic District School Board was a merger of two school boards, the Haldimand-Norfolk Roman Catholic Separate School Board and the Brant County Roman Catholic Separate School Board. The two boards merged in 1998 into a new board English-language Separate District School Board No. 51 and became known as the Brant Haldimand Norfolk Catholic District School Board. French schools operated by Le conseil des écoles séparées catholiques de Haldimand-Norfolk and Le conseil des écoles séparées catholiques du comté de Brant became part of French-language Separate District School Board No. 64 which became later known as the Conseil scolaire de district catholique Centre-Sud.

== Elementary schools ==
- Blessed Sacrament
- Christ the King
- Holy Cross
- Holy Family
- Madonna Della Libera, Brantford
- Notre Dame, Brantford
- Notre Dame, Caledonia
- Our Lady of Fatima
- Our Lady of Providence
- Resurrection
- Sacred Heart, Langton
- Sacred Heart, Paris
- St. Basil
- St. Bernard of Clairvaux
- St. Cecilia
- St. Frances Cabrini
- St. Gabriel
- St. Joseph's
- St. Leo
- St. Mary's, Hagersville
- St. Michael's, Dunnville
- St. Michael's, Walsh
- St. Patrick's, Caledonia
- St. Patrick, Brantford
- St. Peter
- St. Pius X
- St. Stephen's
- St. Theresa

== Secondary schools ==
- Assumption College, Brantford
- Holy Trinity Catholic High School, Simcoe
- Sprucedale Secondary School, Simcoe (educational programming for young offenders held at Sprucedale Youth Centre)
- St. Mary's Catholic Learning Centre, Brantford
- St. John's College, Brantford

== See also ==
- Education in Ontario
- List of school districts in Ontario
- List of high schools in Ontario
