= Chatham Jail =

Prison in Ontario, Canada (closed 2014)

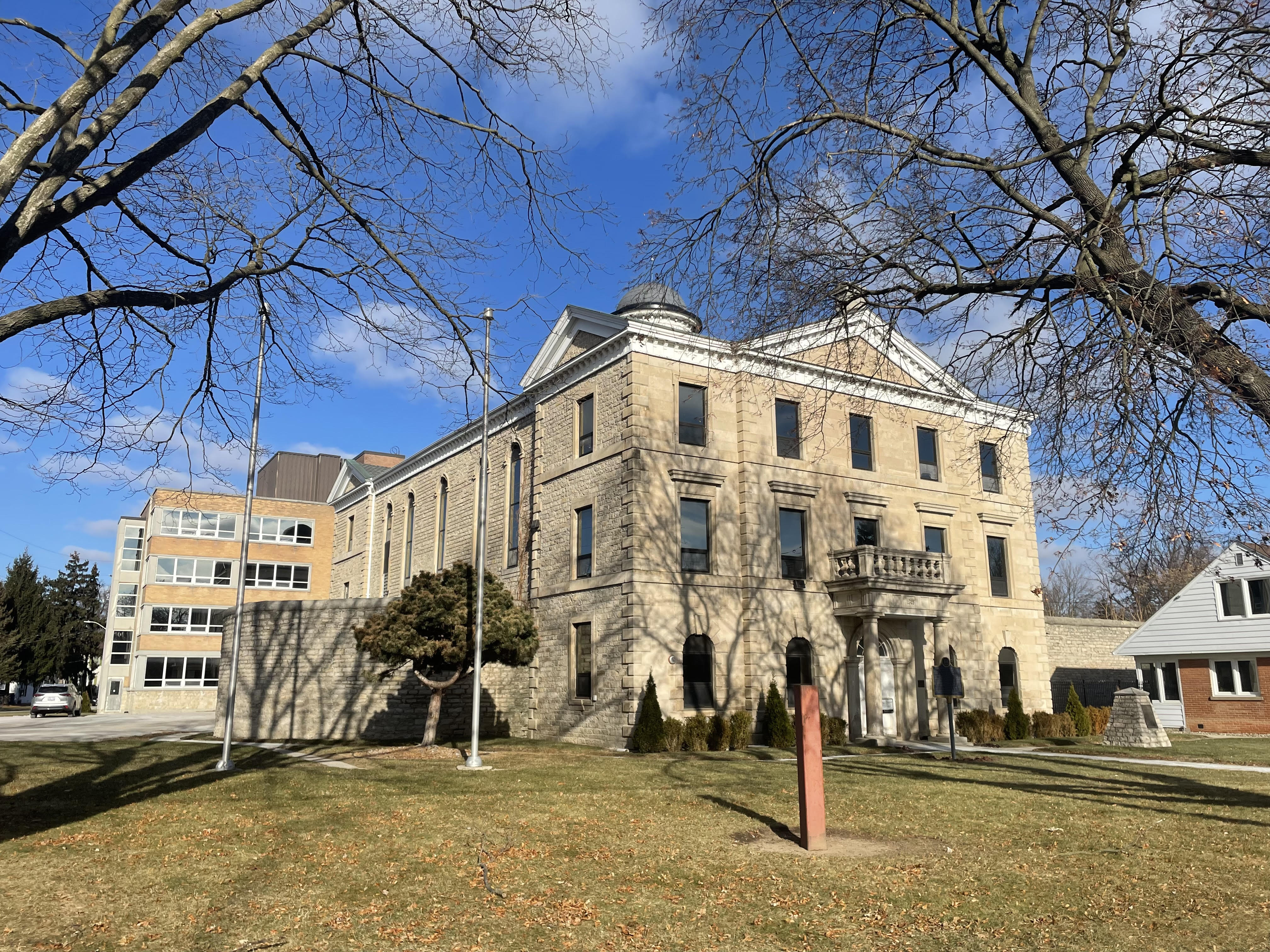
- The former Kent County Courthouse and Jail Building as seen in December 2025
- Interactive map of Chatham Jail
- Location: 17 Seventh Ave, Chatham, Ontario, Canada; 42.40972°N 82.17986°W
- Status: Closed
- Security class: Correctional Facility
- Closed: May 16, 2014
- Managed by: Ministry of Community Safety and Correctional Services

The Chatham Jail was an adult jail located at 17 7th Ave at the corner of Stanley Ave in Chatham, Ontario, Canada. The jail closed May 16, 2014. The Chatham Jail along with the Windsor Jail were replaced by the South West Detention Centre in Maidstone (Windsor) Ontario.

== History ==
The building, together with the Kent County Courthouse, was designed by Canadian architect William Thomas. The Neoclassical limestone building was completed in 1850, and features a balustraded balcony, a prominent pediment and a crowning cupola. While it was being built, the future Canadian Prime Minister Alexander Mackenzie worked on its construction as a stone mason. The court is no longer in use.

== See also ==
- List of correctional facilities in Ontario
