= Project Turnaround =

Private youth detention centre

- Interactive map of Project Turnaround
- Location: Hillsdale, Ontario, Canada; 44.6297°N 79.7232°W
- Status: Closed
- Capacity: 32
- Opened: July 31, 1997
- Closed: January 31, 2004
- Managed by: Encourage Youth Corporation

Project Turnaround was a private youth detention centre for male young offenders between 16 and 18 years of age that operated from 1997 to 2004 in Hillsdale, Ontario, Canada. The facility held up to 32 high-risk youths at a time who were serving sentences for crimes such as assault, robbery, forcible confinement, escape, and weapons charges. Youth serving sentences for crimes such as murder, arson, and sexual assault were not eligible for admission to Project Turnaround. The program had an annual budget of CA$2.3 million.

== History ==
Project Turnaround operated on a boot camp approach, part of a tough on crime response to increasing youth incarceration rates by the government of Premier Mike Harris. Solicitor General Bob Runciman stated that Project Turnaround was "about getting people up at six o'clock in the morning [and] reducing the kind of privileges [young offenders] have currently across the system." Harris' campaign in the 1995 provincial election explicitly used the term "boot camps" to refer to plans for strict youth detention facilities, but the provincial government and Encourage Youth Corporation both later objected to that label being applied to Project Turnaround.

Youth held in the facility were subjected to high-intensity daily activities that lasted approximately 16 hours under a program of military-style discipline. The program—designed to be "more than a boot camp" according to Project Turnaround owner Sally Walker in a 2003 interview— was meant to instill respect and accountability, build productive skills, and offer educational and vocational programming to those who were predicted to re-offend. The provincial government touted the program as a success, reporting that the rate of recidivism among youth who had been through Project Turnaround was 33 percent compared to 50 percent at public youth centres, and Public Security Minister Bob Runciman announced a plan in 2003 to expand the strict-discipline youth detention model across the province. Other researchers, such as University of Toronto criminologist Anthony Doob, stated those claims were not shown by the government's own data and that youths passing through Project Turnaround were not any less likely to re-offend.

In February 2003 the establishment had a mould outbreak requiring temporary transfer of 24 offenders to other provincial institutions. Following the change of government in the 2003 provincial election, new Minister of Community Safety and Correctional Services Monte Kwinter announced that the contract for Project Turnaround would not be renewed. Kwinter cited the high cost and small population of the program as the reason for the decision and stated that youth correctional services would be better provided through government-run programs. In a December 2003 interview, Walker disagreed that the program did not provide value for money and claimed that Project Turnaround was under-capacity due to judges being more lenient on youth following changes to the Youth Criminal Justice Act.

All youth at Project Turnaround were relocated to public youth detention centres in December 2003 and the facility was formally closed on January 31, 2004.

== See also ==
- List of youth detention center incidents in Ontario
- List of youth detention centre incidents in Canada
- List of provincial correctional facilities in Ontario
- Brookside Youth Centre
- Sprucedale Youth Centre
- Bluewater Youth Centre
