= King Street Gaol (1824) =

Demolished jail in Toronto, Canada

Coordinates: 43.64984°N 79.37579°W

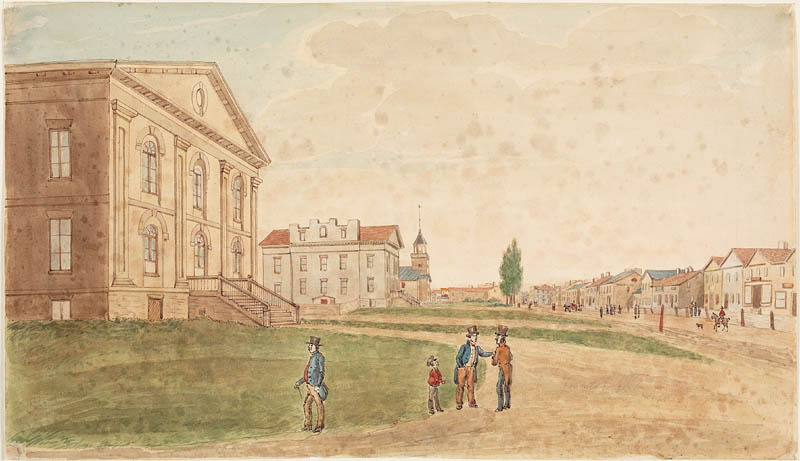
Court House and Jail, August 1829

The second King Street Gaol (also known as the Toronto Jail) was built in 1824 to replace the first King Street Gaol in York, Upper Canada (now Toronto). At that time, the town needed a larger, better constructed jail to replace the original, which was little more than a plain log building with a stockade.

The new two-storey brick building was built two blocks east on the north-east corner of King Street and Toronto Street with a wooden stockade enclosing its gallows.

After the jail closed, the building was used as an insane asylum, then incorporated into the York Chambers Building. The facade of old jail could still be seen from the side and was eventually demolished in 1957. At one point the jail and old courthouse was part of a proposed Guild Hall complex, but the project was later abandoned. The current site is now Courthouse Park and old Court House (or Adelaide Street Courthouse) to the north still stands.

== Hangings ==
In 1838, rebel leaders Samuel Lount and Peter Matthews were hanged at the jail for their participation in the Upper Canada Rebellion of 1837. Joseph Sheard, before becoming mayor, was the foreman for the jail and was expected to share in the work of building the scaffold. He refused, saying, "I'll not put a hand to it ... Lount and Matthews have done nothing that I might not have done myself, and I'll never help build a gallows to hang them."

== See also ==
- List of correctional facilities in Ontario
