= James Patton (Canadian politician) =

Canadian politician and lawyer (1824–1888)

James Patton QC (June 10, 1824 – October 11, 1888) was a Canadian political figure and lawyer who served briefly as a cabinet minister in the government of the Province of Canada prior to the Canadian Confederation.

== Private life ==
James Patton was born in 1824 in Prescott, Upper Canada. He was the fourth and youngest son of Major Andrew Patton, a veteran of the early battles of the Napoleonic Wars who was at the time the ordnance storekeeper at Fort Wellington, at Prescott, and later the registrar of Grenville country. Patton moved to Toronto as a toddler when Major Patton was appointed barrack master at Toronto.

He was educated at the Upper Canada College, and in 1840 commenced working as a law student at the law office of John Hillyard Cameron when he was 16. He enrolled at King's College (predecessor of the University of Toronto) upon its opening in 1843, and received a Bachelor of Laws and Commerce degree in 1847 and a Doctor of Laws in 1858.

In 1853 Patton married Martha Marietta Hooker of Prescott, who survived him and lived until 1907. He died in Toronto on October 11, 1888.

== Legal career ==
Patton was called to the Bar in 1845 and he settled in Barrie in Simcoe County. From 1853 to 1858, he was in partnership with Hewitt Bernard, until Bernard was appointed Deputy Minister of Justice. In 1859 he was elected a bencher of the Law Society of Upper Canada, and later became a life bencher by nature of having served as the Solicitor-General. He was appointed a Queen’s Counsel in 1862.

In 1860 he opened a branch office in Toronto, which became the prominent law firm Patton, Osler and Moss in 1861 when he was joined by Featherston Osler, a former law student of his and then a judge of the Common Pleas, and Thomas Moss who was the Chief Justice of the Court of Appeals.

After having served briefly in the cabinet of John A. Macdonald in 1862, he was asked by Macdonald to take charge of his legal business in Kingston upon Macdonald's return to power in 1864. Their business partnership continued until 1878, when he accepted the position of general manager of the English and Scottish Investment Company of Canada and retired from the active legal practice.

== Political service ==
Patton was involved with the Conservative Party from an early age. The party did not have a mouthpiece press outlet north of Toronto when he started his legal his business in Barrie. In 1852, he founded the Barrie Herald to fill this void, and ran it personally for two years. The Herald and its Liberal rival the Barrie Magnet Reform were the only newspapers published north of Toronto at the time. He was also the publisher of the Canadian Constables’ Assistant, and was one of the founders and editors of the Upper Canada Law Journal.

In 1856, elections for seats in the legislative council (the predecessor of the Senate) was held for the first time. Twelves of its forty-eight seats were to be up for election on rotation every two years. Patton stood for election for the Saugeen electoral division (composed of the counties of Bruce, Grey and South Simcoe). He was elected and served until 1862.

On March 27, 1862, he joined the Cartier-Macdonald ministry of the Province of Canada as Solicitor General for Canada West. His time in cabinet was however very brief, as the Conservative government collapsed less than two months later on May 23 when eleven of the approximately twenty-five members of Cartier's Parti Bleu voted against the government. Patter retired from electoral politics at that juncture. In his brief tenure, he was able to introduced more stringent professional training standards for lawyers, including the introduction of bar exams as requirement in addition to completion of articles.

He was however not done with the policies relating to the legal profession. When he was active in the affairs of the Conservative Party in the 1850s, he was an advocate for the establishment offices for county attorneys and the political appointment of local lawyers to these lucrative offices. By the time Macdonald return to power in 1864, Patton was among the loudest voice condemning their incompetence and delinquency in their administrative duties: in 1863 and 1864 the government had to cover the defalcations of four such officers.

In 1881, Patton was appointed the Collector of Customs at Toronto, a key government appointment he held until his death.

=== The politics of the University of Toronto ===
Patton was deeply involved in Egerton Ryerson's intrigues to reverse the secularization of the University of Toronto under the Reform government of Robert Baldwin. As an alumnus of King's College and key member of the Conservative Party, he was a powerful ally to Ryerson's push to steer government funding away from the University College to the denomination colleges. He was the president of the University Association (a precursor of its alumni association) when the then Prince of Wales, later King Edward VII, visited the university. In 1860 as a member of the university senate, he got himself elected as vice-chancellor of the university, defeating incumbent John Langton, the Auditor of the Province of Canada, while Langton was in Quebec on government business. A royal commission was appointed to provide recommendations on the funding dispute between the university and the denominational colleges. Patton as vice-chancellor was appointed as its chair and was expected to represent the interest of the university. Instead the commission he led recommended that University College be limited to $28,000 funding a year while the affiliated colleges would each be given $60,000 to enlarge their premises and maintain their libraries. Adam Crook, later a finance minister and education minister in post confederation Liberal ministries, who had succeeded Patton as president of the University Association, condemned the commissioners for dealing with matters which they were not authorised to deal with and "had set forth a scheme, which, if carried out, could result in nothing less than an entire dismemberment of the endowment and destruction of the University." Patton attempted to block Crooks' subsequent efforts in raising the matter at the university senate but was out voted at every turn. He was replaced by Crooks in the post in 1864.

== Works cited ==
- Brockville Recorder (1913-12-04). "Hon. James Patton". Prescott Journal.
- The Canadian biographical dictionary and portrait gallery of eminent and self-made men. American Biographical Pub. Co. 1880. ISBN 0665085451.
- Côté, Joseph Olivier; Côté, Narcisse Omer (1918). Political Appointments and Elections in the Province of Canada, 1841 to 1865 (with supplementary Appendix 1866 to 1867). Quebec: St. Michel and Darveau.
- Friedland, Martin L. (2013). The University of Toronto, A History. University of Toronto Press. ISBN 9781442615366.

Preceded by Joseph Curran Morrison	Solicitor General for Canada West; 1862	Succeeded by Adam Wilson
New seat	Legislative Councillor for Saugeeen; 1856–62	Succeeded by John McMurrich
