= Margaret Mick =

Margaret Ann Mick (June 1, 1860 - May 25, 1925) was the first female Canadian peace officer to be killed in the line of duty, and the first woman to be added to the memorial commemorating fallen police or peace officers near Parliament Hill in Ottawa, Ontario, Canada.

== Early life ==
Mick was born June 1, 1860, in Waterdown, Canada West (now Hamilton, Ontario), a small town west of Toronto. In the early 1880s, she married James Mick, with whom she had four children (one died in infancy). When James died in the late 1890s, Mick moved with her three children to Toronto, where she went to work as a matron in the Andrew Mercer Reformatory for Women. Her position was similar to that of a correctional officer today. In 1916, she applied for a transfer to the Toronto Municipal Jail Farm for Women in Concord. The facility was considered state of the art for its time. It put low-risk female offenders to work growing fruits and vegetables and raising livestock.

== Death ==
On Sunday, May 25, 1925, Mick arrived for work at 8:00 PM, unaware that three inmates planned an escape. Mick would be the only staff member on duty throughout the night.

At about 10:15 PM, while Mick was taking clean baby bottles to the maternity wing, 16-year-old Jennie McMinn was able to force open and squeeze through a hinged window in her cell door. Then, using a spoon that she had smuggled from the cafeteria, she forced the lock on a second inmate's cell. The two of them waited while a third complained loudly about a water leak in her cell. As Mick was opening the third inmate's cell to investigate, she was jumped from behind by the two lying in wait. She was beaten, throttled, and dragged to a small utility room and tied to pipes while unconscious. The next morning, she was found dead when the next shift came on duty, still tied spread-eagle to the pipes. The official cause of death was ruled as assault.

Her three assailants were soon caught and convicted of their crimes. They each served five years in the Toronto (Don) Jail. Five other conspirators were convicted of aiding and abetting the crime and also served short sentences in the Toronto (Don) Jail.

== Remembrance ==
During the 1st Session, 38th Parliament, on Tuesday, June 14, 2005, the Honourable Lorna Milne spoke of Margaret Mick's life and death and had this to say about the woman:

Margaret Ann Mick was an uncommon woman who showed uncommon bravery, both personally and professionally. In a time long before the support provided by the modern social services system, she managed to keep her family together after her husband's death. In those days, many women were forced to give their children up for adoption in such circumstances, but her determination would not allow that. She built her career and kept her family close to her, decades before that became the norm.

Mick was 64 years old at the time of her death. A surprise party had been arranged for her birthday, less than a week later on June 1, 1925. She was survived by two sons, a daughter, and a sister. Mick is buried at the Union Cemetery in Waterdown, Ontario.

== See also ==
- List of Canadian correctional workers who have died in the line of duty
