= TWDC =

TWDC may refer to:

- The Walt Disney Company, an American multinational entertainment and media conglomerate
- Tyne and Wear Development Corporation, in England
- Toronto West Detention Centre, in Toronto, Canada
