= Elgin-Middlesex Detention Centre =

Prison in Ontario, Canada

Coordinates: 42.9208°N 81.2241°W

- Interactive map of Elgin-Middlesex Detention Centre
- Location: London, Ontario, Canada
- Status: Operational
- Security class: Maximum
- Capacity: 353
- Opened: 1977
- Managed by: Ministry of the Solicitor General

The Elgin-Middlesex Detention Centre (EMDC) is a maximum security provincial jail located on the outskirts of London, Ontario. Opened in 1977, the facility is operated by the province of Ontario, serving the region of Southwestern Ontario.

The prison, known regionally for its harsh conditions and numerous deaths in custody, is often described as "overcrowded, unsanitary and dangerous". Although EMDC currently has capacity to house a maximum of 353 inmates, the facility routinely operates beyond this limit. Approximately 70% of EMDC prisoners are awaiting trial and presumptively innocent.

EMDC's 22,000 square foot Regional Intermittent Centre (RIC) was opened in 2016 to allow inmates serving intermittent sentences to be held separately from the general prison population. Despite shuttering the RIC Centre in 2021, the Ford government later announced its intention to reopen the facility by 2026 in order to address overcrowding.

== Prison conditions and deaths ==
EMDC has frequently made local and regional headlines due to persistent concerns about the security of the inmates at the prison as well as prison overcrowding. The prison has been nicknamed "the devil's playground". At least 23 individuals have died while incarcerated at EMDC between 2009 and 2024:

1. Randy Drysdale (April 25, 2009)
2. Laura Straughan (November 13, 2009)
3. Adam Kargus (October 31, 2013)
4. Keith Patterson (September 29, 2014)
5. Jamie High (December 23, 2014)
6. Floyd Deleary (August 23, 2015)
7. Justin Thompson (October 31, 2016)
8. Raymond George Major (June 6, 2017)
9. Michael Fall (July 30, 2017)
10. Murray Davis (August 17, 2017)
11. Ronald Jenkins (December 9, 2017)
12. Justin Struthers (December 26, 2017)
13. James Pigeau (January 7, 2018)
14. Sean William Tourand-Brightman (March 31, 2019)
15. Chase Blanchard (June 22, 2019)
16. Malcolm Ripley (November 25, 2020)
17. Tyler Lancha (March 21, 2021)
18. Clayton (Danny) Bissonnette (March 24, 2021)
19. Brandon Marchant (July 6, 2021)
20. Ronald Jack (September 13, 2022)
21. Jamie Briggs (November 16, 2022)
22. Bryan Michael Myers (February 16, 2024)
23. Matthew Bouvier (October 24, 2024)

Inmates' deaths have ranged from natural causes (e.g. pneumonia) to suicide, homicide, and drug overdose. In 2018, a consolidated class action lawsuit was filed on behalf of 10,000 inmates against the Government of Ontario, alleging that the dangerous conditions at EMDC amounted to systemic negligence and violated inmates' Charter rights. The lawsuit initially sought $325 million in damages, but was settled for $32.7 million in September 2023.

In 2018, family and friends of prisoners who died in EMDC custody began erecting memorial crosses on property opposite the facility's main entrance. Prison staff repeatedly complained that this "constant reminder of traumatic and tragic circumstances" negatively impacted their mental health and created an unsafe work environment. In 2021, the union representing EMDC staff successfully sought an order from the Ontario Grievance Settlement Board to have the memorial removed on the basis that the crosses posed "an unacceptable risk to the psychological health and safety of staff members at the facility." Then-Solicitor General Sylvia Jones confirmed that the memorial had been dismantled shortly thereafter.

In early 2020, the jury in an inquest into two deaths at EMDC in 2015 and 2016 (Floyd Deleary and Justin Thompson) recommended the complete replacement of EMDC with another facility.

On May 14, 2024, the province announced an inquest into the deaths of eight men at EMDC (Clayton Bissonette, Chase Blanchard, Ronald Jenkins, Raymond George Major, James Pigeau, Malcolm Ripley, Justin Struthers, and Sean William Tourand-Brightman) between 2017 and 2021. Days before its scheduled start date in October 2024, the Ministry of the Solicitor General applied to have the scope of the inquest narrowed. The proceedings were subsequently postponed with no specified return date.

== See also ==
- List of correctional facilities in Ontario
