= Grandview Training School for Girls =

Canadian reform school a.k.a. Ontario Training School for Girls, Galt

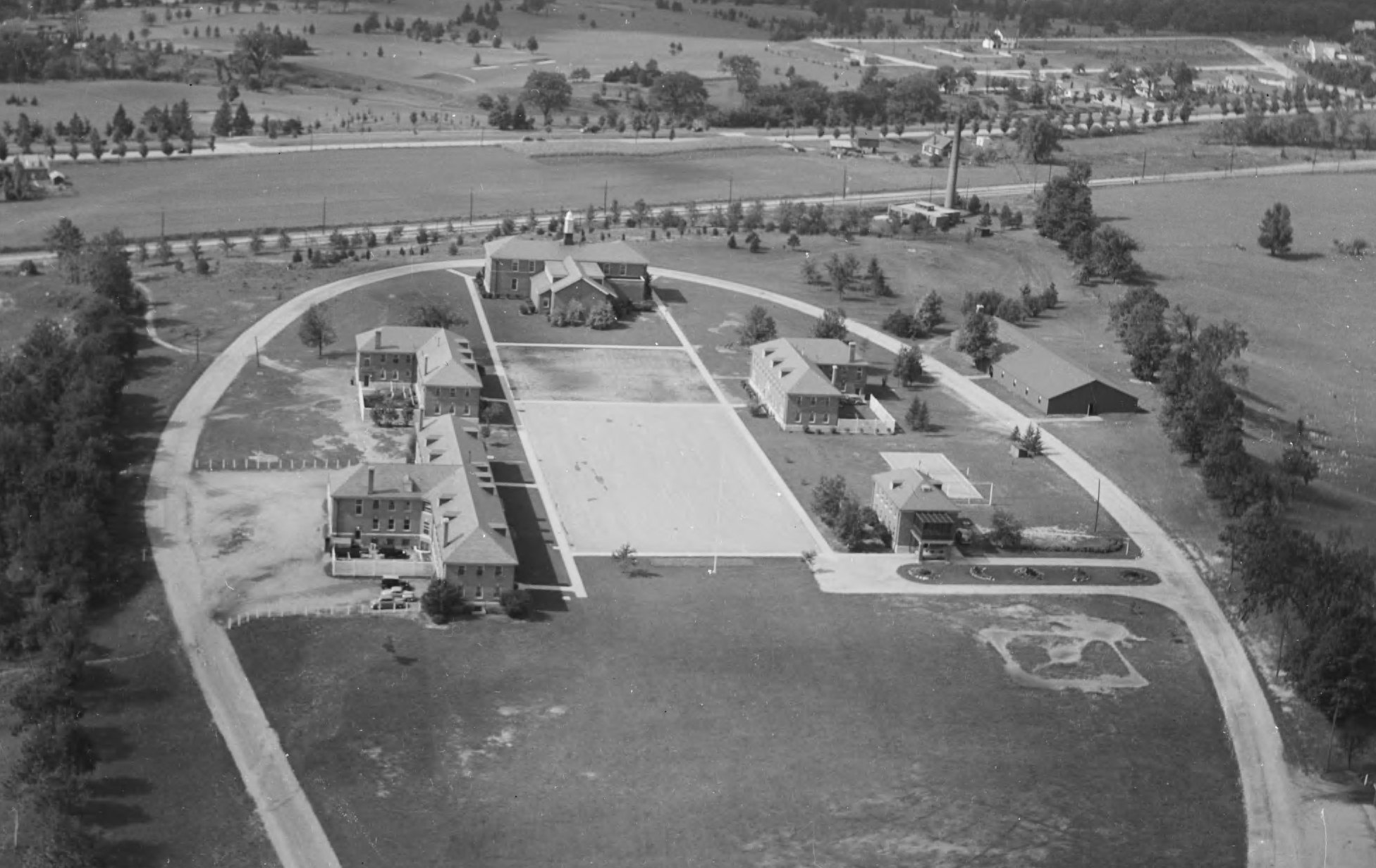
- Aerial view of the school grounds c. 1953. The administration building and auditorium are located toward the top of the image.
- Interactive map of Grandview Training School for Girls
- Location: Galt, Ontario, Canada; 43.3823°N 80.3258°W
- Status: Closed
- Opened: 1933
- Closed: 1976
- Former name: Ontario Training School for Girls - Galt

The Grandview Training School for Girls (known as the Ontario Training School for Girls - Galt prior to 1967) was established in 1933, in Galt, Ontario, Canada, as the first provincially run reform school for incorrigible and delinquent girls aged 12 to 18. The girls became wards of the province and the parents relinquished their rights as guardians. The facility housed an average of 120 girls annually, with 30 or so held in a secure facility known as Churchill House. Girls were typically sentenced under the federal Juvenile Delinquents Act (JDA, 1908) and the provincial Training School Act (TSA, 1931, 1939). The so-called "training school" was created primarily to rehabilitate working-class girls perceived to be destined for adult criminality. While many of the girls had committed minor crimes, many were sent to the facility because they had been pronounced "unmanageable" under the Juvenile Delinquents Act for reasons such as truancy, drug or alcohol use, or "sexual immorality".

The school consisted of five brick buildings situated on 72 acres of land. Following the closure of the facility in 1976, many former residents came forward with accusations of physical, sexual, and psychological abuse by the staff. The abuse didn't become publicly known, however, until 1991, when two women who were being treated by the same psychologist each told him of very similar experiences of abuse that occurred while they were incarcerated at Grandview. The psychologist introduced the two women to each other and they subsequently made appearances on television, asking others who had been at Grandview to contact the police or the provincial government. In the summer of 1991, the Ontario Provincial Police and Waterloo Regional Police Service began a joint investigation into the allegations.

In December 1992, in order to assist those who had come forward, a Victim Witness Program was established in Kitchener, Ontario. At about the same time, a small group of women, which would later expand to over 300, created the Grandview Survivor's Support Group to investigate collective compensation.

In 1999, then Member of Provincial Parliament Jim Flaherty apologized in the provincial legislature on behalf of the Ontario government to the Grandview Survivors Support Group for the abuses suffered. This has spurred others to come forward with similar complaints of mistreatment at the province's 11 other training schools. The women who ended up in Galt made many formal complaints to staff and family members while being at the school and the complaints of severe sexual abuse were ignored and never investigated.

The institution's buildings were demolished in 2000.

== See also ==
- List of correctional facilities in Ontario
- Brookside Youth Centre
- Project Turnaround
- Bluewater Youth Centre
- Nova Scotia Youth Centre
