= Ottawa-Carleton Detention Centre =

Prison in Ontario, Canada

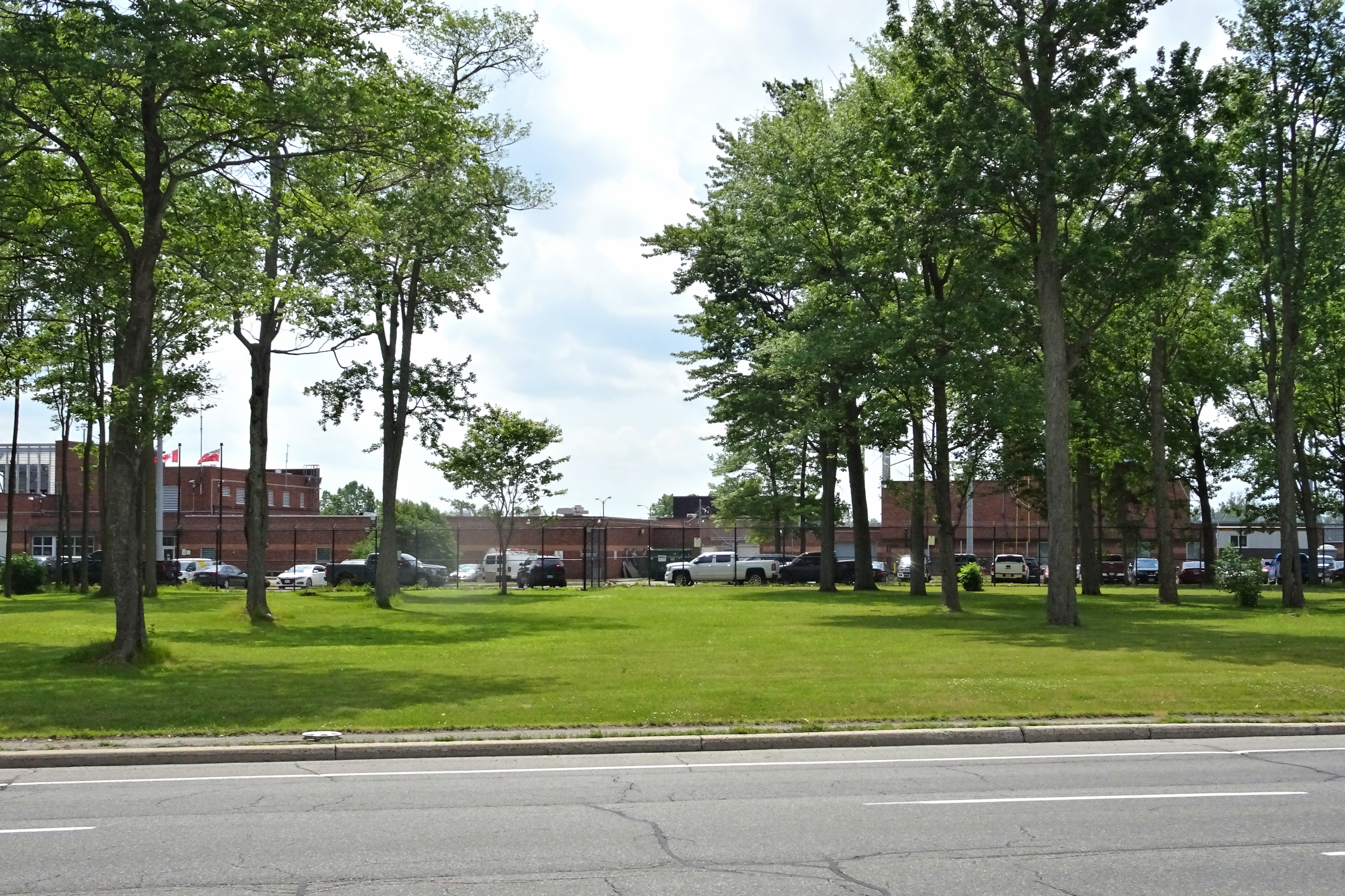
- Interactive map of Ottawa-Carleton Detention Centre
- Location: 2244 Innes Road Ottawa, Ontario, Canada K1B 4C4; 45.42466°N 75.57970°W
- Status: Operational
- Capacity: 575
- Opened: 1972
- Managed by: Ministry of Community Safety and Correctional Services

The Ottawa-Carleton Detention Centre (OCDC) is a correctional facility in Ottawa, Ontario, Canada that opened in 1972.

== Conditions ==
The jail (referred to locally as "Innes") was condemned for not meeting United Nations standards for treatment of prisoners. In 2004, a defence lawyer likened it to an "Iraqi prison camp". Some inmates are triple-bunked because of lack of space and overcrowding at the facility. In 2016 it was revealed that showers were used as segregation cells. The Ottawa Citizen revealed this fact and the Minister responsible, Yasir Naqvi, stopped the practice.

Inmates were put into solitary confinement 555 times between April and September 2015. Critics called these numbers "shocking". Due to overcrowding, the jail resorted to double bunking (the practice was banned in 2016), converting showers into cells and placing three inmates at a time who were supposed to be "segregated" in the same cell. Inmates in the 30-man dormitory are often denied the mandatory 20 minutes a day of yard time for over 2 weeks.

In January 2016, correctional officers were within 24 hours of going on strike. The concerns raised by union members were increased lockdowns, a lack of personal and professional visits and a complete lockdown with no yard.

A six-day hunger strike by prisoners occurred in December 2015. Prisoners were upset about having to eat meals in their cells due to lack of staffing at the prison.

In March 2016, a special task force was formed to address issues as reported by inmates, staff, and their respective families and quickly identified 42 issues requiring significant improvement. Their first progress report was released late October 2016. The report showed 11 of 42 improvement recommendations having been complete. The prison fulfilled 11 of these as of October 2016. They included a review of mental health training for staff and also guaranteed that inmates would be provided basic hygiene supplies. Additionally, the task force oversaw the introduction of a prisoner transportation coordinator, a daily bed usage reduction to 87%, and the elimination of bunking in showers as well as double/triple-bunking of cells, greatly contributing to relieving the general overcrowding issues.

To date, the third and final task force progress report had reported that 21 of 42 recommended improvements had been completed, with realistic and measurable short-term goals set to complete the remaining 21.

== Notable incidents ==
- In March 2016 an inmate collapsed and died of a heart attack after complaining that he felt unwell.

== See also ==
- List of correctional facilities in Ontario
