= King Street Gaol (1798) =

First jail in Toronto, Canada

Coordinates: 43.6493°N 79.3764°W

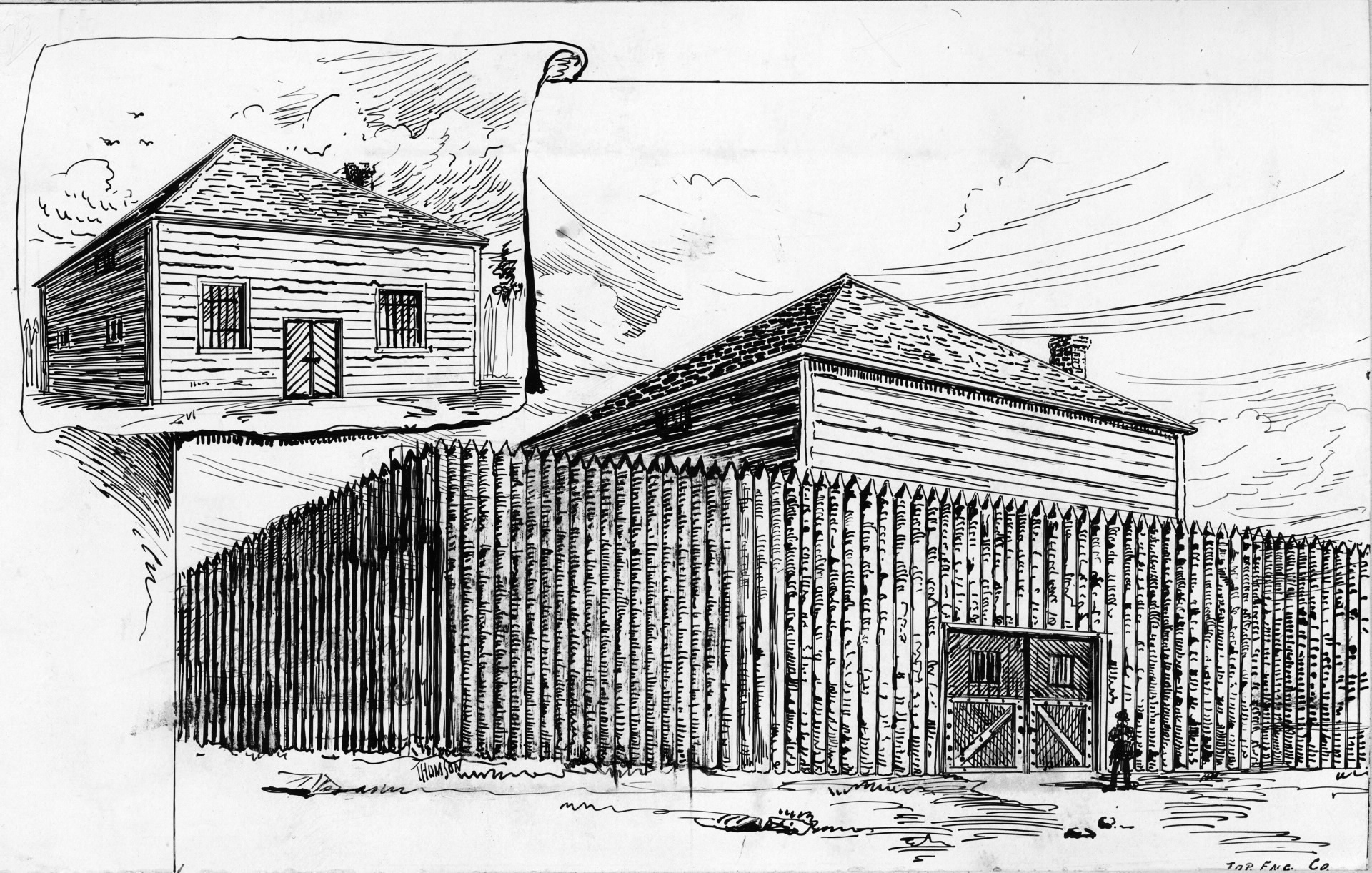
King Street Gaol

The King Street Gaol (commonly known as the Old Log Gaol) was Toronto's first jail, built in 1798 on the outskirts of York, Upper Canada. A log structure with 10 cells and a hanging yard, it was located on the south-east corner of King Street and Yonge Street, where the King Edward Hotel stands today. The jail quickly fell into disrepair, leading it to be abandoned. The east cells of the jail were completely rotten, the ceilings in the different rooms were insufficient, and the sheriff didn't feel safe when having to confine prisoners in cells or debtor's rooms. It was replaced by a brick jail (further east between King Street and Court Street) in 1824.

The building was built by Hugh Carfrae, a former soldier in the Queen's Rangers, the regiment formerly commanded by John Graves Simcoe, who was then the Governor of Upper Canada.

The first person to be executed at the jail was John Sullivan on October 11, 1798. A tailor by trade, Sullivan was convicted of stealing a forged note worth about one dollar.

== See also ==
- List of correctional facilities in Ontario
