= Sprucedale Youth Centre =

Prison and school in Ontario, Canada

- Interactive map of Sprucedale Youth Centre
- Location: Simcoe, Ontario, Canada; 42.834421°N 80.280125°W
- Status: Operational
- Opened: 1966
- Former name: Sprucedale Training School
- Managed by: Ministry of Children, Community and Social Services

Sprucedale Youth Centre (formerly known as Sprucedale Training School) is a youth detention centre in Simcoe, Ontario, Canada operated by the province's Ministry of Children, Community and Social Services. The centre houses high-security male young offenders between 13 and 18 years of age, primarily those convicted of serious offences under the Youth Criminal Justice Act up to and including murder.

== Secondary school ==
Sprucedale Secondary School

Location
- 660 Ireland Road; Simcoe, Ontario, N3Y 4L8; Canada

Information
- School board: Brant Haldimand Norfolk Catholic District School Board
- Grades: 9-12
- Language: English

Until the 1990s, the centre's on-site school was not part any public school board. The province of Ontario ran the high school as an independent unit within the Ministry of Community Safety and Correctional Services; however, an administrative change was made throughout the province and the obligation to run the school was placed in the hands of the Grand Erie District School Board that operated in the facility's region. The teachers that worked in the prison became employees of the board upon this shift.

The school is designed to provide credits toward an Ontario Secondary School Diploma and allow young persons in custody to complete their high school or upgrade functional literacy and work related skills. There are no school teams or extracurricular activities. The teachers are not expected to be involved in correctional activities, rather they are dedicated to providing education like in any other high school environment and are often unaware of the prisoner's case history or criminal background. In 2002 when the prison staff went on strike, the school closed dispersing GEDSB teachers to other schools in the board for the length of the labour unrest.

In 2018, educational duties for the Sprucedale Youth Centre were transferred to the Brant Haldimand Norfolk Catholic District School Board.

== See also ==
- List of provincial correctional facilities in Ontario
- List of youth detention incidents in Canada
