= List of provincial correctional facilities in Ontario =

This is a listing of past and present correctional facilities run by the provincial government in Ontario, Canada. Provincial correctional facilities for adults are operated by the province's Ministry of the Solicitor General. Youth facilities have at various times been under the same jurisdiction, but currently fall under the Ministry of Children, Community and Social Services.

== Types of facilities ==
Adult correctional facilities in Ontario are divided into four categories: correctional centres, jails, detention centres, and treatment centres. Some facilities are more than one type. Correctional centres house sentenced offenders who are serving a period of incarceration of up to two years, more then a day. (Note: Offenders serving sentences of two years or longer are incarcerated in facilities operated by the federal Correctional Service of Canada.) Provincial jails (historically spelled gaols) and detention centres house persons awaiting trial, offenders serving short sentences, or offenders awaiting transfer to other facilities. Jails are smaller and older facilities originally established by local governments while detention centres are larger, regional facilities. Treatment centres are specialized facilities treating offenders for sexual misconduct, substance abuse, anger management, and other issues.

Youth correctional facilities in Ontario are also called "secure custody facilities" and hold young people who are between 12 and 17 years of age. Youths are held in secure custody facilities if they are sentenced to secure custody after being found guilty of a crime or if a youth is ordered to be held in custody before or during a trial. As of 2020, the Ministry of Children, Community and Social Services directly operates six secure custody facilities.

== Operational correctional facilities ==
=== Adult ===
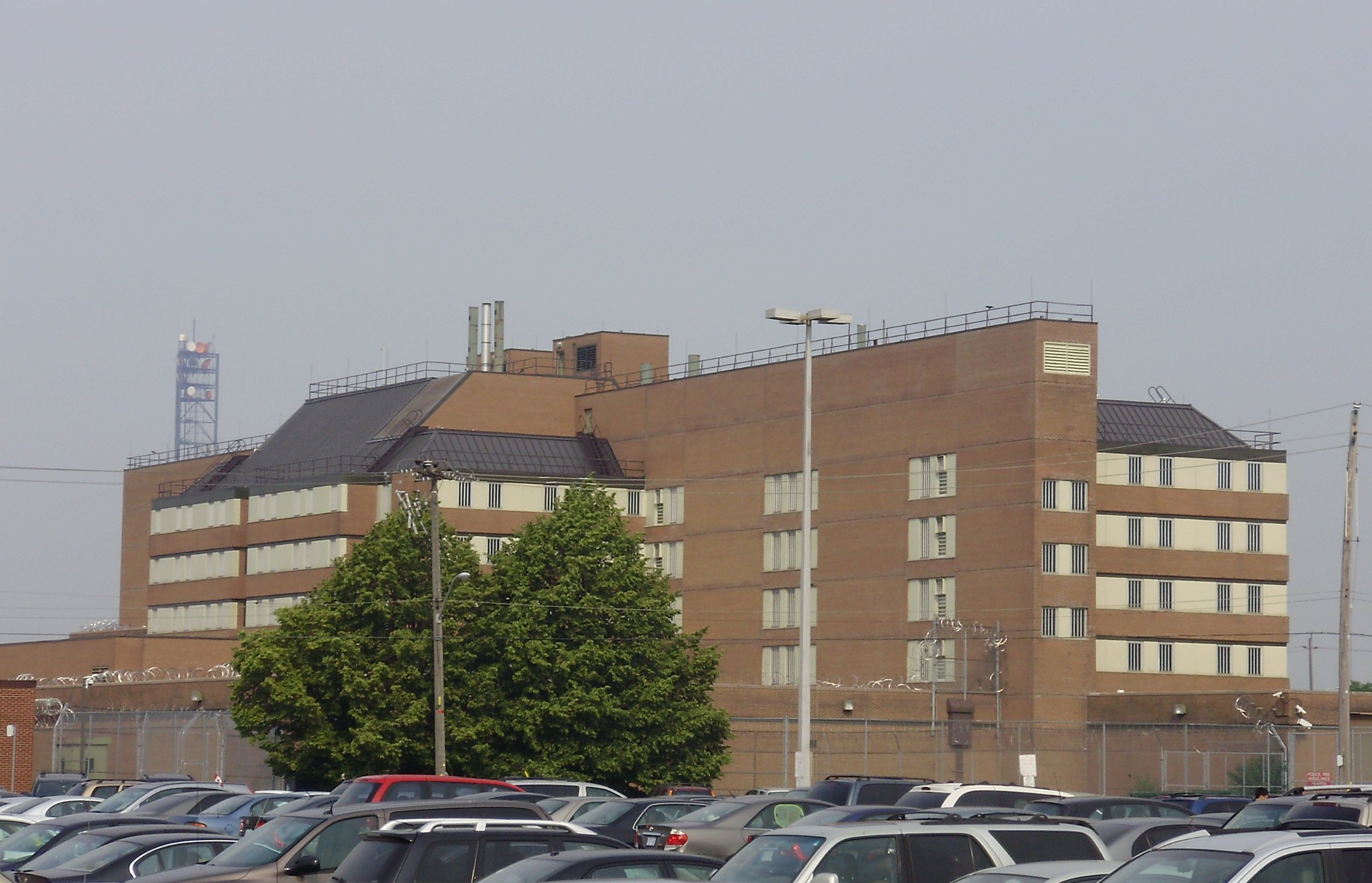
The Toronto East Detention Centre in Scarborough.

Name	Location	Opened
Algoma Treatment and Remand Centre	Sault Ste. Marie	1990
Brockville Jail	Brockville	1842
Central East Correctional Centre	Lindsay	2002
Central North Correctional Centre	Penetanguishene	2001
Elgin-Middlesex Detention Centre	London	1977
Fort Frances Jail	Fort Frances	1908
Hamilton-Wentworth Detention Centre	Hamilton	1978
Kenora Jail	Kenora	1929
Maplehurst Correctional Complex	Milton	1975
Monteith Correctional Complex	Iroquois Falls	1938
Niagara Detention Centre	Thorold	1973
North Bay Jail	North Bay	1930
Ontario Correctional Institute	Brampton	1973
Ottawa-Carleton Detention Centre	Ottawa	1972
Quinte Detention Centre	Greater Napanee	1971
St. Lawrence Valley Correctional & Treatment Centre	Brockville	2003
Sarnia Jail	Sarnia	1961
South West Detention Centre	Maidstone	2013
Stratford Jail	Stratford	1901
Sudbury Jail	Sudbury	1928
Thunder Bay Correctional Centre	Thunder Bay	1965
Thunder Bay Jail	Thunder Bay	1928
Toronto East Detention Centre	Toronto	1977
Toronto South Detention Centre	Toronto	2014
Vanier Centre for Women	Milton	2003
Waypoint Centre for Mental Health Care	Penetanguishene	1904

=== Youth ===
Name	Location	Opened
Cecil Facer Youth Centre	Sudbury	1971
Donald Doucet Youth Centre	Sault Ste. Marie	2008
Justice Ronald Lester Youth Centre	Thunder Bay	2009
Roy McMurtry Youth Centre	Brampton	2009
Syl Apps Youth Centre	Oakville	1973
Sprucedale Youth Centre	Simcoe	1966

== Past jails and correctional facilities ==
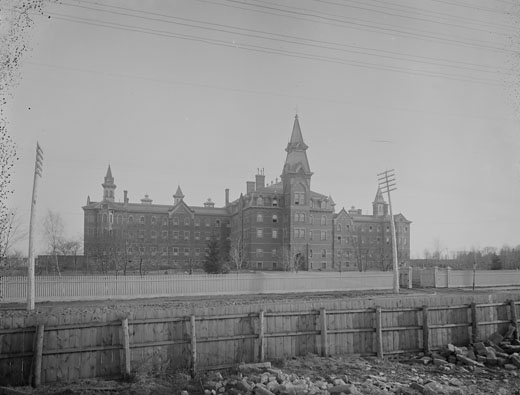
The Andrew Mercer Reformatory for Women in 1895

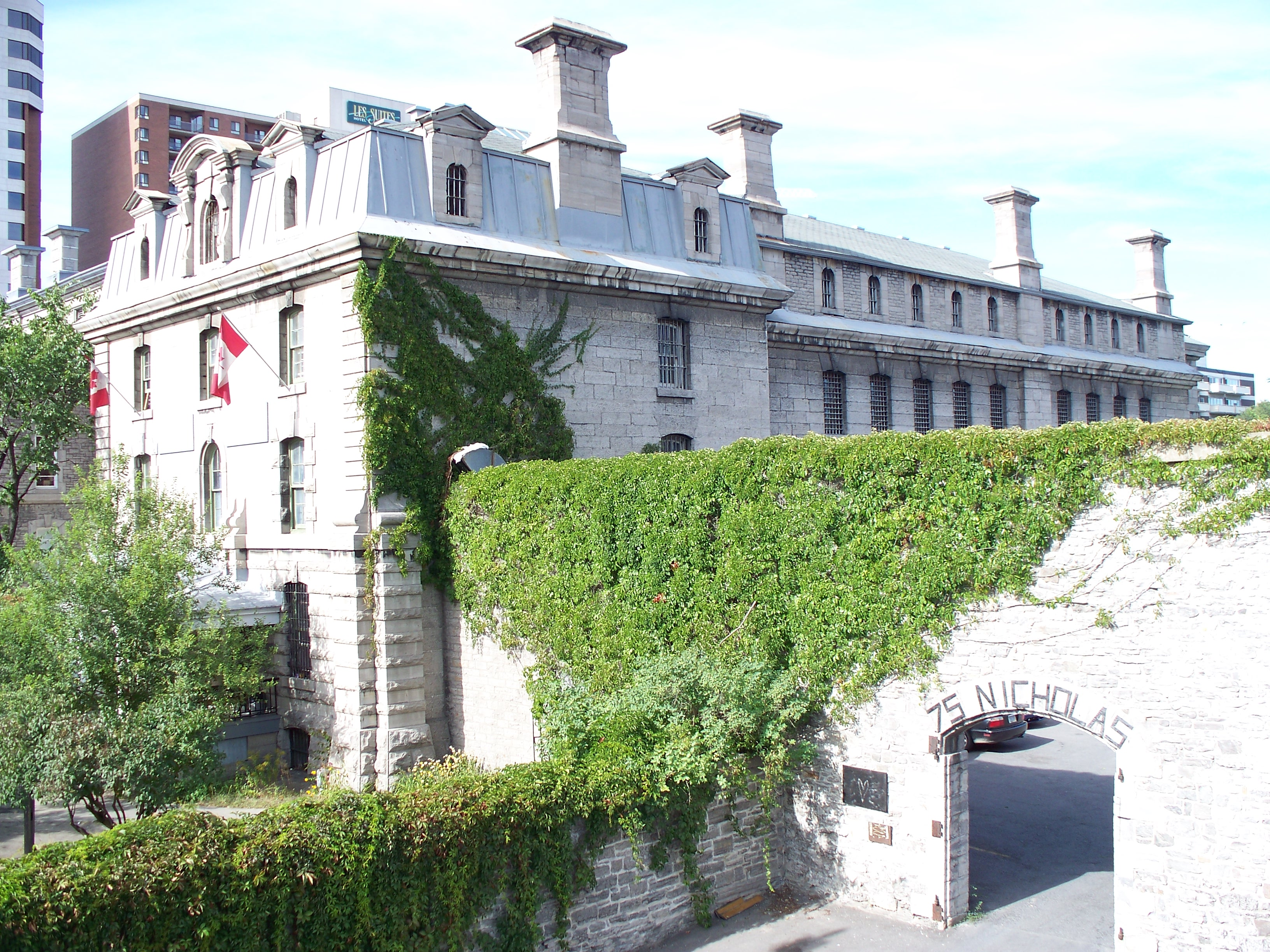
The Nicholas Street Gaol, 2007

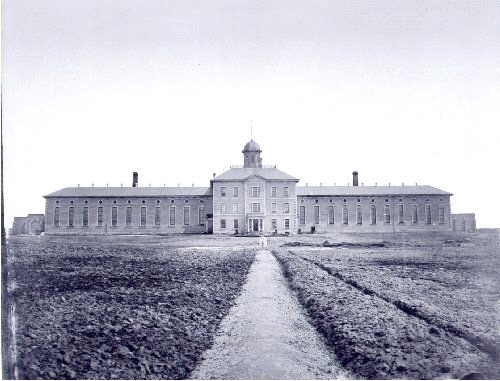
The Toronto Central Prison for men circa 1873

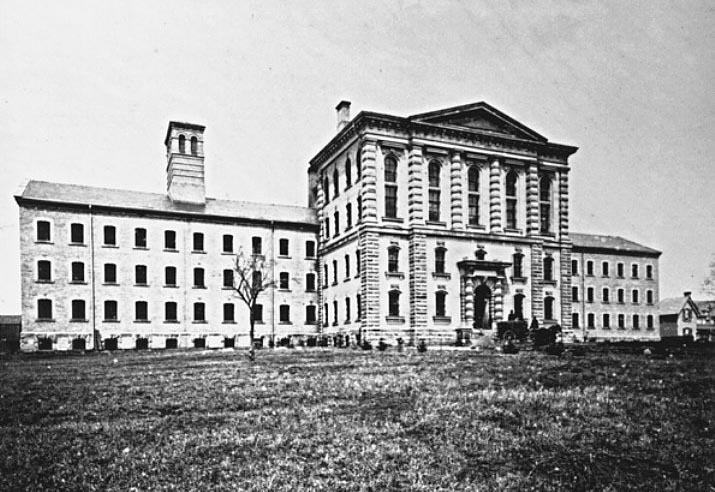
The Toronto "Don" Jail circa 1860s.

Facility	Opened	Closed
Andrew Mercer Reformatory for Women	1872	1969
Barrie Jail	1842	2001
Belleville Jail	1838	1971
Bluewater Youth Centre	1985	2002
Brookside Youth Centre	1948	2021
Bracebridge Jail	1882	1946
Brampton Adult Training Centre	1947	1979
Brampton Jail	1867	1977
Brantford Jail	1852	2017
Burtch Correctional Centre	1949	2003
Burwash Industrial Farm	1914	1974
Carleton County Jail (see Nicholas Street Gaol)		
Cayuga Jail	1851	1973
Chatham Jail	1850	2014
Cobourg Jail	1834	1998
Concord Industrial Farm for Women (see Toronto Municipal Farm for Women (Concord))		
Cornwall Jail	1833	2002
Durham Camp (see Millbrook Correctional Centre)		
Goderich Jail (see Huron County Gaol)		
Grandview Training School for Girls	1933	1976
Guelph Correctional Centre	1910	2003
Guelph Jail	1840	1980
Haileybury Jail	1935	1998
Halton County Jail	1863	1978
Hamilton Jail	1832	1978
Home District Jail (Toronto)	1838	1887
Huron County Gaol	1842	1972
Invictus Youth Centre		
King Street Gaol	1798	1827(?)
King Street Gaol	1824	
Kingston Jail	1835	2014
Kitchener Jail	1853	1978
L'Orignal Jail	1825	1998
Lindsay Jail	1863	2003
Millbrook Correctional Centre	1957	2003
Milton Jail	1878	1978
Mimico Correctional Centre	1887	2011
Napanee Jail	1865	1971
Niagara Falls Gaol		
Nicholas Street Gaol	1862	1972
Norfolk County Gaol	1848	1978
Ontario County Jail (Whitby)	1853	1960
Ontario Reformatory—Brampton (see Brampton Adult Training Centre)		
Ontario Reformatory—Guelph (see Guelph Correctional Centre)		
Ontario Reformatory—Millbrook (see Millbrook Correctional Centre)		
Ontario Reformatory—Mimico (see Mimico Correctional Centre)		
Orangeville Jail		
Ottawa Jail	1862	1972
Owen Sound Jail	1854	2011
Parry Sound Jail	1878	2001
Peel County Jail (see Brampton Jail)		
Pembroke Jail	1867	2004
Peterborough Jail	1842	2001
Picton Jail	1834	1971
Port Dalhousie Jail	1845	
Project Turnaround (operated by Encourage Youth Corporation)	1997	2004
Renfrew County Gaol	1866	2004
Rideau Correctional and Treatment Centre (Burritts Rapids)	1947	2004
Sault Ste. Marie District Jail	1928	2003
St. Catharines Jail	1868	1973
Simcoe Jail	1867	1978
Toronto Central Prison	1873	1915
Toronto (Don) Jail	1864	2014
Toronto Municipal Farm for Women (Concord)	1912	1939
Toronto West Detention Centre	1978	2014
Toronto Youth Assessment Centre (see also Mimico Correctional Centre Chronology)		
Trafalgar Jail		
Victoria Industrial School for Boys (see also Mimico Correctional Centre Chronology)		
Walkerton Jail	1866	2011
Waterloo Detention Centre	1978	2001
Wellington Detention Centre	1980	2001
Whitby Jail	1958	2003
Windsor Jail		2014
Woodstock Jail	1853	1977

== See also ==
- List of prisons in Canada
- Provincial correctional services in Canada
