= Ministry of the Solicitor General =

Canadian provincial ministry responsible for policing

- Ministère du Solliciteur général (French)
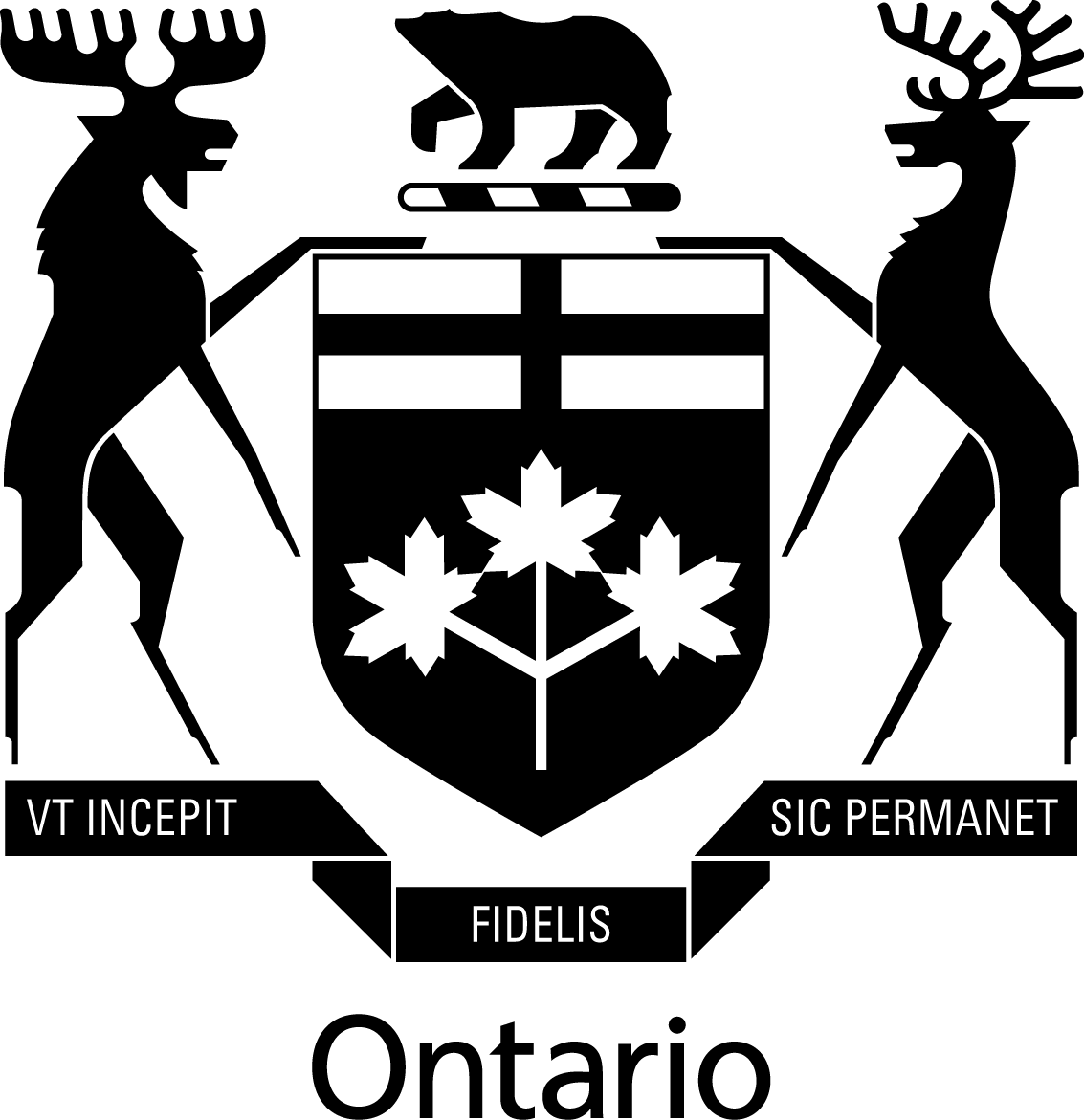
- Arms of the Government of Ontario

Ministry overview
- Formed: 1972
- Jurisdiction: Government of Ontario
- Headquarters: 18th Floor, 25 Grosvenor Street, Toronto, Ontario
- Minister responsible: Michael Kerzner, Solicitor General; Christine Hogarth, Parliamentary Assistant to the Solicitor General (Community Safety)
- Website: ontario.ca/page/ministry-solicitor-general/

The Ministry of the Solicitor General (French: Ministère du Solliciteur général; formerly known as the Ministry of Community Safety and Correctional Services) is the ministry in the Government of Ontario responsible for public security, law enforcement and policing, emergency management, correctional and detention centres/jails and organizations such as the Ontario Provincial Police, Emergency Management Ontario, and the Office of the Fire Marshal.

The minister responsible is Michael Kerzner, Solicitor General of Ontario.

== History ==
=== Law enforcement and public safety ===
Prior to 1972, the Attorney General and the Department of Justice had carriage of the responsibility for policing and public safety in the province.

The Ministry of the Solicitor General was established in 1972. Although there was no solicitor general of Ontario prior to 1972, one did exist for both the Province of Upper Canada (1791–1840) and the Province of Canada (1841–1867). With the re-organization of the Government of Ontario in 1972, however, this long-dormant office was re-established.

=== Correctional services ===
The Board of Inspectors of Asylums and Prisons, first appointed in 1859, was charged with general superintendence of the United Provinces' (i.e. Canada East/Quebec and Canada West/Ontario) 61 public institutions. These included 52 common gaols, the largest single type of institution, 4 lunatic asylums, 2 hospitals, 2 reformatory prisons, and one large penitentiary. Five inspectors were appointed and each one assigned an inspection district.

After Confederation, the Prisons and Asylums Inspection Act was passed on March 4, 1868. It vested control of all the above types of institutions located in Ontario, 49 in total, in the Office of the Inspector of Prisons and Asylums in the Department of the Provincial Secretary. On June 20, 1868, J.W. Langmuir was appointed first incumbent of the office.

In 1876, this office was renamed the Office of the Inspector of Prisons and Public Charities, and it became part of the Treasury Department. It was reverted to the Department of the Provincial Secretary in 1883. In addition to prisons, the office was also responsible for the superintendence of various public institutions that served social service functions, such as orphanages, houses of refuge, asylums for the insane, and hospitals. By 1925, the Inspector and his staff were responsible for superintending 380 institutions. Between 1927 and 1934, the provincial government gradually reduced the inspectorial functions and reassigned them to more specialized departments. For example, administration of charitable institutions was transferred to the newly created Department of Public Welfare in September 1930, and the responsibility for hospitals and sanatoria was transferred to the Department of Health in October 1930.

In 1934, the former Inspection Branch of the Provincial Secretary's Department became the Reformatory and Prisons Branch, the only Branch from the former inspectorate to remain in the Provincial Secretary's Department.

In 1946, the branch was elevated to department status, becoming the Department of Reform Institutions in the cabinet of Premier George Drew. The first minister was George Dunbar, whose first act was to create six work farms around the province. In the following decade, the development of its administrative structure reflected the evolution from punitive custody to correctional services. In 1954, a director of rehabilitation, chief parole and rehabilitation officer, and a chief psychologist were added, followed by a director of neurology and psychiatry in 1955. Other offices and services created within the department included the director of social work and the chaplaincy services.

On July 1, 1968, the department was renamed the Department of Correctional Services. The first minister was Allan Grossman, who said the change was made to update the service to reflect changes in attitudes to penal institutions. Prison guards were issued new uniforms that removed aspects of militarism from their appearance.

With the April 1972 reorganization of the Ontario government, the Department of Correctional Services was renamed the Ministry of Correctional Services. It took over the responsibility for probation services in 1972 from the Ministry of the Attorney General. In 1977, the Children's Services Division was transferred to the Ministry of Community and Social Services. In 1984, with the passage of the federal Young Offenders Act, the ministry assumed responsibility for detention and parole of young offenders aged 16 and 17.

=== Merger of the two functions ===
The Ministry of the Solicitor General and Correctional Services was formed on February 3, 1993, from the merger of the Ministry of the Solicitor General with the Ministry of Correctional Services. The two functions were separated again between 1999 and 2002.

In April 2002, the two functions merged again, and the newly created ministry was renamed as the Ministry of Public Safety and Security. This was done in the aftermath of the 2001 terrorist attacks. The new ministry encompassed correctional services as well as a new emphasis on border security. In 2003, the ministry was renamed to the Ministry of Community Safety and Correctional Services. In April 2019, the solicitor general role was re-introduced, and the ministry's name was reverted to the Ministry of the Solicitor General.

=== Security guard and private investigator licensing ===
In 2010, the ministry began to administer tests for new applicants and existing security guard or private investigator cardholders. Prior to 2010, any individual (as long as they were free, or pardoned, of a criminal charge) could obtain one or both licences just by paying 80 dollars for each. The new requirements came after a coroner's inquest into the death of Patrick Shand, who died from asphyxiation while in the custody of an untrained private security guard and staff at a Loblaws store in Scarborough. Despite the store chain's policy of prohibiting use of force against shoplifters, Shand was restrained and handcuffed. Shand remained handcuffed when staff had to perform CPR after the former went into respiratory arrest. The handcuffs were not removed until Shand was placed in an ambulance 18 minutes after the 911 call was made.

In response to the inquest's recommendations, applicants for security guard or private investigator licences must pass a 40-hour training course before writing a test. 62.5% is a passing grade for security guards and 77% for private investigators.

== List of solicitors-general ==
The position of Solicitor-General dates back to the foundation of Upper Canada, and also Canada West in the Province of Ontario, the predecessors to the current province of Ontario.

=== Upper Canada ===
- Robert Isaac Dey Gray 1795–1804
- G. D'Arcy Boulton 1804–1814
- Sir John Beverley Robinson 1815–1818
- Henry John Boulton 1818–1829
- Christopher Alexander Hagerman 1829–1837
- William Henry Draper 1837–1839

=== Canada West in the Province of Canada ===
The office was formally Solicitor for Upper Canada, even though the area was referred to as Canada West after the unification of Upper and Lower Canadas in 1840.

Minister	Term of office		Political party (Ministry) (Note: Only the Joint-premiers from Canada West named below)	Note
Robert Baldwin	February 10, 1841	June 14, 1841	Governor Sydenham	
Henry Sherwood	July 23, 1842	September 16, 1842	Governor Bagot	
James Edward Small	September 26, 1842	December 11, 1843	Reform (Baldwin)	
Henry Sherwood	October 7, 1844	June 30, 1846	Tory (Draper)	
John Hillyard Cameron	July 1, 1846	March 10, 1848	Tory (Draper)	
John Hillyard Cameron	July 1, 1846	March 10, 1848	Tory (Sherwood)	
William Hume Blake	April 22, 1848	September 30, 1849	Reform (Baldwin)	(Note: Bwetween 1848 and 1858, the solicitor generals were not members of the Executive Council)
John Sandfield Macdonald	December 14, 1849	November 11, 1851	Reform (Baldwin)	(Note: Bwetween 1848 and 1858, the solicitor generals were not members of the Executive Council)
John Ross	November 12, 1851	June 21, 1853	Reform (Hincks)	(Note: Bwetween 1848 and 1858, the solicitor generals were not members of the Executive Council)
Joseph Curran Morrison	June 22, 1853	September 10, 1854	Reform (Hincks)	(Note: Bwetween 1848 and 1858, the solicitor generals were not members of the Executive Council)
Henry Smith	September 11, 1854	February 24, 1858	Coalition (Note: Coalition of Conservatives in Canada West with both Parti Bleu and moderate Reformers in Canada East) (MacNab)	(Note: Bwetween 1848 and 1858, the solicitor generals were not members of the Executive Council)
Henry Smith	September 11, 1854	February 24, 1858	Liberal-Conservative (J.A. Macdonald)	(Note: Bwetween 1848 and 1858, the solicitor generals were not members of the Executive Council)
George Skeffington Connor	August 2, 1858	August 6, 1858	Reform (Clear Grits) (Brown)	(Note: Bwetween 1848 and 1858, the solicitor generals were not members of the Executive Council)
Joseph Curran Morrison	February 22, 1860	March 17, 1862	Liberal-Conservative (J.A. Macdonald)	
James Patton	March 27, 1862	May 23, 1862	Liberal-Conservative (J.A. Macdonald)	
Adam Wilson	May 24, 1862	May 10, 1863	Reform/Liberal (J.S. Macdonald)	
Lewis Wallbridge	May 16, 1863	August 12, 1863	Reform/Liberal (J.S. Macdonald)	
Albert Norton Richards	December 26, 1863	January 30, 1863	Reform/Liberal (J.S. Macdonald)	
James Cockburn	March 30, 1864	June 30, 1867	Liberal-Conservative (J.A. Macdonald)	
James Cockburn	March 30, 1864	June 30, 1867	Great Coalition (Note: Coalition of Liberal-Conservatives and Clear Crits in Canada West with both Parti Bleu in Canada East) (J.A. Macdonald)	

=== Ontario ===
Minister	Term of office		Minister	Term of office		Political party (Ministry)	Note
prison/correctional services portfolio			law enforcement/policing portfolio			Political party (Ministry)	Note
Ministers of Reform Institutions			(Public safety/policing was part of the portfolio of the Attorney General and the Department of Justice prior to 1972.)			PC (Drew)	
George Dunbar	15 April 1946	19 October 1948	(Public safety/policing was part of the portfolio of the Attorney General and the Department of Justice prior to 1972.)			PC (Drew)	
George Dunbar	19 October 1948	4 May 1949	(Public safety/policing was part of the portfolio of the Attorney General and the Department of Justice prior to 1972.)			PC (Kennedy)	
George Dunbar	4 May 1949	15 July 1949	(Public safety/policing was part of the portfolio of the Attorney General and the Department of Justice prior to 1972.)			PC (Frost)	
William Hamilton	15 July 1949	16 November 1950	(Public safety/policing was part of the portfolio of the Attorney General and the Department of Justice prior to 1972.)			PC (Frost)	
John Foote	16 November 1950	18 July 1957	(Public safety/policing was part of the portfolio of the Attorney General and the Department of Justice prior to 1972.)			PC (Frost)	
Matthew Dymond	18 July 1957	28 April 1958	(Public safety/policing was part of the portfolio of the Attorney General and the Department of Justice prior to 1972.)			PC (Frost)	
Ray Connell	28 April 1958	22 December 1958	(Public safety/policing was part of the portfolio of the Attorney General and the Department of Justice prior to 1972.)			PC (Frost)	
George Wardrope	22 December 1958	8 November 1961	(Public safety/policing was part of the portfolio of the Attorney General and the Department of Justice prior to 1972.)			PC (Frost)	
Irwin Haskett	8 November 1961	14 August 1963	(Public safety/policing was part of the portfolio of the Attorney General and the Department of Justice prior to 1972.)			PC (Robarts)	
Allan Grossman	14 August 1963	1 July 1968	(Public safety/policing was part of the portfolio of the Attorney General and the Department of Justice prior to 1972.)			PC (Robarts)	
Minister of Correctional Services			Solicitor General			PC (Robarts)	
Allan Grossman	1 July 1968	1 March 1971				PC (Robarts)	
Syl Apps	1 March 1971	26 February 1974				PC (Davis)	
Syl Apps	1 March 1971	26 February 1974	John Yaremko	7 April 1972	26 February 1974	PC (Davis)	
Richard Potter	26 February 1974	7 October 1975	George Albert Kerr	26 February 1974	21 February 1975	PC (Davis)	(Note: Kerr resigned following allegations of bribery by a defendant in a criminal prosecution. Kerr was never criminally charged in the matter. Kerr returned to cabinet following the conclusion of the criminal trial upon which the trial judge made a specific finding that the allegation against Kerr was not supported by any evidence.)
Richard Potter	26 February 1974	7 October 1975	John Clement (interim)	21 February 1975	July 9, 1975	PC (Davis)	
Richard Potter	26 February 1974	7 October 1975	George Albert Kerr	July 9, 1975	October 7, 1975	PC (Davis)	
John Smith	7 October 1975	3 February 1977	John Palmer MacBeth	7 October 1975	21 January 1978	PC (Davis)	(Note: MacBeth concurrently served as Provincial Secretary for Justice (October 7, 1975 – January 21, 1978) while being Solicitor General.)
Arthur Meen	3 February 1977	23 June 1977	John Palmer MacBeth	7 October 1975	21 January 1978	PC (Davis)	(Note: MacBeth concurrently served as Provincial Secretary for Justice (October 7, 1975 – January 21, 1978) while being Solicitor General.)
John MacBeth (interim)	23 June 1977	21 September 1977	John Palmer MacBeth	7 October 1975	21 January 1978	PC (Davis)	(Note: MacBeth concurrently served as Provincial Secretary for Justice (October 7, 1975 – January 21, 1978) while being Solicitor General.)
Frank Drea	21 September 1977	18 October 1978	John Palmer MacBeth	7 October 1975	21 January 1978	PC (Davis)	(Note: MacBeth concurrently served as Provincial Secretary for Justice (October 7, 1975 – January 21, 1978) while being Solicitor General.)
Frank Drea	21 September 1977	18 October 1978	George Albert Kerr	21 January 1978	11 September 1978	PC (Davis)	(Note: Kerr concurrently served as Provincial Secretary for Justice.)
Frank Drea	21 September 1977	18 October 1978	Roy McMurtry	11 June 1978	13 February 1982	PC (Davis)	(Note: McMurtry concurrently served as Attorney General)
Gordon Walker	18 October 1978	10 April 1981	Roy McMurtry	11 June 1978	13 February 1982	PC (Davis)	(Note: Walker concurrently served as Provincial Secretary for Justice (August 30, 1979 – February 13, 1982))
Nick Leluk	10 April 1981	8 February 1985	Roy McMurtry	11 June 1978	13 February 1982	PC (Davis)	
Nick Leluk	10 April 1981	8 February 1985	George William Taylor	13 February 1982	8 February 1985	PC (Davis)	
Nick Leluk	8 February 1985	1 May 1985	John Reesor Williams	8 February 1985	17 May 1985	PC (Miller)	
Don Cousens	17 May 1985	26 June 1985	Bud Gregory	17 May 1985	26 June 1985	PC (Miller)	
Solicitor General and Minister of Correctional Services						Liberal (Peterson)	
Ken Keyes				26 June 1985	3 December 1986	Liberal (Peterson)	(Note: Keyes stepped down as Solicitor General during investigation of an instance of him sharing an alcoholic drink with police officers on a police boat.)
Minister of Correctional Services			Solicitor General			Liberal (Peterson)	
Ken Keyes	3 December 1986	9 January 1987	Ian Scott (interim)	3 February 1986	9 January 1987	Liberal (Peterson)	
Solicitor General and Minister of Correctional Services						Liberal (Peterson)	
Ken Keyes				9 January 1987	29 September 1987	Liberal (Peterson)	
Minister of Correctional Services			Solicitor General			Liberal (Peterson)	
David Ramsay	29 September 1987	2 August 1989	Joan Smith	29 September 1987	6 June 1989	Liberal (Peterson)	(Note: Smith resigned due to allegation of improper contact to the police while Solicitor General.)
David Ramsay	29 September 1987	2 August 1989	Ian Scott (interim)	6 June 1989	2 August 1989	Liberal (Peterson)	
Richard Patten	2 August 1989	1 October 1990	Steven Offer	2 August 1989	1 October 1990	Liberal (Peterson)	
Solicitor General and Minister of Correctional Services						NDP (Rae)	
Mike Farnan				1 October 1990	31 July 1991	NDP (Rae)	
Allan Pilkey				31 July 1991	23 September 1992	NDP (Rae)	
Minister of Correctional Services			Solicitor General			NDP (Rae)	
David Christopherson	23 September 1992	3 February 1993	Allan Pilkey	23 September 1992	3 February 1993	NDP (Rae)	
Solicitor General and Minister of Correctional Services						NDP (Rae)	
David Christopherson				3 February 1993	26 June 1995	NDP (Rae)	
Bob Runciman				26 June 1995	27 April 1998	PC (Harris)	(Note: Runciman resigned for ministerial responsibility after a young offender's name was inappropriately revealed in the Speech from the Throne.)
Jim Flaherty (interim)				27 April 1998	27 July 1998	PC (Harris)	
Bob Runciman				27 July 1998	17 June 1999	PC (Harris)	
Minister of Correctional Services			Solicitor General			PC (Harris)	
Rob Sampson	17 June 1999	4 December 2000	David Tsubouchi	17 June 1999	8 February 2001	PC (Harris)	(Note: Sampson resigned for ministerial responsibility after a government backbencher improperly revealed names of several young offenders in the legislature.)
Norm Sterling (interim)	5 December 2000	8 March 2001	David Tsubouchi	17 June 1999	8 February 2001	PC (Harris)	
Rob Sampson	8 March 2001	14 April 2002	David Turnbull	8 February 2001	14 April 2002	PC (Harris)	
Minister of Public Safety and Security						PC (Eves)	
Bob Runciman				15 April 2002	22 October 2003	PC (Eves)	
Minister of Community Safety and Correctional Services						Liberal (McGuinty)	
Monte Kwinter				23 October 2003	30 October 2007	Liberal (McGuinty)	
Rick Bartolucci				30 October 2007	18 August 2010	Liberal (McGuinty)	
Jim Bradley				18 August 2010	20 October 2011	Liberal (McGuinty)	
Madeleine Meilleur				20 October 2011	11 February 2013	Liberal (McGuinty)	
Madeleine Meilleur				11 February 2013	25 March 2014	Liberal (Wynne)	
Yasir Naqvi				25 March 2014	13 June 2016	Liberal (Wynne)	
David Orazietti				13 June 2016	16 December 2016	Liberal (Wynne)	
Kevin Flynn (acting)				16 December 2016	12 January 2017	Liberal (Wynne)	
Marie-France Lalonde				12 January 2017	29 June 2018	Liberal (Wynne)	
Michael Tibollo				29 June 2018	5 November 2018	PC (Ford)	
Sylvia Jones				5 November 2018	4 April 2019	PC (Ford)	
Solicitor General						PC (Ford)	
Sylvia Jones				4 April 2019	24 June 2022	PC (Ford)	
Michael Kerzner				24 June 2022	Present	PC (Ford)	

== See also ==
- List of provincial correctional facilities in Ontario
