= Bedson =

Bedson may refer to:

- Derek Bedson (1920–1989), Canadian civil servant.
- Samuel Bedson (1886–1969), British microbiologist.
- Samuel Lawrence Bedson (1842–1891), British-born military man active in Canada.
- Bedson Ridge, a ridge in the Rocky Mountains located in Alberta, Canada.
- Jack Bedson (born 1950), is an Australian writer.
