= Marilyn Lerch =

Canadian poet and teacher

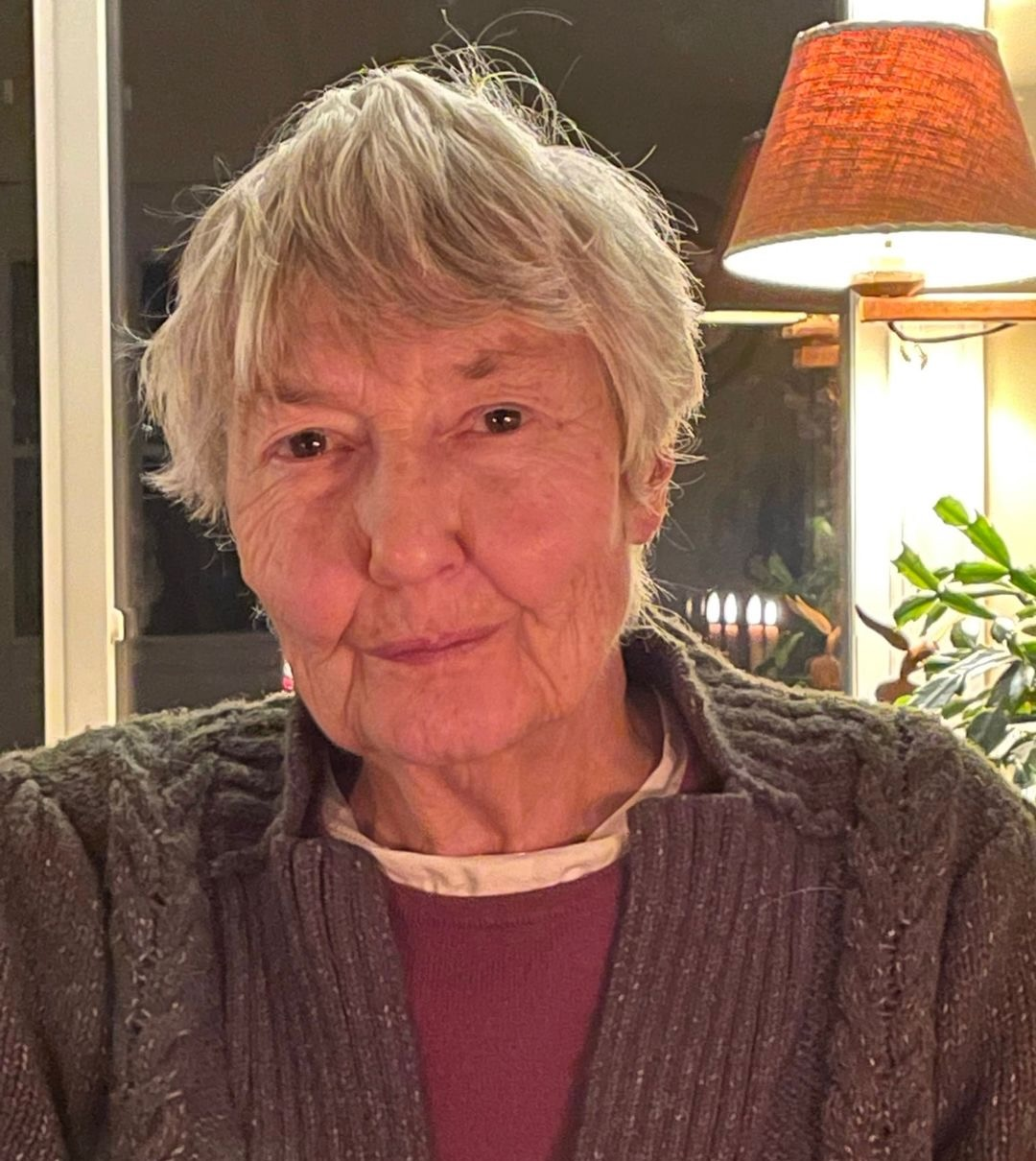
- Marilyn Lerch in 2021
- Born: May 26, 1936 (age 90); East Chicago, Indiana
- Citizenship: Canada; United States
- Education: Indiana University
- Occupations: Poet, teacher, journalist, activist
- Spouse: Janet Hammock
- Writing career
- Genre: Poetry
- Notable works: That We Have Lived At All: poems of love, witness & gratitude Moon Loves Its Light Witness and Resist The Physics of Allowable Sway

Marilyn Lerch (born May 26, 1936) is a Canadian poet, teacher, journalist and activist. She is the author of five collections of poetry that explore the rough edges of love and betrayal, healing and hurt. Her poems combine keen observations of nature's beauty with sharp, and sometimes despairing, commentary on its destruction. In the words of one reviewer, her poetry "often unites the green universe of the garden with the red-and-black world of politics and war." Her work also probes, sometimes with mordant humour, the accelerating effects of technologies propelling humanity toward planetary catastrophe. "I began to have an image of myself as a poet who was standing in a very indefinite, immense space, and I'm pointing at things that I think we need to pay attention to," Lerch told an interviewer in 2014 after publishing her fourth book of poetry.

In 2022, Lerch published Disharmonies, a poetic conversation with Geordie Miller in which the two poets condemn capitalism as a system organized around plunder and profit and instead imagine a world that is dedicated to satisfying human needs.

From 2006 to 2010, Lerch served as the President of the Writers' Federation of New Brunswick and from 2014 to 2018, as poet laureate for the Town of Sackville, New Brunswick where she lives.

Several of Lerch's poems have been set to music. She collaborated with Canadian composer Lloyd Burritt on the song cycles "We Move Homeward" and "Moon Loves Its Light," first performed in 2011 at Songfire, a music festival sponsored by the Vancouver International Song Institute. Burritt also set her poetry to music in his works "Triptych Three Songs on Three Abstract Paintings" and "Quintessence." Canadian soprano Allison Angelo recorded four Burritt/Lerch songs in her 2015 debut album Moon Loves Its Light. Nicholas Piper's choral composition "The Trees on the Edge," commissioned by the Ottawa Bach Choir, took Lerch's poem "New Orleans Obliquely" as its text. Alasdair MacLean used Lerch's poem "We Move Homeward" in his choral and orchestral composition of the same name, first performed in Halifax, Nova Scotia on March 7, 2000.

== Career ==
Marilyn Lerch was born in East Chicago, Indiana, which she has described as "a little industrial town snug up against the Illinois border." After graduating from Indiana University, she taught high school English in Gary, Indiana before moving to Washington, D.C. in 1967 where she continued her teaching career while also working with activist groups opposed to the U.S. war in Vietnam. Lerch dropped out of teaching for almost two years to work full time organizing demonstrations against the war.

In 1992, she earned a master's degree in holistic education from the Institute of Transpersonal Psychology. Her thesis was based on a year she spent teaching English to about a dozen, mainly African-American, Grade 11 students in a poverty-stricken and violence-prone neighbourhood in Washington, D.C. Lerch developed an integrative learning model designed, in part, to lead her students to become aware of the forces and relationships shaping their lives; develop trust in themselves; regain the joy of learning and learn to express kindness toward themselves and others. A key part of the method involved a Council or talking circle adapted from Indigenous American custom in which students would speak as they held a talking stick that was passed clockwise around the circle. At the end of the school year, Lerch judged the integrative model an overall success based on student academic performance in reading, writing and communications skills; student evaluations of the class; her own assessment and administrators' interviews with students.

After retiring from teaching, Lerch moved, in 1996, to Sackville, New Brunswick, a small town she had visited during summer vacations. She began writing poetry and became active in movements for peace and social justice. She also campaigned against the extraction of shale gas and supported measures to mitigate the effects of climate change.

Lerch has also been an active member of PFLAG Canada, an organization that supports the rights of members of the LGBTQ community.

In addition to her activism, she taught creative writing at Westmorland, Springhill, and Dorchester prisons as well as the Nova Institution for Women in Truro, Nova Scotia. She served as President of the New Brunswick Writers' Federation (2006-2010) and as poet laureate for the town of Sackville (2014-2018). As poet laureate, Lerch wrote poetry for commemorative events, organized readings by local poets, sponsored literary contests and in her own words, inspired "young and old to love what only poetry can do."

Lerch also formed the Sackville Writers' Group and Roving Poets. In 2007, she took part in a national campaign funded by the Canada Council for the Arts called "Random Acts of Poetry" in which she dropped by classrooms, offices, the local hospital and theatre to recite from her work.

== Poetry ==
Marilyn Lerch has published five collections of poetry (2001-2018).

=== Lambs & Llamas, Ewes & Me ===
Lambs & Llamas, Ewes & Me is a cycle of poems published in 2001 by the Springbank Press with illustrations by Maskull Lasserre. It was printed in a limited edition of 110 copies using a foot-treadled, Chandler & Price letterpress. The book was designed and printed by Jamie Syer on French-made specialty paper and bound with wool from the sheep on Syer's farm in Bergen, Alberta.

In her introduction, Lerch writes that she had always been touched by the activity of shepherding even though she grew up in a town with steel mills, chemical plants and oil refineries. Yet, she felt there was something magical about watching over sheep on the Syer farm in the summer of 1998 "accompanied, however reluctantly, by an unforgettable llama named Tarragon."

"Caring about creatures innocent and absolutely helpless was a way, perhaps, of caring for something undefended in myself," she explains.

Every afternoon, retreating from a steamy Alberta sun,
Number 109 and her two lambs come to visit and read
my poems. They nudge them off the bale to get a closer
look, crinkling and smudging the lines. I think:
it is good that poems taste of mud and hot breath.

=== Moon Loves Its Light ===
Moon Loves Its Light is a collection of 67 poems published in 2004 by Morgaine House Publishing of Pointe Claire, Quebec. Its four sections feature a wide range of poems including ones of arrival and departure such as "We Move

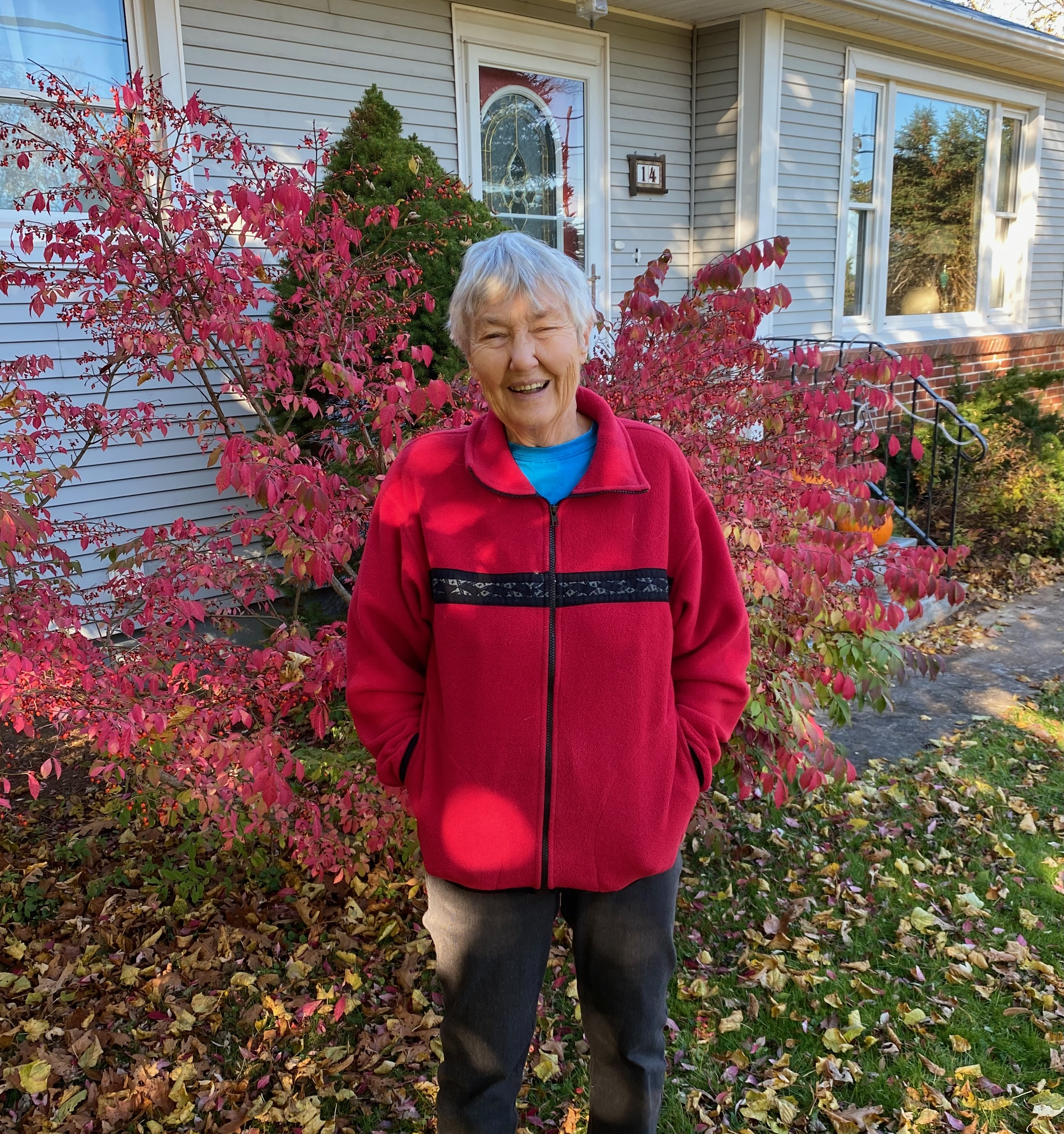
Marilyn Lerch at her home in Sackville, N.B. in 2021

" and "The Cave Painters of Lascaux: Creating As They Came." "Ceremony For A Friend" describes emptying an urn "tilting into the fast-running current/a stream of ashes like a banner unfurled/ rippling toward the pulling-away sea...beige scarf on dark moving water." "Tantramar Manifesto" warns fellow poets that they are deceived by the flatness of New Brunswick's Tantramar Marshes dyked to hold back the Bay of Fundy's high tides. Instead, the poem calls for breaking through the "obsolete defenses" to "let in the flood" and urges poets to abandon their complacency and restraint: "Let us / slide down the low-tide banks of Tantramar / and risk the sucking red mud, / riot in language, lingua flexa,/ kick-ass syntax, improvisatory, / shake the ground with our eyes."

The book also contains poems about the coup d'état in Chile on September 11, 1973, the 2001 September 11 attacks in the U.S. and the 2002 bombings in Bali, Indonesia. Another recalls the events of August 6, 1945.

A six-page poem called "A Disappearing Act" satirizes the effects of on-screen, online culture with its discontinuity, pornography and commodification where disappearing users become "SURF-ACES," "SKIMMY DIPPERS," "E-COMMERCE SHOP LIFERS" and "AUTO-MATES. An autobiographical poem called "Father Take 1" celebrates "Happy times/by the large avuncular Philco/listening to the Hit Parade, sugared/cinnamon toast and hot tea commingling" when the poet visited her father in "my childhood's second home/not his place, his sister's" and the "Lovely times" as he sometimes walked her home "when the dense, unhurried fall of snow/muffled East Chicago's grind and grime":

when I'd tuck my hand in his, close tight
my eyes, squealing as he led me into snowbanks
Don't stop, Daddy,
walk through our door and stay forever.

But in "Father Take 2," the poem records that he carried off the bag of coins she kept under her pillow when she was five: "He was gone and they were gone" and his denial of what he had done "leaving me a gate unhinged/swinging, swinging back and forth/between his theft and mine."

Writing in Atlantic Books Today, Michael deBeyer notes that Lerch's first poem, "We Move Homeward" expresses the theme of the poet's moving toward, but also away from home. He points to lines in the second poem, "Tantramar Manifesto" that show how to do it: "We live on a curve to somewhere/and must risk dropping out of sight/to follow it." "Lerch takes the risk," DeBeyer writes. "She follows the curve, to Niagara and Toronto, El Salvador and New Zealand. Her journeys are eye-opening, political, and reveal a keen sense of justice." But, he adds, she also returns to her many homes throughout the book. "Each return, each poem, is wrought with resolve and compassion. Behind Lerch, the moon provides its cold light of observation, its romantic light of inspiration."

In his review of Moon Loves Its Light, George Elliot Clarke urged readers to "get this book. Read this poet." Clarke wrote that the book revealed Lerch to be a poet "awake to everything: her locale, her family, her personal experience, all that impinges upon her consciousness. The result is a wide-ranging, expansive, endlessly surprising work."

=== Witness and Resist ===
Witness and Resist, published in 2008 by Morgaine House of Pointe Clair, Quebec, includes poems that call attention to suffering and injustice. "Elegy for Joseph Terry Riordon" describes the suffering of a Canadian military policeman exposed to toxic chemicals and depleted uranium during the 1991 Persian Gulf War. (A note explains that his widow declined a military funeral after the government refused to recognize that he suffered from Gulf War Syndrome.) The poem "Maria Luz Continues" is about a Washington bus tour guide who tells passengers that the Pentagon is the world's largest office building with 24,000 employees, then reveals that the she herself and her son, were beaten and violated during the 1973 military coup in Santiago, Chile "while somewhere in this iniquitous hive, glasses were raised."

The book explores how poetry can "speak for the silenced, / call things by their name, / refuse hate and despair," but it also has a warning:

I'm no better than
a humanist voyeur
fondling
the wound,
pointing,
with dirt
under my fingernails,
for until I abjure
sympathy as redemption,
until I witness
and
resist,
don't take me
or any poet like me
seriously.

Witness and Resist also contains poems about Lerch's emotional reactions to gardens and landscapes, her depiction of a vivid sunset and one about the morning light that is dedicated to her spouse Janet. In "Father, Whose Witness I Must Be," she continues to probe her fraught relations with the man who was: "Just Dad / whom I adored, avoided, pitied, / felt ashamed or contemptuous of, sad for, / and whose unused powers frighten / and fuel me to this day."

Lerch pays tribute to Paul Celan and Walt Whitman and engages in an imaginary dialogue with Adrienne Rich's "Usonian Journals 2000".

Writing in the Spring 2009 issue of the Montreal Review of Books, Bert Almon singled out some of Lerch's poems for special praise:

Her nature poems are excellent: a fine opening poem about a sunflower celebrates its solitary being in brilliant details and ends with a risky image of bees crawling across its oiled eye. Another short poem, “Homeless,” is an unforgettable depiction of the fate of the drones barred from the beehive; it is left to the reader to draw the piercing parallel with the lives of homeless humans. This is an anthology-grade poem.

Almon notes, however, that Lerch has been "a political activist for left-wing causes since the 1960s" and he writes that some of her work in Witness and Resist is more rhetoric than poetry: "When she excoriates her native country, the United States, for redneck attitudes or developing the bomb, some readers may give intellectual assent while feeling that the poems smack of editorials."

For his part, George Elliot Clarke notes that Lerch has a keen eye for politics in all things.

Trained as a teacher and journalist, Lerch is observant of diurnal reality and of the ‘news’ that impinges on it. So, she speaks of how 'A poem may… / couple sunflower seeds encoded / to be wide yellow eyes / with bunker busters / descended from a brandished club.' The fact of flowers—about the house—does not negate ‘the flowers of evil’ that can spring up like razor wire anywhere.

Clarke writes that, for Lerch, politics is "heart-felt" and "heartbreaking" and that she understands it is sometimes not because of quarrels with others, but with oneself: "In “Child of Mine,” Lerch takes this truth to heart, providing a psychological autobiography that locates the temptation to favour liquor over love, or solitude over self-sharing, in unresolved childhood pain...Her poetry holds nothing back; it is all about revelation: that which hurts—and that which heals."

=== The Physics of Allowable Sway ===
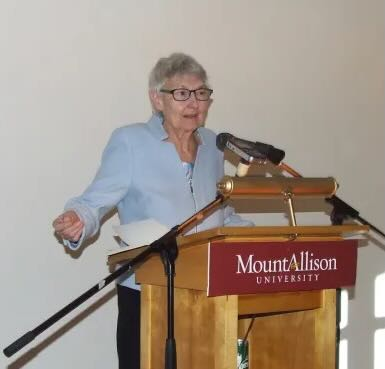
Marilyn Lerch at a book launch in 2019

The Physics of Allowable Sway is self-published by Devon Avenue Poetry Books, printed and bound in 2013 by Gaspereau Press. Marilyn Lerch's fourth poetry collection takes its title from "Once I Dreamed," a poem that opens with its narrator dreaming about, "a slow, determined climb to bedrooms where, / one by one, I slew the family, / then from the bottom of the darkened stairs, turned and saw / processing down, in single file, / all the dead to be slain again."

The narrator explains that telling the story allowed her to escape from the "abattoir" grasping "a clutch of poems." This poem ends with an image and an idea:

See how the tree tops, like keening women, bend and lift,
the physics of allowable sway,
Ours wider and deeper than we know.

The Physics of Allowable Sway includes descriptions of landscapes and scenes that reveal the beauty and mystery of sea and sky, forest and beach, but, as the poem "Once I Dreamed" suggests, there are undercurrents of anxiety and violence. Lerch prefaces a poem called "Paul" with a note that begins: "A young man I never knew committed suicide." She explains that Paul came to life for her through his writings and later, through a book of his journal entries and a biography published by his father. "Paul haunted me, became my muse at a crucial turning point in my life." The poem, which notes that the poet lived in a house that Paul's "hands helped build", is partly a meditation on suicide and the motives for it: Is it a "decisive" act "fixed and pure" or a last goodbye from "a pent-up soul" and a life "broken in too many pieces"?

Behind all words, behind seeming causes and explanations,
each soul's inexplicable journey,
framed by one question,
between renewal and death
how does one decide?

The book contains poems that explore the careers and ambiguous legends of jazz horn player Bix Beiderbecke ("man oh man, / if you heard the horn / that's all there is") and the writer J.D. Salinger. In the poem, "Barachois Bay Revisted", Lerch pays tribute to poets Mary Oliver and Theodore Roethke:

I carry Mary Oliver's "House of Light"
and all of Roethke,
one for pure delight,
one for its longing,
and make my own lines
out of looking at sea's edge on Barachois Bay

A long concluding poem entitled "Leaving the Human Behind" contemplates the evolution of technologies from the prehistoric, red-ochre paintings at Pech Merle where the human and animal began pulling away to our own world of sweeping change:

Sinking to its knees, the great bison
locked eyes with our ancestors
and slow-gathering over time
an epiphany
we are you and we are not you

One day (any day now)
will programmed things
fitted with human-friendly sensibilities
tend to newborns, answer doorbells,
conduct wars and finance, pull sheets
over the dead
and will we see in those eyes
we are you and we are not you?

Our ancestors made the grand slow leap
into
the human,
when was it,
that turn
out of?

In their online review of The Physics of Allowable Sway, New Brunswick poet Kathy Mac and former St. Thomas University student Ben Lord write that Lerch aspires to create an artifact for her readers as compelling as the red-ochre cave paintings are to her. "Like the images on the wall at Pech Merle, The Physics of Allowable Sway is a palm-print not just of Lerch’s life, but of the cultures, experiences and histories which culminate in this book."

In his review, George Elliot Clarke writes that Lerch's book looks beyond the present to "ponder the fate of humanity and our planet...its quality arises from the poet's simple commitment to speaking her truth, in her voice, without worrying about moralists, politicos, meddlers and preachers." He concludes that "Lerch is a consummate poet" who "must not be disregarded."

=== That We Have Lived At All ===
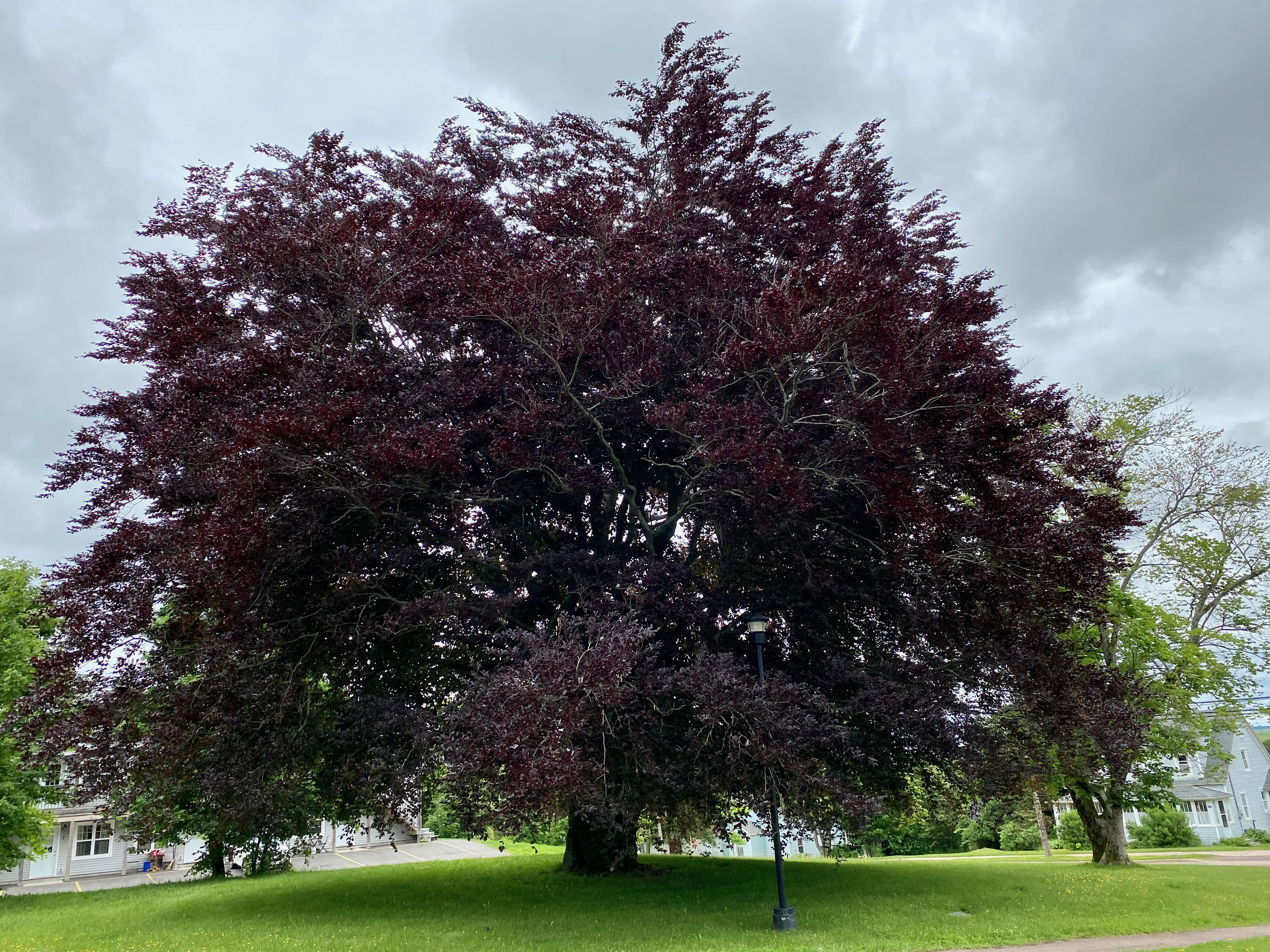
The old copper beech that Lerch celebrates in "Choose One Tree and Love It."

That We Have Lived At All: poems of love, witness & gratitude, published in 2018 by Chapel Street Editions in Woodstock, New Brunswick, is divided into six parts.

Part I entitled Close to Home is devoted mainly to poems about places and things close to Sackville, New Brunswick where Lerch lives. The poem "Choose One Tree and Love It", for example, focuses on a 90-year-old copper beech, "its massive trunk / wrinkling like elephant hide and pocked / with sunburst fungi and black moss." Part I is also about local people such as the Reverend Jamie Gripton, "a hipster minister, / down to earth and far out" who wielded a machete once "in Tim Hortons / while reading a Jamaican poem" but "sheathed his zeal" after a warning from "a plainclothes cop / sipping a double-double." The poem, which is called "Fire and Ice", says that after his death from cancer, Gripton "moved into / a seriously whimsical eternity / where our minds end / and Jamie's God / begins."

Part II contains a dozen poems that begin with "I Want You to Know About This," describing the procession of images the poet sees when her eyes close, "without plot or theme / rhyme or reason". "Whenever / I close my eyes / it's never to darkness." Other poems in this section include "Rethinking Cremation" in which the poet considers that "a rough pine box is more appealing" or "the green peace option, / rotting in a gunny sack around the roots of a tree" or "what the hell / forget enclosures of any kind /...just leave my eyes open to the stars, / and I / will take care of the rest."

Part III consists of one long poem entitled "Recycling Samuel Beckett". It lists the horrors Beckett lived through "Easter uprising / London depression / Wars / the one to end all" and considers his method: "write the mess" in "strip-searched language / pared, gnawed away / to barely barest". Then, adapting Beckett's lines, the poem ends, "can't go on / somehow / will go on / don't kid ourselves / that's what we do."

Part IV called "In These Anthropocene Times" ponders the fate of the Earth in the 21st century when "the turning point is past, / the worst is yet to come." In "What Do You Have to Say for Yourself, Poet?" Lerch writes: "I say / we know we cannot go on like this / and we know it will go on like this." The poem identifies "a pitiless system" of rage and suffering: "Technique / in its own context, / eats its own tail, / squeezing culture to a pulp." It concludes by affirming the need for artistic resistance "sing play paint / write / dream / our truths" with "seeds of goodness/ seeds of courage / still being sown."

Part V begins with a prose prologue explaining that Lerch borrowed nine, life-sized, charcoal drawings of nudes created by Tom Henderson, an art professor at Mount Allison University, and spread them, one by one, on the floor of her small writing room:

I was taken in by these powerful, visceral evocations of the body's capacity to express joy, to bear pain and isolation. It's the body that's crucified when the mind is in opposition to power. It's the body that orgasms and bleeds and trembles...Sometimes the images exerted such power I had to turn away, take a walk. For several weeks I lived with them, I admired and envied the directness with which the nude figures spoke their conditions. I let myself feel what they might be feeling and I wanted to crush the essence of these emotions into poetry.

Half a dozen poems follow this prologue including "Wo(man) Standing Serene," "Man and Woman on a Bed" and "Drawn to Tenderness."

Part VI consists of a long poem called "Foremothers" and, in celebration and mourning, tells the stories of Lerch's great-grandmother, grandmother and mother. "All the mothers are gone now," the poem begins. "I leave poems, not children, / this one tracing and honouring / the maternal line."

At the official launch of her book in February 2019, Lerch suggested poets must write about contemporary issues. “Poets have to tell the tale of our time,” she said. “It’s not an exaggeration to say we are being hunted by powerful forces whose consequences are often deliberately kept secret or unknown; forces that have already violated the carrying capacity of our Earth; forces that have created unprecedented inequality giving power to the few over the many.”

=== Disharmonies ===
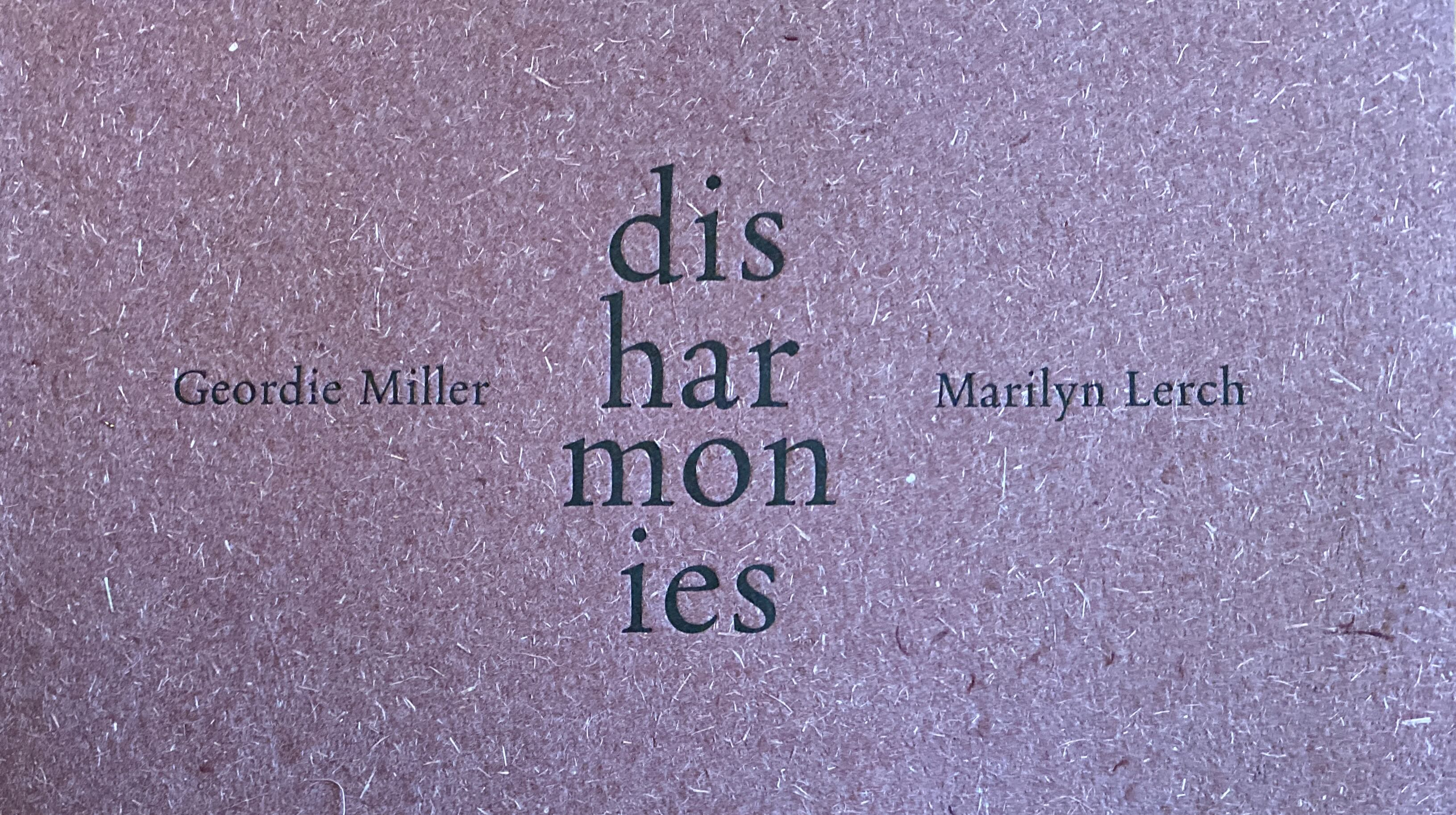

In 2022, Marilyn Lerch and Sackville poet and professor Geordie Miller published Disharmonies, a series of dialogues or calls and responses divided into 12 sections, that explore the poet's roles and responsibilities in a 21st century world of capitalist exploitation, natural collapse and the COVID-19 pandemic where, in Wendy Trevino's words, "poetry is not enough." The pages are divided, with Miller's prose and poetry printed on the left and Lerch's on the right.

In section four, for example, Miller asks: "Did I ever tell you about my introduction to Marx?" Then, goes on to write that a high school history textbook included a section on the Communist Manifesto. "It was immediately poetry to me," Miller says, but adds that he kept it to himself because he felt politics might be "poison to my art. lol. look at me now."

Lerch responds with a story about a 1971 protest in Washington, D.C. in which a comrade declared that one day everyone will be carrying a red flag. "Our mindset, a moment of belief," Lerch writes, but adds a second story from a Socialist Workers Party conference in 1973 where a comrade said he thought a violent revolution wasn't necessary. "Leon turned over in his grave," Lerch writes, "about 80 comrades fainted dead away, the rest kinda went crazy. For me it was axiomatic: capitalism created systematic and systemic violence against all who opposed it. Violence came from the ruling classes; violence would be returned from the oppressed and the proletariat. Class warfare. No way out. But having just turned eighty-five, I want to believe in massive non-violent civil disobedience, but I don't know, don't know."

In section nine, Lerch writes in response to Miller's comments about "alienation" and how "they could only keep killing us" that: "Star stuff lived within us / elements of our bones and bile and blood / harmless / before we began / being fed plastics / having asbestos stuffed around the cradle."

Both poets agree that even if "poetry is not enough," writing it is a way to fight for a better world. Lerch observes: "Agreed: Poetry is not enough / even if there were enough of it / but no change without it" and later she writes: "Poetry liberates us from abstraction."

== Literacy project ==
In 2007, while Marilyn Lerch was serving as President of the Writers Federation of New Brunswick, she was asked to help promote literacy in New Brunswick, a province with one of the lowest literacy rates in Canada. She recruited members of the Federation to interview 17 adult learners, from ages 19 to 71, and tell the stories of how they struggled to overcome their problems with reading, writing and basic math skills. The project resulted in the 2009 book Breaking the Word Barrier: Stories of Adults Learning to Read that Lerch co-edited with Angela Ranson.

Lerch said she hoped the book would overcome the stigma suffered by people with low literacy skills. "All who participated hope that it will encourage thousands of adults to seize opportunities readily available and will draw the public's attention to the serious literacy deficit in New Brunswick," she told a newspaper interviewer. The book lists several literacy programs and services in New Brunswick and across Canada.

== Bibliography ==
- 1961: Toontoony Pie, and other tales from Pakistan by Ashraf Siddiqui and Marilyn Lerch, illustrated by Jan Fairservis (The World Publishing Company)
- 2001: Lambs & Llamas, Ewes & Me by Marilyn Lerch with illustrations by Maskull Lasserre (Springbank Press)
- 2004: Moon Loves Its Light (Morgaine House) ISBN 0-9732787-1-4
- 2005: Making a Difference: A Celebration of the 3M Teaching Fellowship, edited by Marilyn Lerch (Council of 3M Teaching Fellows, Society for Teaching and Learning in Higher Education) ISBN 0-9738227-0-8
- 2008: Witness and Resist (Morgaine House) ISBN 0-9732787-6-5
- 2009: Breaking the Word Barrier: Stories of Adults Learning to Read, co-edited with Angela Ranson (Goose Lane) ISBN 0-86492-547-6
- 2013: The Physics of Allowable Sway (Devon Avenue Poetry Books) ISBN 978-0-9919152-0-0
- 2018: That We Have Lived At All: poems of love, witness & gratitude (Chapel Street Editions) ISBN 978-1-988299-19-8
- 2022: Disharmonies, co-written with Geordie Miller (The Hardscrabble Press) ISBN 978-1-9990537-7-2
