= Warkworth Institution =

Canadian correctional facility

Coordinates: 44.21264°N 77.80707°W

- Interactive map of Warkworth Institution
- Location: Brighton, Ontario
- Security class: Medium security
- Capacity: 670
- Opened: 1967
- Managed by: Correctional Service Canada

The Warkworth Institution is a medium-security prison facility located in the municipality of Brighton, Ontario. It sits at the Northernmost edge of Brighton, right on the border with Trent Hills, and East of the community of Warkworth (from which it gets its name). The prison is the largest federal correctional institution in Canada with a population of approximately 625 housed in five units.

== History ==
Construction of Warkworth Institution started on March 26, 1965, on 208 acres (0.84 km^{2}) of land that had been purchased by the Department of Justice. In 1967, the institution began operation entirely with staff and no inmate population. In September 1967, ten blocks were opened and the first six inmates arrived from Joyceville Institution. The official opening took place on October 14, 1967. At the end of the 1968 fiscal year, the facility housed 92 inmates. In 1971, the Living Unit concept was introduced.

The Warkworth prison, opened in 1967, lies just inside the Brighton border and is a major financial contributor to the municipality. The federal prison does not technically pay property taxes, but the government gives the amount in a grant to the municipality. The Warkworth Institution gives Brighton $602,000 each year, which is almost 16 per cent of the municipality's budget. The jail also gives Northumberland County a grant of $168,500.

A riot broke out at approximately 9:00pm on July 21, 2009, during which prisoners took control of the prison infirmary. Subsequently, one inmate died of a drug overdose in his cell. Inmates broke the concrete that acts as bars across the outside windows of the cells. By doing this inmates were able to get out of their cells. This can be seen when walking to the gym on 9 block (unit 1) there are different style concrete bars.

Warkworth is a sister institution to Springhill, NS; Cowansville, QC; and Drumheller, AB.
