= Stony Mountain Institution =

Prison in Manitoba, Canada

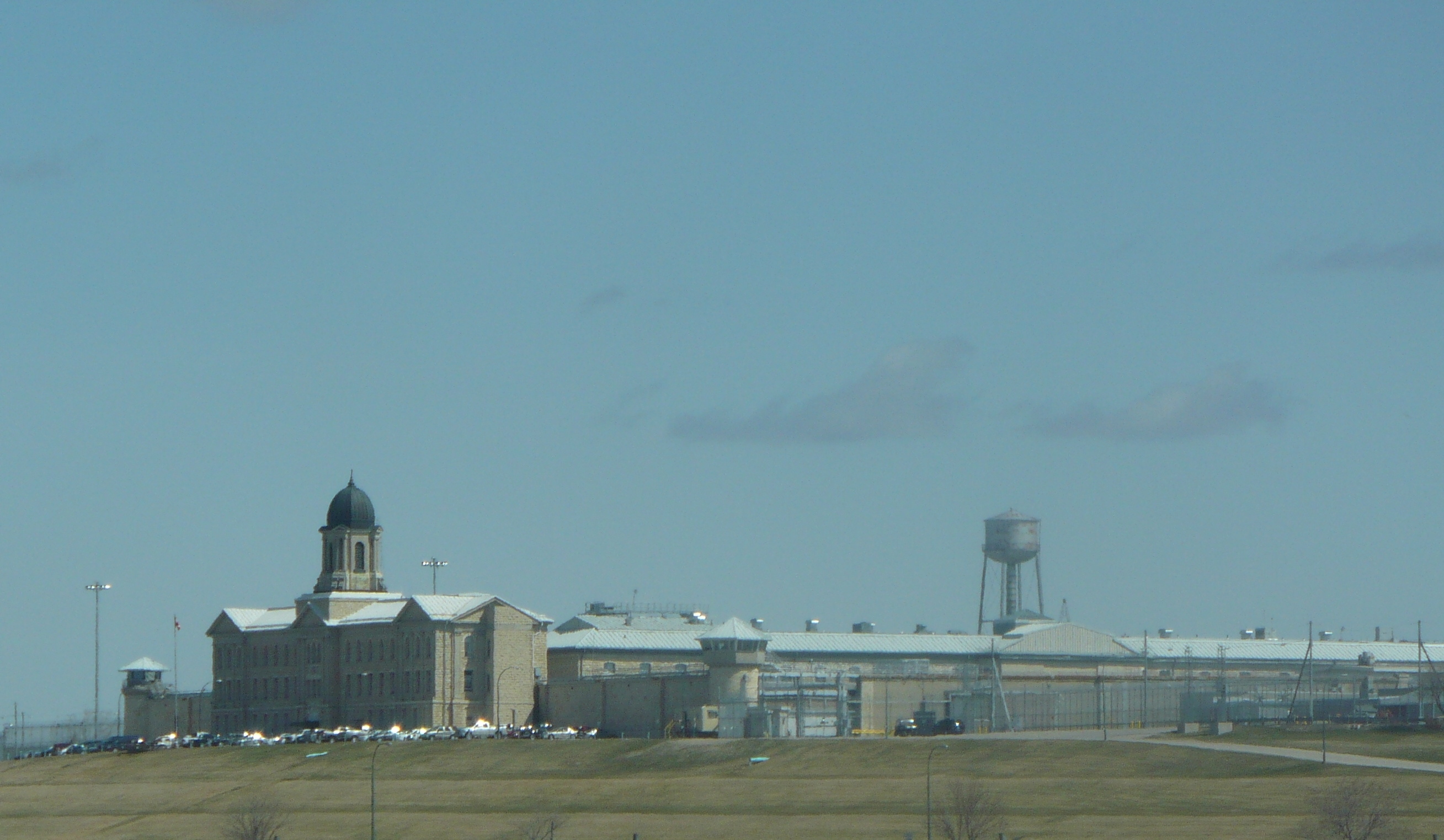
- Stony Mountain Institution, 2008
- Interactive map of Stony Mountain Institution
- Location: 50.082°N 97.225°W
- Security class: minimum, medium, & maximum
- Capacity: Adult males: Maximum security: 96; Medium security: 484; Minimum security: 217
- Opened: January 1877 (inmates moved); August 15, 1877; 149 years ago (grand opening)
- Former name: Manitoba Penitentiary
- Managed by: Correctional Service of Canada
- Warden: Chris Ritchie

Notable prisoners
- Chief Big Bear (also known as Mistahi-maskwa), Ken Leishman, Thomas Hogan, Thomas Sophonow, David Milgaard, James Driskell

Stony Mountain Institution is a federal multi-security complex including minimum security located in the Rural Municipality of Rockwood immediately adjacent to the community of Stony Mountain, Manitoba, about 24 km (15 mi) from Winnipeg.

The Institution (medium-security) began operations in 1877, making it the oldest running federal prison in Canada following the closure of Ontario's Kingston Penitentiary on 30 September 2013. Immediately adjacent to Stony Mountain Institution is the Rockwood Institution, a minimum-security facility established in 1962. The newest addition to Stony Mountain, the maximum-security unit, opened in 2014.

== History ==
=== Development ===
In the years immediately following Canada's Confederation in 1867, several new institutions were established in Canada, joining the existing Kingston Penitentiary (est. 1835): the establishment of the Manitoba Penitentiary (renamed Stony Mountain Institution in 1972) was commissioned by the nascent Government of Canada in 1872, followed by St Vincent de Paul in 1873, British Columbia Penitentiary in 1878, Dorchester Penitentiary in 1880, Alberta Penitentiary in Edmonton in 1906, and Saskatchewan Penitentiary in Prince Albert in 1911.

Lands were expropriated in 1872 at Stony Mountain, Manitoba, some 18 kilometres (11 mi) from Lower Fort Garry, where Sir Garnet Wolseley’s expeditionary force had been stationed as part of the effort to quell the first Red River Rebellion of 1869-70. One of the members of that force, Samuel Lawrence Bedson (1842–91), did not return east following the Rebellion, but went on to become the first Warden of the new Penitentiary.

The site's isolated location and lack of available building materials proved a challenge to the construction process. Stone for the windowsills and the corners was quarried at Lower Fort Garry, dressed and hauled overland during the winter. Timber was freighted from Ontario. A brick-making machine from St. Paul, Minnesota, was employed in the manufacture of over 400,000 bricks from local clay. Around 60 tradesmen worked during the summer months and 25 stonemasons during the winters.

=== Opening and early years ===
In January 1877, though the penitentiary was not yet completed, inmates began to be transferred from the gaol at Upper Fort Garry. Construction of the penitentiary was finished soon after in February. Despite efforts to avoid wastage due to difficulties in transporting materials, by the time the facility was completed, the final cost was $125,000—some $9000 over budget.

Samuel Lawrence Bedson became the first warden of the new penitentiary on 2 February 1877.

On 15 August 1877, with Lord Dufferin (the Governor General of Canada) and his wife Hariot Georgina presiding, the Manitoba Penitentiary was officially opened. 14 inmates, including a female "lunatic," comprised the original prison population transferred from Fort Garry.

The original prison building was soon joined by a number of other buildings, as a period of rapid growth commenced. Structures such as stables, schoolhouse, staff quarters, hospital, chapels, forge, and slaughterhouse were built. By 1885, some 44 cells were in use. Growth tended to be decentralized and the buildings came to occupy a large area. In 1885, over 35 people involved in the North-West Rebellion landed in the penitentiary.

The original heating system, based on an English model, proved inadequate and the winter of 1877/78 proved very harsh for both staff and inmates. This situation was alleviated by the installation of a steam boiler in the summer of 1878. Due to the severity of the Manitoba winter, heating costs were $3000—considerably more than the identical British Columbia Penitentiary. To cope with this continuing expense, Warden Bedson negotiated with the CPR for a favourable shipping rate for coal.

Bedson proved to be an innovative and progressive warden. A system was devised whereby prisoners could communicate their needs to guards without breaking the rule of silence. A four-foot white wand painted black on one end (for ordinary needs) and red on the other (for emergency use) was utilized. He also emerged as a noted prison reformer. He placed high value on religious and educational programs, and spiritual and educational needs were emphasized from the very beginning. Bedson also instituted an early system of inmate wages and parole.

He also played a key role as a conservationist. An original investment of 13 head of buffalo grew substantially over the years and after a number of transfers of ownership, the herd was eventually relocated to Wood Buffalo National Reserve in Alberta.

=== 20th century ===
Early growth was ambitious, if dispersed. By 1912, the construction of a perimeter wall had begun, and the numerous buildings were completely enclosed by 1922.

By 1913, the Manitoba Penitentiary held 200 inmates, most of whom were Canadian, though many came from other countries.

The entrance to the institution was via the "South Gate"—a handsome two-storey structure that controlled vehicular and pedestrian traffic. The need for additional cell space led to the construction of wings off the main cell-block throughout the 1920s. The building of a new facility to replace the original Administration building commenced in 1933. Due in part to the Depression and the Second World War, this building was left in a partially completed state for many years. The 1877 Administration Building and the South Gate, the last survivors of the original prison structures, were demolished in the late 1960s, and Stony Mountain's origins are not readily apparent in the modern facility of today.

The number of inmates began to decrease immediately after the First World War and the same during the Second World War. For the 1967 Pan American Games in Winnipeg, inmates created much of the equipment in 1965, including the mats, target frames, and the winner's podium for the swimming pool.

In 1982, four maximum-security inmates, armed with improvised knives, jumped four guards, bringing them into a cell block with more than 30 other prisoners. No casualties came as result, following 35 hours of negotiation.

=== 21st century ===
In the summer of 2006, four separate major seizures of contraband (illegal drugs) were made, including the single largest seizure in Stony Mountain Institution's history.

Stony Mountain Institution is a clustered site, housing maximum, medium and minimum security inmates. There are seven operational units within the clustered facility, offering various levels of supervision, including healing units for Indigenous inmates (named NI-MIIKANA at the medium security site and AANIIKEKANA at the minimum security site).

==== Expansion ====
In November 2010, the federal government announced that Stony Mountain would be undergoing an expansion, which added a maximum-security wing to the institution, with 96 new beds. The total cost of the building project was expected to be $45 million. In justifying this spending, federal Minister of Public Safety Vic Toews stated, "In the previous system, a violent criminal sentenced to nine years in prison could potentially be on our streets in as little as three years if he or she spent two years awaiting trial. This possibility is not acceptable to Canadians. We are acting to ensure that the criminals pay their debt – their full debt – to society."

This new wing became the only maximum-security unit in Manitoba. About 40 new positions were created with the addition of the maximum-security wing. The maximum unit at Stony Mountain Institution was completed and inmates were placed there in 2014.

== Notable inmates ==
- After the 1885 North-West Rebellion, Chiefs Big Bear, One Arrow, and Poundmaker were all wrongfully convicted of treason and were imprisoned in the Stony Mountain Penitentiary. Here their health deteriorated rapidly and upon being released due to poor health, died shortly thereafter.
- Kenneth Leishman (aka "The Flying Bandit") pled guilty in 1958 to two bank robberies, and was given a 12-year sentence to be served at Stony Mountain Penitentiary, near his family in Winnipeg. He was released on parole towards the end of 1961, after just 3.5 years, and was described by Stony's warden as a ‘model prisoner’.
- Thomas Sophonow was wrongfully convicted in 1981 of the murder of Barbara Stoppel; he was acquitted on appeal in 1985, and conclusively exonerated by DNA evidence in 2000. On the 18 April 1983, he was transferred from the Winnipeg Remand Centre to Stony Mountain Penitentiary, where he remained until 25 July 1983. For that entire period, he was kept in segregation, meaning that he was in a cell that measured 1.7 by 3.0 metres (5.5 ft × 10 ft) for 23 hours a day, every day. While this may have been for his own protection, the conditions were harsh. During the one-hour per day that he was let out of his cell for exercise and a shower, there was no allotted place of exercise; he obtained his exercise outside in a narrow courtyard alone, apart from prison guards.
- James Driskell was wrongfully convicted for the murder of Perry Harder in 1991, and served a total of 12 years in Stony Mountain Institution for first-degree murder. In 2005, the Manitoba Department of Justice entered a stay of proceedings and called for a public inquiry, which ended Driskell's conviction without exonerating him. The results of that inquiry were released to the public on 15 February 2007.
- Ernest Cashel was briefly imprisoned at Stony Mountain for theft, until he was transported back to Calgary to face murder charges. His subsequent escape from custody was called "the greatest blow the Mounties had received in all their experience."
- Thomas Hogan, an Ojibway artist, served time for attempted robbery in the 1970s
- Robert B. Russell, one of the leaders during the Winnipeg General Strike, served a two-year sentence at the Manitoba Penitentiary.
- Danny Wolfe, the leader of the Indian Posse spent much of his life at Stony Mountain.

== Books ==
- Friesen, Joe (2016). The Ballad of Danny Wolfe Life of a Modern Outlaw. Toronto: McClelland & Stewart. ISBN 9780771030314.
