= Murder of Fred Fulton and Verna Decarie =

Canadian murderer

- Location: Minto, New Brunswick, Canada
- Date: April 23, 2005; 21 years ago
- Attack type: Murder by stabbing
- Victims: Fred Fulton, aged 74; Veronica "Verna" Decarie, aged 70
- Perpetrator: Gregory Allan Despres
- Charges: First-degree murder (2 counts)
- Verdict: Guilty, but not criminally responsible

On April 23, 2005, Fred Fulton, 74, and Veronica "Verna" Decarie, 70, of Minto, New Brunswick, Canada were stabbed to death, with Fulton also being decapitated with a homemade sword. On March 5, 2008, their neighbour, Gregory Allan Despres, was found guilty for the murder, but not criminally responsible for his actions at the time due to having suffered paranoid schizophrenia-led delusions.

== Murders ==
On the evening April 23, 2005, Despres left his trailer and traveled a short distance on foot to the residence of Fred Fulton and Veronica Decarie. Despres gained access to the house by cutting open the screen of one door with a knife and kicking in the second door.

Despres went to the couple's bedroom where he stabbed Decarie to death. While Fulton attempted to escape the house, he only made it to the porch before being overpowered by Despres. Despres then dragged Fulton back to the kitchen where he decapitated him. While it was originally reported to the media that Despres had thrown Fulton's head out the back door, it was actually found under the kitchen table in a pillowcase.

== Perpetrator ==
Gregory Allan Despres was born in Minto, New Brunswick in July 1982. As a young child, his mother, Jenny Despres, separated from Despres' father. Despres lived a nomadic existence nearly his entire life. In his youth, he moved with his mother to Massachusetts. By the age of 16, Despres' mother began noticing changes in his personality which she dismissed as teenage rebellion. At 17, Despres moved back to Minto.

Despres also severed ties with his mother for almost 2 years, until she herself had returned to Minto. By this time Despres had become isolated from society locking himself away in his residence for long periods of time rarely being seen by outsiders. His mother was concerned, asked him if he was doing drugs. Despres denied it. Despres state continued to deteriorate beyond that point. In 2021, Despres was moved from the Dorchester Penitentiary’s Shepody Healing Centre to the Restigouche Hospital Centre, a less secure location, as an attempt for making better treatment accessible to him. In a hearing that same year in Moncton, the New Brunswick Review Board noted no change in Despres's condition, adding that he constantly refuses treatment. In 2024, the decision transferring Despres to the Restigouche Hospital Centre was reversed after determining him to be a risk to the safety of faculty and patients due to Despres threatening to decapitate a staff worker.

=== Fugitive ===
Shortly after the murders, Despres packed up a car with the murder weapons and drove toward the United States. The car was later found in a gravel pit near the Canada-U.S. border and identified as Fulton's. On April 25, 2005, one day before the bodies were discovered, Despres arrived at the Calais, Maine, border crossing. He presented himself to the U.S. border guards while carrying a homemade sword, a hatchet, a knife, brass knuckles and a chainsaw stained with what appeared to be blood. At the border, Despres boasted of being an assassin for the United States government and of having killed 700. The weapons were confiscated and Despres was fingerprinted. Although it was determined that Despres was due in court to be sentenced for an assault conviction, Despres held U.S. citizenship and under US law, the officers could not legally compel Despres to return to Canada. Although contact was made with the RCMP, they had no other information that would have allowed the officers to detain Despres. The bodies had not yet been discovered. He was therefore properly permitted to enter the United States.

There were however other grounds for possibly detaining Despres that were not acted upon by the border patrol agents. Joseph Gutheinz, a University of Phoenix criminal justice professor said they could have arrested Despres for lying to a customs officer. The comment about 700 kills should have tipped them that he was not telling the truth, he said." Gutheinz, a retired Senior Special Agent who had previously served with three Federal agencies also said "if the customs agents wanted to exercise their discretion in regard to a person who they believed might be mentally ill, there was also a non-criminal option. In Maine, as in many states, there is a protective custody statute, which permits law enforcement officers to take into custody individuals they have reasonable grounds to believe may be an imminent threat to themselves or others. This authority to apprehend and process a person is designed to permit a psychological evaluation.

From there, Despres hitchhiked south to Massachusetts. On April 27, 2005, a Mattapoisett, MA police officer spotted Despres wandering on the side of the road. During a routine check for outstanding warrants, it was found that Despres was expected in court that day in Fredericton, New Brunswick for an assault on Fulton's son-in-law in August 2004.

The day prior, Fulton's daughter discovered the bodies of her father and Decarie at their residence in Minto, New Brunswick. The Royal Canadian Mounted Police (RCMP) quickly suspected Despres and learned later he had been arrested in the United States and was currently jailed in Boston. Despres was extradited from Boston to Fredericton on September 15, 2005.

== Legal proceedings ==
=== First trial ===
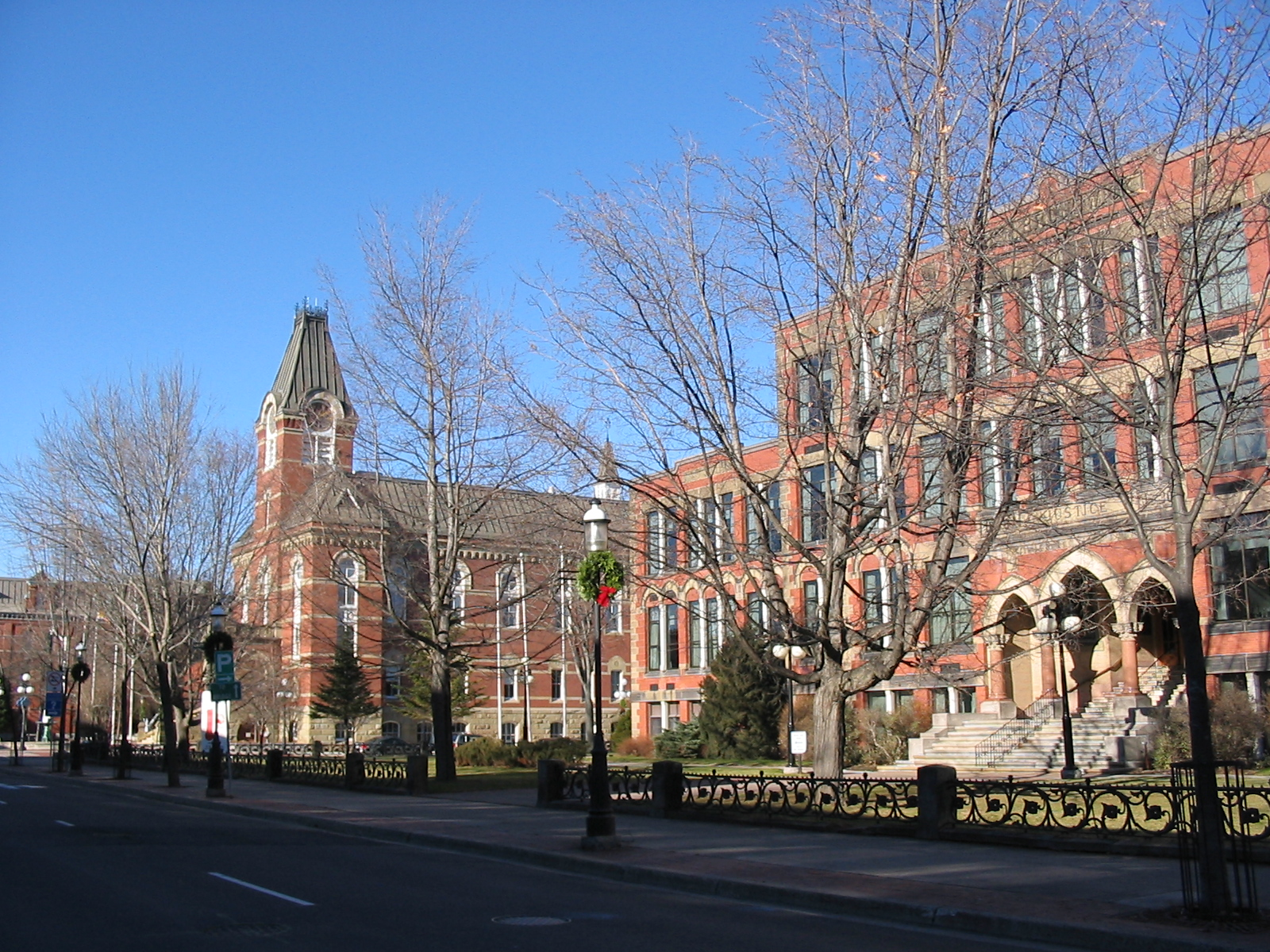
Fredericton Justice Building and City Hall.

Despres' trial was originally scheduled for September 5, 2006. On August 4, 2006, however, Despres fired his lawyer, Randy Maillet, with whom he disagreed on how the defense should be presented. This caused a major delay and the trial date was moved to January 8, 2007.

The Despres trial would be heard by a judge and not a jury. Judge Judy Clendening would preside over the case. The prosecution focused its case on the blood trail, DNA evidence, and his relations with Fulton. The prosecution stated Despres and Fulton were constantly fighting over the waterline, a conflict worsened by Despres' use of recreational drugs.

On February 1, Despres lashed out at his new lawyer, Ed Derrah, accusing him of working for Al-Qaeda and Saddam Hussein. He demanded his lawyer be fired, but Clendenning refused his request. Derrah requested his client be sent for a psychological evaluation; Clendenning agreed and the trial was ended.

Hearings were held on April 24, 25 and 26, 2007. During this time, one expert, Dr. Louis Theriault, said that Despres was unfit to stand trial due to the fact he believe Despres had paranoid schizophrenia. Jeannie, Despres' mother, backed this up by saying her son seemed to act strangely since the age of 17. Another expert testified that Despres was in fact fit to stand trial and that medication could help any mental disorder he was facing. Clendenning disagreed with that theory and ruled that Despres was unfit to stand trial on April 26.

On July 11, 2007, Despres was brought before the provincial mental health review board which found that he had responded well to treatment and was in fact fit to stand trial. A new trial was promptly ordered.

=== Second trial ===
Despres' second trial began on November 5, 2007, and was overheard by Justice William Grant. Evidence from the first trial was admitted into court.

On the second day of the trial, Despres' grandfather, Adolph, testified that Despres had repeatedly tried to join the military and had been rejected every time. He also testified that Despres would stay in his room for hours talking to himself. Also presented this day was a video of the crime scene which showed graphic images of Fulton's house. The video clearly showed blood on the walls of the bedroom and Decaries' body on the floor, it also showed the blood smeared kitchen where Fulton's decapitated body was sprawled out. It then showed the pillow case in which Fulton's head was found.

On day three, Fulton's grandson, Fred Mowat, testified before the court that his grandfather feared Despres and often required medications to sleep at night. Mowat also testified that he and Despres had had a fight in 2004 over noise coming from his trailer, and that Despres pulled a knife on him. Charges were filed in this incident and Despres was found guilty (it was prior to being sentenced for this crime that Despres allegedly committed the murders of Fulton and Decarie and fled across the U.S. border). On day four, the court heard from one witness who had seen Despres cross the U.S. border and another witness who had picked him up hitchhiking and drove him south.

On November 16, the court adjourned Despres' trial until January 2008, allowing counsel time to prepare expert witnesses.

On January 28, 2008, the trial continued with defense presenting Despres' mother and Dr. Scott Theriault, a psychiatrist, as witnesses. The testimony and evidence given went to the issue of whether the defendant's mental state could allow him to be criminally responsible in the case he did commit the murders. On January 29, 2008, Despres' psychiatrist, Dr. Louis Theriault, also presented evidence going to the issue of Despres' mental state (it is coincidence that both psychiatrists share the same surname). On January 30, 2008, prosecution and defense presented their summation to the court and Justice Grant reserved decision until March 5, 2008. In Canadian criminal law, while the burden of proof which must be met to find the accused guilty of a crime is that of "beyond a reasonable doubt", the burden of proof for the defense of non-criminal responsibility based on mental condition is the lower standard of a "balance of probabilities".

=== Court's decision ===
On March 5, 2008, Justice Grant found Gregory Despres guilty of causing the deaths of Fred Fulton and Verna Decarie in 2005. However, Justice Grant agreed with the defense in finding that Despres was not criminally responsible for his actions at the time. Despres is currently being held at Shepody Healing Centre which is part of the Dorchester Penitentiary. Due to his non-criminal responsibility stemming from delusions caused by paranoid schizophrenia, Despres has his case reviewed by the New Brunswick Mental Health Review Board every two years.

The killings were cited as a prominent example of a successful defense of not criminally responsible.

=== Transfer request ===
In March, 2019, Despres requested during his semi-annual meeting with the review board to be transferred from New Brunswick to the closest high-security psychiatric facility where English is spoken; the Waypoint Health Centre for Mental Health in Penetanguishene, Ontario. The board recommended the transfer take place, but the decision was later rejected by the Attorney General.
