= Roch Thériault =

Canadian cult leader and murderer (1947–2011)

- Born: May 16, 1947; Rivière-du-Moulin, Quebec, Canada
- Died: February 26, 2011 (aged 63); Dorchester Penitentiary, New Brunswick, Canada
- Cause of death: Stabbed in neck with a shiv in Dorchester Penitentiary by his cellmate, Matthew Gerrard MacDonald
- Occupation: Cult leader
- Children: 26
- Conviction: Second degree murder
- Penalty: Life imprisonment

Roch Thériault (also spelled Rock Thériault; [ʁɔk te.ʁjo]; May 16, 1947 – February 26, 2011) was a Canadian cult leader and convicted murderer. Thériault, a self-proclaimed prophet under the name Moïse [mɔ.iz] (French for "Moses"), founded the Ant Hill Kids (Les Enfants de la Fourmilière) in 1977. They were a doomsday cult whose beliefs were based on those of the Seventh-day Adventist Church. In April 1978, Thériault was removed from the Seventh-day Adventist Church. He maintained multiple wives and concubines, impregnating all female members as a religious requirement, and fathering 26 children. Thériault's followers, including 12 adults and 22 children, lived under his totalitarian rule in a commune and were subject to severe physical and sexual abuse.

Thériault was arrested for assault in 1989, dissolving the cult. In 1993, he was convicted for the murder of follower Solange Boilard. He had previously killed an infant named Samuel Giguère, while two of his disciples, Geraldine Gagné Auclair and Solange Boilard, died following treatments administered to them by Thériault. Thériault received a life sentence, which he was serving when he was murdered at Dorchester Penitentiary in 2011. Thériault, along with Robert Pickton, Clifford Olson and Paul Bernardo, has been considered one of Canada's most notorious criminals since the 1980s.

== Early life ==
Roch Thériault was born in the village of Rivière-du-Moulin (now part of Sanguenay city), Quebec, on May 16, 1947, into a poor French-Canadian Catholic family, and was raised in Thetford Mines. As a child Thériault was considered to be very intelligent, but dropped out of school in the seventh grade and worked different odd jobs before he finally founded a small woodwork business.

In 1967, Thériault married a woman named Francine Grenier and had two sons with her, Roch-Sylvain and François. Grenier and Thériault divorced in 1976.

In 1972, he began to teach himself the Old Testament of the Bible after he met an adventist Pastor. Thériault believed that the end of the world was near and would be brought on by the war between good and evil. Thériault converted from Catholicism to the Seventh-day Adventist Church in January 1977, and began practising the denomination's regular holistic beliefs which encouraged a healthy lifestyle free of unhealthy foods and tobacco.

== Ant Hill Kids ==
In the mid-1970s, Thériault convinced a group of people to leave their jobs and homes to join him in a religious movement. Thériault formed the cult in 1977 in Sainte-Marie, Quebec with the goal to form a commune where people could freely listen to his motivational speeches, live in unity and equality, and be free of sin. He prohibited the group from remaining in contact with their families and with the Seventh-day Adventist Church, as this was against his cult's values of freedom. Thériault's fear of the end of the world grew, claiming that God had warned him that it would come in February 1979, and used the commune to prepare for it. In 1978, in preparation, Thériault moved his commune by hiking to a mountainside he called "Eternal Mountain" in Hope, in the sparsely populated Gaspé Peninsula, where he claimed they could all be saved. There, Thériault made the commune build their town while he relaxed, comparing them to ants working in an ant hill and naming the group the Ant Hill Kids. In February 1979, when the apocalypse did not occur, people started questioning Thériault's wisdom, but he defended himself by saying that time on Earth and in God's world were not parallel, and that therefore it was a miscalculation. To expand the community as well as keep the members devoted, Thériault married and impregnated all of the women in the commune, fathering over 20 children with 9 female members of the group. By the 1980s, there were nearly 40 members. Followers were made to wear identical tunics to represent equality and their devotion to the commune.

In 1984, the group relocated from Quebec to a new site near Burnt River, a hamlet in Central Ontario which is now part of the city of Kawartha Lakes.

=== Abuse ===
Following the cult's formation, Thériault began to move away from being a motivational leader as his drinking problem worsened, exerting an increasingly totalitarian control over the lives of his followers and becoming irrational in his beliefs. Members were not allowed to speak to each other when he was not present, nor to have sex with each other without his permission. Thériault used his charisma to cover for his increasingly abusive and erratic behaviour, and none of the other members questioned his judgement or openly blamed him for any physical, mental or emotional damage. Thériault began to inflict punishments on followers that he considered to be straying, by spying on them and claiming that God told him what they did. If a person wished to leave the commune, Thériault would hit them with either a belt or hammer, suspend them from the ceiling, pluck each of their body hairs individually, or even defecate on them. The Ant Hill Kids raised money for living by selling baked goods, and members who did not bring in enough money were also punished.

Over time, Thériault's punishments became increasingly extreme and violent, including making members break their own legs with sledgehammers, sit on lit stoves, shoot each other in the shoulders, and eat dead mice and faeces. A follower would sometimes be asked to cut off another follower's toes with wire cutters to prove loyalty. The abuse extended to the cult's children, who were sexually abused, held over fires, or nailed to trees while other children threw stones at them. One of Thériault's wives left a newborn child, Eleazar Lavallée, outside to die in freezing temperatures to keep him away from the abuse. Thériault attempted to backtrack to the original religious mission of the commune, beginning to strongly believe in purifying his followers and ridding them of their sins through abusive purification sessions where the members would be completely nude as he whipped and beat them. Thériault claimed to be a holy being, and started performing unnecessary amateur surgical operations on sick members to demonstrate his healing powers. These "surgeries" included injecting a 94% ethanol solution into stomachs, or performing circumcisions on the children and adults of the group. In 1987, social workers removed 17 of the children from the commune. However, Thériault faced no repercussions for his abusive acts.

In 1989, when follower Solange Boilard complained of an upset stomach, Thériault performed another amateur surgery without anaesthesia. He laid her naked on a table, and punched her in the stomach, then forced a plastic tube into her rectum to perform a crude enema with molasses and olive oil. He cut open her abdomen with a knife and ripped out part of her intestines with his bare hands. Thériault made another member, Gabrielle Lavallée, stitch her up using needle and thread, and had the other women shove a tube down her throat and blow through it. Boilard died the next day from the damage inflicted by the procedures. Claiming to have the power of resurrection, Thériault had his followers saw off the cap of Boilard's skull and he ejaculated onto her brain. When Boilard did not return to life, her corpse was buried a short distance from the Ant Hill Kids' commune.

== Arrest and conviction ==
Lavallée underwent harsh treatment at the Ontario commune during the late 1980s, suffering welding torch burns to her genitals, a hypodermic needle breaking off in her back, and eight of her teeth being forcibly removed. Lavallée attempted to escape from the commune after Thériault cut off parts of her breast and smashed her head in with the blunt side of an axe, but upon her return he removed one of her fingers with wire cutters, pinned her hand to a wooden table with a hunting knife, and then used a cleaver to amputate her arm.

In 1989, Thériault was arrested for assault after Lavallée had fled the commune again and contacted authorities, effectively dissolving the Ant Hill Kids. Provincial authorities had long-held suspicions about Thériault's cult due to the particularly primitive living conditions of its membership, but because the commune was officially registered as a church, officials were legally unable to investigate the adults, and could not do much except ensure the welfare of the children. Thériault was found guilty of assault for the amputation of Lavallée's arm and received a sentence of 12 years' imprisonment. Lavallée's report allowed further investigation into Thériault's actions, exposing the wider abuses at the communes and Solange Boilard's murder. In 1993, Thériault pleaded guilty to second-degree murder for the death of Solange Boilard, and was sentenced to life imprisonment.

== Life in prison and death ==
The vast majority of the cult's followers abandoned Thériault after his arrest, but Francine Laflamme, Chantal Labrie and Nicole Ruel remained loyal, with whom Thériault fathered four more children, conceived during conjugal visits. All four babies were taken by child welfare services and put up for adoption.

In 2000, Thériault was transferred to Dorchester Penitentiary, a medium-security prison in Dorchester, New Brunswick. In 2002, Thériault was rejected for parole as he was considered too high a risk to reoffend, and he never applied again. Between 2002 and 2006, Laflamme, Labrie, and Ruel left Thériault and returned to Quebec.

In 2009, Thériault tried to sell his artwork on a United States-based website MurderAuction.com, which called itself a "true crime auction house" and was willing to sell some of Thériault's drawings and poetry. The Correctional Service of Canada prevented Thériault's works leaving Dorchester Penitentiary, and Stockwell Day, the Canadian federal Public Safety Minister at the time, wrote to the Correctional Service to express concern that the killer was benefiting from work in prison.

On February 26, 2011, at age 63, Thériault was found dead near his cell at Dorchester Penitentiary. His death is believed to be the result of an altercation with his cellmate, Matthew Gerrard MacDonald, a 60-year-old convicted murderer from Port au Port, Newfoundland and Labrador, who was charged with the killing. MacDonald pleaded guilty to second-degree murder and was sentenced to life in prison, having already been serving a life sentence for a previous murder charge. MacDonald had stabbed Thériault in the neck with a shiv, walked to the officers station, handed them the weapon, and proclaimed "That piece of shit is down on the range. Here's the knife, I've sliced him up."

== Aftermath ==
Two Maclean's magazine journalists expanded their feature article about Thériault and the Ant Hill Kids into a book called Savage Messiah: The Shocking Story of Cult Leader Rock Thériault and the Women Who Loved Him, which was published in 1993, and as a paperback in 1994.

Gabrielle Lavallée's account of her experiences, L'alliance de la brebis, ('Alliance of the ewe') was published in 1993, 1994, and 2002.

Francine Laflamme published a book, Roch Thériault dit Moïse, ('Roch Thériault, known as Moses') in 1997.

The 2002 film Savage Messiah depicts Thériault's crimes against his followers and the ensuing legal recourse. The film stars Luc Picard as Thériault, and Polly Walker as Paula Jackson, the social worker whose investigation revealed the crimes.

Thériault's two sons from his first marriage, Roch-Sylvain and François, wrote about their experiences growing up in the cult in a book titled Les fils de Moïse: Frères de sang ('The sons of Moses: Blood brothers'), published in 2009.
