= Transgender prison policies in Canada =

In December 2017, Canada's federal correctional system implemented a policy allowing prisoners to be assigned to living units based on their self-identified gender. This policy, established by Correctional Service Canada (CSC), allows individuals to be placed in either men's or women's institutions according to their gender identity, irrespective of their biological sex or the gender indicated on their identification documents.

== Commissioner's Directive 100: Gender Diverse Offenders ==
Commissioner's Directive 100, issued by the Correctional Service of Canada (CSC), outlines procedural modifications aimed at addressing the needs of gender-diverse offenders within the correctional system. The directive emphasizes respect for human rights, safety, and dignity of gender-diverse individuals, while also considering the safety of other inmates and staff in institutional and community settings. This policy applies to all CSC personnel who interact with gender-diverse offenders, providing guidance on accommodations and protocols to ensure equitable treatment. The directive reflects CSC's commitment to adapting its practices to better serve the diverse needs of its offender population, aligning with broader human rights considerations and legislative changes in Canada. In 2021, it was reported that 10 transgender women and 12 transgender men were incarcerated at institutions for women, and no transgender men had been transferred to male facilities. In 2024, there are still instances of transgender inmate abuse and discrimination in Canada.
