= Ferndale Institution =

Prison in British Columbia, Canada

Coordinates: 49°9′35″N 122°17′25″W

- Interactive map of Ferndale Institution
- Capacity: 166
- Opened: 1973
- Managed by: Correctional Service of Canada
- Website: http://www.csc-scc.gc.ca/institutions/001002-5002-eng.shtml

Ferndale Institution is the former name of the minimum-security federal correctional annex of Mission Institution, now referred to as Mission Minimum Institution. It is located in Mission, British Columbia, in the central Fraser Valley, about 80 kilometres east of Vancouver. Ferndale opened in 1973 and can house up to 166 inmates, who live in residential-style units on a federal reserve shared with Mission Institution.

The current Warden is Shawn Huish.

Previous warden Ron Wiebe (deceased) was the founder of the "Restorative Justice" project, which brought together offenders, victims and their families for reconciliation/mediation.

== Inmates ==
Offenders housed at Ferndale are classified minimum security. Correctional Service Canada calls these Level II prisons.

Most offenders have "cascaded" down from maximum or medium security (levels IV or III). Strict guidelines need to be met to reach minimum security. The Security Reclassification Scale is used to determine suitability for minimum security.

Many Ferndale inmates are at pre-release status, meaning they are very close to reintegration into society. All required programming/expectations laid out in the offenders correctional plan, created on arrival in prison, must have been completed to reach this level. Institutional behavior must be stellar, and all drug tests negative. Other factors such as community support are also considered.

In 2008, a directive from Ottawa was given to involuntarily transfer all inmates with the "Dangerous Offender" (DO) classification to higher security prisons (medium or maximum).

Some non-violent offenders may be directly classified to minimum security without cascading.

There is also a small contingent of those serving life sentences who have served substantial portions of their parole eligibility terms, normally more than 15 years, and have good institutional records. (e.g. Colin Thatcher).

== Escapes ==
Escapes, which the Correctional Service of Canada calls "Walk-Aways" since there is no fence or security barriers around a minimum-security federal facility in Canada, are listed chronologically:

- John Norman Mackenzie, life sentence for 2nd degree murder – On August 7, 2018, John Norman Mackenzie was discovered missing during a head count at 10:15 PM.
- Robert Raymond Dezwaan, life sentence for 2nd degree murder – On April 14, 2017, Robert Raymond Dezwaan was discovered missing during a head count at 3:45 PM.
- Andrew David Shizgal, 10 years for Break and Enter – On May 23, 2011, inmate Andrew David Shizgal, was discovered missing during the Ferndale Institution 7:00 PM count.
- James Edward Rogers, Life sentence for 1st degree murder - April 17, 2011 - James Edward Rogers was discovered missing from Ferndale after the morning head count at 7:30 a.m. PT. He was apprehended hours later by Mission RCMP.
- Blane MacDougal, life for murder, indecent assault, sexual assault with a weapon and kidnapping - April 2008.
- Michael Grant, two-year, four-month sentence for fraud and possession of property obtained by crime - November 2007.
- Gary George Fitzgerald, life for murdering a police officer and gas station attendant - November 2000.
- Darryl Wayne Claughton, life for murder - November 1999.
- Cronin and Roberts - Escaped to Washington state and committed murder -1994 (high profile incident).

== Controversies ==
The institution included a complete 9-hole golf course for most of its existence. The course was often played by community groups from the Mission, BC, area as well as inmates. It was also utilized in training inmates in landscaping, and horticulture vocations, and to foster positive recreational habits for inmates. The golf course was eventually removed due to public outrage.

For several years, Colin Thatcher, a former Saskatchewan politician convicted for murdering his wife in 1984, was housed at Ferndale Institution. He was allowed to bring horses from his ranch in Saskatoon to the penitentiary reserve, but after public outrage this special privilege was discontinued.
