= Derek Bedson =

Canadian civil servant (1920–1989)

- Born: October 21, 1920; London, England
- Died: May 14, 1989 (aged 68); Winnipeg, Manitoba
- Occupation: civil servant
- Years active: 1947-1981
- Awards: Order of Canada

Derek Robert Campbell Bedson, OC (October 21, 1920 – May 14, 1989) was a Canadian civil servant.

Born in London, England, the grandson of Samuel Lawrence Bedson, he was raised in Manitoba. In 1941, he received a Bachelor of Arts in history from the University of Manitoba. He studied at Balliol College, Oxford, after serving in the Royal Canadian Army Service Corps during World War II. While at Oxford, he formed a lifelong friendship with George Grant.

In 1947, he joined the federal civil service. He worked two years with the Ministry of Mines and Resources before he became a Foreign Services Officer with External Affairs from 1949 to 1955. From 1953 to 1955, he was with the Canadian delegation at the United Nations.

In 1955, he became the private secretary of George Drew. In 1956, Drew was replaced by John Diefenbaker and he became his private secretary as well. In 1958, Duff Roblin appointed him Clerk of the Executive Council of Manitoba. He served until he was forced to resign in 1981.

In 1978, he was made an Officer of the Order of Canada.
