= Beaver Creek Institution =

Prison in Ontario, Canada

- Interactive map of Beaver Creek Institution
- Location: Gravenhurst, Ontario; 44.9620°N 79.2990°W
- Status: Active
- Security class: Minimum and Medium security
- Capacity: 717
- Opened: 1961 (Min) 1998 (Med)
- Former name: Fenbrook Institution
- Managed by: Correctional Service Canada

Beaver Creek Institution is a minimum and medium security federal prison operated by the Correctional Service of Canada in Gravenhurst, Ontario. It has a rated capacity of 717 inmates.

The minimum security site was opened in 1961 and currently has the capacity to house 201 inmates in five residential style units. Another 50 bed unit was added in 2015.

The medium security unit was opened as Fenbrook Institution in 1998. It was merged with the minimum security unit in April 2014. The medium site has a capacity of 516 inmates after a new 96 bed unit was opened in 2014.
