= Fenbrook Institution =

Prison in Ontario, Canada

- Interactive map of Fenbrook Institution
- Location: Gravenhurst, Ontario
- Status: Closed (Merged with Beaver Creek Institution)
- Security class: Medium security
- Opened: 1998
- Closed: 2014
- Managed by: Correctional Service Canada

Fenbrook Institution is a Canadian medium security prison located in Gravenhurst, Ontario. It was merged with Beaver Creek Institution on April 1, 2014. It is now referred to as Beaver Creek Institution, Medium Unit.

The Canadian government announced plans to build the prison in 1992. A contract for the building's construction was awarded in 1996, and the facility opened in 1998. According to the Government of Canada, it can accommodate as many as 404 inmates. A new unit is being constructed that will house an additional 96 inmates and is scheduled to open in April 2014.
