= Shepody Healing Centre =

Secure hospital in New Brunswick, Canada

Shepody Healing Centre, established in 2001, is a multi-level security facility at Dorchester Penitentiary in Dorchester, New Brunswick, serving male offenders with serious mental health conditions. As one of five regional treatment centres operated by Correctional Service Canada (CSC), the Centre also provides inpatient and outpatient emergency and consultative services to other facilities in the Atlantic Region.

The Centre houses those who are deemed not criminally responsible. With a maximum capacity of 53, the Centre has 38 multi-level beds, along with 15 mental health transition beds at Dorchester Penitentiary.

Gregory Despres is among the Centre's more notable inmates.
