= Matsqui Institution =

Prison in Abbotsford, British Columbia

- Interactive map of Matsqui Institution
- Location: Abbotsford, British Columbia, Canada; 49.0278°N 122.3038°W
- Status: Operational
- Security class: Medium
- Capacity: 437
- Opened: 1966
- Managed by: Correctional Service of Canada
- Website: csc-scc.gc.ca/institutions/001002-5005-eng.shtml

Matsqui Institution is a federal medium-security prison facility in Abbotsford, British Columbia, Canada, about 70 kilometres east of Vancouver. The Institution is operated by the Correctional Service of Canada and was opened in 1966. Accommodations for the general population are provided in a three-story living unit with a central core of security control posts. Matsqui provides a number of basic programs, as well as vocational training programs and the Aboriginal Basic Healing Program, which focuses on First Nations. Work is completed to increase capacity at the Institution. Construction of one new 96-bed living unit has been completed and was opened in 2013.

== Management ==
Warden: Morgan ANDREASSEN

Deputy Warden: Corinne JUSTASON

== Facility characteristics ==
- Institution for male offenders
- Security level: medium
- Date opened: 1966
- Number of employees: 313

== Major incidents ==
June 2, 1981: Major riot, 300 inmates seized control of the facility, torching seven of the prison's buildings and causing millions of dollars' worth of damage. Actions taken by Corporal Patrick Aloysius Kevin McBride during the riot to rescue eight staff members from a burning roof led to his receiving a second medal of honour for heroism in the same year from the Governor General.

January 2005: Lockdown and search of the institution discovered one round of ammunition, cell phone, cell phone charger, tattoo needles, small amounts of drugs (marijuana), homemade alcohol, and a homemade knife. There was also unsubstantiated information about possible escape planning.

August 2008: Inmate stabbed, airlifted to hospital

January 2008: Major disturbance involving upwards of 170 inmates in the recreational yard lighting fires and damaging property. ERT called in.

December 10, 11, & 12, 2009: Multiple near-fatal overdoses

December 21, 2009: Contraband package found in a tree inside perimeter fence. Contained 10 packages of tobacco.

December 27, 2009: Three inmates sent to outside hospital after being assaulted, one stabbed.

March 2010: Inmate Assault

April 2010: Two large packages of contraband intercepted at perimeter fence. Contained tobacco, cell phones, narcotics.

May 2010: Inmate assaulted causing a lockdown. Brew (homemade alcohol) found

November 4, 2010: Lockdown and exceptional search of the institution due to numerous inmates requesting protection and the finding of a sharp-edged weapon, drugs, tobacco and other unauthorized materials. Officers also had to respond to an inmate fight just prior to the lock down.

January 12, 2011: An inmate was found to have been seriously assaulted. The injured inmate was escorted to outside hospital for treatment, and the institution was immediately placed on lockdown.

April 2011: Inmate Assault

September 12, 2011: Torben Campbell, an inmate, died while at outside hospital for treatment.

January 2012: Inmate stabbed, institution locked down.
