= Atlantic Institution =

Prison in New Brunswick, Canada

Coordinates: 46.7970°N 65.8048°W

- Interactive map of Atlantic Institution
- Location: Renous, Blackville Parish, Northumberland County, New Brunswick
- Security class: Maximum security
- Capacity: 331
- Population: 228
- Opened: 1987
- Managed by: Correctional Service of Canada

Atlantic Institution (French: Établissement de l'Atlantique) is a Canadian maximum security prison for men. It is located in Renous, a rural community about 30 kilometres from Miramichi, New Brunswick at the confluence of the Renous and Southwest Miramichi rivers.

== History ==
The institution was opened in 1987 on property that had formerly been used as an ammunition depot by the Canadian Forces.

Renous was selected as the site for the new maximum security prison for Atlantic Canada during the early 1980s after the aging Dorchester Penitentiary was evaluated as being unsuitable for the changing focus of correctional services for repeat and violent offenders.

Following the opening of Atlantic Institution, the Dorchester Penitentiary was downgraded to handle medium security prisoners in conjunction with the Springhill Institution.

== Notable inmates ==
- Justin Bourque, perpetrator of the 2014 Moncton shootings.
- Allan Legere, serial killer.
