= Rockwood Institution =

Prison in Stony Mountain, Canada

Coordinates: 50.082°N 97.225°W

Rockwood Institution is a federal minimum-security facility located in the community of Stony Mountain, Rural Municipality of Rockwood, Manitoba, about 11 mi (18 km) from Winnipeg. It opened in 1962 and can accommodate up to 167 inmates.

== History ==
Rockwood Institution, adjacent to Stony Mountain Institution, originally opened in 1962. It was refurbished in 1997 to provide 16 six-bed pods combined with nine 8-bed pods. The rated capacity is 167 inmates.

In December 2010, the new warden. Mike Pollman, took over the responsibility of overseeing the 114-inmate minimum security facility, after being appointed to the position in August 2010. He had served as deputy warden at Rockwood Institution, as well as at the neighbouring Stony Mountain Institution. "I count myself extremely fortunate to be taking over an institution I know very well," Pollman said during some brief remarks after he took his oath of responsibility.

In November 2010, the Federal Minister of Public Safety, Vic Toews, announced that Rockwood Institution will be getting 50 new beds in an expansion planned for both this institution and Stony Mountain Institution. The Rockwood portion of the project should be completed by 2013. While Stony Mountain is getting a new maximum-security wing as part of this expansion, the Rockwood Institution will retain its minimum-security status.

== Characteristics ==
- Male offenders
- Security level: minimum
- Date opened: 1962
- Number of inmates: 217
- Average length of sentences:

Less than 40 months: 38 per cent of inmates
More than 40 months: 42 per cent of inmates
Life sentence: 20 per cent of inmates

- Number of employees: 72
