= Westmorland Institution =

Canadian federal corrections facility

- Interactive map of Westmorland Institution
- Location: Dorchester, New Brunswick; 45.9138°N 64.5098°W
- Security class: minimum security
- Capacity: 252
- Opened: 1962
- Managed by: Correctional Service of Canada

The Westmorland Institution is a Canadian federal corrections facility located in the village of Dorchester, New Brunswick. It shares a property with Dorchester Penitentiary and Shepody Healing Centre.

== History ==
It was opened in 1962 as a minimum security prison on a hill overlooking the Memramcook River valley.
