= Grierson Centre =

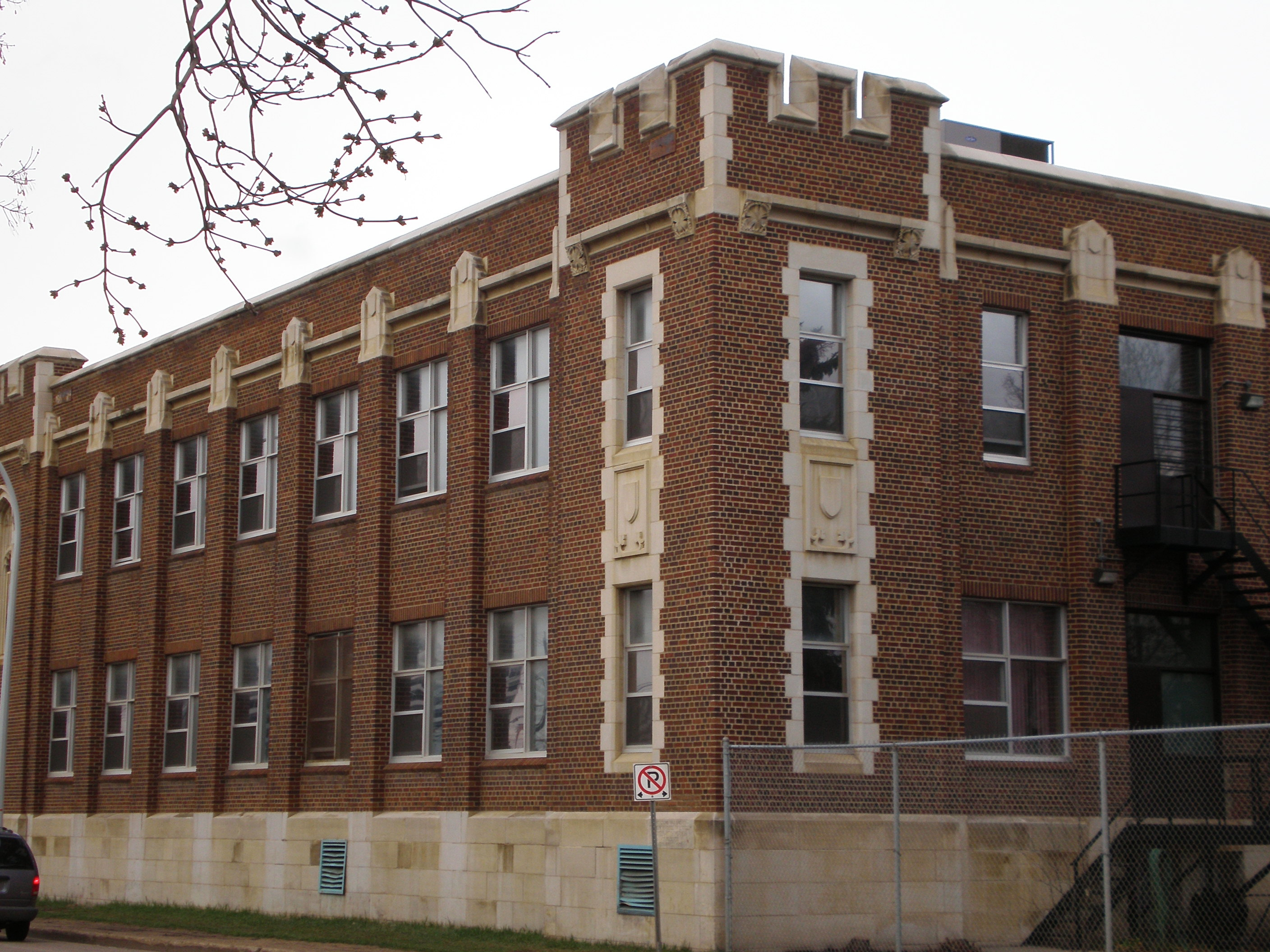
- Main building at the Grierson Centre.
- Interactive map of the Grierson Centre area
- Former names: Royal Canadian Mounted Police Building
- Alternative names: Grierson Institution

General information
- Type: Minimum Security Prison
- Architectural style: Collegiate Gothic & Tudor Gothic
- Location: Edmonton, Alberta, Canada
- Coordinates: 53°32′38″N 113°28′46″W
- Completed: 1912 (Barrack Block); 1936 (Addition); 1957 (Addition)
- Opened: 1912 (RCMP); 1998; 28 years ago (Prison)
- Closed: 1975 (RCMP)
- Cost: CA$70,000 (1912)
- Client: Correctional Service Canada

Design and construction
- Architect: Roland Lines

The Grierson Centre, also known as Grierson Institution, is a minimum security prison and historic site in Downtown Edmonton, Alberta, Canada. The institution is operated by the Correctional Service of Canada.

The Grierson Centre originally served as the North-West Mounted Police's Divisional headquarters in Edmonton upon its completion in 1912. Prior to 1912, the detachment was stationed in Fort Saskatchewan for a period of 34 years before moving to the growing City of Edmonton. The barracks, as designed by architect Roland Lines, were completed at a cost of CA$70,000 and included stables and ten cells within the complex.

One of the buildings in the Grierson Centre, former RCMP Centre Building 3, was designated a Recognized Federal Heritage Building on January 17, 1985. The compound was expanded in 1936 and again in 1957 to meet the growing needs of the RCMP detachment. In 1975 the RCMP would vacate the site, and the property would fall into the use of Correctional Service of Canada.
