= Thomas Sophonow =

Canadian wrongfully accused of murder

Thomas Sophonow (born March 1953) is a Canadian who was wrongfully convicted of murder and whose case was the subject of a major judicial inquiry. Sophonow was tried three times in the 1981 murder of doughnut-shop clerk Barbara Stoppel. Sophonow spent four years imprisoned. In 1985, he was acquitted by the Manitoba Court of Appeal. A commission of inquiry was called by the province of Manitoba which led to the 2001 release of the Thomas Sophonow Inquiry Report. This inquiry was led by former Supreme Court justice Peter Cory. As a result of this report, Manitoba revised its policy of using prisoners in-custody as informants. This policy is located at Appendix F of the report. The inquiry also made 43 recommendations of which 11 related to the Province of Manitoba.

== See also ==
- Overturned convictions in Canada
- List of miscarriage of justice case’s
