= Drumheller Institution =

Medium-security prison in Drumheller, Canada

Coordinates: 51.42604°N 112.69373°W

- Interactive map of Drumheller Institution
- Location: Drumheller, Alberta
- Security class: Medium security
- Capacity: 598
- Opened: 1967
- Managed by: Correctional Service of Canada

The Drumheller Institution is a medium-security prison operated in Drumheller, Alberta by the Correctional Service of Canada. It was opened in 1967, and also includes 122 person capacity minimum-security facility as of 2024. As of 2023, the medium security section had a rated capacity of 582.
