= Bedson Ridge =

Ridge in Alberta, Canada

Coordinates: 53.26677°N 117.91909°W

Bedson Ridge is a ridge in the Rocky Mountains located in Alberta, Canada. The ridge is located approximately 50 km (31 mi) east of Jasper and is often used for rock climbing.

Bedson Ridge most likely has the name of a Manitoba prison warden.
