= Mission Institution =

Prison in British Columbia, Canada

Coordinates: 49°9′50″N 122°17′20″W

- Interactive map of Mission Institution
- Location: Mission, British Columbia, Canada
- Capacity: Medium: 324; Minimum: 216
- Opened: April 1977

Mission Institution is a minimum and medium security federal institution within the Correctional Service of Canada and is located in Mission, British Columbia. It has a capacity of 540 inmates: 324 in medium security and 216 in minimum security. Mission Institution is broken up into 6 living units, with that also accommodates inmates from neighboring [Mission Minimum Institution]. Mission Institution has several industries building, allowing inmates to be employed to build numerous products.

The institution was the site of a COVID-19 outbreak, where at least 133 inmates and staff had tested positive for the virus, with one death. The Provincial Health Services Authority's Mobile Medical Unit (MMU) was set up in a secure area at Abbotsford Regional Hospital, in order to assist with controlling the outbreak.
