= Dorchester Penitentiary =

Prison in New Brunswick, Canada

Coordinates: 45°54′41″N 64°30′38″W

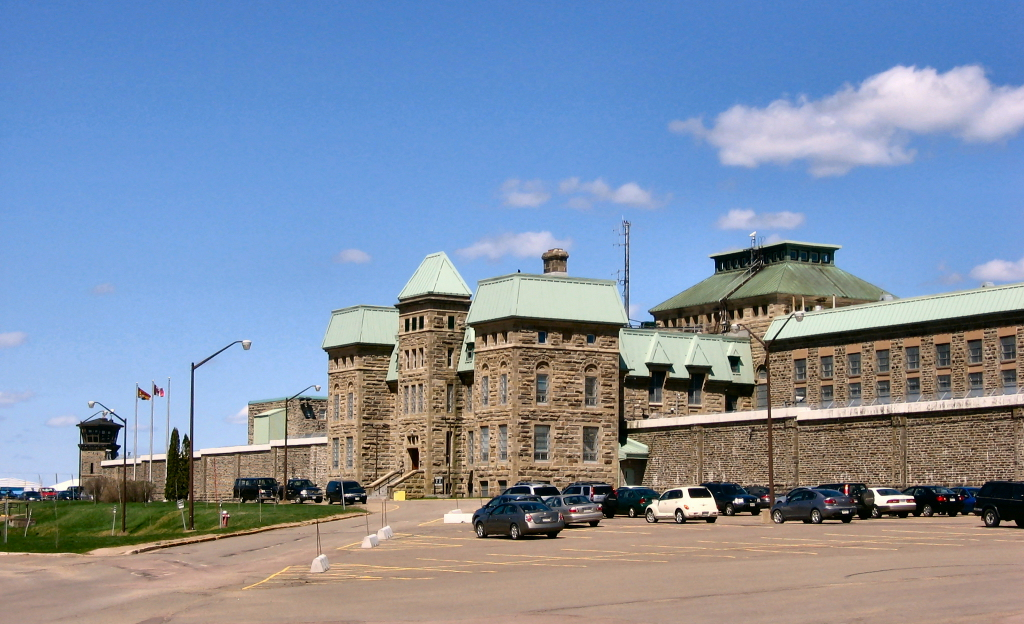
- Interactive map of Dorchester Penitentiary
- Location: Dorchester, New Brunswick
- Security class: Medium security (formerly maximum)
- Capacity: 392
- Opened: July 14, 1880
- Managed by: Correctional Service of Canada

The Dorchester Penitentiary (French: Pénitencier de Dorchester) is a Canadian federal corrections facility located in the village of Dorchester, New Brunswick. It shares a property with Westmorland Institution and Shepody Healing Centre.

== History ==
It was opened on 14 July 1880 as a maximum security penitentiary on a hill overlooking the Memramcook River valley. It is now, having been built three years after Stony Mountain Institution (1877), the second oldest federal corrections facility in Canada still in operation following the closure of Kingston Penitentiary on September 30, 2013.

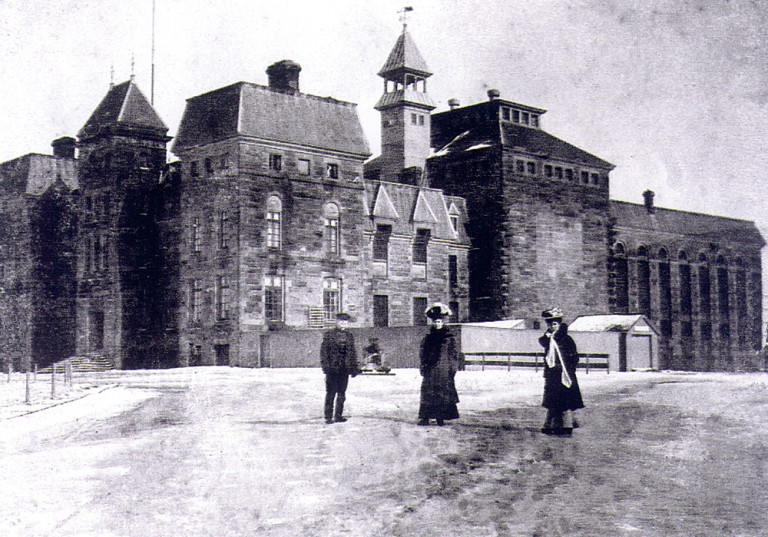
Dorchester Penitentiary, c. 1900

The prison became notorious following World War II as it was responsible for all maximum security offenders in Atlantic Canada. It was replaced by the modern Atlantic Institution in Renous and was downgraded to handle medium security offenders.

Together with Springhill Institution, Dorchester Penitentiary handles all medium security offenders in the federal system in Atlantic Canada. Springhill Institution has a younger and commensurately more impulsive offender population, whereas Dorchester Penitentiary has specialized in handling Protective Custody offenders in need of treatment and providing psychiatric services to CSC Atlantic Region, therefore having an older offender population.

Dorchester Penitentiary recently installed a wind turbine, making it just one of two federal penitentiaries in Canada with such a device.

In 2015 Dorchester Pen & Westmorland merged to form Dorchester Institution. They are now referred to as Dorchester Medium Sector (formerly Dorchester Penitentiary) & Dorchester Minimum sector (formerly Westmorland Institution).

== Notable inmates ==
- Kurt Meyer, Waffen-SS major-general convicted of war crimes for his role in the killing of Canadian soldiers in the Ardenne Abbey massacre
- David William Ramsay, judge convicted of sexual abuse of teenage girls
- Roch Thériault, doomsday cult leader
- Jeffrey Paul Delisle, Royal Canadian Navy officer convicted of passing secret information to a foreign entity (Russia)
