= Springhill Institution =

Prison in Nova Scotia, Canada

Coordinates: 45°37′27″N 64°04′15″W

- Interactive map of Springhill Institution
- Location: Springhill, Nova Scotia
- Security class: Medium security
- Capacity: 636
- Population: 455
- Opened: October 15, 1967
- Managed by: Correctional Service of Canada

The Springhill Institution (French: Établissement de Springhill) is a Canadian federal corrections facility located in the town of Springhill, Nova Scotia.

== History ==
It was opened on 15 October 1967 on the southwestern edge of the former coal mining town on the northern edge of the Cobequid Mountains; occupying 167 hectares of land on a plateau overlooking the area, it is described as the largest "fenced" correctional facility in Canada.

Springhill was selected as the site for the medium security prison for Atlantic Canada during the early 1960s, partly as an economic diversification strategy following the closure of the town's largest employer, a coal mine that was permanently shut in 1958 following the Springhill Mining Disaster.

Until the opening of the maximum security Atlantic Institution in central New Brunswick in 1987, Springhill provided all medium security correctional services for the region; after 1987, part of Dorchester Penitentiary was downgraded to handle medium security prisoners as well.

Springhill Institution is also the location of the Regional Reception Centre (RRC) which handles the intake of all offenders directly from the court system.
