= Correctional Service Canada =

Canadian federal government agency

Correctional Service Canada Service correctionnel Canada
- Badge of the CSC

- Shoulder flash of the CSC
- Common name: Corrections Canada
- Abbreviation: CSC/SCC
- Motto: Futura Recipere (Latin for 'To grasp the future')

Agency overview
- Formed: December 21, 1978
- Preceding agencies: Canadian Penitentiary Service (CPS); National Parole Service
- Employees: 18,902 (2025)

Jurisdictional structure
- Operations jurisdiction: Canada
- Governing body: Public Safety Canada
- Constituting instrument: Corrections and Conditional Release Act

Operational structure
- Headquarters: Ottawa, Ontario
- Elected officer responsible: Gary Anandasangaree, Minister of Public Safety
- Agency executive: Talal Dakalbab, Commissioner
- Regions: 6: National Headquarters: Ottawa; Pacific Region: British Columbia & Yukon; Prairie Region: Alberta, Saskatchewan, Manitoba, Northwest Territories; Ontario Region: Greater Ontario and Nunavut; Quebec Region: Quebec; Atlantic Region: Prince Edward Island, New Brunswick, Nova Scotia, Newfoundland & Labrador

Website
- www.csc-scc.gc.ca

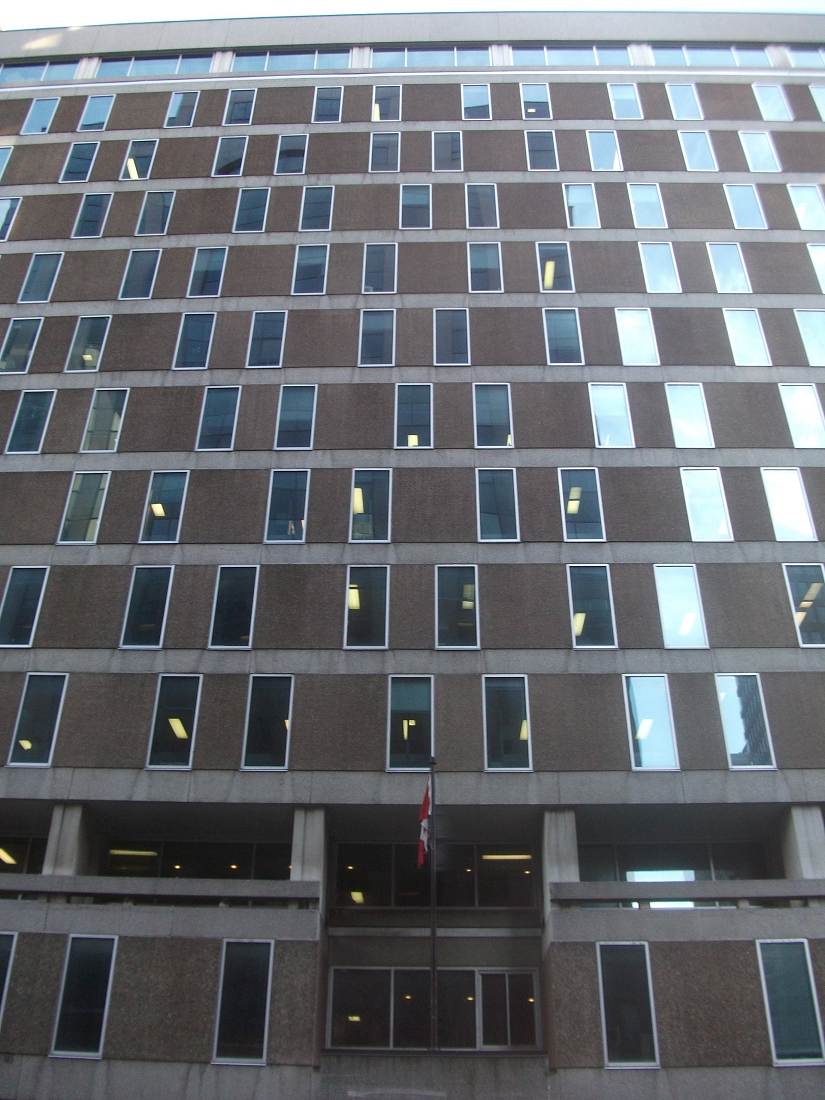
Head office of the Correctional Service of Canada in Ottawa

The Correctional Service Canada (CSC; French: Service correctionnel Canada), also known as Corrections Canada, is the Canadian federal government agency responsible for the incarceration and rehabilitation of convicted criminal offenders sentenced to two years or more. The agency has its headquarters in Ottawa, Ontario.

The CSC officially came into being on April 10, 1979, when Queen Elizabeth II signed authorization for the newly commissioned agency and presented it with its armorial bearings.

The Commissioner of the CSC is recommended for appointment by the Prime Minister and approved by an Order in Council. This appointed position reports directly to the Minister of Public Safety and Emergency Preparedness and is accountable to the public via Parliament.

== Insignia ==
In addition to using generic identifiers imposed by the Federal Identity Program, CSC is one of several federal agencies (primarily those involved with law enforcement, security, or having a regulatory function) that have been granted heraldic symbols. The badge (described below) was officially granted by the Canadian Heraldic Authority on October 15, 2009. The torch symbolizes learning, knowledge and hope, while the key represents the eventual unlocking of the door upon completion of a prison sentence. The motto means "to grasp the future". The CSC was granted a flag in 2009; it consists of the heraldic badge on a white field, with the Canadian flag in the canton. Senior officials have also been granted distinctive badges by the Canadian Heraldic Authority.

== History and development ==
=== Early years ===
Following the development of the penitentiary by the Philadelphia Quakers in the 1780s, the concept of penitence—isolation, work and religious contemplation—influenced the design and operation of prisons, not only in North America, but also in Europe, South America and Asia. The "Auburn system" developed at the Auburn Penitentiary in New York adopted the penitentiary sentence of the Philadelphia model, but added prisoners' labour, in the belief that work and training would assist in reforming criminals. The Kingston Penitentiary, based on the Auburn System, was built in 1835. Initially operated as a provincial jail, the penitentiary came under federal jurisdiction following the passage of the British North America Act in 1867.

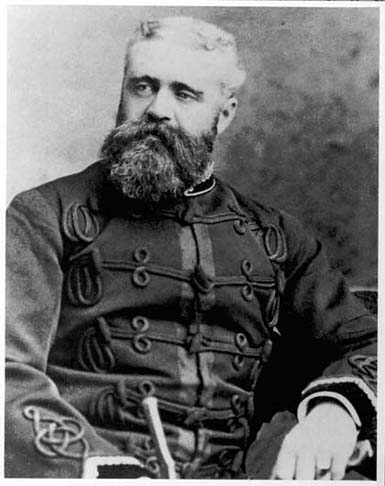
Warden Samuel L. Bedson, Manitoba Penitentiary (1880)

In 1868, the first Penitentiary Act brought prisons in Saint John, New Brunswick and Halifax, along with Kingston, under federal jurisdiction. Over the next twelve years, the federal government built Saint-Vincent-de-Paul Penitentiary in Saint-Vincent-de-Paul, Quebec (1873), Manitoba Penitentiary, in Stoney Mountain, Manitoba (1877), British Columbia Penitentiary, in New Westminster, British Columbia (1878) and Dorchester Penitentiary, in Dorchester, New Brunswick (1880). In 1906 the Alberta Penitentiary was opened in Edmonton, and the Saskatchewan Penitentiary was opened in Prince Albert in 1911. Buildings for these latter two facilities were constructed by forced labour performed by prisoners.

The regime of these prisons included productive labour during the day, solitary confinement during leisure hours and the rule of silence at all times. While there was no parole, prisoners with good conduct could have three days per month remitted from their sentence.

=== Reformation and rehabilitation ===
The Royal Commission to Investigate the Penal System of Canada (the Archambault Commission) was formed in response to a series of riots and strikes in the 1930s. The Archambault report, published in 1938, proposed sweeping changes for Canadian penitentiaries, with emphasis on crime prevention and the rehabilitation of prisoners. The Commission recommended a complete revision of penitentiary regulations to provide "strict but humane discipline and the reformation and rehabilitation of prisoners." While the commission's recommendations were not immediately implemented due to the advent of World War II, much of the report's philosophy remains influential.

After the Second World War, prison populations dropped, causing undercrowding and prison disturbances. This led to the creation of the Fauteaux Committee in 1953. The Committee saw prisons not merely as fulfilling a custodial role, but also to provide programs that would promote "worthwhile and creative activity" and address the basic behaviour, attitudes and patterns of inmates. This meant prisons had to change to support such programs and provide opportunities for vocational training, pre-release and after-care programs. The Fauteux Report recommended hiring more, and better-trained, personnel, including those with professional qualifications in social work, psychology, psychiatry, criminology and law. An important legacy of the Committee was the creation of the National Parole Board in 1959 and the development of a system of parole to replace the former ticket of leave system. While stating that parole was not to be a reduction, or undermining, of the sentence, the committee emphasized its strong support for parole:

Parole is a well-recognized procedure which is designed to be a logical step in the reformation and rehabilitation of a person who has been convicted of an offence and, as a result, is undergoing imprisonment... It is a transitional step between close confinement in an institution and absolute freedom in society (Fauteux 1956, 51).'"

The Penitentiary Act was amended in 1961 and a plan enacted to build ten new penitentiaries across Canada to implement the Fauteaux Committee's recommendations.

=== Commissioning of the CSC ===
In the 1970s, there was a movement to combine the then Penitentiary Service and the National Parole Service. This resulted in a Report to Parliament by the Sub-Committee on the Penitentiary System in Canada, chaired by Mark MacGuigan. The move toward consolidation was recognized by Commissioner Donald Yeomans, who referred to "... our efforts to come up with a title for our Service which will give us a proper identity and project the image of the merger of the Penitentiary Service and the National Parole Service." and announced that the name would be "The Correctional Service of Canada." (Yeomans, April 5, 1979). The Correctional Service of Canada was established in 1979, following the merger of the Canadian Penitentiary Service and the National Parole Service, in 1976.

Carl Lochnan, an expert in the field of Heraldry, who developed the Order of Canada, was contracted to develop the new Coat of Arms for the Commissioning of the Correctional Service of Canada. Lochnan filed a research document that stated in part the background philosophy on the given development:

In principle, there is no reason why the corporate graphic image of the [Correctional Service of Canada] should not take the familiar form of an institutional Coat-of-Arms, i.e. an heraldic shield emblazoned with appropriate symbolism … [c]ustom favors, instead, the adoption of a distinctive "service badge" analogous to those of the Canadian Armed Forces and of the RCMP … [t]he basic form of the suggested badge design is elliptical, containing "crossed keys" as a symbol of the Service and the stylized Maple Leaf from the Flag of Canada with the Royal Crown surmounted … [i]t is intended that the ova-shaped annulus should contain the official name of the Service in abbreviated form in English and French …[a]s a background to the oval badge … the sketches include what is known as a "glory" in the form of rays of light emanating symbolically from a star or the sun. The "glory" in the case of the hat badge … [is] an eight-pointed star … research has not revealed any image which would better symbolize the nature and purpose of the Corrections Service than the "crossed-keys" device … (Lochnan, 1978, July 21st).

On December 21, 1978, Commissioner Donald R. Yeomans approved the chosen design. In early 1979, the Coat-of-Arms was forwarded by Solicitor General Jean-Jacques Blais to the Governor General requesting the Queen's approval (Blais, March 29, 1979). On April 10, Queen Elizabeth II gave Royal Assent and authorization of the new Coat-of-Arms (Joly de Lotbiniere, April 20, 1979).

== List of commissioners ==
- Don Yeomans (1977–1985)
- Rhéal J. Leblanc (1985–1988)
- Ole Ingstrup (1988–1992)
- John Edwards (1993–1996)
- Ole Ingstrup (1996–2000)
- Lucie McClung (2000–2005)
- Keith Coulter (2005–2008)
- Don Head (2008–2018)
- Anne Kelly (2018–2026)
- Talal Dakalbab (2026–present)

== Legislative jurisdiction ==
The operation of the CSC is governed by federal statute under the Corrections and Conditional Release Act and Corrections and Conditional Release Regulations. In addition, the statute provides for discretion under the directive of the Commissioner. However, all Commissioner's Directives must remain within the parameters of the Charter of Rights and Freedoms and the Corrections and Conditional Release Act.

Correctional Service Canada only has jurisdiction over offenders in Canada for court-imposed sentences 24 months (two years) or greater.

== Court-imposed sentencing ==
There are two types of court-imposed sentences:

1. a determinate sentence;
2. an indeterminate sentence.

A determinate sentence is a sentence with a completion date (example five years, seven months), called a "Warrant Expiry". This date is court imposed, at which time Correctional Service Canada no longer has jurisdiction over the offender.

An indeterminate sentence is a sentence that is commonly referred to as a "life sentence". Correctional Service Canada has jurisdiction over the offender until the offender passes away. Although the court does impose a minimum number of years before the offender can apply to the Parole Board of Canada for conditional release. Thus, a court-imposed sentence of life with no parole for twenty-five years would indicate that the offender would be incarcerated for a minimum of twenty five years prior to consideration for a potential conditional release to the community, under the supervision of a community parole officer.

As of 2006 the incarceration rate in Canada was 107 per 100,000 people; one seventh that of the United States'.

== Security classification of offenders ==
There are three levels of security within Correctional Service Canada. They include maximum, medium, and minimum. Case management is completed by institutional parole officers (POs) within institutions, and by community parole officers in the community. The Parole Board of Canada has the complete responsibility in making liberty decisions at the point in the court-imposed sentence where an offender is allowed to live in the community on conditional release.

Once an offender is sentenced by a court to a sentence of two (2) years or more the offender comes under the jurisdiction of Correctional Service Canada. An institutional parole officer completes a comprehensive assessment of the offender's criminality and formulates an "offender security classification report" and a "correctional plan". It is this correctional plan that the offender will be assessed against for the entire court-imposed sentence.

Preparing offenders for their return to the community is an important focus for the Correctional Services of Canada. This preparation has become more difficult in recent years due to over crowding prisons and cutbacks in rehabilitative services of offenders. Parole officers who monitor these offenders are now stretched thin making these officers do more with less to work with. With this being such a big issue, the Correctional services of Canada developed the Integrated Police-Parole Initiative (IPPI). Also known as the Community Correctional Liaison Officer (CCLO) program. The IPPI received funding to begin operations in 16 locations across Canada in 2006-2007. This program places police officers in Correctional Services of Canada offices, where they support the activities of the parole staff. The officers specifically work with high-risk offenders in their transition to the community to try an increase public safety. High-risk, ex-prisoners face numerous challenges in re-entering their community, both personal and bureaucratic or legal. Many return to the neighborhood where they committed the crime, and deal with temptations of gang-life, criminal associates and substance abuse. With this, there should be no surprise that studies have shown that over two-thirds of offenders are rearrested within three years of release. These stats are what pushed the IPPI program to pay special attention to parolees with the highest level of risk; in the first months following release; and returning to locations with the highest levels of criminality. IPPI realized that there needed to be a different approach and make the parole officers more involved on a face-to-face basis which resulted in a more successful transition to the real world for ex-prisoners.

== Employees ==
Most personnel are plain clothed including, Parole Officers, Program Facilitators, Psychologists, Staff Training Officers, Assessment and Intervention Managers, Security Intelligence Officers, Assistant/Deputy Wardens, and the Institutional Head, called the "Warden". Each Region of Canada has a "Regional Deputy Commissioner" who reports directly to the Commissioner of Correctional Service Canada, who is based in the National Capital Region (Ottawa, Ontario).

Employees working at federal penitentiaries are designated as federal Peace Officers under Section 10 of the Corrections and Conditional Release Act.

=== Uniformed correctional officers ===
CSC ranks

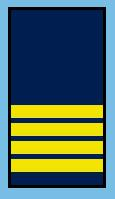
Correctional Manager

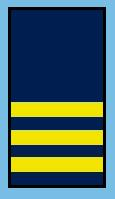
Staff Training Officer

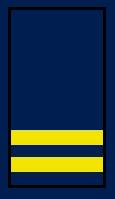
Correctional Officer II

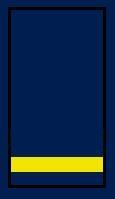
Correctional Officer

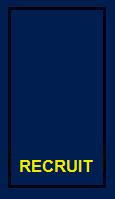
Officer Recruit

A Correctional Officer is an employee of the Public Service of Canada. All CSC Correctional Officers are uniformed and are designated as federal Peace Officers under Section 10 of the Corrections and Conditional Release Act.

The rank structure in CSC begins at entry as a Correctional Officer 1 (CX-01), also known as COI. These officers are responsible for security functions at the institution including patrols, security posts, first response, and escorts.

A Correctional Officer 2 (CX-02), or COII, is typically assigned to positions requiring a more experienced officer that works various posts including living units, communications, or visits. Correctional Officers who are specifically designated for Federally Sentenced Women (FSW) are called Primary Workers and have an entry rank of COII. A COII is not in any way a supervisory role to a COI, but are used to coordinate officers within their sector.

Once officers move into a supervisory role, which starts at Staff Training Officer (CX-03, formerly Correctional Supervisor), the uniform shirt colour is changed from navy blue to light blue.

The Correctional Manager (CX-04), or CM, is the Institutional Supervisor, and historically had been referred to as the "Keeper of the Keys", or in short the "Keeper".

All rank insignia is worn as shoulder epaulets attached to the shoulder straps of the uniform as either the word "RECRUIT" for officer recruits currently in training, or as 1, 2, 3, or 4 gold bars.

Within CSC, dress uniforms are available to staff member outside of the correctional officer ranks. Senior rank (worn as epaulets and typically only present on dress uniforms) are as follows:

- Commissioner: Crown, above a crossed key and torch, with four towers displayed below.
- Senior Deputy Commissioner: Crown, above a crossed key and torch, with three towers displayed below.
- Assistant Commissioner: Same as above, but with two towers.
- Regional Deputy Commissioner: Same as above, with one tower.

Uniformed Correctional Officers in the ranks of Correctional Officer 1, Correctional Officer 2, and Staff Training Officer are unionized and as such are members of the Union of Canadian Correctional Officers - Syndicat des Agents Correctionnels du Canada - Confédération des Syndicats Nationaux (UCCO-SACC-CSN).

Dress uniforms echo the same rank as displayed above. Each institution has a Ceremonial Unit that represent the Service at formal events across Canada and internationally. Examples of such events include local and ceremonial parades, funerals, recruit graduations, and national and international commemoration services.

The Ceremonial Unit consists of a Guard of Honour, the CSC Community Pipes and Drums Band and a Ceremonial Guard. Through their activities, the Unit is a public face for the Service's Correctional Officers, Parole Officers, and other staff.

Ceremonial rank structure is as follows, typically worn as epaulets on the dress uniform shirt and tunic.

- National Ceremonial Commander: Three stars (pips) centered with crossed key and torch.
- National Command Sergeant-Major: Rank positioned on the right sleeve depicting the Royal Crown above a crossed key and torch, and encircled by a laurel wreath. A crimson shoulder sash to be worn under the right shoulder strap of the tunic and across to the left hip.
- Regional Ceremonial Commander: Three pips.
- Regional Sergeant-Major: Rank positioned on the right sleeve depicting the Tudor Crown, a crossed key and torch, encircled by a laurel wreath. Crimson sash worn over the right shoulder and positioned under the right epaulet and right tunic lapel.
- Institutional Squad Leader: Two pips.
- Institutional Squad (2 i/c): One pip.

== CSC institutions ==
Alberta

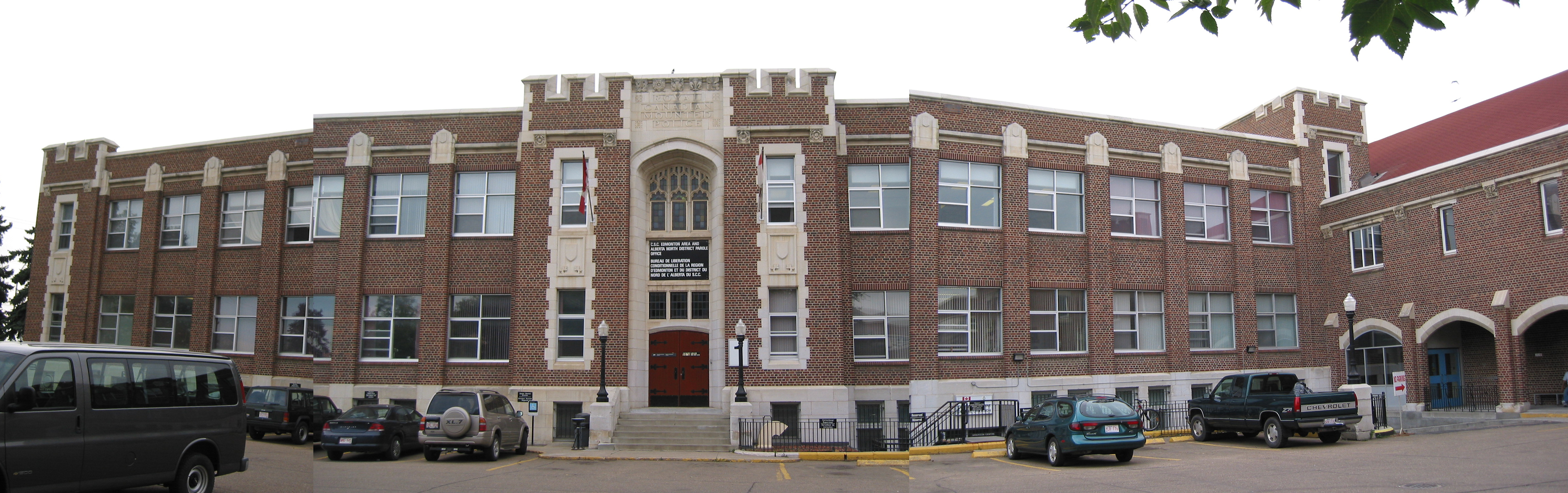
Grierson Centre, Edmonton, Alberta

- Bowden Institution
- Drumheller Institution
- Edmonton Institution
- Edmonton Institution for Women
- Grande Cache Institution
- Grierson Centre
- Pê Sâkâstêw

British Columbia

- Fraser Valley Institution for Women
- Ferndale Institution
- Kent Institution
- Kwìkwèxwelhp Healing Lodge
- Matsqui Institution
- Mission Institution
- Mountain Institution
- Pacific Institution/Regional Treatment Center/Regional Reception and Assessment Center (RRAC)
- William Head Institution

Manitoba

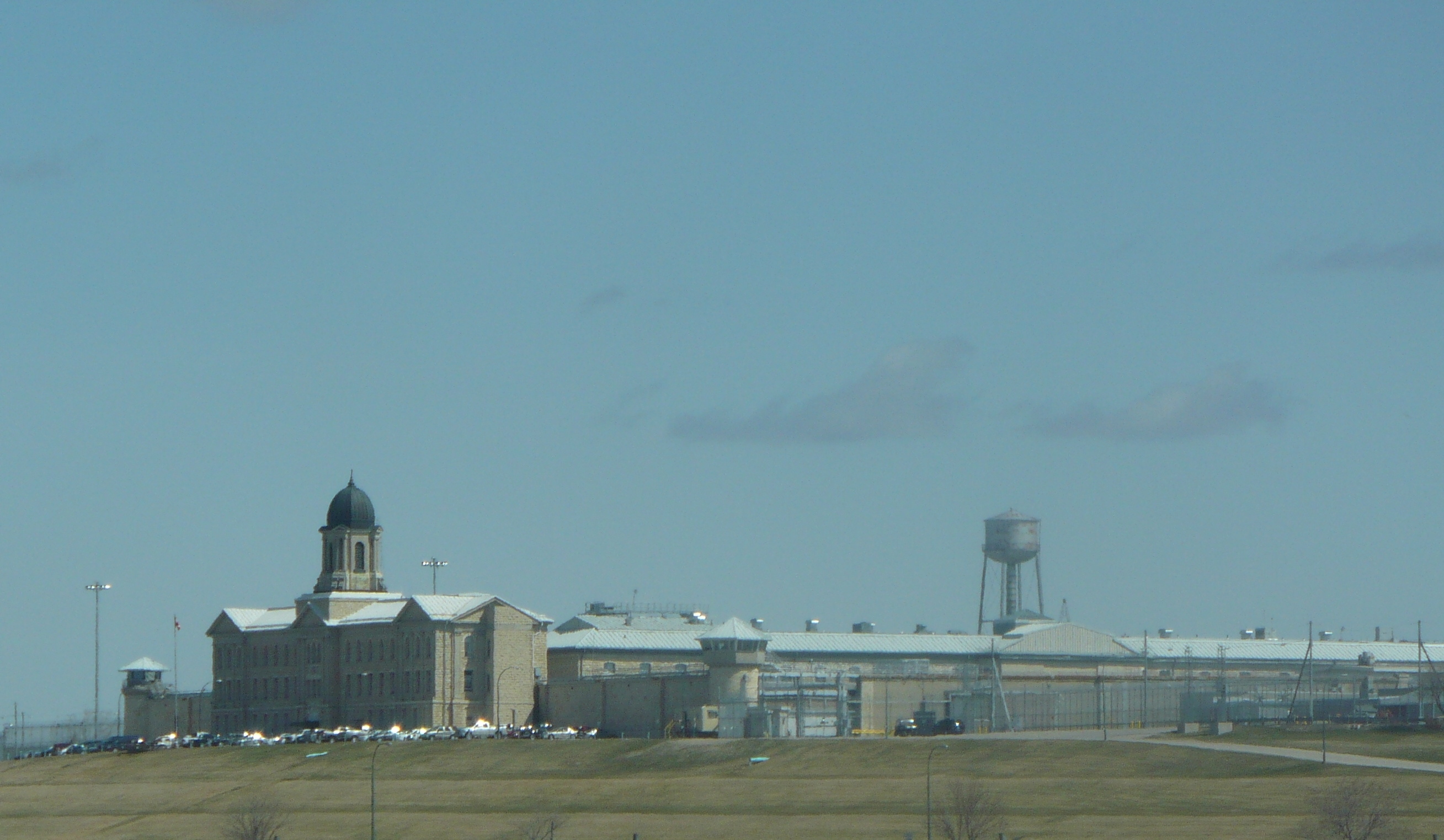
Stony Mountain, Manitoba

- Rockwood Institution
- Stony Mountain Institution

New Brunswick

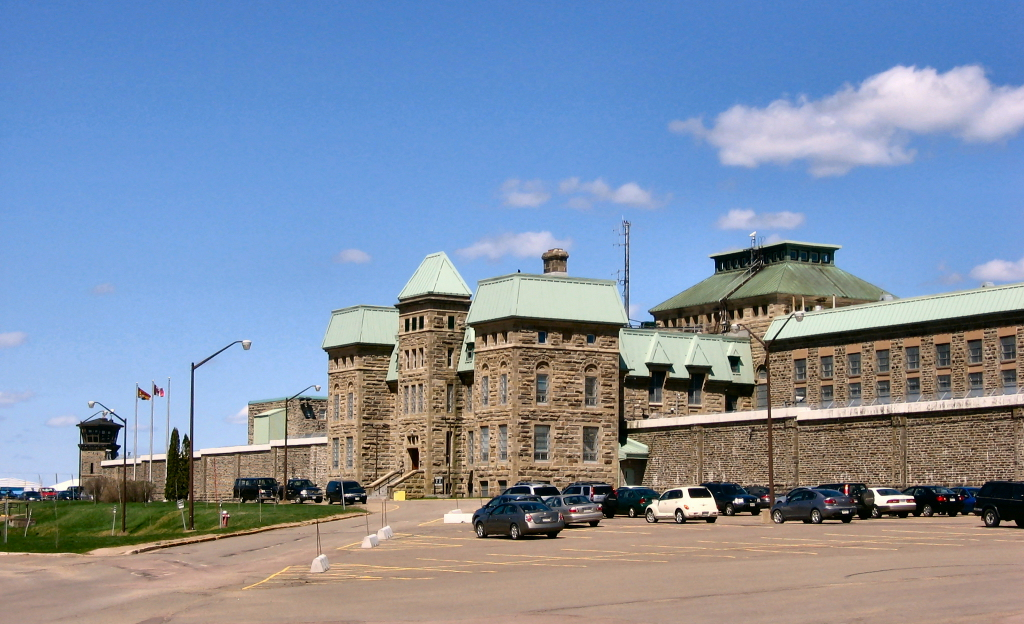
Dorchester Penitentiary in New Brunswick

- Atlantic Institution
- Dorchester Penitentiary
- Westmorland Institution

Nova Scotia

- Nova Institution for Women
- Springhill Institution

Ontario

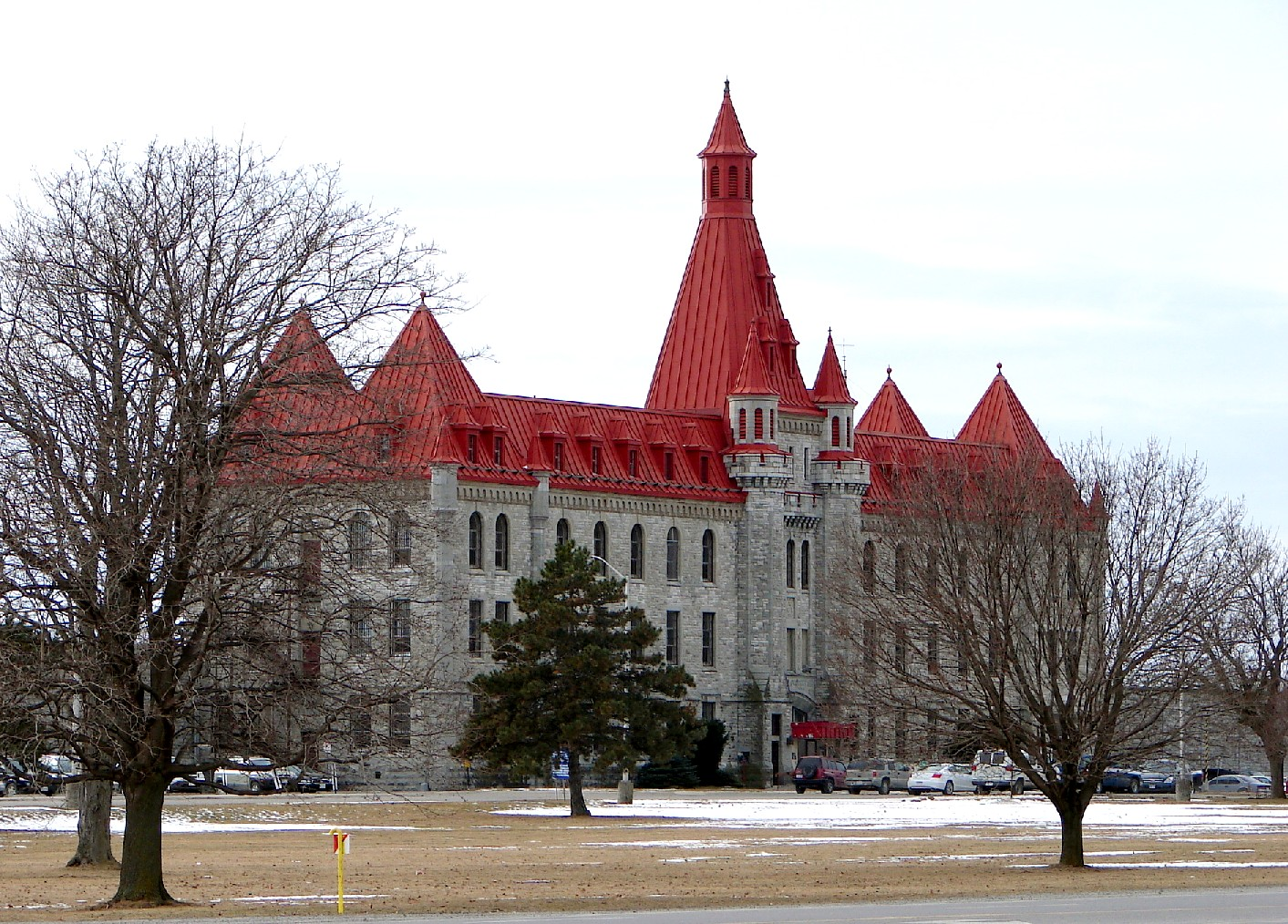
Collins Bay Institution

- Bath Institution
- Beaver Creek Institution
- Fenbrook Institution (Amalgamated with Beaver Creek Institution on 1 April 2014)
- Collins Bay Institution
- Frontenac Institution (situated behind Collins Bay Institution, in Kingston)
- Joyceville Institution, in Kingston
- Pittsburgh Institution, in Kingston
- Grand Valley Institution for Women
- Kingston Penitentiary (closed 2013)
- Millhaven Institution
- Regional Treatment Centre (closed 2013)
- Warkworth Institution

Quebec

- Archambault Institution
- Cowansville Institution
- Donnacona Institution
- Drummond Institution
- Federal Training Centre and Montée St.-François Institution in Laval
- La Macaza Institution
- Joliette Institution for Women
- Leclerc Institution (closed 2013)
- Port-Cartier Institution
- Regional Reception Centre
- Sainte-Anne-des-Plaines Institution

Saskatchewan

- Okimaw Ohci Healing Lodge
- Regional Psychiatric Centre
- Riverbend Institution
- Saskatchewan Federal Penitentiary

Among the institutions are "healing lodges" for Aboriginal offenders.

== Prison labour and employment programs ==
In its early years, the Canadian penitentiary system used prison labour as a form of punishment that doubled as an essential element to the operation of the penitentiary itself. Furthermore, the prison industry was seen as punishment "meant to reform the misguided." Nearly a hundred years later, the industry was deemed as an key component in the "rehabilitative process," a value which was progressively gaining importance for CSC. By the 1950s the focus on prison labour shifted away from its role as a form of punishment and transitioned towards this being an integral part of offenders' rehabilitation, and thus increases public safety.

In 1980, CSC launched CORCAN, an employment program for prisoners designed to rehabilitate inmates by offering them work skills that they can use to find employment after they are released, thus decreasing their likelihood of recidivism. CORCAN operates through partnerships with public, private and non-profit firms, which provide work to inmates in industries such as manufacturing, textiles, construction and services for which they are remunerated.

In 2013, the Harper government implemented a series of room and board fees amounting to a 30% cut in pay for inmates enrolled in the CORCAN program.

The CORCAN program has been criticized for offering few meaningful work and training opportunities, as many of the jobs available to inmates are in industries with little relevance to current labour market needs, such as laundry, textiles and manufacturing. This is particularly true of women prisoners, who are given gendered work that gives them few marketable skills in the labour market once released. Many Black prisoners have reported experiencing discrimination during the employment process for CORCAN jobs, and Black prisoners are more likely to receive lower pay for the work they perform.

In March 2026, Correctional service Canada planned to cut library technicians and employment co-ordinator positions in federal penitentiaries. The federal department revealed plans to increase online resources for inmates instead.

== Citizens' Advisory Committees ==
Under section 7 of the Corrections and Conditional Release Regulations and further by Commissioner's Directives CD 023, each institution and parole office must establish a Citizens' Advisory Committee (CAC) who are mandated to "contribute to the public safety by actively interacting with staff of the Correctional Service of Canada, the public and offenders, providing impartial advice and recommendations, thereby contributing to the quality of the correctional process."

Each institution and parole office forms the 'local committee' for which the CSC consult with on matters regarding correctional operations, programs, policies, and plans. They in turn participate in the regional committee (Atlantic, Quebec, Ontario, Prairies and Pacific) to coordinate initiatives for the region. Finally, the National Executive Committee is made up of the five CAC Regional Chairpersons as well as by the National Chairperson, who are responsible for liaison between the committees and the CSC HQ, monitor and review all policies or actions of the CSC at the local, regional and national levels and adopt cohesive strategy for all committees.

All CAC members have, by law, the authority to have reasonable access to every part of the institution or parole office they are attached to, talk with all the staff and offenders or parolee within the organization and access to hearings (if the offender consents). These authorities are given to members once they have their applications approved and security clearances approved by CSC National Headquarters.

== See also ==
- List of youth detention incidents in Canada
- Provincial correctional services in Canada
- Federal Bureau of Prisons
