= Samuel Lawrence Bedson =

- Born: February 3, 1842
- Died: June 17, 1891 (aged 49)
- Military career
- Allegiance: British
- Rank: Quartermaster Sergeant
- Unit: Bedfordshire and Hertfordshire Regiment
- Other work: Warden, Manitoba Federal Penitentiary Stony Mountain

Samuel Lawrence Bedson (February 3, 1842 – July 17, 1891) was a British-born military man and later prison warden who spent much of his life in Canada.

Bedson came to Canada East with the 16th Regiment of Foot in 1861 as a private and stayed on, joining the 2nd Quebec Rifles in 1870. With the rank of quartermaster sergeant, he travelled west with the Wolseley Expedition in response to the Red River Rebellion at the Red River Colony in present-day Manitoba.

In 1871, the Lower Fort Garry based regiment was disbanded and Bedson became warden of the provincial jail established in the old barracks. In 1874, the provincial jail moved to Winnipeg and the first federal penitentiary in Manitoba operated at the fort with Bedson as warden. He also held this position at the new federal facility in Stony Mountain, opened in 1877.

Bedson's career in the prison system was interrupted in March 1885 by the North-West Rebellion. He was named chief transport officer by Major-General Frederick Dobson Middleton. Although this was officially a non-combatant role, Bedson was involved in scouting activities.
