= Arbour Report =

Canadian inquiry into prisoners' rights

Commission of Inquiry into Certain Events at the Prison for Women in Kingston
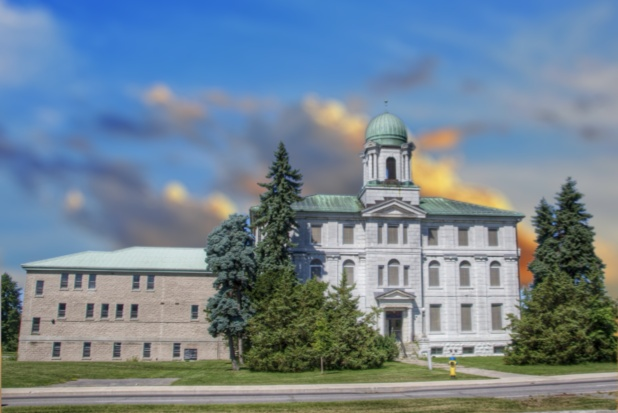
- Kingston; former prison for women
- Also known as: Arbour Report
- Commissioner: Louise Arbour
- Inquiry period: April 10, 1995 – 1996
- Authorized: Order in Council P.C. 1995-608

The Commission of Inquiry into Certain Events at the Prison for Women in Kingston was a Canadian inquiry headed by Justice Louise Arbour concerned with prisoners' rights and the treatment of federally-incarcerated women. The Commission's final report was released in 1996, and was dubbed the Arbour Report.

Originally formed to investigate a disturbance and subsequent mistreatment of prisoners at the Prison for Women (P4W) in Kingston, Ontario, the inquiry became more broad, encompassing the administration of sentences and conditions of confinement of federally-incarcerated women in Canada as a whole. The inquiry was ordered in April 1995 after Solicitor General Herb Gray viewed a recording of an all-male emergency response team conducting strip searches of women prisoners.

The 300-page report was submitted to Solicitor General Herb Gray on 31 March 1996. Since the report found that many of the policy issues were systemic and predated 1994, it also made broad structural and policy recommendations. Ultimately, the Arbour Report contributed to numerous changes in how prisoners, especially women, were treated in federal Canadian prisons.

P4W was closed in 2000 after the opening of regional prisons for women across Canada.

== Background ==
=== Early reform ===
Significant change was already underway in women's corrections prior to 1996 with the construction and opening of regional institutions for women offenders across Canada. Years earlier, in 1989, Correctional Service Canada (CSC) established a Task Force on Federally Sentenced Women to develop a comprehensive strategy for the management of women offenders. This Task Force was co-chaired by both CSC and the Canadian Association of Elizabeth Fry Societies, and included representation from government, correctional practitioners, community advocates, Indigenous organizations, and women offenders. In 1990, the Task Force released a report of its own, called "Creating Choices", which recommended the closure of Prison for Women and implementation of new regional institutions.

Nova Institution for Women, Okimaw Ohci Healing Lodge, and Edmonton Institution for Women all began operations in 1995, six months prior to the release of the Arbour Report. Joliette Institution and Grand Valley Institution for Women opened in 1997.

=== Events at the Prison for Women ===
On 22 April 1994, there was a violent confrontation between prisoners and staff that resulted in 6 inmates being taken to segregation on criminal charges. The riot was allegedly sparked by a racial remark from an officer to an Indigenous prisoner. The Arbour Report was unable to substantiate the claims but concluded that racial slurs were found to be congruent with the prison environment at the time.

Between April 22 and 26, conditions in segregation were tense and deteriorating. Staff held demonstrations outside of the prison to demand transfer of the women involved in the disturbance. One woman in segregation attempted suicide and another took hostages; neither of these women were among the original 6 inmates involved. The segregation unit was generally disruptive. While news reports at the time focus on the women's behaviour in segregation, the Arbour Report found that officers' poor treatment of the women played a significant role in escalating the tension. The Arbour Report does not explicitly mention how many of the women involved in these incidents were Indigenous; however, at least three of the women were members of the Native Sisterhood, a prisoner-led Indigenous support group inside P4W.

On 26 April 1994, an all-male emergency response team from neighbouring Kingston Penitentiary centered the segregation unit of P4W in order to complete cell extractions and strip searches of 8 women, 6 of whom were involved in the initial incident. The report found that the women were left shackled in bare cells for hours. The next day, April 27, the women were asked to consent to cavity searches in exchange for cigarettes and showers. On May 6, five of the women were transferred to a male psychiatric facility inside Kingston Penitentiary, where they lived in segregation side-by-side with male inmates for up to 2 months. The women were also denied access to lawyers, outside exercise, and were not allowed to shower for days at a time.

They were released from segregation between 7 December 1994 and 19 January 1995, eight to nine months after initially being segregated. Psychological reports record the women's deteriorating mental health, often to the point of crisis.

=== Aftermath of events ===
Prior to the creation of the special Commission of Inquiry into the incident, Correctional Service Canada (CSC) conducted its own investigation into the events, finding no fault with the actions of the P4W warden and officers. The Office of the Correctional Investigator also conducted an investigation, which raised questions about the way the incident and subsequent investigation was managed.

After viewing a recording of the strip search, Solicitor General Herb Gray ordered a Commission of Inquiry, and Justice Louise Arbour was appointed head of the Commission. The video was eventually released to CBC and parts of it aired on the Fifth Estate documentary on the incident titled "The Ultimate Response".

== The report ==
The process of inquiry included fact-finding, interviews and investigations, formal hearings, and policy consultations. The inquiry employed a combination of formal judicial hearings and roundtable discussions. The prisoner-led support group Native Sisterhood was granted status and funding to attend policy discussions. The inquiry was unique because they were tasked with not only investigating the specific incident described above, but also with Correctional Service Canada's response to the incident.

The 300-page report was submitted to Solicitor General Herb Gray on 31 March 1996. Written in 4 parts, the report first outlines the events that triggered the inquiry. Second, policy issues pertaining to prisoner rights, institutional accountability, and women's issues are addressed. The third section takes a historical perspective on the April events specifically and P4W generally, connecting to earlier reports that also criticized the treatment of federally-sentenced women in Canada. Finally, the fourth section summarized the numerous recommendations scattered throughout the first 3 parts.

The Arbour Report contained 14 main recommendations with over 100 sub-recommendations that focused primarily on women's corrections but had broad policy and management implications throughout CSC.

In the preamble of the Arbour Report, it is noted that corrections is the hidden branch of the criminal justice system, and that the lack of visibility to the public results in a lack of accountability and subsequent shortcomings. The Arbour Report and the events surrounding the investigation received a lot of media attention; the public was exposed to hidden elements of corrections, especially the lived realities of federally sentenced women. The opening statement of the report's preface is: "The history of women and crime is spotted with opportunities most of which have been missed. We hope that history will not dictate our future."

=== Part 1 – The Events at the Prison for Women ===
This section resulted from the formal hearings and provided an overview of the prison context at the time, the main incident, and aftermath.

The context of P4W is outlined by an organizational chart of prison administration and a description of the daily regime for prisoners. The report provides a brief explanation of the work of the Correctional Investigator, the independent ombudsperson who investigates prisoner-reported problems. The official climate of P4W and federally sentenced women was one of change and movement: recommendations of the 1990 report, Creating Choices, were being implemented. Creating Choices called for new principles to dominate women's corrections: "empowerment, meaningful and responsible choices, respect and dignity, a supportive environment, and shared responsibilities".

Generally, it was found that the spirit of Creating Choices was incongruent with the events beginning April 22, 1994. "Nearly every step that was taken in response to this incident was at odds with the intent of the new initiatives." The prison staff, administrators, and CSC officials often did not follow policy, procedure, or legal mandates in their dealings in the prison. In this section, the Arbour Report quotes policy and law (Corrections and Conditional Release Act, Commissioners Directives, and Standing Orders of the prison), and juxtaposes actual events to discover whether or not policy was being followed. In most cases, policies were not being followed, or not being followed in their entirety.

=== Part 2 – Policy Issues ===
The report focused on two main policy issues. General correctional issues such as developing a culture of rights, managing segregation and increasing accountability were the first issue. Second, the Arbour Report shed a spotlight on women's issues in prison. Women were routinely placed in higher-security housing units than their true security level. Since women often had histories of trauma and abuse, the practice of cross-gender staffing was raised as potentially inappropriate and re-traumatizing. Referring to a survey of federally sentenced women, the report notes they were mothers (70%), experienced sexual abuse (53%, 61% of Indigenous women), experienced physical abuse (68%, 90% of Indigenous women), lacked job training and steady employment (more than 66% for both). Federally sentenced women pose less risk for reoffending than federally sentenced men. When convicted of violent offenses, women are more likely to know their victims as friends, relatives, or romantic partners.

Overrepresentation of Indigenous women in federal prison was also discussed. At the time of the report, Indigenous women represented 13% of all federally sentenced women in Canada. They are more likely to serve their sentences in prison than in the community. In the prairies, 50% of all federally sentenced women in prison were Indigenous. These numbers continue to rise. The Arbour Report explains that federally sentenced Indigenous women have a different profile than non-Indigenous women: they are "distinct culturally, linguistically, and socially," have different offending histories, and have different personal and social experiences. The report highlights a need to respond differently to Indigenous federally sentenced women. Reform is recommended in the form of a Healing Lodge for women, an alternative custodial setting for Indigenous women of all security statuses. This section also drew on the recommendations from an earlier report, Creating Choices, further amplifying the need for real change in women's corrections.

=== Part 3 – The Roots of Change: An historical perspective ===
This section situated the events at P4W against a historical backdrop, including the entire history of women's corrections in Canada. An overarching theme in this section was that P4W was criticized from its beginning. Calls for its closure began only four years after P4W opened, in the Archambeault Commission in 1938. Fourteen subsequent reports, from 1947–1990, have identified inadequate treatment of women prisoners.

Reference was made to the cultural insensitivity of the prison, over-classification of women prisoners to higher security levels, and the harms done by centralizing federally sentenced women in Kingston, moving them far away from their families.

=== Part 4 – Summary of Recommendations ===
Ultimately, the Arbour Report made over 100 recommendations. In an interview after releasing the report, Arbour said, "the failings I have identified are systemic."

The major recommendations included:

1. Compensate the women who were involved in the April 26 strip search and subsequent segregation.
2. Appoint a Deputy Commissioner of Women.
3. Draft protocols for cross-gender staffing, including having one institution staffed with no men on living units.
4. Changes to use of force and use of emergency response team protocol, including not to use male teams against women, provide legal counsel before consenting to a cavity search, and that cavity searches can only be done in appropriate medical environments by female physicians.
5. Permit all Indigenous women, regardless of security classification, to access the Healing Lodge. For women who are not incarcerated at the Healing Lodge, that they be provided with access to Elders, Indigenous staff, and culturally relevant programs.
6. To reduce sentences or give early release in situations where the experience of imprisonment was seen as being more punitive than intended by the courts.
7. Restrict the use of segregation to 30 days at a time (60 non-consecutive days per year) and implement stronger oversight in segregation.
8. Changes to investigation boards and their oversight.
9. Increased accountability in the grievance/complaint process.
10. Partnership with others in the criminal justice system, such as lawyers and police, and judges to assist with staff training, oversight, and to ensure prisoner rights are not violated.
11. A variety of recommendations specific to the events in April, including the use of mace, treatment of the emergency response videos, and streamlining of administrative orders.

== Aftermath of report ==
Following the report, Solicitor General Herb Gray formed a committee to advise him on the implementation of the report's recommendations within six weeks. Gray also offered a "heartfelt apology" to the six inmates and said that the government is considering financial compensation for the women.

=== Response of Correctional Services Canada ===
The day before the Arbour Report was released, Correctional Services Canada Commissioner John Edwards (who has headed the federal prison system since 1989) acknowledged that there were systemic problems in the organization, saying "we - at all levels - do seem to make too many errors of omission and commission." One day after the release of the Arbour Report, he resigned.

Immediately following the report, CSC made changes. A Deputy Commissioner of Women Offenders position was created and plans were made to pilot a prison that had only women as front-line staff. All new regional women's prisons planned to use either an all-female riot squad or police assistance to restore order.

In 1998, six of the women who were strip searched won a civil lawsuit against CSC, angering some officers and staff.

P4W was closed in 2000, after the opening of several regional prisons for women.

A Ten Year Status Report written by CSC outlines important changes that were a result of the Arbour Report, including increased human rights training, grievance manuals, new regional women's prisons, cross-gender staffing principles, and culturally-appropriate programming for Indigenous women. The update is thorough, touching on nearly all recommendations from the Arbour Report.

=== Impact on the practice of imprisonment in Canada ===
CSC has been criticized about the lack of follow through with the Arbour Report recommendations. Women continue to be housed at higher security levels, classification tools discriminate on race, class, gender, sexual orientation, and mental health. In 1996, women in maximum security were isolated in men's prisons. New regional prisons emphasized security: walls, cameras, and fences eliminated minimum security housing. Kim Pate described the implementation of Arbour Report recommendations to be "extremely selective and somewhat self-serving."

One of the Arbour Report's criticisms of CSC was the ongoing use of segregation (recommendation 7 above). Ultimately recommending a maximum of 30 consecutive days in segregation (60 total days per year), Louis Arbour eventually called for a total end to segregation. From 2001–2011, CSC implemented a practice for the segregation of women called the Management Protocol. Although claiming to follow processes outlined in the Corrections and Conditional Release Act, the Protocol imposed strict and indeterminant segregation on women, most of whom were Indigenous. Management Protocol ended when a lawsuit was launched against the practice. CSC did not made any significant policy changes to either disciplinary or administrative segregation until forced to do so by the British Columbia and Ontario Supreme Courts. In 2019, Structured Intervention Units were created to replace segregation and to provide prisoners with more access to support. However, these units and their operation remain under scrutiny and criticism.

The Arbour Report also recommended that prisoners have redress when their incarceration inflicts a punishment that is more severe than originally intended (recommendation 6 above). Tom Engel, a Canadian lawyer, has pointed to this recommendation as an opportunity to argue for sentencing adjustments when prisoners are segregated unfairly or unable to access healthcare or rehabilitation services.

In October 2000, Prison for Women closed its doors as part of a larger restructuring that began in 1990, with the opening of regional prisons for women across Canada.

Since the release of the Arbour Report, there have been additional major reviews on federal correctional services for women:

- The Cross-Gender Monitoring Project — First Annual Report (1998), Second Annual Report (1999), and Third and Final Report (2000/2001)
- Auditor General Report on the Reintegration of Women Offenders (April 2003)
- 26th Report of the Standing Committee on Public Accounts (November 2003)
- Canadian Human Rights Commission (CHRC), Protecting Their Rights – A Systemic Review of Human Rights in Correctional Services for Federally Sentenced Women (December 2003)

== The Strong Women's Song ==
The Strong Women's Song is an Indigenous Honour Song that is associated with federally-sentenced women in Canada. One of the stories associated with the song is that the women started singing the song during the altercation on 22 April 1994, further antagonizing the officers. Neither the song nor this aspect of the incident were mentioned in the Arbour Report. The song has been recorded and shared online in Anishinaabe and Cree. The Strong Women's Song has its roots in P4W in the 1970s, and continues to be sung at women's prisons throughout Canada.

== See also ==
- Louise Arbour
- Healing Lodge
- Correctional Service Canada
- Archambeault Commission
- Kingston Penitentiary
- Prison for Women (Kingston, Ontario)
- Kim Pate
- P4W: Prison for Women
