= Governor General's Foot Guards =

Infantry regiment in the Canadian Army Primary Reserve based in Ottawa

Coordinates: 45.4214°N 75.6888°W

- Badge of the regiment
- Active: 1872–present
- Country: Canada
- Branch: Canadian Army
- Type: Foot guards
- Role: Light infantry
- Size: Battalion
- Part of: 33 Canadian Brigade Group
- Garrison/HQ: Cartier Square Drill Hall; Ottawa, Ontario
- Nicknames: "The Feet"; "GGFGs"; "The Sharpshooters" (historic); "Gustav's Gone for Good"; "The Guards"
- Mottos: Civitas et princeps cura nostra (Latin for 'Our country and ruler are our concern'); Up the Guards! (unofficial)
- March: Quick: "Milanollo"; Slow: "Figaro" ("Non più andrai" from The Marriage of Figaro)
- Anniversaries: Regimental birthday – June 7, 1872; Battle of Cut Knife Hill – May 2, 1885 (first casualties)
- Engagements: North-West Rebellion; Second Boer War; First World War; Second World War; War in Afghanistan
- Battle honours: See list
- Website: Official website

Commanders
- Colonel of the Regiment: Louise Arbour (ex officio as Governor General)
- Lieutenant Colonel Commanding: LCol Brian Wright, CD, AdeC
- Regimental Sergeant Major: MWO Dominique Kowlessar, CD

Insignia
- Plume: Red (right side of bearskin cap)
- Headdress: Khaki beret
- Abbreviation: GGFG

The Governor General's Foot Guards (GGFG) is the senior reserve infantry regiment in the Canadian Army. Located in Ottawa at the Cartier Square Drill Hall, the regiment is a Primary Reserve infantry unit, and the members are part-time soldiers. They train part-time and full-time for domestic operations and international missions. This involves training for domestic operations where the unit deployed members to help during a natural disaster or public emergency.

The regiment originated in Ottawa, Ontario, on 7 June 1872 as the 1st Battalion Governor General's Foot Guards. Emergency deployments included the 1998 Ice Storm, flooding in 2017 and 2019, and during the COVID-19 pandemic in 2020. It also involves training for international operations and support to the Regular Force on operations in countries such as Afghanistan, Sudan, Iraq, Jordan, Egypt, Latvia, and Ukraine where troops from the regiment have deployed in recent years.

Members of the GGFG train part time between September and June, usually Tuesday evenings and one weekend a month. Between May and August, members can be employed full time in a variety of roles such as students or instructors on training courses, taking part in tasks such as the Ceremonial Guard, and attending field exercises.

The regiment also runs supplementary training programs such as the marksmanship program to improve shooting skills, and the leadership development training program to prepare soldiers to attend leadership courses. Additionally the regiment runs sports and fitness programs. The GGFG are also affiliated with 1st Battalion, The Royal Canadian Regiment (1 RCR) for reserve integration training.

The GGFG perpetuate the 2nd Canadian Battalion (Eastern Ontario Regiment), CEF, and 77th Battalion (Ottawa), CEF, from the First World War.

== Regimental structure ==
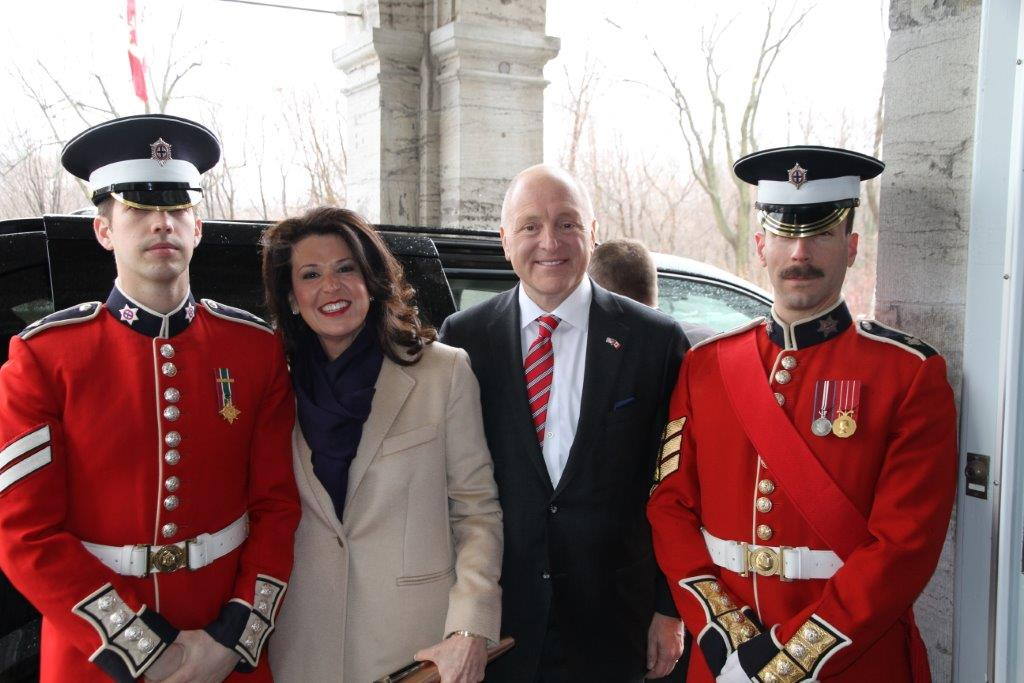
Members wearing undress forage caps with full-dress tunics

The regiment is composed of the following sub-units:

- Regimental Headquarters – Regimental Headquarters is responsible for the overall command, control, and administration of all members of the regiment.
- No. 1 Company (Rifle Company) – The rifle company conducts collective field training exercises to train soldiers to work together as a team across a range of tactical scenarios. Most of the trained soldiers in the regiment are part of the rifle company.
- No. 2 Company (Training Company) – The training company runs individual training courses so members can become qualified or complete specialized courses. It is composed of instructors and students taking part in individual training courses. New members of the regiment are members of the training company until they are fully trained.
- No. 3 Company (Combat Service Support) – The support company provides logistical support to the training being conducted by Nos. 1 and 2 Companies.
- GGFG Band – The regimental band is a brass-and-reed band that represents the regiment at performances around the city and beyond.
- Public Duties Company – Public Duties Company (PD Coy) plans and conducts the Ceremonial Guard during the summer months as well as supporting the governor general of Canada and Rideau Hall with ceremonial tasks throughout the year.

The regiment also supports the 2784 GGFG Army Cadets of the Royal Canadian Army Cadets.

== Lineage ==
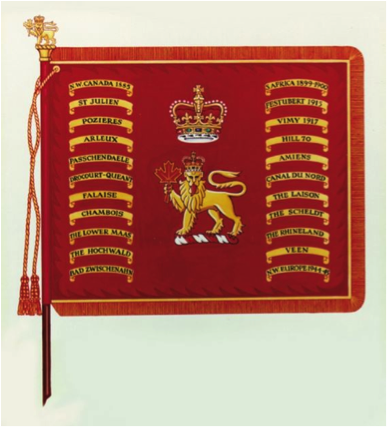
King's colour

Regimental colour

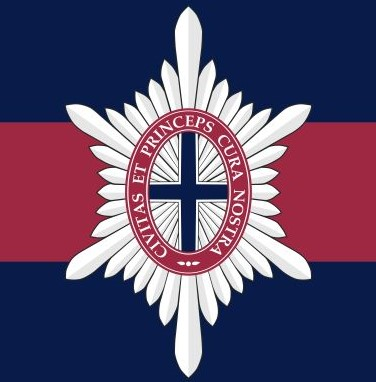
Camp flag

The GGFG originated in Ottawa on 7 June 1872 as the 1st Battalion Governor General's Foot Guards. It was redesignated as the Governor General's Foot Guards on 16 September 1887; as The Governor General's Foot Guards on 1 April 1896; as the 2nd (Reserve) Battalion, The Governor General's Foot Guards on 7 November 1941; as The Governor General's Foot Guards on 31 January 1946; as The Governor General's Foot Guards (5th Battalion, The Canadian Guards) on 1 September 1954; as the Governor General's Foot Guards (5th Battalion, The Canadian Guards) on 25 April 1958; and finally returned to the name Governor General's Foot Guards on 1 September 1976.

In the Canadian Forces, units may make formal, official links between each other called affiliations. These affiliations are "to foster continuous fraternal connections between military organizations beyond the close, professional relationships which are always encouraged." The GGFG were affiliated with the Canadian Guards, and from 1954 to 1976 they used a Canadian Guards battalion number in token of the affiliation. Despite the battalion number, the GGFG were considered a separate regiment from the Canadian Guards. The affiliation automatically ceased when the Canadian Guards were put on the Supplementary Order of Battle in 1970.

Lineage chart

1869	Independent rifle coys
1872	1st Bn Governor General's Foot Guards
1877	Governor General's Foot Guards
1885	Active service (Note: 1 company, April–July)
1896	The Governor General's Foot Guards
1914	2nd Bn, CEF
1915	77th "Overseas" Bn', CEF
1916	Absorbed by 47th and 73rd "Overseas" Bn
1920	Disbanded	1st Bn, The Governor General's Foot Guards	2nd Bn (77th Bn, CEF), (Note: Reserve) The Governor General's Foot Guards
1931	1st Bn (2nd Bn, CEF), The Governor General's Foot Guards
1936	The Governor General's Foot Guards	Disbanded
1940	The Governor General's Foot Guards, CASF
1940	1st Bn, The Governor General's Foot Guards, CASF
1941	2nd (Reserve) Bn, The Governor General's Foot Guards
1942	21st Armd Regt (The Governor General's Foot Guards), CAC, CASF
1945	21st Armd Regt (The Governor General's Foot Guards), RCAC, CASF
1946	Disbanded	The Governor General's Foot Guards
1954	The Governor General's Foot Guards (5th Bn, The Canadian Guards)
1958	Governor General's Foot Guards (5th Bn, The Canadian Guards)
1976	Governor General's Foot Guards

== Operational history ==
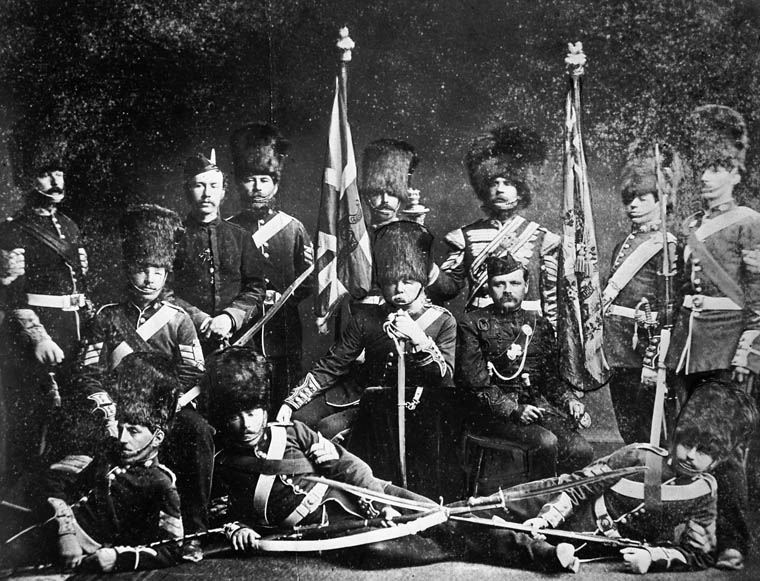
GGFG, 1875

Members of the regiment took part in the Nile Expedition of 1884 and the following year provided a company of sharpshooters to the Battleford column during the North-West Rebellion, where the regiment suffered its first two casualties at the Battle of Cut Knife Hill. The company was removed from active service on 24 July 1885.

During the Second Boer War the regiment contributed volunteers for the various Canadian contingents, mainly the 2nd (Special Service) Battalion, Royal Canadian Regiment of Infantry.

=== Great War ===
Distinguishing patch of the 2nd Battalion, CEF

The GGFG perpetuates two battalions of the Canadian Expeditionary Force who took part in the First World War.

The 2nd Battalion (Eastern Ontario Regiment), CEF "The Iron Second", which was a part of the 1st Infantry Brigade, 1st Canadian Division, and saw continuous service on the Western front from 1915 to end of war in 1918. The 2nd Battalion also fought at the battles of Ypres, St. Julien, Festubert, Pozières, Vimy (1917), Arleux, Hill 70, Passchendaele, Amiens, and Canal du Nord, to name only a few. By the end of the war, 242 officers and 5,084 other ranks had fought with the battalion. Of those, 52 officers and 1,227 other ranks were killed.

The 77th Battalion (Ottawa), CEF was authorized on 10 July 1915 and embarked for Great Britain on 19 June 1916. It provided reinforcements for the Canadian Corps in the field until 22 September 1916, when its personnel were absorbed by the 47th Battalion (British Columbia), CEF, and 73rd Battalion (Royal Highlanders of Canada), CEF, and the battalion was disbanded.

The honours and traditions of these battalions are perpetuated by the GGFG.

=== Second World War ===
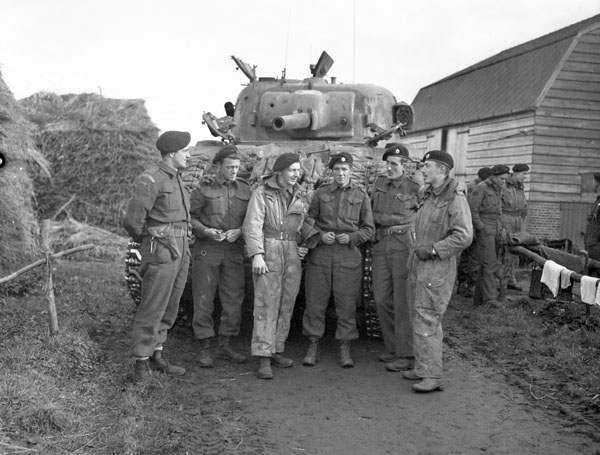
Personnel from the GGFG with a Sherman tank, 1944

During the Second World War the GGFG was mobilized in May 1940. In 1942 the regiment was re-roled to become an armoured unit to address the need for more armoured units in the Canadian Army, assuming the name "21st Canadian Armoured Regiment (GGFG)". It embarked for Great Britain on 23 September 1942. On 24 July 1944, it landed in France as part of the 4th Armoured Brigade, 4th Canadian Armoured Division, and it continued to fight in northwest Europe until the end of the war taking part in the battle of Normandy, the battle of the Scheldt, and the Rhineland. Over the course of the war the regiment's casualties were 101 dead and 284 wounded. The overseas regiment was disbanded on 31 January 1946.

=== Modern day ===
In the intervening years, members have participated in United Nations and NATO operations, including service in the Cyprus, Somalia, the Former Republic of Yugoslavia, Haiti, Ethiopia, and Sierra Leone. During the Canadian mission in Afghanistan, the GGFG deployed members, taking part Task Force 3-06, Task Force 3-08, and Task Force 1-10 in Kandahar, as well as the Operation Attention training mission in Kabul. The GGFG provides individual augmentation to the Regular Force when they deploy on operations. The regiment deployed members on Operation Impact in Iraq and Jordan, Operation Calumet in Egypt, Operation Soprano in Sudan, Operation Reassurance in Poland and Latvia, and Operation Unifier in Ukraine.

The regiment maintains domestic response capability to support Canadians at home in natural disasters or emergencies. The regiment deployed soldiers to the 1998 Ice Storm, floods 2017 and 2019, and during the COVID-19 pandemic in 2020.

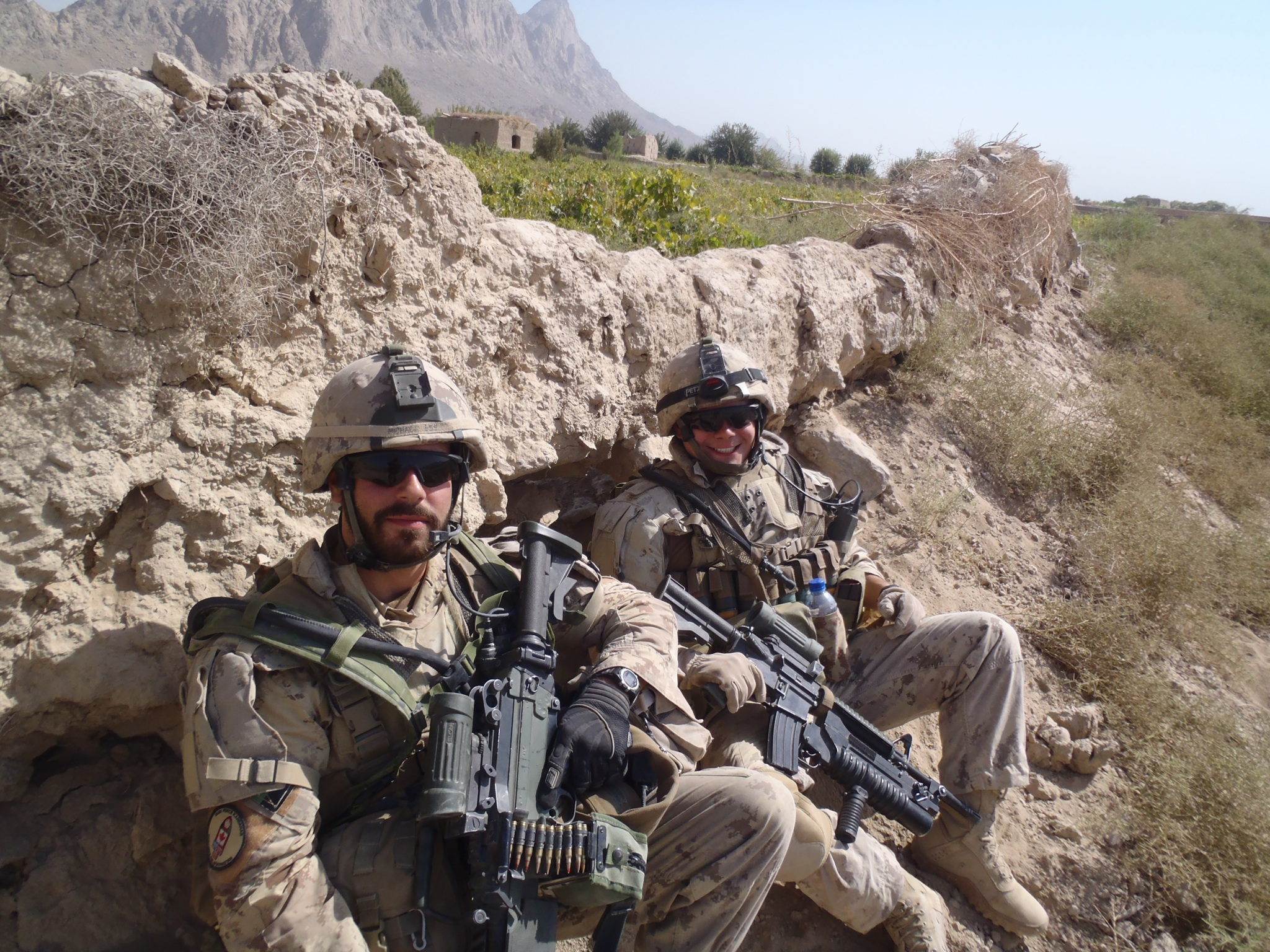
GGFG soldiers on patrol in Kandahar as part of the 1 RCR Battle Group in 2010.

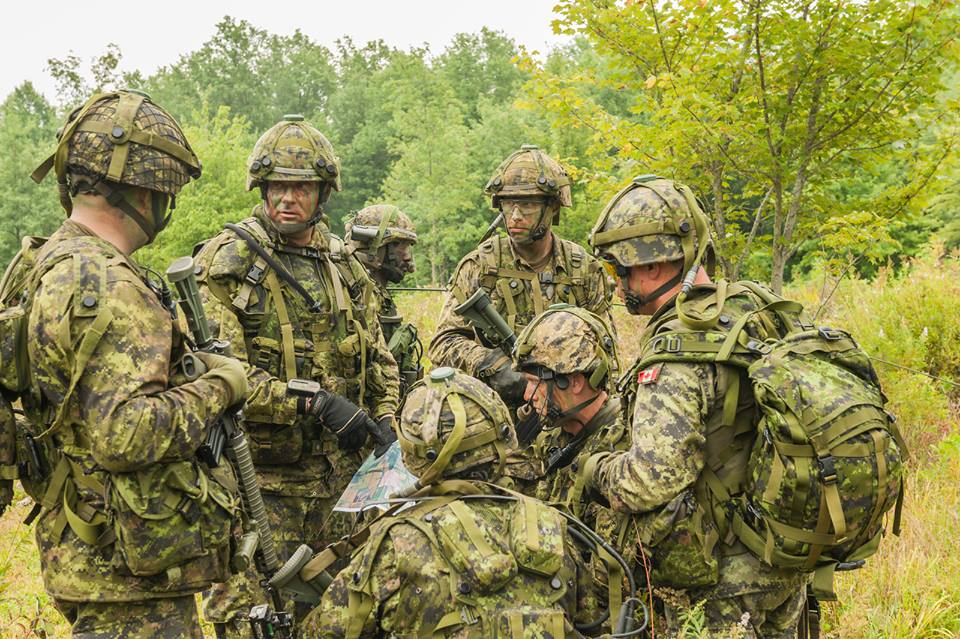
GGFG soldiers on exercise in Petawawa.

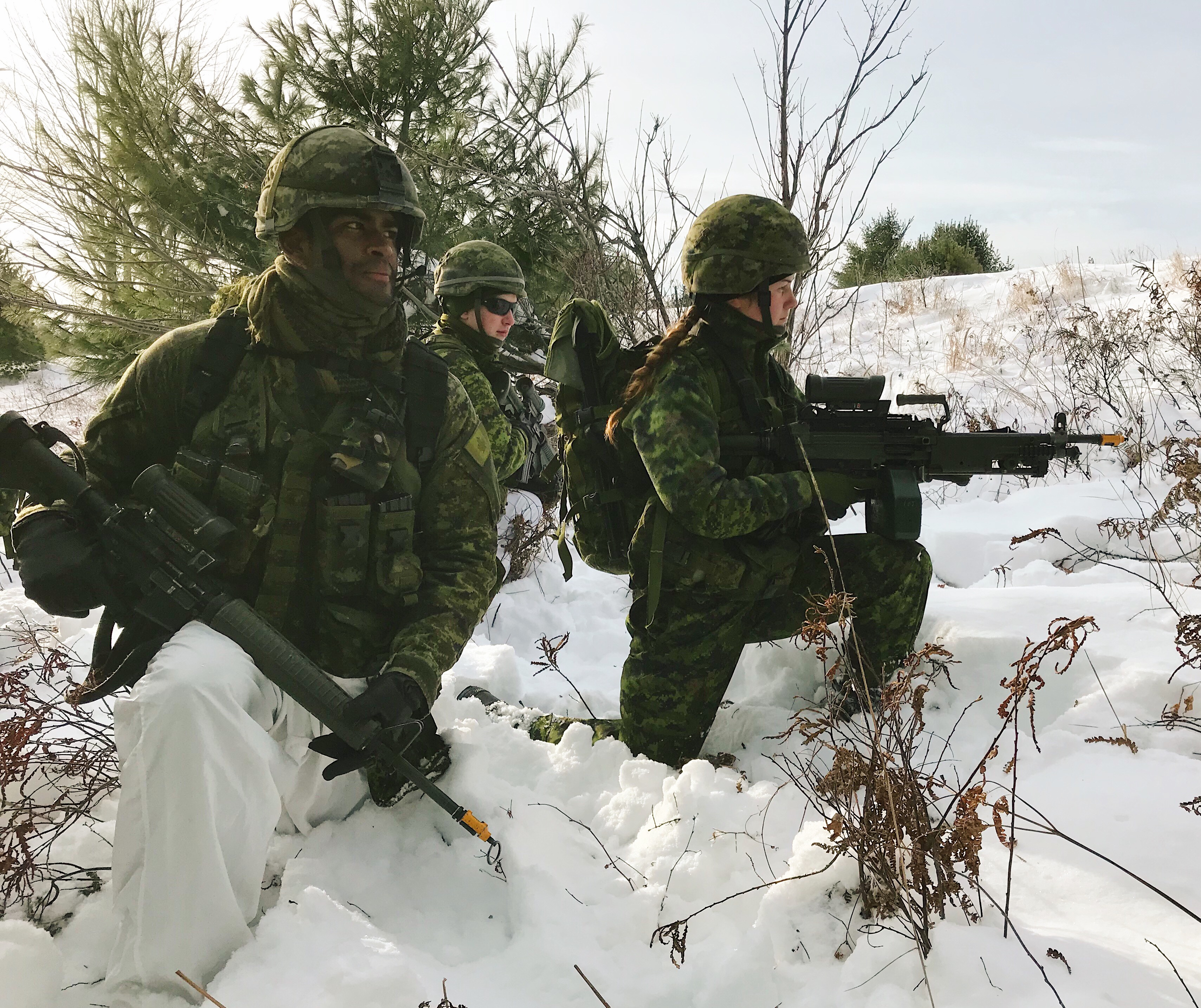
GGFG soldiers on a training exercise in Petawawa.

== Victoria Cross recipients ==
Recipient	Unit	Location	Date
(Acting) Corporal Leo Clarke (Note: Awarded posthumously)	2nd Battalion, Canadian Expeditionary Force	Pozières, France	September 9, 1916
(Acting) Major Okill Massey Learmonth	2nd Battalion, Canadian Expeditionary Force	Hill 70, France	August 18, 1917
(Acting) Corporal Filip Konowal	77th Battalion, Canadian Expeditionary Force	Hill 70, France	November 26, 1917

== Monuments ==
The No 1 Company Governor Generals Foot Guards and the Ladies Soldiers Aid Association of Ottawa erected a memorial tablet which was unveiled on May 2, 1887; The memorial is dedicated to the memory of Privates J. Rogers and Wm. B. Osgood who died in action at Cut Knife Hill on May 2, 1885, during the Northwest Rebellion.

A memorial plaque in the GGFG Regimental Museum is dedicated to the memory of the 5326 Officers and Men who served in the 2nd Canadian Infantry Battalion Canadian Expeditionary force during the Great War 1914-1918.

A Second World War–era Sherman tank nicknamed Forceful III in the Canadian War Museum, is dedicated to the memory of the members of the GGFG killed during the Second World War while operating as an armoured regiment.

== Lieutenant-colonels commanding ==
Lieutenant-colonels commanding
No.	Name	Took office	Left office	Time in office (years)	Governor general	Monarch
1	Thomas Ross	18 Jun 1872	19 Nov 1886	14	John Young, Frederick Hamilton-Temple-Blackwood, John Campbell, Henry Petty-Fitzmaurice	Queen Victoria
2	James Pennington MacPherson	20 Nov 1886	23 Nov 1888	2	Henry Petty-Fitzmaurice, Frederick Stanley	Queen Victoria
3	John Tilton	24 Nov 1888	29 Nov 1889	1	Frederick Stanley	Queen Victoria
4	Alfred Hamlyn	30 Nov 1889	23 Mar 1892	2	Frederick Stanley	Queen Victoria
5	Frederick Toller	24 Mar 1892	24 Oct 1894	2	Frederick Stanley, John Hamilton-Gordon	Queen Victoria
6	William Egerton Hodgins	25 Oct 1894	27 Oct 1899	5	John Hamilton-Gordon, Gilbert Elliot-Murray-Kynynmound	Queen Victoria / King Edward VII
7	Arthur Leonard Fitzgerald Jarvis	28 Oct 1899	3 March 1904	4	Gilbert Elliot-Murray-Kynynmound, Albert Grey	King Edward VII
8	Sydney Charles Dyne Roper	4 Mar 1904	1 Apr 1906	2	Albert Grey	King Edward VII
9	Henry Allan Bate	2 Apr 1906	22 Mar 1908	1	Albert Grey	King Edward VII
10	Douglas Richmond Street	23 Mar 1908	19 Oct 1910	2	Albert Grey	King Edward VII / King George V
11	James William Woods	20 Oct 1910	7 Nov 1917	7	Albert Grey, HRH Prince Arthur, Victor Cavendish	King George V
12	James Frederick Cunningham	8 Nov 1917	3 May 1920	2	Victor Cavendish	King George V
13	John Thomas Connelly Thompson	4 May 1920	5 May 1921	1	Victor Cavendish	King George V
14	William Bourbank Bartram	6 May 1921	5 Oct 1921	<1	Victor Cavendish, Julian Byng	King George V
15	Richard Francis Parkinson	6 Oct 1921	4 Oct 1925	3	Julian Byng	King George V
16	Charles Beresford Topp	5 Oct 1925	4 Apr 1930	4	Julian Byng, Freeman Freeman-Thomas	King George V
17	James Cuvillier Foy	5 Apr 1930	4 Apr 1934	3	Freeman Freeman-Thomas, Vere Ponsonby	King George V
18	Geoffery Gordon Chrysler	5 Apr 1934	4 Apr 1938	3	Vere Ponsonby, John Buchan	King George V / King Edward VIII / King George VI
19	William Godfrey Hoffman Wurtele	5 Apr 1938	25 Jan 1942	3	John Buchan, Alexander Cambridge	King George VI
20	Howard Wilfred Rick	26 Jan 1942	26 Aug 1943	1	Alexander Cambridge	King George VI
21	Murray Joseph Scott	27 Aug 1943	14 Aug 1944	<1	Alexander Cambridge	King George VI
22	Harold Foster Baker	15 Aug 1944	17 Aug 1944	<1	Alexander Cambridge	King George VI
23	Edward Marshall Smith	18 Aug 1944	1 Sep 1945	1	Alexander Cambridge	King George VI
24	George Taylor Baylay	2 Sep 1945	19 Feb 1946	<1	Alexander Cambridge	King George VI
25	Percy Hannaford	20 Feb 1946	2 Jan 1947	<1	Alexander Cambridge, Harold Alexander	King George VI
26	Herschell Allistar Smith	3 Jan 1947	3 Jan 1948	1	Harold Alexander	King George VI
27	George Patrick	4 Jan 1948	19 Aug 1952	4	Harold Alexander	King George VI / Queen Elizabeth II
28	Thomas Guy Bowie	20 Aug 1952	11 Nov 1957	5	Harold Alexander, Vincent Massey	Queen Elizabeth II
29	George Galt Aldous	12 Nov 1957	31 Jan 1960	2	Vincent Massey, Georges Vanier	Queen Elizabeth II
30	Charles Douglas Arthur	1 Feb 1960	13 Oct 1964	4	Georges Vanier	Queen Elizabeth II
31	Ian Albert Hodson	14 Oct 1964	14 Jul 1967	2	Georges Vanier, Roland Michener	Queen Elizabeth II
32	David Phillip William Wood	15 Jul 1967	29 Aug 1970	3	Roland Michener	Queen Elizabeth II
33	Howard Rodney Hill	30 Aug 1970	23 Sep 1973	3	Roland Michener	Queen Elizabeth II
34	Roy Longbottom	24 Sep 1973	17 Sep 1977	3	Roland Michener, Jules Léger	Queen Elizabeth II
35	Michael Eric Butler	18 Sep 1977	28 Jun 1980	2	Jules Léger, Edward Schreyer	Queen Elizabeth II
36	Paul Stanley Dunseath	29 Jun 1980	15 Jul 1984	4	Edward Schreyer, Jeanne Sauvé	Queen Elizabeth II
37	Lawrence Edward Lomas	16 Jul 1984	17 Jul 1988	4	Jeanne Sauvé	Queen Elizabeth II
38	J.A.E. Michel Simard	18 Jul 1988	30 Sep 1991	3	Jeanne Sauvé, Ray Hnatyshyn	Queen Elizabeth II
39	Donald Ian MacLeod	1 Oct 1991	17 Aug 1994	2	Ray Hnatyshyn	Queen Elizabeth II
40	Lawson Roy Hillier	18 Aug 1994	26 Jul 1997	2	Ray Hnatyshyn, Roméo LeBlanc	Queen Elizabeth II
41	William Scott Sturgess	27 Jul 1997	14 Jul 2000	2	Roméo LeBlanc, Adrienne Clarkson	Queen Elizabeth II
42	Stephen John Delaney	15 Jul 2000	27 Sep 2003	3	Adrienne Clarkson	Queen Elizabeth II
43	Nicholas Curcumelli-Rodostamo	28 Sep 2003	9 Sep 2006	2	Adrienne Clarkson, Michaëlle Jean	Queen Elizabeth II
44	Robert Michael Foster	10 Sep 2006	22 Sep 2009	3	Michaëlle Jean	Queen Elizabeth II
45	Derek Joseph Cheff	22 Sep 2009	16 Oct 2012	3	Michaëlle Jean, David Johnston	Queen Elizabeth II
46	Kevin MacLean	17 Oct 2012	29 Sept 2015	2	David Johnston	Queen Elizabeth II
47	Chris Lynam	30 Sept 2015	29 Oct 2019	4	David Johnston, Julie Payette	Queen Elizabeth II
48	Vincent Quesnel	30 Oct 2019	30 May 2023	4	Julie Payette, Mary Simon	Queen Elizabeth II / King Charles III
49	Jamie Bell	30 May 2023	15 September 2026	3	Mary Simon, Louise Arbour	King Charles III
50	Brian Wright	15 September 2026	Present		Louise Arbour	King Charles III

== Alliances ==
- United Kingdom – Coldstream Guards

== Battle honours ==
- North West Canada, 1885
- South Africa 1899–1900
- World War I: Ypres 1915, 1917, Flers-Courcelette, Passchendaele, Gravenstafel, Ancre Heights, Amiens, St. Julien, Arras 1917, 1918, Drocourt-Queant, Festubert, 1915, Vimy 1917, Hindenburg Line, Mount Sorrel, Arleux, Canal du Nord, Somme, 1916, Scarpe, 1917–18, Pursuit to Mons, Pozières, Hill 70, France and Flanders 1915–18
- World War II: The Hochwald, The Rhineland, Chambois, Falaise, Veen, The Scheldt, Falaise Road, Bad Zwichenahn, The Lower Maas, The Laison, North West Europe 1944-1945
- Afghanistan

== Rank names ==
Ensign
Second lieutenants (OF-1) in Guard regiments are referred by their former title of ensign (Esgn). The name derives from the task the newest joined officers were entrusted with, carrying the ensign or colours.
Colour sergeant
Personnel carrying the rank of warrant officer (OR-7) in Guard regiments are called by their former title of colour sergeant (CSgt). This rank originated from the appointment of specific sergeants to escort and defend the colours. Lower ranks refer to colour sergeants as "Sir" or "Ma'am" rather than "Warrant" as in other units.
Guardsman
Upon successful completion of recruit training soldiers are addressed as guardsman (Gdsm/OR-3). King George V awarded this honour in 1918 to mark the service of regiments of Foot Guards during the First World War. General Order 138 of 1928 promulgates this honour.
Musician
Upon successful completion of recruit training members of the band are addressed as musician (Muscn/OR-3).
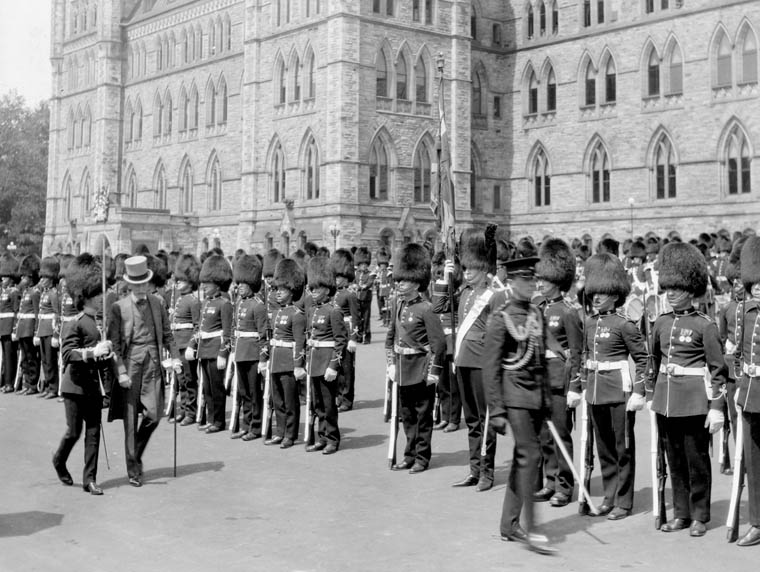
Viscount Willingdon inspecting the GGFG, 1927

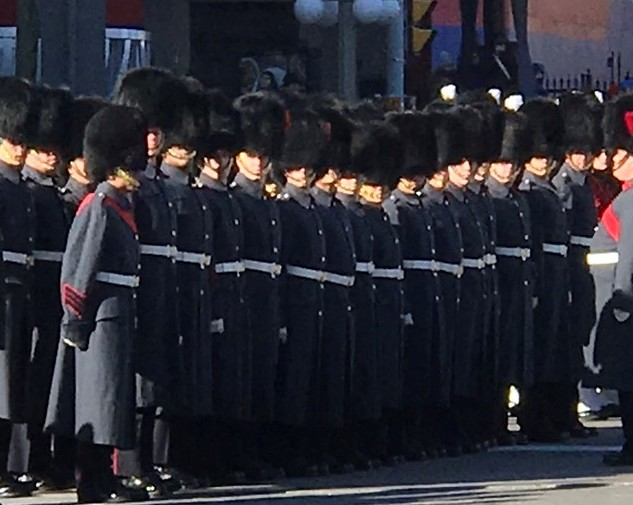
Members of the GGFG in their winter uniform, Remembrance Day 2017.

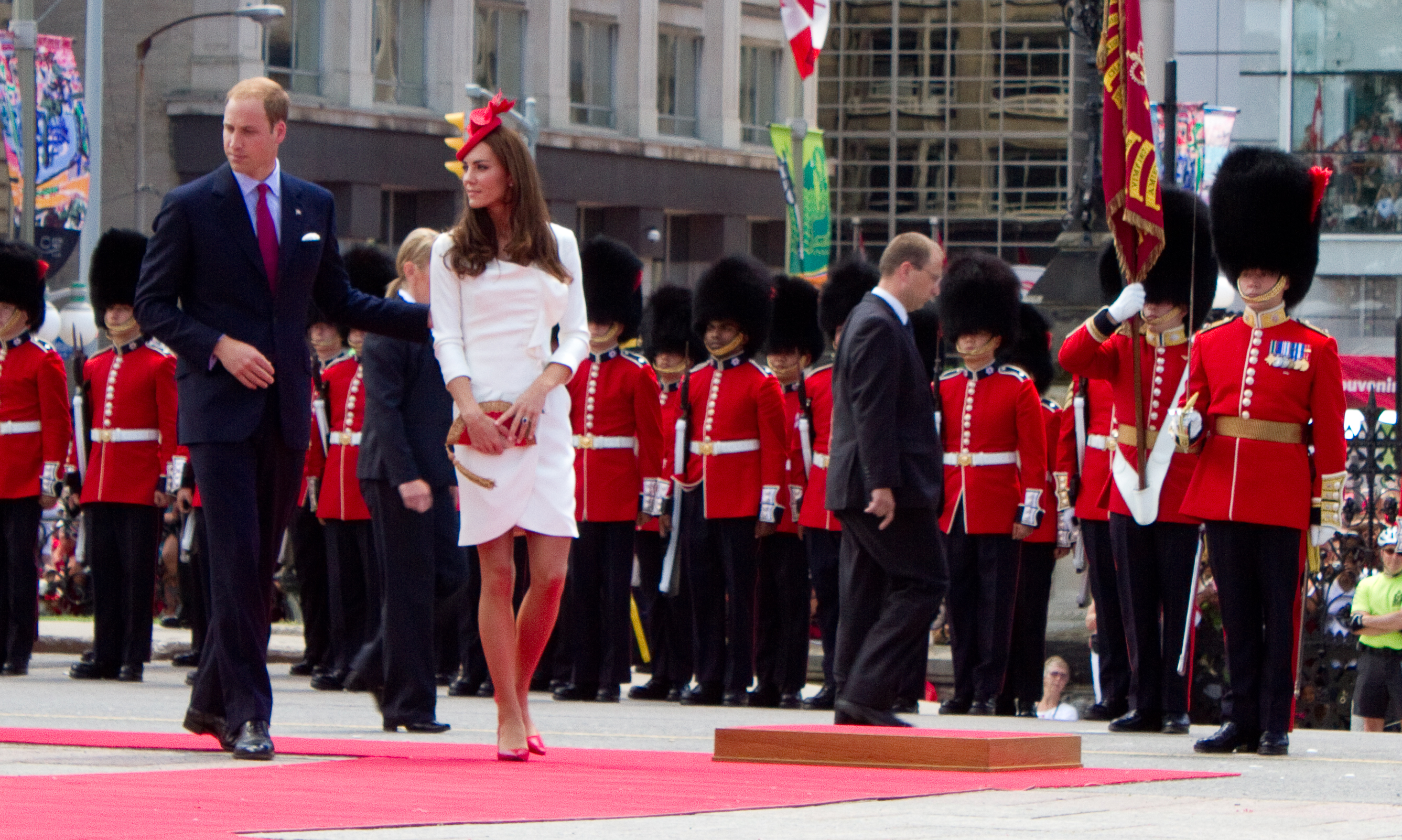
The Duke and Duchess of Cambridge inspecting the Governor General's Foot Guards

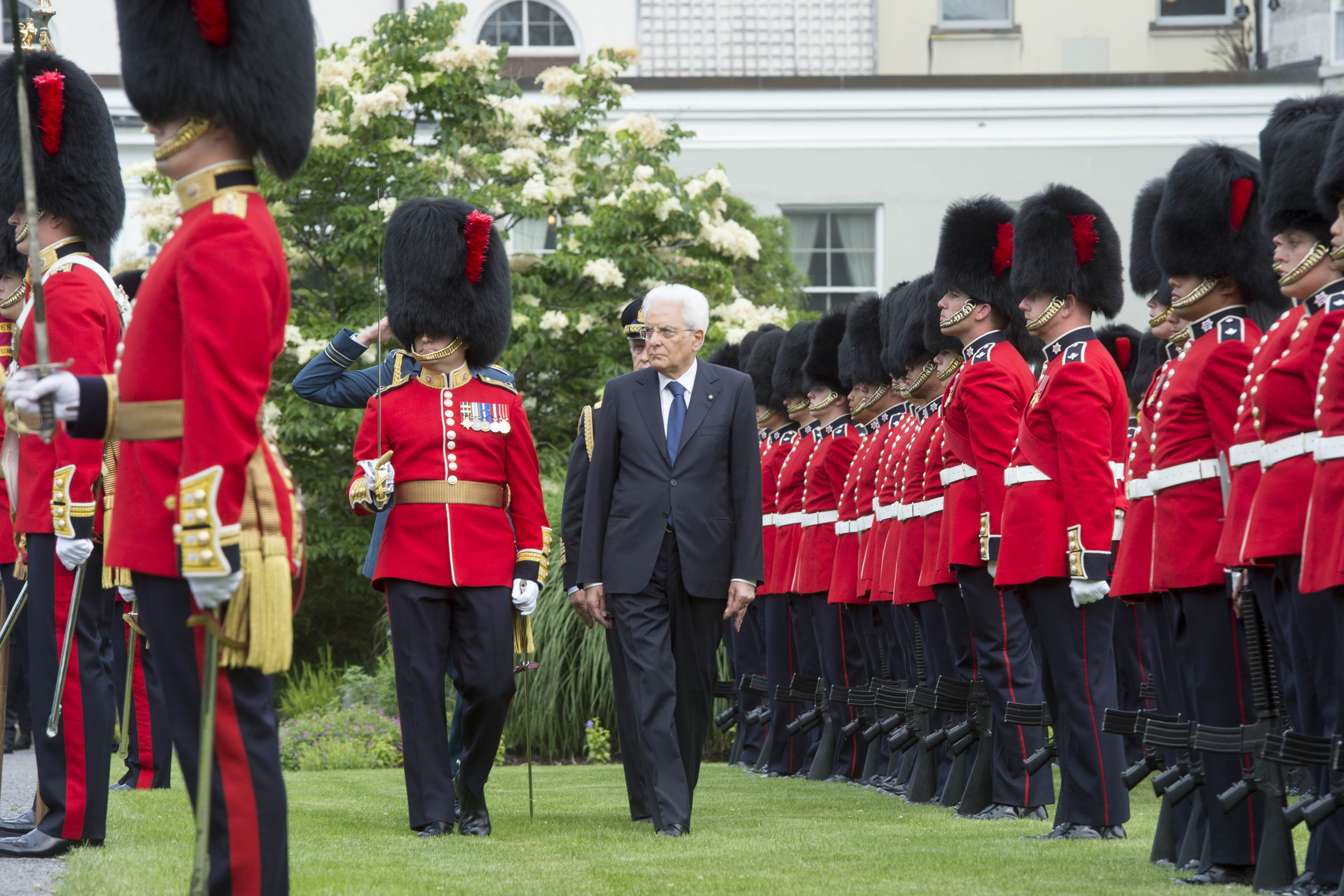
The President of Italy Sergio Mattarella inspects an honour guard of the GGFG during his visit to Rideau Hall.

== Regimental museum ==
Governor General's Foot Guards Regimental Museum
- Location: Cartier Square Drill Hall; Ottawa, Ontario
- Type: Regimental museum

The Governor General's Foot Guards Regimental Museum collects, preserves, studies and exhibits those objects that serve to illustrate the history and traditions of the regiment. The museum will collect materials that depict the regiment's past in terms of war, ceremonial, training, sport and other affairs that have influenced the regiment over the years. The museum will provide for the preservation of such material and for its availability to all those who wish to see and study it. The museum will be a non-profit educational establishment, operated for the regiment and open to the public, regardless of race, creed, or occupation. The museum will disseminate knowledge and stimulate interest through materials, information services by holding meetings and arranging special programs for the regiment, the association and the public for the furtherance of the purpose of the museum. The museum co-operates with the regiment, association, the National War Museum and other museums as well as the Municipality of Ottawa-Carleton, to collect and preserve materials of significance so that these materials may be preserved and aid in the advancement of knowledge of the regiment. The Guards' museum holds many artifacts from throughout the history of the regiment. Some of the artifacts displayed are a captured German trench periscope, various firearms from past wars including a Second World War–era German MG42, an MP 40, and a copy of Mein Kampf signed by Adolf Hitler. Also on display are several books containing photographs from World War II. The museum is in the south end of the Cartier Square Drill Hall and is open on parade nights or by appointment.

== Order of precedence ==
Preceded by Reserve Force units of Communications and Electronics Branch	The Governor General's Foot Guards	Succeeded by The Canadian Grenadier Guards

== Freedoms ==
The regiment has received the Freedom of the City twice throughout its history at the following occasions:

- (Ontario) 1972: Ottawa
- (Ontario) 2022: Ottawa

== Badge and motto ==
Coat of arms of the Governor General's Foot Guards
Notes Blazon of the badge: upon a six-pointed star rayonné Argent an annulus Gules edged and inscribed "Civitas et princeps cura nostra" in capital letters Or and enclosing a cross Azure fimbriated Argent. Motto Civitas et princeps cura nostra (Latin for 'Our country and ruler are our concern'). Symbolism The badge is based on the breast star of the Order of the Garter, which is used as the badge of the Coldstream Guards, an allied regiment whose uniform (with minor differences) is worn by the GGFG.

== Drill Hall ==
Site	Date(s)	Designated	Location	Description	Image
Cartier Square Drill Hall	1879	Classified - 1985 Register of the Government of Canada Heritage Buildings	On the bank of the Rideau Canal, just south of Laurier Avenue W. Ottawa, Ontario	A large and centrally located building with low-pitched gable roof houses The Cameron Highlanders of Ottawa (Duke of Edinburgh's Own) and GGFG and 2784 Governor General's Foot Guards Army Cadets	

== See also ==
- Canadian Guards
- List of armouries in Canada
- Military history of Canada
- History of the Canadian Army
- Governor General's Foot Guards Band
- Ceremonial Guard
