= 77th Battalion (Ottawa), CEF =

Canadian infantry battalion

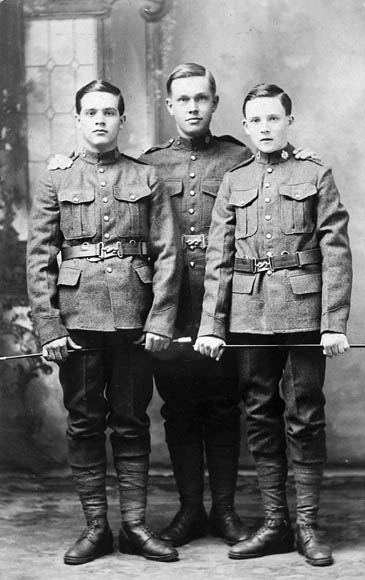
Young men from Metcalfe who enlisted in the 77th Battalion, Canadian Expeditionary Force

The 77th Battalion (Ottawa), CEF was an infantry battalion of the Canadian Expeditionary Force during the Great War. The 77th Battalion was authorized on 10 July 1915 and embarked for Great Britain on 19 June 1916. It provided reinforcements for the Canadian Corps until 22 September 1916, when its personnel were absorbed by the 47th Battalion (British Columbia), CEF and the 73rd Battalion (Royal Highlanders of Canada), CEF. The battalion was then disbanded.

The 77th Battalion recruited in Ottawa, Ontario and district and was mobilized at Ottawa.

The 77th Battalion was commanded by Lt.-Col. D.R. Street, 19 June 1916 – 13 September 1916.

The 77th Battalion was awarded the battle honour THE GREAT WAR 1916.

The 77th Battalion (Ottawa), CEF, is perpetuated by The Governor General's Foot Guards.

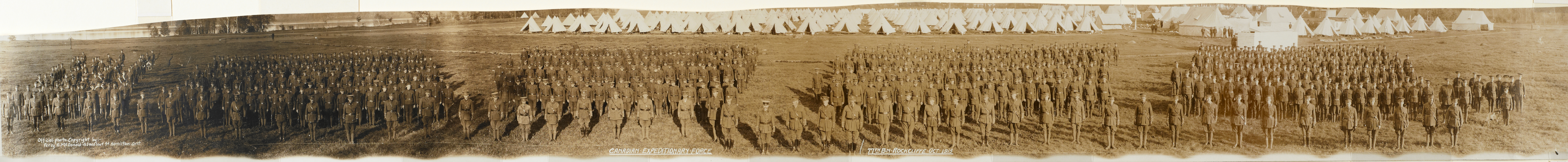

== Sources ==
- Canadian Expeditionary Force 1914-1919 by Col. G.W.L. Nicholson, CD, Queen's Printer, Ottawa, Ontario, 1962
