= Prison for Women (Kingston, Ontario) =

Prison in Ontario, Canada

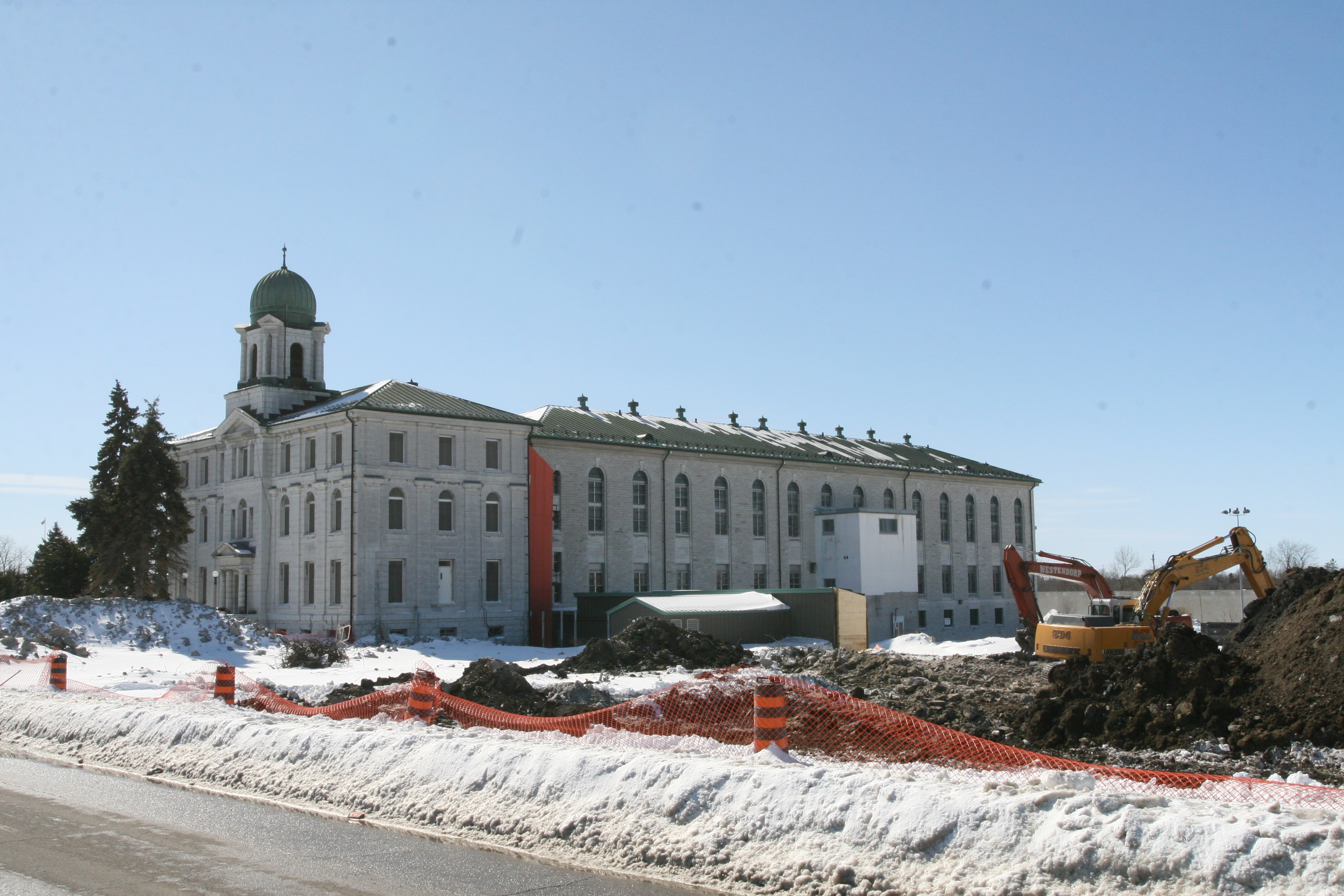
- Demolition of the stone security wall on March 10, 2008
- Interactive map of Prison for Women
- Location: Kingston, Ontario, Canada; 44.2225°N 76.5133°W
- Status: Closed
- Security class: Maximum
- Opened: 1934
- Closed: 2000
- Managed by: Correctional Service of Canada

Notable prisoners
- Karla Homolka Ann Hansen Evelyn Dick

The Prison For Women ("P4W"; French: Prison des femmes), located in Kingston, Ontario, was a Correctional Service of Canada prison for women that functioned at a maximum security level from 1934 to 2000. Known for its controversial legacy and significance as Canada's only federal-level penitentiary for women until 2000, the institution housed some of Canada’s most serious female offenders until its decommissioning following years of criticism and scrutiny over inmate treatment. The prison, designed in Neoclassical style by Henry H. Horsey, later became a federal heritage site. Throughout its history, P4W faced ongoing controversies, including inmate abuse, racial discrimination, unethical experiments, and a notorious 1994 riot that led to the influential Arbour Report, eventually prompting significant reforms in the Canadian correctional system.

== Background ==
From 1835 until 1934 maximum security female offenders in Canada were housed in the “Female Department” of the men’s Kingston Penitentiary. Female inmates were at first housed on a segregated floor from the male prisoners and later on in an adjoining building on the grounds. They were confined to their cells except for meal breaks, chapel on Sundays, and assigned work tasks which included cleaning, laundry, textile production, and meal preparation for the prison. Unlike their male counterparts, female inmates at Kingston did not have access to their own schoolroom. They were instead provided with school books and pencils to educate themselves independently in their cells after working hours, however records of any “curricula, exercises, or tests” provided to the women are limited.

According to government reports, female inmates at Kingston Penitentiary were “expected to be silent unless given permission to speak as part of their job”. Punishments for infractions such as “injurious speech”, which made up the majority of recorded ‘misbehaviour’ for female inmates, included (but were not limited to): public lashings, solitary confinement, bread and water diets, head shaving, and confinement in coffin-shaped “isolation boxes” which were kept in the dining hall. A 1920-1921 RCMP investigation highlighted the inadequate conditions of the penitentiary’s “female department” citing insufficient ventilation, plumbing, access to education and reading material, as well as inappropriate use of solitary confinement.

This investigation, as well as overcrowding and concern over mixed-gendered housing eventually led to the need for separate female facilities. Construction began in May 1925 and the Kingston Prison for Women opened across the street from the men’s facilities in 1934. The work crews who built the facilities were made up of male prisoners from the neighbouring Kingston Penitentiary.

Until 2000, any woman in Canada serving two or more years in prison would be sent to Kingston Prison for Women (P4W ref). However, due to structural changes, inmates were gradually transferred to other regional-level federal correctional institutions for women starting in 1995. On May 8, 2000, the last female inmate was transferred away from P4W.

The institution, and several women who were incarcerated there, were profiled in Janis Cole and Holly Dale's 1981 documentary film P4W: Prison for Women.

Since the prison’s closure in 2000, the P4W building functioned for many years as an administrative building for Kinston Penitentiary. In January 2008, Queen's University took ownership of the former site of the Prison for Women. The property is 8.1 acres (33,000 m^{2}) in size. The university archives were originally slated to be housed there once renovations were completed, but this is no longer the case. The transformation of the property included the demolition of three of the four stone security walls. In June 2018 Queens University sold the site to ABNA Investments Ltd. In 2021 Signature Retirement Living announced plans to turn the property into a seniors community. In February 2023 it was announced that this plan had been cancelled and that the property would instead be developed into a mixed-use neighbourhood. As of October 2024, the property is owned by Siderius Developments and is slated for redevelopment, with plans to turn the former cell block building into a boutique condominium complex.

=== Structure and architectural significance ===
Designed by architect and specialist in prison design Henry H. Horsey, the former Prison for Women (also known as Building A3), is a prime example of modernized Neoclassical Architecture in Canada.Although similar in style to the adjoining Kingston Penitentiary as well as many other public buildings of the late 19th and early 20th century in Canada, P4W is the last remaining building designed by Horsey still standing on the property, which encompasses the P4W, the former Kingston Penitentiary and a variety of other smaller prison facilities. Constructed between 1909 and 1913 and designated a fully separate facility from the male prison in 1934, the building was officially recognized as a Federal Heritage Building on May 18th, 1990. Its heritage significance is based upon “its historic association, the quality of its architecture, and the integrity of its environment”. It is also notable in the history of Canadian penology and the “evolution of thought” concerning the gendered separation of prisoners in the Country.

== Inmate experience ==
Government investigations as early as 1938 highlighted lack of adequate facilities and poor treatment of inmates, with a 1977 report describing the prison as “unfit for bears, much less women”. Government reports and inmate surveys have shown that mental health problems among the prison population was a widespread issue, and incidents of self-harm and suicide among inmates was rampant. The 1995-1996 Arbour Investigation revealed that mental health crises were regularly dealt with by putting the inmates in involuntary segregation for extended periods of time—sometimes for months or even years— leading to what Justice Louise Arbour described as “deleterious” effects on the women’s mental health.

Issues of racial discrimination were prevalent within the facility. Routinely over-classified in their security category, Indigenous inmates constituted a considerable proportion of the inmate population and reported particularly violent treatment by prison staff. Suicide rates were also considerably higher among Indigenous inmates than their counterparts; between 1988-1991 seven Indigenous women died by suicide.

== Controversies ==
=== LSD experiments ===
Between the 1950s and early 1970s, Canadian correctional facilities, including Kingston's Prison for Women, conducted experimental research involving inmates, primarily under government-sanctioned programs. This period marked a controversial chapter in Canadian penal and medical history, reflecting broader institutional practices in North America regarding the use of inmates and psychiatric patients for scientific research. At P4W, experimental projects included sensory deprivation, electroshock therapy (ECT), and the administration of hallucinogens such as Lysergic acid diethylamide (LSD).

One well-documented case involved the administration of LSD to at least 23 female inmates during the early 1960s. Correctional researchers, including prison psychiatrists, viewed LSD as a potential therapeutic tool capable of dismantling mental barriers in psychological treatment. However, informed consent procedures were often inadequate or nonexistent, and subjects included vulnerable individuals, such as 17-year-old Dorothy Proctor, who experienced traumatic hallucinations and lasting psychological effects. Some participants reported flashbacks, anxiety, and other symptoms of Post-Hallucinogen Perceptual Disorder (PHPD), a recognized condition marked by recurring sensory disturbances.

The ethical implications of these experiments, including those involving solitary confinement and sensory deprivation studies, have been debated. Many researchers argued their practices aligned with the standards of the time, though contemporary assessments highlight severe ethical lapses. Investigations by Correctional Services Canada in the late 1990s recommended official apologies and reparations for those affected, noting the potential long-term impact on participants' mental health. Despite the historical context justifying certain experimental approaches, subsequent policy reforms emphasized the need for explicit ethical oversight and protections for incarcerated individuals.

=== 1994 prison riot and Arbour Report ===
On April 22, 1994 a riot stemming from an argument over medication and an alleged racist remark from a prison guard, culminated in a violent altercation involving eight inmates and prison staff. The women, frustrated with perceived racial discrimination and systemic neglect, barricaded themselves, started fires, and attacked a guard with a syringe before taking another one hostage. Correctional authorities responded by calling in an all-male Institutional Emergency Response Team from the neighbouring Kingston Penitentiary, who forcibly restrained the women and conducted illegal strip searches. These actions, later captured on videotape and aired on The Fifth Estate, raised concerns of excessive and dehumanizing force, as male guards were seen cutting away female inmates' clothing during searches.

Following significant media attention and public outcry, Solicitor General Herb Gray commissioned an independent investigation led by Justice Louise Arbour. The resulting “Commission of Inquiry into Certain Events at the Prison for Women in Kingston” (commonly referred to as the Arbour Report) condemned the actions of prison officials, citing a "systemic" culture of disregard for prisoners’ rights. Justice Arbour’s findings outlined a pattern of "cruel, inhumane, and degrading treatment" toward the women and criticized Corrections Canada for prioritizing control over prisoners’ rights. Arbour’s recommendations included reforms to prevent future rights abuses, such as the prohibition of male guards in performing strip searches on female inmates and improved mental health support.

The Arbour Report had significant implications for Canada’s correctional system. Its publication prompted resignations within the federal prison administration and led to policy changes, including the formation of all-female emergency response teams and enhanced oversight to protect inmates' legal rights. Despite concerns over the actual implementation of the changes suggested in Arbour’s report (former director of the Canadian Association of Elizabeth Fry Societies Kim Pate once described the Correctional Service of Canada’s efforts as “extremely selective and somewhat self-serving”) it remains a landmark document advocating for the rule of law and accountability within Canadian prisons, influencing ongoing debates about human rights and prison reform in Canada.

== Legacy ==
=== Tightwire ===
Cover of the Fall 1993 issue, edited by Melissa Stewart.

From 1970-1995 P4W inmates self-published a quarterly prison newspaper entitled Tightwire. Although heavily censored by prison management, contributors to the zine submitted original art and poetry and wrote on a wide variety of topics including politics, health, prison reform, harm reduction, race, feminism, and spirituality. It also included news updates from outside the prison (including other correctional institutions) and general information for P4W inmates such as PSAs about health and prison programming. It is notable as one of the few entirely self-produced women’s prison publications in Canada, along with Grand Valley Institution’s Grapevine and Okimaw Ohci Healing Lodge’s Okimaw Ohci Newsletter

Former inmates have described the positive impact Tightwire had on the social environment of the prison, noting how it encouraged mutual respect and understanding among the women, while also giving them a creative and intellectual outlet. Melissa Munn, Okanagan College professor of sociology and founder of the Penal Press archive, notes that Tightwire “gave women a forum to be heard and to demand attention to their issues…it gave them a voice to agitate for change that they would not have had otherwise”.

Digital scans of Tightwire publications from 1978-1993 remain available on the open-source archive “The Gaucher/Munn Penal Press Collection”. Run by professor Munn, the ongoing project aims to provide free primary source access to “prison history from within”, focusing on current and past publications from Canadian (as well as other English-language) prison publications.

=== P4W Memorial Collective ===
In 2015, former inmates Fran Chaisson, Laurel Klaus, Jackie Davis, and Ann Hansen formed the “Prison for Women (P4W) Memorial Collective”. Composed of formerly incarcerated women and their allies, the collective organizes gatherings including healing circles, film screenings, letter writing campaigns, and roundtable discussions in an effort to commemorate the lives lost at the prison and advocate for former and currently incarcerated women in Canada. Aside from their annual Prisoners’ Justice Day Ceremony on August 10th, the collective’s main focus is the construction of a memorial garden in front of the former cell block, in which they plan to feature a monument inscribed with the names of women who died while incarcerated in Canada. Currently in the fundraising stage, the collective envisions the memorial garden as a community gathering space for healing and remembering, as well as learning about prisoner experience and the Canadian correctional system.

== Directors ==
- 1934–1944 Edith A. Robinson, Supervising Matron
- 1944–1950 Amelia May Gibson, Supervising Matron
- 1950–1960 Lorraine L. Burke, Supervising Matron
- 1960–1966 Isabel J. McNeill, Superintendent
- 1966–1970 Donald Clarke, Warden
- 1970–1972 C.A.M. Edwards, Warden
- 1972–1980 Doug Chinnery, Warden
- 1980–1987 George Caron, Warden
- 1987–1994 Mary Cassidy, Warden
- 1994–2000 Thérèse LeBlanc, Warden

== Notable prisoners ==
- Evelyn Dick - Convicted of manslaughter in the death of her infant son
- Karla Homolka – Transferred to Joliette Institution after P4W closed.
- Ann Hansen – Canadian anarchist and former member of Squamish Five.

== See also ==
- Incarceration of women
- Archambault report
- Prisoner abuse
- Experimentation on prisoners
- MKUltra
- Montreal experiments
- Prisoner's rights
