= Governor General's Foot Guards Band =

Band of the Canadian Forces

Governor General's Foot Guards Band La Musique des Governor General's Foot Guards
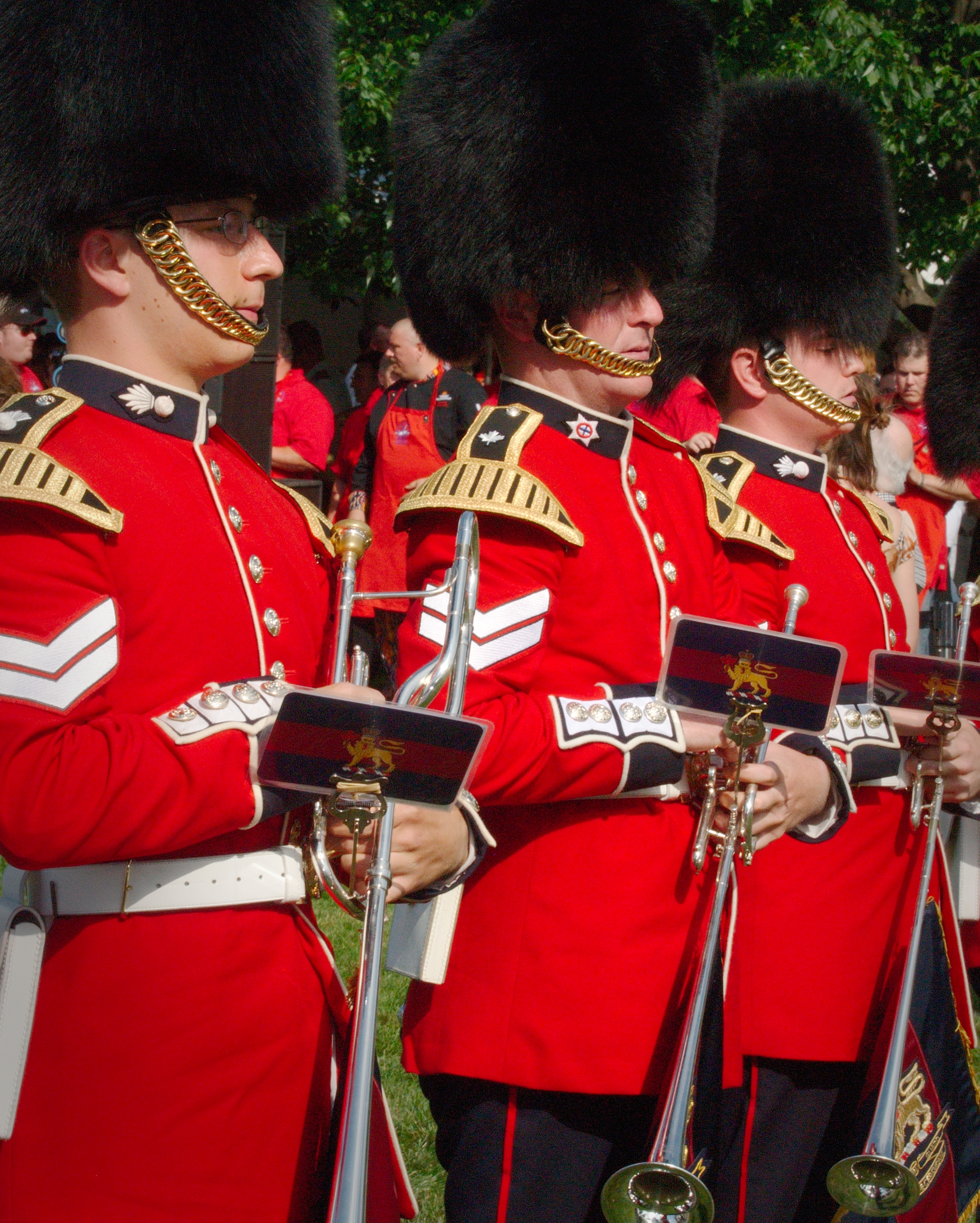
- Active: 15 June 1872-Present
- Country: Canada
- Branch: Canadian Army - Primary Reserve
- Type: Military band
- Role: Public Duties
- Size: 35
- Part of: Governor General's Foot Guards
- Headquarters: Ottawa
- Mottos: Civitas et Princeps Cura Nostra (Our Care is King and Country)
- March: Quick: Milanollo; Slow: Figaro
- Acronym: GGFG Band

Commanders
- Notable commanders: Captain Stefan Sikorski

The Governor General's Foot Guards Band (French: La Musique des Governor General's Foot Guards) is an authorized Canadian Forces 35-piece brass and reed band. It consists of serving members of the CAF who parade on a part-time basis. It serves as the regimental band of the Governor General's Foot Guards (GGFG) and is the most senior band of the Canadian Army Primary Reserve.

== Overview ==
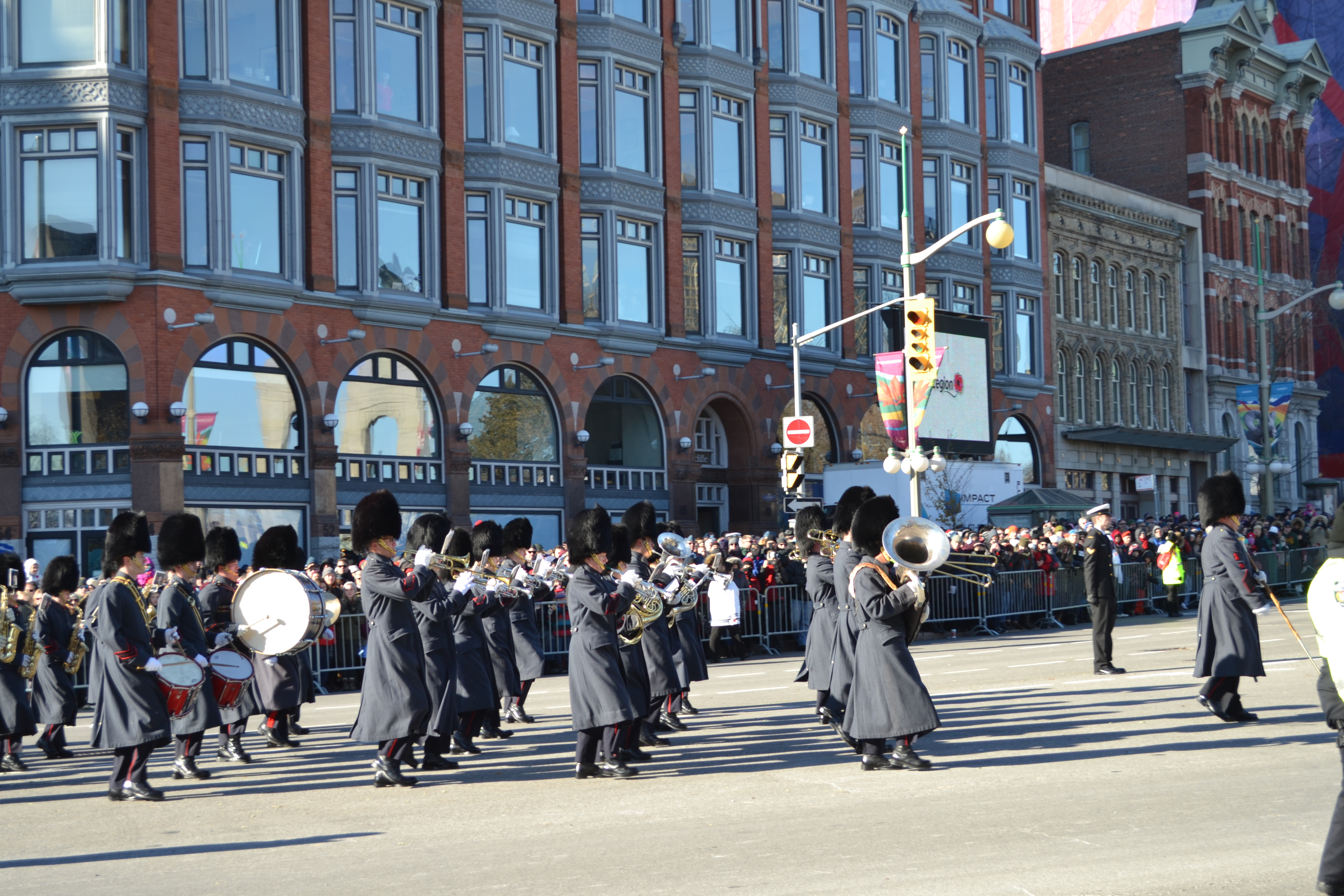
The band during a Remembrance Day parade in Ottawa.

The band was formed soon after the establishment of the Governor General's Foot Guards in 1872. Many of its members at that time were from the Band of the Ottawa Brigade of Garrison Artillery. In 1888, the band attracted controversy when it refused to perform at multiple events unless they were given adequate pay. In 1891, the band was part of the funeral procession for Sir John A. Macdonald, the 1st Prime Minister of Canada. The band made its first international debut in 1906 under its first director, John C. Bonner, when it travelled to New York City. During the visit, the band performed at the West Point Band, with the latter playing The Stars and Stripes Forever and the former playing God Save the King.

Joseph T. Brown led the band at the opening of Madison Square Gardens in New York in 1925 and at the opening of the Peace Bridge between Buffalo and Fort Erie in 1937. The band made several appearances during the visit of George VI in 1939, including the Trooping of the Colour in front of Centre Block. After World War II the band's summer concerts were broadcast on local radio, and it participated in many massed band displays and tattoos on Parliament Hill. Its first major activity following the war was the coronation day ceremonies in front of Centre Block that included the Trooping of the Colour by the GGFG in front of Governor-General Vincent Massey. Under Milne, the increased its role in the new Canadian Armed Forces, traveling to Washington, DC, Atlanta, and Toronto among other cities. It also regularly performs at state functions in Ottawa, particularly at Rideau Hall, the official residence of both the Canadian monarch and his or her representative. The band has recently taken part in military tattoos, including the RCMP Sunset Ceremony and the Fortissimo Sunset Ceremony. The band has produced two recordings: On Parliament Hill (1972, Kanata KAN-8) and Changing the Guard (1982, GGFG FG-1002). In 2015, the GGFG pipes and drums represented the Canadian Forces at the Bermuda Tattoo for the second time since 2009 to mark the 50th anniversary of the Bermuda Regiment.

== Directors ==
- John C. Bonner (1872–1874)
- James Carter (1874–1877)(1888–1895)
- Arthur A. Clappé (1877–1884)
- Captain Joseph Miller Brown (1900–1923)
- Joseph T. Brown
- Major F. W. Coleman
- Captain Alex McCurrdie
- RCMP Superintendent Edwin Joseph Lydall (1968–1970)
- Captain George Aubrey (1970–1977)
- Major James Ralph Milne (1979)
- Captain Terry Porter (unknown–2005)
- Lieutenant Colonel Frances Chilton-Mackay (2005–2016) (first female director)
- Captain Stefan Sikorski (2016–2023)
- Captain Samantha Parent (2023–2025)
- Master Warrant Officer Rob McKinnon (2025–present)

== See also ==
- Band of the Ceremonial Guard
- Canadian Grenadier Guards Band
- Central Band of the Canadian Armed Forces
- La Musique du Royal 22e Régiment
