= O'Connor Justice Prize =

The O'Connor Justice Prize, named for former United States Supreme Court justice Sandra Day O’Connor, was established in 2014 to raise visibility for rule-of-law initiatives; recognize people who have made extraordinary contributions to advancing the rule of law, justice, and human rights; and to honor O'Connor's legacy.

A group led by former Arizona Supreme Court Justice Ruth McGregor, who served as a law clerk for O'Connor from 1981 to 1982, developed the prize to honor O'Connor's legacy. The prize is administered by the Sandra Day O'Connor College of Law at Arizona State University.

== Honorees ==
- 2014: Navanethem "Navi" Pillay, United Nations high commissioner for human rights
- 2016: Ana Palacio, member of the Council of State of Spain and former senior vice president and general counsel of the World Bank Group
- 2017: Jimmy Carter, 39th president of the United States
- 2018: Anson Chan, former chief secretary for administration for the Hong Kong Special Administrative Region
- 2019: F. W. de Klerk, former president of South Africa
- 2020: Nadia Murad, Yazidi human rights activist
- 2021: Elizabeth Odio Benito, former president of the Inter-American Court of Human Rights
- 2023: Louise Arbour, former United Nations high commissioner for human rights and former justice of the Supreme Court of Canada
- 2024: Rangina Hamidi, former minister of education of Afghanistan
