= Prisoners' Justice Day =

Annual solidarity movement

Prisoners' Justice Day is a solidarity movement that takes place annually on August 10. The movement began in Canada in 1974 in support of prisoners’ rights and to remember all the people who have died of unnatural deaths while incarcerated. The first Prisoners' Justice Day was held at the Millhaven Institution on August 10, 1975, on the first anniversary of Edward Nalon's death. In addition to a day of mourning, six prisoners took part in an eighteen-day hunger strike. In 1976, August 10 was recognized as a memorial day where prisoners would strike in opposition to the use of solitary confinement and to protest inmate conditions within the Prison System by going on a one-day hunger strike and refusing to work.

== Historical development ==
=== Edward Nalon ===
On August 10, 1974, while in segregation at the Millhaven Institution, inmate Edward Nalon took his own life by severing the arteries in his elbow. Leading up to his suicide, Nalon had requested to be transferred to a non-working unit. Guards told him that in order to get a transfer he must sign a form refusing to work. Instead, he was transferred to segregation on June 7, 1974, and then into solitary confinement on June 14, 1974. Nalon was then released from solitary confinement back into segregation, where he requested to be transferred back into general population on July 28, 1974. On July 31, 1974, the Inmate Training Board granted his transfer back into the general population; however, there was no communication for ten days between Millhaven's administration and Nalon regarding the status of his transfer and on August 10, 1974, he died by suicide.

On April 14, 1975, a Coroner's Inquest was filed into the death of Edward Nalon and the following recommendations were outlined:

1. Communication regarding transfers be carried out without delay
2. Prison medical practitioners relate mental and physical concerns regarding the prisoners being kept in segregation to the Segregation Review Board
3. Operational emergency alarm signals within cells
4. A functional time clock to ensure hourly check-ups by guards
5. Emergency first aid training for all Millhaven institutional staff

=== Robert Landers ===
On May 21, 1976, Robert (Bobby) Landers died while in segregation at Millhaven Institution. Landers tried to call for medical help, however, the emergency system within the prisoners' cells was not functioning, despite having been recommended for repair during the coroner's inquest into Nalon's death. Later, an inquest into Landers' death was held, during which a heart specialist determined he had died from a heart attack, and that he should have been placed in an intensive care unit rather than in solitary confinement. Landers' death not only forced the Correctional Service of Canada (then Canadian Penitentiary Service) to implement emergency call systems but also resulted in further National support for Prisoners' Justice Day.

== Committees ==
Prisoner justice committees formed in several provinces across Canada; including Quebec, Ontario, and British Columbia, and contained both incarcerated and non-incarcerated members. These groups demanded changes in the treatment of incarcerated people, specifically regarding their human rights. The Quarter Century Group was one of the founding committees in the Millhaven Institution which paved the way for the creation of the Odyssey Group in 1976 after Nalon and Landers' deaths while in segregation. The Odyssey Group was formed by fifteen long term prisoners with the goal of bringing awareness to outside community members of the injustices committed by the Canadian Correctional Service. The Odyssey Group used The Odyssey Newsletter to educate other incarcerated people across Canada and gain outside support regarding prisoners' rights. As national awareness spread for Prisoners' Justice Day, groups such as Claire Culhane's Prisoners' Rights Group of Vancouver, Prisoners' Rights Group of Montréal, and Civil Liberties of Ottawa organized events in support.

Despite Prisoners' Justice Day being a non-violent protest consisting of hunger strikes and refusal to work, many incarcerated people were punished by their prison administrations for participating. Punishments included solitary confinement and involuntary transfer to higher security penitentiaries. These punishments were imposed for participating in the August 10th protest or for holding a leadership position in a prisoner justice committee.

== Demands ==
Across Canada, the advocacy groups demanded various human rights improvements for prisoners. The following demands were published on August 10, 1979, in The Odyssey Newsletter:

1. The right to meaningful work with fair wages
2. The right to useful education and training
3. The right to proper medical attention
4. The right to freedom of speech and religion
5. The right to adequate legal services

Other changes were pursued, including reforms to solitary confinement and over-incarceration of marginalized groups.

=== Solitary confinement ===
Solitary confinement (or segregation) has negative psychological effects on all prisoners and is especially damaging to those with mental illnesses. It prevents prisoners from having access to physical exercise, social encounters and hobbies. Solitary confinement can cause mental distress and increases the risk of self harm and suicide. Between 1970 and 1974, seven prisoners spent 11.5 years in solitary confinement at the British Columbia Penitentiary. Specifically, Jack Emmett McCann spent a total of 1,471 days in solitary, 754 of those days being consecutive. McCann and several other plaintiffs filed a statement of claim McCann et al. v. The Queen and Dragan Cernetic stating that their containment "infringed upon their right to freedom from cruel and unusual treatment or punishment under section 2(b) of the Canadian Bill of Rights." According to the United Nations "prolonged isolation of detainees may amount to cruel, inhuman or degrading treatment or punishment and, in certain instances, may amount to torture" In 2019, Bill C-38 was passed which replaces the use of segregation in federal penitentiaries with structured intervention units (SIUs). Inmates in SIU will remain in the same segregation cells as before but will be allowed four hours outside their cells per day and additional healthcare access.

=== Over-incarceration of minorities and marginalized people ===
Prisoners' Justice Day advocates want to combat the overrepresentation of racial minorities and marginalized peoples in penitentiaries. The overincarceration of Indigenous people is a "colonial effect" in countries formed through colonization such Australia, New Zealand, Canada and the United States. The Canadian Parliament enacted section 718.2 (e) of the Criminal Code in 1996, better known as the Gladue Report to combat the overrepresentation of Indigenous peoples in Canadian prisons. Additional Indigenous programming was implemented inside prisons, and Indigenous courts were created in Toronto, Calgary, Saskatchewan, and British Columbia. Despite the implementation of Gladue Reports, Indigenous programs, and Indigenous courts, the percentage of federally incarcerated Indigenous peoples doubled in the period from 2005 to 2015.

Indigenous women are more overrepresented in the Canadian federal correctional system than Indigenous men. The Prison for Women (P4W) in Kingston, Ontario was the only maximum security women's prison until its closure 2001. The facility closed after fifteen inquiries, commissions and reports concerning poor conditions for women and the effect these conditions had on increased suicide rates.

== International event ==
In 1983, prisoners in France joined the August 10 solidarity movement by refusing to eat. Germany, England and the United States began practicing non-violent protests during the 1990s.
