= Regional Psychiatric Centre =

- Corrections Canada

Geography
- Location: Saskatoon, Saskatchewan, Canada
- Coordinates: 52°09′43″N 106°36′09″W

Organization
- Type: Specialist
- Affiliated university: University of Saskatchewan

Services
- Beds: 171
- Speciality: custodial forensic psychiatry

History
- Opened: 1978

Links
- Lists: Hospitals in Canada

Canadian Prisons
Regional Psychiatric Centre
Location:	2520 Central Avenue; Saskatoon, Saskatchewan
Status:	Operational
Classification:	multiple
Capacity:	171 men and women
Opened:	14 November 1978
Closed:
Managed by:	Corrections Canada

The Regional Psychiatric Centre is classified as a custodial forensic psychiatry facility (Federal Forensic Hospital) with multiple security levels with a staff of 345, it is located on a 55-acre (22 ha) parcel of land owned by the University of Saskatchewan and opened in 1978. It is the only psychiatric hospital in Canada with a therapeutic healing program designed for women offenders.

The centre is the only of its kind affiliated with a university medical school and accredited as a hospital; patients are admitted and discharged by medical staff with senior medical staff and faculty jointly appointed with the university providing for the development of treatment and research programs. The centre is one of the residency training locations used by the Psychiatry Program at the University of Saskatchewan College of Medicine.

== Major incidents ==
- The Ashley Smith inquest examined a patient that was treated at the centre and moved back and forth with other institutions.

== References in the media ==
- Karla (film)
