= Suicide watch =

Monitoring process to ensure that a person cannot attempt suicide

Suicide watch (sometimes shortened to SW) is an intensive monitoring process used to ensure that any person cannot attempt suicide. Usually the term is used in reference to inmates or patients in a prison, hospital, psychiatric hospital or military base. People are placed on suicide watch when it is believed that they exhibit warning signs indicating that they may be at risk of committing bodily harm or purposefully killing themselves.

== In hospitals ==
In hospitals, the practice is sometimes referred to as constant visual observation (CO). CO is the practice of placing somebody, generally someone in a psychiatric inpatient unit, under the constant supervision of a healthcare worker. CO is widely used for potentially suicidal patients, but the evidence to support its effectiveness is weak. Concerns around the use of constant visual observation include paternalism, distrust and dislike by patients, job dissatisfaction amongst staff on CO, and the high cost of paying staff for long shifts.

== In correctional institutes ==
Various forms of suicide watch exist. These generally involve the subject being under continuous or very frequent watch of a guard, such as a prison officer, security officer or orderly, who will intervene if the subject attempts to harm themself.

=== Periodic ===
Periodic suicide watch, or more simply known as suicide watch, involves the subject being monitored through frequent periodic checks.

=== Intense ===
Intense suicide watch or observation involves the subject being observed continually by a person who may be employed in one of several possible capacities, sitting or standing in direct sight or arm's reach of the subject. This may be known as a 1 to 1.

== Conditions ==
People under suicide watch are put into an environment where it would be difficult for them to hurt themselves. In many cases, any dangerous items will be removed from the area, such as sharp objects and some furniture, or they may be placed in a special padded cell, which has nothing outcropping from the walls (e.g., a clothes hook or door closing bracket) to provide a place for a ligature to be attached, and with only a drain-grill on the floor. They may be stripped of anything with which they might hurt themselves or use as a noose, including belts, neckties, bras, shoes, shoelaces, socks, suspenders, glasses, necklaces, bed sheets and other items. They are only allowed small finger foods and no books. Large objects, such as pizza slices or crumpled pages of a book, could be used for suffocation. In extreme cases, the inmate may be undressed entirely.

In even more extreme cases, inmates may be placed in "therapeutic restraints", a four- or five-point restraint system. The inmate is placed on their back on a mattress. Their arms and legs are tied down and a belt is placed across the chest. In a five-point system, the head is also restrained. An inmate is allowed a range of movement every two hours, when one limb is released and they are allowed to move it for a short period. They are then restrained again, proceeding to the next limb. This process is repeated until all areas restrained have been moved. This process usually continues in eight-hour shifts, and the inmate has a face-to-face encounter with a mental health professional at least once in each eight-hour interval. This cannot continue for more than 16 consecutive hours. The inmate is continually watched by staff during this time.

In the most extreme cases of self-harm, only when all other avenues have not worked or are impracticable, "chemical restraint" drugs may be used to sedate the inmate. In order for a facility to administer a chemical restraint, it must have the approval/recommendation of a licensed mental health professional, the facility warden, and a court order.

== Controversies ==
Inmates are often placed naked in suicide cells, which are usually bare concrete, often without bedding (to prevent hanging by using bedsheets), and under frequent or continuous observation by guards. Unsanitary conditions are also common since toilet paper, underwear and tampons (all potential means of choking) are restricted. Being exposed without any way of covering oneself, coupled with being under constant observation, can aggravate mental distress, particularly if the inmate has been a victim of sexual violence. These harsh conditions came to light in 1998 when Elizabeth B., an inmate of Framingham prison in Massachusetts, USA, called a radio talk show to describe how she had been treated while on suicide watch:

I was ... put on eyeball status, stripped of belongings, clothing, placed naked in a room with nothing but a plastic mattress on the floor. Watched 24 hours a day by a man or woman. I was on my period but because of my status not allowed to have tampons or underwear. I was very humiliated, degraded. Being on eyeball status with male officers, my depression intensified. I didn't want to be violated any more than I already was, so I put the mattress up against the window. When I did that I was in violation because they couldn't see me. The door was forced open, I was physically restrained in four-point restraints - arms, legs spreadeagled, tied to the floor, naked, helmet on head, men and women in the room.

Being on a suicide watch does not guarantee a person will not kill themself. Ashley Smith, a female inmate at a facility in Canada, killed herself while under suicide watch in October 2007. The circumstances surrounding her death were the subject of the Ashley Smith inquest.

== See also ==
- 5150 (Involuntary psychiatric hold)
- Prisoner suicide
