= Ashley Smith inquest =

21st-century Canadian inquest into a death

The Ashley Smith inquest was a coroner's inquest into the death of Ashley Smith, a teenager who died by self-inflicted strangulation on 19 October 2007 while under suicide watch in custody at the Grand Valley Institution for Women in Ontario, Canada. Despite guards watching her on video monitors, Smith was able to strangle herself with a strip of cloth, and it was 45 minutes before guards or supervisors entered her cell and confirmed her death. The warden and deputy warden were fired after the incident; although the four guards and supervisors in immediate contact with Smith were initially charged with negligent homicide, those charges were withdrawn a year later. Smith's family brought a lawsuit against the Correctional Service of Canada (CSC) for negligence; this lawsuit was settled out of court in May 2011.

The CBC documentary news program The Fifth Estate produced two separate episodes on the life and death of Ashley Smith. The documentaries describe the circumstances leading up to her death, as well as some disagreement inside the Correctional Service of Canada. The Fifth Estate claims "Corrections Canada filed an unprecedented publication ban on all exhibits presented at the coroner's inquest into her death."

The inquest was frequently interrupted by multiple legal challenges and a change of coroner, before finally being terminated as a mistrial on 30 September 2011; a new inquest into Smith's death began on 19 September 2012. On 2 December 2013, the presiding coroner instructed the jury to begin their deliberations with respect to a verdict on Smith's death. On 19 December 2013, the coroner's jury returned a verdict of homicide in the case of Ashley Smith, and provided dozens of recommendations to the presiding judge.

== Early life ==
Ashley Smith
- Born: 29 January 1988; Moncton, New Brunswick, Canada
- Died: 19 October 2007 (aged 19); Grand Valley Institution for Women, Ontario, Canada
- Known for: Death by self-inflicted strangulation while on suicide watch

Ashley Smith (born 29 January 1988, New Brunswick, Canada) was adopted when she was five days old. According to her adoptive parents, Coralee Cusack-Smith and Herbert Gorber, she had a normal happy childhood in Moncton, New Brunswick. Between the ages of 13 and 14, her parents noted distinct behavioural changes in the child; by age 15 she had been before juvenile court 14 times for various minor offences such as throwing crabapples at a mailman, trespassing, and causing a disturbance. In March 2002, Smith was assessed by a psychologist who found no evidence of mental illness. However, her behavioural problems continued and she was suspended from school multiple times in the fall of 2002. In March 2003, after multiple court appearances, Smith was admitted to the Pierre Caissie Centre for assessment. She was diagnosed with ADHD, learning disorder, borderline personality disorder and narcissistic personality traits. She was discharged several days early from the Centre for unruly and disruptive behaviour and returned to the New Brunswick Youth Centre (NBYC). Smith was remanded to the NBYC multiple times over the next three years; during this time she was involved in more than 800 reported incidents and at least 150 attempts to physically harm herself.

On 29 January 2006, Ashley Smith turned 18; on 29 July a motion was made under the Youth Criminal Justice Act to transfer her to an adult facility. Smith hired a lawyer to fight the transfer but was unsuccessful. On 5 October 2006, Smith was transferred to the Saint John Regional Correctional Centre (SJRCC). Due to her behaviour at SJRCC, Smith spent most of her time there in isolation; she was tasered twice and pepper-sprayed once. On 31 October 2006, Smith was transferred to the Nova Institution for Women in Nova Scotia (a federal institution). Through 2007, Smith was transferred a total of 17 times among the following eight institutions during 11 months in federal custody:

- Nova Institution for Women, Truro, Nova Scotia
- Joliette Institution, Joliette, Quebec
- Regional Psychiatric Centre, Prairies, Saskatoon, Saskatchewan
- L'Institut Philippe-Pinel de Montréal, Montreal, Quebec
- Grand Valley Institution for Women, Kitchener, Ontario
- Grand River Hospital, Kitchener, Ontario
- Regional Mental Health Care St. Thomas, St. Thomas, Ontario
- Central Nova Correctional Facility, Dartmouth, Nova Scotia

== Death ==
While at Grand Valley Institution for Women in Kitchener, Ontario, on 16 October 2007, Smith requested to be transferred to a psychiatric facility; she was placed on a formal suicide watch on 18 October. In the early hours of 19 October, Smith was videotaped placing a ligature around her neck, an act of self-harm she had committed several times before. Guards did not enter her cell to intervene, and 45 minutes passed before she was examined and pronounced dead.

On 25 October 2007, three guards and a supervisor at the Grand Valley Institution for Women were charged with criminal negligence causing death in relation to Smith's suicide; the warden and deputy warden were fired, but warden Cindy Berry after almost a year was quietly rehired. The criminal charges against her subordinates were later dropped. No charges were ever brought against the warden or deputy warden. On 8 October 2009, Smith's family launched a wrongful death lawsuit against the Correctional Service of Canada, demanding CA$11 million in damages; the suit was eventually settled out of court in May 2011 for an undisclosed amount.

After Ashley Smith's death, her mother became an advocate for changes to the Canadian prison system to prevent similar tragedies in other families. She collaborated with Canadian senator Kim Pate, also a prisoners' rights advocate.

== Documentaries by The Fifth Estate ==
=== Out of Control ===
On 8 January 2010, CBC News Network's The Fifth Estate broadcast a documentary about the case titled Out of Control. In the documentary, reporter Hana Gartner describes Smith as a fourteen-year-old placed in a youth facility for one month in 2003 after throwing crabapples at a mailman. Smith was placed in solitary confinement after disruptive behaviour on her first day. Her initial one-month sentence would last almost four years, entirely in isolation, until her death in 2007. Often violent and unpredictable, her behaviours and the force required to intervene were always filmed and recorded, then listed on daily logs. Behaviour that Smith exhibited included many attempts at choking herself into unconsciousness; guards responding were often attacked by Smith, sometimes with weapons she had manufactured and concealed.

The frequent "use of force" reports required to document responses became a source of concern for facility officials. According to an internal document obtained and partially read aloud by Gartner, eventually Corrections Canada administrators instructed guards and supervisors not to respond to self-strangling attempts by Smith, "to ignore her, even if she was choking herself". CSC officials repeatedly transferred her to other facilities, preventing the implementation of a Canadian law requiring mandatory review of prisoners kept in isolation for more than sixty days.

After Smith's death, and the firing of both wardens and four directly involved officers, the four officers were charged with negligent homicide. The spokesman for the union for the four guards alleged the guards were "scapegoated" by senior management: "There was daily direction given right from the highest levels of management all the way to the front line staff, and we're not talking once or twice, we're talking everyday, repeatedly, 'you are not to go in the cell; this is your orders' [sic]". The union's spokesman relayed his organization's stance that the guards' prosecution was part of a cover-up by those in CSC management.

At the conclusion of the documentary, Smith's mother raised the question of responsibility: "Who gave that order, Hana?... Who gave the order to keep that child, we're talking about a child in the youth centre, segregated that length of time? Who gave the order 'don't intervene' if she's still breathing?" The four guards saw the charges against them dropped and were reinstated to their positions; they declined to talk to The Fifth Estate. The Corrections Service of Canada viewed the case as closed, and while the current minister did talk to Hana Gartner, CSC refused any interviews with the reporter, while a lawsuit was pending.

=== Behind the Wall ===
A second documentary titled Behind the Wall was first broadcast on 12 November 2010, and looks at the case of another similar detainee, while probing more closely at a four-month period in Ashley Smith's detention while at the Regional Psychiatric Centre, Prairies, Saskatoon. The program also depicts the two-year conflict between The Fifth Estate and CSC to broadcast more footage of the last days of Ashley Smith.

== Inquests ==
=== 2011 inquest ===
The first coroner's inquest into Smith's death began in May 2011. The inquest, initially led by deputy chief coroner Bonita Porter, was controversial; it was originally scheduled to begin in November 2010, but was delayed by a legal challenge by the Smith family. As a result of this challenge, the scope of the inquest was broadened to cover the entire 11-month period of Smith's incarceration under the federal Correctional Service. Further, a panel of judges with the Ontario Divisional Court ruled in May 2011 that Porter should not have excluded video evidence of Smith's forced sedation at the Joliette Institution in Quebec. On 21 June 2011, the proceedings of the inquest were suspended until 12 September; the reason for the delay was apparently to allow the proceedings to be webcast. In late June 2011, Porter was replaced as the presiding coroner, apparently due to her impending retirement in November 2011; the replacement presiding coroner was John R. Carlisle. The sudden and unexpected replacement led Smith's family to formally accuse the chief coroner of interfering in the inquest with no legal basis; Porter had apparently indicated that she would deliver three outstanding rulings in July, days before the announcement of her replacement. The inquest resumed briefly on 12 September, only to be suspended once again until 19 September, when the Smith family lawyer challenged the right of the new coroner to continue the inquest, and called for a mistrial. On 30 September 2011, the Ontario Coroner's Office formally terminated the inquest and dismissed the jury.

=== 2012 inquest ===
A second inquest began on 20 September 2012, opening with a hearing for those who wished to apply for standing at the proceedings. John Carlisle continued as presiding coroner, and in a lengthy ruling released on 25 September 2012, granted standing at the inquest to Smith's family, prison authorities, inmate advocacy groups, and a group of current and former mental-health patients known as the Empowerment Council. Carlisle further widened the scope of the inquest to include the effects of long-term solitary confinement, repeated transfers between institutions across the country, the role of mental health care and the management of Smith as an inmate by prison authorities, and all youth-custody issues arising from Smith's death.

Motion hearings for the inquest took place on 23–24 October 2012. Lawyers for the Correctional Service of Canada filed a motion to seal video materials and documents related to Smith's forced restraint and sedation while incarcerated in the Quebec prison facility; when the motion was denied by the presiding coroner, the government lawyers requested a temporary injunction to stay the inquest proceedings through Ontario Divisional Court. This motion was also denied and the video and documentary material were made available to the inquest, which subsequently proceeded as planned.

Additionally, three doctors involved in Smith's treatment during her incarceration challenged the expansion of the inquest to include events that took place outside the province of Ontario. Presiding Coroner Carlisle dismissed this motion at the same time as that of the Correctional Service of Canada motion, but subsequently granted the out-of-province doctors standing at the inquest when they agreed to testify voluntarily at the inquest proceedings.

Formal hearings for the inquest began on 13 January 2013, and were expected to last between six months and a year. The jury of five women were expected to be presented with over 100 witnesses and 8,000 documents in the course of the inquest.

On 22 January 2013, the jurors were shown prison guard Valentino Burnett's 45-minute video of Smith tying her neck, asphyxiating, and the guards' discovery and response. When questioned about their response, Valentino admitted that "in a perfect world", the guards would have intervened to save Smith.

On 2 December 2013, after more than a year of testimony and over 12,000 pages of evidence, the presiding coroner instructed the jury to begin their deliberations, and requested they come back with a verdict in Smith's death and recommendations on means to prevent a recurrence of such an event.

On 19 December 2013, the coroner's jury returned a verdict of homicide in the Ashley Smith case, indicating the actions of others contributed to her death but stopping short of a finding of criminal or civil liability. The jury additionally provided 104 recommendations to the presiding coroner, most of which were intended to suggest ways in which the Canadian Correctional System could better serve female inmates and inmates with mental illness. The jury specifically recommended that indefinite solitary confinement should be banned.

== Political impact ==
In November 2012, the Ashley Smith case began to have a visible impact on Canadian federal politics. After the public release of video material depicting Smith's treatment while incarcerated, interim leader of the federal Liberal Party Bob Rae raised the matter in Parliament during Question Period, asking why the government was attempting to restrict the scope of the inquiry through the Corrections Canada legal challenge. Prime Minister Stephen Harper responded that the government would not interfere with the inquest, and Public Safety Minister Vic Toews later indicated that Corrections Canada officials had been directed to cooperate with the inquest. However, Toews later appeared to contradict the official government stance and drew significant criticism from the opposition Liberal and NDP Members of Parliament when he suggested that Smith was "not the victim" in the case. On 8 November, Rae called for a formal public inquiry into Smith's treatment while incarcerated, and additionally into the treatment of mentally ill offenders by the Canadian prison system, after concluding publicly that the government would not release all the information it held relating to the Smith case.

Subsequent to the release of the inquest verdict on 19 December 2013, the current Minister of Public Safety, Steven Blaney, stated that he had asked his officials to carefully review the jury's recommendations.
