= Grand Valley Institution for Women =

Women's prison

- Interactive map of Grand Valley Institution for Women
- Location: Kitchener, Ontario; 43.4010°N 80.4420°W
- Security class: Multi-level
- Capacity: 171 approx.
- Opened: 1997
- Managed by: Correctional Service of Canada

Notable prisoners
- Terri-Lynne McClintic, Jennifer Pan, Ashley Smith, Elizabeth Wettlaufer

Grand Valley Institution for Women (GVI; French: Établissement pour femmes Grand Valley) is a women's prison in Kitchener, Ontario, operated by the Correctional Service of Canada (CSC).

In Canada, all offenders sentenced to prison terms of greater than two years serve their time in a federal institution operated by the CSC. The Grand Valley Institution, which had a reported capacity of approximately 130 women as of April 2010, is the only federal women's prison in Ontario.

== History ==
The prison opened in 1997. Previously Prison for Women in Kingston, Ontario was the only federal women's prison in Canada. Area neighbors initially opposed the development due to its location in Kitchener and its proximity to residential areas, but as of 2017 the opposition had died down. The housing for lower security prisoners was built first, and the housing for maximum security prisoners was built later.

On October 19, 2007, prison officials at the Grand Valley Institution observed the death of 19-year-old inmate Ashley Smith causing much controversy and legal inquest.

== Composition ==
The majority of the prisoners live in detached buildings, or "cottages".

The prison has a secure unit for prisoners temporarily held in administrative segregation, who do not communicate with other prisoners, and those classified as maximum security prisoners, who are held in "pods" which each have five cells.

Initially the prison had a white picket fence as a boundary, but a chain-link barbed wire fence later replaced it.

== Demographics ==
Circa 2017 the prison had 168 prisoners, with most of them each having four or fewer years remaining of their sentences, and 13 of them being classified as maximum security. Four of them had children accompanying them.

Circa 2017 the prison had 208 employees.

== Programs ==
The program in which mothers have children with them in prison had been active since 2016 and is active as of 2017. Ryan Flanagan of CTV stated that previously the program was in "fits and starts".

== Notable prisoners ==
- Elva Bottineau
- Terri-Lynne McClintic
- Jennifer Pan
- Ashley Smith
- Elizabeth Wettlaufer
