= Louise Arbour =

Governor General of Canada since 2026

Her Excellency the Right Honourable Louise Arbour CC CMM COM GOQ CD
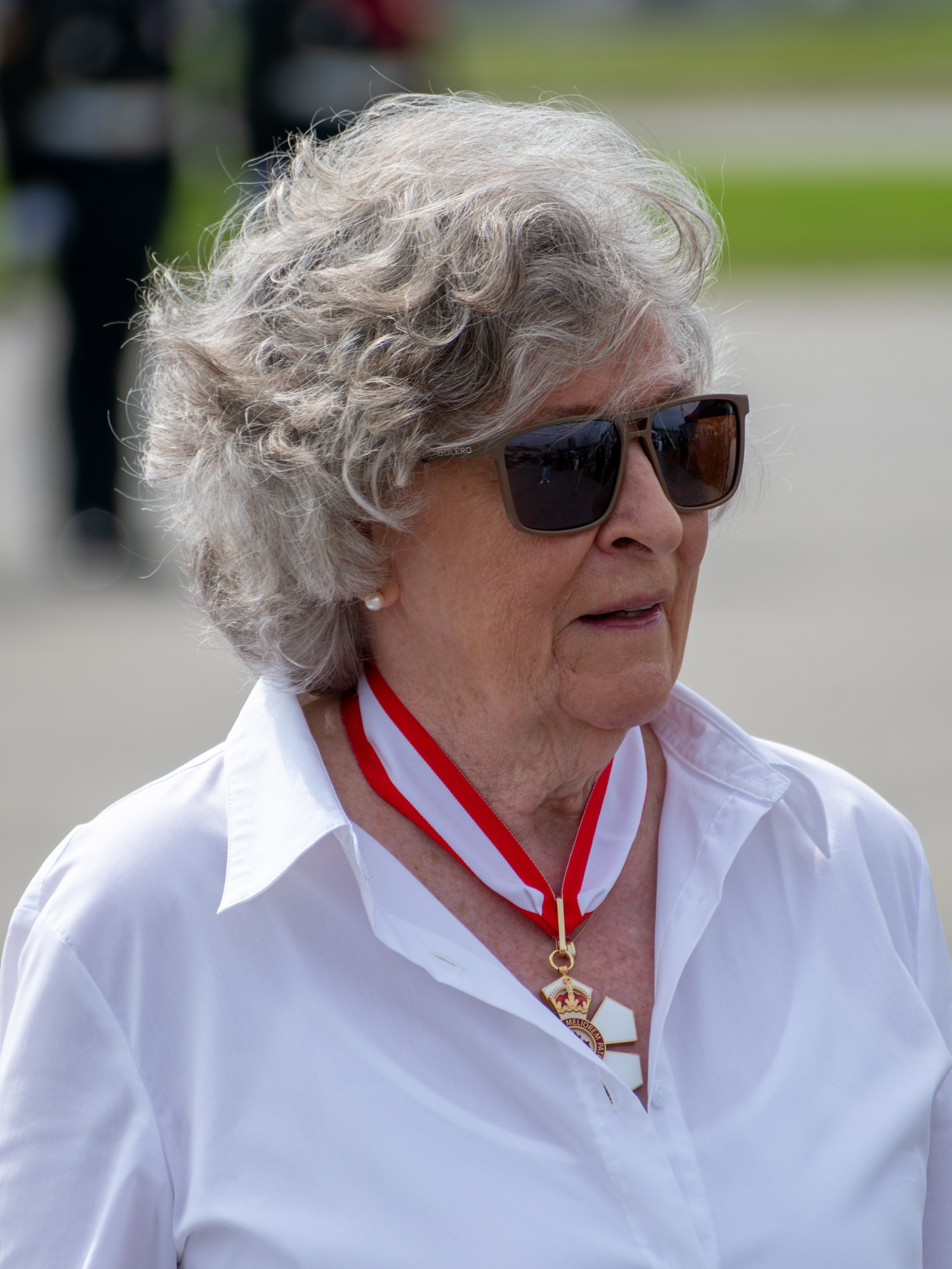
- Arbour in 2026

31st Governor General of Canada
- Incumbent
- Assumed office June 8, 2026
- Monarch: Charles III
- Prime Minister: Mark Carney
- Preceded by: Mary Simon

United Nations Special Representative for International Migration
- In office March 1, 2017 – December 31, 2018
- Secretary General: António Guterres
- Preceded by: Peter Sutherland
- Succeeded by: Position abolished

United Nations High Commissioner for Human Rights
- In office June 30, 2004 – August 31, 2008
- Secretary General: Kofi Annan; Ban Ki-moon
- Preceded by: Sérgio Vieira de Mello
- Succeeded by: Navi Pillay

Puisne Justice of the Supreme Court of Canada
- In office September 15, 1999 – June 28, 2004
- Nominated by: Jean Chrétien
- Preceded by: Peter Cory
- Succeeded by: Louise Charron

Chief Prosecutor of the International Criminal Tribunals for Rwanda and the former Yugoslavia
- In office October 1, 1996 – September 15, 1999
- Secretary General: Boutros Boutros Ghali; Kofi Annan
- Preceded by: Richard Goldstone
- Succeeded by: Carla Del Ponte

Personal details
- Born: February 10, 1947 (age 79) Montreal, Quebec, Canada
- Domestic partner: Larry Taman (ca. 1969–1996)
- Children: 3
- Education: Université de Montréal (BA, LLL); University of Ottawa
- Occupation: Lawyer; prosecutor; jurist; civil servant; human rights advocate; diplomat
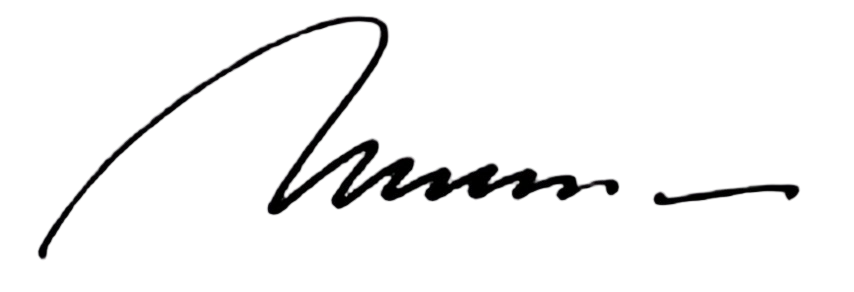
- Signature

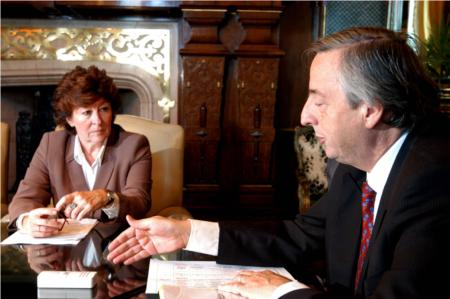
Arbour, while serving as UN Human Rights Commissioner, sits with Argentinian President Néstor Kirchner, 2005

Louise Arbour (French pronunciation: [lwiz aʁbuʁ]; born February 10, 1947) is a Canadian jurist who has served as the 31st governor general of Canada since 2026.

Born in Montreal, she attended the Université de Montréal and earned a Licentiate of Laws degree. Arbour has served as the UN High Commissioner for Human Rights, a justice of the Supreme Court of Canada and the Court of Appeal for Ontario and a chief prosecutor of the International Criminal Tribunals for the former Yugoslavia and Rwanda. From 2009 until 2014, she served as president and CEO of the International Crisis Group. She was the first prosecutor to indict a sitting head of state, Yugoslavian president Slobodan Milošević, and the first to prosecute sexual assault as a crime against humanity. From March 2017 to December 2018, she was the special representative of the United Nations Secretary-General for international migration. After leaving office, she continued her private law practice in Montreal.

Arbour was appointed Governor General on June 8, 2026, by King Charles III under the recommendation of Prime Minister Mark Carney. Arbour is the oldest person to hold the office in Canadian history.

== Early life and education ==
Louise Arbour was born in Montreal, Quebec, to Bernard and Rose (née Ravary) Arbour, the owners of a hotel chain. She attended convent school, during which time her parents divorced. As editor of the school magazine, she earned a reputation for irreverence.

In 1967, she graduated from Collège Regina Assumpta and proceeded to the Université de Montréal where she completed an LL.B. with distinction in 1970. She was a law clerk for Justice Louis-Philippe Pigeon of the Supreme Court of Canada from 1971 to 1972 while completing graduate studies at the Faculty of Law (Civil Section) of the University of Ottawa. In a 2014 interview, Arbour named the move from Quebec to Ontario as the "biggest hurdle [she] had to overcome to succeed in [her] career," as her entire education had been in French. She was called to the Bar of Quebec in 1971 and the Law Society of Upper Canada in 1977.

== Career ==
=== Legal career ===
==== In Canada ====
From 1972 to 1973, Arbour served as a research officer for the Law Reform Commission of Canada. She then taught at Osgoode Hall Law School, York University, first as a Lecturer (1974), then as Assistant Professor (1975), Associate Professor (1977–1987), and finally as Associate Professor and Associate Dean (1987). She was vice-president of the Canadian Civil Liberties Association until her appointment to the Supreme Court of Ontario (High Court of Justice) in 1987 and to the Court of Appeal for Ontario in 1990. In 1995, Arbour was appointed as President of a Commission of Inquiry, under the Inquiries Act, for the purpose of investigating and reporting on events at the Prison for Women in Kingston, Ontario, following allegations by prisoners of abuse. The inquiry resulted in the publication of the Arbour Report.

==== The Hague ====
In 1996, at Richard Goldstone's recommendation, Arbour was appointed as his replacement as Chief Prosecutor of the International Criminal Tribunal for Rwanda in Arusha, and of the International Criminal Tribunal for the former Yugoslavia (ICTY) in The Hague. She helped convict Jean-Paul Akayesu of genocide, the first such conviction since 1948 Genocide Convention. She also indicted then-Serbian President Slobodan Milošević for war crimes, the first time a serving head of State was called to account before an international court. Arbour declined to investigate any potential NATO war crimes, stating that "I accept the assurances given by NATO leaders that they intend to conduct their operations in the Federal Republic of Yugoslavia in full compliance with international humanitarian law".

==== Supreme Court of Canada ====
In 1999, Prime Minister Jean Chrétien appointed Arbour to the Supreme Court of Canada on May 26, just one day before the publication of the indictment of Milosevic by the International Criminal Tribunal for the former Yugoslavia (ICTY). In 2004, Arbour retired from the Supreme Court of Canada, having served for just under five years. During her time on the Court, she wrote 68 reasons.

=== United Nations and later career ===
After leaving the Supreme Court of Canada, Arbour became the United Nations High Commissioner of Human Rights. She criticized a number of countries for their human rights records. In 2008, she stepped down after serving one four-year term. In 2014, after leaving the International Crisis Group as president and CEO since 2009, Arbour began working for Borden Ladner Gervais as a senior counsel. Arbour was also a member of the Global Commission on Drug Policy, the International Commission Against the Death Penalty, and the Whitney R. Harris World Law Institute's International Council.

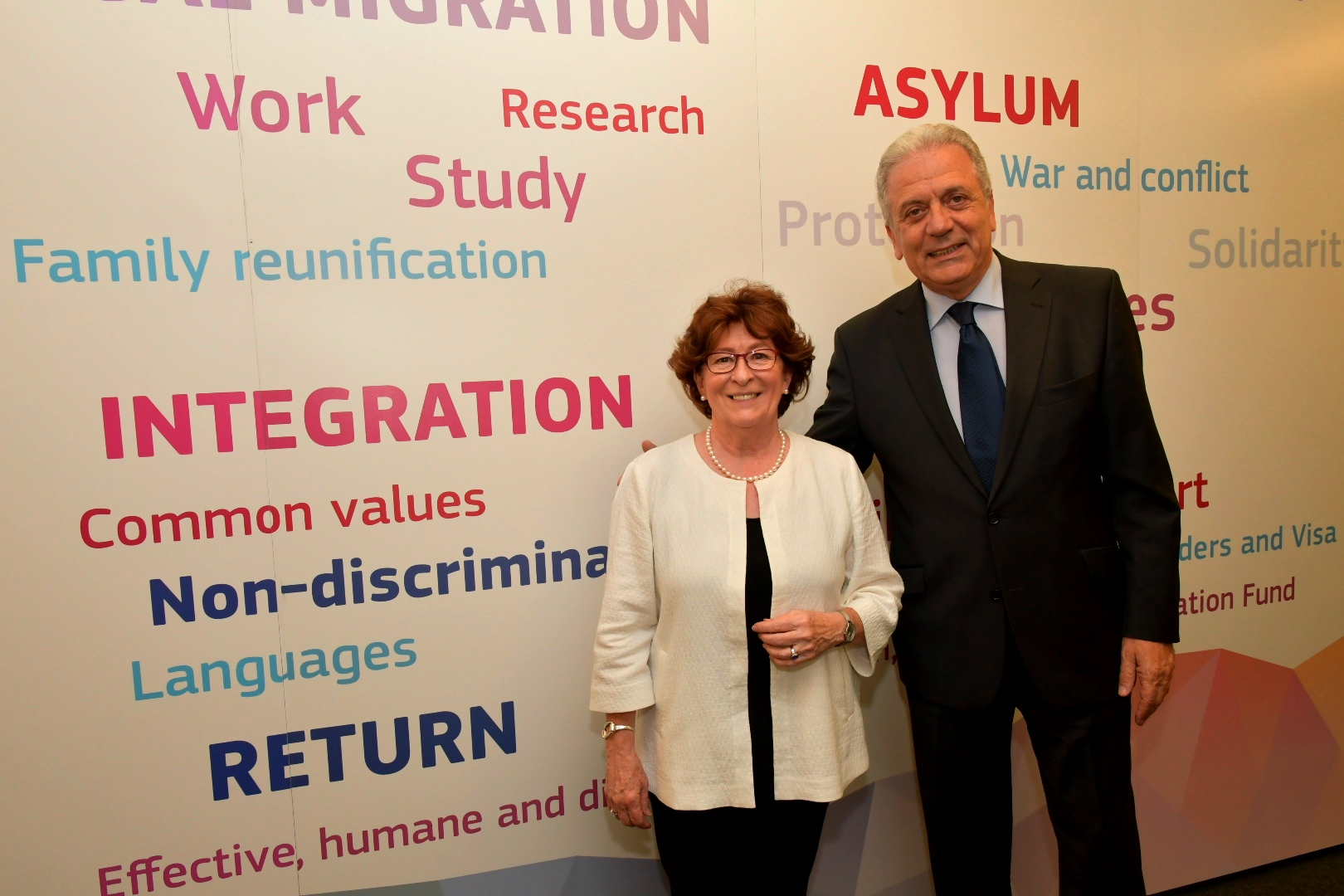
Arbour with Dimitris Avramopoulos, in 2017

On March 9, 2017, Arbour was appointed by the U.N. Secretary-General, António Guterres, to be his Special Representative for International Migration. In 2018, she described anti-migration sentiment in Western countries as "completely self-defeating." In April 2021, Canadian Minister of National Defence Harjit Sajjan appointed Arbour to lead an independent review of the military’s handling of sexual assault, harassment and other misconduct. In May 2022, she delivered her final report, which included 48 recommendations, including a proposal for civilian courts to handle sexual assault allegations involving members of the military.

== Governor General of Canada ==
On May 5, 2026, Prime Minister Mark Carney announced that King Charles III had approved Arbour's appointment as the 31st governor general of Canada, succeeding Mary Simon. Before being installed on June 8, Arbour was received by Charles III in London. During this audience, she was invested as an extraordinary Commander of the Order of Military Merit, and Commander of the Order of Merit of the Police Forces, as is customary for governors general, who are ex officio the chancellor of the respective orders. Arbour is the oldest person to hold the office in Canadian history. During her installation ceremony, Arbour warned Canadians to be "vigilant" amid the rise of artificial intelligence (AI).

== Personal life ==
At the University of Ottawa, Arbour met her long-time common-law partner Larry Taman, with whom she lived for 27 years before separating after she moved to The Hague in 1996. Arbour had three children with Taman: Emilie, Patrick and Catherine. She also has grandchildren.

Arbour speaks both English and French fluently.

Her daughter, Emilie Taman, is a lawyer and politician affiliated with the New Democratic Party (NDP). Emilie was the NDP candidate for Ottawa—Vanier in the 2015 Canadian federal election and the 2017 Ottawa—Vanier federal by-election, and later contested Ottawa Centre in the 2019 Canadian federal election.

Arbour has described herself as a supporter of international justice, human rights and multilateral cooperation, themes that have shaped both her judicial and diplomatic career.

== In the media ==
Arbour has published works on criminal procedure and criminal law in both French and English. At various times, she has served as an editor for the Criminal Reports, the Canadian Rights Reporter, and the Osgoode Hall Law Journal.

On April 1, 2016, Arbour participated in a Munk Debate concerning what was being called a global refugee crisis at the time, arguing alongside historian Simon Schama in favour of the resolution that Western nations have a moral imperative to accept a large influx of refugees. Beginning the evening with 77 percent of the audience supporting their side, Arbour and Schama lost the debate to opponents Mark Steyn and Nigel Farage, who swung 22 percent of the audience vote against the resolution by the end of the event.

== Awards and recognition ==
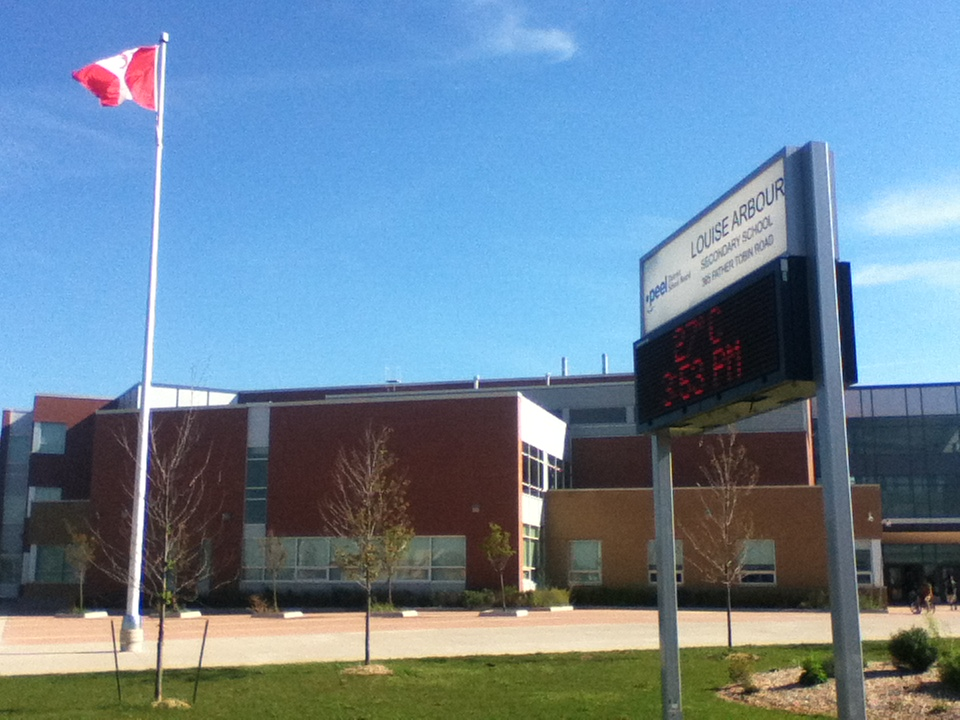
Exterior of Louise Arbour Secondary School in Brampton

In 2005, Arbour was awarded the Thomas J. Dodd Prize in International Justice and Human Rights, along with Justice Richard Goldstone, in recognition of her work on the International Criminal Tribunals for the former Yugoslavia and Rwanda. She was the subject of a 2005 fact-based Canadian-German made-for-television movie, Hunt for Justice, which follows her quest to indict Bosnian Serb war criminals. Arbour was played by Canadian actress Wendy Crewson. In 2016, she was awarded the Tang Prize in rule of law for her contributions to international criminal justice and the protection of human rights. She has multiple schools named after her, including Louise Arbour Secondary School in Brampton, Ontario.

Arbour was made a Companion of the Order of Canada in 2007 "for her contributions to the Canadian justice system and for her dedication to the advancement of human rights throughout the world". She was made a Grand Officer of the National Order of Quebec in 2009. She was made a Commander of the National Order of the Legion of Honour in 2011. In 2014, she was inducted into Canada's Walk of Fame.

Arbour has been awarded numerous honorary degrees, including Doctor of Civil Laws from the University of Western Ontario in June 2000, Doctor of Humane Letters from Mount Saint Vincent University in May 2001, and Doctor of Laws degrees from the University of New Brunswick in 1999, from the University of British Columbia in November 2001, from Concordia University in 2001, the University of Waterloo in October 2006, in June 2009 from the University of Alberta and University of Guelph, from Simon Fraser University in October 2009, and from Vancouver Island University in January 2020.

In January 2023, Arbour was awarded the 2023 Sandra Day O'Connor Justice Prize from Arizona State University, a lifetime achievement award for human rights work as well as upholding the rule of law and judicial independence.

== Honours ==
Viceregal styles of Louise Arbour (2026–present)
- Reference style: Her Excellency the Right Honourable; Son Excellence la très honorable
- Spoken style: Your Excellency; Votre Excellence

Ribbon bars of Louise Arbour

Appointments and awards
Honour	Date	Citation
	Order of Canada	Extraordinary Companion of the Order in 2026; Companion to the Order in 2007
	Order of Military Merit	Extraordinary Commander of the Order in 2026
	Order of Merit of the Police Forces	Commander of the Order in 2026
	The Most Venerable Order of the Hospital of St. John of Jerusalem	Dame of Justice and Prior of the Order in 2026
	National Order of Quebec	Grand Officer of the Order in 2009
	125th anniversary of the Confederation of Canada Medal	1992
	Queen Elizabeth II Golden Jubilee Medal	2002
	Queen Elizabeth II Diamond Jubilee Medal	2012
	King Charles III Coronation Medal	2025
	Canadian Forces' Decoration	2026
	Royal Order of Civil Merit (Spain)	Grand Cross in 2009
	Order of National Merit (Colombia)	Grand Cross in 2010
	Order of the Crown (Belgium)	Grand Officier in 2015
	National Order of the Legion of Honour (France)	Commandeur in 2010
	Order of Montréal	Commandeure in 2023

=== Honorary military appointments ===
Military command	Date	Regiment	Position
(Canada) Canadian Army	2026 – present	The Governor General's Horse Guards	Colonel of the Regiment
(Canada) Canadian Army	2026 – present	Governor General's Foot Guards	Colonel of the Regiment
(Canada) Canadian Army	2026 – present	The Canadian Grenadier Guards	Colonel of the Regiment

== Footnotes ==
Diplomatic posts
Preceded by Sérgio Vieira de Mello	United Nations High Commissioner for Human Rights; 2004–2008	Succeeded by Navi Pillay
Government offices
Preceded by Mary Simon	Governor General of Canada; 2026–present	Incumbent
Order of precedence
Preceded by Charles III as King of Canada	Order of precedence of Canada; As Governor General	Succeeded by Mark Carney as Prime Minister
