= Joliette Institution for Women =

Prison in Quebec, Canada

Coordinates: 46.0325°N 73.4150°W

Joliette Institution for Women (French: Établissement Joliette pour femmes) is a prison for women in Joliette, Quebec, northeast of Montreal, Quebec, Canada. It is operated by the Correctional Service of Canada (CSC) and has a capacity of 132 prisoners.

Built in 1997, it originally had a capacity for 80 prisoners; it is one of several prisons that replaced the Kingston Prison for Women.

== Composition ==
The prison has an on-site day care, and there is a parenting skills program in which prisoners may babysit children.

The prison has ten two-story cottage units, with each one housing eight women.

In April 2003, a maximum security wing opened, costing $4-million. There is also a ten-person maximum security unit that was scheduled to be completed in 2013–2014.

== Notable prisoners ==
- Karla Homolka – Transferred to Joliette in 1997. Few area residents knew that she was located there nor her status. After her lifestyle at Joliette was revealed to the media, she was transferred to the Regional Reception Centre in March 2001. In 2003, she was scheduled to be moved back to Joliette after its maximum security wing opened.
