= Nova Institution for Women =

Prison in Truro, Nova Scotia, Canada

- Interactive map of Nova Institution for Women
- Location: 180 James Street Truro, Nova Scotia B2N 6R8; 45.3495°N 63.2999°W
- Security class: multi
- Opened: 1995
- Managed by: Correctional Service Canada
- Warden: Adele MacInnis-Meagher

Nova Institution for Women (French: Établissement Nova pour femmes) is a Canadian federal prison for women in Truro, Nova Scotia. The facility, which handles different levels of offenders, can accommodate up to 70 inmates. Nova Institution opened in 1995. The maximum security unit opened in 2002 or 2003.

Main programs at the institution include:

- Living skills
- Sex offender programs
- Substance abuse treatment

The Correctional Service of Canada (CSC) is the federal government agency responsible for administering sentences of a term of two years or more.

== Ashley Smith ==
Ashley Smith, a prisoner who later died after an apparent suicide attempt, was held at several CSC institutions including Nova Institution.
