= 73rd Battalion (Royal Highlanders of Canada), CEF =

73rd Battalion (Royal Highlanders of Canada)
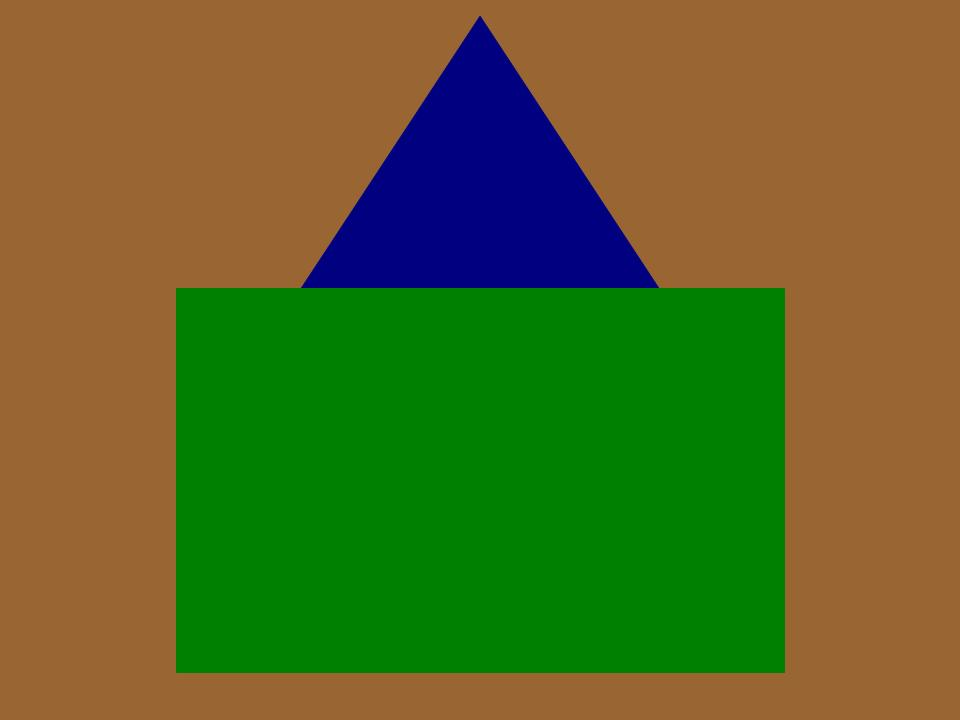
- Unit Patch
- Active: 10 July 1915–19 April 1917
- Country: Canada
- Branch: 4th Canadian Division
- Type: Highland regiment
- Role: Infantry
- Size: Battalion
- Part of: Canadian Expeditionary Force
- Motto: Nemo Me Impune Lacessit (No one shall touch me with impunity)
- March: Quick - Hielan' Laddie; Slow - The Red Hackle
- Engagements: World War I

Commanders
- First Officer Commanding: Lt-Col Peers Davidson ( _ )
- Regimental Sergeant Major: Sgt-Major _ ( _ )

Insignia
- Hackle: Red

The 73rd Battalion (Royal Highlanders of Canada), CEF was an infantry battalion of the Canadian Expeditionary Force during the Great War. The 73rd Battalion (Royal Highlanders of Canada) organized in June 1915, initially commanded by Lieutenant-Colonel Peers Davidson, was placed on 'Active Service' as an 'Overseas Battalion', on 10 July 1915, as authorized in Militia General Orders.

== History ==
=== Early days ===
The 73rd Battalion was mobilized in Montreal, with recruiting beginning on 3 September 1915, in Montreal and in parts of Eastern Ontario and Quebec. After initial training in Valcartier and wintering in Montreal, it was deemed ready for overseas in spring 1916. The Battalion embarked at Halifax, NS on 31 March 1916, aboard RMS ADRIATIC, disembarking in Liverpool on 9 April 1916, with a strength of 36 officers and 1033 other ranks.

Facing initially an uncertain future, on 5 May 1916, it was advised of assignment to 12th Canadian Infantry Brigade. After extended training in England, and losing a replacement draft of 250 men to the 13th Bn, the Battalion arrived at Le Havre, France on 13 August 1916, on HMTS Copenhagen, becoming part of the new 4th Canadian Division. The Battalion's orientation to Belgium and Flanders began, doing rotating tours or brigade reserve duties, first in Ypres, in August 1916, and through September, to the south, in Kemmel.

=== The Somme 1916 and The March Raid 1917 ===
Then moving, in October, for training prior to operations during The Third Battle of The Somme in the Battle of Ancre Heights, and at the Battle of Ancre, into November 1916, it conducted four tours, at Regina Trench and into Desire, Sugar, and Switch Trenches.

In December 1916, it was to move to the Arras sector, finding itself at Vimy, first as 4th Division Reserve before engagements in January / February 1917, with tours in and out on four or five day rotations. After time, also as 12th Bde Reserve, it participated in the March Raid on the 1st and followed up with two tours in The Zouave Valley.

=== Vimy Ridge 1917 ===
The Battalion's status as being sustainable first came into question in February 1917, as the England-based 20th Canadian Reserve Battalion noted fewer replacements coming through from their 1st Depot Battalion in Canada. In Montreal, through Militia District No. 4, the 1st Quebec Regiment, then having to sustain eight infantry CEF battalions was running out of volunteers, and The 73rd became the subject of discussion as a source of replacements, for two earlier recruited Montreal Highland service units: The 13th and The 42nd Battalions (RHC).

Fully engaged, in the line, below Vimy Ridge, on April 4, it moved to a position on the 1st CA Corps Left Flank, just west of Givenchy-en-Gohelle, entering assigned tunnels and into the Lime Street trenches, on the April 7th. Following the mine explosions at Gunner and Kennedy Craters, it assaulted onto the lower left slope of Hill 145, on the 9th, achieving its assigned objectives, moving forward, it fought off a counterattack, on April 11. After supporting 10th Brigade's assault north onto The Pimple, on the 12th and 13th, it was relieved on 13 April 1917, by the 85th Battalion.

=== Relieved and dissolved ===
Being seen as a low priority for Highlander replacements, and having suffered noted casualties, previously in the gas blow-back of The March Raid (27 Killed, 161 Casualties), and the Battle of Vimy Ridge in the assault onto Hill 145 (31 Killed, 189 Wounded), it was withdrawn from battle and ordered to dissolve on 16 April 1917. Now commanded by Lieutenant-Colonel H.C. Sparling, DSO, the 73rd Battalion was disbanded, on 19 April 1917, broken up for reinforcements, they being absorbed largely by the 13th (RHC) Battalion and the 42nd (RHC) Battalion, as well as the affiliated units in the 12th Brigade, and the 85th (NSH) Battalion.

== Battle honours ==
The 73rd Battalion was awarded the following battle honours, perpetuated by: The Black Watch (Royal Highland Regiment) of Canada: SOMME 1916. Ancre Heights. ANCRE 1916. ARRAS 1917. VIMY 1917. FRANCE and FLANDERS 1916–17.

== See also ==
- List of infantry battalions in the Canadian Expeditionary Force

== Bibliography ==
- The 73rd Battalion: Royal Highlanders of Canada, 1915-1917 - The Official History of the 73rd Battalion, CEF. Col Paul P. Hutchison c1962 ISBN Ref 978-0-9782507-2-0 Bloomfield, ON: Museum Restoration Service, 1987.
- Canada's Black Watch: The First Hundred Years 1862–1962, (Colonel) Paul P. Hutchison, Montreal: The Black Watch (RHR) of Canada, 1987; Don Mills, ON, 1962.
