= Provincial correctional services in Canada =

Legal system divides Canada into federal and provincial/territorial jurisdictions

In Canada, the criminal legal system is divided into federal and provincial/territorial jurisdictions. Provincial/territorial correctional facilities hold people who have been sentenced to less than two years in custody and people being held on remand (waiting trial or sentencing). Federal Correctional Facilities, which are the responsibility of Correctional Service of Canada—is concerned with people who have been sentenced to two years or more in custody.

Provincial/territorial jurisdiction includes: remand for those with a custody sentence of less than two years; community sentences such as fines, community service, or probation; including pre-trial supervision, community and custody sentences, and Extrajudicial Sanctions Programs. Youth criminal legal facilities and sentencing are also provincial/territorial but are usually governed by the ministry responsible for child and youth services, rather than the body responsible for adult corrections.

Though immigration detention is facilitated by the Canada Border Services Agency, immigration detainees may also be kept in provincial/territorial facilities because either the federal Immigration Holding Centres (IHCs) are full, there is no IHC in their region, or the detainee's file has a link to criminality.

== Alberta ==
Corrections in Alberta are administered by the Correctional Services of the Ministry of Justice.

- Calgary Correctional Centre
- Calgary Remand Centre
- Edmonton Remand Centre — largest in Canada
- Fort Saskatchewan Correctional Centre
- Lethbridge Correctional Centre
- Medicine Hat Remand Centre
- Peace River Correctional Centre
- Red Deer Remand Centre
- Fort Saskatchewan Correctional Centre (3 camps)
  - Metis Nation Wilderness Camp
  - Alsike Minimum Security Camp (closed April 2009)
  - Fort McMurray Minimum Security Camp (closed)
- Kainai Community Correctional Centre

== British Columbia ==
Corrections in British Columbia are administered by B.C. Corrections under the Ministry of Public Safety and Solicitor General. As of April 2021, BC has 10 correctional centres throughout the province.

Name	Location	Security
Alouette Correctional Centre for Women	Maple Ridge	Multilevel
Ford Mountain Correctional Centre	Chilliwack	Medium/open custody
Fraser Regional Correctional Centre	Maple Ridge	Multilevel
Kamloops Regional Correctional Centre	Kamloops	Multilevel
Nanaimo Correctional Centre	Nanaimo	Medium/open custody
North Fraser Pretrial Centre	Port Coquitlam	Remand
Okanagan Correctional Centre	Oliver	Multilevel
Prince George Regional Correctional Centre	Prince George	Multilevel
Surrey Pretrial Services Centre	Surrey	Remand
Vancouver Island Regional Correctional Centre	Victoria	Multilevel

== Manitoba ==
Correctional services in Manitoba are administered by Manitoba Corrections, under the province's Department of Justice.

Name	Location	Security	Inmates
Agassiz Youth Centre (AYC)	Portage la Prairie	Multilevel	Youth males
Brandon Correctional Centre	Brandon	Medium	Adult males
Headingley Correctional Institution	MB Highway 1	Multilevel	Adult males
Manitoba Youth Centre (MYC)	Winnipeg	Multilevel	Youth males & females
Milner Ridge Correctional Centre	Agassiz Provincial Forest, Beausejour	Multilevel	Adult males
The Pas Correctional Centre	The Pas.	Multilevel	Adult males & females
Winnipeg Remand Centre	Downtown Winnipeg	Multilevel	Adult males & females
Women’s Correctional Centre	Headingley	Multilevel	Adult females

== New Brunswick ==
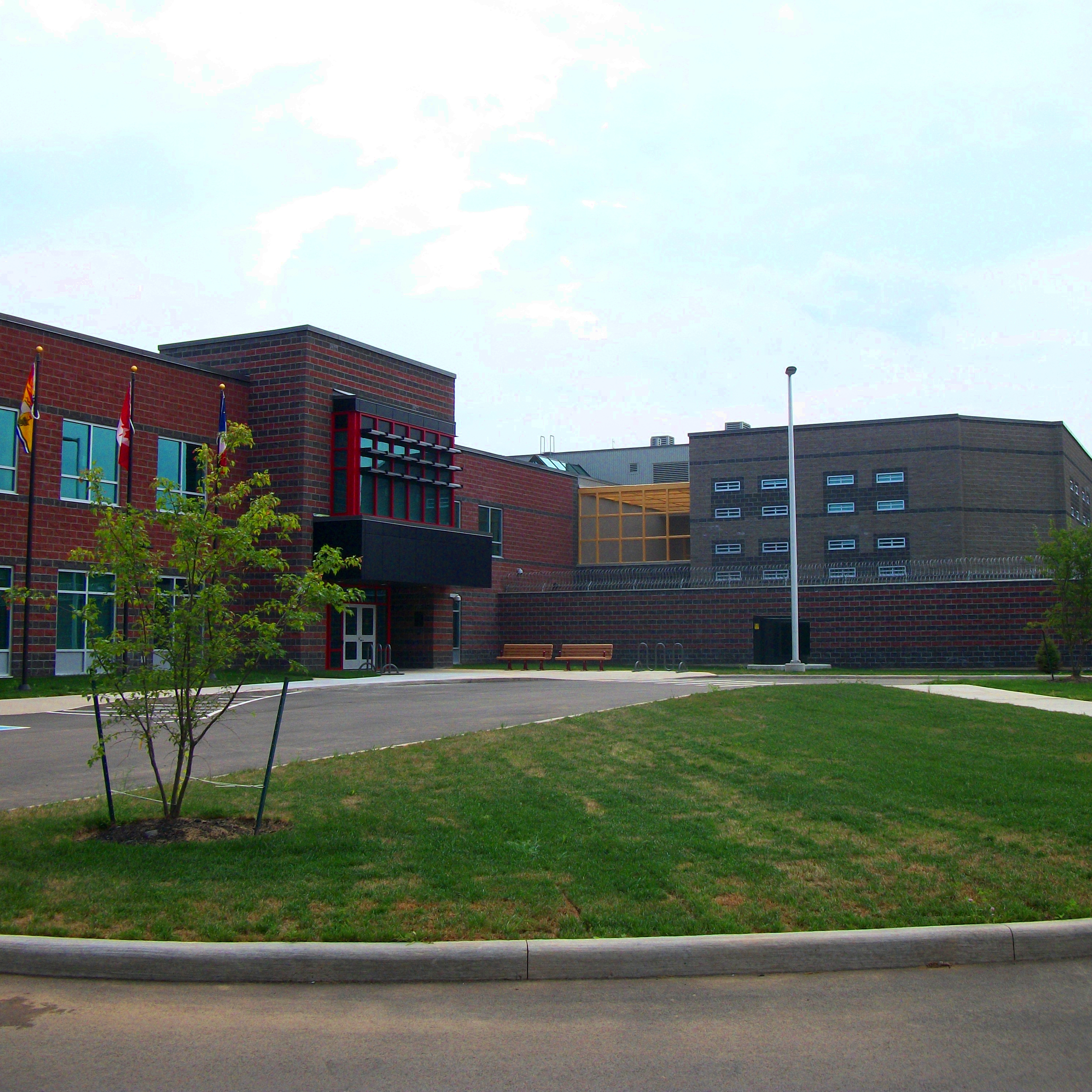
Southeast Regional Correctional Centre outside Shediac, New Brunswick

Correctional services in New Brunswick are administered by the Community & Correctional Services of Department of Justice and Public Safety.

Name	Location	Notes
Dalhousie Regional Correctional Centre	Dalhousie	established 2011; estimated cost: $16M
Island View Community Residential Centre	Fredericton	
Madawaska Regional Correctional Centre	Saint-Hilaire	established 1980
New Brunswick Women's Correctional Centre	Miramichi	established 2011
New Brunswick Youth Centre	Miramichi	established 1998
Saint John Regional Correctional Centre	Saint John	established 1981
Southeast Regional Correctional Centre	Shediac	established 2012; estimated cost: $40M
Bathurst Day Detention Centre	Bathurst	closed 2011
Moncton Detention Centre	Moncton	closed 2011

== Newfoundland and Labrador ==
Correctional services in Newfoundland and Labrador are administered by the Corrections and Community Services branch of the Department of Justice and Public Safety.

Name	Location	Security	Inmates	Notes
Bishop’s Falls Correctional Centre	Bishop's Falls	minimum	Adult males	opened in 1983
Corner Brook Lockup	Corner Brook	remand	Adult males & females	operated by the Adult Custody Division since 1981
Her Majesty’s Penitentiary	St. John’s	medium/maximum	Adult males	constructed in 1859; renovated in 1945, 1981, 1994; houses all admissions from the Avalon Peninsula, high-security male inmates, long-term remands, and those awaiting transfer to a federal penitentiary
Labrador Correctional Centre	Happy Valley-Goose Bay	minimum/medium	Adult	
Newfoundland & Labrador Correctional Centre for Women	Clarenville	minimum/remand	Adult females	opened in 1982; the only facility for female prisoners in the province
Newfoundland and Labrador Youth Centre	Whitbourne		Youth	
St. John’s Lockup	St. John’s	remand	Adult males & females	operated by the Adult Custody Division since 1981; a short-term holding unit for inmates remanded to await court appearance; under the auspices of His Majesty's Penitentiary
St. John’s Youth Detention Centre	St. John’s		Youth	
West Coast Correctional Institution	Stephenville	minimum/medium	Adult	constructed in 1978
Salmonier Correctional Institution				closed 2004

== Nova Scotia ==
Corrections in Nova Scotia are administered by the Correctional Services of the province's Department of Justice.

Current facilities, as of April 2021
Name	Location	Security	Inmates	Notes
Cape Breton Correctional Facility	Sydney	medium	Adult males	opened on 21 February 1975; capacity of 96 adult male offenders (also operates, as needed, a 4-bed dorm for adult women and a 6-bed temporary detention facility for youth); co-located with the Cape Breton Youth Detention Facility
Cape Breton Youth Detention Facility		remand (up to 72 hours)	Youth males & females	opened on 28 August 2006; capacity of 8 offenders (boys and girls are housed separately); co-located with the Cape Breton Correctional Facility
Central Nova Scotia Correctional Facility	Dartmouth	medium	Adult males & females	opened in October 2001 (replaced the facilities in Colchester, Halifax, Kings and Lunenburg); capacity of 322 males and 48 females; co-located with the Capital District Health Authority's East Coast Forensic Hospital (independently operated)
Northeast Nova Scotia Correctional Facility	New Glasgow		Adult	opened in February 2015 (replaced the Antigonish and Cumberland correctional facilities); capacity of 196 offenders; designed with two separate units—Alpha and Bravo—each consisting of 3 smaller ‘living units’ for offenders, including a 40-bed, 38-bed, and a 20-bed living space.; services courthouses in Truro, Amherst, Pictou, Antigonish, and Port Hawkesbury.
Nova Scotia Youth Centre	Waterville	multilevel/remand	Youth males & females	opened on 20 June 1988; 120 cells (boys and girls are housed in separate living units); co-located with an IWK Health Centre site; partnered with the Annapolis Valley Regional School Board to operate Valley Integrated Youth Services (formerly Centre 24-7), an off-site education program
Southwest Nova Scotia Correctional Facility	Yarmouth	medium/minimum	Adult males	opened on 1 April 2004; replaced the Yarmouth Correctional Centre; capacity of 38 sentenced/remanded adult male offenders

Closed facilities
Name	Location	Closed	Replaced by	Inmates	Notes
Antigonish Correctional Facility	Antigonish	2015	Northeast Nova Scotia Correctional Facility	Adult males	opened in 1948; 17 beds
Colchester Correctional Centre	Colchester	2001	Central Nova Scotia Correctional Facility	Adult	
Cumberland Correctional Facility	Cumberland	2015	Northeast Nova Scotia Correctional Facility	Adult males	opened in 1890; renovated 1978; 29 beds
Guysborough Correctional Centre	Guysborough	2000		Adult	
Halifax Correctional Centre	Halifax	2001	Central Nova Scotia Correctional Facility	Adult	
Kings Correctional Centre	Kings	2001	Central Nova Scotia Correctional Facility	Adult	
Lunenburg Correctional Centre	Lunenburg	2001	Central Nova Scotia Correctional Facility	Adult	
Yarmouth Correctional Centre	Yarmouth	2004	Southwest Nova Scotia Correctional Facility	Adult	

== Northwest Territories ==
Corrections in the Northwest Territories are administered by the Corrections Service of the territory's Department of Justice.

Name	Location	Security	Inmates	Notes
Fort Smith Correctional Complex	Fort Smith	minimum/medium	Adult males & females	holds territorial and federal offenders, as well as remanded inmates; male unit formerly Riverrige Correctional Centre; female unit formerly Territorial Women's Correctional Centre
North Slave Correctional Complex	Yellowknife	multilevel/remand	Adult males; Youth males & females	
South Mackenzie Correctional Centre	Hay River	minimum/medium	Adult males	holds territorial and federal offenders

== Nunavut ==
Corrections in Nunavut are administered by Nunavut Ministry of Justice.

Nunavut prisons, as of September 2021
Name	Location	Security	Inmates	Notes
Aaqqigiarvik Correctional Healing Facility (ACHF)	Iqaluit	minimum-maximum	Adult males (143)	opened in 1986 (as Baffin Correctional Centre)
Kugluktuk Ilavut Centre (KIC)	Kugluktuk	minimum (halfway house)	Adult males (15)	opened in 2005
Rankin Inlet Healing Facility (RIHF)	Rankin Inlet	minimum-medium	Adult males (48)	opened in 2013
Nunavut Women's Correctional Centre (NWCC)	Iqaluit		Adult females	opened in 2010
Uttaqivik Community Residential Centre (CRC)	Iqaluit	minimum (halfway house)	Adult males (14)	opened in 2000
Isumaqsunngittukkuvik Youth Facility	Iqaluit	multilevel	Youth males & females (12)	opened in 1989

== Ontario ==
Adult corrections in Ontario are administered by the Ministry of the Solicitor General, whereas youth detention centres for secure detention of young people ages 12–18 are administered by the Ministry of Children, Community and Social Services.

== Prince Edward Island ==
Corrections in Prince Edward Island are administered by the Community and Correctional Services Division of the Ministry of Justice and Public Safety and Attorney General.

- Prince County Correctional Centre — Summerside
- PEI Youth Centre — Summerside
- Provincial Correctional Centre — Charlottetown

== Quebec ==
Corrections in Quebec are administered by the Direction générale des services correctionnels of the province's Ministry of Public Security (French: Ministère de la Sécurité publique).

== Saskatchewan ==
Corrections in Saskatchewan are administered by the Ministry of Corrections, Public Safety and Policing.

- Saskatoon Correctional Centre — Saskatoon
- Regina Correctional Centre — Regina
- Prince Albert Correctional Centre — Prince Albert
- Pine Grove Correctional Centre
- Paul Dojack Youth Centre — Regina
- Kilburn Hall Youth Centre — Saskatoon

== Yukon ==
Corrections in Yukon are administered by the Community and Correctional Services Branch of the Ministry of Justice.

- Whitehorse Correctional Centre — a multi-level 190-inmate facility, for adult males and females, completed in February 2012 and built next to an existing prison building (c. 1967)
- Justice Wellness Centre — Whitehorse

== See also ==
- List of prisons in Canada
- Incarceration in Canada
