= List of prisons in Canada =

This is a list of prisons and other secure correctional facilities in Canada, not including local jails.

In Canada, all offenders who receive a sentence of 24 months or greater must serve their sentence in a federal correctional facility administered by the Correctional Service of Canada (CSC). Any offender who receives a sentence less than 24 months, or who is incarcerated while awaiting trial or sentencing, must serve their sentence in a provincial/territorial correctional facility.

Members of the Canadian Armed Forces who are sentenced under military law serve their sentences at detention barracks designated by the Department of National Defence. For inmates with serious mental health conditions, CSC has 5 regional treatment centres.

In addition, CSC also provides healing lodges specifically for Indigenous offenders, designed with the intention "to address factors that led to their incarceration and prepare them for reintegration into society." CSC currently funds and/or operates 10 healing lodges across Canada, while others are operated by local Indigenous communities or partner organizations.

== Ontario ==
Provincial correctional facilities in Ontario are administered by the province's Ministry of the Solicitor General.

Name	Location	Opened	Security classification	Sexes	Administration
Bath Institution	Bath	1972	Medium	Men	Federal
Beaver Creek Institution	Gravenhurst	1961	Minimum/Medium	Men	Federal
Collins Bay Institution	Kingston	1930	Minimum/Medium/Maximum	Men	Federal
Grand Valley Institution for Women	Kitchener	1997	Minimum/Medium	Women	Federal
Joyceville Institution	Kingston	1959	Minimum	Men	Federal
Millhaven Institution	Bath	1971	Maximum	Men	Federal
Warkworth Institution	Trent Hills	1967	Medium	Men	Federal
Algoma Treatment and Remand Centre	Sault Ste. Marie	1990	Medium/Maximum	Men	Provincial
Brockville Jail	Brockville	1842	Maximum	Men	Provincial
Central East Correctional Centre	Kawartha Lakes	2002	Medium/Maximum	Men	Provincial
Central North Correctional Centre	Penetanguishene	2001	Medium/Maximum	Men	Provincial
Elgin-Middlesex Detention Centre	London	1977	Maximum	Men / 1 women's range	Provincial
Fort Frances Jail	Fort Frances	1908		Men	Provincial
Hamilton-Wentworth Detention Centre	Hamilton	1978	Maximum	Men	Provincial
Kenora Jail	Kenora	1929	Maximum	Men/Women	Provincial
Maplehurst Correctional Complex	Milton	1975	Medium/Maximum	Men	Provincial
Monteith Correctional Complex	Iroquois Falls	1938	Medium/Maximum	Men	Provincial
Niagara Detention Centre	Thorold	1973		Men	Provincial
North Bay Jail	North Bay	1930	Maximum	Men	Provincial
Ontario Correctional Institute	Brampton	1973		Men	Provincial
Ottawa-Carleton Detention Centre	Ottawa	1972		Men	Provincial
Quinte Detention Centre	Greater Napanee	1971		Men	Provincial
St. Lawrence Valley Correctional & Treatment Centre	Brockville	2003		Men	Provincial
Sarnia Jail	Sarnia	1961		Men	Provincial
South West Detention Centre	Lakeshore	2013	Maximum	Men & Women	Provincial
Stratford Jail	Stratford	1901		Men	Provincial
Sudbury Jail	Greater Sudbury	1928		Men	Provincial
Thunder Bay Correctional Centre	Thunder Bay	1965		Mixed	Provincial
Thunder Bay Jail	Thunder Bay	1928		Men	Provincial
Toronto East Detention Centre	Scarborough	1977	Maximum	Men	Provincial
Toronto South Detention Centre	Etobicoke	2014	Medium/Maximum	Men	Provincial
Vanier Centre for Women	Milton	2003	Medium/Maximum	Women	Provincial

== Quebec ==
In Quebec, provincial correctional facilities are administered by the province's Ministry of Public Security (French: Ministère de la Sécurité publique).

Name	Location	Security classification	Sexes	Administration
Archambault Institution	Sainte-Anne-des-Plaines	Medium	Men	Federal
Bordeaux Prison	Montreal	Minimum	Men	Provincial
Cowansville Institution	Cowansville	Medium	Men	Federal
Donnacona Institution	Donnacona	Maximum	Men	Federal
Drummondville Institution	Drummondville	Medium	Men	Federal
Federal Training Centre	Laval	Minimum	Men	Federal
Joliette Institution for Women	Joliette	Multi	Women	Federal
La Macaza Institution	La Macaza	Medium	Men	Federal
Leclerc Institution	Laval	Multi	Women	Provincial
Montée Saint-François Institution	Laval	Minimum	Men	Federal
Port-Cartier Institution	Port-Cartier	Maximum	Men	Federal
Regional Mental Health Centre	Sainte-Anne-des-Plaines	(treatment centre)		Federal
Regional Reception Centre: Special Handling Unit	Sainte-Anne-des-Plaines	Maximum: Supermax	Men	Federal
Rivière-des-Prairie (RDP) Institution	Montréal	Minimum	Men	Provincial
Talbot Institution		Minimum	Men	Provincial
Waseskun Healing Centre	Saint-Alphonse-Rodriguez	Minimum (healing lodge)	Men	Federal

== Atlantic ==
The Atlantic Region consists of four provinces: Nova Scotia, New Brunswick, Prince Edward Island, and Newfoundland and Labrador.

Name	Location	Security classification	Sexes	Administration
Atlantic Institution	Blackville, New Brunswick	Maximum	Men	Federal
Dorchester Penitentiary	Dorchester, New Brunswick	Medium	Men	Federal
Her Majesty's Penitentiary	St. John's, Newfoundland and Labrador	Medium-Maximum	Men	Federal
Shepody Healing Centre	Dorchester, New Brunswick	Multi-level (treatment facility)	Men	Federal
Provincial Correctional Centre	Miltonvale Park, Prince Edward Island	Minimum	Both	Provincial
Prince County Correctional Centre	Summerside, Prince Edward Island	Minimum	Men	Provincial
Springhill Institution	Cumberland County, Nova Scotia	Medium	Men	Federal
Westmorland Institution	Dorchester, New Brunswick	Minimum	Men	Federal
Nova Institution For Women	Truro, Nova Scotia	Minimum-Maximum	Women	Federal
Saint John Correctional Facility	Saint John, New Brunswick	Multi-level	Men	Provincial
Central Nova Scotia Correctional Facility
East Coast Forensic Hospital	Halifax, Nova Scotia	Medium	Both	Provincial
New Brunswick Women's Correctional Centre	Miramichi, New Brunswick	Multi-Level	Women	Provincial

== Prairie ==
The Prairie Region consists of the provinces of Manitoba, Saskatchewan, and Alberta, as well as Northwestern Ontario and the Northwest Territories.

Name	Location	Security classification	Sexes	Administration
Bowden Institution	Bowden, AB	Minimum/Medium	Men	Federal
Brandon Correctional Centre	Brandon, MB	Medium	Men	Provincial (Manitoba Corrections)
Buffalo Sage for Women	Edmonton, AB	Minimum (healing lodge)	Women	Community (Native Counselling Service of Alberta)
Calgary Remand Centre	Calgary, AB	Remand	Men	
Canadian Forces Service Prison and Detention Barracks	Edmonton, AB			Canadian Armed Forces
Drumheller Institution	Drumheller, AB	Minimum/Medium	Men	Federal
Edmonton Institution	Edmonton, AB	Maximum	Men	Federal
Edmonton Institution for Women	Edmonton, AB	Multi	Women	Federal
Edmonton Remand Centre	Edmonton, AB	Remand	Men	
Fort Smith Correctional Complex	Fort Smith, NWT		Both	Territorial (NWT Corrections Service)
Grande Cache Institution	Grande Cache, AB		Men	Federal
Grierson Centre	Edmonton, AB	Minimum	Men	Federal
Headingley Correctional Centre	Headingley, MB	Remand/Multi-level	Men	Provincial (Manitoba Corrections)
Milner Ridge Correctional Centre	Beausejour, MB	Multi	Men	Provincial (Manitoba Corrections)
North Slave Correctional Complex	Yellowknife, NWT		Men	Territorial (NWT Corrections Service)
O-chi-chak-ko-sipi First Nation Healing Lodge	O-Chi-Chak-Ko-Sipi, MB	Minimum (healing lodge)	Men	Ochichakkosipi First Nation
Okimaw Ohci Healing Lodge for Aboriginal Women	Near Maple Creek, SK	Minimum/Medium (healing lodge)	Women	Federal
The Pas Correctional Centre	The Pas, MB	Multi	Both	Provincial (Manitoba Corrections)
Pê Sâkâstêw Centre	Maskwacis, AB	Minimum (healing lodge)	Men	Federal
Prince Albert Grand Council Spiritual Healing Lodge	Prince Albert, SK	Minimum (healing lodge)		Community
Regional Psychiatric Centre	Saskatoon, SK	Multi	Both	Federal
Riverbend Institution	One kilometre west of Prince Albert, SK	Minimum	Men	Federal
Rockwood Institution	Stony Mountain, MB	Minimum	Men	Provincial (Manitoba Corrections)
Saskatchewan Penitentiary	One kilometre west of Prince Albert, SK	Medium/Maximum	Men	Federal
Saskatoon Correctional Centre	Saskatoon, SK	Remand/Multi-level	Men	
South Mackenzie Correctional Centre	Hay River, NWT	Minimum/Medium	Men	Territorial (NWT Corrections Service)
Stan Daniels Healing Centre	Edmonton, AB	Minimum (healing lodge)	Men	Community (Native Counselling Service of Alberta)
Stony Mountain Institution	Stony Mountain, MB	Multi	Men	Federal
Willow Cree Healing Lodge	Duck Lake, SK	Minimum (healing lodge)	Men	Federal
Winnipeg Remand Centre	Winnipeg, MB	Remand/Multi-level	Both	Provincial (Manitoba Corrections)
Women’s Correctional Centre	Headingley, MB	Multi	Women	Provincial (Manitoba Corrections)

== Pacific ==
The Pacific Region consists of the province of British Columbia and the Yukon Territory.

Provincial correctional facilities in BC are administered by B.C. Corrections under the province's Ministry of Attorney General. Meanwhile, those in the Yukon are administered by Yukon Corrections.

Name	Location	Security classification	Sexes	Administration
Alouette Correctional Centre for Women	Maple Ridge, BC		Women	Provincial
Ford Mountain Correctional Centre	Chilliwack, BC	Medium	Men	Provincial
Fraser Regional Correctional Centre	Maple Ridge, BC	Secure	Men	Provincial
Fraser Valley Institution for Women	Fraser Valley, BC	Multi	Women	Federal
Kamloops Regional Correctional Centre	Kamloops, BC		Men	Provincial
Kent Institution	Agassiz, BC	Maximum	Men	Federal
Kwìkwèxwelhp Healing Village	Harrison Mills, BC	Minimum (healing lodge)	Men	Federal
Matsqui Institution	Abbotsford, BC	Medium	Men	Federal
Mountain Institution	Agassiz, BC	Medium	Men	Federal
Mission Institution	Mission, BC	Medium	Men	Federal
Mission Minimum Institution (formerly Ferndale Institution)	Mission, BC	Minimum	Men	Federal
Nanaimo Correctional Centre	Nanaimo, BC		Men	Provincial
North Fraser Pretrial Centre	Port Coquitlam, BC	Remand	Men	Provincial
Okanagan Correctional Centre	Oliver, BC		Mixed	Provincial
Prince George Regional Correctional Centre	Prince George, BC			Provincial
Pacific Institution/Regional Treatment Centre	Abbotsford, BC	(treatment centre)	Men	Federal
Surrey Pretrial Services Centre	Surrey, BC	Remand	Men	Provincial
Vancouver Island Regional Correctional Centre	Victoria, BC	Maximum		Provincial
Whitehorse Correctional Centre	Whitehorse, Yukon	Multi	Both	Territorial
William Head Institution	Metchosin, BC	Minimum	Men	Federal

== Nunavut ==
Facilities, as of 2015
Name	Location	Opened	Security classification	Sexes
Baffin Correctional Centre (now Aaqqigiarvik Correctional Healing Facility)	Iqaluit	1986	Minimum-Maximum	Men
Kugluktuk Ilavut Centre	Kugluktuk	2005	Minimum	Men
Makigiarvik	Iqaluit	2015	Minimum	Men
Nunavut Women’s Correctional Centre	Iqaluit	2010	Medium	Women
Rankin Inlet Healing Facility	Rankin Inlet	2013	Minimum-Medium	Men
Uttaqivik Community Residential Centre	Iqaluit	2000	Minimum (halfway house)	Men
