= Frank P. Miller =

Canadian criminal justice reformer

Frank P. Miller (1912–Feb 8, 2000) was a major figure in criminal-justice reform in Canada who helped create the modern parole system. He served as executive director of the National Parole Service, president of the Canadian Criminal Justice Association, and was a founding member of the Parole Board of Canada. He was also the first classification officer in the Canadian penitentiary system.

== Career ==
Miller’s career in rehabilitation began in the Canadian Armed Forces during the Second World War. In 1945, he was promoted to the rank of Captain and served as Senior Selection Officer and Senior Rehabilitation Officer. He returned to Canada later that year and served as Rehabilitation Officer until his resignation from active service in 1946.

At that time, he began working part-time for the John Howard Society, until 1947 when he was named the first classification officer in the Canadian penitentiary system; classification reports were the beginning of a parole system in Canada, and stemmed from recommendations in the Archambault report.

Miller left that position in 1952 to become assistant director of the Department of Justice’s Remission Service (the forerunner of the Parole Board of Canada). He and the other assistant director, Benoit Godbout, worked underneath director Allan Macleod; Miller said that their work together “marked the beginning of a new approach to corrections and a reorientation of the parole system from clemency to rehabilitation.” In 1959, the government passed the Parole Act, which abolished the Remission Service, replacing it with the Parole Board of Canada – a paroling authority independent from the Department of Corrections. Miller was appointed to the board, along with Edouard Dion, J. Alex Edmison and chair T. George Street.

He left the Parole Board in 1965 to become executive director of the National Parole Service(now Correctional Service of Canada), where he stayed until 1972. That year, he was appointed the Canadian co-ordinator to the Fifth United Nations Congress on the Prevention of Crime and the Treatment of Offenders. He retired from the public service in 1976.

== Volunteerism ==
Throughout his career Miller volunteered with the Canadian Criminal Justice Association, serving as the head of its subcommittee on records, and as its president from 1969 to 1971. He also served on the editorial committee of the Canadian Journal of Corrections, an academic journal published by the Association.

Miller also served as secretary of the National Associations Active in Criminal Justice, as a member of the Task Force on Community Involvement in Criminal Justice, and as a volunteer for, and later president of, the Church Council on Justice and Corrections.
