= Ouimet Committee =

The Special Committee on Corrections (better known as the Ouimet Committee) was a committee appointed by the Canadian Minister of Justice Guy Favreau in 1964 “to study the broad field of corrections, in its widest sense and to recommend … what changes, if any, should be made in the law and practice relating to these matters.” The Committee was named after its chairman, Quebec Superior Court Justice Roger Ouimet.

The committee's final report, published in 1969, recommended, in general, a rehabilitative rather than punitive approach to corrections. Among many other findings, it called for the complete abolition of corporal punishment in Canada, and an overhaul of the system for dealing with high-risk offenders.

== Formation ==
The committee was announced in the House of Commons by Favreau on April 9, 1965, though it had been previously referred to in the Speech from the Throne earlier that month. Its terms of reference, announced in the House on April 9, were:

To study the broad field of corrections, in its widest sense, from the initial investigation of an offence through to the final discharge of a prisoner from imprisonment or parole, including such steps and measures as arrest, summonsing, bail, representation in Court, conviction, probation, sentencing, training, medical and psychiatric attention, release, parole, pardon, post release supervision and guidance and rehabilitation; to recommend as conclusions are reached, what changes, if any, should be made in the law and practice relating to these matters in order better to assure the protection of the individual and, where possible, his rehabilitation, having in mind always adequate protection for the community; and to consider and recommend upon any matters necessarily ancillary to the foregoing and such related matters as may later be referred to the Committee; but excluding consideration of specific offences except where such consideration bears directly upon any of the above mentioned matters.

—Justice Minister Guy Favreau, Parliament of Canada

== Members ==
The committee had five members:

- Chair Justice Roger Ouimet, a judge serving on the Quebec Superior Court and Court of Queen’s Bench (Criminal Jurisdiction);
- Vice-chair G. Arthur Martin, Q.C., a Toronto-based lawyer;
- Member J.R. Lemieux, retired deputy commissioner of the Royal Canadian Mounted Police;
- Dorothy McArton, executive director of the Family Bureau of Greater Winnipeg; and
- Secretary/member William T. McGrath, executive director of the Canadian Corrections Association (now the Canadian Criminal Justice Association).

Claude Bouchard, associate secretary of the Canadian Corrections Association under McGrath, was appointed assistant secretary of the Ouimet Committee, though not a member. Furthermore, several members of the Canadian Corrections Association were credited in the report as consultants and advisors in the final report.

== Findings ==
The 505-page final report of the committee was submitted on March 31, 1969, but not made public until Sept. 25, 1969 It was titled Toward Unity: Criminal Justice and Corrections.

The title refers to its main, general finding, which was a need for “more effective cooperation among law enforcement agencies, the judiciary and the corrections services,” as well as to the fact that it was more broad-ranging than previous criminal-justice committees. The overarching theme of the committee's findings, as laid out in eight “main principles” laid out in Chapter 2, is a call for a move toward rehabilitation and away from punishment in Canada's criminal-justice system. A punitive approach does less to address the protection of all members of society, which is “the only justifiable purpose of the criminal process in contemporary Canada.”

The report continued on the work began by the Archambault Commission 30 years earlier. McArton contributed a “Separate Statement” at the end of the report which functioned much like a judicial dissenting opinion. Though she stated that she agreed with all of the report's conclusions, she felt two issues needed further attention: federal/provincial division of responsibility, and the potential for actors outside the criminal-justice system to combat anti-social behaviour. Her 16-page statement expands upon those issues.

== Reception ==
The recommendations were received favourably in the popular press at the time. Two days after it was made public, an editorial in the national newspaper The Globe and Mail called the final report “an impressive effort to find more just means of dealing with law-breakers”. A week later, The Toronto Star criticized the head of the Canadian police chiefs’ association for publicly opposing its recommendations.

Many of the report recommendations were eventually adopted by the federal government, or at least shaped future criminal-justice policy. Correction Service Canada cites the committee's complete condemnation of corporal punishment as a driving force in the practice being abolished in Canada in 1972, three years after the report was released. The federal government also accepted the committee's call to replace the “habitual offender” and “dangerous sexual offender” designations with a single “dangerous offender” designation. The committee stated in its report that the previous designations included criminals who represented “nuisances” to society without necessarily qualifying as dangerous, and at the same time did not include offenders who did represent a danger to society without having displayed “habitual” behaviour. In response to these findings, Parliament amended this section of the Criminal Code in 1977.
