= Incarceration in Canada =

Incarceration in Canada is one of the main forms of punishment, rehabilitation, or both, for the commission of an indictable offense and other offenses.

According to Statistics Canada, as of 2018/2019 there were a total of 37,854 adult offenders incarcerated in Canadian federal and provincial prisons on an average day for an incarceration rate of 127 per 100,000 population. Of these, 23,783 were in provincial/territorial custody and 14,071 were in federal custody.

Young offenders are covered by the Youth Criminal Justice Act (YCJA), which was enacted in 2003. In 2018/2019, an average of 716 youth between the ages of 12 and 17 were incarcerated in Canada, for a rate of 4 per 10,000 population. This number represents a 10% decrease from the previous year and a 32% decrease from 2014-2015.

Indigenous people are vastly over-represented and make up a rising share in the Canadian prison system, making up 30.04% of the offender population in 2020, compared to 4.9% of the total population. In 2018-2019, the offender population included Caucasians at 54.2% and Black people at 7.2%; meanwhile, Asian people made up only 5.3%, thereby being vastly underrepresented compared to their share of the overall population at 20.1% in 2021.

== History ==
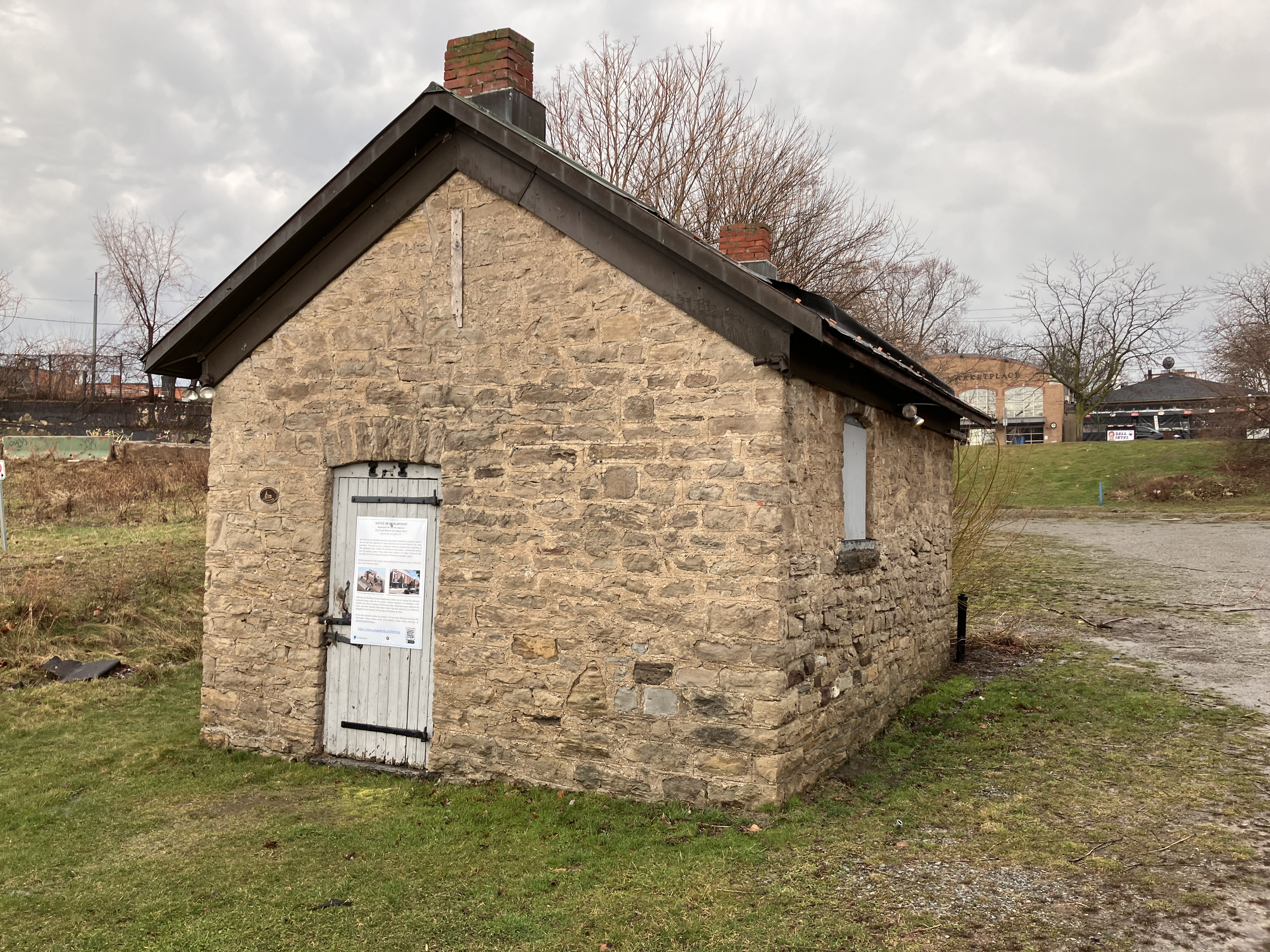
The historic jail in Port Dalhousie, built in 1845. Some small communities in Canada had small prisons and holding cells built to facilitate local incarnation

The correction system in Canada dates to French and British colonial settlement, when all crimes were deemed deserving of punishment. Such was often meted out in public, as physical pain and humiliation were the preferred forms of punishment, including whipping, branding, and pillorying. In other cases, offenders were transported to other countries and abandoned to their fate. Execution was also used as punishment for serious crimes.

In 1789, Philadelphian Quakers in the United States introduced the penitentiary as an alternative to such harsh punishment. The concept of long-term imprisonment eventually spread to England as an alternative to exiling offenders to the penal colonies, including Canada. The first penitentiary in Upper Canada (present-day Ontario) was opened in 1835 as the Kingston Penitentiary. This facility was built by the colonial government and, at the time of Confederation in 1867, it was under provincial jurisdiction (of the Province of Ontario). It came under federal responsibility with the passage of the Penitentiary Act in 1868.

In 1859, the offences punishable by death in Canada included murder, rape, treason, poisoning, or injuring a person with the intent to commit murder, mistreatment of a girl under 10 years of age, arson, among other things. As of 1869, only three offences were punishable by death: murder, rape, and treason.

The federal government opened additional penitentiaries in other parts of Canada in decades following Confederation. An increase in crime during the Great Depression saw a rapid increase in Canada's incarceration rate. The Prison for Women opened in 1934. The Archambault Commission (officially the Royal Commission to Investigate the Penal System in Canada) was established that year in response to riots, overcrowding, and strikes in Canadian prisons. The final report was published in 1938 and was the first comprehensive report in Canada to emphasize crime prevention and offender rehabilitation.

In the 1960s, new approaches to rehabilitation and reintegration were adopted. The first 'gradual release' program was introduced at Collins Bay Institution, wherein inmates were allowed to work outside the institution during the day and return in the evening. In 1969, an experimental living unit was opened at medium-security Springhill Institution in Nova Scotia, as part of a community pilot program to aid inmates in preparing themselves for "outside" life.

Capital punishment was abolished in Canada in 1976. Also in the 1960s and 1970s, various halfway houses were opened, as well as governments and community groups taking on the essential needs of ex-inmates by providing them with room and board, and often helping them find work, enroll in school, and obtain counselling services.

== Division of correctional systems ==
In Canada, all offenders who receive a sentence of 24 months or greater must serve their sentence in a federal correctional facility administered by the Correctional Service of Canada (CSC). Any offender who receives a sentence less than 24 months, or who is incarcerated while awaiting trial or sentencing, must serve their sentence in a provincial/territorial correctional facility.

Members of the Canadian Armed Forces who are sentenced under military law serve their sentences at detention barracks designated by the Department of National Defence. For inmates with serious mental health conditions, CSC has 5 regional treatment centres.

Additionally, CSC also provides healing lodges specifically for Indigenous offenders, designed with the intention "to address factors that led to their incarceration and prepare them for reintegration into society." CSC currently funds and/or operates 10 healing lodges across Canada, while others are operated by local Indigenous communities or partner organizations.

== Security levels ==
Canada's correctional system designates facilities under various security levels. Most provincial/territorial correctional facilities where offenders serve sentences of less than 24 months, or are held in pre-trial and pre-sentence custody, have cells at different security levels within the same facility.

The majority of in-custody offenders are classified as "medium security" risk.

Security level	Characteristics
Main security levels
Minimum Security	An institution where the perimeter is defined but usually there are no walls or fences.; There are no armed correctional officers, no towers, no razor wire or electronic surveillance equipment.; Restrictions on movement, association and privileges are minimal.; Inmates are non-violent and pose very limited risk to the safety of the community. Many are on work-release programs that allow them to hold jobs during the day.; Inmates show the desire and ability to get along responsibly with fellow inmates with little or no supervision.
Medium Security	These institutions are usually surrounded by chain-link fences topped with razor wire. Firearms are present but not normally deployed within the perimeter.; Inmates pose a risk to the safety of the community. They are contained in an environment which promotes and tests socially acceptable behaviour.; Inmates are expected to act responsibly under regular and often direct supervision and participate in their correctional program plans.; Many of these institutions have training centres and a variety of educational and treatment facilities.
Maximum Security	Maximum-security facilities are surrounded by high (20 feet) walls or fences with guard towers in strategic positions and electronic systems that ensure any movement within the perimeter is detected.; Correctional officers in the towers are supplied with firearms and there are additional locked caches of firearms within the institutions in the event of a serious disturbance.; Various parts of the facility are separated by locked gates, fences and walls. Inmate movement, association and privileges are strictly controlled because inmates pose a serious risk to staff, other offenders and the community.; Inmates are expected to interact effectively with other individuals and in highly structured groups such as in educational and treatment programs and skills development programs.; Some inmates live in segregation units, due either to behavioural problems or out of concern that they will be harmed by other inmates, usually as a result of their crimes.
Other security levels and considerations
Multi-Level Security	Offenders with serious mental health issues are accommodated in multi-level security facilities that combine the features of two or more of the security levels described above.
Special Handling Unit	The highest level of security is reserved for the small percentage of extremely violent male offenders who cannot function safely at the maximum-security level.; The goal of the SHU is to prepare inmates to return to maximum security institutions by evaluating their risks and behaviour and providing appropriate programs.
Women Offenders	There are no firearms within the institution or on the perimeter, which is surrounded by a chain-link fence and topped with razor wire.; Typically, women are housed in living units that accommodate 10 persons. Their movement, association and privileges are designed to give them freedom to pursue educational and training opportunities within the grounds of the institution.; Women with serious behavioural issues may be confined to a "secure unit" within the larger institution.
Aboriginal Inmates	Aboriginal inmates can be found in institutions of every security level. Their particular needs are accommodated in special living units where Native culture and spirituality are taught and practised.; In addition, the Correctional Service of Canada is responsible for the establishment of eight healing lodges across the country, specially designed to accommodate the needs of minimum-security Aboriginal offenders, based on the principles, philosophy and teachings of the Aboriginal way of life. A small number of non-Aboriginal offenders may be accommodated at healing lodges if they are willing to take the same programs as Aboriginal offenders.
Community Correctional Centres	Community correctional centres are federal facilities that house offenders on conditional release. The facility director, parole officers and support staff work as a team, often in co-operation with community partners, to supervise and provide programs for offenders.

== Statistics ==
Indigenous people are vastly over-represented and make up a rising share in the Canadian prison system, making up 30.04% of the offender population in 2020, compared to 4.9% of the total population. In 2018-2019, the offender population included Caucasians at 54.2% and Black people at 7.2%; meanwhile, Asian people made up only 5.3%, thereby being vastly underrepresented compared to their share of the overall population at 20.1% in 2021.

Offenders with life or indeterminate sentences represents 24% of the total offender population in Canada. 70% of offenders are serving a sentence for a violent offence.

Offenders with life or indeterminate sentences
Offense/designation	Total offender population		In custody in a CSC facility (Incarcerated)	In community under supervision	
Offense/designation	#	%	In custody in a CSC facility (Incarcerated)	Day Parole	Full Parole
Life sentence
1st Degree Murder	1,270	5.4	1,002	59	209
2nd Degree Murder	3,571	15.2	1,932	248	1,391
Other	199	0.8	117	7	75
Total	5,040	21.5	3,051	314	1,675
Indeterminate sentence
Dangerous offender	635	2.7	605	14	16
Dangerous sexual offender	14	0.1	8	1	5
Habitual offender	2	0	0	0	2
Total	651	2.8	613	15	23

Total offender population by race
Race	2014-15		2018-19	
Race	#	%	#	%
Indigenous (Note: "Indigenous" includes offenders who are Inuit, Innu, Métis, and North American Indian.)	5,009	21.8	5,914	25.2
Inuit	236	1.0	198	0.8
Métis	1,381	6.0	1,723	7.3
North American Indian	3,392	14.8	3,993	17.0
Asian	1,318	5.7	1,250	5.3
Arab	155	0.7	179	0.8
Arab / West Asian	195	0.8	176	0.8
Asiatic (Note: "Total for Asiatic includes Asian-East and -Southeast, Asian South, Asian West, and Asiatic.")	272	1.2	377	1.6
Chinese	134	0.6	95	0.4
East Indian	13	0.1	13	0.1
Filipino	71	0.3	85	0.4
Japanese	5	0.0	8	0.0
Korean	21	0.1	12	0.1
South East Asian	273	1.2	184	0.8
South Asian	179	0.8	121	0.5
Black	1,895	8.3	1,692	7.2
Caucasian	13,870	60.4	12,713	54.2
Hispanic (Note: "Hispanic" includes offenders who are Hispanic and Latin American.)	250	1.1	267	1.1
Hispanic	6	0.0	7	0.0
Latin American	244	1.1	260	1.1
Other/Unknown (Note: "Other/Unknown" includes offenders who are European French, European Eastern, European-Northern, European-Southern, European-Western, Multiracial/ethnic, Oceania, British Isles, Caribbean, Sub-Sahara African, offenders unable to identify to one race, other and unknown)	619	2.7	1,628	6.9
Total	22,961	100	23,464	100

Religious identification of offender population, 2018-19
Religion	#	%
Christian	11,219	47.8
No religion affiliation (Note: "No religion Affiliation" includes offenders who are Agnostic, Atheist, Humanist and offenders who have no religion affiliation.)	3,695	15.7
Unknown	3,142	13.4
Muslim	1,695	7.2
Traditional Aboriginal Spirituality (Note: "Traditional Aboriginal Spirituality" includes offenders who are "Aboriginal Spirituality Catholic, Aboriginal Spirituality Protestant, Native Spirituality, Catholic - Native Spirituality, Native Spirituality Protestant and Aboriginal Spirituality.")	1,591	6.8
Other religions	579	2.5
Buddhist	519	2.2
Wicca/Pagan (Note: Wiccan/Pagan includes offenders who are Asatru Paganism, Druidry Paganism, Pagan and Wicca.)	352	1.5
Jewish (Note: "Jewish" includes offenders who are Jewish Orthodox, Jewish Reformed and Judaism.)	244	1.0
Sikh	183	0.8
Rastafarian	181	0.8
Hindu (Note: "Hindu" includes offenders who are Hindu and Siddha Yoga.)	64	0.3

== See also ==
- Correctional Service of Canada
- Criminal sentencing in Canada
- Capital punishment in Canada
- Provincial correctional services in Canada
- List of youth detention incidents in Canada
- John Howard Society — Prison advocacy group
