= William McGrath (disambiguation) =

William McGrath (1916–1992) was a loyalist from Northern Ireland.

William McGrath may also refer to:

- William L. McGrath (1894–1975), American business executive
- William Thomas McGrath (1918–1999), executive director of what is now the Canadian Criminal Justice Association
- Bill McGrath (William Desmond McGrath, 1936–2018), Australian politician and Australian rules footballer
