= USD (disambiguation) =

USD is an abbreviation for the United States dollar, the official currency of the United States.

USD may also refer to:

- University of San Diego, San Diego, California, United States
- University of South Dakota, Vermillion, South Dakota, United States
- Under Secretary of Defense, United States
- Unified school district, a school body with both grade school and high school education
- Ultrasonic Silent Drive, a Tamron lens designation
- Unité spéciale de détention (USD), the French name of the Special Handling Unit (SHU) at the Regional Reception Centre, a Canadian prison
- Sanata Dharma University (Universitas Sanata Dharma), Indonesia
- Universal Scene Description, an open-source graphics framework by Pixar, and associated .usd file format
- Upside Down, a Houdini's term for the Chinese Water Torture Cell
- Upside-down motorcycle fork
