= Allan Legere =

Canadian criminal (1948–2026)

- Mugshot of Legere in 1987
- Born: February 13, 1948; Chatham, New Brunswick, Canada
- Died: March 9, 2026 (aged 78); Edmonton, Alberta, Canada
- Other name: Monster of the Miramichi
- Convictions: Murder, arson, rape
- Penalty: Life imprisonment without the possibility of parole for 25 years

Details
- Victims: 7 (2 survived)
- Span of crimes: June 21, 1986 – November 24, 1989
- Country: Canada
- Location: New Brunswick
- Date apprehended: November 24, 1989
- Imprisoned at: Special Handling Unit (1991–2015); Edmonton Institution (2015–2026)

Allan Joseph Legere (February 13, 1948 – March 9, 2026), known as the Monster of the Miramichi, was a Canadian rapist, arsonist, and serial killer. In 1986, he participated in a home invasion against an elderly couple that ended with the death of the husband and the sexual assault of the wife, for which he was sentenced to prison. In 1989, he escaped custody while receiving medical treatment and attacked people over the course of months, killing four of them. He was recaptured and convicted of the subsequent murders; he died in custody in 2026.

== Early life ==
Allan Legere was born on February 13, 1948, in Chatham, New Brunswick.

== First murder ==
On the evening of June 21, 1986, Legere and two accomplices, Todd Matchett and Scott Curtis, robbed a home in Black River Bridge, New Brunswick. After cutting the power, the trio broke into the building where they were met by the owners, an elderly couple, John and Mary Glendenning. The couple was severely beaten and Mary was sexually assaulted. The trio then fled the scene. Mary Glendenning regained consciousness and discovered that her husband had been beaten to death; she crawled up the stairs to the phone and dialled 911. The dispatcher spoke with her on the phone until police arrived. Police tracked down the perpetrators and arrested them. Matchett pleaded guilty to murdering John Glendenning and beating his wife; Curtis and Legere were convicted at trial.

== Escape from hospital ==
Legere was serving his murder sentence at the Atlantic Institution maximum security penitentiary in Renous-Quarryville, under the responsibility of the Correctional Service of Canada (CSC). On May 3, 1989, he was transported by CSC personnel from the penitentiary to the Dr. Georges-L.-Dumont Regional Hospital in Moncton, New Brunswick, for the treatment of an ear infection. Legere managed to convince the CSC personnel to let him use a washroom at the hospital alone, and there he picked the lock on his handcuffs. He had concealed a sharpened piece of metal in his rectum, and was able to pick the lock on his handcuffs and hold the officers at bay before fleeing the building. Legere escaped the hospital property and through a combination of carjacking and motor vehicle theft, was able to evade recapture.

== More murders and eventual capture ==
Legere was at large from May 3, 1989, until November 24, 1989. During this period, four murders occurred in the Miramichi area.

On the night of May 28, 1989, Nina Flam was awakened by Legere who bound her hands with nylon rope, threatened her with a knife, and tried to strangle her, later beating and raping her, and forcing her into performing other sexual acts. Legere also murdered her sister Annie Flam, breaking her jaw and setting fire to the apartment in Chatham.

The next two murders occurred in Newcastle on October 13, 1989. Donna Daughney's body was found "tucked" in her bed and Linda Daughney's body was found on the floor in Donna's bedroom. Legere set two fires in the home, the first set in Linda's room and the other in Donna's closet. Donna died from "the beating she sustained, as well as from aspirating her own vomit", and that Linda Daughney had "puncture holes or knife wounds", "both her jaws were broken", and that she "had been partly strangled".

The next murder occurred on November 15, 1989, in Chatham Head. This homicide was of Father James Smith, a priest, who lived in the rectory near Nativity of the Blessed Virgin Mary Catholic Church. When he did not show up for services on November 16, parishioners checked the rectory and found Father Smith dead.

On November 17, 1989, a VIA Rail agent sold Legere a ticket for a day-nighter to Montreal, Quebec, on the 8:28pm train. A Quebec provincial police officer also later identified Legere as having been aboard the train. The officer conducted a search of the train in Quebec City but did not detain Legere, as he did not have a photograph of him and was relying on information that the suspect had a tattoo. The officer did not observe the tattoo at the time and allowed the train to continue.

On November 23, 1989, taxi driver Ron Gomke picked up Legere in Saint John, New Brunswick, who pointed a sawed off .308 rifle at him and told him to head towards Moncton. On the way to Moncton, the taxi spun off the highway due to snowy conditions and after off-duty RCMP officer, Cst. Michelle Mercer, stopped for the two men, Legere and Gomke got in the back of her vehicle and Legere held her hostage, forcing her to continue driving. After stopping for gas in Sussex, Gomke and Mercer managed to escape in the taxi, leaving Legere stranded until he found a trucker Brian Golding at the gas station and forced him to continue the trip in his semi-trailer.

After travelling throughout the night, Legere directed Golding to head past Moncton toward Newcastle along Route 126. After turning onto the Barnaby River Road, another trucker spotted their truck on the road and knew that it was not a road permitted for truckers and called the police on his CB radio. RCMP officers caught up with the truck on Route 118 approximately 10 km from Newcastle and Legere was arrested without incident.

== Trial and conviction ==
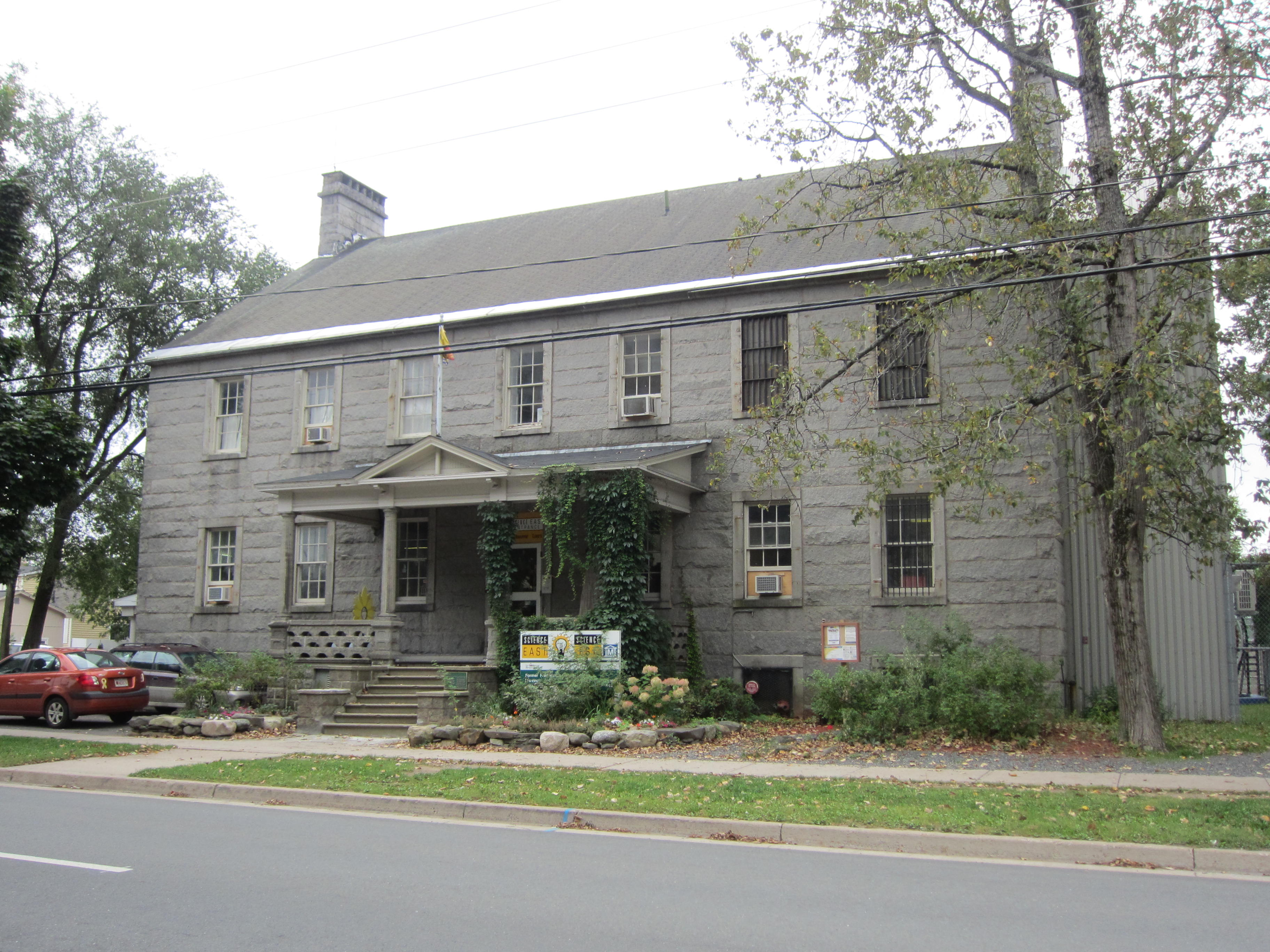
Legere was held in York County Jail in downtown Fredericton during his 1990–91 trial. In 1999, the 157-year-old jail was repurposed as Science East, a local science museum.

In August 1990, Legere was convicted on charges pertaining to his escape, and sentenced to an additional nine years. His trial for the murders began with an indictment in November of that year. Legere's trial featured the first Canadian uses of DNA profiling to convict rather than exonerate; in November 1991, Legere was convicted of the four murders committed while he had been at large.

== Imprisonment and death ==
In 1996, the provincial jail in Fredericton was shut down, and in 1999 the building was repurposed into a science museum; the cell in which Legere was held during his 1991 trial was used for an exhibit on DNA profiling.

In 2015, Legere was transferred from the super-maximum security penitentiary (the "SHU", in Sainte-Anne-des-Plaines, Quebec) to the Edmonton Institution in Alberta.

In August 2020, Legere applied for day parole. Although the parole board notice did not guarantee he would be granted day parole, the request raised concerns in the Miramichi community. Legere was scheduled for a parole hearing on January 13, 2021, where he was denied. Legere was once again denied parole on December 12, 2025.

Legere died on March 9, 2026, at the age of 78, while in custody at Edmonton Institution.

== See also ==
- List of serial killers by country
