= Canadian Criminal Justice Association =

Canadian justice advocacy organization

The Canadian Criminal Justice Association (CCJA) is a national, voluntary organization founded in 1919, dedicated to improving Canada's justice system. Its office is in Ottawa.

According to the organization's statement of purpose: "Recognizing that the criminal justice system must serve the needs of all people, the Canadian Criminal Justice Association is an umbrella organization representing all elements of the criminal justice system, including the public. It exists to promote rational, informed, and responsible debate in order to develop a more humane, equitable, and effective justice system."

It works at the national level, in partnership with affiliates in nine of the Canadian provinces.

== History ==
=== Achievements ===
The association has long served an advisory role to the federal government, submitting numerous briefs on proposed legislation. Its submissions have been influential in the drafting of major pieces of criminal legislation in Canada, including the Youth Criminal Justice Act and the Canadian Criminal Code.

The association's executive secretary, Bill McGrath, was appointed to the Ouimet Committee in 1964, which showed a strong relationship between the association and the federal government. The committee's findings were highly influential, and led to significant changes in Canadian justice policy, such as the abolition of corporal punishment in prisons, and the creation of the "dangerous offender" designation in the Criminal Code. Members of the association had previously contributed to the Archambault Commission, another justice-reform body created in 1936, with some of those recommendations also being reflected in subsequent legislation.

The association played a leading role in the creation of the Department of Criminology at the University of Ottawa in 1967. Association member Tadeusz Grygier served as the department's first chairperson, and an undergraduate scholarship now exists in his name.

=== Name changes ===
The CCJA was founded in 1919, as the Canadian Prisoners' Welfare Association. In 1936 it changed its name to the Canadian Penal Association, a move which was "largely the outcome of the great interest aroused in penal affairs following the penitentiary riots of the early thirties," according to association secretary John Kidman.

In 1956, when the Canadian Penal Association merged with the Canadian Welfare Association Division on Crime & Delinquency. The resulting organization, named the Canadian Corrections Association, remained a division of the Canadian Welfare Association.

In 1970, the organization was reconstituted again, as the Canadian Criminology and Corrections Association, reflecting the expansion of criminology as a discipline in Canadian universities. The name change came with a new structure: It now had a board of directors and a more distant relationship with the Canadian Welfare Association (it became an "affiliated organization" rather than a division).

The association became fully independent in 1977, rebranding itself the Canadian Association for the Prevention of Crime. However, that name would change again seven years later, when in 1984 it became the Canadian Criminal Justice Association.

== Publications and events ==
The CCJA publishes the Canadian Journal of Criminology and Criminal Justice, a quarterly, peer-reviewed academic journal produced in association with the University of Toronto Press. The journal was first published in 1958.

The CCJA also produces the Justice Report, a quarterly magazine of "matters related to the administration of justice in Canada." The Justice Report began life as the association's newsletter and has been in publication, under various names, since 1948.

The Canadian Congress on Criminal Justice is organized every two years by the CCJA. The first event was held in 1929 in Toronto, with the most recent, 36th edition, held again in Toronto.
