= William Thomas McGrath =

William Thomas McGrath (1918 – September 30, 1999) was the longest-serving executive director of the Canadian Criminal Justice Association from 1951 to 1982.

== Early life and career ==
McGrath was born in 1918 in Pointe-du-Chêne, New Brunswick, to William McGrath and Maude McGrath (née Tucker). McGrath earned a bachelor's degree from Mount Allison University in Sackville, New Brunswick, before entering the Canadian Armed Forces in 1941; he then served as a Captain with the New Brunswick Division of Carleton and York Regiment, was wounded in the Battle of Rome and became a decorated war hero.

While in Italy, McGrath served on a number of military courts-martial "as both a judge, prosecutor, and defense attorney." His experience in courts made him question the value of a punitive approach to justice; later, he pursued a master's degree in social work upon his return from the war (he wanted to study criminology, but said no program was available in Canada at the time). Upon graduating with a master's from the University of Toronto, he worked for the Department of Public Welfare in Nova Scotia.

== Canadian Corrections/Criminal Justice Association ==
In 1951, McGrath joined the Canadian Welfare Council as an executive director. On February 1, 1956, he was named executive director of the newly formed Canadian Corrections Association, which was the result of a merger of the council's Division on Crime and Delinquency and the Canadian Penal Association; the new association remained a division of the Canadian Welfare Council.

McGrath served as secretary and member of the Special Committee on Corrections (better known as the Ouimet Committee for its chairman, Quebec Superior Court Justice Roger Ouimet), which was appointed in 1964 by then-Canadian Minister of Justice Guy Favreau "to study the broad field of corrections, in its widest sense and to recommend … what changes, if any, should be made in the law and practice relating to these matters." Among many other findings, the committee's final report in 1969 recommended the complete abolition of corporal punishment in Canada; the practice was banned by the Canadian Parliament three years later.

While serving on the committee, McGrath produced the anthology textbook Crime and Its Treatment in Canada; it was "addressed primarily to university students in the various disciplines involved in the control of illegal behaviour, such as criminology, law, medicine, psychology, social work, sociology, and theology, and to students in the many in-service training-courses offered by the police and correctional services across the country." It was reprinted five times between 1965 and 1980. The book contained a chapter by Frank P. Miller, who would later serve as president of the Canadian Corrections Association.

== Retirement ==
McGrath retired from the association (then called the Canadian Criminology and Corrections Association) in 1982. At the time, Association President Gillian Sandeman remarked: "When it was left to Bill McGrath to chart his path, he chose a route for which the guideposts have been his professional skills, his knowledge of the criminal justice process and a deeply humane philosophy of life: his goal has always been crime prevention in its widest sense."

== Personal life ==
McGrath was married to Flora MacDonald Wilkie. Together, they had 3 children: Patricia Feasey (from Wilkie's previous marriage), Jefferson Christine and Canadian activist Maude Barlow.
