= Science East =

Coordinates: 45.9585°N 66.6390°W

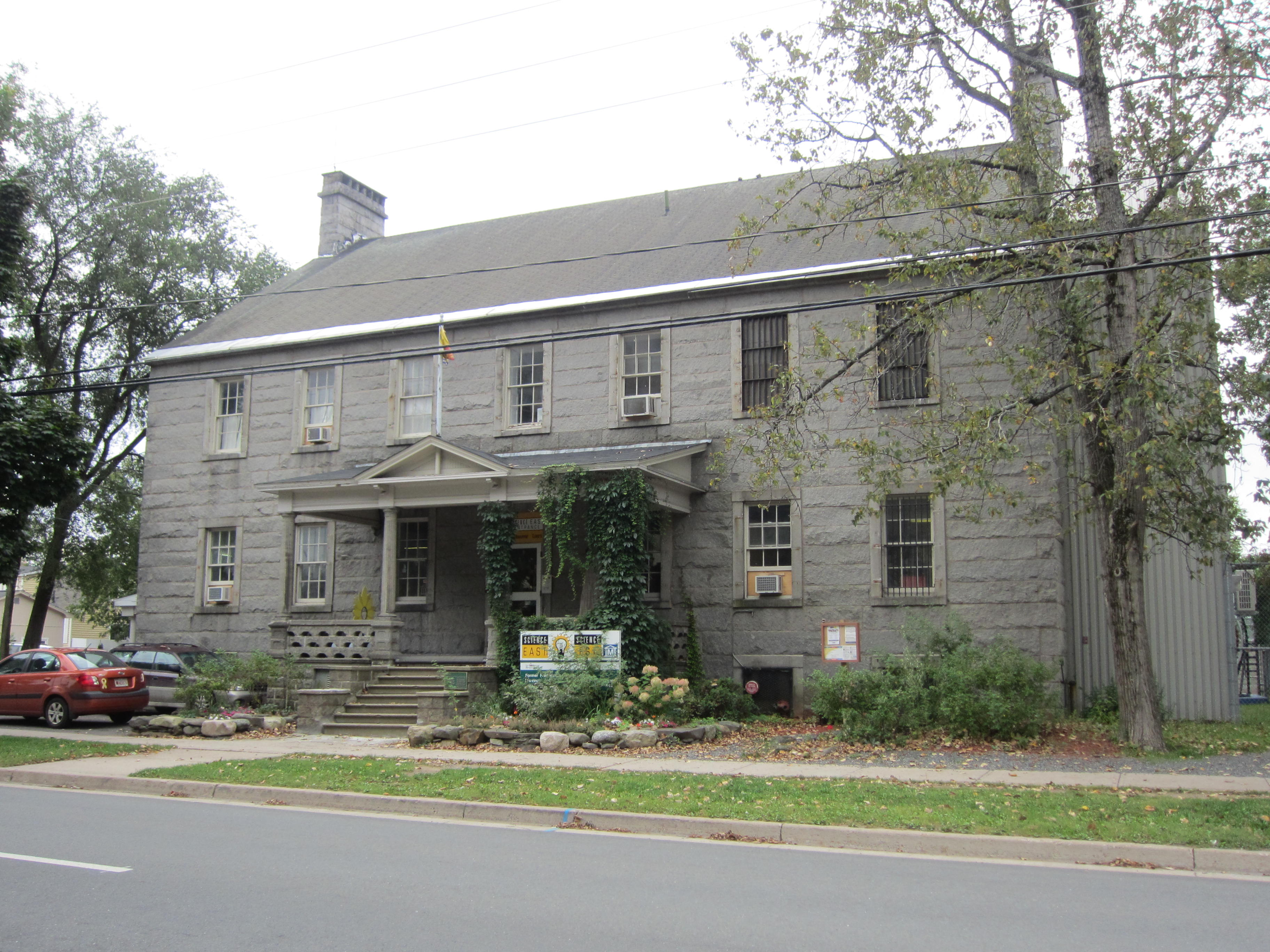
- Science East was located in the former York County Jail from 1999 to 2024.
- Established: 1994
- Location: Fredericton, New Brunswick, Canada
- Type: Science education organization
- Website: Official website

Science East is a charitable science education organization based in Fredericton, New Brunswick, Canada. Founded in 1994, it provides science, technology, engineering and mathematics (STEM) education through school programs, travelling exhibits, a portable digital planetarium, teacher professional learning, workshops, and community outreach throughout New Brunswick. From 1999 until 2024, Science East operated an interactive science centre in the former York County Jail in downtown Fredericton.

== History ==
Science East was founded in 1994 as New Brunswick's first interactive science centre. In 1999, it relocated to the former York County Jail, a historic building constructed in 1842. The science centre combined interactive exhibits with interpretation of the building's history.

Over time, the organization expanded its activities beyond the museum by offering curriculum-linked school programs, travelling exhibits, STEM workshops, teacher professional learning, summer camps, and outreach programs across New Brunswick.

In February 2024, Science East temporarily closed its museum because of financial and operational challenges while continuing province-wide educational programming.

In July 2024, the organization announced plans to sell the York County Jail property to help secure its long-term future and pursue a new permanent science centre. The property was sold later that year, and Science East relocated to temporary offices while continuing its outreach programming.

== Programs ==
Science East delivers science education programs throughout New Brunswick, including classroom workshops, travelling exhibits, STEM activity kits, public science events, teacher professional learning, and outreach programming. The organization also operates a portable digital planetarium that brings astronomy programming to schools and communities across the province.

Science East presents public events including March Break SciFest in partnership with community organizations.

== Affiliations ==
The museum is affiliated with the Canadian Museums Association and the Virtual Museum of Canada.
