= Healing lodge =

Type of Canadian correctional institution

A healing lodge is a Canadian correctional institution designed to meet the needs of Indigenous (First Nations, Métis, and Inuit) inmates. Healing lodges were created to address the concern that traditional prisons do not work on Indigenous offenders. Indigenous people are over-represented in the prison system and are also more likely to be the victims of crime. In healing lodges, the focus is on healing and reconnecting with indigenous culture while inmates serve their sentences. Connecting to nature, participating in cultural ceremonies, and learning spiritual teachings are how Healing Lodges process the rehabilitation and healing of inmates. They also have access to spiritual guidance from Elders and are encouraged to maintain connections with their families and communities. Healing lodges were proposed as an alternative for Indigenous female offenders, but there are now healing lodges for Indigenous male offenders as well. Women's healing lodges are minimum / medium-security facilities, and men's healing lodges are minimum-security facilities.

== History ==
In 1990, a report called Creating Choices was issued by a task force aiming to improve the lives of and create more choices for federally sentenced women. One of the recommendations of the task force was the creation of a healing lodge "where Indigenous federally sentenced women may serve all or part of their sentences". This idea was proposed by the Native Women's Association of Canada. Section 81 of the Corrections and Conditional Release Act of 1992 made it possible for Indigenous communities and Correctional Service Canada (CSC) to work together to provide services, programs, and correctional facilities to Indigenous inmates. Notably, it allows Indigenous communities to provide correctional services to Indigenous inmates.

== Types of healing lodges ==
There are two types of healing lodges: CSC-run healing lodges and Section 81 healing lodges. CSC-run healing lodges are funded and operated entirely by the CSC. In contrast, Section 81 healing lodges are healing lodges operating under section 81 of the Corrections and Conditional Release Act, which provides the basis for CSC to enter into agreements to operate healing lodges with Indigenous communities. These healing lodges, unlike CSC-run healing lodges, are funded by CSC but entirely managed by Indigenous communities or partner organizations.

There are six Section 81 healing lodges as of 2022, located in Alberta, Manitoba, Quebec and Saskatchewan. Additionally, there are four CSC-run healing lodges in Alberta, British Columbia and Saskatchewan. Healing lodges are not available in other provinces or territories due to the lack of relevant agreements.

== Success ==
Healing lodges have shown signs of success. According to the Correctional Service of Canada, Indigenous people who served their sentences in a healing lodge had a re-offense rate of only 6% compared to a re-offense rate of 11% for the general population. In addition, Indigenous offenders who participated in the "Pathways" program (an Indigenous targeted prison program) had a lower re-offense rate and were "less likely to be involved in violent incidents [with staff] and more likely to complete parole after release".

== Criticisms ==
=== Accessibility and Availability ===
One of the major criticisms of healing lodges is that they only service a small percentage of the approximately 3,500 Indigenous people incarcerated in Canada. As of 2011, Section 81 healing lodges had a total capacity of only 68 bed spaces and CSC run healing lodges had a capacity of 194. This means that healing lodges can only accommodate 262 inmates. Furthermore, as of 2011, healing lodges were not operating at full capacity. It is possible that one of the reasons healing lodges do not operate at full capacity is the policy of only accepting minimum or low risk medium-security inmates despite the original intention for healing lodges to accept prisoners of all security levels and for prisoners to have access to these facilities from the time they were sentenced. This limits the number of Indigenous inmates who have access to healing lodges. For example, only 11.3% of male Indigenous offenders were classed as minimum-security. Accepting only low-security inmates has the effect of barring the majority of the incarcerated male Indigenous population from accessing healing lodges. According to the Office of the Correctional Investigator in 2011, "No new Section 81 facility has been added since 2001, despite a 40% increase in Indigenous incarceration." (O-chi-chak-ko-sipi re-opened in 2003, but was founded in 2000; Buffalo Sage Wellness House opened in 2011, but "is an expansion of an existing agreement"). As of 2024, only one new section 81 lodge has opened, with a capacity of 30 beds: Eagle Women's Lodge (opened in 2019). The last CSC-operated lodge opened in 2003.

CSC has responded to these criticisms by stating that healing lodges are only one of several strategies in Indigenous corrections. "Elders and [Indigenous] Liaison Officers are available in all institutions, and [Indigenous] Correctional Programs, [Indigenous] Community Development Officers, and [Indigenous] Community Liaison Officers are in place in all regions, ensuring that offenders have support throughout their sentence, not only when they are placed in a section 81 healing lodge." The Pathways initiative (a program designed "to reinforce a traditional [Indigenous] way of life through more intensive one-to-one counselling, increased ceremonial access, and an increased ability to follow a more traditional [Indigenous] healing path consistent with [Indigenous] traditional values and beliefs") has been established in both men's and women's institutions at all security levels.

=== Funding issues ===
Comparing to CSC-run healing lodges, funding for Section 81 healing lodges is more unstable. In 2009–2010, CSC allocated $21,555,037 for CSC lodges and $4,819,479 for section 81 lodges. This discrepancy in funding means that Section 81 lodges must pay their employees 50% less and may be unable to provide adequate training. According to the Office of the Correctional Investigator, the original intent was for CSC lodges to eventually be transferred to the control of Indigenous communities. Presently there are no negotiations in place to transfer the control of CSC healing lodges. There is also "the perception among some Section 81 Healing Lodge staff and CSC officials that CSC-operated Healing Lodges are in competition with Section 81 Healing Lodges for minimum security inmates".

=== Relationship with Indigenous communities ===
Expansion of section 81 healing lodges is contingent upon acceptance by Indigenous communities. Indigenous communities are not always willing or able to take on the responsibility of a healing lodge. Reasons for hesitation include lack of resources and concerns for the safety of the community. Critics question the "responsibilization" of Indigenous communities and question whether the burden of rehabilitating Indigenous offenders should be placed on Indigenous communities.

In the article When Two Worlds Collide, authors explore the contradictory way Indigenous communities are viewed by CSC in regards to risk assessment. Identification with Indigenous identity and involvement with the Indigenous Community prior to incarceration are viewed as risk enhancing factors. At the same time, CSC prescribed Indigenous programming and contact with the Indigenous community during incarceration are seen as a risk reducing factors.

== List of CSC-run healing lodges ==
Alberta

- Pê Sâkâstêw Centre, in Maskwacis (for minimum security men)

British Columbia

- Kwìkwèxwelhp Healing Village, in Harrison Mills (for minimum security men)

Saskatchewan

- Okimaw Ohci Healing Lodge, in Maple Creek (for minimum / medium security women)
- Willow Cree Healing Lodge, in Duck Lake (for minimum security men)

== List of Section 81 healing lodges ==
Alberta

- Stan Daniels Healing Centre, in Edmonton (for minimum security men and offenders on conditional release)
- Buffalo Sage Wellness House, in Edmonton (for minimum / medium security women and women on conditional release)

Manitoba

- Eagle Women's Lodge
- Ochi-chak-ko-sipi Healing Lodge in Crane River (for minimum security men)

Quebec

- Waseskun Healing Centre, in Saint-Alphonse-Rodriguez (for minimum security men and offenders on conditional release)

Saskatchewan

- Prince Albert Grand Council Spiritual Healing Lodge (for minimum security men)

== See also ==
- Gladue report
- Correctional Service Canada
- Incarceration in Canada
- Waseskun, a 2016 documentary film about the Waseskun healing lodge in Quebec
