= Vancouver Island Regional Correctional Centre =

Prison in Victoria, Canada

Coordinates: 48°28′57″N 123°24′37″W

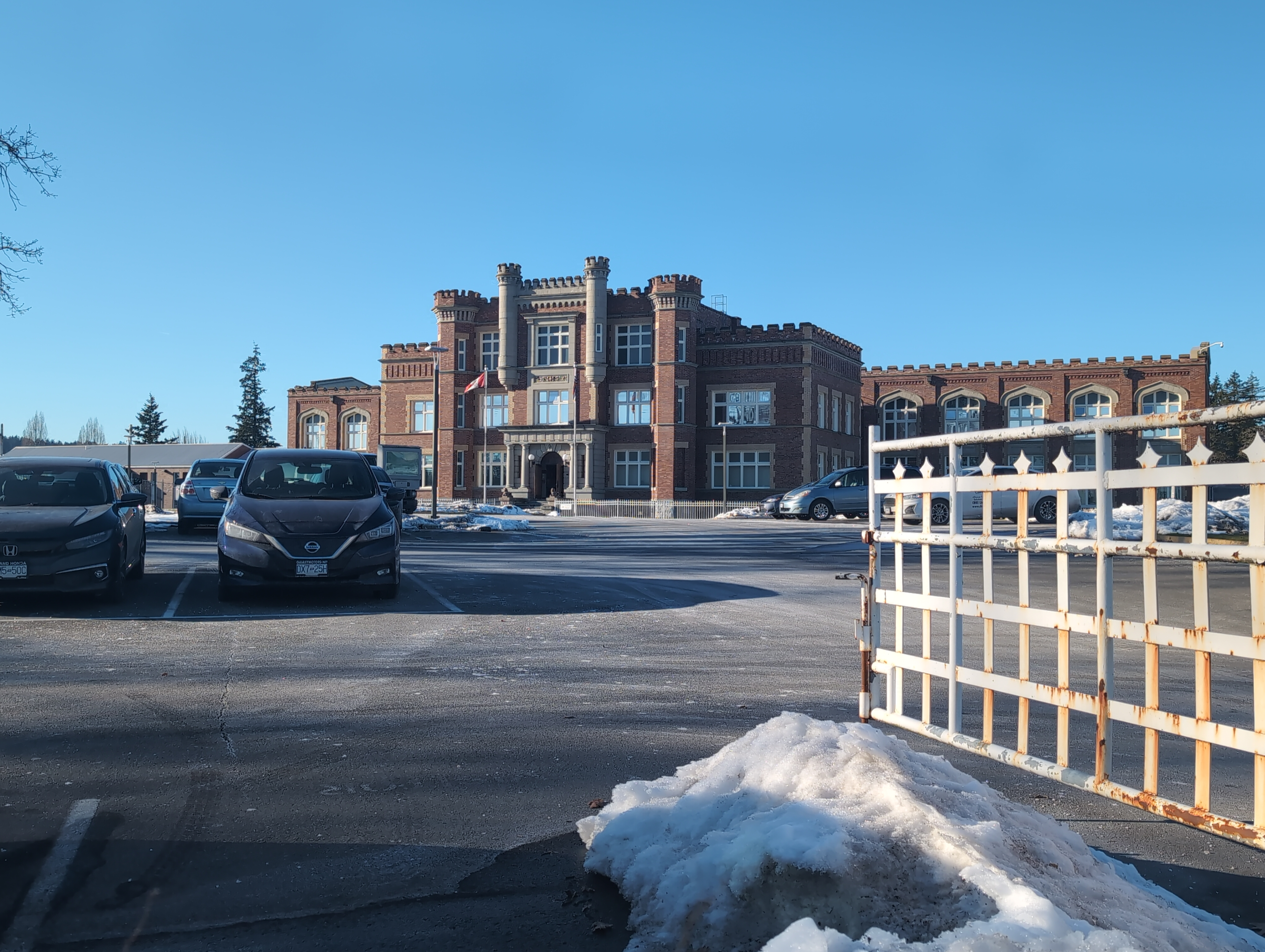
- Interactive map of Vancouver Island Regional Correctional Centre
- Location: Saanich, British Columbia
- Population: 300 (Sep 27, 2013)
- Opened: September 12, 1914
- Former name: Wilkinson Road Jail Colquitz Gaol Saanich Prison Farm (1913-16) Colquitz Centre for the Criminally Insane (1916-1954) Provincial Government Pheasant Farm (1918-1919) Colquitz Provincial Mental Home (1919-1964) Oakalla Prison Farm, Vancouver Island Unit (1964-1966) Vancouver Island Regional Correctional Centre (1966-present)
- Warden: Sukhdeep Saini

The Vancouver Island Regional Correctional Centre (VIRCC), commonly referred to as “Wilki” by locals is a Regional Correctional Centre that is located in the District Municipality of Saanich, Vancouver Island, British Columbia, Canada. It lies within metropolitan Victoria, British Columbia, in its northwest suburbs. The centre offers grief counseling to the family members of prisoners' deceased victims. It originally was the Colquitz Mental hospital from 1919 to 1964 when it became part of the Oakalla Prison Farm.

== History ==
With a construction budget of $100,000, the facility - designed by architect Col. William Ridgeway Wilson - officially opened on September 13, 1913 as the Saanich Prison Farm to 38 inmates with room for 180 with the first prison warden, John Monroe, living on the grounds with his family. The prison primarily housed prisoners of war and offenders of the Naval Discipline Act during the First World War. There was at least one execution at the facility, with the most famous case being Robert Suttie who was hanged on January 15, 1915 for shooting and killing his foreman, Richard Hargreaves. From 1919 until 1964, it operated as Colquitz Mental Hospital. In 1929, the site operated as a farm, producing 9000 eggs/week and a heard of 300 cattle until the Provincial Gaol Service and Parole Branch united to form the BC Corrections branch in 1970. The facility was then rebranded as the Vancouver Island Regional Correctional Center and reverted to its original use as a correctional centre. In 1981, the facility was recognized as a Canadian historic site. In 1985, the facility completed a $24 Million dollar renovation, mostly focussing on the interior of the building, leaving nothing behind from the original but the heritage facade.

== Incidents ==
On October 26, 1977, approximately 20 inmates took a prison officer hostage with a knife, but released him peacefully the next day. A prison riot at Prince George Regional Correctional Centre on April 26, 1983 led to ten prisoners being transferred to VIRCC. A prison riot at VIRCC in January 1985 led to 37 prisoners appearing before a disciplinary review board. On March 26, 2005, five inmates were charged with mischief after having together caused between $40,000 and $50,000 worth of damage to a living unit at the centre. In September 2006, David Johnston, a homeless man imprisoned at the VIRCC due to repeated sleeping on Beacon Hill Park and St. Ann's Academy property, went on a hunger strike to fight for the right to sleep outdoors and was supported by other homeless people who created a tent city. On February 22, 2007, inmate Wayne Allan Turner was found dead in the centre, hanging from a fire sprinkler head. British Columbia Government and Service Employees' Union corrections and sheriff services component chairman Dean Purdy stated in March 2010 that there had been 63 assaults on the centre's guards by inmates since 2003 when the jail became overcrowded due to the closing of nine other British Columbia jails. An attempted prison escape by two prisoners was foiled in July 2011.
