= Central Nova Scotia Correctional Facility =

Prison in Nova Scotia, Canada

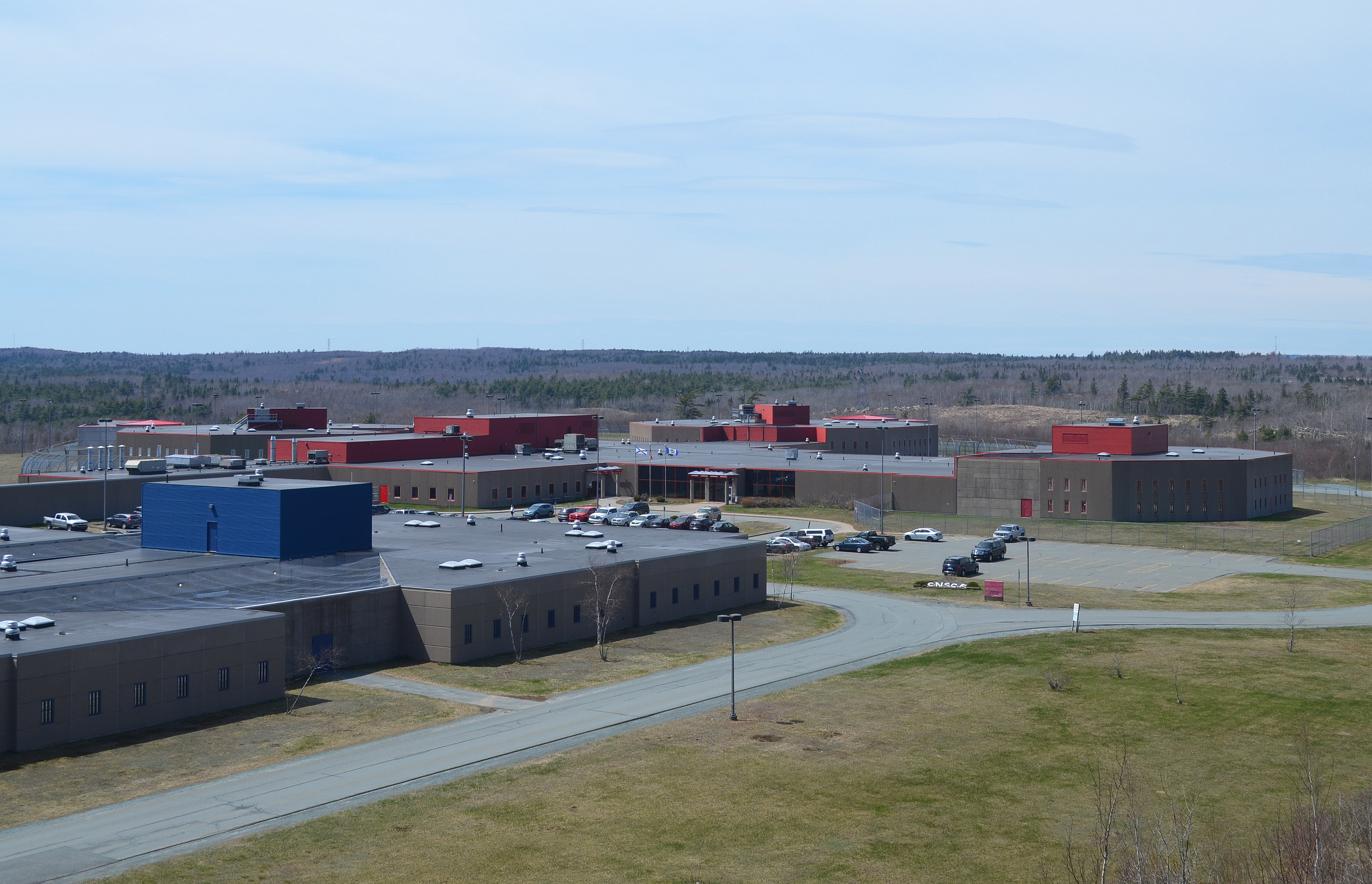
- Central Nova Scotia Correctional Facility
- Interactive map of Central Nova Scotia Correctional Facility
- Location: Halifax Regional Municipality; 44.72178°N 63.592386°W
- Status: Operational
- Security class: Varies
- Capacity: 370
- Population: 300+ (12 January 2009)
- Opened: October 2001
- Managed by: Province of Nova Scotia

The Central Nova Scotia Correctional Facility is a Canadian prison located in Nova Scotia's Halifax Regional Municipality.

== Facilities ==
Situated in the Burnside Industrial Park in Dartmouth, the Central Nova Scotia Correctional Facility is the largest provincial jail in Nova Scotia, having a capacity of 370 (322 male, 48 female). It was built at the same time as the adjacent East Coast Forensic Hospital which is not open to the general public, serving only patients coming from the justice system. This arrangement is unique in Canada and allows the two institutions to share laundry, cooking, and recreational facilities as well as security staff.

== History ==
Central Nova Scotia Correctional Facility replaces three former prisons located in Halifax County (Lower Sackville), Colchester County (Truro), and Kings County (Kentville), all of which closed in 2001. Originally construction had begun at Jack Lake, near the Bedford Rifle Range. Although surrounded by forest and far more isolated than the current site, affluent Bedford residents balked at the plan. In response, construction was halted and the province announced in October 1999 that the new site in Burnside had been chosen.

It was designed by the Halifax architectural firms of John K. Dobbs and Associates and William Nycum and Associates Ltd. Construction took approximately two years and was carried out by Tidewater Construction Ltd.
