= Saskatoon Provincial Correctional Centre =

Provincial Correctional Centre In Saskatoon

- Interactive map of Saskatoon Provincial Correctional Centre
- Location: Saskatoon, Saskatchewan, Canada; 52°11′17.55″N 106°38′42.41″W
- Status: Operational
- Security class: Provincial correctional institution
- Capacity: 320
- Opened: 1981
- Managed by: Saskatchewan Ministry of Corrections, Public Safety and Policing

The Saskatoon Provincial Correctional Centre is an adult male, provincial correctional centre located in Saskatoon, Saskatchewan, Canada. It is one of four provincial correctional centres in the province including the Regina Correctional Centre, the Prince Albert Correctional Centre and the only female institution, the Pine Grove Correctional Centre. The centre generally holds approximately 450 offenders, including those of the low security annex, the Saskatoon Urban Camp.

The centre holds alleged offenders that are currently awaiting trial (remanded) and those who are sentenced. As a provincial correctional centre, sentenced inmates serve a maximum of two years, less a day. Those who are sentenced to more than that are transferred to the Correctional Service of Canada (CSC). However, there are instances where federal inmates are sentenced to a provincial correctional centre, as the province of Saskatchewan has an exchange of services agreement with the CSC.

As all provincial offenders will be released into the community, the goal of the correctional system is to prepare offenders for a successful reintegration into the community. This is often done by offering a wide variety of programming including alcohol and drug programming, anger management, cognitive skills, psychological counseling, spiritual counseling and traditional aboriginal programming.

== History ==
The centre was opened in 1981, along with the new Prince Albert Correctional centre, after the old men’s jail in Prince Albert was closed down due to a serious riot in the late 1970s. The centre was originally built along the lines of the Normal Living Unit concept in which offenders were housed in a manner that resembled a “half-way house” in the community but with the structure of a secure setting.
