= Archambault report =

1938 Canadian prison reform report

Royal Commission to Investigate the Penal System of Canada
- Also known as: Archambault Commission
- Commissioners: Joseph Archambault (Chair); Richard Craig; James Chalmers McRuer; Harry W. Anderson (died 1936)
- Inquiry period: February 27, 1936 – 1938
- Authorized: Order in Council P.C. 483

The Archambault Report was an influential study of the penitentiary system in Canada, published in 1938. It is widely recognized as Canada's preeminent document on prison reform in that it changed the focus in Canadian prisons from retributive justice to rehabilitation.

The report presented the findings of a four-year public inquiry by the Royal Commission to Investigate the Penal System of Canada, or the Archambault Commission, a royal commission chaired by Justice Joseph Archambault that ran from 1936 to 1938. The commission had been formed in response to a series of riots and strikes in Canadian prisons in the 1930s. Commissioners included Harry W. Anderson, Richard W. Craig, James Chalmers McRuer.

The report proposed sweeping changes for Canadian penitentiaries, emphasizing crime prevention and the rehabilitation of prisoners. Included among the 88 recommendations were a complete revision of penitentiary regulations to provide "strict but humane discipline and the reformation and rehabilitation of prisoners." While the commission's recommendations were not immediately implemented due to the advent of World War II, much of the report's philosophy remains influential.
