= Edmonton Institution =

Prison in Alberta, Canada

- Interactive map of Edmonton Institution
- Location: Edmonton, Alberta, Canada; 53°40′37″N 113°20′18″W
- Status: Operational
- Security class: Maximum
- Capacity: 324
- Population: ~299 (July 2013)
- Opened: 1978
- Managed by: Correctional Services Canada
- Warden: Mark Shantz
- Website: Edmonton Institution Profile

Notable prisoners
- Harvey Andres (1981 - ?); Omar Khadr (May 2013 – February 2014); Allan Legere (2015-2026); Jeremy Allan Steinke (2006-present)

The Edmonton Institution (French: Établissement d'Edmonton) is a maximum security federal institution located in the northeastern part of Edmonton, Alberta. It is operated by Correctional Service of Canada. It is part of the Prairie Regions institutions, the Regional Headquarters of which is located in Saskatoon, Saskatchewan.

== Riots ==
There have been 6 riots since the prison opened.

- January 24, 1986

A riot broke out in the yard after a fellow inmate was not released from solitary confinement. Fires were set and the Pharmacy was broken into, and several inmates overdosed. Lasted about five hours; no deaths were reported.

- August 31, 1998

After a stabbing, some inmates started fires, broke windows and attacked a guard. The prison was on lock-down for most of the day.

- November 13, 2001

A group of inmates started a riot in the gym, attacking and stabbing other inmates. They refused to return to the cells and began damaging the gym and set the bleachers on fire.

- August 27, 2003

A small riot broke out after an inmate attacked a guard and was moved to solitary confinement. It was limited to one unit in the prison.

- February 10, 2004

Over $150,000 of damages were sustained after an inmate gained access to a unit unknowingly and began attacking a guard. The riot was contained to the single unit but 19 inmate with shivs and other hand made weapons destroyed much of the furniture and windows in the unit.

- July 1, 2008

One of the largest and the longest riot took place, after two rival gangs attacked each other. It took nine hours to gain control of the inmates again. During this time eight inmates were stabbed with homemade weapons, and one was shot after refusing to drop his weapon and continuing to attack another inmate. No deaths were reported.

== Escapes ==
There have been two successful escapes from the prison since it opened, both by the same inmate Harvey Andres.

- March 12, 1981

Harvey Andres escaped for the first time by fooling the guards with a dummy. He was able to get into a garbage can and escaped when a garbage truck transported it outside the facility. On April 19, 1981, Andres was caught after being wounded during a shoot-out with Calgary police and RCMP officers; an RCMP officer was also shot during the event.

- March 13, 1982

Harvey Andres escaped for a second time during a snowstorm with three others, but Andres was the only one to make it by cutting the fencing and getting away. He had gotten a hold of a handgun and wire cutters from a maintenance worker who was working on the fence earlier. He smuggled in parts of the gun and ammo in with motorcycle gas tanks and was able to create an improvised firearm. At large until July 6, 1982, Andres was recaptured after a similar shootout in Saskatoon, which left him wounded. A Saskatoon Police officer was struck in the abdomen and arm during the shoot-out.

== Notable inmates ==
- Omar Khadr

A former child soldier convicted of terrorism. Was transferred to the Edmonton Institution from Millhaven Institution due to numerous death threats from other inmates.

- Allan Legere

Serial killer and arsonist in New Brunswick.

- Jeremy Allan Steinke

Convicted of the 2006 murders of Marc, Debra and Jacob Richardson.

== See also ==
- Edmonton Remand Centre, a provincial run prison facility also in Edmonton.
