= Calgary Remand Centre =

Prison in Alberta, Canada

- Interactive map of Calgary Remand Centre
- Location: Calgary, Alberta, Canada; 51.1595°N 114.209°W
- Status: Operational
- Security class: Provincial Remand Centre
- Capacity: 684

Calgary Remand Centre (CRC) is a provincial correctional facility in Alberta, Canada. The facility is operated by the Ministry of the Justice Solicitor General of Alberta. The CRC remands inmates awaiting trial or sentencing. As of 2017, due to limited space only male inmates are housed in the facility, female inmates being housed in the neighboring Calgary Young Offenders Centre.

== History ==
Calgary Remand Centre was established 1993 with a capacity of 430. In 2005, it was renovated to house more inmates; in 2017, the capacity was listed as 704 inmates. As of 2017, CRC was scheduled for renovation due to over-crowding and problems concerning inmates' safety. CRC guards have taken strike action over health and safety allegations affecting them. These allegations have caused fewer guards to patrol the inmates. Meanwhile, CRC inmates have made hunger strikes over unhealthy conditions and mistreatment.

== Allegations ==
Allegations are regularly made against Calgary Remand Centre, although none have been proved. Most allegations concern sexual harassment by cellmates and by other inmates. Other common allegations concern attacks on other inmates. A case concerning an attack on a Russian citizen was not able to continue due to lack of evidence against other prisoners. Most alleged attacks have not been investigated.

In some cases alleged assault victims have been sent to the hospital for serious injuries, and one has required life support.

Deaths in CRC have included several suicides.

In 2017 it was alleged that convicted triple-murderer Douglas Garland was attacked by several inmates.
