= Aaqqigiarvik Correctional Healing Facility =

Prison in Nunavut, Canada

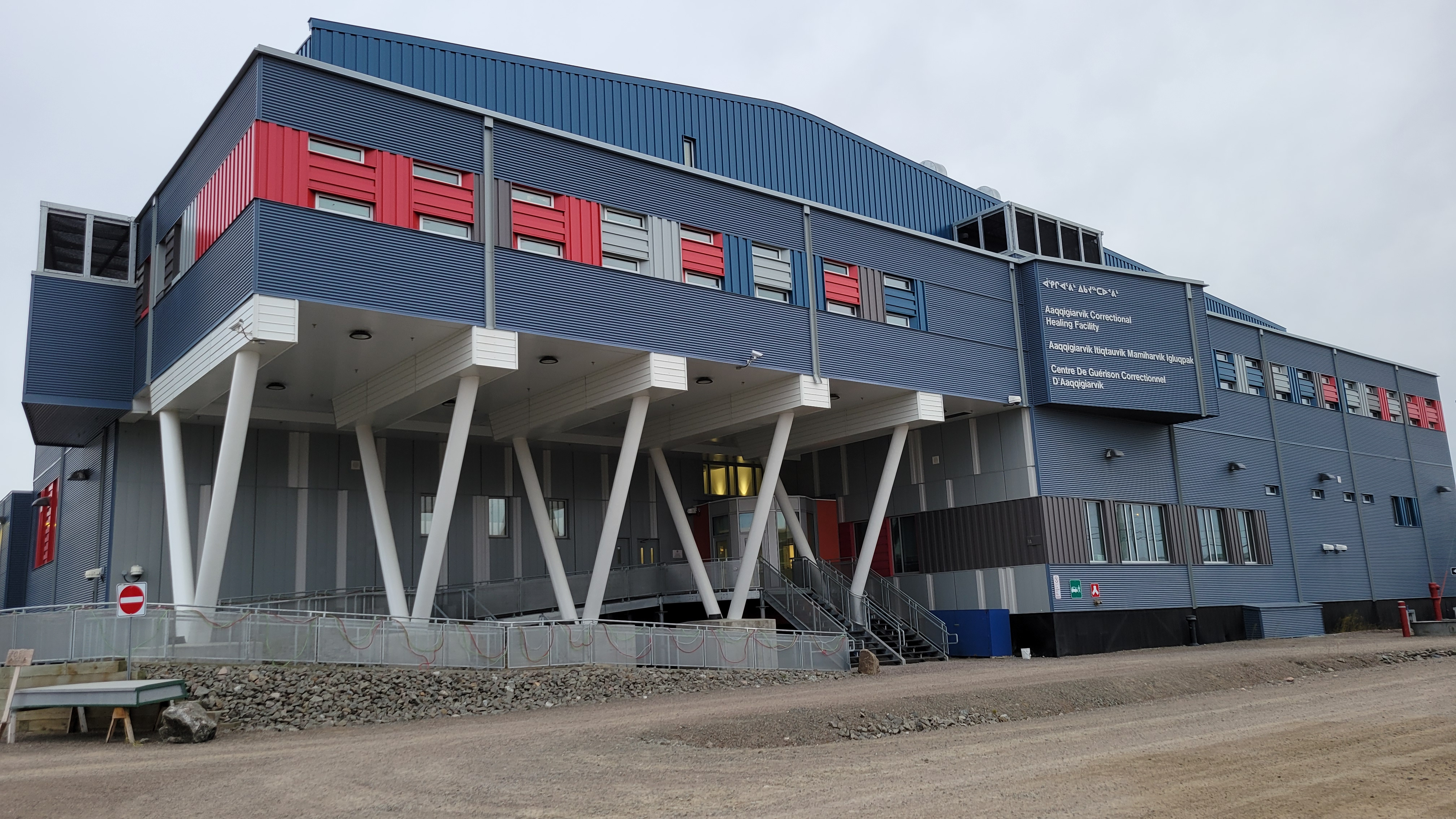
- Interactive map of Aaqqigiarvik Correctional Healing Facility
- Location: Iqaluit, Nunavut, Canada; 63.75915°N 68.54215°W
- Capacity: 143
- Opened: 1986
- Former name: Baffin Correctional Centre
- Managed by: Nunavut Department of Justice
- Warden: Wayne Buller

Aaqqigiarvik Correctional Healing Facility (formerly Baffin Correctional Centre) is a minimum to maximum security correctional facility in Iqaluit, Nunavut, Canada. It is the largest correctional facility in the territory. During the construction phase the temporary name was Qikiqtani Correctional Healing Centre.

== Baffin Correctional Centre ==
The facility was designed by Bruno Freschi and opened in 1986 as the Baffin Correctional Centre with an initial capacity of 41 inmates. After upgrades in 1996, the capacity was increased to 66 beds with two segregation cells. Additional renovations totalling $900,000 in the mid-2010s helped to remove pervasive mould, fix fire sprinklers, damaged walls, and decrepit bathrooms.

=== Prisoner care ===
Despite the increased capacity created in the 1990s, the number of inmates became routinely higher than capacity in the 2000s. Often with 75 prisoners, and with a peak during the winter of 115 inmates, with some sleeping in a repurposed gymnasium. These would include minimum-, medium- and maximum-security prisoners, as well as those on remand and awaiting trial. Between 2002 and 2012, reports of violence within the prison increased dramatically, with 185 incidents in 2012.

A report by federal auditor general Michael Ferguson noted that none of the 24 prisoners interviewed had considered a plan for rehabilitation, and just five per cent of inmates had release plan. Only a third of inmates with mental-health issues had relevant services. In 2014, Howard Sapers, a representative from the Office of the Correctional Investigator described the jail as "appalling" and called for its closure.

Renovations in the 2010s improved conditions, and the construction of the Makigiarvik Correction Centre in 2015 next door decreased overcrowding. However, overcrowding remained a problem in Nunavut, and the government admitted to paying $4 million per year for inmates to be housed outside the territory.

In 2017, prisoners started a short-lived riot, damaging large sections of the living quarters. Approximately 85 per cent of the medium security bed space and 33 per cent of the maximum security bed space was destroyed, but no one was injured beyond the use of pepper spray.

In June 2018, another riot broke out, causing "significant damage" to the "Charlie" unit of the prison, which houses between 20 and 30 inmates. The riot briefly involved a fire, which the inmates extinguished themselves.

== Rebuilding ==
In 2016, the government announced plans to rebuild the Baffin Correctional Centre at a total cost of $76 million, and rename it the Qikiqtani Correctional Healing Centre. The plans are to create a new two-storey maximum-security unit, while renovating the existing structures into two medium-security facilities.

The construction was set to begin in the summer of 2018, but the in May 2018, it was announced that the opening would be significantly delayed. The government announced that the request for proposals process was cancelled after only one company bid on the contract, and its bid was $7 million over the remaining budget for the project. Construction began in 2019 with an estimated completion date of 2022. It opened ahead of schedule in September of 2021.

Nunavut justice minister Jeannie Ehaloak announced in October 2020 that the final name Aaqqigiarvik Correctional Healing Facility had been chosen after consultation with Inuit elders and the territorial government's Tuttarviit Committee. The name "aaqqigiarvik" means "a place for help to make progress in life" in Inuktitut.
