= Regional Reception Centre =

Federal supermax-style prison in Quebec, Canada

- Interactive map of Regional Reception Centre
- Location: Sainte-Anne-des-Plaines, Quebec; 45°45′02″N 73°51′35″W
- Status: Active
- Security class: Multiple
- Capacity: 283
- Population: ?
- Opened: 1973
- Managed by: Corrections Canada
- Director: Warden

Special Handling Unit
- Interactive map of Special Handling Unit
- Location: Sainte-Anne-des-Plaines, Quebec; 45°45′02″N 73°51′35″W
- Status: Active
- Security class: Super Maximum
- Population: 90 (2008)
- Opened: 1984
- Managed by: Corrections Canada
- Director: Warden

The Regional Reception Centre (French: Centre régional de réception) is a Canadian federal prison for men located with Archambault Institution at the Correctional Service of Canada (CSC) complex at Sainte-Anne-des-Plaines, Quebec, a short distance from Mirabel International Airport.

The Special Handling Unit (SHU; French: Unité spéciale de détention or USD), within the centre, is Canada's highest security (supermax) prison. As of 2008, there were 90 prisoners at the SHU. In English it is nicknamed "the SHU" (pronounced 'shoe'), and in French it is the "USD".

The six-wing radial-shaped facility is surrounded by three rows of fencing, which is in turn surrounded by farms.

Inmates are always handcuffed in the presence of officers. When escorting inmates, officers are unarmed to prevent inadvertently placing a weapon in the vicinity of the prisoner. Escorting officers do carry pepper spray. Weapons and other equipment are carried by officers manning the elevated catwalk. Inmates must progress through programs in the SHU before being transferred back to the general population of other maximum security prisons; however, some inmates are considered to be too high-risk to be eligible for this and are detained in the SHU for longer periods.

== Notable inmates of the Special Handling Unit ==
=== Current inmates ===
Men:

- Shareef Abdelhaleem (conspirator of the 2006 Ontario terrorism plot)

=== Former inmates ===
Men:

- Allan Legere (serial killer, 1991–2015; transferred to Edmonton Institution)
- Clifford Olson (serial killer, 1982–2011; died of cancer on September 30, 2011)
- Ali Dirie (terrorist, 2009–2011; died in Syrian civil war)
- Luka Magnotta (murderer; transferred to Port-Cartier Institution, QC)
- Maurice Boucher (murderer, 2002–2022; died of cancer on July 10, 2022)

Women:

- Karla Homolka (serial killer, imprisoned 1993–2005, released after 12-year sentence); she was held at the Regional Reception Centre since March 2001 after being transferred from the Joliette Institution for Women. In 2003, she was scheduled to be moved into a maximum security wing at Joliette.

== See also ==
- Supermax prison, for an international overview of supermax prisons
