= North Slave Correctional Complex =

Building in Northwest Territories, Canada

- Interactive map of North Slave Correctional Complex
- Location: Yellowknife, Northwest Territories, Canada; 62.43586°N 114.40453°W
- Status: Operational
- Security class: Minimum to maximum
- Capacity: 148 (adult) + 25 (youth)
- Opened: 2004
- Managed by: Northwest Territories Department of Justice
- Website: justice.gov.nt.ca/en/north-slave-correctional-centre/

The North Slave Correctional Complex is a prison in Yellowknife, Northwest Territories, Canada and the largest correctional facility in the territory. It consists of an adult male unit and a youth unit, and it houses inmates with security ratings from minimum to maximum security, as well as those awaiting trial. Since the closure of the Arctic Tern Young Offender Facility in 2011, the youth unit holds both male and female young offenders.

== History ==
The complex is the result of the merger of the North Slave Correctional Centre and the North Slave Young Offender Facility in 2016. Previously, the two facilities were formally separate, though they were connected by a corridor and shared a gym.

The North Slave Lake Correctional Centre (now the Adult Male Unit) was built in 2004, replacing the Yellowknife Correctional Centre.

In 2015, the Auditor General of Canada's report on prisons in the Northwest Territories found that short-term prisoners in the complex were not receiving access to rehabilitation programs.

In August 2016, the prison had its first escape, when an inmate climbed a fence in the exercise yard, and onto the roof. Following the escape, the yard was closed to inmates, leaving them with less access to the outdoors or to cultural programs practiced there. In 2017, inmates began a letter writing campaign to demand better access to programs and recreational opportunities. On August 17, 2023, an evacuation of the City of Yellowknife caused an escort of all inmates at NSCC to transfer to the Edmonton Remand Centre.

== See also ==
- List of youth detention incidents in Canada
- Brookside Youth Centre
- Project Turnaround
- Bluewater Youth Centre
