= 2019 reasons of the Supreme Court of Canada =

The table below lists the decisions (known as reasons) delivered from the bench by the Supreme Court of Canada during 2019. The table illustrates what reasons were filed by each justice in each case, and which justices joined each reason.

== Reasons ==
Delivered the Court's reason
Joined the Court's reason
Filed a concurrence
Joined a concurrence
Filed a dissent
Joined a dissent
Filed a concurrence/dissent
Joined a concurrence/dissent
Did not participate in the judgment
Did not participate in the final disposition of the judgment
Not a member of the Court at the time of hearing or delivering
- Decisions that do not note a Justice delivering the Court's reason are per coram.
- Multiple concurrences and dissents within a case are numbered, with joining votes numbered accordingly. Justices occasionally join multiple reasons in a single case; each vote is subdivided accordingly.
- Multiple unnumbered reasons are jointly written or delivered.
- Decisions that are given orally from the bench are denoted by a "V"; per coram decisions delivered orally from the bench only note a "V" on the most senior justice on the panel.
- An asterisk ( * ) in the Court's opinion denotes that it was only a majority in part or a plurality.

Case name	Argued	Decided	Wagner	Abella	Moldaver	Karakatsanis	Gascon	Côté	Brown	Rowe	Martin	Kasirer
Frank v Canada (AG), 2019 SCC 1	March 21, 2018	January 11, 2019
R v Beaudry, 2019 SCC 2	January 14, 2019	January 14, 2019					V
R v Fedyck, 2019 SCC 3	January 15, 2019	January 15, 2019
SA v Metro Vancouver Housing Corp, 2019 SCC 4	April 25, 2018	January 25, 2019
Orphan Well Association v Grant Thornton Ltd, 2019 SCC 5	February 15, 2018	January 31, 2019
R v Calnen, 2019 SCC 6	February 12, 2018	February 1, 2019
R v Bird, 2019 SCC 7	March 16, 2018	February 8, 2019
R v CJ, 2019 SCC 8	February 12, 2019	February 12, 2019	V
R v Blanchard, 2019 SCC 9	February 13, 2019	February 13, 2019							V
R v Jarvis, 2019 SCC 10	April 20, 2018	February 14, 2019
Case name	Argued	Decided	Wagner	Abella	Moldaver	Karakatsanis	Gascon	Côté	Brown	Rowe	Martin	Kasirer
R v Demedeiros, 2019 SCC 11	February 14, 2019	February 14, 2019			V
R v George-Nurse, 2019 SCC 12	February 15, 2019	February 15, 2019			V
Barer v Knight Brothers LLC , 2019 SCC 13	April 24, 2018	February 22, 2019
Salomon v Matte-Thompson, 2019 SCC 14	March 19, 2018	February 28, 2019
R v Morrison, 2019 SCC 15	April 24, 2018	March 15, 2019
R v Snelgrove, 2019 SCC 16	March 22, 2019	March 22, 2019			V
R v Kelsie, 2019 SCC 17	March 27, 2019	March 27, 2019
R v Myers, 2019 SCC 18	October 18, 2018	March 28, 2019
TELUS Communications Inc v Wellman, 2019 SCC 19	November 6, 2018	April 4, 2019
JW v Canada (AG), 2019 SCC 20	October 10, 2018	April 12, 2019		*
Case name	Argued	Decided	Wagner	Abella	Moldaver	Karakatsanis	Gascon	Côté	Brown	Rowe	Martin	Kasirer
R v Thanabalasingham, 2019 SCC 21	April 17, 2019	April 17, 2019	V
R v Mills, 2019 SCC 22	May 25, 2018	April 18, 2019	1		2	1			*		3
R v JM, 2019 SCC 24	April 18, 2019	April 18, 2019		V
R v Larue, 2019 SCC 25	April 23, 2019	April 23, 2019		V
R v Wakefield, 2019 SCC 26	April 25, 2019	April 25, 2019
R v WLS, 2019 SCC 27	April 26, 2019	April 26, 2019									V
Modern Cleaning Concept Inc v Comité paritaire de l'entretien d'édifices publics de la région de Québec, 2019 SCC 28	November 13, 2018	May 3, 2019
Canada (Public Safety and Emergency Preparedness) v Chhina, 2019 SCC 29	November 14, 2018	May 10, 2019
Christine DeJong Medicine Professional Corp v DBDC Spadina Ltd, 2019 SCC 30	May 14, 2019	May 14, 2019							V
Bessette v British Columbia (AG), 2019 SCC 31	November 15, 2019	May 16, 2019
Case name	Argued	Decided	Wagner	Abella	Moldaver	Karakatsanis	Gascon	Côté	Brown	Rowe	Martin	Kasirer
R v Omar, 2019 SCC 32	May 22, 2019	May 22, 2019							V
R v Barton, 2019 SCC 33	October 11, 2018	May 24, 2019
R v Le, 2019 SCC 34	October 12, 2018	May 31, 2019
L'Oratoire Saint-Joseph du Mont-Royal v JJ, 2019 SCC 35	November 7, 2018	June 7, 2019
1068754 Alberta Ltd. v. Québec (Agence du revenu), 2019 SCC 37	January 22, 2019	June 27, 2019
R v Goldfinch, 2019 SCC 38	January 16, 2019	June 28, 2019
R v Penunsi, 2019 SCC 39	February 21, 2019	July 5, 2019
R v Stillman, 2019 SCC 40	March 26, 2019	July 26, 2019
R v R.V., 2019 SCC 41	March 20, 2019	July 31, 2019
Pioneer Corp. v Godfrey, 2019 SCC 42	December 11, 2018	September 20, 2019
Case name	Argued	Decided	Wagner	Abella	Moldaver	Karakatsanis	Gascon	Côté	Brown	Rowe	Martin	Kasirer
Keatley Surveying Ltd. v Teranet Inc., 2019 SCC 43	March 29, 2019	September 26, 2019
Denis v Côté, 2019 SCC 44	May 16, 2019	September 27, 2019
Fleming v Ontario, 2019 SCC 45	March 21, 2019	October 4, 2019
R v M.R.H., 2019 SCC 46	October 9, 2019	October 9, 2019				V
R v Poulin, 2019 SCC 47	March 25, 2019	October 11, 2019
R v Friesen, 2020 SCC 9	October 16, 2019	October 16, 2019
R v Kernaz, 2019 SCC 48	October 18, 2019	October 18, 2019		V
R.S. v P.R., 2019 SCC 49	January 21, 2019	October 25, 2019
Threlfall v Carleton University, 2019 SCC 50	February 22, 2019	October 31, 2019
Toronto-Dominion Bank v. Young, 2020 SCC 15	November 7, 2019	November 7, 2019
Case name	Argued	Decided	Wagner	Abella	Moldaver	Karakatsanis	Gascon	Côté	Brown	Rowe	Martin	Kasirer
R v Rafilovich, 2019 SCC 51	January 25, 2019	November 8, 2019
R v James, 2019 SCC 52	November 8, 2019	November 8, 2019	V
Volkswagen Group Canada Inc. v Association québécoise de lutte contre la pollution atmosphérique, 2019 SCC 53	November 13, 2019	November 13, 2019	V
R v Javanmardi, 2019 SCC 54	May 15, 2019	November 14, 2019
Michel v. Graydon, 2020 SCC 24	November 14, 2019	November 14, 2019	1	2		2					1
R v K.J.M., 2019 SCC 55	February 19, 2019	November 15, 2019		1		2			1		1
R v Shlah, 2019 SCC 56	November 15, 2019	November 15, 2019			V
Montréal (Ville) v. Octane Stratégie inc.,2019 SCC 57	February 20, 2019	November 22, 2019
Desgagnés Transport Inc. v Wärtsilä Canada Inc., 2019 SCC 58	January 24, 2019	November 28, 2019
Kosoian v Société de transport de Montréal, 2019 SCC 59	April 16, 2019	November 29, 2019
Case name	Argued	Decided	Wagner	Abella	Moldaver	Karakatsanis	Gascon	Côté	Brown	Rowe	Martin	Kasirer
R v Resolute FP Canada Inc., 2019 SCC 60	March 28, 2019	December 6, 2019
International Air Transport Association v Instrubel, N.V., 2019 SCC 61	December 11, 2019	December 11, 2019	V
Yared v Karam, 2019 SCC 62	March 19, 2019	December 12, 2019
Canada (Attorney General) v. British Columbia Investment Management Corp., 2019 SCC 63	May 13, 2019	December 13, 2019
R v Collin,2019 SCC 64	December 13, 2019	December 13, 2019				V
Canada (Minister of Citizenship and Immigration) v Vavilov, 2019 SCC 65	December 4, 2018	December 19, 2019
Bell Canada v Canada (Attorney General), 2019 SCC 66	December 4, 2018	December 19, 2019
Canada Post Corp. v Canadian Union of Postal Workers, 2019 SCC 67	December 10, 2018	December 20, 2019
Case name	Argued	Decided	Wagner	Abella	Moldaver	Karakatsanis	Gascon	Côté	Brown	Rowe	Martin	Kasirer
