= 2016 reasons of the Supreme Court of Canada =

The table below lists the decisions (known as reasons) delivered from the bench by the Supreme Court of Canada during 2016. The table illustrates what reasons were filed by each justice in each case, and which justices joined each reason.

== Reasons ==
Delivered the Court's reason
Joined the Court's reason
Filed a concurrence
Joined a concurrence
Filed a dissent
Joined a dissent
Filed a concurrence/dissent
Joined a concurrence/dissent
Did not participate in the judgment
Did not participate in the final disposition of the judgment
Not a member of the Court at the time of hearing or delivering
- Decisions that do not note a Justice delivering the Court's reason are per coram.
- Multiple concurrences and dissents within a case are numbered, with joining votes numbered accordingly. Justices occasionally join multiple reasons in a single case; each vote is subdivided accordingly.
- Multiple unnumbered reasons are jointly written or delivered.
- Decisions that are given orally from the bench are denoted by a "V"; per coram decisions delivered orally from the bench only note a "V" on the most senior justice on the panel.
- An asterisk ( * ) in the Court's opinion denotes that it was only a majority in part or a plurality.

Case name	Argued	Decided	McLachlin	Abella	Cromwell	Moldaver	Karakatsanis	Wagner	Gascon	Côté	Brown	Rowe
Canadian Pacific Railway Co v Canada (AG), 2016 SCC 1	December 9, 2015	January 15, 2016
R v Seruhungo, 2016 SCC 2	January 15, 2016	January 15, 2016				V
R v Spicer, 2016 SCC 3	January 15, 2016	January 15, 2016				V
Carter v Canada (AG), 2016 SCC 4	January 11, 2016	January 15, 2016
R v Meer, 2016 SCC 5	January 21, 2016	January 21, 2016	V
R v Gagnon, 2016 SCC 6	February 23, 2016	February 23, 2016			V
R v Newman, 2016 SCC 7	February 25, 2016	February 25, 2016	V
Commission scolaire de Laval v Syndicat de l'enseignement de la région de Laval, 2016 SCC 8	October 14, 2015	March 18, 2016
R v Knapczyk, 2016 SCC 10	January 20, 2016	March 22, 2016	V
R v Borowiec, 2016 SCC 11	January 20, 2016	March 24, 2016
Case name	Argued	Decided	McLachlin	Abella	Cromwell	Moldaver	Karakatsanis	Wagner	Gascon	Côté	Brown	Rowe
Daniels v Canada (Indian Affairs and Northern Development), 2016 SCC 12	October 8, 2015	April 14, 2016
R v Lloyd, 2016 SCC 13	January 13, 2016	April 15, 2016
R v Safarzadeh-Markhali, 2016 SCC 14	November 4, 2015	April 15, 2016
World Bank Group v Wallace, 2016 SCC 15	November 6, 2015	April 29, 2016
R v Shaoulle, 2016 SCC 16	April 29, 2016	April 29, 2016	V
R v Laliberté, 2016 SCC 17	April 29, 2016	April 29, 2016						V
Krayzel Corp v Equitable Trust Co, 2016 SCC 18	November 12, 2015	May 6, 2016
Heritage Capital Corp v Equitable Trust Co, 2016 SCC 19	January 22, 2016	May 6, 2016
Canada (AG) v Chambre des notaires du Québec, 2016 SCC 20	November 3, 2015	June 3, 2016
Canada (National Revenue) v Thompson, 2016 SCC 21	December 4, 2014	June 3, 2016
Case name	Argued	Decided	McLachlin	Abella	Cromwell	Moldaver	Karakatsanis	Wagner	Gascon	Côté	Brown	Rowe
R v DLW, 2016 SCC 22	November 9, 2015	June 9, 2016
Rogers Communications Inc v Chateauguay (City of), 2016 SCC 23	October 9, 2015	June 16, 2016
R v Saeed, 2016 SCC 24	December 1, 2015	June 23, 2016
British Columbia (Workers' Compensation Appeal Tribunal) v Fraser Health Authority, 2016 SCC 25	January 14, 2016	June 24, 2016
R v Vassell, 2016 SCC 26	May 20, 2016	June 30, 2016
R v Jordan, 2016 SCC 27	October 7, 2015	July 8, 2016
R v Williamson, 2016 SCC 28	October 7, 2015	July 8, 2016
Wilson v Atomic Energy of Canada Ltd, 2016 SCC 29	January 19, 2016	July 14, 2016	1	*	2		1	1	1
Lapointe Rosenstein Marchand Melançon LLP v Cassels Brock & Blackwell LLP, 2016 SCC 30	December 3, 2015	July 15, 2016
R v KRJ, 2016 SCC 31	December 2, 2015	July 21, 2016		1							2
Case name	Argued	Decided	McLachlin	Abella	Cromwell	Moldaver	Karakatsanis	Wagner	Gascon	Côté	Brown	Rowe
R v Cawthorne, 2016 SCC 32	April 25, 2016	July 22, 2016
R v Villaroman, 2016 SCC 33	March 21, 2016	July 29, 2016
Ferme Vi-Ber inc v Financière agricole du Québec, 2016 SCC 34	December 10, 2015	July 29, 2016
Musqueam Indian Band v Musqueam Indian Band Board of Review , 2016 SCC 36	April 26, 2016	September 9, 2016
Ledcor Construction Ltd v Northbridge Indemnity Insurance Co, 2016 SCC 37	March 30, 2016	September 15, 2016
Canada (AG) v Igloo Vikski Inc, 2016 SCC 38	March 29, 2016	September 29, 2016
Conférence des juges de paix magistrats du Québec v Quebec (AG), 2016 SCC 39	January 18, 2016	October 14, 2016
R v Rowson, 2016 SCC 40	October 14, 2016	October 14, 2016		V
R v C K-D, 2016 SCC 41	October 14, 2016	October 14, 2016						V
Endean v British Columbia, 2016 SCC 42	May 19, 2016	October 20, 2016
Case name	Argued	Decided	McLachlin	Abella	Cromwell	Moldaver	Karakatsanis	Wagner	Gascon	Côté	Brown	Rowe
R v Anthony-Cook, 2016 SCC 43	March 31, 2016	October 21, 2016
Morasse v Nadeau-Dubois, 2016 SCC 44	April 22, 2016	October 27, 2016
Urban Communications Inc v BCNET Networking Society , 2016 SCC 45	November 1, 2016	November 1, 2016	V
R v Diamond, 2016 SCC 46	October 12, 2016	November 3, 2016
Edmonton (City of) v Edmonton East (Capilano) Shopping Centres Ltd, 2016 SCC 47	March 23, 2016	November 4, 2016
Benhaim v St-Germain, 2016 SCC 48	April 28, 2016	November 10, 2016
British Columbia Teachers' Federation v British Columbia, 2016 SCC 49	November 10, 2016	November 10, 2016	V
Royal Bank of Canada v Trang, 2016 SCC 50	April 27, 2016	November 17, 2016
Mennillo v Intramodal Inc, 2016 SCC 51	December 8, 2015	November 18, 2016
Lizotte v Aviva Insurance Co of Canada, 2016 SCC 52	March 24, 2016	November 25, 2016
Case name	Argued	Decided	McLachlin	Abella	Cromwell	Moldaver	Karakatsanis	Wagner	Gascon	Côté	Brown	Rowe
Alberta (Information and Privacy Commissioner) v University of Calgary, 2016 SCC 53	April 1, 2016	November 25, 2016		1	2
Windsor (City of) v Canadian Transit Co, 2016 SCC 54	April 21, 2016	December 8, 2016		1		2				2	2
Jean Coutu Group (PJC) Inc v Canada (AG), 2016 SCC 55	May 18, 2016	December 9, 2016
Canada (AG) v Fairmont Hotels Inc, 2016 SCC 56	May 18, 2016	December 9, 2016
Case name	Argued	Decided	McLachlin	Abella	Cromwell	Moldaver	Karakatsanis	Wagner	Gascon	Côté	Brown	Rowe

== 2016 statistics ==
Justice	Reasons written	% Majority
Chief Justice Beverley McLachlin	3 / 2 / 2 / 0 / Total=7
Pusine Justice Rosalie Abella	5 / 1 / 1 / 4 / Total=11
Pusine Justice Thomas Cromwell	5 / 3 / 2 / 1 / Total=11
Pusine Justice Michael Moldaver	6 / 1 / 1 / 1 / Total=9
Pusine Justice Andromache Karakatsanis	8 / 2 / 0 / 0 / Total=10
Pusine Justice Richard Wagner	9 / 2 / 1 / 1 / Total=13
Puisne Justice Clément Gascon	8 / 1 / 2 / 0 / Total=11
Puisne Justice Suzanne Côté	7 / 1 / 2 / 8 / Total=18
Puisne Justice Russell Brown	7 / 0 / 3 / 3 / Total=13
Notes on statistics: A justice is only included in the majority if they have joined or concurred in the Court's judgment in full. Percentages are based only on the cases in which a justice participated, and are rounded to the nearest decimal.
