= 2024 judgments of the Supreme Court of Canada =

Supreme Court of Canada Cour suprême du Canada
- Established: April 8, 1875
- Jurisdiction: General court of appeal for Canada
- Motto: Justitia et Veritas
- Authorized by: Supreme Court Act, RSC 1985, c. S-26
- Appeals from: Federal and provincial courts of appeal
- Judge term length: Retirement at age 75
- Number of positions: Nine
- Language: English and French
- Website: Supreme Court of Canada

The table below lists the judgments delivered by the Supreme Court of Canada during 2024. The judgments are listed in chronological order, starting with the first judgment rendered on January 16, 2024, and continung until the last judgment of the year, rendered on December 20, 2024. The table gives a general illustration of the positions taken by each justice on each case, and how justices concurred or dissented with the decisions of the majority.

The Supreme Court normally reserves its judgment after hearing argument on an appeal, and then gives its judgment at some later date by depositing the judgment and reasons with the Registrar of the Supreme Court. On average, judgments in reserved cases are given within six months of the hearing date. In some cases, the court may give its judgment from the bench at the conclusion of the hearing, with a short outline of its reasons. Those judgments are indicated in the table. The court may also give its judgment from the bench at the conclusion of the hearing, reasons to follow at a later date. Those judgments are included on the date reasons are given, which may be in a subsequent year.

This table includes cases which were argued in a previous year and reserved, with the judgment given in 2024. Cases which were heard in 2024 and reserved, with judgment in a later year, will be included in the article for the later year.

There were no changes in the membership of the court in 2024. However, the previous year Justice Russell Brown took a leave of absence from the court effective February 1, 2023 and retired on June 12, 2023. His absence from February 1, 2023 onwards is shown in cases in this table which were argued during that period but not decided until 2024.

== Judgments ==
By the Court (C)
Unanimous reasons for judgment (U)
Concurred in the unanimous reasons (C–U)
Majority reasons for judgment (M)
Concurred in the majority (C–M)
Concurring reasons (C–R)
Concurred in the concurring reasons (C–C)
Plurality reasons (P)
Concurred in the plurality reasons (C–P)
Dissenting reasons (D)
Concurred in the dissent (C–D)
Dissenting in part (D–P)
Concurred in the partial dissent (C–DP)
Seriatim reasons (S)
Concurred in seriatim reasons (C–S)
Motion (Mo)
Did not sit on the appeal (NS)
Did not participate in the judgment (NP)
Not a Justice of the Court at the time of hearing or judgment (NJ)
- "Decision by the Court" means that it is a unanimous judgment of the Court, not attributed to any particular justice.
- "Unanimous reasons for judgment" indicated a unanimous decision, written by a particular justice.
- Multiple concurrences and dissents within a case are numbered, with concurrences by other numbered accordingly. Justices occasionally concur in multiple reasons in a single case; each concurrence is subdivided accordingly.
- Reasons are sometimes drafted jointly by two or more justices.
- Decisions that are given orally from the bench are denoted by "Bench" on the justice who gave the oral decision.

Case name	Argued	Decided	Wagner	Karakatsanis	Côté	Brown (Note: Justice Brown retired on June 12, 2023.)	Rowe	Martin	Kasirer	Jamal	O'Bonsawin	Moreau (Note: Justice Moreau was appointed on November 6, 2023.)
R. v. Vu, 2024 SCC 1	Jan 16, 2024	Jan 16, 2024	M Bench	C–M	NS	NJ	C–M	C–M	NS	C–M	D	C–M
R. v. Landry, 2024 SCC 2	Jan 17, 2024	Jan 17, 2024	NS	M Bench	D	NJ	NS	NS	C–M	NS	C–M	C–M
R. v. Brunelle, 2024 SCC 3	Feb 8, 2023	Jan 26, 2024	C–M	C–M	NS	NS	C–R	C–M	C–M	C–M	M	NJ
Ontario (Attorney General) v. Ontario (Information and Privacy Commissioner), 2024 SCC 4	Apr 18, 2023	Feb 2, 2024	C–M	M	C–R	NS	C–M	C–M	NS	C–M	C–M	NJ
Reference re An Act respecting First Nations, Inuit and Métis children, youth and families, 2024 SCC 5 (Note: Justice Brown sat on the appeal, but retired on June 12, 2023, and did not participate in the decision.)	Dec 7, 8, 2022	Feb 9, 2024	C	C	C	NP	C	C	C	C	C	NJ
R. v. Bykovets, 2024 SCC 6	Jan 17, 2023; Dec 11, 2023 (Note: Re-hearing on December 11, 2023; original panel was Wagner, Karakatsanis, Côté, Brown, Martin, Jamal and O’Bonsawin. Justice Brown retired on June 12, 2023 and did not sit on the re-hearing.)	Mar 1, 2024	C–D	M	D	NJ	C–D	C–M	C–M	C–M	C–D	C–M
R. v. Kruk, 2024 SCC 7	May 18, 2023	Mar 8, 2024	C–M	NS	C–M	NS	C–R	M	C–M	C–M	C–M	NJ
Yatar v. TD Insurance Meloche Monnex, 2024 SCC 8	Nov 15, 2023	Mar 15, 2024	C–U	C–U	C–U	NJ	U	C–U	C–U	C–U	C–U	C–U
R. v. Boudreau, 2024 SCC 9	Mar 20, 2024	Mar 20, 2024	NS	NS	U Bench	NJ	NS	C–U	C–U	C–U	C–U	NS
Dickson v. Vuntut Gwitchin First Nation, 2024 SCC 10	Feb 7, 2023	Mar 28, 2024	C–M	NS	C–M	NS	D–P; 1	D–P; 2 Joint	M Joint	M Joint	D–P; 2 Joint	NJ
Case name	Argued	Decided	Wagner	Karakatsanis	Côté	Brown	Rowe	Martin	Kasirer	Jamal	O'Bonsawin	Moreau
Eurobank Ergasias S.A. v. Bombardier inc., 2024 SCC 11	Nov 14, 2023	Apr 5, 2024	C–M	C–D	D	NJ	C–M	C–M	M	C–M	C–M	C–M
Shot Both Sides v. Canada, 2024 SCC 12	Oct 12, 2023	Apr 12, 2024	C–U	NS	C–U	NJ	C–U	C–U	C–U	C–U	U	NJ
Société des casinos du Québec inc. v. Association des cadres de la Société des casinos du Québec, 2024 SCC 13	Apr 20, 2023	Apr 19, 2024	C–C; 1	C–M	C–R; 1	NS	C–R; 2	NS	C–M	M	C–M	NJ
Case name	Argued	Decided	Wagner	Karakatsanis	Côté	Rowe	Martin	Kasirer	Jamal	O'Bonsawin	Moreau
R. v. D.F., 2024 SCC 14	Apr 22, 2024	Apr 22, 2024	M Bench	C–M	C–M	D	C–M	C–M	C–M	C–M	C–M
R. v. Edwards, 2024 SCC 15	Oct 16, 2023	Apr 26, 2024	C–M	D	C–M	C–M	NS	M	C–M	C–M	NJ
R. v. Tayo Tompouba, 2024 SCC 16	Oct 11, 2023	May 3, 2024	M	D Joint	C–M	C–M	D Joint	C–M	NS	C–M	NJ
St. John’s (City) v. Lynch, 2024 SCC 17	Nov 16, 2023	May 10, 2024	NS	C–U	C–U	C–U	U	C–U	C–U	C–U	NS
R. v. Lozada, 2024 SCC 18	Feb 13, 2024	May 17, 2024	NS	C–U	NS	C–D	C–U	NS	D	NS	M
R. v. T.W.W., 2024 SCC 19	Nov 10, 2023	May 24, 2024	C–M	C–M	D Joint	C–M	C–M	C–M	C–M	M	D Joint
Earthco Soil Mixtures Inc. v. Pine Valley Enterprises Inc., 2024 SCC 20	Oct 17, 2023	May 31, 2024	C–M	NS	D	C–M	M	C–M	C–M	C–M	NJ
Canadian Broadcasting Corp. v. Named Person, 2024 SCC 21	Dec 12, 13, 2023	Jun 7, 2024	C	C	C	C	C	C	C	C	C
York Region District School Board v. Elementary Teachers’ Federation of Ontario, 2024 SCC 22	Oct 18, 2023	Jun 21, 2024	C–M	C–C; Joint	C–M	M	C–C; Joint	C–M	C–M	NS	NJ
Dow Chemical Canada ULC v. Canada, 2024, 2024 SCC 23	Nov 9, 2023	Jun 28, 2024	NS	C–D	D	C–D	C–M	M	C–M	C–M	NS
Case name	Argued	Decided	Wagner	Karakatsanis	Côté	Rowe	Martin	Kasirer	Jamal	O'Bonsawin	Moreau
Iris Technologies Inc. v. Canada (Attorney General), 2024 SCC 24	Nov 9, 2023	Jun 28, 2024	NS	C–R	C–R	C–C	C–M	M	C–M	C–M	NS
R. v. Hodgson, 2024 SCC 25	Feb 15, 2024	Jul 12, 2024	C–M	C–M	C–M	C–R	M Joint	C–M	C–M	C–M	M Joint
Canada (Attorney General) v. Power, 2024 SCC 26	Dec 7, 2023	Jul 19, 2024	M Joint	M Joint	C–D	D	C–M	C–DP	D–P	C–M	C–M
Ontario (Attorney General) v. Restoule, 2024 SCC 27	Nov 7, 8, 2023	Jul 26, 2024	C–U	C–U	C–U	C–U	C–U	C–U	U	C–U	C–U
Poonian v. British Columbia (Securities Commission), 2024 SCC 28	Dec 6, 2023	Jul 31, 2024	C–M	D–P	M	C–M	C–DP	NS	C–M	C–M	NS
R. v. Charles, 2024 SCC 29	Jan 18, 2024	Sep 25, 2024	NS	C–M	D Joint	C–D	C–M	D Joint	C–M	NS	M
International Air Transport Association v. Canada (Transportation Agency), 2024 SCC 30	Mar 25, 2024	Oct 4, 2024	C–U	C–U	C–U	U	C–U	C–U	C–U	C–U	C–U
Aquino v. Bondfield Construction Co., 2024 SCC 31	Dec 5, 2023	Oct 11, 2024	C–U	C–U	C–U	C–U	C–U	NS	U	C–U	NS
Scott v. Golden Oaks Enterprises Inc., 2024 SCC 32	December 5, 2023	October 11, 2024	C–M	C–M	C–R	C–M	C–M	NS	M	C–M	NS
R. v. Sabiston, 2024 SCC 33	October 11, 2024	October 11, 2024	NS	NS	M Bench	C–M	NS	NS	C–M	C–M	D Bench
Case name	Argued	Decided	Wagner	Karakatsanis	Côté	Rowe	Martin	Kasirer	Jamal	O'Bonsawin	Moreau
R. v. Wolfe, 2024 SCC 34	Mar 26, 2024	Oct 18, 2024	C–M	C–M	C–D	C–M	M	C–D	C–D	C–M	D
R. v. Archambault, 2024 SCC 35	Feb 14, 2024	Nov 1, 2024	C–D	D	P Joint	P Joint	C–R; 1	C–R; 2	C–C; 2	C–D	C–D
Auer v. Auer, 2024 SCC 36	Apr 25, 2024	Nov 8, 2024	C–U	C–U	U	C–U	C–U	C–U	C–U	C–U	C–U
TransAlta Generation Partnership v. Alberta, 2024 SCC 37	Apr 25, 2024	Nov 8, 2024	C–U	C–U	U	C–U	C–U	C–U	C–U	C–U	C–U
R. v. T.J.F., 2024 SCC 38	Mar 27, 2024	Nov 15, 2024	C–M	C–M	D Joint	D Joint	C–M	C–M	C–M	M	C–M
Quebec (Attorney General) v. Pekuakamiulnuatsh Takuhikan, 2024 SCC 39	Apr 23, 24, 2024	Nov 27, 2024	C–M	C–M	D	C–M	C–M	M	C–M	C–M	C–M
Sanis Health Inc. v. British Columbia, 2024 SCC 40	May 23, 24, 2024	Nov 29, 2024	C–M	M	D	NS	C–M	C–M	NS	C–M	C–M
R v. Stevenson, 2024 SCC 41	Nov 8, 2024	Nov 8, 2024; Dec 5, 2024 (Note: Hearing and judgment November 8, 2024; reasons for judgment, December 5, 2024.)	NS	NS	NS	D	M Joint	M Joint	M Joint	M Joint	NS
R v. Campbell, 2024 SCC 42 (Note: Although Justice Rowe did not formally concur in Justice Jamal's decision, in his concurring reasons Rowe stated that he fully agreed with Jamal's reasons and results, creating a majority decision.)	Mar 21, 2024	Dec 6, 2024	C–M	C–D	C–R; 1	C–R; 2	D Joint	C–M	M	C–M	D Joint
Quebec v. Directrice de la protection de la jeunesse du CISSS A, 2024 SCC 43	Mar 19, 2024	Dec 20, 2024	U	C–U	C–U	C–U	C–U	C–U	C–U	C–U	C–U
Case name	Argued	Decided	Wagner	Karakatsanis	Côté	Rowe	Martin	Kasirer	Jamal	O'Bonsawin	Moreau
