= Fleming v Ontario =

Canadian legal decision

- Supreme Court of Canada

Hearing: March 21, 2019 Judgment: October 4, 2019
- Full case name: Randolph (Randy) Fleming v. Her Majesty The Queen in Right of the Province of Ontario, et al.
- Citations: 2019 SCC 45
- Docket No.: 38087
- Prior history: Judgment for Ontario in the Court of Appeal for Ontario

Court membership
- Chief Justice: Richard Wagner; Puisne Justices: Rosalie Abella, Michael Moldaver, Andromache Karakatsanis, Clément Gascon, Suzanne Côté, Russell Brown, Malcolm Rowe, Sheilah Martin

Reasons given
- Unanimous reasons by: Côté J

Fleming v Ontario, 2019 SCC 45 is a decision of the Supreme Court of Canada on the powers of police officers under the common law ancillary power doctrine. The Court unanimously held that police officers did not have the authority to arrest someone engaging in lawful conduct to prevent a breach of peace by others.

== Background ==
=== Ancillary power doctrine ===
The ancillary power doctrine is a common law rule that assumes that when an obligation is imposed on the executive, it also implicitly gains the 'ancillary' powers necessary to execute it. In the context of police powers, the doctrine is applied through the Waterfield test, which originated in the United Kingdom but has versions that have since been adopted by the courts of many other common law jurisdictions, including Canada.

Under the test, police officers may take an action to interfere with a person's liberty or privacy if:

1. they were acting in the execution of their duties under common law or statute, and
2. the conduct constituted a justifiable interference with the individual's liberty or privacy

=== Factual background ===
A group of First Nations protesters that had long disputed the Canada's claim to an area of land in Caledonia, Ontario, known as Douglas Creek Estates (D.C.E), occupied the land in a 2006 protest and also hung indigenous flags across an adjacent street. The land was purchased by the government in June that year, which subsequently permitted the occupation. That in turn caused many residents, who were angry with the protests and the government response to them, to organize their own counter-protests.

In the past, many of the protests had become contentious and led to violent clashes between the two groups. When the Ontario Provincial Police (OPP) became aware of another "flag rally" counter-protest in which protesters hoped to carry the Canadian flag near a site on the street adjacent to the D.C.E, they developed an operational plan to manage it. They barred the counter-protesters from entering the D.C.E and planned to keep both groups of protesters separate from each other.

On the day of the flag rally, Randy Fleming, flying the Canadian flag, was walking north along said street, hoping to join the rally. When he saw a police car coming along the street, he jumped on the property to avoid it. His stepping on the D.C.E. caused a reaction among a group of 10-12 occupying protesters stationed about 100 metres away, who began walking towards him. An OPP officer immediately placed Fleming under arrest, he resisted but was escorted to the police cruiser, and then transported to a jail cell. About two-and a-half hours later, he was released and charged with obstructing a peace officer. The Crown eventually withdrew the charge around 19 months after it had been laid. Fleming sued the Province of Ontario and seven police officers for assault and battery, wrongful arrest, and false imprisonment.

== Lower courts ==
The trial judge found that the province had infringed Fleming's rights, and she found it guilty of battery, wrongful arrest, and false imprisonment. Shr ordered the province to pay over $139,000 in general damages to Fleming, over $150,000 in legal cost, and an additional $5,000 in punitive damages over their breach of his Charter rights. In her ruling, the trial judge stated that the OPP should not have arrested Fleming, who had done nothing unlawful, over a fear that there would a breach of peace. In her ruling. she accepted that such arrests might sometimes be lawful, but that in this case, the risk of a breach of peace was not substantial or imminent and that the police had other reasonable alternatives such as setting up a buffer zone.

On appeal, the Ontario Court of Appeal overturned her decision and held that the police had the power to perform arrests to prevent an anticipated breach of peace under the ancillary power doctrine. According to the Court of Appeal, the judge had erred in holding there was no imminent risk of a breach of peace because she considered the conflict from a narrow perspective, rather than seeing it in the broader context of the past clashes in Caledonia. The Court of Appeal cleared the province of all wrongdoing, with the exception of battery, for which it ordered a new trial to determine if excessive force had been used.

== Supreme Court judgment ==
Justice Suzanne Côté, writing for a unanimous Supreme Court of Canada, overturned the Court of Appeals decision and held that the province was guilty of wrongful arrest, false imprisonment, and battery.

The Court, in applying the ancillary power doctrine test for police powers, considered:

1. whether the police conduct at issue fell within the general scope of a statutory or common law police duty, and
2. whether the conduct involved a justifiable exercise of police powers associated with that duty.

The Court held that while preventing a breach of peace, even by the arrest of someone not engaging in unlawful activities, undoubtedly fell within the general scope of police duty, the conduct could not pass muster in the second step.

The Court then noted that courts must assess whether the police conduct was reasonably necessary to fulfil the police duty in question and in analyzing whether it was, it should assess three factors, previously identified in R v MacDonald: the importance of the performance of the duty to the public good, the necessity of the interference with individual liberty for the performance of the duty, and the extent of the interference with individual liberty.

The power to arrest law-abiding individuals to prevent a breach of peace, Côté wrote, failed because the second branch of the test must be applied with rigour to protect the rights and liberty of individuals against unnecessary encroachment by the state. She wrote that the standard of justification must be commensurate with the fundamental rights at stake, and that the bar was particularly high for a power like the one before the Court, for a number of reasons. Firstly, it intruded on the liberty of someone who had not and was not suspected of engaging in any unlawful activity. Secondly, the proposed power was inherently preventive in nature, and those types of powers must be recognized by courts with great caution because of their potential to sanction profound infringements on liberty for little societal benefit. Finally, since the purported power would not typically result in criminal charges, judicial oversight would be limited.

Côté noted that there were few state actions that interfered with liberty as significantly as arrest and that allowing police officers to arrest someone acting lawfully over the apprehended actions of another would severely undermine the public's expectation of being able to live their lives free of coercive state conduct. She also stated that the mere high effectiveness of arrest could not compensate for its blunt nature and that there were less intrusive alternatives available to the police to exercise their duty. She citedc that in this case, a buffer zone could have been set up to avoid confrontations like the one that occurred.

== See also ==
- 2019 reasons of the Supreme Court of Canada
- R v Waterfield
- Kosoian v Société de transport de Montréal
