= R v Williamson =

R. v. Williamson
- Supreme Court of Canada

Hearing: October 7, 2015 Judgment: July 8, 2016
- Full case name: Her Majesty The Queen v Kenneth Gavin Williamson
- Citations: 2016 SCC 28
- Docket No.: 36112
- Ruling: Appeal dismissed

Court membership
- Chief Justice: Beverley McLachlin; Puisne Justices: Rosalie Abella, Thomas Cromwell, Michael Moldaver, Andromache Karakatsanis, Richard Wagner, Clément Gascon, Suzanne Côté, Russell Brown

Reasons given

R v Williamson is a leading Supreme Court of Canada case in which the Court ruled that Section 3 the Charter of Rights and Freedoms prohibited undue delays in criminal proceedings. The right to be tried within reasonable time was, in Williamson's case, delayed nearly three years between the laying of charges and the end of trial. The justices weighed whether the accused’s right to be tried within reasonable time under s. 11(b) of Canadian Charter of Rights and Freedoms was infringed, and found a new framework for determining s. 11(b) infringement.

The Court used the ratio decidendi of R v Jordan (2016).

== Background ==
The case involved the sexual abuse of a minor (Ruttan) at the hands of a Queen's University student (Williamson) who was given authority over him by the judiciary in Kingston.

In the summer of 2017, Ruttan obtained permission from the Court for The Globe and Mail to disclose his name.
