= Canada (Attorney General) v. Power =

Supreme Court of Canada constitutional case

- Supreme Court of Canada

Hearing: December 7, 2023 Judgment: July 19, 2024
- Full case name: Attorney General of Canada (Appellant) v. Joseph Power (Respondent) and Attorney General of Ontario, Attorney General of Quebec, Attorney General of Nova Scotia, Attorney General of New Brunswick, Attorney General of Manitoba, Attorney General of British Columbia, Attorney General of Prince Edward Island, Attorney General of Saskatchewan, Attorney General of Alberta, Attorney General of Newfoundland and Labrador, Fisher River Cree Nation, Sioux Valley Dakota Nation, Manto Sipi Cree Nation, Lake Manitoba First Nation, Quebec Native Women Inc., Speaker of the Senate, David Asper Centre for Constitutional Rights, Canadian Civil Liberties Association, Canadian Constitution Foundation, Queen’s Prison Law Clinic, John Howard Society of Canada, British Columbia Civil Liberties Association, West Coast Prison Justice Society and Speaker of the House of Commons (Interveners)
- Citations: 2024 SCC 26
- Docket No.: 40241

Holding
- The Crown, in its executive capacity, can be held liable in damages for Parliament enacting a bill into law, which is later deemed to be unconstitutional by a court, as well as for government officials and ministers acting in a legislative capacity in preparing and drafting the bill.

Court membership
- Chief Justice: Richard Wagner
- Puisne Justices: Andromache Karakatsanis; Suzanne Côté; Malcolm Rowe; Sheilah Martin; Nicholas Kasirer; Mahmud Jamal; Michelle O'Bonsawin; Mary Moreau

Reasons given
- Majority: Wagner and Karakatsanis (Martin, O'Bonsawin, and Moreau, concurring)
- Concur/dissent: Jamal (Kasirer concurring)
- Dissent: Rowe (Côté concurring)

Canada (Attorney General) v. Power is a 2024 decision of the Supreme Court of Canada on the Crown's immunity for an action arising out of a legislature's enactment of legislation that violates the Canadian Charter of Rights and Freedoms.

== Background ==
Joseph Power was convicted in 1996 of two offences of sexual assault and sentenced to prison. After being dismissed in 2011 from his job at a New Brunswick hospital when his criminal record came to light, he applied in 2013 for a pardon (now known as a record suspension). His application was refused under the Limiting Pardons for Serious Crimes Act, which Parliament passed in 2010, and the Safe Streets and Communities Act, which Parliament passed in 2012, because of the nature of his crimes.

The act's transitional provisions were later struck down by the courts for violating sections 11(h) and (i) of the Canadian Charter of Rights and Freedoms, which prohibit a second punishment for the same crime after a punishment for that crime is complete, and prohibit a harsher punishment than was authorized at the time of the offence. Power sued for damages under section 24(1) of the Charter.

== Decision ==
In a 5-2-2 decision, the Supreme Court of Canada held that the executive government could be held liable for Charter damages for preparing legislation that is later struck down by the courts, as well as for Parliament enacting legislation which is later struck down by the courts.

Jamal and Kasirer would have held that the Crown enjoys absolute immunity for ministers and officials preparing and drafting a bill which is later found to be unconstitutional, but that damages are available for the legislature enacting such legislation.

Rowe and Côté would have held that damages are available in neither situation.

== Commentary ==
The attorneys for the plaintiff, Joseph Power, declared, "This decision is a landmark ruling in constitutional law and involved more than 20 interveners on appeal."

The Canadian Constitution Foundation declared that it was "pleased" by the decision. The Foundation had intervened in the case in opposition to a finding of absolute parliamentary immunity. The David Asper Center for Constitutional Rights at the University of Toronto, which also intervened in opposition to absolute parliamentary immunity, declared, "Significantly, the Supreme Court’s view achieves a balance between important legislative privileges which weigh in favour of absolute immunity, and the Charter rights of all Canadians that favour no immunity."

Thecourt.ca, the law review of Osgoode Hall Law School, called the decision "a sort of goldilocks solution – some immunity but not too much." Thecourt.ca still decries both the majority decision and the two dissenting reasons for their lack of clarity, though the article still asserts that all three sets of reasons struck a different balance in how to reconcile the opposing constitutional principles of parliamentary sovereignty and the rule of law.

University of Ottawa law professor Stéphane Sérafin called the judgment "shocking", writing that the Supreme Court "effectively granted itself ultimate authority over the legislative process in this country". Philippe Lagassé, an expert on the Crown and the Westminster system at Carleton University, wrote that the majority judgment in Power was "all rather disconcerting" and "went against rulings as recent as 2018 in Mikisew, went against the principle that one part of the Constitution shouldn’t invalidate another, and dissolved the essential distinction made between the Crown’s capacities and those of legislative and executive offices".

Legal scholar Kerry Sun described the Court's judgment as exhibiting "a striking misapprehension of Canada’s constitutional architecture" and commented that the decision was "perhaps one of the Supreme Court’s most expensive mistakes in recent history".

Legal commentator and lawyer Asher Honickman wrote the decision "subverts" the core constitutional principles of parliamentary privilege and parliamentary sovereignty.

In a public lecture delivered on 3 September 2026, former justice of the Supreme Court of Canada Russell Brown excoriated Power as "a wrong decision, a decision that is based on an objectively and verifiably wrong understanding of an aspect of [the Court's] constitutional status; a decision that is, as such, manifestly per incuriam, is rare and probably the first such decision since the Provincial Court Judges Reference."
