= Kosoian v Société de transport de Montréal =

Supreme Court of Canada decision

- Supreme Court of Canada

Hearing: April 16, 2019 Judgment: November 29, 2019
- Full case name: Bela Kosoian v. Société de transport de Montréal, et al.
- Citations: 2019 SCC 59
- Docket No.: 38012
- Prior history: Judgment for defendants in the Court of Appeal for Quebec

Court membership
- Chief Justice: Richard Wagner; Puisne Justices: Rosalie Abella, Michael Moldaver, Andromache Karakatsanis, Clément Gascon, Suzanne Côté, Russell Brown, Malcolm Rowe, Sheilah Martin

Reasons given
- Unanimous reasons by: Côté J

Kosoian v Société de transport de Montréal, 2019 SCC 59 is a decision of the Supreme Court of Canada on the public law immunity of police officers and public bodies. The Court unanimously held that police officers who enforced non-existent laws did not enjoy civil or criminal immunity for their actions.

The case arose when a woman refused to comply with a pictogram directing her to hold the handrail of an escalator. She was ordered to comply by an officer who believed, and had been taught, wrongly, that the pictogram represented a by-law. After she refused multiple demands, the officer arrested her.

== Background ==
On May 13, 2009, Bela Kosoian, a 38-year-old student of the Université du Québec à Montréal entered Montmorency Metro station in Laval on her way to attend class. As she began descending the escalator, she began rummaging through her bag for money to the buy a ticket.

An officer who was assigned to monitor subway stations in Laval, SPVM Constable Fabio Camacho, saw her and asked her to hold the handrail, as Camacho mistakenly believed that a pictogram asking Metro users to hold the escalator handrail represented a municipal bylaw. Kosoian refused, and a heated argument ensued. Constable Camacho told her that she would be ticketed if she did not hold the handrail. Kosoian protested and continued to refuse the demand. Camacho confronted her when she reached the bottom of the escalator, and told her to accompany him to a holding room so a statement of offence could be drawn up, but Kosoian refused the request and began to walk towards the subway turnstiles.

Camacho and his partner used physical force in response. Camacho held her forearm to restrain her, and he and his partner then proceeded to move her to the holding room, dragging her by the elbows. Once at the holding room, Camacho asked her to identify herself, but she refused to comply with Camacho's demand and asked to contact a lawyer. Camacho then warned her that should she continue, she would be arrested for hindering the duties of a police officer, but Kosoian again refused to comply. She was subsequently placed under arrest and informed of her Charter rights.

Camacho then began searching her bag for a piece of identification. Kosoian objected, and he stepped on her foot in an attempt in seize the backpack. After she continued resisting the arrest, Camacho and his partner pinned Kosoian against the wall, handcuffed her, and seized her bag. Camacho then made her sit in a chair as he and his partner searched her bag and promptly found her wallet and identification cards. She was then given tickets for not holding the handrail, (with a fine of $100) and for hindering an inspector in the performance of his duties(with a fine of $320).

According to Kosoian, she suffered serious psychological harm from the incident. The following day she met with a physician, who told her she was suffering from post-arrest anxiety and abrasions on her wrists and foot. A couple of days later, another physician diagnosed her with post-traumatic stress disorder and a strained ankle.

== In lower courts ==
The Société de transport de Montréal initiated a prosecution in municipal court to collect the tickets. On March 14, 2012, Judge Florent Bisson acquitted her of both offences, stating he was not satisfied beyond a reasonable doubt that there was an obligation to obey the pictogram. In his ruling, he also described Kosoian's testimony as credible, and rejected the prosecution's description of key events.

Kosoian subsequently commenced civil proceedings against the officer, the city, and the Société, stating that they breached their duties under Quebec's civil code. She said that Camacho committed a fault by using physical restraint unreasonable in the circumstances, that the city was vicariously liable for the actions of Camacho, and that the Société was liable for misapplying the law. In her lawsuit, she stated that the incident had caused her psychological suffering, minor injuries, and violated her dignity. She sought $69,000 in compensation and punitive damages.

At the provincial Court of Quebec, the trial judge Denis Reste dismissed the action. According to him, Constable Camacho had not committed any fault. He ruled that the directives were clear, and the police officers' actions against her were entirely justified. He said it was Ms. Kosoian who had behaved in an inconceivable and stubborn manner by refusing to follow the officers' simple directions. On appeal, the Quebec Court of Appeal upheld the trial judge's finding. According to Justice Julie Dutil, Camacho did not commit a civil fault because he behaved like how any reasonable police officer would given his training, so even though he may have enforced a non-existent law, he was still protected from liability. She also exonerated the Société, saying it was protected by public law immunity, which shielded it from any civil liability resulting from the exercise of its regulatory powers unless bad faith could be proven. Finally, the Court also castigated Kosoian over the situation, holding she was "the author of her own misfortune", saying that she should've simply complied, and then challenged the tickets in Court later.

== Judgment ==
Justice Suzanne Côté, writing for a unanimous court, overturned the Court of Appeal's ruling, and held the city, the officer, and the Société liable for civil fault against Ms. Kosoian. She wrote that because of their duty of maintaining peace, order, and public safety, police officers are empowered to use coercive powers of the state, but with that power comes the responsibility of fully understanding what statues they are responsible for enforcing. Because the importance of preventing abuses of power militates that there always be a legal basis for an officer's actions, any conduct in absence of such a basis is illegal and cannot be tolerated in a society founded on the rule of law. As such, she reasoned, officers who act without legal basis enjoy no public law immunity.

The Court emphasized that though the officer's erroneous training may reduce his fault when assessing damages, it could not absolve him of his responsibility to have an adequate knowledge of the law. Even an officer who was just following orders can be held to be engaging in unreasonable conduct if they depart from what a normally prudent, diligent and competent police officer in the same circumstances would do.

Turning to the liability of the Société, Côté J held that they could not rely on public law immunity. She wrote that such immunity must be restricted to actually making and passing regulations, and could not shield an error in law in enforcement. Absent this immunity, Côté J said, the Société was liable for breach of extracontractual duties under the Civil Code of Quebec, just as any other legal person would be.

Finally, Justice Côté strongly pushed back against the lower courts' assertions that Kosoian was "the master of her own misfortune" because of her stubborn behaviour. She emphasized that Ms. Kosoian could not be held responsible, either wholly or in part, over her decision to resist an unlawful order. No one in a free and democratic society has a duty to accept unjustified state intrusions, and it was not open to the courts to judge her for her resistance. Ultimately the Court awarded Kosoian $20,000 in compensation.

I insist on one point: an unlawful arrest — even for a short time — cannot be considered one of the "ordinary annoyances, anxieties and fears that people living in society routinely . . . accept" ... In a free and democratic society, no one should accept — or expect to be subjected to — unjustified state intrusions. Interference with freedom of movement, just like invasion of privacy, must not be trivialized. — Justice Suzanne Côté, Kosoian v. Société de transport de Montréal, para 139

== Commentary ==
The decision was hailed by civil liberties advocates and legal experts. Fo Niemi of the Centre for Research Action on Race Relations called the decision, "a great victory for the constitutional rights of citizens". Journalist Rob Breakenridge wrote an op-ed for Global News praising the decision as "an important victory for the rights of all Canadians". Cara Zwibel, on behalf of the Canadian Civil Liberties Association (CCLA), also praised the decision. The CCLA said it was particularly pleased by the court's explicit statement no one has the duty to identify themselves to an officer acting unlawfully.

== See also ==
- Fleming v Ontario, another unanimous Supreme Court judgement written by Justice Côté in 2019, restricting police powers
