= Keatley Surveying v Teranet =

- Supreme Court of Canada

Hearing: March 29, 2019 Judgment: September 26, 2019
- Citations: 2019 SCC 43
- Prior history: Judgment for Teranet in the Ontario Court of Appeal.

Court membership
- Chief Justice: Richard Wagner; Puisne Justices: Rosalie Abella, Michael Moldaver, Andromache Karakatsanis, Clément Gascon, Suzanne Côté, Russell Brown, Malcolm Rowe, Sheilah Martin

Reasons given
- Majority: Abella J., joined by Moldaver, Karakatsanis and Martin JJ.
- Concurrence: Côté and Brown JJ., joined by Wagner C.J.

Keatley Surveying v Teranet is a judgment of the Supreme Court of Canada on issues of copyright, specifically Crown copyright, and intellectual property. It was released in September 2019.

== Synopsis ==
The appellant brought a motion in 2007 to certify a class action on behalf of all land surveyors in Ontario who registered or deposited plans of survey in the provincial land registry offices. It claimed that the respondent, who as agent of the Crown, trespassed on the copyright of the land surveyors who had generated the work. The appellant failed to convince the trial judge, failed to sway the Court of Appeal, and failed to persuade the SCC of the rightness of its cause. The judges were very concerned about the public interest, and the clear public character of the works.

It is also important to note that this conclusion furthers the underlying purposes of Crown copyright. A key fact in this case is that registered and deposited plans of survey in the land registry system are intended to be relied upon by members of the public to determine property rights and obligations. It is for this very reason that the Crown decided to create a single, authoritative registry. These are precisely the types of works over which Crown copyright should subsist — those over which it is necessary for the Crown to guarantee authenticity, accuracy and integrity in the public interest.

The concurrence judgment, which begins at ¶92, hinged on the interpretation of section 12 of the Copyright Act.

As to the plans of survey at issue in this case, it is clear that they are government works to which s. 12, properly interpreted, applies. They have a clear public character, as they define and illustrate the legal boundaries of land within the Province. This information is of the highest public importance, clarifying land ownership, and allowing landowners and users to govern their affairs accordingly. Therefore, the works serve a public purpose within the Province. Crown copyright in this information is of similar importance. People rely on the accuracy of survey plans for determining their interest in property and facilitating land transactions. The Crown has a strong interest in the integrity of the land registry system and in public access to accurate versions of surveys.
