= Ontario (Attorney General) v Ontario (Information and Privacy Commissioner) =

2024 Supreme Court of Canada decision

- Supreme Court of Canada

Hearing: April 18, 2023 Judgment: February 2, 2024
- Citations: 2024 SCC 4
- Docket No.: 40078
- Prior history: Attorney General for Ontario v Information and Privacy Commissioner, 2020 ONSC 5085; Ontario (Attorney General) v Ontario (Information and Privacy Commissioner), 2022 ONCA 74.

Court membership
- Chief Justice: Richard Wagner; Puisne Justices: Andromache Karakatsanis, Suzanne Côté, Russell Brown, Malcolm Rowe, Sheilah Martin, Nicholas Kasirer, Mahmud Jamal, Michelle O'Bonsawin

Reasons given
- Majority: Karakatsanis (Wagner, Rowe, Martin, Jamal and O’Bonsawin, concurring)
- Concurrence: Côté J.
- Brown and Kasirer took no part in the consideration or decision of the case.

Laws applied
- Freedom of Information and Protection of Privacy Act

Ontario (Attorney General) v Ontario (Information and Privacy Commissioner), 2024 SCC 4, is a Supreme Court of Canada decision that held the mandate letters issued by Doug Ford to his ministers were protected from disclosure under access to information legislation, under the principle of Cabinet confidentiality.

In July 2018, the Canadian Broadcasting Corporation submitted a request under Ontario's Freedom of Information and Protection of Privacy Act (FIPPA) for 23 mandate letters written by Ontario Premier Doug Ford. The Cabinet Office denied the request, but on appeal, the Information and Privacy Commissioner (IPC) ruled that the letters must be disclosed.

The Supreme Court unanimously overturned a series of lower court decisions that had found Premier Doug Ford's mandate letters were not covered by the exemption for Cabinet records under FIPPA. The Court held that although mandate letters are not explicitly listed in section 12(1) of FIPPA, they nonetheless reveal the substance of Cabinet deliberations and are therefore exempt from disclosure.

== Background ==
=== Freedom of Information and Protection of Privacy Act ===
The Freedom of Information and Protection of Privacy Act (FIPPA) came into effect in 1988, granting individuals the right to access information held by the Government of Ontario and other public bodies.

Under section 12(1) of FIPPA, government officials are required to refuse disclosure of any records that would reveal the substance of deliberations of Cabinet or its committees.

12(1) A head shall refuse to disclose a record where the disclosure would reveal the substance of deliberations of the Executive Council or its committees, including,

(a) an agenda, minute or other record of the deliberations or decisions of the Executive Council or its committees;

(b) a record containing policy options or recommendations submitted, or prepared for submission, to the Executive Council or its committees;

(c) a record that does not contain policy options or recommendations referred to in clause (b) and that does contain background explanations or analyses of problems submitted, or prepared for submission, to the Executive Council or its committees for their consideration in making decisions, before those decisions are made and implemented;

(d) a record used for or reflecting consultation among ministers of the Crown on matters relating to the making of government decisions or the formulation of government policy;

(e) a record prepared to brief a minister of the Crown in relation to matters that are before or are proposed to be brought before the Executive Council or its committees, or are the subject of consultations among ministers relating to government decisions or the formulation of government policy; and

(f) draft legislation or regulations.

The phrase "substance of deliberations" in section 12(1) of the FIPPA also appears in a similar context in the access to information legislation of Alberta, British Columbia, Manitoba, New Brunswick, Newfoundland and Labrador, Nova Scotia, and Prince Edward Island.

=== Prior jurisprudence on cabinet privilege and access to information ===
The Supreme Court of Canada previously addressed Cabinet privilege in the context of evidence in legal proceedings in Carey v Ontario (1986). (Note: Carey v Ontario, 1986 CanLII 7, [1986] 2 SCR 637) In Carey, the Court held that the courts may review a Crown objection to the production of evidence based on public interest immunity and determine whether the claim is justified by considering "the nature of the public interest sought to be protected" and "weighed against the need of producing it in the particular case". (Note: Carey v Ontario, 1986 CanLII 7 at paras 38–39, [1986] 2 SCR 637) The Court emphasized that there is no blanket protection for a class of documents, including Cabinet documents. (Note: Carey v Ontario, 1986 CanLII 7 at paras 79–80, [1986] 2 SCR 637)

Prior to Ontario (Attorney General) v Ontario (Information and Privacy Commissioner), the leading Canadian appellate decision on Cabinet confidentiality in the access to information context was O'Connor v Nova Scotia. In O'Connor, the Nova Scotia Court of Appeal interpreted the phrase "substance of deliberations" under Nova Scotia's access to information legislation in a manner that narrowed the scope of Cabinet privilege. (Note: O'Connor v Nova Scotia, 2001 NSCA 132 at paras 90–93)

=== CBC FIPPA application ===
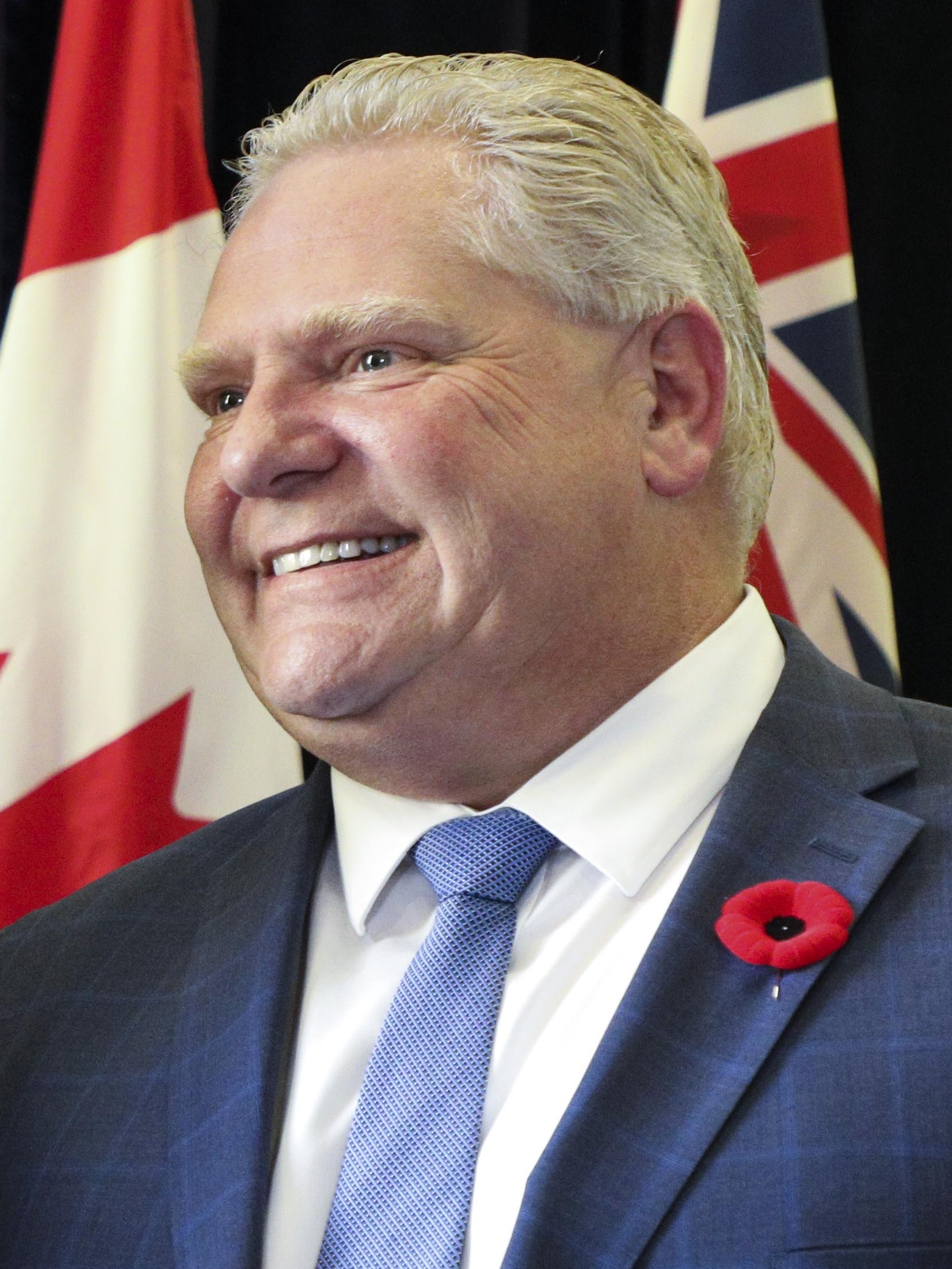
Doug Ford became Premier of Ontario following the 2018 Ontario general election.

In July 2018, Canadian Broadcasting Corporation (CBC) journalist Nicole Brockbank requested access to 23 mandate letters written by Ontario Premier Doug Ford to his cabinet ministers, under FIPPA. The Cabinet Office denied the request, invoking section 12 of the FIPPA on the basis of Cabinet confidentiality. (Note: Ontario (Attorney General) v Ontario (Information and Privacy Commissioner), 2024 SCC 4 at para 5)

The CBC appealed the Cabinet Office's decision to the Information and Privacy Commissioner, who ruled the disclosure of the letters would not reveal any substance of Cabinet deliberations and ordered their release. (Note: Ontario (Attorney General) v Ontario (Information and Privacy Commissioner), 2020 ONSC 5085 at paras 7–8) (Note: Cabinet Office (Re), 2019 CanLII 76037 (ON IPC).)

In September 2023, the mandate letters in question were leaked to Global News.

=== Ontario Superior Court of Justice ===
At the Divisional Court of the Ontario Superior Court of Justice, Justice Michael A. Penny, writing on behalf of Justices Katherine E. Swinton and Freya Kristjanson, dismissed the government's application for judicial review. (Note: Ontario (Attorney General) v Ontario (Information and Privacy Commissioner), 2020 ONSC 5085 at paras 3, 56) Justice Penny held that the IPC's decision was reasonable.

The CBC supported the IPC's decision, arguing that the mandate letters neither constituted nor disclosed Cabinet discussions and therefore were not protected by Cabinet secrecy. (Note: Ontario (Attorney General) v Ontario (Information and Privacy Commissioner), 2020 ONSC 5085 at paras 50–51) The Government of Ontario argued that the letters revealed the Premier's deliberations, which formed part of the broader Cabinet deliberative process. Additionally, the letters were distributed at a Cabinet meeting and could be used to make predictions on future Cabinet discussions. (Note: Ontario (Attorney General) v Ontario (Information and Privacy Commissioner), 2020 ONSC 5085 at paras 20–23)

Justice Penny applied the reasonableness standard of review, as the case did not raise constitutional or rule of law issues, (Note: Ontario (Attorney General) v Ontario (Information and Privacy Commissioner), 2020 ONSC 5085 at paras 13–17) and ultimately upheld the IPC's conclusion that the mandate letters did not reveal the substance of Cabinet deliberations. (Note: Ontario (Attorney General) v Ontario (Information and Privacy Commissioner), 2020 ONSC 5085 at paras 18–30)

=== Court of Appeal for Ontario ===
The Government of Ontario appealed the Divisional Court's decision to the Court of Appeal for Ontario. Writing for the 2–1 majority, Justice Lorne Sossin, with Justice Eileen E. Gillese concurring, held that the Divisional Court correctly applied Vavilov in finding the IPC's decision to be reasonable. (Note: Ontario (Attorney General) v Ontario (Information and Privacy Commissioner), 2022 ONCA 74 at para 87) Justice Peter Lauwers dissented, concluding that the IPC's interpretation of section 12(1) of FIPPA was unreasonable.

== Supreme Court decision ==
A unanimous panel of seven justices held that Premier Doug Ford's mandate letters were exempt from disclosure under section 12(1) of FIPPA, as they revealed the substance of Cabinet deliberations. Justice Côté concurred in the result but dissented on the applicable standard of judicial review.

=== Karakatsanis majority reasons ===
The majority reasons, written by Justice Andromache Karakatsanis and joined by five of the seven justices, set aside the IPC's order and held that the mandate letters were exempt from disclosure under section 12(1) of FIPPA. (Note: Ontario (Attorney General) v Ontario (Information and Privacy Commissioner), 2024 SCC 4 at paras 58–61) The Court instructed administrative decision makers to conduct a substantive analysis of the requested record in freedom of information requests to determine whether the record could allow a sophisticated person to infer cabinet deliberations. While the mandate letters did not explicitly provide the content of cabinet deliberations, they reflected the Premier's priorities and views and marked the starting point of the fluid Cabinet policy development process. (Note: Ontario (Attorney General) v Ontario (Information and Privacy Commissioner), 2024 SCC 4 at paras 47–57)

In reviewing the IPC's decision, the Court held that the Commissioner focused too narrowly on two rationales for Cabinet secrecy, promoting ministerial candour and preserving Cabinet solidarity. (Note: Ontario (Attorney General) v Ontario (Information and Privacy Commissioner), 2024 SCC 4 at paras 32–34) The Court found that the IPC failed to consider a third rationale: the promotion of efficient government, which includes the government's prerogative to determine how and when policy priorities are communicated to the public. The IPC did not adequately assess the potential impact of premature disclosure on the efficiency of government. (Note: Ontario (Attorney General) v Ontario (Information and Privacy Commissioner), 2024 SCC 4 at paras 35–39) The Supreme Court clarified that Cabinet confidentiality is grounded in three core rationales: "candour, solidarity, and efficiency, all in the aid of effective government". (Note: Ontario (Attorney General) v Ontario (Information and Privacy Commissioner), 2024 SCC 4 at para 3)

The Court also found the IPC erred in its failure to consider the constitutional conventions underlying the fluid nature of Cabinet decision-making and the unique role of the Premier in that process. (Note: Ontario (Attorney General) v Ontario (Information and Privacy Commissioner), 2024 SCC 4 at paras 53–55)

Mel Cappe and Yan Campagnolo note that that both Justice Karakatsanis, who authored the majority reasons, and Justice Malcolm Rowe previously served as Cabinet secretaries and had firsthand knowledge of the operations and functions of Cabinet. In its decision, the Court took judicial notice of studies on cabinet privilege that were neither part of the evidentiary record nor cited by the parties.

=== Justice Côté's concurrence ===
Justice Suzanne Côté wrote concurring reasons, agreeing with Justice Karakatsanis's interpretation of section 12(1) of FIPPA and the conclusion that the mandate letters were exempt from disclosure. However, she dissented on the issue of the applicable standard of review. (Note: Ontario (Attorney General) v Ontario (Information and Privacy Commissioner), 2024 SCC 4 at para 65) Justice Côté argued that it was necessary to determine whether the standard of review was correctness or reasonableness, and held that the scope of Cabinet privilege is a question of central importance to the legal system, warranting a correctness standard. (Note: Ontario (Attorney General) v Ontario (Information and Privacy Commissioner), 2024 SCC 4 at paras 68–71) She further stated that even if the applicable standard were reasonableness, the IPC's analysis and findings would have met that standard, and its decision should have been upheld. (Note: Ontario (Attorney General) v Ontario (Information and Privacy Commissioner), 2024 SCC 4 at paras 81–82)

== Aftermath ==
The majority of the Supreme Court left unresolved the question of the appropriate standard of review for decisions involving Cabinet secrecy. Justice Karakatsanis reasoned that it was unnecessary to determine whether correctness or reasonableness applied under the Vavilov framework, as the outcome would be the same under either standard. (Note: Ontario (Attorney General) v Ontario (Information and Privacy Commissioner), 2024 SCC 4 at para 16) However, Cappe and Campagnolo note that Justice Karakatsanis' focus on the IPC's failure to consider the efficiency rationale, and then offering her own interpretation of the provision opened the decision to criticism that she conducted a correctness review under the guise of reasonableness.

The Supreme Court elevated the status of Cabinet secrecy to the constitutional status of parliamentary privilege and deliberative secrecy, matching the privileges afforded to the legislative and judicial branches of government. The scope of Cabinet secrecy may be expanded to situations in which the premier is acting their capacity as the head of cabinet and the communications of the premier to ministers in the Cabinet, but not when the premier is acting in their personal prerogative capacity. The Court further expanded the scope to include not only the "outcomes or decisions of Cabinet's deliberative process", but also include the "topics of deliberation, and priorities identified by the premier, even if they do not ultimately result in government action". (Note: Ontario (Attorney General) v Ontario (Information and Privacy Commissioner), 2024 SCC 4 at para 62)

In the aftermath of the decision, advocates and journalists such as the Canadian Civil Liberties Association, The Globe and Mail, and CBC News, that the Court's interpretation effectively grants public officials broad discretion to withhold records under the Cabinet exemption to access to information laws.
