= Desgagnés Transport Inc v Wärtsilä Canada Inc =

- Supreme Court of Canada

Hearing: 24 January 2019 Judgment: 28 November 2019
- Full case name: Desgagnés Transport Inc, Desgagnés Transarctik Inc, Navigation Desgagnés Inc, Lloyds Underwriters and Institute of Lloyds Underwriters (ILU) Companies Subscribing to Policy Number B0856 09h0016 and Aim Insurance (Barbados) SCC v Wärtsilä Canada Inc and Wärtsilä Nederland BV
- Citations: 2019 SCC 58
- Docket No.: 37873
- Prior history: APPEAL from Wärtsilä Canada inc. c. Transport Desgagnés inc. 2017 QCCA 1471, [2017] CarswellQue 8576; [2017] JQ no 13424 (29 September 2017); setting aside Transport Desgagnés inc. c. Wärtsilä Canada Inc 2015 QCCS 5514, [2015] CarswellQue 11288; [2015] QJ 12923 (23 November 2015). Leave to appeal granted, Transport Desgagnés Inc, et al v Wärtsilä Canada Inc, et al, 2018 CanLII 65739 (19 July 2018), Supreme Court (Canada).
- Ruling: Appeal allowed

Holding
- The sale of marine engine parts gives rise to a double aspect scenario: a non‑statutory body of federal law and a provincial law, both validly directed at the same fact situation, overlap. Neither interjurisdictional immunity nor federal paramountcy ousts the application of Art. 1733 CCQ; it is therefore ultimately the law governing this dispute. Since art. 1733 is a legislative enactment, Canadian non‑statutory maritime law does not prevail over it.

Court membership
- Chief Justice: Richard Wagner; Puisne Justices: Rosalie Abella, Michael Moldaver, Andromache Karakatsanis, Clément Gascon, Suzanne Côté, Russell Brown, Malcolm Rowe, Sheilah Martin

Reasons given
- Majority: Gascon, Côté and Rowe JJ, joined by Moldaver, Karakatsanis and Martin JJ
- Concurrence: Wagner CJ and Brown J, joined by Abella J

Laws applied
- Civil Code of Quebec; Constitution Act, 1867

Desgagnés Transport Inc v Wärtsilä Canada Inc, 2019 SCC 58 is a major Canadian constitutional law ruling by the Supreme Court of Canada concerning the interplay of federal and provincial jurisdictions under the Constitution Act, 1867.

== Background ==
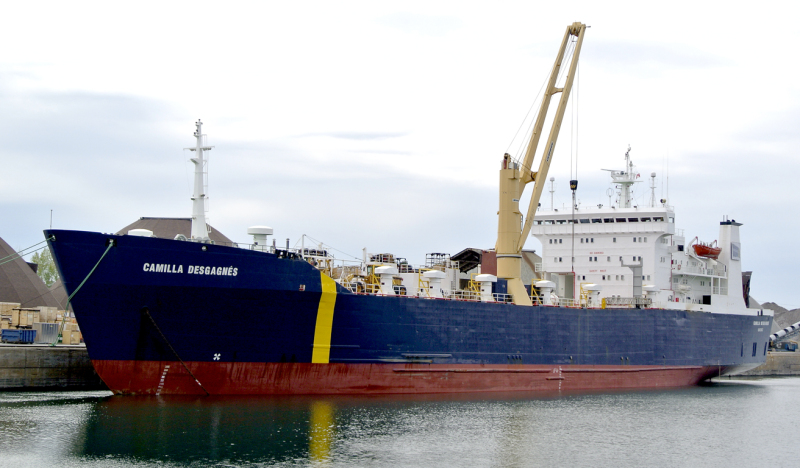
MV Camilla Desgagnés docked for refueling.

In October 2006, Desgagnés Transport (a subsidiary of Groupe Desgagnés, and hereafter abbreviated "D" for brevity) purchased engine parts for its ship MV Camilla Desgagnés from Wärtsilä Canada (the Canadian unit of Wärtsilä, abbreviated "W"). The contract included a limited warranty and limited W's liability to €50,000. The choice of law clause stated that the contract would be governed pursuant to the laws in force at the office of W, which was Montreal. In that regard, a reconditioned crankshaft was mounted onto a new bedplate at W's factory in Zwolle in November 2006 and delivered to the ship at Halifax in February 2007.

The crankshaft sustained a catastrophic failure in October 2009, while the vessel was on route on the Saint Lawrence River near Les Escoumins. D claimed that the incident arose from a latent defect that arose during the original assembly, which W denied. W also stated that the warranty period specified in the contract had already expired, which was allowed under Canadian maritime law, while D submitted that such limitation clauses are not enforceable in Quebec civil law insofar as they concern latent defects.

== The courts below ==
At the Superior Court of Quebec, Paquette SCJ stated that the test was, "Is the activity at stake so integrally connected to maritime matters such that it is practically necessary for Parliament to have jurisdiction over same, in order to properly exercise its legislative power over navigation and shipping?" She held that it was not, the Civil Code of Quebec therefore applied, and ruled that the contract's limitation clauses were void under Art. 1729 CCQ and Art. 1733 CCQ. D was awarded around $5.66 million in damages.

By 2-1, the appeal was allowed at the Quebec Court of Appeal. In the majority ruling, Mainville JA stated that the lower court had erred in law by not noting that Canadian maritime law explicitly included matters concerning the supply of ships as well as their construction and repair. As Canadian maritime law has been held to include the UK Sale of Goods Act 1893 (under which limitation clauses are allowed in sale contracts), W's warranty expiry was held to be valid.

== At the Supreme Court of Canada ==
...the constitutional issues in the present case arise only because the choice of law clause in the agreement ... does not indicate whether Canadian maritime law or Quebec civil law governs the contract.... The clause merely provides that "[t]he Contract shall be governed by and interpreted in accordance with the laws in force at the registered office of the Supplier". We understand that the trial judge interpreted the "office of the Supplier" as referring to Wärtsilä's place of business in Montréal, Quebec, where the contract was formed.... Yet the "laws in force" in Quebec include both provincial and federal laws.... This is why it remains necessary to undertake a constitutional analysis in the present case.

SCC, par. 6

Appeal was allowed with costs throughout, setting aside the judgment of the Court of Appeal and restoring that of the Superior Court. The Justices split 6-3 as to the reasoning behind the ruling, and both sides were at variance with the reasons given by the lower courts.

=== The majority ruling ===
==== Scope of Canadian maritime law ====
The majority began its analysis by first considering the scope of Canadian maritime law, observing that it is:

... the body of admiralty law, which was adopted from England as Canadian maritime law, encompassed both specialized rules and principles of admiralty and the rules and principles adopted from the common law and applied in admiralty cases as these rules and principles have been, and continue to be, modified and expanded in Canadian jurisprudence.

The Court's prior decisions in the field "make clear that Canadian maritime law is a comprehensive body of law, uniform throughout Canada, that purports to deal with all claims in respect of maritime and admiralty matters, subject only to the scope of the federal power over navigation and shipping under s. 91(10) of the Constitution Act, 1867". It is also a distinct body of law:

... while the same Canadian court may now adjudicate common law, civil law, and Canadian maritime law aspects of a dispute, each body of law is distinct within the Canadian system. And when Canadian maritime law validly governs a dispute, that body of law represents a seamless and ubiquitous web that is capable of resolving any legal dispute....

Besides being "a comprehensive body of law", it has also been described as "a seamless web", and, "where Canadian maritime law does not provide a specific rule governing the situation at hand, courts must extract and adopt relevant principles of law from both the common law and civil law, where appropriate, so as to provide for a coherent resolution to the dispute." In 1997, responding to a submission that there was an absence of law concerning a maritime matter, McLachlin J (as she then was) declared:

On the view I take, there is no "gap" that would allow for the application of provincial law. While the federal government has not passed contributory negligence legislation for maritime torts, the common law principles embodied in Canadian maritime law remain applicable in the absence of federal legislation. The question is not whether there is federal maritime law on the issue, but what that law decrees.

In essence, Canadian maritime law is limited only by the constitutional division of powers. In Ordon Estate, the Court stated that:

The first step [when determining whether provincial statutes may apply in a maritime context] involves a determination of whether the specific subject matter at issue in a claim is within the exclusive federal legislative competence over navigation and shipping under s. 91(10)of the Constitution Act, 1867.... The test for making this determination is to ask whether the subject matter under consideration in the particular case is so integrally connected to maritime matters as to be legitimate Canadian maritime law within federal legislative competence.

==== Application to the matter at issue ====
The Court observed that the Court of Appeal's analysis was incomplete, having stopped without considering whether there could be provincial jurisdiction as well in the matter. The majority's division of powers analysis proceeded as follows:

| Stage | Process | Disposition |
|---|---|---|
| Characterizing the matter at issue | The court considers the law's purpose and its effect with a view to identifying the true subject matter — the pith and substance — of the law in question. | "[T]he matter at issue can be characterized, with appropriate precision, as the sale of marine engine parts intended for use on a commercial vessel." |
| Classifying the matter according to the different heads of legislative power: 1. The court determines whether the subject matter of the challenged legislation falls within the head of power being relied on to support the legislation's validity.; 2. Where it does, the legislation will be upheld on the basis that it is intra vires, and therefore valid. | Application of the "integral application" test in matters concerning Canadian maritime law, to ensure that federal law does not encroach on matters coming within provincial legislative powers It encompasses a number of non-exhaustive factors, which may receive different weight depending on the facts of a given case, including: 1. the spatial relationship between the non-maritime and maritime elements of the matter at issue; 2. the functional relationship between those elements, which involves consideration of, inter alia, whether the activity or good implicates seaworthiness, or, more generally, transportation by water; 3. the temporal relationship between those elements; 4. the context surrounding the relationship of the parties to the dispute; 5. the practical importance or necessity of legal uniformity; 6. the fact that the matter implicates standards, principles and practices that are specific to the maritime context or informed by maritime considerations; 7. the historical connection with English maritime law; and 8. relevant precedents. | "[T]he sale of marine engine parts intended for use on a commercial vessel is integrally connected to navigation and shipping so as to come within federal legislative authority." |
| Is there a provincial law that is valid, applicable and operative? (Note: reflecting the current concept of federalism as outlined in Canadian Western Bank v Alberta, 2007 SCC 22, [2007] 2 SCR 3 (31 May 2007)) | Assess whether the double aspect doctrine may apply | 1. Regulating the sale of goods constitutes an exercise of the provincial power over property and civil rights 2. As outlined above, the federal power over navigation and shipping can also apply to the sale of marine engine parts.; 3. Both the Quebec legislature and Parliament have a "compelling interest" in enacting legal rules over different aspects of the same activity or matter.; 4. The two sets of contract rules and principles are thus valid.; 5. Therefore, the CCQ can govern this sale of marine engine parts unless an issue of applicability or operability arises. |
| Does the interjurisdictional immunity doctrine apply? | Two conditions must be met for the doctrine to apply: 1. the impugned provision must trench on the core of an exclusive head of power under the Constitution Act, 1867; 2. the effect of this overlap must impair the exercise of the core of the head of power | The doctrine must be limited to situations already covered by precedents. In this case: 1. the contractual issues raised by D's claim do not engage the core of the federal competence over navigation and shipping; and 2. the core of navigation and shipping neither can nor should be defined in a manner so as to necessarily encompass contractual issues related to the sale of marine engine parts for use on a commercial vessel. |
| Does federal paramountcy come into play? | Assess when valid provincial and federal legislation are incompatible. If such a conflict exists, the federal law prevails and the provincial law is declared inoperative to the extent of the conflict. | The Sale of Goods Act 1893 is not per se an Act of the Parliament of Canada, as it functions as part of the non-statutory portion of Canadian maritime law. " In our view, it would run contrary to the purpose of the federal paramountcy doctrine to declare that the non-statutory rules of Canadian maritime law can prevail over valid provincial legislation." |
Conclusion
In the present case, Art. 1733 CCQ "is therefore operative and governs the dispute ... as it prevails over Canadian non-statutory maritime law following the principle of the primacy of a legislative enactment."

=== The concurrent ruling ===
... Parliament's legislative authority under s. 91(10) is over navigation and shipping, not over Canadian maritime law. This is the language of the Constitution, and avoids the potential overbreadth of focusing on the maritime writ large.

SCC, par. 148

The minority held that jurisdiction was ultimately based on an analysis of its pith and substance, and stated that both courts below had erred in their application of the test. In the present case, it is the "pith and substance" test, and not the "integral application" test, that "must be used to determine whether a matter comes within navigation and shipping or property and civil rights." It also expressed the idea that it may now be time to lay the "integral application" test to rest.

It noted that the Sale of Goods Act 1893 in the English courts was applied by the King's Bench Division, as opposed to the Probate, Divorce and Admiralty Division of the High Court of Justice, and was thus never part of the admiralty law considered by the latter Division. (Note: and therefore not within the scope of admiralty law as constituted within Canadian law) It therefore did not arise in the present context, and so the property and civil rights power within provincial jurisdiction applied.

It further clarified that its ruling did not express an opinion as to whether Parliament could pass legislation with respect to contracts of trade at sea, or whether the "double aspect" doctrine could possibly apply.

== Impact ==
One commentator noted that this decision "has potentially far-reaching implications for contracts and disputes involving the transportation of goods across borders and the construction of projects under federal jurisdiction." Another thought that "maritime lawyers and constitutional experts are going to be parsing this decision for years".

Desgagnés departs from prior jurisprudence of the SCC in the field that held that maritime law must be uniform throughout Canada, and by implication allows for provincial legislation to apply to contracts in industries otherwise governed by federal law. The Court's observation that the paramountcy doctrine did not apply where the Parliament of Canada has not legislated on a particular aspect is seen as an invitation for such action to take place.

By holding that Canadian maritime law is a body of law separate from either common or civil law, and that the dispute could have been avoided by a more precisely worded choice of law clause, parties to future maritime contracts will need to carefully consider consequences of their drafting. However, the Civil Code of Quebec could conceivably prohibit relying on such a clause, as a matter of public order.
