= R v Jordan (2016) =

R. v. Jordan
- Supreme Court of Canada

Hearing: October 7, 2015 Judgment: July 8, 2016
- Full case name: Barrett Richard Jordan v. Her Majesty The Queen
- Citations: [2016] 1 S.C.R. 631
- Docket No.: 36068
- Prior history: Judgment for the Crown in the British Columbia Court of Appeal.
- Ruling: Appeal allowed, stay of proceedings granted

Holding
- A delay of 44 months between the charges and the end of trial violates a person's right to be tried within a reasonable time under section 11 of the Canadian Charter of Rights and Freedoms.

Court membership
- Chief Justice: Beverley McLachlin; Puisne Justices: Rosalie Abella, Thomas Cromwell, Michael Moldaver, Andromache Karakatsanis, Richard Wagner, Clément Gascon, Suzanne Côté, Russell Brown

Reasons given
- Majority: Moldaver, Karakatsanis and Brown JJ., joined by Abella and Côté JJ.
- Concurrence: Cromwell J., joined by McLachlin C.J. and Wagner and Gascon JJ.

R. v. Jordan [2016] S.C.R., 2016 SCC 27 was a decision of the Supreme Court of Canada which rejected the framework traditionally used to determine whether an accused was tried within a reasonable time under section 11(b) of the Canadian Charter of Rights and Freedoms and replaced it with a presumptive ceiling of 18 months between the charges and the trial in a provincial court without preliminary inquiry, or 30 months in other cases.

== Background ==
Section 11 of the Canadian Charter of Rights and Freedoms states that

Any person charged with an offence has the right

[...]

(b) to be tried within a reasonable time

Prior to this ruling, a contextual framework set out in R v Morin was used.

Barrett Richard Jordan was arrested in December 2008 and charged with various offences relating to possession and trafficking. He was released with restrictive bail conditions in February 2009. The preliminary inquiry was set to occur in May 2010, but there was not enough time for the Crown to present all its evidence, so further dates were set throughout 2010 and 2011. In May 2011, Jordan was committed to stand trial. The trial lasted from September to February 2013, bringing the total delay between the charges and the conclusion of the trial to 49.5 months, of which 5.5 were imputable to the accused.

During his initial trial, Jordan brought an application for stay of proceedings under section 11(b), which was dismissed. His appeal to the Supreme Court of British Columbia was dismissed because it was judged Jordan had not suffered significant prejudice as required by the framework. His appeal to the British Columbia Court of Appeal was also rejected.

== Ruling ==
Moldaver, Karakatsanis and Brown JJ., speaking for the majority, found that the framework set out in R v Morin caused significant complications and contributed to a culture of delay and complacency. They pointed out that the application of the framework was unpredictable, relied on the notion of prejudice, which is "confusing, hard to prove, and highly subjective", didn't encourage the courts and parties to prevent delays, and was unduly complex.

They proposed a new framework, based on a ceiling beyond which delay is presumptively unreasonable: 18 months for cases tried in provincial courts without preliminary inquiry, and 30 months for cases tried in provincial courts after a preliminary inquiry or in superior courts. Delays attributable to the defence are however subtracted from the ceiling (ex.: requesting unnecessary postponements, or an insufficient effort to accommodate the scheduling of court appearances), so an accused cannot slow the judicial process to their advantage. Since the delay in trying Jordan had been of 49.5 months, of which 44 were imputable to the Crown or to systemic delays, his appeal was allowed and a stay of proceedings was entered.

== Concurrence ==
Cromwell J. considered that a stay of proceedings for Jordan should be entered under the R v Morin framework, and that the proposed new framework was not desirable. He wrote that:

The proposed approach reduces reasonableness to two numerical ceilings. But doing so uncouples the right to be tried within a reasonable time from the Constitution’s text and purpose in a way that is difficult to square with our jurisprudence; exceeds the proper role of the Court by creating time periods which appear to have no basis or rationale in the evidence before the Court; and risks negative consequences for the administration of justice. … Moreover, the increased simplicity which is said to flow from this approach is likely illusory. The complexity inherent in determining unreasonable delay has been moved into deciding whether to “rebut” the presumption that a delay is unreasonable if it exceeds the ceiling in particular cases.

== Aftermath ==
The ruling had serious immediate consequences, as many persons who had already experienced delays exceeding the presumptive ceiling saw charges against them being dropped. It forced the Crown to change the way it works, including using the direct indictment procedure more frequently. This case decision ruling is informally known as the "Jordan decision", "Jordan ruling", or "Jordan rule".

== See also ==
- List of Supreme Court of Canada cases (McLachlin Court)
