= Reasons of the Supreme Court of Canada by Justice Karakatsanis =

This is a list of the reasons written by Justice Karakatsanis during her tenure as puisne justice of the Supreme Court of Canada.

== By year ==
=== 2012 ===
Statistics

4	Majority or Plurality	0	Concurrence	0	Other
0	Dissent	0	Concurrence/dissent	Total =	4
Written opinions = 4		Oral opinions = 0		Unanimous decisions = 3

Case name	Issue	Co-authored by	Joined by
R v Tse; 2012 SCC 16	Whether s. 184.4 of the Criminal Code infringes the right to be free from unreasonable search and seizure under s. 8 of the Charter	Moldaver J	Unanimous
R v Maybin; 2012 SCC 24	Criminal law – Causation and intervening acts	–	Unanimous
Southcott Estates Inc v Toronto Catholic District School Board; 2012 SCC 51	Contracts – Whether plaintiff seeking specific performance has obligation to mitigate losses	–	LeBel, Deschamps, Abella, Rothstein and Cromwell JJ
R v Davey; 2012 SCC 75	Whether it was appropriate for the Crown to seek personal opinions of local police officers as to the "suitability" of prospective jurors for use in exercise of peremptory challenges; Whether there should have been disclosure of same to the defence; Whether there is a reasonable possibility that such conduct affected trial fairness or gave rise to an appearance of unfairness, such that a miscarriage of justice occurred	–	Unanimous

=== 2013 ===
Statistics

9	Majority or Plurality	1	Concurrence	0	Other
3	Dissent	0	Concurrence/dissent	Total =	13
Written opinions = 13		Oral opinions = 0		Unanimous decisions = 4

Case name	Issue	Co-authored by	Joined by
R v Sanichar; 2013 SCC 4	Whether appellate court erred in setting aside convictions and ordering a new trial	–	McLachlin CJ and Abella, Rothstein, Moldaver and Wagner JJ
Manitoba Metis Federation Inc v Canada (AG); 2013 SCC 14	Aboriginal law and the honour of the Crown	McLachlin CJ	LeBel, Fish, Abella and Cromwell JJ
Penner v Niagara (Regional Police Services Board); 2013 SCC 19	Issue estoppel: administrative tribunal proceedings and civil proceedings	Cromwell J	McLachlin CJ and Fish J
R v Vuradin; 2013 SCC 38	Whether trial judge's reasons for judgment were sufficient and whether trial judge properly applied the burden of proof in a criminal case	–	Unanimous
R v Youvarajah; 2013 SCC 41	Admissibility of hearsay evidence: prior inconsistent statements	–	McLachlin CJ and Fish, Abella and Cromwell JJ
Conseil scolaire francophone de la Colombie-Britannique v British Columbia; 2013 SCC 42	Civil procedure – Admissibility of affidavits in languages other than English under 1731 English Act received into British Columbia law providing English as language of court "proceedings"	–	LeBel and Abella JJ
Ontario v Criminal Lawyers' Association of Ontario; 2013 SCC 43	Jurisdiction of courts – Whether superior and statutory courts have inherent jurisdiction to determine the rate of remuneration of amici curiae	–	McLachlin CJ and Rothstein, Moldaver and Wagner JJ
Marine Services International Ltd v Ryan Estate; 2013 SCC 44	Division of powers – Whether negligence action brought by dependents under federal maritime legislation is prohibited by provincial workers' compensation legislation	LeBel J	Unanimous
R v Chehil; 2013 SCC 49	Unreasonable search and seizure under s. 8 of the Charter and whether police had reasonable grounds to suspect the accused was involved in a drug-related offence	–	Unanimous
Cuthbertson v Rasouli; 2013 SCC 53	Health law – Consent to withdrawal of treatment; whether withdrawal constitutes "treatment" under Ontario Health Care Consent Act	–	Abella J
Sun-Rype Products Ltd v Archer Daniels Midland Co; 2013 SCC 58	Civil procedure – Certification of class actions	–	Cromwell J
McLean v British Columbia (Securities Commission); 2013 SCC 67	Judicial review and standard of review of securities commission decision	–	–
R v McRae; 2013 SCC 68	Offence of uttering threats	Cromwell J	Unanimous

=== 2014 ===
2014 statistics

9	Majority or Plurality	2	Concurrence	0	Other
2	Dissent	0	Concurrence/dissent	Total =	13
Written opinions = 11		Oral opinions = 2		Unanimous decisions = 8

Case name	Issue	Co-authored by	Joined by
Hryniak v Mauldin; 2014 SCC 7	Summary judgments	–	Unanimous
Bruno Appliance and Furniture, Inc v Hryniak; 2014 SCC 8	Summary judgments	–	Unanimous
Reference Re Supreme Court Act, ss 5 and 6; 2014 SCC 21	Eligibility requirements to the Supreme Court of Canada	McLachlin CJ and LeBel, Abella, Cromwell and Wagner JJ	–
Martin v Alberta (Workers' Compensation Board); 2014 SCC 25	Judicial review of workers' compensation decision	–	Unanimous
R v Summers; 2014 SCC 26	Sentencing and credit for pre-sentence detention under the Criminal Code	–	Unanimous
R v Carvery; 2014 SCC 27	Sentencing and credit for pre-sentence detention under the Criminal Code	–	Unanimous
R v Quesnelle; 2014 SCC 46	Whether police occurrence reports prepared in the investigation of unrelated incidents involving a complainant or witness are "records" within the meaning of s. 278.1 of the Criminal Code	–	Unanimous
R v Hart; 2014 SCC 52	Admissibility of "Mr. Big" confessions	–	–
R v Conception; 2014 SCC 60	Mental disorders and dispositions by a court or review board	–	McLachlin CJ and Moldaver and Wagner JJ
British Columbia Teachers' Federation v British Columbia School Employers' Association; 2014 SCC 70	Judicial review of labour arbitration	–	Unanimous (oral)
Wakeling v United States of America; 2014 SCC 72	Unreasonable search and seizure under s. 8 of the Charter and the disclosure of intercepted private communications without consent	–	Abella and Cromwell JJ
R v Wilcox; 2014 SCC 75	Offence of aggravated sexual assault and credibility of complainant	–	Unanimous (oral)
R v Fearon; 2014 SCC 77	Unreasonable search and seizure and search incident to arrest under s. 8 of the Charter	–	LeBel and Abella JJ

=== 2015 ===
Statistics

7	Majority or Plurality	1	Concurrence	0	Other
2	Dissent	1	Concurrence/dissent	Total	11
Written opinions = XXX		Oral opinions = XXX		Unanimous decisions = 3

Case name	Issue	Co-authored by	Joined by
Tervita Corp v Canada (Commissioner of Competition; 2015 SCC 3	Legal test for when a merger gives rise to a substantial prevention of competition under the Competition Act; Defence of statutory efficiencies	–	–
R v Grant; 2015 SCC 9	Appropriate framework for determining the admissibility of defence-led evidence concerning an unknown third-party suspect	–	Unanimous
Quebec (AG) v Canada (AG); 2015 SCC 14	Whether federal legislation abolishing the long-gun registry also containing provision requiring the destruction of long-gun registration data is ultra vires the criminal law power of Parliament under s. 91(27) of the Constitution Act, 1867	Cromwell J	McLachlin CJ and Rothstein and Moldaver JJ
Association des parents de l'école Rose-des-vents v British Columbia (Education); 2015 SCC 21	Minority language education rights and the manner in which courts should assess whether children of rights holders are provided with an educational experience equivalent to that provided in schools of the linguistic majority of the province or territory; Whether a finding of a lack of equivalence amounts to a breach of s. 23 of the Charter	–	Unanimous
Henry v British Columbia (AG); 2015 SCC 24	Wrongful conviction of claimant; Civil action alleging breach of Charter rights resulting from Crown counsel's wrongful non-disclose of relevant information; Whether s. 24(1) authorizes courts to award damages against Crown for wrongful non-disclosure, and the level of fault claimant must establish to meet liability threshold for awarding s. 24(1) damages	McLachlin CJ	–
R v Kokopenace; 2015 SCC 28	Appropriate legal test for representativeness on jury roll; Jury representativeness under ss. 11(d) and (f) and 15 of the Charter	–	–
R v Barabash; 2015 SCC 29	Offence of child pornography and whether the "private use" exception under s 163.1 of the Criminal Code requires a separate and additional inquiry into the minors' exploitation, or whether an exploitation inquiry is included under the lawfulness inquiry	–	Unanimous
Goodwin v British Columbia (Superintendent of Motor Vehicles); 2015 SCC 46	Whether an automatic roadside prohibition scheme enacted under s. 92(13) of the Constitution Act, 1867 is ultra vires provincial authority as being exclusively within federal government's criminal law power under s. 91(27) of the Constitution Act, 1867; Whether same automatic roadside prohibition regime creates an offence within the meaning of s. 11 of the Charter and infringes the presumption of innocence under s. 11(d) of same; Whether same automatic roadside prohibition scheme infringes the right to be secure against unreasonable search and seizure under s. 8 of the Charter	–	Cromwell, Moldaver, Wagner, Gascon and Côté JJ
Caron v Alberta; 2015 SCC 56	Whether provincial Languages Act is ultra vires or inoperative insofar that by requiring provincial laws and regulates to be enacted, printed and published in English only, it abrogates the constitutional duty owed by Alberta to enact, print and publish its laws and regulations in both English and French in Rupert's Land and North-Western Territory Order (1870)	Cromwell J	McLachlin CJ and Rothstein, Moldaver and Gascon JJ
Canadian Broadcasting Corp v SODRAC 2003 Inc; 2015 SCC 57	Intellectual property and copyright	–	–
Canadian Imperial Bank of Commerce v Green; 2015 SCC 60	Limitation period of class actions	–	Moldaver and Gascon JJ

- Tervita Corp v Canada (Commissioner of Competition), 2015 SCC 3 (dissent)
- R v Grant, 2015 SCC 9 (unanimous)
- Quebec (AG) v Canada (AG), 2015 SCC 14 (majority)
- Association des parents de l'école Rose-des-vents v British Columbia, 2015 SCC 21 (unanimous)
- Henry v British Columbia (AG), 2015 SCC 24 (concurrence)
- R v Kokopenace, 2015 SCC 28 (concurrence)
- R v Barabash, 2015 SCC 29 (unanimous)
- Goodwin v British Columbia (Superintendent of Motor Vehicles), 2015 SCC 46 (majority)
- Caron v Alberta, 2015 SCC 56 (majority)
- Canadian Broadcasting Corp v SODRAC 2003 Inc, 2015 SCC 57 (dissent)
- Canadian Imperial Bank of Commerce v Green, 2015 SCC 60 (majority in CIBC and IMAX; dissent in part in Celestica)

=== 2016 ===
2016 statistics

8	Majority or Plurality	1	Concurrence	0	Other
0	Dissent	1	Concurrence/dissent	Total =	10
Written opinions = 10		Oral opinions = 0		Unanimous decisions = 1

Case name	Issue	Co-authored by	Joined by
Carter v Canada (AG); 2016 SCC 4	Motion seeking an order extending the suspension of the declaration of constitutional invalidity issued in Carter v Canada (AG), 2015 SCC 5	Abella, Wagner, Gascon and Côté JJ	–
R v Saeed; 2016 SCC 24	Unreasonable search and seizure under s. 8 of the Charter	–	–
R v Williamson; 2016 SCC 28	Right to be tried within a reasonable time under s. 11 of the Charter	Moldaver and Brown JJ	Abella and Côté JJ
R v Jordan; 2016 SCC 27	Right to be tried within a reasonable time under s. 11 of the Charter	Moldaver and Brown JJ	Abella and Côté JJ
Wilson v Atomic Energy of Canada Ltd; 2016 SCC 29	Unjust dismissal of non-unionized employees under the Canada Labour Code	McLachlin CJ and Wagner and Gascon JJ	–
R v KRJ; 2016 SCC 31	Sentencing and s. 11 of the Charter	–	McLachlin CJ and Cromwell, Moldaver, Wagner, Gascon and Côté JJ
Conférence des juges de paix magistrats du Québec v Quebec (AG); 2016 SCC 39	Provincial legislation amending status of justices of the peace; judicial independence	Wagner and Côté JJ	Unanimous
R v Diamond; 2016 SCC 46	[DESCRIPTION]	–	Wagner and Brown JJ
Edmonton (City of) v Edmonton East (Capilano) Shopping Centres Ltd; 2016 SCC 47	Municipal property assessment for taxation purposes	–	Abella, Cromwell, Wagner and Gascon JJ
Windsor (City of) v Canadian Transit Co; 2016 SCC 54	Jurisdiction of courts	–	McLachlin CJ and Cromwell, Wagner and Gascon JJ

=== 2017 ===
2017 statistics

9	Majority or Plurality	0	Concurrence	0	Other
1	Dissent	1	Concurrence/dissent	Total =	11
Written opinions = 9		Oral opinions = 2		Unanimous decisions = 6

Case name	Issue	Co-authored by	Joined by
Sabean v Portage La Prairie Mutual Insurance Co; 2017 SCC 7	Automobile insurance	–	Unanimous
R v Olotu; 2017 SCC 11	Criminal law – Misapprehension of evidence	–	Unanimous (oral)
R v Bingley; 2017 SCC 12	Expert opinion evidence	–	Gascon J
Pintea v Johns; 2017 SCC 23	Contempt of court	–	Unanimous (oral)
Douez v Facebook, Inc; 2017 SCC 33	Private intentional law – Jurisdiction	Wagner and Gascon JJ	–
R v Bradshaw; 2017 SCC 35	Admissibility of hearsay evidence	–	McLachlin CJ and Abella, Wagner and Brown JJ
Clyde River (Hamlet of) v Petroleum Geo-Services Inc; 2017 SCC 40	Aboriginal treaty rights and the Crown's duty to consult	Brown J	Unanimous
Chippewas of the Thames First Nation v Enbridge Pipelines Inc; 2017 SCC 41	Aboriginal treaty rights and the Crown's duty to consult	Brown J	Unanimous
Association of Justice Counsel v Canada (AG); 2017 SCC 55	Judicial review of a labour arbitrator's interpretation of a collective agreement and management rights clause	–	McLachlin CJ and Abella, Wagner, Gascon, Brown and Rowe JJ
First Nation of Nacho Nyak Dun v Yukon; 2017 SCC 58	Aboriginal treaty rights and honour of the Crown	–	Unanimous
R v Boutilier; 2017 SCC 64	Constitutional law – Fundamental justice and sentencing	–	–
