= Southcott Estates Inc v Toronto Catholic District School Board =

- Supreme Court of Canada

Hearing: 2012-03-20 Judgment: 2012-10-17
- Citations: 2012 SCC 51, [2012] 2 SCR 675
- Docket No.: 33778
- Prior history: APPEAL and CROSS‑APPEAL from Southcott Estates Inc. v. Toronto Catholic School Board, 2010 ONCA 310, 104 OR (3d) 784 (3 May 2010), setting aside Southcott Estates Inc. v. Toronto Catholic District School Board, 2009 CanLII 3567, 78 R.P.R. (4th) 285 (30 January 2009), Superior Court of Justice (Ontario, Canada)
- Ruling: Appeal and cross‑appeal dismissed

Court membership
- Chief Justice: Beverley McLachlin; Puisne Justices: Louis LeBel, Marie Deschamps, Morris Fish, Rosalie Abella, Marshall Rothstein, Thomas Cromwell, Michael Moldaver, Andromache Karakatsanis

Reasons given
- Majority: Karakatsanis J, joined by LeBel, Deschamps, Abella, Rothstein, and Cromwell JJ
- Dissent: McLachlin CJ
- Fish and Rothstein JJ took no part in the consideration or decision of the case.

Southcott Estates Inc v Toronto Catholic District School Board, 2012 SCC 51, [2012] 2 SCR 675, is a landmark case of the Supreme Court of Canada in the area of commercial law, with significant impact in the areas of:

- specific performance in the context of commercial land transactions (together with the related duty of mitigation), and
- piercing the corporate veil for single purpose subsidiaries

== Background ==
Southcott Estates Inc sued the Toronto Catholic District School Board for specific enforcement of a contract to sell it 4.78 acres (1.93 ha) of land. Southcott Estates Inc was a subsidiary of Ballantry Homes Inc, a developer, and special purpose entity created just for purchasing and developing the land. The deal was conditional upon Southcott paying a 10% deposit, and the Toronto School Board getting severance permission from Toronto's Committee of Adjustment before a certain date. However, the Committee refused without reviewing a development plan for the land, which meant severance was not granted in time. Southcott sued for specific performance or damages.

At trial, Southcott stated it never had any intention to mitigate its loss and had not tried, that it had no assets other than the deposit from Ballantry Inc for the deposit, and it was never going to purchase any other land.

== The courts below ==
At the Ontario Superior Court of Justice, Spiegel J held that:

- had the Board used its best efforts, the severance would likely have been granted, and the transaction would have been completed by the closing date; therefore, the Board’s breach caused Southcott’s loss;
- specific performance was not an appropriate remedy as the land did not have the quality of uniqueness; but
- Southcott was entitled to damages, which were assessed at $1,935,500. (Note: representing the loss of a 60 percent chance to make profits in the amount of $3,225,827)

He rejected the Board's submission that Southcott had mitigated damages through several purchases subsequent to the breach of the agreement, declaring:

I find that these subsequent purchases were collateral, independent transactions that did not arise out of the consequences of the breach. In all the circumstances, I do not consider these transactions as mitigatory.

The Board appealed to the Ontario Court of Appeal, where Sharpe JA held that:

- the trial judge did not err in finding that the Board's breach was the cause of the failure to obtain a severance by the closing date, but
- he did err in law in finding that the Board had not shown that Southcott could have mitigated its losses,
- however, Southcott failed to make out a case for either specific performance or damages.

As a result, nominal damages were awarded in the amount of $1.

Leave to appeal and cross-appeal the decision were granted by the Supreme Court of Canada in November 2011:

- Southcott, while not appealing the trial judge’s refusal to award specific performance, maintained its losses were not avoidable.
- On cross-appeal, the Board questioned whether the Court of Appeal was correct in law in dismissing its argument relating to causation.

== At the Supreme Court ==
In a 6-1 ruling, the appeal was dismissed with costs. As it was therefore unnecessary to consider the cross-appeal, it was dismissed without costs.

=== Majority opinion ===
Karakatsanis J began by summarizing the principles for mitigation previously adopted by the Court in Asamera Oil Corporation Ltd. v. Sea Oil & General Corporation where Lord Haldane's observation was endorsed:

The fundamental basis is thus compensation for pecuniary loss naturally flowing from the breach; but this first principle is qualified by a second, which imposes on a plaintiff the duty of taking all reasonable steps to mitigate the loss consequent on the breach, and debars him from claiming any part of the damage which is due to his neglect to take such steps.

The principles have since been refined in further cases at the Court, as well as at the Federal Court of Appeal.

Southcott had argued that, as a single-purpose company, it was impecunious and unable to mitigate without significant capital investment of the parent company or without the corporate mandate to do so. In addition, it would be reasonably foreseeable to those contracting with a single-purpose corporation that such an entity would have finite resources and a confined corporate mandate. This was held to be insufficient:

- The claims relating to specific performance and damages were premised upon resources that were not tied up as a result of the breach alleged, which in this case did not affect Southcott’s ability to obtain capital.
- In the absence of actual evidence of impecuniosity, finding that losses cannot be reasonably avoided simply because it is a single-purpose corporation within a larger group of companies, would give an unfair advantage to those conducting business through single-purpose corporations.
- As a separate legal entity, Southcott was required to mitigate by making diligent efforts to find a substitute property, because those who choose the benefits of incorporation must bear the corresponding burdens, including the duty to mitigate its losses.

Asamera, when read together with Semelhago v. Paramadevan, holds that it "cannot be assumed that damages for breach of contract for the purchase and sale of real estate will be an inadequate remedy in all cases," and specific performance will be available only where money cannot compensate fully for the loss, because of some “peculiar and special value” of the land to the plaintiff.

=== Dissent ===
McLachlin CJ believed that the trial judge was correct in finding in fact that the Board had not proved that Southcott had an opportunity to mitigate, which was sufficient to dispose of the appeal. She would have reversed the Court of Appeal's ruling and restored the original verdict. She saw no basis on which to conclude that Southcott acted unreasonably in maintaining its suit for specific performance instead of mitigating its loss:

1. It had a “fair, real, and substantial justification” for claiming specific performance of the contract.
2. The act of filing a claim for specific performance is inconsistent with the act of acquiring a substitute property.
3. Plaintiffs can never be certain that an action for specific performance will succeed, particularly as this is an equitable, discretionary remedy. Demanding that losses be mitigated unless success in obtaining specific performance is assured would deter valid claims for specific performance and hold plaintiffs to an impossible standard.
4. It can be fairly argued that Southcott did not act unreasonably in pursuing specific performance of the contract. Though the common law presumption of the uniqueness of real property no longer holds, a claim for specific performance may still be reasonable if a property has unique characteristics such that a substitute property is not readily available.
5. Whether it could have obtained financing to buy a different property is at the very least speculative.

== Impact ==
The decision has raised significant debate on many of the issues it discussed:

- Developers normally structure as single-purpose subsidiaries so that, if a market correction reduces land values, the parent company can pull the plug on the subsidiary and avoid liability for damages for not completing a purchase. If the purchaser had backed out, and the land had declined substantially in value, the seller would have been unable to recover any damages beyond the deposit. Therefore, it is arguably fair that Southcott failed to recover damages when the shoe was on the other foot.
- However, the decision (although seen to be well-based in legal theory) does not reflect the commercial reality of real estate development, where lenders are normally reluctant to advance funds to a company with limited assets that is embroiled in litigation, even when backed by a large corporate group.
- While Southcott appears to have significantly restricted the opportunity to pursue specific performance in relation to commercial transactions, it did not conclusively restrict specific performance to residential transactions.
- Although Southcott had admitted at trial that it made no attempts to purchase a comparable property, one can argue that a complete failure to make any efforts to mitigate is tantamount to that type of admission. Either way, damages for breach of contract continue to be the only remedy that the buyer should expect.
- Southcott is significant because it confirms that a claim for specific performance will not insulate a plaintiff from the duty to mitigate. It is also noteworthy because the majority as well as the dissent seem to accept by implication that impecuniosity is a defence to a failure to mitigate.
- In the event of termination of a contract for the purchase of land, a purchaser should carefully consider its capacity to both mitigate and complete the initial transaction before proceeding with a claim for specific performance. Steps should be taken at an early stage in order to prove the uniqueness of the property in question. It can also be argued that such steps should be considered prior to the acquisition of the property.
