= Speaking indictment =

Indictment including statements of alleged events

In the United States, a speaking indictment is an indictment that goes beyond the legally required statement of the elements of the charged offense(s) by including a narrative of the alleged underlying conduct in more detail. Speaking indictments have been used in several special counsel probes, including the federal prosecution of Donald Trump, as part of the Mueller Inquiry into Russian interference with the American political process.
