= Reasons of the Supreme Court of Canada by Justice Gascon =

The following is a list of Supreme Court of Canada opinions written by Clément Gascon during his tenure on the Court.

== 2015 ==
Statistics

6	Majority or Plurality	0	Concurrence	0	Other
2	Dissent	0	Concurrence/dissent	Total =	8
Written opinions = 8		Oral opinions = 0		Unanimous decisions = 2

Case name	Issue	Co-authored by	Joined by
Quebec (AG) v Canada (AG); 2015 SCC 14	Whether federal legislation abolishing the long-gun registry also containing provision requiring the destruction of long-gun registration data is ultra vires the criminal law power of Parliament under s. 91(27) of the Constitution Act, 1867	LeBel and Wagner JJ	Abella J
Mouvement laïque québécois v Saguenay (City); 2015 SCC 16	Whether practice of members of municipal council regulated by a by-law and that consists of reciting prayer at start of each meeting of council is in breach of principle of religious neutrality of state and results in discriminatory interference with freedom of conscience and religion under the Quebec Charter of Human Rights and Freedoms; Whether a decision of the Quebec Human Rights Tribunal is subject to standards of review applicable to judicial review proceedings or to appellate standards	–	McLachlin CJ and LeBel, Rothstein, Cromwell, Moldaver, Karakatsanis and Wagner JJ
Hinse v Canada (AG); 2015 SCC 35	Crown's power of mercy vested in the federal Minister of Justice under the Criminal Code; Standard of fault applicable to Minister's refusal to exercise Crown's power of mercy; Whether, in the case of abuse of process and where there is pro bono agreement, damages can be awarded in Quebec in respect of extrajudicial fees in order to compensate a party who has suffered damages resulting from the fault of another party	Wagner J	Unanimous
Chevron Corp v Yaiguaje; 2015 SCC 42	Private international law – Whether courts have jurisdiction over foreign judgment debtor's subsidiary when the subsidiary is a third party to the judgment for which recognition and enforcement is sought	–	Unanimous
Saskatchewan (AG) v Lemare Lake Logging Ltd; 2015 SCC 53	Whether provincial The Saskatchewan Farm Security Act is constitutionally inoperative when an application is made to appoint a national receiver under the federal Bankruptcy and Insolvency Act, by reason of the doctrine of federal paramountcy	Abella J	Cromwell, Moldaver, Karakatsanis and Wagner JJ
Alberta (AG) v Moloney; 2015 SCC 51	Whether provincial Traffic Safety Act providing for the continued suspension of a debtor's driver's license and motor vehicle permits until payment of judgement debt is constitutionally inoperative by reason of the doctrine of federal paramountcy due to conflict with federal Bankruptcy and Insolvency Act	–	Abella, Rothstein, Cromwell, Moldaver, Karakatsanis and Wagner JJ
407 ETR Concession Co v Canada (Superintendent of Bankruptcy); 2015 SCC 52	Whether provincial Highway 407 Act, 1998 providing for a continuing suspension of debtor's driver's permit until payment of toll debt is constitutionally inoperative by reason of the doctrine of federal paramountcy due to a conflict with the federal Bankruptcy and Insolvency Act	–	Abella, Rothstein, Cromwell, Moldaver, Karakatsanis and Wagner JJ
R v Lacasse; 2015 SCC 64	Sentencing and power of an appellate court	–	McLachlin CJ

== 2016 ==
2016 statistics

9	Majority or Plurality	1	Concurrence	0	Other
0	Dissent	2	Concurrence/dissent	Total =	12
Written opinions = 12		Oral opinions = 0		Unanimous decisions = 5

Case name	Issue	Co-authored by	Joined by
Carter v Canada (AG); 2016 SCC 4	Motion seeking an order extending the suspension of the declaration of constitutional invalidity issued in Carter v Canada (AG), 2015 SCC 5	Abella, Karakatsanis, Wagner and Côté JJ	–
Commission scolaire de Laval v Syndicat de l'enseignement de la région de Laval; 2016 SCC 8	Judicial review of labour arbitration decisions	–	McLachlin CJ and Abella and Karakatsanis JJ
R v Lloyd; 2016 SCC 13	Cruel and unusual treatment or punishment in violation of s. 12 of the Charter	Wagner and Brown JJ	–
Heritage Capital Corp v Equitable Trust Co; 2016 SCC 19	Sale of real property	Côté J	Unanimous
Canada (National Revenue) v Thompson; 2016 SCC 21	Solicitor–client privilege and statutory requirement to provide information for purposes of income tax audit and enforcement	Wagner J	Unanimous
Canada (AG) v Chambre des notaires du Québec; 2016 SCC 20	Whether the Income Tax act and its definition of "solicitor–client privilege" infringes the right against unreasonable search and seizure guaranteed by s. 8 of the Charter	Wagner J	Unanimous
Rogers Communications Inc v Châteauguay (City of); 2016 SCC 23	Division of powers: radiocommunications	–	–
Wilson v Atomic Energy of Canada Ltd; 2016 SCC 29	Unjust dismissal of non-unionized employees under the Canada Labour Code	McLachlin CJ and Karakatsanis and Wagner JJ	–
Lafortune v Financière agricole du Québec; 2016 SCC 35	Quebec government farm income stabilization program	Wagner J	Unanimous
Ferme Vi-ber inc v Financière agricole du Québec; 2016 SCC 34	Quebec government farm income stabilization program	Wagner J	McLachlin CJ and Abella, Cromwell and Karakatsanis JJ
Morasse v Nadeau-Dubois; 2016 SCC 44	Offence of contempt of court	Abella J	McLachlin CJ and Cromwell and Karakatsanis JJ
Lizotte v Aviva Insurance Co of Canada; 2016 SCC 52	Litigation privilege	–	Unanimous

== 2017 ==
2017 statistics

11	Majority or Plurality	0	Concurrence	0	Other
1	Dissent	0	Concurrence/dissent	Total =	12
Written opinions = 11		Oral opinions = 1		Unanimous decisions = 4

Case name	Issue	Co-authored by	Joined by
Ostiguy v Allie; 2017 SCC 22	Real property rights	–	McLachlin CJ and Moldaver, Karakatsanis, Wagner and Brown JJ
Lajeunesse (Re); 2017 SCC 23	Constitutional law – Right to strike	–	Unanimous (oral)
Quebec (Director of Criminal and Penal Prosecutions) v Jodoin; 2017 SCC 26	Awarding of costs against a lawyer personally	–	McLachlin CJ and Moldaver, Karakatsanis, Wagner, Brown and Rowe JJ
Pellerin Savitz LLP v Guindon; 2017 SCC 29	Action for recovery of a lawyer's professional fees	–	Unanimous
Stewart v Elk Valley Coal Corp; 2017 SCC 30	Discrimination based on mental and physical disability	–	–
Teal Cedar Products Ltd v British Columbia; 2017 SCC 32	Standard of review of commercial arbitration awards	–	McLachlin CJ and Abella, Karakatsanis and Wagner JJ
Douez v Facebook, Inc; 2017 SCC 33	Private intentional law – Jurisdiction	Karakatsanis and Wagner JJ	–
R v George; 2017 SCC 38	Defence of mistake of age in sexual assault charges	–	Unanimous
Quebec (AG) v Guérin; 2017 SCC 42	Standard of review of arbitration decisions	Wagner J	McLachlin CJ and Karakatsanis J
Uniprix inc v Gestion Gosselin et Bérubé inc 2017 SCC 43	Contract interpretation and renewal clauses	Wagner J	Abella, Moldaver, Karakatsanis and Brown JJ
Canada (AG) v Thouin; 2017 SCC 46	Civil procedure and immunity	Brown J	Unanimous
Deloitte & Touche v Livent Inc (Receiver of); 2017 SCC 63	Tort of negligence; duty of care and negligent misrepresentation by auditor	Brown J	Karakatsanis and Rowe JJ

* Note: This list is current to November 5, 2016
