= Reasons of the Supreme Court of Canada by Justice Côté =

The following is a list of Supreme Court of Canada opinions written by Suzanne Côté during her tenure on the Court.

== 2015 ==
Statistics

XXXXX	Majority or Plurality	XXX	Concurrence	XXXX	Other
XXXX	Dissent	XXXX	Concurrence/dissent	Total =	XXXXXX
Written opinions = XXX		Oral opinions = XXX		Unanimous decisions = XXX

Case name	Issue	Co-authored by	Joined by
Quebec (Commission des droits de la personne et des droits de la jeunesse) v Bombardier Inc (Bombardier Aerospace Training Center); 2015 SCC 39	Discrimination and right to equality under s. 10 of the Quebec Charter of Human Rights and Freedoms	Wagner J	Unanimous
Saskatchewan (AG) v Lemare Lake Logging Ltd; 2015 SCC 53	Whether provincial The Saskatchewan Farm Security Act is constitutionally inoperative when an application is made to appoint a national receiver under the federal Bankruptcy and Insolvency Act, by reason of the doctrine of federal paramountcy	–	–
Alberta (AG) v Moloney; 2015 SCC 51	Whether provincial Traffic Safety Act providing for the continued suspension of a debtor's driver's license and motor vehicle permits until payment of judgement debt is constitutionally inoperative by reason of the doctrine of federal paramountcy due to conflict with federal Bankruptcy and Insolvency Act	–	McLachlin CJ
407 ETR Concession Co v Canada (Superintendent of Bankruptcy); 2015 SCC 52	Whether provincial Highway 407 Act, 1998 providing for a continuing suspension of debtor's driver's permit until payment of toll debt is constitutionally inoperative by reason of the doctrine of federal paramountcy due to a conflict with the federal Bankruptcy and Insolvency Act	–	McLachlin CJ
Caron v Alberta; 2015 SCC 56	Whether provincial Languages Act is ultra vires or inoperative insofar that by requiring provincial laws and regulates to be enacted, printed and published in English only, it abrogates the constitutional duty owed by Alberta to enact, print and publish its laws and regulations in both English and French in Rupert's Land and North-Western Territory Order (1870)	Wagner J	Abella J
Canadian Imperial Bank of Commerce v Green; 2015 SCC 60	Limitation period of class actions	–	McLachlin CJ and Rothstein J

- Quebec (Commission des droits de la personne et des droits de la jeunesse) v. Bombardier Inc. (Bombardier Aerospace Training Center), 2015 SCC 39 (majority)
- Alberta (Attorney General) v. Moloney, 2015 SCC 51 (concurrence)
- 407 ETR Concession Co. v. Canada (Superintendent of Bankruptcy), 2015 SCC 52 (concurrence)
- Saskatchewan (Attorney General) v. Lemare Lake Logging Ltd., 2015 SCC 53 (dissent)
- Caron v. Alberta, 2015 SCC 56 (dissent)
- Canadian Imperial Bank of Commerce v. Green, 2015 SCC 60 (majority in Celestica; dissent in part in CIBC and IMAX)

== 2016 ==
2016 statistics

7	Majority or Plurality	0	Concurrence	0	Other
9	Dissent	2	Concurrence/dissent	Total =	18
Written opinions = 18		Oral opinions = 0		Unanimous decisions = 4

Case name	Issue	Co-authored by	Joined by
Carter v Canada (AG); 2016 SCC 4	Motion seeking an order extending the suspension of the declaration of constitutional invalidity issued in Carter v Canada (AG), 2015 SCC 5	Abella, Karakatsanis, Wagner and Gascon JJ	–
Commission scolaire de Laval v Syndicat de l'enseignement de la région de Laval; 2016 SCC 8	Judicial review of labour arbitration decisions	–	Wagner and Brown JJ
World Bank Group v Wallace; 2016 SCC 15	Public international law – Jurisdictional immunity	Moldaver J	Unanimous
Krayzel Corp v Equitable Trust Co; 2016 SCC 18	Interest rates on money in arrears	–	Abella and Moldaver JJ
Heritage Capital Corp v Equitable Trust Co; 2016 SCC 19	Sale of real property	Gascon J	Unanimous
Rogers Communications Inc v Châteauguay (City of); 2016 SCC 23	Division of powers: radiocommunications	Wagner J	McLachlin CJ and Abella, Cromwell, Moldaver, Karakatsanis and Brown JJ
British Columbia (Workers' Compensation Appeal Tribunal); 2016 SCC 25	Standard of proof of causation of occupational disease	–	–
Wilson v Atomic Energy of Canada Ltd; 2016 SCC 29	Unjust dismissal of non-unionized employees under the Canada Labour Code	Brown J	Moldaver J
Lapointe Rosenstein Marchand Melançon LLP v Cassels Brock & Blackwell LLP; 2016 SCC 30	Private international law and selection of forum	–	–
Ferme Vi-ber inc v Financière agricole du Québec; 2016 SCC 34	Quebec government farm income stabilization program	–	–
Canada (AG) v Igloo Vikski Inc; 2016 SCC 38	Customs and excise taxation and international trade	–	–
Conférence des juges de paix magistrats du Québec v Quebec (AG); 2016 SCC 39	Provincial legislation amending status of justices of the peace; judicial independence	Karakatsanis and Wagner JJ	Unanimous
Edmonton (City of) v Edmonton East (Capilano) Shopping Centres Ltd; 2016 SCC 47	Municipal property assessment for taxation purposes	Brown J	McLachlin CJ and Moldaver J
Benhaim v St-Germain; 2016 SCC 48	Negligence and medical malpractice	–	Abella and Brown JJ
Royal Bank of Canada v Trang; 2016 SCC 50	Privacy and disclosure of information under Personal Information Protection and Electronic Documents Act ("PIPEDA")	–	Unanimous
Mennillo v Intramodal inc 2016 SCC 51	Reasonable expectations of shareholders	–	–
Alberta (Information and Privacy Commissioner) v University of Calgary; 2016 SCC 53	Privacy, production of documents and solicitor–client privilege	–	Moldaver, Karakatsanis, Wagner and Gascon JJ
Jean Coutu Group (PJC) Inc v Canada (AG); 2016 SCC 55	[DESCRIPTION]	–	Abella J

== 2017 ==
2017 statistics

4	Majority or Plurality	0	Concurrence	0	Other
13	Dissent	1	Concurrence/dissent	Total =	18
Written opinions = 18		Oral opinions = 0		Unanimous decisions = 2

Case name	Issue	Co-authored by	Joined by
Godbout v Pagé; 2017 SCC 18	Automobile insurance and bodily injuries	–	–
Ostiguy v Allie; 2017 SCC 22	Real property rights	–	–
Quebec (Director of Criminal and Penal Prosecutions) v Jodoin; 2017 SCC 26	Awarding of costs against a lawyer personally	Abella J	–
Teal Cedar Products Ltd v British Columbia; 2017 SCC 32	Standard of review of commercial arbitration awards	Moldaver J	Brown and Rowe JJ
Douez v Facebook, Inc; 2017 SCC 33	Private intentional law – Jurisdiction	McLachlin CJ	Moldaver J
Google Inc v Equustek Solutions Inc; 2017 SCC 34	Injunctions barring use and sale of intellectual property	Rowe J	–
Wilson v Alharayeri; 2017 SCC 39	Oppression remedy and personal liability of corporate directors	–	Unanimous
Quebec (AG) v Guérin; 2017 SCC 42	Standard of review of arbitration decisions	–	–
Uniprix inc v Gestion Gosselin et Bérubé inc 2017 SCC 43	Contract interpretation and renewal clauses	–	McLachlin CJ and Rowe J
Montreal (City of) v Dorval; 2017 SCC 48	Civil liability of municipalities	Brown J	
Tran v Canada (Public Safety and Emergency Preparedness); 2017 SCC 50	Immigration – Inadmissibility into Canada on grounds of serious criminality	–	Unanimous
Teva Canada Ltd v TD Canada Trust; 2017 SCC 51	Commercial law – Bills of exchange	Rowe J	McLachlin CJ and Wagner J
Association of Justice Counsel v Canada (AG); 2017 SCC 55	Administrative law – Judicial review of a labour arbitrator's interpretation of a collective agreement and management rights clause	–	Moldaver J
Barreau du Québec v Quebec (AG); 2017 SCC 56	Administrative law – Judicial review of Administrative Tribunal of Québec decision	–	–
R v Sciascia; 2017 SCC 57	Jurisdiction of provincial court trial judge	–	–
R v Jones; 2017 SCC 60	Constitutional law – Admissibility of evidence derived from unreasonable search and seizure	–	McLachlin CJ and Karakatsanis, Moldaver and Gascon JJ
Cowper-Smith v Morgan; 2017 SCC 61	Wills and estates and defence of proprietary estoppel	–	–
R v Boutilier; 2017 SCC 64	Constitutional law – Fundamental justice and sentencing	–	McLachlin CJ and Abella, Moldaver, Wagner, Gascon, Brown and Rowe JJ

* Note: This list is current to November 5, 2016
