= Indictment =

Formal accusation that someone committed a crime

An indictment (/ɪnˈdaɪtmənt/ in-DYTE-mənt) is a formal accusation that a person has committed a crime. In jurisdictions that use the concept of felonies, the most serious criminal offense is a felony. Jurisdictions that do not use that concept often use that of an indictable offence, which is an offence that requires an indictment.

== Australia ==
Section 80 of the Constitution of Australia provides that "the trial on indictment of any offence against any law of the Commonwealth shall be by jury". The High Court of Australia has consistently used a narrow interpretation of this clause, allowing the Parliament of Australia to define which offences proceed on indictment rather than conferring a universal right to a jury trial. Section 4G of the Crimes Act 1914 provides that "offences against a law of the Commonwealth punishable by imprisonment for a period exceeding 12 months are indictable offences, unless the contrary intention appears".

== Canada ==
A direct indictment is one in which the case is sent directly to trial before a preliminary inquiry is completed or when the accused has been discharged by a preliminary inquiry. It is meant to be an extraordinary, rarely used power to ensure that those who should be brought to trial are in a timely manner or where an error of judgment is seen to have been made in the preliminary inquiry. In the aftermath of the 2016 Jordan decision, in which the Supreme Court of Canada imposed time limits on the Crown to bring criminal cases to trial, the Crown has started to use the procedure more frequently.

== United Kingdom ==
=== England and Wales ===
In England and Wales (except in private prosecutions by individuals) an indictment is issued by the public prosecutor (in most cases this will be the Crown Prosecution Service) on behalf of the Crown, which is the nominal plaintiff in all public prosecutions under English law. This is why a public prosecution of a person whose surname is Smith would be referred to in writing as "R v Smith" (where R stands for rex or regina, Latin for 'king' or 'queen' respectively) and when cited orally in court would be pronounced "the Crown against Smith".

All proceedings on indictment must be brought before the Crown Court. By virtue of practice directions issued under section 75(1) of the Senior Courts Act 1981, an indictment must be tried by a High Court judge, a circuit judge or a recorder (which of these depends on the offence).

As to the form of an indictment, see the Indictments Act 1915 and the Indictment Rules 1971 made thereunder.

The Indictment Rules 1971 were revoked by the Criminal Procedure (Amendment) Rules 2007 (on the whole) incorporated into the Criminal Procedure Rules 2010. The form and content and the service of an indictment are governed by Rule 14 of the CPR 2012. Additional guidance is contained in the Consolidated Criminal Practice Direction Part IV.34.

As to the preferring of a bill of indictment and the signing of an indictment, see section 2 of the Administration of Justice (Miscellaneous Provisions) Act 1933 and the Indictments (Procedure) Rules 1971 (SI 1971/2084) made thereunder, as amended and modified by the Indictments (Procedure) (Amendment) Rules 1983 (SI 1983/284), the Indictments (Procedure) (Amendment) Rules 1988 (SI 1988/1783), the Indictments (Procedure) (Amendment) Rules 1992 (SI 1992/284), the Indictments (Procedure) (Amendment) Rules 1997 (SI 1997/711), the Indictments (Procedure) (Modification) Rules 1998 (SI 1998/3045) and the Indictments (Procedure) (Amendment) Rules 2000 (SI 2000/3360).

=== Northern Ireland ===
See the Indictments Act (Northern Ireland) 1945.

=== Scotland ===
In Scotland, all of these cases brought in the High Court of Justiciary are brought in the name of the Lord Advocate and will be tried on indictment. In a sheriff court where trials proceed using the solemn proceedings they will also be tried on indictment and are brought in the name of the Lord Advocate. All solemn indictments are designed in the manner His (or Her) Majesty's Advocate v Smith, or, more frequently HMA v Smith.

== United States ==
The Fifth Amendment of the United States Constitution states in part: "No person shall be held to answer for a capital, or otherwise infamous crime, unless on a presentment or indictment of a Grand Jury, except in cases arising in the land or naval forces, or in the Militia when in actual service in time of War or public danger." The requirement of an indictment has not been incorporated against the states; therefore, even though the federal government uses grand juries and indictments, not all states do. As of 2019, all states besides Pennsylvania and Connecticut still use grand juries to indict suspects for some offenses.

In many jurisdictions that use grand juries, prosecutors often have a choice between seeking an indictment from a grand jury and filing a charging document directly with the court. Such a document is usually called an information, accusation, or complaint, to distinguish it from a grand-jury indictment. To protect the suspect's due process rights in felony cases (where the suspect's interest in liberty is at stake), there is usually a preliminary hearing, at which a judge determines whether there was probable cause to arrest the suspect who is in custody. If the judge finds such probable cause, they bind, or hold over, the suspect for trial.

The substance of an indictment or other charging instrument is usually the same, regardless of the jurisdiction: it consists of a short and plain statement of where, when, and how the defendant allegedly committed the offense. Each offense is usually set out in a separate count. Indictments for complex crimes, particularly those involving conspiracy or numerous counts, may run to hundreds of pages. In other cases, however, an indictment for a crime as serious as murder may consist of a single sheet of paper.

Indictable offenses are tried by jury, unless the accused waives the right to a jury trial. Even though the Sixth Amendment of the Constitution mandates the right to a jury trial in any criminal prosecution, the vast majority of criminal cases in the US are resolved by the plea-bargaining process.

=== Types ===
A sealed indictment stays non-public, for various reasons, until it is unsealed (for example, once the indicted is arrested or notified by police). A superseding indictment takes the place of the previously active one. A speaking indictment goes beyond the legally required statement of the elements of the charged crime(s) and also includes a narrative of the alleged underlying acts in more detail than the law requires.

== See also ==
- Arraignment – Formal reading of the offence to a criminal defendant
- Complaint – Legal document, the filing of which initiates a lawsuit
- Criminal charge – Formal accusation of wrongdoing in common law
- Preliminary hearing – Type of legal proceeding that precedes a trial
