= Preliminary hearing =

Type of legal proceeding that precedes a trial

In common law jurisdictions, a preliminary hearing, preliminary examination, preliminary inquiry, evidentiary hearing or probable cause hearing is a proceeding, after a criminal complaint has been filed by the prosecutor, to determine whether there is enough evidence to require a trial. At such a hearing, the defendant may be assisted by a lawyer.

== Canada ==
In Canada, a preliminary hearing is sometimes referred to as a preliminary inquiry. During the preliminary inquiry, a hearing is held by the court to determine if there is enough evidence to justify a trial. Preliminary inquiries are only held when a person is charged with an indictable offence where the accused is liable to a period of imprisonment greater than 14 years. The Crown Attorney may call witnesses. If there is not enough evidence, the court will dismiss the charge(s).

In the aftermath of the 2016 Jordan decision, in which the Supreme Court of Canada imposed time limits on the Crown to bring criminal cases to trial, the Crown in Ontario has started to use the direct indictment procedure more frequently.

== United Kingdom ==
=== Scotland ===
In Scotland, a preliminary hearing is a non-evidential pre-trial diet in cases to be tried before the High Court of Justiciary, conducted to enable the court to determine whether both parties, the prosecution and the defence, are ready to proceed to trial. The hearing may also address ancillary procedural matters.

== United States ==
In the United States, at a preliminary hearing the judge must find that such evidence provides probable cause to believe that the crime was committed and that the crime was committed by the defendant. There is a right to counsel at the preliminary hearing.

The conduct of the preliminary hearing as well as the specific rules regarding the admissibility of evidence vary from jurisdiction to jurisdiction. If the court decides that there is probable cause, a formal charging instrument (called the information in some jurisdictions) will be issued, and the prosecution will continue. If the court does not find probable cause, then typically the prosecution will cease. Many jurisdictions, however, allow the prosecution to seek a new preliminary hearing or to seek a bill of indictment from a grand jury.

The key questions normally addressed at a preliminary hearing are:

1. Is there probable cause to believe the alleged crime occurred, and did it occur within the court's jurisdiction?
2. Is there probable cause to believe that the defendant committed the crime?

If a judge determines that there is sufficient evidence to believe that the defendant committed the crime, then it is said that the defendant is "bound over".

=== Terminology ===
In criminal prosecutions, the court schedules an arraignment at which the charges are formally presented to the defendant. Several procedures must be done before the arraignment can happen. For example, in most states, the prosecutor first files an “information” document with the court. This filing describes the basic elements (the facts or factors) that make up the alleged criminal offense. Relatedly, the filing enumerates the criminal law(s) that the defendant allegedly violated. Finally, the defendant is scheduled for an arraignment which is when the charge is formally and openly presented. If the defendant pleads not guilty at the arraignment, the court schedules a preliminary hearing.

Where an indictment is obtained through means other than an information document, such as through grand jury proceedings or after an arrest when the defendant is first brought to court, the arraignment may be referred to as an "initial hearing", or "preliminary arraignment", which is different from a preliminary hearing. Those other hearings are not probable cause hearings.

=== State law ===
A preliminary hearing is not always required, and some jurisdictions do not require it. Some states hold preliminary hearings in every serious criminal case. Other states only have a preliminary hearing if the defense requests it; Alternatively, some states only have them for felony cases.

=== Federal law ===
If the defendant is charged with a felony under federal law, the defendant has the right to an indictment by a grand jury, pursuant to the Fifth Amendment to the Constitution and Title 18 of the United States Code. At grand jury proceedings, the defendant is not entitled to have counsel present in the grand jury room (although witnesses may consult with counsel outside of the presence of the grand jury). In some cases, the defendant may not even know that a grand jury is considering the case.

== See also ==
- Article 32 hearing
- Committal procedure
- Grand jury
