= Gérald R. Tremblay =

Canadian lawyer (born 1944)

- Born: 1944 (age 81–82); Jonquière, Quebec
- Awards: Order of Canada; National Order of Quebec

Gérald R. Tremblay, CM OQ QC (born 1944) is a Canadian lawyer practising law in the province of Quebec.

Born in Jonquière, Quebec, he received a Bachelor of Arts degree in 1964 from the Université Laval and his law degree from the University of Ottawa in 1967. He was admitted to the Bar of Quebec in 1968. He was created a Queen's Counsel in 1987.

He was a partner in the law firm McCarthy Tétrault LLP.

Gerald Tremblay started his private law practice with Stikeman Elliott in Montreal and later joined his current firm. He spent the early part of his career representing the federal government in major cases.

In 2003, he was made a Member of the Order of Canada in recognition of being "considered an authority on litigation both in Canada and internationally". In 2005, he was made an Officer of the National Order of Quebec.
