= Michelle O'Bonsawin =

Canadian jurist (born 1973 or 1974)

The Honourable Michelle O'Bonsawin

Puisne Justice of the Supreme Court of Canada
- Incumbent
- Assumed office September 1, 2022
- Nominated by: Justin Trudeau
- Appointed by: Mary Simon
- Preceded by: Michael Moldaver

Justice of the Ontario Superior Court of Justice
- In office May 18, 2017 – September 1, 2022
- Nominated by: Justin Trudeau
- Appointed by: Julie Payette

Personal details
- Born: May 2, 1974 (age 52) Hanmer, Ontario, Canada
- Children: 2
- Education: Laurentian University (BA); University of Ottawa (LLB, PhD); Osgoode Hall (LLM)
- Occupation: Lawyer

Michelle O'Bonsawin (born May 2, 1974) is a Canadian jurist who is serving as a puisne justice on the Supreme Court of Canada since 2022. Before her appointment to the Supreme Court, she served as a judge on the Ontario Superior Court of Justice from 2017 to 2022. O'Bonsawin is the first Indigenous Canadian to serve as a Supreme Court justice.

== Early life ==
O'Bonsawin was born in Hanmer, Ontario, a Franco-Ontarian community near Sudbury on May 2, 1974. Her father was a machinist and her mother worked as a teacher. She is a Franco-Ontarian and an Abenaki member of the Odanak First Nation.

== Early legal career ==
O'Bonsawin began her legal career working for Royal Canadian Mounted Police legal services. O'Bonsawin worked as in-house counsel for Canada Post for nine years before she joined the Royal Ottawa Health Care Group in 2009. There she worked as general counsel and established its legal services department. She also appeared as counsel for the organization on mental-health cases before the Ontario Superior Court and Ontario Court of Appeal as well as tribunals such as Ontario's Consent and Capacity Board and the Ontario Review Board.

While working, she also studied to earn a master's degree in law from Osgoode Hall Law School. She also taught a course on Indigenous peoples and the law at the University of Ottawa Faculty of Law.

=== Ontario Superior Court of Justice ===
In 2017, O'Bonsawin was the first indigenous Canadian to be appointed to the Ontario Superior Court of Justice in Ottawa. She assumed office on May 18, 2017. In her application for the position, she described her legal philosophy as "progressive". Concurrently while working as a judge, O'Bonsawin worked on earning a doctorate in law from the University of Ottawa, and successfully defended her thesis on Gladue principles in February 2022. Her PhD thesis has been embargoed and is not available for public consultation, which has raised concerns and attracted criticism.

In 2017, O'Bonsawin was the trial judge for the case CM Callow Inc v Zollinger, which applied the general organizing principle of good faith contractual performance from the 2014 Supreme Court of Canada case Bhasin v Hrynew. In 2018, the Court of Appeal for Ontario overturned her decision, ruling that she had improperly expanded the duty in a manner not directly linked to the performance of the contract and limited an expressly bargained-for right. In 2020, a majority of the Supreme Court of Canada overruled the Ontario Court of Appeal, reinstated O'Bonsawin's trial award, and provided clarity on the application of Bhasin.

In 2024, the National Post reported that at least two of O'Bonsawin's decisions on the Superior Court of Justice have been reversed by the Ontario Court of Appeal.

In summer 2021, she co-chaired a conference organized by an association for French-speaking judges in Ontario.

In 2021, she was considered a possible candidate to succeed the retiring Rosalie Abella as a Supreme Court justice from Ontario.

== Supreme Court of Canada ==
On August 19, 2022, Prime Minister Justin Trudeau nominated O'Bonsawin to the Supreme Court of Canada to replace retiring Justice Michael Moldaver. On August 24, O'Bonsawin appeared for a special meeting with the Standing Committee on Justice and Human Rights to answer questions from parliamentarians from both the House of Commons and Senate. On August 26, 2022, the Office of the Prime Minister announced that her appointment was formally confirmed and she would join the Supreme Court on September 1, 2022, the same day that Moldaver was retiring. O'Bonsawin is the first Indigenous person to sit on Canada's highest court.

== Personal life ==
O'Bonsawin is Franco-Ontarian and fluently bilingual, and as of May 2022, was taking lessons in the Abenaki language. She is married with two sons.
