= Clément Gascon =

Canadian jurist (born 1960)

Clément Gascon CC KC

Puisne Justice of the Supreme Court of Canada
- In office June 9, 2014 – September 15, 2019
- Nominated by: Stephen Harper
- Preceded by: Morris Fish
- Succeeded by: Nicholas Kasirer

Justice of the Quebec Court of Appeal
- In office 2012–2014

Justice of the Quebec Superior Court
- In office 2002–2012

Personal details
- Born: February 5, 1960 (age 66) Montreal, Quebec
- Education: Collège Jean-de-Brébeuf (DEC 1978); McGill University (BCL 1981)
- Profession: civil and commercial lawyer, judge

Clément Gascon CC KC (born September 5, 1960) is a Canadian jurist, who was nominated to the Supreme Court of Canada by Prime Minister Stephen Harper on June 3, 2014, and officially appointed the Court on June 9, 2014. He retired from the court on September 15, 2019.

Prior to his Supreme Court appointment, Gascon served on the Quebec Superior Court from 2002 to 2012, and the Quebec Court of Appeal from 2012 to 2014. He was previously a lawyer for the Montreal law firm Heenan Blaikie for 21 years.

== Early life ==
Born in 1960 to Dr. Bernard Gascon and Denyse Clément, Gascon graduated from Collège Jean-de-Brébeuf and McGill University.

Gascon was admitted to the Quebec Bar in 1982 and in addition to his legal practice (in business, labour and construction law) was also a lecturer at Cégep de Saint-Jean-sur-Richelieu, Université du Québec à Montreal, McGill University and Bar of Quebec.

== Supreme Court Tenure ==
=== Appointment ===
On June 3, 2014, Prime Minister Stephen Harper announced the appointment of Gascon to the Supreme Court, with effect the following week, to take up the seat previously occupied by Justice Morris Fish, who left the court more than nine months earlier shortly prior to his mandatory retirement date.

Gascon's appointment filled a long vacancy and formally closed a highly contentious and unusually political charged chapter in Canadian judicial appointment process. In response to a court challenge, the government referred the eligibility of Harper's previous nominee for the seat, Justice Marc Nadon of the Federal Court of Appeal, to the Supreme Court, and the appointment was struck down in March 2014 as unconstitutional in Reference Re Supreme Court Act, ss 5 and 6. The decision was followed by a highly public spat between the conservative government and Chief Justice Beverley McLachlin, with government sources alleging the Chief Justice having lobbied against Justice Nadon’s appointment in the previous year.

Gascon's appointment was the first justice in a decade to join the court without the appointment being subject to any parliamentary scrutiny. Following the failed nomination of Nadon, the government opted to bypass the customary parliamentary panel convened in the ten years preceding for either shortlisting or holding public hearing. Unlike Nadon however, Gascon's appointment was broadly well received in recognition of his intellectual rigour and due deference to precedents, and was praised by opposition MPs and members of the legal community who were vocally critical of the government handling of the previous nomination. Gascon took his seat at the Supreme Court on October 6, 2014, bringing the proportion of the court's seats being filled by Harper to two-thirds.

=== Selected Notable Decisions ===
His 2017 dissent in the case Stewart v Elk Valley Coal Corp received renewed interest after his resignation. His dissent noted the stigma surrounding drug dependence and highlighted how society's and the judiciary's objectiveness in assessing discrimination claims are impaired by the widely held perception that individuals afflicted with drug addictions are the authors of their own misfortune, or that their concerns are less credible than those of people suffering from other disabilities. Gascon warned of the risk of such reasoning leading to contributory fault defences for discrimination cases and further discrimination and marginalization of already disadvantaged groups.

In June 2018, Gascon wrote for the majority of the court when it found that the Canadian Human Rights Tribunal's determination that the Indian Act did not violate the Canadian Human Rights Act was reasonable. Three concurring justices instead argued that this context was not due judicial deference and instead required review for correctness.

=== Resignation and public acknowledgement of mental health issues ===
On April 15, 2019, Gascon announced that he would be retiring effective September 15, 2019.

On the evening of May 8, 2019, the Ottawa Police Service issued a notice asking for the public's help in locating Gascon, who had not been seen since early the same afternoon. Shortly afterwards, they announced that he had been located safely. Gascon released a statement a week later stating that he had a panic attack, related in part to his recent decision to retire early from the Court, and acknowledging that, "For over 20 years, I have been dealing with a sometimes insidious illness: depression and anxiety disorders,"

Gascon sat in hearings following the announcement until the end of the court sitting season, and participated in deliberation of judgements until his effective resignation date.

==== Impact on public discourse ====
Gascon was widely praised for his courage in publicly acknowledging mental health affliction as the cause of his brief disappearance, and was credited for destigmatizing the discussion around mental health, particularly in the areas of depression and anxiety, in the legal community. The unified supportive front by his Supreme Court peers and the outpouring of support from the legal community at large drew many public comparisons to the cruel treatment of Justice Gerald Le Dain, who was swiftly and unceremoniously forced off the court by Chief Justice Brian Dickson in 1988 after his mental health challenges were disclosed to Dickson.

In the years following his resignation, Gascon gave a number of public interviews and speeches in which he opened up about his struggle with anxiety and depression, which he said he had been concealing since his mid-30s.

== Post Supreme Court ==
Gascon returned to private practice after stepping down from the Supreme Court.

In 2021, Gascon was appointed one of the seven judges of the Administrative Tribunal of the International Labour Organization for a five-year term.

== Honour & Recognition ==
In 2022, The Canadian Bar Association named Gascon as its annual President's Award honouree, with specific recognition for his contribution toward destigmatizing discussions around mental wellbeing in the legal profession.

Gascon was appointed to the Order of Canada in June 2023, to its highest grade, Companion, with the following citation

Clément Gascon has made extraordinary contributions to Canadian law. His illustrious, five-decade-long career as a litigator, adjudicator and jurist was highlighted by his 2014 appointment to the country’s highest judicial body, the Supreme Court of Canada. Now in private practice, he continues to have a profound impact on the Canadian legal community by drawing on his own lived experiences in an ongoing quest to destigmatize mental illness.

== See also ==
- Reasons of the Supreme Court of Canada by Justice Gascon
