= Suzanne Côté =

Canadian Supreme Court justice

The Honourable Suzanne Côté

Puisne Justice of the Supreme Court of Canada
- Incumbent
- Assumed office December 1, 2014
- Nominated by: Stephen Harper
- Appointed by: David Johnston
- Preceded by: Louis LeBel

Personal details
- Born: September 21, 1958 (age 68) Cloridorme, Québec, Canada
- Spouse: Gérald R. Tremblay
- Education: Université Laval

Suzanne Côté (born September 21, 1958) is a puisne justice of the Supreme Court of Canada. She was nominated by Prime Minister Stephen Harper to replace retiring Justice Louis LeBel. Before her appointment to the Supreme Court, she was a partner at Osler, Hoskin & Harcourt LLP and previously Stikeman Elliott LLP in Montréal. She is the first woman appointed to the Supreme Court directly from private practice.

== Early life and education ==
Côté had wanted to be a lawyer since age 11. While her mother wanted her to become a teacher, as a child Suzanne enjoyed reading about high-profile legal cases. Côté did her legal studies at the Faculté de droit de l'Université Laval.

== Career ==
While a student, Côté worked at a small law firm in Gaspé. She bought half of her employer's practice. Côté was called to the Bar of Quebec in 1981. She went on to become a partner at Stikeman Elliott LLP in Montréal, and later Osler, Hoskin & Harcourt LLP. At Osler, Hoskin & Harcourt, she oversaw the firm's Montreal office litigation group while her own practice area centred around complex civil and commercial cases. Her clients in private practice included Jean Pelletier, who once served as chief of staff to Prime Minister Jean Chretien, and Imperial Tobacco. She defended Imperial Tobacco in a 2012 class-action lawsuit by arguing that the public had been aware of the negative effects of smoking since the 1960s.

Côté has taught courses at Université de Montréal, the Université du Québec à Rimouski, and at the Bar of Quebec.

=== Supreme Court of Canada ===
She was nominated to the Supreme Court of Canada by Prime Minister Stephen Harper to replace retiring justice Louis LeBel. She was appointed a puisne justice on December 1, 2014. She is the first woman appointed directly from private practice.

In June 2018, Côté wrote a concurrence when the majority found that the Canadian Human Rights Tribunal's determination that the Indian Act did not violate the Canadian Human Rights Act was reasonable due to judicial deference, in which she argued instead that the Tribunal's decision was correct.

In June 2020, Côté dissented alone when the majority found that an arbitration clause in a standard form contract was void for unconscionability in Uber Technologies Inc v Heller.

In March 2021, the Supreme Court found that the federal government's carbon price regime is constitutional. Côté was one of three dissenting justices. In her decision, she agreed carbon pricing is a matter of “national concern,” but disagreed that the federal law was constitutional as written.

== Personal life ==
Côté is married to Gerald R. Tremblay, who is a lawyer practicing in the province of Quebec.

== See also ==
- Reasons of the Supreme Court of Canada by Justice Côté
