= Andromache Karakatsanis =

Canadian jurist (born 1955)

The Honourable Andromache Karakatsanis

Puisne Justice of the Supreme Court of Canada
- Incumbent
- Assumed office October 21, 2011
- Nominated by: Stephen Harper
- Preceded by: Louise Charron

Personal details
- Born: October 3, 1955 (age 70) Toronto, Ontario, Canada
- Spouse: Tom Karvanis
- Education: Victoria College, Toronto (BA); York University (LLB)

Andromache Karakatsanis (born October 3, 1955) is a Canadian jurist. She was nominated to the Supreme Court of Canada by Stephen Harper in October 2011. She is the first Greek-Canadian judge on the Court. Since the retirement of Rosalie Abella on July 1, 2021, and of Michael Moldaver on September 1, 2022 (he took office the same day as Karakatsanis), she is the longest-serving member of the Supreme Court.

== Early life ==
Karakatsanis was born in Toronto, Ontario, to Greek parents, and raised with an emphasis on her Greek heritage. She grew up near the Don Mills Road and Lawrence Avenue area of Toronto, where her parents owned a restaurant called Top of the Mall which was where Karakatsanis worked as a hostess and helped her father manage the restaurant.

She attended Victoria College at the University of Toronto, graduating with a B.A. in English literature in 1977. She then attended York University's Osgoode Hall Law School, receiving her LL.B. in 1980. She was called to the Ontario bar in 1982.

== Career ==
After her call to the bar, Karakatsanis clerked for the judges of the Ontario Court of Appeal from 1982 to 1983, after which she entered private practice. In 1987, Karakatsanis was appointed to the Liquor Licensing Board of Ontario as Vice-Chair, becoming Chair and CEO the following year. She held that position until her 1995 appointment as Assistant Deputy Attorney General and Secretary of the Ontario Native Affairs Secretariat. Karakatsanis was named Deputy Attorney General for the province of Ontario in 1997, and she became Secretary of the Cabinet and Clerk of the Executive Council of the Government of Ontario in 2000.

Karakatsanis's judicial career began when she was appointed to the Ontario Superior Court of Justice in December 2002, where she developed an expertise in administrative law. She was subsequently elevated to the Ontario Court of Appeal on March 26, 2010, where she served for 19 months prior to her appointment to the Supreme Court.

Her mandatory retirement date will be October 3, 2030, her 75th birthday.

== Honours ==
In 2015, she was made a Grand Commander of the Order of Honour by the Government of Greece.

On October 13, 2023, she received an honorary Doctor of Laws Degree from York University.

== Personal life ==
Karakatsanis is fluent in English, French and Greek. She is married to former lawyer Tom Karvanis, who lives with multiple sclerosis, and has two children: Paul Karvanis, formerly counsel at Hudson's Bay Company and now with a firm called Leader Rising, and Rhea Karvanis, a graduate of the University of Toronto law school.

== See also ==
- Reasons of the Supreme Court of Canada by Justice Karakatsanis
