= 2022 reasons of the Supreme Court of Canada =

The table below lists the decisions (known as reasons) delivered from the bench by the Supreme Court of Canada during 2022. The table illustrates what reasons were filed by each justice in each case, and which justices joined each reason.

== Reasons ==
Delivered the Court's reason
Joined the Court's reason
Filed a concurrence
Joined a concurrence
Filed a dissent
Joined a dissent
Filed a concurrence/dissent
Joined a concurrence/dissent
Did not participate in the judgment
Did not participate in the final disposition of the judgment
Not a member of the Court at the time of hearing or delivering
- Decisions that do not note a Justice delivering the Court's reason are per coram.
- Multiple concurrences and dissents within a case are numbered, with joining votes numbered accordingly. Justices occasionally join multiple reasons in a single case; each vote is subdivided accordingly.
- Multiple unnumbered reasons are jointly written or delivered.
- Decisions that are given orally from the bench are denoted by a "V"; per coram decisions delivered orally from the bench only note a "V" on the most senior justice on the panel.
- An asterisk ( * ) in the Court's opinion denotes that it was only a majority in part or a plurality.

Case name	Argued	Decided	Wagner	Moldaver	Karakatsanis	Côté	Brown	Rowe	Martin	Kasirer	Jamal	O'Bonsawin
R v Ali, 2022 SCC 1	January 14, 2022	January 14, 2022		V		V
R v Boulanger, 2022 SCC 2	February 9, 2022	February 9, 2022								V
R v Ste-Marie, 2022 SCC 3	February 10, 2022	February 10, 2022								V
R v A.E., 2022 SCC 4	February 15, 2022	February 15, 2022		V
R v Brunelle, 2022 SCC 5	March 15, 2022	March 15, 2022	V
Anderson v Alberta, 2022 SCC 6	November 4, 2021	March 18, 2022
R v White, 2022 SCC 7	March 18, 2022	March 18, 2022			V
R v Pope, 2022 SCC 8	March 21, 2022	March 21, 2022	V
R v Samaniego, 2022 SCC 9	November 5, 2021	March 25, 2022
R v Vallières, 2022 SCC 10	November 12, 2021	March 31, 2022
Case name	Argued	Decided	Wagner	Moldaver	Karakatsanis	Côté	Brown	Rowe	Martin	Kasirer	Jamal	O'Bonsawin
R v Stairs, 2022 SCC 11	November 2, 2021	April 8, 2022
R v Tim, 2022 SCC 12	October 7, 2021	April 8, 2022
R v Gerrard, 2022 SCC 13	April 19, 2022	April 19, 2022		V
R v Alas, 2022 SCC 14	April 21, 2022	April 21, 2022	V
R v J.D., 2022 SCC 15	November 10, 2021	April 22, 2022
R v Dussault, 2022 SCC 16	December 3, 2021	April 29, 2022
R v J.F., 2022 SCC 17	November 30, 2021	May 6, 2022
R v Brown, 2022 SCC 18	November 9, 2021	May 13, 2022
R v Sullivan, 2022 SCC 19	October 12, 2021	May 13, 2022
R v Badger, 2022 SCC 20	May 17, 2022	May 17, 2022		V
Case name	Argued	Decided	Wagner	Moldaver	Karakatsanis	Côté	Brown	Rowe	Martin	Kasirer	Jamal	O'Bonsawin
R v Safdar, 2022 SCC 21	May 18, 2022	May 18, 2022					V
Barendregt v. Grebliunas, 2022 SCC 22	December 1 and 2, 2021	May 20, 2022
R v Bissonnette, 2022 SCC 23	March 24, 2022	May 27, 2022
B.J.T. v. J.D., 2022 SCC 24	December 1 and 2, 2021	June 3, 2022
R. v. Goforth, 2022 SCC 25	December 7, 2021	June 10, 2022
Canada (Attorney General) v. Collins Family Trust, 2022 SCC 26	January 11, 2022	June 17, 2022
British Columbia (Attorney General) v. Council of Canadians with Disabilities, 2022 SCC 27	January 12 and 13, 2022	June 23, 2022
R. v. J.J., 2022 SCC 28	October 5 and 6, 2021	June 30, 2022				3	1	2
Law Society of Saskatchewan v. Abrametz, 2022 SCC 29	November 8, 2021	July 8, 2022
SOCAN v. ESA, 2022 SCC 30	January 18, 2022	July 15, 2022
Case name	Argued	Decided	Wagner	Moldaver	Karakatsanis	Côté	Brown	Rowe	Martin	Kasirer	Jamal	O'Bonsawin
R v. Sundman, 2022 SCC 31	December 9, 2021	July 21, 2022
R v. Lafrance, 2022 SCC 32	December 3, 2021	July 22, 2022
R v. Kirkpatrick, 2022 SCC 33	November 3, 2021	July 29, 2022
R v. Schneider, 2022 SCC 34	December 10, 2021	October 7, 2022
R v. Tessier, 2022 SCC 35	December 6, 2021	October 14, 2022
Annapolis Group Inc. v. Halifax Regional Municipality, 2022 SCC 36	February 16, 2022	October 23, 2022
R. v. Nahanee, 2022 SCC 37	March 16, 2022	October 27, 2022
R. v. Ndhlovu, 2022 SCC 38	February 8, 2022	October 28, 2022
R. v. Sharma, 2022 SCC 39	March 23, 2022	November 4, 2022
R v Doxtator, 2022 SCC 40	November 9, 2022	November 9, 2022								V
Case name	Argued	Decided	Wagner	Moldaver	Karakatsanis	Côté	Brown	Rowe	Martin	Kasirer	Jamal	O'Bonsawin
Peace River Hydro Partners v Petrowest Corp, 2022 SCC 41	January 19, 2022	November 10, 2022
Des Groseillers v. Quebec (Agence du revenu), 2022 SCC 42	November 3, 2022	November 17, 2022
Nova Chemicals Corp. v. Dow Chemical Co., 2022 SCC 43	April 20, 2022	November 18, 2022
R. v. Ramelson, 2022 SCC 44	May 17, 2022	November 24, 2022
R. v. Jaffer, 2022 SCC 45	May 17, 2022	November 24, 2022
R. v. Haniffa, 2022 SCC 46	May 17, 2022	November 24, 2022
R. v. Dare, 2022 SCC 47	May 17, 2022	November 24, 2022
Canada (Transportation Safety Board) v. Carroll-Byrne, 2022 SCC 48	March 17, 2022	November 25, 2022
R. v. Clark, 2022 SCC 49	November 30, 2022	November 30, 2022			V
R. v. D.R., 2022 SCC 50	December 1, 2022	December 1, 2022						V
Case name	Argued	Decided	Wagner	Moldaver	Karakatsanis	Côté	Brown	Rowe	Martin	Kasirer	Jamal	O'Bonsawin
F. v. N., 2022 SCC 51	April 12, 2022	December 2, 2022
R. v. Furey, 2022 SCC 52	December 2, 2022	December 2, 2022			V
R. v. Vernelus, 2022 SCC 53	December 6, 2022	December 6, 2022								V
R. v. Beaver, 2022 SCC 54	February 14, 2022	December 9, 2022
