= 2023 reasons of the Supreme Court of Canada =

The table below lists the decisions (known as reasons) delivered from the bench by the Supreme Court of Canada during 2023. The table illustrates what reasons were filed by each justice in each case, and which justices joined each reason.

== Reasons ==
Delivered the Court's reason
Joined the Court's reason
Filed a concurrence
Joined a concurrence
Filed a dissent
Joined a dissent
Filed a concurrence/dissent
Joined a concurrence/dissent
Did not participate in the judgment
Did not participate in the final disposition of the judgment
Not a member of the Court at the time of hearing or delivering
- Decisions that do not note a Justice delivering the Court's reason are per coram.
- Multiple concurrences and dissents within a case are numbered, with joining votes numbered accordingly. Justices occasionally join multiple reasons in a single case; each vote is subdivided accordingly.
- Multiple unnumbered reasons are jointly written or delivered.
- Decisions that are given orally from the bench are denoted by a "V"; per coram decisions delivered orally from the bench only note a "V" on the most senior justice on the panel.
- An asterisk ( * ) in the Court's opinion denotes that it was only a majority in part or a plurality.

Case name	Argued	Decided	Wagner	Moldaver	Karakatsanis	Côté	Brown	Rowe	Martin	Kasirer	Jamal	O'Bonsawin	Moreau
R. v. S.S., 2023 SCC 1	January 10, 2023	January 10, 2023	V
R. v. Hills, 2023 SCC 2	March 22, 2022	January 27, 2023
R v Hilbach, 2023 SCC 3	March 22, 2022	January 27, 2023
R v McGregor, 2023 SCC 4	May 19, 2022	February 17, 2023			1			2	1
R v Downes, 2023 SCC 5	October 13, 2022	March 10, 2023
R v Chatillon, 2023 SCC 7	March 15, 2023	March 15, 2023	V
R v McColman, 2023 SCC 8	November 1, 2022	March 23, 2023
R v Breault, 2023 SCC 9	September 14, 2022	April 13, 2023
Murray‑Hall v. Quebec (Attorney General), 2023 SCC 10	September 15, 2022	April 14, 2023
Case name	Argued	Decided	Wagner	Moldaver	Karakatsanis	Côté	Brown	Rowe	Martin	Kasirer	Jamal	O'Bonsawin	Moreau
R v Haevischer, 2023 SCC 11	October 4, 2022	April 28, 2023
R v Hanan, 2023 SCC 12	April 17, 2023	May 5, 2023
Anderson v. Anderson, 2023 SCC 13	December 5, 2022	May 12, 2023
Hansman v. Neufeld, 2023 SCC 14	October 11, 2022	May 19, 2023
R v Hay, 2023 SCC 15	May 19, 2023	May 19, 2023	V
Deans Knight Income Corp. v. Canada, 2023 SCC 16	November 2, 2022	May 26, 2023
Canadian Council for Refugees v. Canada (Citizenship and Immigration), 2023 SCC 17	October 6, 2022	June 16, 2023
R. v. Basque, 2023 SCC 18	November 8, 2022	June 30, 2023
R. v. Abdullahi, 2023 SCC 19	January 11, 2023	July 14, 2023
R. v. Kahsai, 2023 SCC 20	March 14, 2023	July 28, 2023
Case name	Argued	Decided	Wagner	Moldaver	Karakatsanis	Côté	Brown	Rowe	Martin	Kasirer	Jamal	O'Bonsawin	Moreau
Mason v. Canada (Citizenship and Immigration), 2023 SCC 21	November 29, 2022	September 27, 2023
La Presse inc. v. Quebec, 2023 SCC 22	May 16 and 17, 2023	October 6, 2023
Reference re Impact Assessment Act, 2023 SCC 22	March 21, 22, 2023	October 13, 2023
R. v. Johnson, 2023 SCC 24	March 21, 22, 2023	October 13, 2023								V
Ponce v. Société d’investissements Rhéaume ltée, 2023 SCC 25	January 12, 2023	October 27, 2023
R. v. Bertrand Marchand, 2023 SCC 26	February 15, 16, 2023	November 3, 2023
Canadian Broadcasting Corp. v. Manitoba, 2023 SCC 27	October 19, 2023	October 19, 2023
R. v. Greater Sudbury (City), 2023 SCC 28	October 12, 2022	November 10, 2023			1	2		1				1
Sharp v. Autorité des marchés financiers, 2023 SCC 29	January 18, 2023	November 17, 2023
R. v. Zacharias, 2023 SCC 30	May 15, 2023	December 1, 2023
Case name	Argued	Decided	Wagner	Moldaver	Karakatsanis	Côté	Brown	Rowe	Martin	Kasirer	Jamal	O'Bonsawin	Moreau
Commission scolaire francophone des Territoires du Nord-Ouest v. Northwest Territories, 2023 SCC 31	February 9, 2023	December 8, 2023
R. v. B.E.M., 2023 SCC 32	December 8, 2023	December 8, 2023								V
R. v. Lindsay, 2023 SCC 33	December 14, 2023	December 14, 2023									V
R. v. Lawlor, 2023 SCC 34	December 15, 2023	December 15, 2023								V		V
