= 2025 judgments of the Supreme Court of Canada =

Supreme Court of Canada Cour suprême du Canada
- Established: April 8, 1875
- Jurisdiction: General court of appeal for Canada
- Motto: Justitia et Veritas
- Authorized by: Supreme Court Act, RSC 1985, c. S-26
- Appeals from: Provincial and federal courts of appeal
- Judge term length: Retirement at age 75
- Number of positions: Nine
- Language: English and French
- Website: Supreme Court of Canada

This article lists the judgments delivered by the Supreme Court of Canada during 2025. The judgments are listed in chronological order, starting with the first judgment of the year, rendered on January 21, 2025, and ending with the last judgment, rendered on December 19, 2025. The table gives a general illustration of the positions taken by each justice in each case, and how justices concurred or dissented with the decisions of the majority.

The Supreme Court normally reserves its judgment after hearing argument on an appeal, and then gives its judgment at some later date by depositing the judgment and reasons with the Registrar of the Supreme Court. On average, judgments in reserved cases are given within six months of the hearing date. In some cases, the court may give its judgment from the bench at the conclusion of the hearing, with a short outline of its reasons. Those judgments are indicated in the table. The court may also give its decision on an appeal from the bench at the conclusion of the hearing, reasons to follow at a later date. Those judgments are included on the date reasons are given, which may be in a subsequent year.

This table includes cases which were argued in a previous year and reserved, with the judgment given in 2025. Cases which were heard in 2025 and reserved, with judgment in a later year, are included in the article for the later year.

In 2025, the Supreme Court decided forty-four appeals.

There were no changes in the court's membership in 2025.

== Judgments ==
By the Court (C)
Unanimous reasons for judgment (U)
Concurred in the unanimous reasons (C–U)
Majority reasons for judgment (M)
Concurred in the majority (C–M)
Concurring reasons (C–R)
Concurred in the concurring reasons (C–C)
Plurality reasons (P)
Concurred in the plurality reasons (C–P)
Dissenting reasons (D)
Concurred in the dissent (C–D)
Dissenting in part (D–P)
Concurred in the partial dissent (C–DP)
Seriatim reasons (S)
Concurred in seriatim reasons (C–S)
Motion (Mo)
Did not sit on the appeal (NS)
Did not participate in the judgment (NP)
Not a Justice of the Court at the time of hearing or judgment (NJ)
- "Decision by the Court" means that it is a unanimous judgment of the Court, not attributed to any particular justice.
- "Unanimous reasons for judgment" indicated a unanimous decision, written by a particular justice.
- Multiple concurrences and dissents within a case are numbered, with concurrences by other numbered accordingly. Justices occasionally concur in multiple reasons in a single case; each concurrence is subdivided accordingly.
- Reasons are sometimes drafted jointly by two or more justices.
- Decisions that are given orally from the bench are denoted by "Bench" on the justice who gave the oral decision.

Case name	Argued	Decided	Wagner	Karakatsanis	Côté	Rowe	Martin	Kasirer	Jamal	O'Bonsawin	Moreau
R. v. Hanrahan, 2025 SCC 1	Jan 21, 2025	Jan 21, 2025	Bench; M	NS	C–M	C–M	NS	D Joint	D Joint	C–M	C–M
R. v. Bilodeau, 2025 SCC 2	Feb 19, 2025	Feb 19, 2025	Bench; U	C–U	C–U	C–U	C–U	NS	C–U	C–U	NS
R. v. Chicoine-Joubert, 2025 SCC 3	Feb 20, 2025	Feb 20, 2025	Bench; M	C–M	C–M	NS	C–M	C–M	D	NS	C–M
Saskatchewan (Environment) v. Métis Nation – Saskatchewan, 2025 SCC 4	Nov 6, 2024	Feb 28, 2025	C–U	C–U	C–U	U	C–U	C–U	C–U	C–U	C–U
Ontario (Attorney General) v. Working Families Coalition (Canada) Inc., 2025 SCC 5	May 21, 22, 2024	March 7, 2025	D 1	M	D 2	D 2	C–M	C–M	C–M	C–M	D 1
John Howard Society of Saskatchewan v. Saskatchewan (Attorney General), 2025 SCC 6	Oct 8, 9, 2024	Mar 14, 2025	M	C–M	D	C–D	C–M	C–M	C–D	C–M	C–M
R. v. R.A., 2025 SCC 7	Mar 20, 2025	Mar 20, 2025	Bench; U	C–U	C–U	C–U	C–U	C–U	C–U	C–U	C–U
R. v. P.B., 2025 SCC 8	Mar 21, 2025	Mar 21, 2025	NS	NS	NS	Bench; U	C–U	C–U	C–U	NS	C–U
R. v. Chizanga, 2025 SCC 9	Mar 24, 2025	Mar 24, 2025	NS	NS	NS	Bench; D Joint	M Joint	NS	M Joint	M Joint	D Joint
R. v. Donawa, 2025 SCC 10	Mar 26, 2025	Mar 26, 2025	NS	NS	NS	NS	Bench; U	C–U	C–U	C–U	C–U
Case name	Argued	Decided	Wagner	Karakatsanis	Côté	Rowe	Martin	Kasirer	Jamal	O'Bonsawin	Moreau
R. v. Kwon, 2025 SCC 11	Mar 27, 2025	Mar 27, 2025	NS	NS	NS	D	C–M	C–M	NS	C–M	Bench; M
R. v. Pan, 2025 SCC 12	Oct 17, 2024	Apr 10, 2025	M	D–P	C–M	C–M	C–DP	C–M	C–M	C–M	C–M
R. v. Underwood, 2025 SCC 14	Jan 21, 2025	Jan 21, 2025	NS	Bench; U	C–U	C–U	C–U	C–U	NS	C–U	C–U
Piekut v. Canada (National Revenue), 2025 SCC 13	Nov 5, 2024	Apr 17, 2025	C–M	D	C–M	C–M	C–D	C–M	M	C–M	C–D
Telus Communications Inc. v. Federation of Canadian Municipalities, 2025 SCC 15	Oct 16, 2024	Apr 25, 2025	C–M	C–M	D	C–M	C–D	C–M	C–M	C–M	M
R. v. J.W., 2025 SCC 16	Dec 3, 2024	May 23, 2025	C–U	C–U	C–U	U	C–U	C–U	C–U	C–U	C–U
Opsis Airport Services Inc. v. Quebec (Attorney General), 2025 SCC 17	Dec 11, 2024	May 30, 2025	C	C	C	C	C	C	C	C	C
R. v. Bouvette, 2025 SCC 18	Nov 14, 2024	Jun 6, 2025	C–M	C–C	C–M	C–M	C–R	M	C–M	C–C	C–C
R. v. Kinamore, 2025 SCC 19	Dec 5, 2024	Jun 13, 2025	U	C–U	C–U	C–U	C–U	C–U	C–U	C–U	C–U
Dunmore v. Mehralian, 2025 SCC 20	Dec 9, 2024	Jun 20, 2025	C–M	C–M	D	C–M	M	C–M	C–M	C–M	C–M
Case name	Argued	Decided	Wagner	Karakatsanis	Côté	Rowe	Martin	Kasirer	Jamal	O'Bonsawin	Moreau
Pepa v. Canada (Citizenship and Immigration), 2025 SCC 21	Dec 4, 2024	Jun 27, 2025	C–M	C–M	D Joint	D–P	M	C–M	C–M	D Joint	C–M
R. v. Varennes, 2025 SCC 22	Dec 6, 2024	Jul 11, 2025	NS	M	C–M	C–R	C–M	C–C	NS	C–M	C–M
R. v. I.M., 2025 SCC 23	Oct 15, 2024	Jul 18, 2025	C–M	C–M	D Joint	D Joint	C–M	M	C–M	C–M	C–M
R. v. S.B., 2025 SCC 24	Oct 15, 2024	Jul 18, 2025	C–M	C–M	C–R; Joint	C–R; Joint	C–M	M	C–M	C–M	C–M
R. v. Kloubakov, 2025 SCC 25	Nov 12, 13, 2024	Jul 24, 2025	C	C	C	C	C	C	C<	C	C
R. v. Bharwani, 2025 SCC 26	Jan 21, 2025	Jan 21, 2025	C–M	D Joint	C–M	C–M	D Joint	C–M	C–M	M	C–D
Sinclair v. Venezia Turismo, 2025 SCC 27	Nov 7, 2024	Jul 31, 2025	C–M	C–D	M	C–M	C–D	C–D	D	C–M	C–M
Kosicki v. Toronto (City), 2025 SCC 28	Jan 16, 2025	Sep 19, 2025	C–M	C–D	C–M	C–M	C–D	D	C–D	M	C–M
R. v. Sheppard, 2025 SCC 29	Apr 23, 2025	Sep 26, 2025	U	C–U	C–U	C–U	C–U	C–U	C–U	C–U	C–U
Mohawk Council of Kanesatake v. Sylvestre, 2025 SCC 30	Mar 19, 2025	Oct 10, 2025	C–U	C–U	C–U	C–U	C–U	U	C–U	C–U	C–U
Case name	Argued	Decided	Wagner	Karakatsanis	Côté	Rowe	Martin	Kasirer	Jamal	O'Bonsawin	Moreau
R. v. Di Paola, 2025 SCC 31	Jan 21, 2025	Jan 21, 2025	M	C–M	C–M	D	C–M	C–M	C–M	C–M	C–M
R. v. Wilson, 2025 SCC 32	Jan 14, 2025	Oct 24, 2025	C–M	M	C–D	C–D	C–M	C–M	D	C–M	C–M
Quebec (Attorney General) v. Senneville, 2025 SCC 33	Jan 29, 2025	Oct 31, 2025	D Joint	C–M	D Joint	C–D	C–M	C–M	C–M	C–D	M
R. v. Rioux, 2025 SCC 34	Jan 22, 2025	Nov 7, 2025	D Joint	C–M	D Joint	D Joint	M	C–M	C–M	C–M	D Joint
R. v. Rousselle, 2025 SCC 35	Apr 24, 2025	Nov 14, 2025	C–M	C–M	D	M Joint	C–M	C–M	C–M	C–M	M Joint
R. v. Larocque, 2025 SCC 36	Apr 24, 2025	Nov 14, 2025	C–M	C–M	D	M Joint	C–M	C–M	C–M	C–M	M Joint
R. v. W.W., 2025 SCC 37	Nov 14, 2025	Nov 14, 2025	U	U	U	U	U	Bench; U	U	U	U
Dorsey v. Canada (Attorney General), 2025 SCC 38	May 13, 2025	Nov 21, 2025	C–M	C–M	D Joint	D Joint	C–M	C–M	C–D	C–M	M
Lundin Mining Corp. v. Markowich, 2025 SCC 39	Jan 21, 2025	Jan 21, 2025	C–M	C–M	D	C–M	C–M	C–M	M	C–M	C–M
R. v. Ouellet, 2025 SCC 40	Jan 21, 2025	Jan 21, 2025	Bench; M	C–M	D	C–M	C–M	C–M	C–M	C–M	C–M
Case name	Argued	Decided	Wagner	Karakatsanis	Côté	Rowe	Martin	Kasirer	Jamal	O'Bonsawin	Moreau
R. v. B.F., 2025 SCC 41	May 22, 2025	Dec 5, 2025	C–DP	D–P; Joint	C–M	C–M	C–M	C–M	C–M	M	D–P; Joint
R. v. DeSutter, 2025 SCC 42	Dec 5, 2025	Dec 5, 2025	NS	NS	NS	Bench; D Joint	M Joint	M Joint	D Joint	M Joint	NS
R. v. Carignan, 2025 SCC 43	May 21, 2025	Dec 12, 2025	C–U	C–U	U	C–U	C–U	C–U	C–U	C–U	C–U
Sainte-Julie (City) v. Investissements Laroda inc., 2025 SCC 44	Feb 17, 2025	Dec 19, 2025	C–U	C–U	U	C–U	C–U	C–U	C–U	C–U	C–U

== Summaries ==
Summary of judgments 2025
Type	Number
By the Court	2
Unanimous	12
Majority with concurrences	3
Majority with dissents	24
Majority with dissents and dissenting in part	1
Majority with dissents in part	2
Total	44

Summary of Each Justice's Positions 2025
Decision Type	Wagner	Karakatsanis	Côté	Rowe	Martin	Kasirer	Jamal	O'Bonsawin	Moreau
Court	2	2	2	2	2	2	2	2	2
Unanimous	5	2	3	4	2	2	1	1	1
Unanimous (concurring)	5	9	8	8	11	10	11	11	11
Majority	6	3	1	2	5	4	3	5	6
Majority (concurring)	15	15	10	12	16	20	16	20	15
Concurring reasons	0	0	1	2	1	0	0	0	0
Concurred in concurrence	0	1	0	0	0	1	0	1	1
Dissent	3	2	13	8	1	2	5	1	3
Dissent (concurrence)	0	2	1	3	4	1	3	1	2
Dissenting in part	0	2	0	1	0	0	0	0	1
Dissenting in part (concurrence)	1	0	0	0	1	0	0	0	0
Not Sitting	7	6	5	2	1	2	3	2	2

Judgments issued, 2016 to 2025
Year	Judgments	Chief Justice
2025	44	Richard Wagner
2024	43	Wagner
2023	34	Wagner
2022	54	Wagner
2021	54	Wagner
2020	45	Wagner
2019	67	Wagner
2018	59	Wagner
2017	64	McLachlin
2016	56	McLachlin
Ten-year Average		52
Source: Supreme Court Judgments, 2016 to 2025

== See also ==
Lists of Supreme Court of Canada cases
