= R v Bissonnette =

Canadian legal decision

- Supreme Court of Canada

Hearing: March 24, 2022 Judgment: May 27, 2022
- Full case name: Her Majesty The Queen and Attorney General of Quebec v Alexandre Bissonnette
- Citations: 2022 SCC 23
- Docket No.: 39544
- Prior history: Judgment for the accused in the Court of Appeal for Quebec

Holding
- Section 745.51 of the Criminal Code violates Section 12 of the Canadian Charter of Rights and Freedoms and is of no force or effect

Court membership
- Chief Justice: Richard Wagner
- Puisne Justices: Michael Moldaver, Andromache Karakatsanis, Suzanne Côté, Russell Brown, Malcolm Rowe, Sheilah Martin, Nicholas Kasirer, Mahmud Jamal

Reasons given
- Unanimous reasons by: Wagner CJ

R v Bissonnette, 2022 SCC 23 is a landmark decision of the Supreme Court of Canada which held that life sentences without a realistic possibility of parole constituted cruel and unusual punishment. The Court unanimously struck down section 745.51 of the Criminal Code, which gave sentencing judges the discretion to stack periods of parole ineligibility for multiple murders, for violating Section 12 of the Canadian Charter of Rights and Freedoms.

The case arose in the sentencing for Quebec mosque shooter Alexandre Bissonnette and drew heavy media attention.

== Background ==
=== Life sentences in Canada ===
In Canada, life imprisonment exists as a criminal sentence for certain offences, and is mandatory for the offences of murder and high treason. An offender may apply for parole after serving a parole ineligibility period of 25 years for first-degree murder and high treason, and a judge-determined period between 10 and 25 years for second-degree murder. The mandatory sentences for murder have been upheld by the Supreme Court in R v Luxton and R v Latimer, for first and second degree murder respectively.

In 2011, Parliament passed the Protecting Canadians by Ending Sentence Discounts for Multiple Murders Act, the Act enacted section 745.51 of the Criminal Code, which gave sentencing judges the discretion to order that parole ineligibility periods for multiple murders be served consecutively. So if an offender was convicted of two first-degree murders, for example, the sentencing judge could order that the 25 year parole ineligibility periods for both murders be stacked for a combined ineligibility period of 50 years.

=== Section 12 of the Charter ===
Section 12 of Charter states:

Everyone has the right not to be subjected to any cruel and unusual treatment or punishment.

In section 12 jurisprudence, this guarantee has developed into a prohibition against two classes of punishment. Firstly, certain types of extreme punishments that are always incompatible with human dignity, such as corporal punishment, torture, or castration. And secondly, those types of punishments that are not in of themselves incompatible with human dignity, but nonetheless can become cruel and unusual if their duration or extent is grossly disproportionate to the appropriate sentence, having regard to the seriousness of the offence and offender's degree of responsibility. The latter prong of section 12 is used to challenge mandatory minimums, but the Supreme Court has upheld the mandatory sentences for murder.

=== Factual background ===
On the evening of January 29, 2017, 27-year-old Alexandre Bissonnette entered the prayer hall at the Islamic Cultural Centre of Quebec City, a mosque in the Sainte-Foy neighbourhood of Quebec City and opened fire for about two minutes with a 9mm Glock pistol. Six worshippers were killed and five others seriously injured in one of the worst mass shootings in Canadian history. He turned himself in by calling 911 approximately 20 minutes later, after initially fleeing the scene in a car. Bissonnette would plead guilty to six counts of first degree murder, and six counts of attempted murder. The case was highly publicized and sparked a conversation on Islamophobia in Quebec and Canadian society.

== In lower courts ==
At trial, the Crown asked for all the murder sentences to be served consecutively pursuant to section 745.51 of the Criminal Code, for a total parole ineligibility period of 150 years. Bissonnette, for his part, brought a constitutional challenge to sec. 745.51, under section 12 of the Charter. The trial judge held that while Bissonnette's crimes were serious, a 150-year parole ineligibility period was far too excessive. He held that an appropriate parole ineligibility period for the offender in the case would be between 35 and 42 years, but noted that the provision restricted him to at least 50 years of ineligibility if he were to order any of the sentences to run consecutively.

Ultimately the trial judge held that the gravity of Bissonnette's offence necessitated a sentence greater than the baseline 25 years of ineligibility, but that the 50-year period would be grossly disproportionate as applied to him, and thus constitute cruel and unusual punishment. After finding the provision to be unconstitutional, he turned to question of remedy, holding that sentencing discretion could be read into the provision as an appropriate remedy. He then sentenced Bissonnette to life in prison with no parole eligibility for 40 years.

Both the Crown and Bissonnette appealed to the Quebec Court of Appeal, which ultimately granted Bissonnette's appeal and rejected the Crown's. The Court agreed with the trial judge that the provision was unconstitutional, but held that reading in discretion was too intrusive of a remedy and that he should have instead struck the provision down. It in turn reduced Bissonnette's sentence to one of life imprisonment with no parole eligibility for 25 years.

== Judgment ==
Chief justice Richard Wagner, writing for a unanimous court, rejected the Crown's appeal and held section 745.51 to be unconstitutional. He began his reasons by recounting the two prongs of section 12, one which protects against grossly disproportionate punishment, and the other that forecloses that narrow class of punishments that are so intrinsically at odds with human dignity that they can never be imposed. He held that a punishment that is caught by the latter prong will always necessarily be grossly disproportionate, so it is not necessary to analyze it in terms of gross disproportionality after such a finding is made. He also held that even though sentencing judges have discretion to not stack parole ineligibility periods under section 745.51, the mere fact that it authorizes such a punishment will be enough to render the section unconstitutional, should a finding be made that the power can be exercised in a manner that engages the latter prong.

The Court held that a life sentence that deprives an offender from the onset of any realistic possibility of release falls within the narrow class of punishments that can never be imposed under the Charter. The Court held that such a punishment is intrinsically at odds with human dignity because it pre-supposes that an offender is beyond redemption and lacks the moral autonomy to rehabilitate themselves. Wagner CJ emphasized that while it was open to Parliament to deprioritize the sentencing objective of rehabilitation compared to other sentencing objectives for certain offences, what it could not to do was eradicate it completely. The door to rehabilitation must always remain open, even where it is of minimal importance relative to other sentencing objectives. The Court also noted that Parliament had already deprioritized rehabilitation to other sentencing objectives for first degree murder by a setting a parole ineligibility period of 25 years, which though constitutional was also longer than many of Canada's counterparts in the developed world.

The Court also emphasized the psychological effects of such a sentence, holding that offenders deprived of any opportunity of release have no incentive to improve themselves and live a futile existence. It noted the crushing psychological effect of being isolated from loved ones and the outside world, while knowing that nothing you could ever do would let you break that isolation. The Court also noted how many offenders faced with such a predicament wish to end their own lives to break the apparently endless suffering. The Court held that these effects further support the conclusion that a sentence of life imprisonment without the possibility of parole is fundamentally incompatible with human dignity.

== Reception ==
Leaders in Quebec's Muslim community expressed disappointment with the decision. The National Council of Canadian Muslims said that the decision would reopen wounds for the attack's survivors and families of the victims. Justice minister David Lametti said that while the government had supported the law, they would respect the ruling and review its implications, while also acknowledging the hurt and anger rekindled by the decision. The opposition Conservative party immediately called on the government to explore legislative options in response to the ruling. The NDP concurred, saying while they respected the ruling, the government still had the responsibility to explore its options. Former Conservative prime minister Stephen Harper, under whose government the law was enacted, expressed his disappointment with the ruling. Pierre Poilievre, the front-runner in the 2022 Conservative leadership election, said that he would invoke the notwithstanding clause to override the decision. Had that happened, it would have been the first time in Canadian history that the clause was invoked by the federal parliament.

The decision was also criticized by some media editorials as devaluing the lives of the victims, and as judicial activism, while others defended it as a just limitation on the retributive power of the state. Families of victims in other cases where the stacking provision had already been used or was expected to be used also sharply criticized the decision.

== See also ==
- 2022 reasons of the Supreme Court of Canada
- Legal challenges to whole life orders in England and Wales
