= Ahluwalia v. Ahluwalia =

Supreme Court of Canada tort case

- Supreme Court of Canada

Hearing: February 11, 12, 2025 Judgment: May 15, 2026
- Full case name: Kuldeep Kaur Ahluwalia (Appellant) and Amrit Pal Singh Ahluwalia (Respondent) and Attorney General of Canada, Attorney General of British Columbia, Raoul Wallenberg Centre for Human Rights, South Asian Legal Clinic of Ontario, South Asian Legal Clinic of British Columbia, South Asian Bar Association, DisAbled Women’s Network of Canada, Provincial Association of Transition Houses and Services of Saskatchewan, Women’s Legal Education and Action Fund Inc., Barbra Schlifer Commemorative Clinic, Registered Nurses’ Association of Ontario, Justice for Children and Youth, Luke’s Place Support and Resource Centre for Women and Children, Action ontarienne contre la violence faite aux femmes, Sandgate Women’s Shelter of York Region, National Association of Women and the Law, West Coast Legal Education and Action Fund Association, Rise Women’s Legal Centre, Battered Women’s Support Services Association and Tort Law and Social Equality Project (Interveners)
- Citations: 2026 SCC 16
- Prior history: Appeal from the Court of Appeal for Ontario
- Ruling: Common law tort of intimate partner violence recognised

Court membership
- Chief Justice: Richard Wagner; Puisne Justices: Andromache Karakatsanis, Suzanne Côté, Malcolm Rowe, Sheilah Martin, Nicholas Kasirer, Mahmud Jamal, Michelle O'Bonsawin, Mary Moreau

Reasons given
- Majority: Kasirer (Wagner, Martin, O’Bonsawin and Moreau, concurring)
- Concurrence: Karakatsanis
- Dissent: Jamal (Côté and Rowe, concurring)

Ahluwalia v. Ahluwalia is a landmark decision of the Supreme Court of Canada which established a common law tort of intimate partner violence.

== Facts ==
Kuldeep Ahluwalia and Amrit Ahluwalia were married in India in 1999 and immigrated to Canada in 2001. They had two children. The couple separated in 2016. In court proceedings in the Ontario Superior Court of Justice, Ms Ahluwalia requested extensive damages for physical, mental and emotional abuse from Mr Ahluwalia over the course of the marriage.

== Decisions of the Ontario courts ==
In 2022, after an eleven day trial, the Superior Court ruled in favour of Ms Ahluwalia. The trial judge found that Mr Ahluwalia had engaged in serious physical assaults on Ms Ahluwalia during the course of the marriage, and that there was an overall pattern of coercive and controlling behaviour on his part. The trial judge also concluded that existing torts, such as assault, battery, or intentional infliction of emotional distress did not adequately cover the overall pattern of behaviour and the cumulative harm. The trial judge found that there was a tort of intimate family violence, that Mr Ahluwalia was liable, and assessed damages of $150,000.

On appeal, the Ontario Court of Appeal disagreed with the creation of the new tort of intimate family violence, ruling that existing torts were adequate to cover the harms suffered by Ms Ahluwalia. The Court of Appeal reduced the damages award to $100,000.

== Supreme Court of Canada ==
Ms Ahluwalia appealed to the Supreme Court of Canada, which heard the appeal over two days, February 11 and 12, 2025. In addition to the two parties, there were seventeen interveners, including the Attorney General of Canada, the Attorney General of British Columbia and numerous family violence support agencies. The Court reserved judgment.

The Supreme Court gave its decision on May 15, 2026. By a 6-3 decision, the Court allowed the appeal and held that there was a tort of intimate partner violence.

Justice Kasirer wrote the majority decision for himself and four other judges, recognising the tort of intimate partner violence. He disagreed with the trial judge's framing of the new tort as intimate family violence, as it was not supported by the facts and in his view was too broad. He restricted the tort to the relationship between the intimate partners, not the family as a whole.

Justice Karakatsanis concurred in the decision, and agreed with the new tort of intimate partner violence, but would have expanded one of the elements of the tort beyond that set by the majority.

Justice Jamal dissented, with two other judges concurring. He would have held that the existing common law torts were sufficient to deal with the issue of intimate partner violence and there was no need for the court to create a new tort.
