= R v Brown (2022) =

Canadian legal decision

- Supreme Court of Canada

Hearing: November 9, 2021 Judgment: May 13, 2022
- Full case name: Matthew Winston Brown v. Her Majesty The Queen
- Citations: 2022 SCC 18
- Docket No.: 39781
- Prior history: Judgment for Crown in the Court of Appeal for Alberta

Holding
- Section 33.1 of the Criminal Code violates section 7 and section 11(d) of the Canadian Charter of Rights and Freedoms and cannot be saved under section 1

Court membership
- Chief Justice: Richard Wagner
- Puisne Justices: Michael Moldaver, Andromache Karakatsanis, Suzanne Côté, Russell Brown, Malcolm Rowe, Sheilah Martin, Nicholas Kasirer, Mahmud Jamal

Reasons given
- Unanimous reasons by: Kasirer J

R v Brown, 2022 SCC 18, is a decision of the Supreme Court of Canada on the constitutionality of section 33.1 of the Criminal Code, which prohibited an accused from raising self-induced intoxication as a defence to criminal charges. The Court unanimously held that the section violated the Charter of Rights and Freedoms and struck it down as unconstitutional. The Court delivered the Brown decision alongside the decision for its companion case R v Sullivan.

The case was a successor to the Court's controversial 1994 landmark decision in R v Daviault, which held the common law "Leary rule", which restricts intoxication from being used as a defence, while constitutional to the extent it relates to normal forms of intoxication, could not be justified as it related to extreme forms of intoxication akin to automatism. The case had sparked outcry, which served as a catalyst for Parliament enacting section 33.1. Parliament would likewise respond to the Brown ruling, this time by amending section 33.1.

== Background ==
Matthew Brown, a 26-year-old student of Mount Royal University, consumed six or seven mixed drinks, a few beers, and less than one-and-a-half grams of magic mushrooms while at a party in Calgary. Magic mushrooms contain psilocybin, an illegal hallucinogenic. He had used magic mushrooms before and had described them as giving a "fuzzy but positive feeling". Brown would go on to describe at trial how he started feeling "wonky" at around 1:30 AM the following day, and began losing his grip on reality.

Brown eventually removed his clothing and left the house at around 3:45 AM in an agitated state, running naked in bare feet through the cold winter night. Brown's friends searched for him for ten to fifteen minutes before calling the police. Around 4 AM, professor Janet Hamnett was woken up by what sounded like an "explosion". As she went to investigate the break-in, she was attacked by Brown. He knocked her to the ground and began beating her with a broken broom handle. Eventually she managed to escape to the bathroom, where she locked herself in, while Brown ran out to the street. When she thought he was gone, she ran to the neighbour's house and began banging on the door. The neighbour found Hamnett covered in blood, with a towel wrapped around her hands to shield serious hand injuries, and called the police.

Around 5 AM, Brown broke into another residence a kilometre away. The couple who owned the house barricaded themselves in the bedroom and called the police. The police arrived to find a bruised Brown lying naked on the floor of the bathroom. He complied with police instructions and was taken to a hospital to receive medical care, and then to jail. Brown had no memory of either incident.

At trial Brown tried to argue he was innocent because he lacked the requisite mens rea for the crime since he was in a state of automatism as a result of ingesting the magic mushrooms. Expert evidence adduced at the trial confirmed that he was indeed in a state of delirium at the time of the offences, and that a reaction from ingesting the mushrooms was the clear causative factor for the episode. In response to his submissions, the Crown invoked section 33.1 of the criminal code to preempt the defence. Section 33.1 stated:

- (1) It is not a defence to an offence referred to in subsection (3) that the accused, by reason of self-induced intoxication, lacked the general intent or the voluntariness required to commit the offence, where the accused departed markedly from the standard of care as described in subsection (2).
- (2) For the purposes of this section, a person departs markedly from the standard of reasonable care generally recognized in Canadian society and is thereby criminally at fault where the person, while in a state of self-induced intoxication that renders the person unaware of, or incapable of consciously controlling, their behaviour, voluntarily or involuntarily interferes or threatens to interfere with the bodily integrity of another person.
- (3) This section applies in respect of an offence under this Act or any other Act of Parliament that includes as an element an assault or any other interference or threat of interference by a person with the bodily integrity of another person.

In response, Brown brought a constitutional challenge to the provision. The Supreme Court had partially invalided (for extreme intoxication akin to automatism) a similar common law rule (the Leary rule) in R v Daviault, and it was in fact the backlash to Daviault which had even spurred Parliament to enact section 33.1. Judge Willie Dewit for the Alberta Court of Queen's Bench struck down the provision. Judge Michele Hollins subsequently entered an acquittal, finding that Brown had indeed been in a state of automatism.

The Alberta Court of Appeal reversed Dewit's decision and declared section 33.1 to be constitutional, also setting aide's Brown's acquittal. The three judges on the Court all wrote separate opinions upholding the provision. The judges distinguished the present case before them from Daviault by pointing out the common law root of the restriction in Daviault vs the statutory roots of section 33.1. Judge Frans Slatter wrote that the Court in Daviault did not foreclose Parliament from enacting legislation to close the legislative "gap" which allowed some offenders to avoid criminal liability if they were extremely intoxicated, holding that section 33.1 criminalized the ingestion of dangerous substances that could trigger automatism. In contrast, Daviault dealt with a common law rule that restricted a defence. Justice Beth Hughes wrote that section 33.1 was different from the Leary rule because it had a fault requirement, citing the section's declarations on the standard of reasonable care recognized in Canadian society and what constituted a marked departure from it. Justice Ritu Khullar found breaches of the Charter but upheld the section anyway, holding that those infringements could be justified under section 1 of the Charter. Distinguishing the case from Daviault, where the court held that the infringements could not be justified for intoxication akin to automatism, she placed emphasis on the common law origin of the Leary rule. She noted that Parliament had examined evidence on the damage and risk of allowing such a defence after Daviault and had made a "defensible" choice in taking away the defence again.

== Judgment ==
Justice Nicholas Kasirer wrote for a unanimous Supreme Court, holding that section 33.1 of the criminal code violated sections 11(d) and 7 of the Charter and could not be saved under section 1. Accordingly, he struck down 33.1 for being unconstitutional, declaring it to be of no force or effect.

Kasirer J started his opinion by distinguishing the automatism-like intoxication at issue from typical forms of intoxication, citing that the Court in Daviault had upheld the Leary rule as it related to typical forms of intoxication. He also acknowledged Parliament's pressing objective in holding people who engage in crimes of violence while intoxicated accountable, noting how intoxication-linked violence disproportionately affects women and children and undermines social equality. Finally, he stressed that neither the Court's decision in Daviault or its decision now in Brown meant that people who commit crimes while under a state of extreme intoxication had to remain out of the reach of criminal law, holding that there were constitutionally sound mechanisms through which Parliament could achieve its goal of holding those people accountable. He then started expounding on why the particular mechanism Parliament had chosen was unconstitutional.

Kasirer J explained that section 33.1 did not create a new offence, instead it eliminated a defence for certain existing general intent offences. He also found that section 33.1 did not contain a fault (mens rea) requirement, because under the section a marked departure automatically existed when a violent offence was committed under a state of extreme intoxication, with no regard for whether the resulting state of automatism was reasonably foreseeable. The Court has long recognized that it is a principle of fundamental justice under Section 7 of the Charter that criminal offences require a minimum fault requirement, which is at least negligence. He reasoned that while section 33.1 appeared to have this fault requirement based on the language of "marked departure" used, it actually was just a provision assigning liability in certain situations under the pretext of a fault requirement. Essentially, parliament was substituting the intent to get intoxicated with mens rea for the general intent offences covered by the section. He accordingly held that section 33.1 violated section 7 of the Charter because it allowed for the deprivation of liberty contrary to a principle of fundamental justice, namely that all criminal offences require a minimum mens rea requirement of at least negligence.

Kasirer J further held that the provision similarly violated section 11(d) of the Charter, which guarantees the presumption of innocence. He noted that the presumption of innocence requires the crown to establish all essential elements of an offence. Based on the Court's prior jurisprudence, when Parliament declares that proof of one fact is presumed to satisfy proof of one of the essential elements of an offence, a breach of section 11(d) will be established unless the proving of that fact inexorably leads to the conclusion that the essential element must've also been met. Under 33.1 proving that the accused had the intent to consume the substance could be substituted for intent to commit the predicate offences, and the inexorable connection exception could not apply, and accordingly a violation of section 11(d) was also established.

The Court then turned to the question of whether the Charter breaches could be justified under section 1, which allows for "reasonable limits" on Charter rights. Kasirer J recounted the Oakes test, which determines whether a limit of a Charter right is reasonable. In order to surmount the Oakes test, the limit must be imposed for a substantial and pressing objective, it must be rationally connected to that objective, it must impair the Charter rights as minimally as possible to achieve that objective, and the benefits from the limit must outweigh its negative effects. Section 33.1, Kasirer reasoned, failed at both the minimal impairment and final balancing stage of the test.

He first acknowledged that Parliament's objectives of holding people who commit violent offences while in a state of extreme intoxication accountable, and protecting victims of intoxication-linked violence were substantial and pressing. He also found that withholding the defence of automatism for the enumerated crimes was rationally connected to the section's purpose. However, it failed the minimal impairment test because Parliament had several less intrusive alternatives to achieve its objectives. First, it could have created a stand-alone offence of ingesting dangerous substances, this would not violate section 7 or 11(d) while also protecting the public by deterring individuals from ingesting substances that could pose a danger to public safety by triggering a state akin to automatism. Second, Parliament could have enacted a similar provision with an actual negligence fault requirement. Under such a provision the Crown would have to prove that the automatism and resulting violence was reasonably foreseeable to the accused when they ingested the substance. Finally, the court held, the salutary effects of the provision were outweighed by its deleterious effects. Kasirer noted that the provision seriously trampled on basic norms of the criminal justice system designed to protect the innocent. It had no regard for the voluntariness of the accused's conduct, it had no criterion for objective foreseeability, so people could theoretically be charged for unforeseeable automatism that results from legal or prescribed substances, and by substituting intent to get intoxicated with the intent to commit the predicate offence, it could lead to disproportionate punishments that don't reflect the accused's moral blameworthiness.

== Reception ==
The decision drew criticism. Hamnett expressed her disappointment at the result of the case, writing that she was also afraid for future victims. Attorney General and Justice Minister David Lametti immediately announced that the Department of Justice was reviewing its options, while also stressing the decision only covered cases of intoxication akin to automatism and did not apply to the vast majority of cases related to intoxication-linked violence. Elizabeth Sheehy, Isabel Grant, and Kerri A. Froc, all law professors, wrote an article for the Toronto Star decrying the ruling as a setback for women and calling on the Trudeau government to revise the law to limit its damage. Kat Owens, project director at the Women's Legal Education and Action Fund, said she was relieved that the Court had set a high bar for the defence and clarified that normal cases of intoxication would not suffice.

The ruling received a more sympathetic reception from Dennis Baker, associate professor of political science, and columnist Colby Cosh. They wrote articles for the Toronto Star and National Post, respectively, on the ruling. Baker said a new, more carefully tailored, law could be in everyone's interest if properly drafted. And Cosh noted the "sacred and ancient" role of the requirement for mens rea in Canada's justice system. The decision was also defended by some lawyers.

Protests were held throughout the country over the ruling.

== Aftermath ==
On June 17, a month after the decision, Lametti tabled a bill in House of Commons to respond to the ruling. The bill would follow one of the alternatives mentioned by the Supreme Court in its ruling, and amend section 33.1 to provide for a real fault requirement, namely negligence. The Crown would need to prove that the accused acted negligently in consuming the intoxicating substance as an essential element of an offence covered by the section, having regard to the objective foreseeability of risk that comes with its ingestion, among other factors. The bill passed through the House on June 22, after MPs unanimously agreed to expedite it, and the Senate followed on June 23. The bill received royal assent and became law on the same day.

Section 33.1 now reads as follows:

- (1) A person who, by reason of self-induced extreme intoxication, lacks the general intent or voluntariness ordinarily required to commit an offence referred to in subsection (3), nonetheless commits the offence if
  - (a) all the other elements of the offence are present; and
  - (b) before they were in a state of extreme intoxication, they departed markedly from the standard of care expected of a reasonable person in the circumstances with respect to the consumption of intoxicating substances.
- (2) For the purposes of determining whether the person departed markedly from the standard of care, the court must consider the objective foreseeability of the risk that the consumption of the intoxicating substances could cause extreme intoxication and lead the person to harm another person. The court must, in making the determination, also consider all relevant circumstances, including anything that the person did to avoid the risk.
- (3) This section applies in respect of an offence under this Act or any other Act of Parliament that includes as an element an assault or any other interference or threat of interference by a person with the bodily integrity of another person.
- (4) In this section, extreme intoxication means intoxication that renders a person unaware of, or incapable of consciously controlling, their behaviour.

== See also ==
- 2022 reasons of the Supreme Court of Canada
