= R v Stairs =

Canadian legal decision

- Supreme Court of Canada

Hearing: November 2, 2021 Judgment: April 8, 2022
- Full case name: Matthew Stairs v Her Majesty The Queen
- Citations: 2022 SCC 11
- Docket No.: 39416
- Prior history: Judgment for Crown in the Court of Appeal for Ontario

Holding
- The common law Search Incident to Arrest rule needs to be modified as it relates to searches of the home to be Charter-compliant. A search incident to arrest of an area of the home not within the physical control of the accused at the time of the arrest will only be valid at common law if: 1. The police officer conducting it reasonably suspects that there is a risk to public safety that will be addressed by the search, and; 2. The search is carefully tailored to address that risk.

Court membership
- Chief Justice: Richard Wagner
- Puisne Justices: Michael Moldaver, Andromache Karakatsanis, Suzanne Côté, Russell Brown, Malcolm Rowe, Sheilah Martin, Nicholas Kasirer, Mahmud Jamal

Reasons given
- Majority: Moldaver and Jamal J, joined by Wagner CJ, and Rowe and Kasirer JJ
- Concurrence: Côté J
- Dissent: Karakatsanis J, joined by Brown and Martin JJ

R v Stairs, 2022 SCC 11 is a constitutional rights decision of the Supreme Court of Canada. The Court established new standards for searches of a person's home after they have been arrested. At issue in the case was whether the traditional common law power of Search Incident to Arrest, which allows police officers to engage in warrantless searches of lawfully arrested persons, was compliant with section 8 of the Charter of Rights and Freedoms as it related to searches of the home.

All justices agreed that the traditional standard was not compliant with section 8, and needed to be modified as it related to searches of the home to be constitutional. But the majority and minority split 5–4 on how stringent the new modified standard should be, with the majority opting for one less stringent than what the minority proposed.

== Background ==
=== Section 8 ===
Section 8 of the Canadian Charter of Rights and Freedoms declares:

Everyone has the right to be secure against unreasonable search or seizure

The purpose of section 8 is to prevent unjustified searches before they occur. A search will be reasonable under section 8 if it is 1) authorized by law, 2) the law itself is reasonable, and 3) the search was conducted in a reasonable manner. A reasonable law under section 8 is one which properly balances the privacy interests of the person with the law enforcement objectives of the state.

One authority that allows searches is the common law Search Incident to Arrest (SITA) rule. The rule allows an officer to search and seize anything from a lawfully arrested person if such action would advance the objectives of the arrest, including the discovery of evidence, prevention of escape, or ensuring the safety of the officer or the arrested person. The SITA rule is exceptional among section 8 compliant laws in that it allows the search of an individual on a standard lower than reasonable and probable grounds, and because it does not require prior judicial authorization (a warrant). The SITA rule is reasonable, not because arrested people have a reduced expectation of privacy, but because the "need for the law enforcement authorities to gain control of things or information which outweighs the individual’s interest in privacy".

There have been several cases, however, where the SITA rule has been held unreasonable as it relates to some types of searches. This occurs due to the heightened privacy interests of the accused, which renders the balance struck by the SITA rule disproportionate. These cases include the taking of bodily samples (R v Stillman), strip searches (R v Golden), penile swabs (R v Saeed), and searches of the phone (R v Fearon). In each of these cases the Court modified the search incident to arrest rule to be constitutionally complaint, with differing levels of burden imposed on the state to justify the search based on the privacy interests implicated by each type of search.

The Court has also repeatedly recognized the sanctity of the home, based on the principle that it as an individual's "castle", and the unique privacy interests it implicates. In its landmark decision in R v Feeney, the Court held that warrantless entry into the home was not permitted except under exigent circumstances.

=== Factual background ===
A witness called 911 to report seeing a male driver repeatedly strike a female passenger in his vehicle. Police officers were able to track the car to a driveway of a house. They knocked on the front door, while loudly announcing their presence, but no one answered. The officers, fearing for the woman's safety, forced their way in. They saw a woman with fresh wounds to her face run up from the stairs to the basement. They then observed Matthew Stairs run past the bottom of the staircase. Stairs would barricade himself in the basement laundry room, and then be arrested shortly. After his arrest, the police conduced a visual clearance search of the basement living room area, during which they found a plastic bag containing methamphetamine in clear view. The accused was charged with possession of a controlled substance for the purpose of trafficking, assault, and breach of probation.

=== In lower courts ===
At the Superior Court of Justice, Stairs brought an application under section 24(2) of the Charter to have the evidence of the methamphetamine excluded from the trial, arguing that it was obtained in a manner that violated his section 8 rights against unreasonable search and seizure. The trial judge dismissed the application, finding that there had been no breach of section 8. Noting that he had been lawfully arrested (the police could enter the house without a warrant because of exigent circumstances), and that the search was done to advance the objectives of the arrest. He was convicted on all charges.

Stairs appealed to the Court of Appeal for Ontario, arguing that the judge should not have applied the SITA rule. A split Court upheld his conviction by a 2-1 margin. Justice Michal Fairburn, writing for the majority, held that the traditional SITA framework applied, and that it was constitutional as applied to searches of the home and therefore it did not need to be modified. Justice Ian Nordheimer dissented, stating that the home could only be searched incident to arrest if there were reasonable and probable grounds to believe there was an imminent risk to public safety.

== Holding ==
Justices Micheal Moldaver and Mahmud Jamal wrote for the five justice majority. The Court held that the SITA rule authorizes police officers to search an area sufficiently proximate to an arrest, the scope of which varies by context and which may encompass a home. They further held that a modified version of the framework was necessary for some of those searches. In its new framework, the Court bifurcated these searches into two categories. First, searches incident to arrest of an area of the home under the physical control of the accused at the time of the arrest would continue to be subject to the old SITA framework. However, in order to search an area of the home not under the physical control of the accused at the time of the arrest, officers must meet two conditions. Namely, the officers must 1) have a reasonable suspicion that there is a safety risk to the accused, officers, or the general public that would be addressed by the search, and 2) narrowly tailor the search towards addressing that suspicion, so that the search is no more intrusive than necessary to satisfy the safety risk.

Applying the test to the facts of the case, the Court held that there had been no breach of Stairs' rights. It was conceded that the home was sufficiently proximate to the arrest to enable its search under the SITA authority, and that the basement living room had not been under the physical control of Stairs at the time of the arrest. The Court held that even though the living room search engaged the heightened threshold, the officers had nonetheless met the two conditions for such searches. Because the officers reasonably suspected that there was a safety risk which could be addressed by the search, and because the search was narrowly tailored to address that concern. With the risk being that there were other victims in the house that needed attention, and the officers having tailored their response by only performing a visual clearance search. The justices noted that the only reason the search discovered methamphetamine was because it was in plain view.

== Dissent and concurrence ==
Justice Andromache Karakatsanis wrote a dissent, which was joined by two other justices. Karakatsanis J agreed with the majority that the current SITA framework needed to be modified in order to be constitutional insofar it relates to searches of the home, however she held that the majority's framework was still not stringent enough to reflect the high degree of privacy interests implicated by searches of the home. Under the dissent's framework, searches of the home incident to arrest would only be valid if the police reasonably suspected that there was an imminent risk to public safety which required the search, and the search was narrowly tailored to address that suspicion. Karakatsanis J stated that the requirement for imminence was necessary to delineate the situations in which getting a warrant was feasible from those that required an urgent response. She also rejected the distinction in the majority's opinion between spaces that were under the physical control of accused and those that were not, saying that it was unnecessary and overcomplicated the framework. Applying her framework to the facts of the case, Karakatsanis J found the search unlawful, and said the evidence should've been excluded based on the seriousness of the state conduct and its impact on the accused's privacy interests.

Justice Suzanne Côté wrote a concurrence in which she endorsed the dissent's framework. She agreed that the basement living room search had been unlawful and breached Stairs' section 8 right against unreasonable search and seizure, but would've still admitted the derivative evidence based on the Grant test. Côté J held that since the officers had been operating in good faith on what they reasonably assumed to be the correct law for such searches, the Grant factors favoured admission of the evidence in the particular circumstances of the case.

== See also ==
- 2022 reasons of the Supreme Court of Canada
