= Peace River Hydro Partners v Petrowest Corp =

- Supreme Court of Canada

Hearing: 19 January 2022 Judgment: 10 November 2022
- Full case name: Peace River Hydro Partners, Acciona Infrastructure Canada Inc, Samsung C&T Canada Ltd, Acciona Infraestructuras SA and Samsung C&T Corporation v Petrowest Corporation, Petrowest Civil Services LP by its general partner, Petrowest GP Ltd, carrying on business as RBEE Crushing, Petrowest Construction LP by its general partner Petrowest GP Ltd, carrying on business as Quigley Contracting, Petrowest Services Rentals LP by its general partner Petrowest GP Ltd, carrying on business as Nu-Northern Tractor Rentals, Petrowest GP Ltd, as general partner of Petrowest Civil Services LP, Petrowest Construction LP and Petrowest Services Rentals LP, Trans Carrier Ltd and Ernst & Young Inc in its capacity as court-appointed receiver and manager of Petrowest Corporation, Petrowest Civil Services LP, Petrowest Construction LP, Petrowest Services Rentals LP, Petrowest GP Ltd and Trans Carrier Ltd
- Citations: 2022 SCC 41
- Docket No.: 39547
- Prior history: APPEAL from Petrowest Corporation v. Peace River Hydro Partners, 2020 BCCA 339, 43 BCLR (6th) 8 (30 November 2020), affirming Petrowest Corporation v Peace River Hydro Partners, 2019 BCSC 2221 (20 December 2019). Leave to appeal granted, Peace River Hydro Partners, et al v Petrowest Corporation, et al, 2021 CanLII 49685 (10 June 2021)
- Ruling: Appeal dismissed

Holding
- The Arbitration Agreements are inoperative. The multiple arbitral processes contemplated in them would compromise the orderly and efficient resolution of the receivership, contrary to the objectives of the BIA.

Court membership
- Chief Justice: Richard Wagner; Puisne Justices: Michael Moldaver, Andromache Karakatsanis, Suzanne Côté, Russell Brown, Malcolm Rowe, Sheilah Martin, Nicholas Kasirer, Mahmud Jamal

Reasons given
- Majority: Côté J, joined by Wagner CJ and Moldaver, Rowe and Kasirer JJ
- Concurrence: Jamal J, joined by Karakatsanis, Brown and Martin JJ

Laws applied
- Bankruptcy and Insolvency Act; Arbitration Act (BC) (Note: Arbitration Act, RSBC 1996, c. 55 , since replaced by the Arbitration Act, SBC 2020, c. 2)

Peace River Hydro Partners v Petrowest Corp, 2022 SCC 41 (10 November 2022) is a case of the Supreme Court of Canada on the applicability of arbitration laws on the authority of a receiver appointed under the Bankruptcy and Insolvency Act.

== Background ==
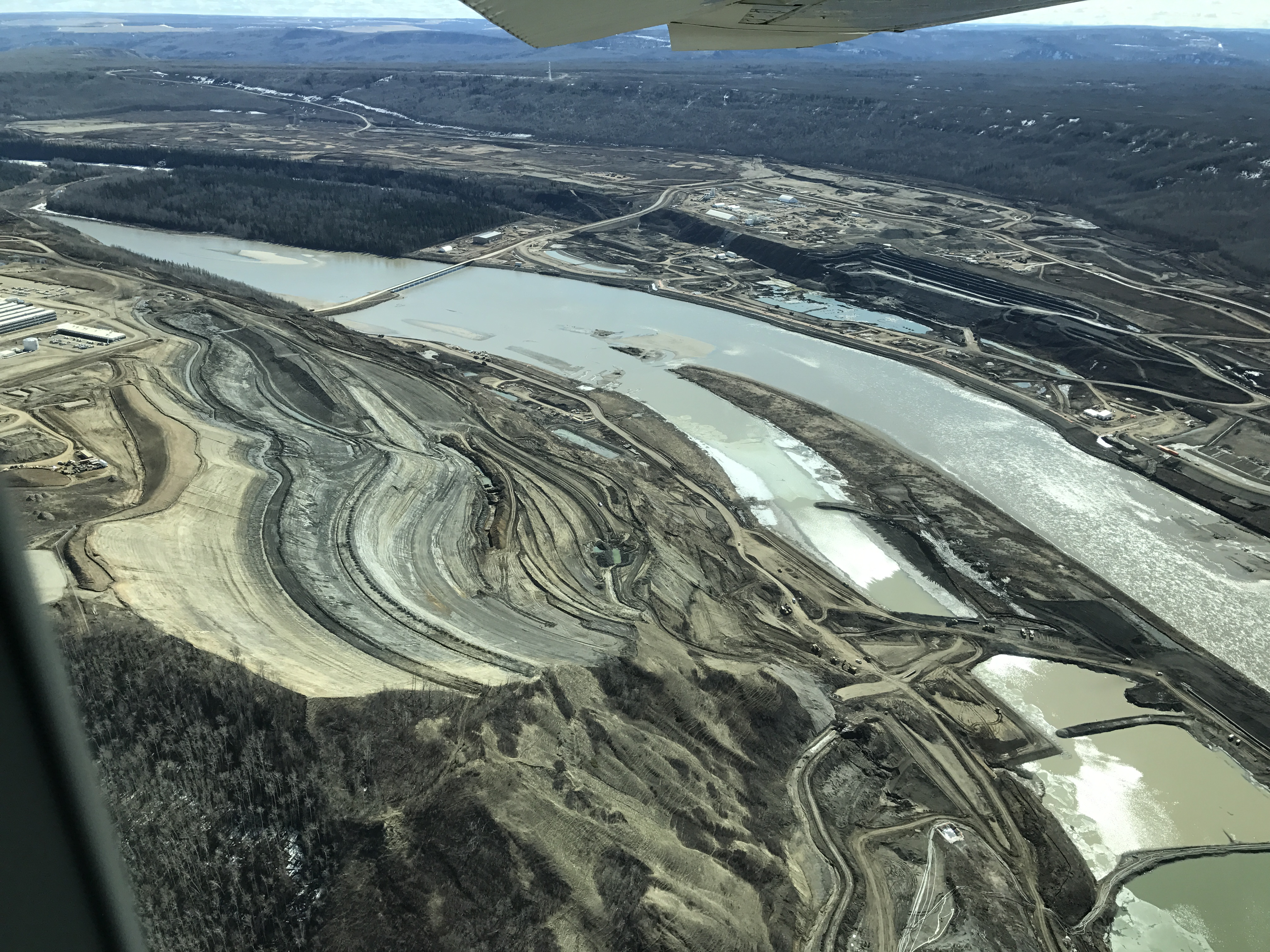
Site C dam site, looking downstream

Petrowest Corporation, together with Acciona and Samsung, formed Peace River Hydro Partners in 2015 as a partnership to perform work for BC Hydro on its Site C project site in northeastern British Columbia. At the time, Petrowest was reported to be experiencing difficulties in meeting its debt covenants. In 2017, Petrowest was ousted from the partnership, and its lenders subsequently obtained permission from the Court of Queen's Bench of Alberta to place it and all its affiliates into receivership. Ernst & Young was appointed as Receiver, (Note: under the Bankruptcy and Insolvency Act, R.S.C. 1985, c. B-3, s. 243(1)) and it also became the trustee in bankruptcy of the affiliates in 2018.

The Receiver sued PRHP in the Supreme Court of British Columbia for amounts allegedly owed under the partnership agreement (together with connected purchase orders and subcontracting agreement), as well as pursuing Acciona and Samsung for amounts said to be owed under related guarantee and cross-indemnity agreements. The defendants argued that the agreements contained clauses that required disputes to be submitted to arbitration, while the plaintiffs stated that, as a court-appointed officer, the Receiver was not bound by the debtor's contracts, and could seek the direction of the court in order to achieve the objectives of the Bankruptcy and Insolvency Act.

== The courts below ==
At the BC Supreme Court, Iyer J held that the province's Arbitration Act was engaged in the current case, but current insolvency jurisprudence stated that the Bankruptcy and Insolvency Act allowed the court to exercise its "inherent jurisdiction to control its own processes in order to promote the objectives of the BIA". Accordingly, the BC Act does not prevent a court from exercising its discretion, such discretion was appropriate in this case, and the defendants' application to stay proceedings was therefore refused.

At the British Columbia Court of Appeal, the appeal was dismissed for different reasons than were given in the Supreme Court. In a unanimous ruling, Grauer JA held:

- as was recently discussed in Uber Technologies Inc v Heller, the doctrine of separability holds that arbitration clauses constitute agreements separate from their underlying contracts.
- the Receiver is a court-appointed officer, and by acting in that capacity "the receiver acts not as agent of the debtor (Petrowest), who has been legally paralyzed from acting, but rather acts in fulfilment of its own court-authorized and fiduciary duties, owed to all stakeholders. Petrowest, on the other hand, can do nothing."
- the Receiver had disclaimed the arbitration clauses, they became "void, inoperative or incapable of being performed", (Note: under s. 15(2) of the BC Act in force at the time) and therefore the Arbitration Act was therefore not engaged.
- it was unnecessary to consider the question of inherent jurisdiction in the matter.

In June 2021, the Supreme Court of Canada granted leave to appeal.

== At the Supreme Court of Canada ==
The appeal was dismissed, with costs throughout. The BC Court of Appeal erred in holding that the Receiver was not a party to the arbitration agreements. However, the judge at first instance was entitled to refuse to grant a stay, and in the circumstances she correctly dismissed the stay application.

=== Majority ===
[72] In many cases, the shared interests in expediency, procedural flexibility, and specialized expertise will converge through arbitration. In such a scenario, the parties should be held to their agreement to arbitrate notwithstanding ongoing insolvency proceedings. In other words, the court should grant a stay of legal proceedings in favour of arbitration, and any dispute as to the scope of the arbitration agreement or the arbitrator’s jurisdiction should be left to the arbitrator to resolve. As is evident from the foregoing, valid arbitration agreements are generally to be respected. This presumption in favour of arbitral jurisdiction is supported by this Court’s longstanding jurisprudence, the pro‑arbitration stance adopted in provincial and territorial legislation nationwide, and the foundational principle that contracting parties are free to structure their affairs as they see fit.

[73] However, in certain insolvency matters, it may be necessary to preclude arbitration in favour of a centralized judicial process. This may occur when arbitration would compromise the orderly and efficient conduct of a court‑ordered receivership. In such a scenario, a court may assert control over the proceedings, both to ensure the timely resolution of the parties’ dispute and to protect the public interest in the orderly restructuring or dissolution of the debtor and the equal treatment of its creditors. This authority arises from the statutory jurisdiction conferred on superior courts under ss. 243(1) and 183(1) of the BIA.

Côté J noted that the result was "context‑specific", as "arbitration law and insolvency law ... have much in common, including an emphasis on efficiency and expediency, procedural flexibility, and expert decision‑making." While arbitration is generally to be favoured, insolvency law may require it to be displaced to ensure a more timely resolution. She gave guidance as to which course is preferable in given circumstances.

Stays of proceedings in favour of arbitration are preferred where:

- an arbitration agreement exists;
- court proceedings have been commenced by a party to the arbitration agreement
- the court proceedings are in respect of a matter that the parties agreed to submit to arbitration; and
- the party applying for a stay in favour of arbitration does so before taking any “step” in the court proceedings.

A stay may be refused where an arbitration agreement is "void, inoperative or incapable of being performed":

- "void" encompasses agreements obtained by "undermined by fraud, undue influence, unconscionability, duress, mistake, or misrepresentation"
- "inoperative" circumstances "include frustration, discharge by breach, waiver, or a subsequent agreement between the parties"
- an agreement is "incapable of being performed" where there is "a physical or legal impediment beyond the parties’ control"

The BIA gives a court jurisdiction to find an agreement "inoperative", having regard to the following factors:

1. The effect of arbitration on the integrity of the insolvency proceedings
2. The relative prejudice to the parties from the referral of the dispute to arbitration
3. The urgency of resolving the dispute
4. The applicability of a stay of proceedings under bankruptcy or insolvency law
5. Any other factor the court considers material in the circumstances

Applying these tests to the case at hand, a mandatory stay of proceedings was available under the Arbitration Act, as the Receiver was a party to the agreements, but enforcing them "would compromise the orderly and efficient resolution of the receivership, contrary to the purposes of the BIA." Accordingly, they were inoperative under the Act.

=== Concurrence ===
While agreeing with the majority as to the outcome, Jamal J argued that the Receiver was operating under the terms granted by the underlying receivership order (which gave the Receiver the choice of pursuing either arbitration or court proceedings), and the arbitration agreements were accordingly disclaimed by his choosing to sue in court for the disputed amounts. If his action is challenged, it is up to the court to determine whether he was acting within the scope of the order.

== Impact and aftermath ==
The test outlined by Côté J is relevant to suits or proceedings brought by a debtor, as those against a debtor are normally stayed in insolvency cases. In view of the SCC's preference for "efficiency and expediency, procedural flexibility, and expert decision‑making", legal observers suggest that arbitration agreements be as simple, efficient and cost-effective as possible, in order to survive after a party goes into bankruptcy or insolvency.
