= 2018 reasons of the Supreme Court of Canada =

The table below lists the decisions (known as reasons) delivered from the bench by the Supreme Court of Canada during 2018. The table illustrates what reasons were filed by each justice in each case, and which justices joined each reason.

== Reasons ==
Delivered the Court's reason
Joined the Court's reason
Filed a concurrence
Joined a concurrence
Filed a dissent
Joined a dissent
Filed a concurrence/dissent
Joined a concurrence/dissent
Did not participate in the judgment
Did not participate in the final disposition of the judgment
Not a member of the Court at the time of hearing or delivering
- Decisions that do not note a Justice delivering the Court's reason are per coram.
- Multiple concurrences and dissents within a case are numbered, with joining votes numbered accordingly. Justices occasionally join multiple reasons in a single case; each vote is subdivided accordingly.
- Multiple unnumbered reasons are jointly written or delivered.
- Decisions that are given orally from the bench are denoted by a "V"; per coram decisions delivered orally from the bench only note a "V" on the most senior justice on the panel.
- An asterisk ( * ) in the Court's opinion denotes that it was only a majority in part or a plurality.

Case name	Argued	Decided	McLachlin	Wagner	Abella	Moldaver	Karakatsanis	Gascon	Côté	Brown	Rowe	Martin
R v Seipp, 2018 SCC 1	January 16, 2018	January 16, 2018		V
Delta Air Lines Inc v Lukács, 2018 SCC 2	October 4, 2017	January 19, 2018
Quebec (Commission des normes, de l'équité, de la santé et de la sécurité du travail) v Caron, 2018 SCC 3	March 30, 2017	February 1, 2018
Williams Lake Indian Band v Canada (Aboriginal Affairs and Northern Development), 2018 SCC 4	April 26, 2017	February 2, 2018
R v Canadian Broadcasting Corp., 2018 SCC 5	November 1, 2017	February 9, 2018
R v A.R.J.D., 2018 SCC 6	February 9, 2018	February 9, 2018		V
R v G.T.D., 2018 SCC 7	February 14, 2018	February 14, 2018								V
Valard Construction Ltd v Bird Construction Co, 2018 SCC 8	November 7, 2017	February 15, 2018
R. v. A.G.W., 2018 SCC 9	February 16, 2018	February 16, 2018			V
R. v. Black, 2018 SCC 10	March 13, 2018	March 13, 2018		V
Case name	Argued	Decided	McLachlin	Wagner	Abella	Moldaver	Karakatsanis	Gascon	Côté	Brown	Rowe	Martin
International Brotherhood of Electrical Workers Local 773 v Lawrence, 2018 SCC 11	March 20, 2018	March 20, 2018								V
R v Carson, 2018 SCC 12	November 3, 2017	March 23, 2018
R.A. v. Her Majesty The Queen, 2018 SCC 13	March 23, 2018	March 23, 2018				V
R. v. Magoon, 2018 SCC 14	November 27, 2017	April 13, 2018
R v Comeau, 2018 SCC 15	December 6, 2017	April 19, 2018
Office of the Children's Lawyer v. Balev, 2018 SCC 16	November 9, 2017	April 20, 2018
Quebec (Attorney General) v. Alliance du personnel professionnel et technique de la santé et des services sociaux, 2018 SCC 17	October 31, 2017	May 10, 2018
Centrale des syndicats du Québec v. Quebec (Attorney General), 2018 SCC 18	October 31, 2017	May 10, 2018			*
Rankin (Rankin's Garage & Sales) v. J.J., 2018 SCC 19	October 20, 2017	May 11, 2018
R. v. Cain, 2018 SCC 20	May 14, 2018	May 14, 2018		V
Case name	Argued	Decided	McLachlin	Wagner	Abella	Moldaver	Karakatsanis	Gascon	Côté	Brown	Rowe	Martin
R. v. Stephan, 2018 SCC 21	May 15, 2018	May 15, 2018				V
West Fraser Mills Ltd. v. British Columbia (Workers' Compensation Appeal Tribunal), 2018 SCC 22	December 4, 2017	May 18, 2018							1	2	3
R. v. Colling, 2018 SCC 23	May 18, 2018	May 18, 2018			V
R. v. Gulliver, 2018 SCC 24	May 18, 2018	May 18, 2018									V
R v Wong, 2018 SCC 25	November 10, 2017	May 25, 2018
Highwood Congregation of Jehovah's Witnesses (Judicial Committee) v. Wall, 2018 SCC 26	November 2, 2017	May 31, 2018
Groia v Law Society of Upper Canada, 2018 SCC 27	November 6, 2017	June 1, 2018
Haaretz.com v. Goldhar, 2018 SCC 28	November 29, 2017	June 6, 2018		1	2		3		*
Montréal (City) v. Lonardi, 2018 SCC 29	October 3, 2017	June 8, 2018
Ewert v. Canada, 2018 SCC 30	October 12, 2017	June 13, 2018
Case name	Argued	Decided	McLachlin	Wagner	Abella	Moldaver	Karakatsanis	Gascon	Côté	Brown	Rowe	Martin
Canada (Canadian Human Rights Commission) v. Canada (Attorney General), 2018 SCC 31	November 28, 2017	June 14, 2018							1	2	1
Law Society of British Columbia v. Trinity Western University, 2018 SCC 32	November 30, 2017	June 15, 2018	1								2
Trinity Western University v. Law Society of Upper Canada, 2018 SCC 33	November 30, 2017	June 15, 2018	1								2
R v Suter, 2018 SCC 34	October 11, 2017	June 29, 2018
Lorraine (Ville) v. 2646-8926 Québec inc., 2018 SCC 35	January 9, 2018	July 6, 2018
British Columbia v. Philip Morris International, Inc., 2018 SCC 36	January 17, 2018	July 13, 2018
R v Brassington, 2018 SCC 37	March 14, 2018	July 20, 2018
Rogers Communications Inc. v Voltage Pictures LLC, 2018 SCC 38	April 26, 2018	September 14, 2018
Chagnon v Syndicat de la fonction publique et parapublique du Québec, 2018 SCC 39	March 15, 2018	October 5, 2018
Mikisew Cree First Nation v. Canada (Governor General in Council), 2018 SCC 40	January 15, 2018	October 11, 2018			1	3	*		3	2	3	1
Case name	Argued	Decided	McLachlin	Wagner	Abella	Moldaver	Karakatsanis	Gascon	Côté	Brown	Rowe	Martin
R v Cyr-Langlois, 2018 SCC 54	October 15, 2018	October 15, 2018
R v Gagnon, 2018 SCC 41	October 16, 2018	October 16, 2018		V
R v Normore, 2018 SCC 42	October 17, 2018	October 17, 2018		V
3091‑5177 Québec inc. (Éconolodge Aéroport) v. Lombard General Insurance Co. of Canada, 2018 SCC 43	January 10, 2018	October 19, 2018
R v Gubbins, 2018 SCC 44	February 6, 2018	October 26, 2018
R v Awashish, 2018 SCC 45	February 7, 2018	October 26, 2018
Churchill Falls (Labrador) Corporation Limited v. Hydro-Québec, 2018 SCC 46	December 5, 2017	November 2, 2018
Callidus Capital Corp. v. Canada, 2018 SCC 47	November 8, 2018	November 8, 2018						V
Reference re Pan‑Canadian Securities Regulation, 2018 SCC 48	March 22, 2018	November 9, 2018
R. v. Youssef, 2018 SCC 49	November 9, 2018	November 9, 2018							V
Case name	Argued	Decided	McLachlin	Wagner	Abella	Moldaver	Karakatsanis	Gascon	Côté	Brown	Rowe	Martin
Mazraani v. Industrial Alliance Insurance and Financial Services Inc., 2018 SCC 50	May 16, 2018	November 16, 2018
R v Ajise, 2018 SCC 51	November 16, 2018	November 16, 2018									V
Moore v. Sweet, 2018 SCC 52	February 8, 2018	November 23, 2018
R v Vice Media Canada Inc., 2018 SCC 53	May 23, 2018	November 30, 2018
Brunette v. Legault Joly Thiffault, s.e.n.c.r.l., 2018 SCC 55	April 23, 2018	December 7, 2018
R v Reeves, 2018 SCC 56	May 17, 2018	December 13, 2018				1			2
R v Culotta, 2018 SCC 57	December 13, 2018	December 13, 2018				V
R v Boudreault, 2018 SCC 58	April 17, 2018	December 14, 2018
R v Quartey, 2018 SCC 59	December 14, 2018	December 14, 2018								V
Case name	Argued	Decided	McLachlin	Wagner	Abella	Moldaver	Karakatsanis	Gascon	Côté	Brown	Rowe	Martin
