= Reasons of the Supreme Court of Canada by Chief Justice Wagner =

This is a list of all the reasons written by Justice Richard Wagner during his tenure as puisne, then later chief justice of the Supreme Court of Canada.

== 2013 ==
XXX statistics

| 8 | Majority or Plurality | 0 | Concurrence | 0 | Other |
| 2 | Dissent | 0 | Concurrence/dissent | Total = | 10 |
| Written opinions = 10 | | Oral opinions = 0 | | Unanimous decisions = 4 |

| Case name | Issue | Co-authored by | Joined by |
|---|---|---|---|
| R v Bélanger; 2013 SCC 7 | Offence of dangerous driving | – | Unanimous |
| R v Pham; 2013 SCC 15 | Collateral consequences in sentencing | – | Unanimous |
| R v Buzizi; 2013 SCC 27 | Criminal defence of provocation and whether the defence should have been put to the jury | – | LeBel J |
| R v Gauthier; 2013 SCC 32 | Elements of the criminal defence of abandonment | – | LeBel, Abella, Rothstein, Moldaver and Karakatsanis JJ |
| R v Youvarajah; 2013 SCC 41 | Admissibility of hearsay evidence: prior inconsistent statements | – | Rothstein J |
| Conseil scolaire francophone de la Colombie-Britannique v British Columbia; 2013 SCC 42 | Civil procedure – Admissibility of affidavits in languages other than English under 1731 English Act received into British Columbia law providing English as language of court "proceedings" | – | McLachlin CJ and Rothstein and Moldaver JJ |
| Payette v Guay inc 2013 SCC 45 | Contracts – Restrictive covenants in agreement for sale of assets | – | Unanimous |
| Régie des rentes du Québec v Canada Bread Company Ltd; 2013 SCC 46 | Judicial review of Régie des rentes du Québec's decision under the Supplemental Pensions Plan Act partially terminating the pension plans of two divisions closed by the employer | – | Abella, Rothstein, Cromwell and Karakatsanis JJ |
| Infineon Technologies AG v Option consommateurs 2013 SCC 59 | Civil procedure – Class actions and court jurisdiction | LeBel J | Unanimous |
| La Souveraine, Compagnie d'assurance générale v Autorité des marchés financiers 2013 SCC 63 | Provincial offences and strict liability under the Quebec Act respecting the distribution of financial products and services | – | McLachlin CJ and Rothstein, Cromwell, Moldaver and Karakatsanis JJ |

== 2014 ==
Statistics

| 14 | Majority or Plurality | 1 | Concurrence | 0 | Other |
| 1 | Dissent | 1 | Concurrence/dissent | Total = | 17 |
| Written opinions = 17 | | Oral opinions = 0 | | Unanimous decisions = 12 |

| Case name | Issue | Co-authored by | Joined by |
|---|---|---|---|
| Vivendi Canada Inc v Dell'Aniello; 2014 SCC 1 | Authorization of class actions | LeBel J | Unanimous |
| R v MacDonald; 2014 SCC 3 | Unreasonable search and seizure | Moldaver J | Rothstein J |
| Canada (AG) v Whaling; 2014 SCC 20 | Double jeopardy and s. 11(d) of the Charter | – | Unanimous |
| Reference Re Supreme Court Act, ss 5 and 6; 2014 SCC 21 | Eligibility requirements to the Supreme Court of Canada | McLachlin CJ and LeBel, Abella, Cromwell and Karakatsanis JJ | – |
| Peracomo Inc v TELUS Communications Co; 2014 SCC 29 | Maritime law and tort liability | – | |
| Ontario (Community Safety and Correctional Services) v Ontario (Information and Privacy Commissioner); 2014 SCC 31 | Access to information and exemptions under the Freedom of Information and Protection of Privacy Act | Cromwell J | Unanimous |
| Immeubles Jacques Robitaille inc v Quebec (City of); 2014 SCC 34 | Municipal law and by-law offences | – | Unanimous |
| Union Carbide Canada Inc v Bombardier Inc; 2014 SCC 35 | Settlement privilege and offers to settle | – | Unanimous |
| United Food and Commercial Workers, Local 503 v Wal-Mart Canada Corp; 2014 SCC 45 | Judicial review of labour arbitration decision and employer's unilateral change of employment conditions under s. 59 of the Quebec Labour Code | Rothstein J | – |
| Canada (AG) v Confédération des syndicats nationaux 2014 SCC 49 | Motions to dismiss | LeBel J | Unanimous |
| R v Taylor; 2014 SCC 50 | Right to counsel under s. 10(b) of the Charter | – | Unanimous |
| Quebec (Commission des normes du travail) v Asphalte Desjardins inc 2014 SCC 51 | Employment contracts of an indefinite duration and the obligation to give notice of termination | – | Unanimous |
| Marcotte v Fédération des caisses Desjardins du Québec; 2014 SCC 57 | Division of powers and bills of exchange | Rothstein J | Unanimous |
| Bank of Montreal v Marcotte; 2014 SCC 55 | Class actions and standing | Rothstein J | Unanimous |
| Amex Bank of Canada v Adams; 2014 SCC 56 | Class actions and the Quebec Consumer Protection Act | Rothstein J | Unanimous |
| R v Steele; 2014 SCC 61 | Whether robbery committed by using threats of violence to a person falls within the meaning of "serious personal injury offence" under s. 752.1(1) of the Criminal Code | – | Unanimous |
| Imperial Oil v Jacques; 2014 SCC 66 | Whether a party to a civil proceeding can request disclosure of recordings of private communications intercepted by the state in the course of a criminal investigation | LeBel J | Rothstein, Cromwell and Moldaver JJ |

== 2015 ==
Statistics

| 7 | Majority or Plurality | 1 | Concurrence | 0 | Other |
| 2 | Dissent | 2 | Concurrence/dissent | Total = | 12 |
| Written opinions = 11 | | Oral opinions = 1 | | Unanimous decisions = 5 |

| Case name | Issue | Co-authored by | Joined by |
|---|---|---|---|
| Saskatchewan Federation of Labour v Saskatchewan; 2015 SCC 4 | Whether a right to strike is protected by freedom of association under s. 2(d) of the Charter; Whether prohibition on essential employees participating in strike action amounts to substantial interference with a meaningful process of collective bargaining | Rothstein J | – |
| Potter v New Brunswick Legal Aid Services Commission; 2015 SCC 10 | Whether administrative suspension constitutes a unilateral act amounting to a breach of contract via constructive dismissal; Whether pension benefits should be deducted from damages for wrongful dismissal | – | Abella, Rothstein, Moldaver and Karakatsanis JJ |
| Quebec (AG) v Canada (AG); 2015 SCC 14 | Whether federal legislation abolishing the long-gun registry also containing provision requiring the destruction of long-gun registration data is ultra vires the criminal law power of Parliament under s. 91(27) of the Constitution Act, 1867 | LeBel and Gascon JJ | – |
| Quebec (AG) v Canada (AG); 2015 SCC 22 | Constitutionality of an appointment to the Court of Appeal of Quebec from the Federal Court of Appeal under s. 98 of the Constitution Act, 1867 | – | Unanimous (oral) |
| R v St-Cloud; 2015 SCC 27 | Interpretation of s. 515(10)(c) of the Criminal Code permitting a trial judge to order the detention of the accused if it "is necessary to maintain confidence in the administration of justice" | – | Unanimous |
| Hinse v Canada (AG); 2015 SCC 35 | Crown's power of mercy vested in the federal Minister of Justice under the Criminal Code; Standard of fault applicable to Minister's refusal to exercise Crown's power of mercy; Whether, in the case of abuse of process and where there is pro bono agreement, damages can be awarded in Quebec in respect of extrajudicial fees in order to compensate a party who has suffered damages resulting from the fault of another party | Gascon J | Unanimous |
| Société en commandite Place Mullins v Services immobiliers Diane Bisson inc 2015 SCC 36 | Dispute of brokerage contracts | – | Unanimous |
| Strickland v Canada (AG); 2015 SCC 37 | Whether provincial superior courts have jurisdiction to address validity of federal child support guidelines | Abella J | – |
| Quebec (Commission des droits de la personne et des droits de la jeunesse) v Bombardier Inc (Bombardier Aerospace Training Center); 2015 SCC 39 | Discrimination and right to equality under s. 10 of the Quebec Charter of Human Rights and Freedoms | Côté J | Unanimous |
| Guindon v Canada; 2015 SCC 41 | Whether proceedings under s. 163.2 of the Income Tax Act imposing monetary penalties on every person who makes a false statement that could be used by another person for purposes under that Act are criminal in nature or lead to the imposition of true penal consequences; Whether an individual assessed for same penalties is a person "charged with an offence" within the meaning of s. 11 of the Charter | Abella J | Karakatsanis J |
| Caron v Alberta; 2015 SCC 56 | Whether provincial Languages Act is ultra vires or inoperative insofar that by requiring provincial laws and regulates to be enacted, printed and published in English only, it abrogates the constitutional duty owed by Alberta to enact, print and publish its laws and regulations in both English and French in Rupert's Land and North-Western Territory Order (1870) | Côté J | Abella J |
| R v Lacasse; 2015 SCC 64 | Sentencing and power of an appellate court | – | Abella, Moldaver, Karakatsanis and Côté JJ |

== 2016 ==
- R v Lloyd, 2016 SCC 13 (concurrence/dissent)
- Canada (AG) v Chambre des notaires du Québec, 2016 SCC 20 (unanimous)
- Canada (National Revenue) v Thompson, 2016 SCC 21 (unanimous)
- Rogers Communications Inc v Chateauguay (City of), 2016 SCC 23 (majority)
- Wilson v Atomic Energy of Canada Ltd, 2016 SCC 29 (concurrence)
- Ferme Vi-Ber inc v Financière agricole du Québec, 2016 SCC 34 (majority)
- Ledcor Construction Ltd v Northbridge Indemnity Insurance Co, 2016 SCC 37 (majority)
- Conférence des juges de paix magistrats du Québec v Quebec (AG), 2016 SCC 39 (unanimous)
- R v C K-D, 2016 SCC 41 (oral; unanimous)
- Endean v British Columbia, 2016 SCC 42 (concurrence)
- Morasse v Nadeau-Dubois, 2016 SCC 44 (dissent)

== 2017 ==
Richard Wagner 2017 statistics

| 9 | Majority or Plurality | 1 | Concurrence | 0 | Other |
| 0 | Dissent | 0 | Concurrence/dissent | Total = | 10 |
| Written opinions = 8 | | Oral opinions = 2 | | Unanimous decisions = 3 |

| Case name | Issue | Co-authored by | Joined by |
|---|---|---|---|
| Godbout v Pagé; 2017 SCC 18 | Automobile insurance and bodily injuries | – | McLachlin CJ and Abella, Karakatsanis, Gascon and Brown JJ |
| Green v Law Society of Manitoba; 2017 SCC 19 | Law of professions – Lawyers and continuing professional development | – | McLachlin CJ and Moldaver, Karakatsanis and Gascon JJ |
| Desjardins Financial Security Life Assurance Co v Émond; 2017 SCC 20 | Insurance and exclusionary clauses | – | Unanimous (oral) |
| R v Savard; 2017 SCC 21 | [DESCRIPTION] | – | Unanimous (oral) |
| R v Antic; 2017 SCC 27 | Right not to be denied reasonable bail without just cause | – | Unanimous |
| Stewart v Elk Valley Coal Corp; 2017 SCC 30 | Discrimination based on mental and physical disability | Moldaver J | – |
| Douez v Facebook, Inc; 2017 SCC 33 | Private international law – Jurisdiction | Karakatsanis and Gascon JJ | – |
| Quebec (AG) v Guérin; 2017 SCC 42 | Standard of review of arbitration decisions | Gascon J | McLachlin CJ and Karakatsanis J |
| Uniprix inc v Gestion Gosselin et Bérubé inc 2017 SCC 43 | Contract interpretation and renewal clauses | Gascon J | Abella, Moldaver, Karakatsanis and Brown JJ |
| Montreal (City of) v Dorval; 2017 SCC 48 | Civil liability of municipalities | – | McLachlin CJ and Abella, Moldaver and Gascon JJ |

== 2018 ==
- R. v. Cyr-Langlois, 2018 SCC 54 (CanLII), [2018] 3 SCR 456
- R. v. Normore, 2018 SCC 42 (CanLII), [2018] 3 SCR 5
- R. v. Gagnon, 2018 SCC 41 (CanLII), [2018] 3 SCR 3
- Lorraine (Ville) v. 2646‑8926 Québec inc., 2018 SCC 35 (CanLII), [2018] 2 SCR 577
- Trinity Western University v. Law Society of Upper Canada, 2018 SCC 33 (CanLII), [2018] 2 SCR 453
- Law Society of British Columbia v. Trinity Western University, 2018 SCC 32 (CanLII), [2018] 2 SCR 293
- Ewert v. Canada, 2018 SCC 30 (CanLII), [2018] 2 SCR 165
- Haaretz.com v. Goldhar, 2018 SCC 28 (CanLII), [2018] 2 SCR 3
- R. v. Wong, 2018 SCC 25 (CanLII), [2018] 1 SCR 696
- R. v. Cain, 2018 SCC 20 (CanLII), [2018] 1 SCR 631
- R. v. Black, 2018 SCC 10 (CanLII), [2018] 1 SCR 265
- R. v. A.R.J.D., 2018 SCC 6 (CanLII), [2018] 1 SCR 218
- Williams Lake Indian Band v. Canada (Aboriginal Affairs and Northern Development), 2018 SCC 4 (CanLII), [2018] 1 SCR 83
- R. v. Seipp, 2018 SCC 1 (CanLII), [2018] 1 SCR 3

== 2019 ==
- Bell Canada v. Canada (Attorney General), 2019 SCC 66 (CanLII), [2019] 4 SCR 845
- Canada (Minister of Citizenship and Immigration) v. Vavilov, 2019 SCC 65 (CanLII), [2019] 4 SCR 653
- Canada (Attorney General) v. British Columbia Investment Management Corp., 2019 SCC 63 (CanLII), [2019] 4 SCR 559
- International Air Transport Association v. Instrubel, N.V., 2019 SCC 61 (CanLII), [2019] 4 SCR 469
- Desgagnés Transport Inc. v. Wärtsilä Canada Inc., 2019 SCC 58 (CanLII), [2019] 4 SCR 228
- Montréal (City) v. Octane Stratégie inc., 2019 SCC 57 (CanLII), [2019] 4 SCR 138
- R. v. Javanmardi, 2019 SCC 54 (CanLII), [2019] 4 SCR 3
- Volkswagen Group Canada Inc. v. Association québécoise de lutte contre la pollution atmosphérique, 2019 SCC 53 (CanLII), [2019] 3 SCR 920
- R. v. James, 2019 SCC 52 (CanLII), [2019] 3 SCR 918
- Toronto-Dominion Bank v. Young, 2019 CanLII 127841 (SCC)
- Threlfall v. Carleton University, 2019 SCC 50 (CanLII), [2019] 3 SCR 726
- Denis v. Côté, 2019 SCC 44 (CanLII), [2019] 3 SCR 482
- R. v. Thanabalasingham, 2019 SCC 21 (CanLII), [2019] 2 SCR 317
- R. v. Myers, 2019 SCC 18 (CanLII), [2019] 2 SCR 105
- R. v. Jarvis, 2019 SCC 10 (CanLII), [2019] 1 SCR 488
- R. v. C.J., 2019 SCC 8 (CanLII), [2019] 1 SCR 484
- Orphan Well Association v. Grant Thornton Ltd., 2019 SCC 5 (CanLII), [2019] 1 SCR 150
- Frank v. Canada (Attorney General), 2019 SCC 1 (CanLII), [2019] 1 SCR 3

== 2020 ==
- R. v. W.M., 2020 SCC 42 (CanLII), [2020] 3 SCR 787
- Toronto‑Dominion Bank v. Young, 2020 SCC 15 (CanLII), [2020] 2 SCR 90
- Conseil scolaire francophone de la Colombie‑Britannique v. British Columbia, 2020 SCC 13 (CanLII), [2020] 1 SCR 678
- 9354-9186 Québec inc. v. Callidus Capital Corp., 2020 SCC 10 (CanLII), [2020] 1 SCR 521
- R. v. Friesen, 2020 SCC 9 (CanLII), [2020] 1 SCR 424
- Newfoundland and Labrador (Attorney General) v. Uashaunnuat (Innu of Uashat and of Mani‑Utenam), 2020 SCC 4 (CanLII), [2020] 1 SCR 15

== 2021 ==
- Montréal (City) v. Deloitte Restructuring Inc., 2021 SCC 53 (CanLII), [2021] 3 SCR 736
- Kreke v. Alansari, 2021 SCC 50 (CanLII), [2021] 2 SCR 685
- H.M.B. Holdings Ltd. v. Antigua and Barbuda, 2021 SCC 44 (CanLII), [2021] 3 SCR 285
- Ward v. Quebec (Commission des droits de la personne et des droits de la jeunesse), 2021 SCC 43 (CanLII), [2021] 3 SCR 176
- Toronto (City) v. Ontario (Attorney General), 2021 SCC 34 (CanLII), [2021] 2 SCR 845
- Reference re Code of Civil Procedure (Que.), art. 35, 2021 SCC 27 (CanLII), [2021] 2 SCR 291
- MediaQMI inc. v. Kamel, 2021 SCC 23 (CanLII), [2021] 1 SCR 899
- R. v. C.P., 2021 SCC 19 (CanLII), [2021] 1 SCR 679
- R. v. Ramos, 2021 SCC 15 (CanLII), [2021] 1 SCR 528
- R. v. Gul, 2021 SCC 14 (CanLII), [2021] 1 SCR 525
- R. v. Sheikh, 2021 SCC 13 (CanLII), [2021] 1 SCR 523
- R. v. Ghotra, 2021 SCC 12 (CanLII), [2021] 1 SCR 521
- References re Greenhouse Gas Pollution, 2021 SCC 11 (CanLII), [2021] 1 SCR 175
- R. v. Murtaza, 2021 SCC 4 (CanLII), [2021] 1 SCR 12
- R. v. Deslauriers, 2021 SCC 3 (CanLII), [2021] 1 SCR 9

== 2022 ==
- R. v. J.J., 2022 SCC 28 (CanLII), [2022] 2 SCR 3
- British Columbia (Attorney General) v. Council of Canadians with Disabilities, 2022 SCC 27 (CanLII), [2022] 1 SCR 794
- R. v. Bissonnette, 2022 SCC 23 (CanLII), [2022] 1 SCR 597
- R. v. J.F., 2022 SCC 17 (CanLII), [2022] 1 SCR 330
- R. v. Alas, 2022 SCC 14 (CanLII), [2022] 1 SCR 283
- R. v. Vallières, 2022 SCC 10 (CanLII), [2022] 1 SCR 144
- R. v. Pope, 2022 SCC 8 (CanLII), [2022] 1 SCR 69
- R. v. Brunelle, 2022 SCC 5 (CanLII), [2022] 1 SCR 25

== 2023 ==
- Sharp v. Autorité des marchés financiers, 2023 SCC 29 (CanLII)
- Reference re Impact Assessment Act, 2023 SCC 23 (CanLII)
- La Presse inc. v. Quebec, 2023 SCC 22 (CanLII)
- R. v. Hay, 2023 SCC 15 (CanLII)
- Murray‑Hall v. Quebec (Attorney General), 2023 SCC 10 (CanLII)
- R. v. McColman, 2023 SCC 8 (CanLII)
- R. v. Chatillon, 2023 SCC 7 (CanLII)
- R. v. S.S., 2023 SCC 1 (CanLII)

== 2024 ==
- Quebec (Commission des droits de la personne et des droits de la jeunesse) v. Directrice de la protection de la jeunesse du CISSS A, 2024 SCC 43 (CanLII)
- Dunmore v. Mehralian, 2024 CanLII 121992 (SCC)
- Canada (Attorney General) v. Power, 2024 SCC 26 (CanLII)
- R. v. Tayo Tompouba, 2024 SCC 16 (CanLII)
- R. v. D.F., 2024 SCC 14 (CanLII)
- R. v. Vu, 2024 SCC 1 (CanLII)

== 2025 ==
- R. v. Sheppard, 2025 CanLII 34830 (SCC)
- R. v. Pan, 2025 SCC 12 (CanLII)
- R. v. R.A., 2025 SCC 7 (CanLII)
- John Howard Society of Saskatchewan v. Saskatchewan (Attorney General), 2025 SCC 6 (CanLII)
- Ontario (Attorney General) v. Working Families Coalition (Canada) Inc., 2025 SCC 5 (CanLII)
- R. v. Chicoine-Joubert, 2025 SCC 3 (CanLII)
- R. v. Bilodeau, 2025 SCC 2 (CanLII)
- R. v. Hanrahan, 2025 SCC 1 (CanLII)
- R. v. Di Paola, 2025 CanLII 10448 (SCC)
