= Life imprisonment in Canada =

Life imprisonment in Canada is a criminal sentence for certain offences that lasts for the offender’s life. Parole is possible, but even if paroled, the offender remains under the supervision of Corrections Canada for their lifetime, and can be returned to prison for parole violations.

A person serving a life sentence must serve for a certain length of time before becoming eligible for parole. First degree murder and high treason carry the longest period of parole ineligibility in the Criminal Code, at 25 years. A statutory amendment to allow periods of parole ineligibility greater than 25 years was held to be unconstitutional by the Supreme Court of Canada in R v Bissonnette (2022 SCC 23), as contrary to section 12 of the Canadian Charter of Rights and Freedoms, which prohibits cruel and unusual punishment. Parole eligibility for second degree murder typically varies between 10 and 25 years, and is set by the sentencing judge.

A life sentence is the most severe punishment for any crime in Canada. Criminal laws are enacted by the Parliament of Canada and apply uniformly across the country.

== Mandatory life sentence ==
High treason and first degree murder carry a mandatory sentence of life imprisonment with a full parole ineligibility period of 25 years. Previously, in the case of high treason or first-degree murder (where the offender had been convicted of a single murder) offenders could have their parole ineligibility period reduced to no less than 15 years under the faint hope clause. However, that option was abolished by Parliament for offences committed after December 2, 2011, though it remains if the offence was committed before that date.

Second degree murder also carries a mandatory sentence of life imprisonment but with a parole ineligibility period of between 10 years and 25 years. Courts determine the parole ineligibility period based on the gravity of the offence.

=== Multiple murders ===
An amendment to the Criminal Code passed in 2014 granted courts the authority to issue consecutive life sentences, in effect allowing for multiple periods of parole ineligibility to be stacked and lead to a total parole ineligibility period of greater than 25 years. In the most extreme cases, it authorized a de facto term of life imprisonment without parole (i.e. when the total parole ineligibility period extends beyond the offender's life expectancy).

This provision was used in several cases of multiple murders, to set parole ineligibility periods greater than 25 years, including: 35 years (Benjamin Hudon-Barbeau); 40 years (Travis Baumgartner, Alexandre Bissonnette); 50 years (Edward Downey, Emanuel Kahsai and Mark Smich); 70 years (Basil Borutski); and 75 years (Justin Bourque, John Paul Ostamas, Douglas Garland, Derek Saretzky and Mark Smich's accomplice, Dellen Millard).

The provision permitting multiple murderers to receive consecutive parole ineligibility periods for the individual murders they committed was held unconstitutional in 2022 by the Supreme Court in R v Bissonnette, which held that it authorized cruel and unusual punishment. The Supreme Court ruled that Alexandre Bissonnette, who attacked the Islamic Cultural Centre in Quebec City in 2017 and murdered six worshippers, would be permitted the option of applying for parole after 25 years. The ruling meant that Bissonnette would be eligible for day parole by 2039. The ruling also meant that all other multiple murderers in Canada who had received periods of parole ineligibility greater than 25 years would now have the same parole ineligibility of 25 years in prison.

== Other offences ==
Offences under the Criminal Code that carry a maximum penalty of life imprisonment in Canada (with a parole ineligibility period of between 7 years and 25 years) include treason, piracy, mutiny, aircraft hijacking, endangering the safety of an aircraft or an airport, endangering the safety of a ship or fixed platform, refusing to disperse after a riot proclamation, arson (disregard for human life), robbery, kidnapping, break and enter with intent, attempted murder, accessory after the fact to murder, conspiracy to commit murder, manslaughter, causing death by street racing, impaired driving causing death, causing death by criminal negligence, killing an unborn child in the act of birth, and aggravated sexual assault.

Under the Controlled Drugs and Substances Act, trafficking, exporting or production of schedule I or II substances also carries a maximum penalty of life imprisonment with a parole ineligibility period of between 7 years and 25 years.

Current sentencing practices ensure that, except in the case of murder, a life sentence is rarely imposed. One common exception is cases which involve terrorism-related conspiracies.

As of 2013, 4,800 offenders were serving life sentences in Canada, though only 2,880 (around 60%) were incarcerated, the remainder being on parole. The vast majority of these offenders (about 96%) were serving their sentences for murder. "Lifers" constituted 23% of the federal offender population.

There is no guarantee that parole will be granted to an offender. If the Parole Board of Canada determines that an offender still poses a risk to society, that person may be detained in prison past the parole eligibility period. Any person released on parole from a term of life imprisonment or an indeterminate term of imprisonment must remain on parole, with conditions by the Parole Board, for the rest of the person's life. Violation of parole terms can result in the Parole Board imposing stricter conditions, or revoking the parole entirely, resulting in the person going back to prison.

== Dangerous offender ==
While life sentences are rare in non-murder cases, the courts may apply a dangerous offender designation in cases involving serious violent or sexual offences. Such a designation may result in an indeterminate sentence with no maximum limit, but a parole review occurs after 7 years and every 2 years after that.

Despite formal parole eligibility after seven years, full parole is rare in cases where a dangerous offender is serving an indeterminate sentence as this provision is reserved for individuals assessed as likely to commit further serious violent offences. In violent non-murder cases involving repeat offenders, it is more likely to be used than a sentence of life imprisonment. As of 2012, nearly 500 inmates had a "Dangerous Offender" designation constituting about 3% of the federal offender population. Three years later, in 2015, 622 federal offenders had a Dangerous Offender designation. Of these, 586 (or some 94%) were incarcerated (representing 3.9% of the In-Custody Population) and 36 were in the community under supervision. This supervision lasts for the remainder of the offender's life.

== Youth sentencing ==
A young person (12 to 17) does not face a life sentence unless they are sentenced as an adult, since the maximum sentence under the Youth Criminal Justice Act is 10 years (for first-degree murder). A person can be sentenced as an adult if they were at least 14 years old at the time of the offence. The crown carries the burden of proving an adult sentence is appropriate and a presumption in favour of a youth sentence always exists, irrespective of the offenders age or the type of offence. Even if the crown does discharge its burden of proving an adult sentence is justified, the period of parole ineligibility for murder is nonetheless different for youths.

Parole ineligibility periods for youth sentenced as adults for murder
Offence	Circumstances	Parole ineligibility period
First Degree murder	Where the offender was 16 or 17 years old at the time of the offence	10 years
First Degree murder	Where the offender was 14 or 15 years old at the time of the offence	5–7 years
Second degree murder	Where the offender was 16 or 17 years old at the time of the offence	7 years
Second degree murder	Where the offender was 14 or 15 years old at the time of the offence	5–7 years

== See also ==
- Life imprisonment, worldwide overview
