= Reasons of the Supreme Court of Canada by Justice Brown =

The following is a list of Supreme Court of Canada opinions written by Russell Brown during his tenure on the Court.

== 2016 ==
2016 statistics

7	Majority or Plurality	0	Concurrence	0	Other
3	Dissent	3	Concurrence/dissent	Total =	13
Written opinions = 13		Oral opinions = 0		Unanimous decisions = 1

Case name	Issue	Co-authored by	Joined by
Carter v Canada (AG); 2016 SCC 4	Motion seeking an order extending the suspension of the declaration of constitutional invalidity issued in Carter v Canada (AG), 2015 SCC 5	McLachlin CJ and Cromwell and Moldaver JJ	–
R v Lloyd; 2016 SCC 13	Cruel and unusual treatment or punishment in violation of s. 12 of the Charter	Wagner and Gascon JJ	–
Krayzel Corp v Equitable Trust Co; 2016 SCC 18	Interest rates on money in arrears	–	McLachlin CJ and Cromwell, Karakatsanis, Wagner and Gascon JJ
British Columbia (Workers' Compensation Appeal Tribunal) v Fraser Health Authority; 2016 SCC 25	Standard of proof of causation of occupational disease	–	McLachlin CJ and Abella, Moldaver, Karakatsanis and Wagner JJ
R v Williamson; 2016 SCC 28	Right to be tried within a reasonable time under s. 11 of the Charter	Moldaver and Karakatsanis JJ	Abella and Côté JJ
R v Jordan; 2016 SCC 27	Right to be tried within a reasonable time under s. 11 of the Charter	Moldaver and Karakatsanis JJ	Abella and Côté JJ
Wilson v Atomic Energy of Canada Ltd; 2016 SCC 29	Unjust dismissal under the Canada Labour Code	Côté J	Moldaver J
R v KRJ; 2016 SCC 31	Sentencing and s. 11 of the Charter	–	–
Musqueam Indian Band v Musqueam Indian Band (Board of Review); 2016 SCC 36	Indian reserves and assessment of leased lands for taxation purposes	–	Unanimous
Canada (AG) v Igloo Vikski Inc; 2016 SCC 38	Customs and excise taxation and International trade	–	McLachlin CJ and Abella, Cromwell, Moldaver, Karakatsanis, Wagner and Gascon J
Edmonton (City of) v Edmonton East (Capilano) Shopping Centres Ltd; 2016 SCC 47	Municipal property assessment for taxation purposes	Côté J	McLachlin CJ and Moldaver J
Windsor (City of) v Canadian Transit Co; 2016 SCC 54	Jurisdiction of courts	Moldaver J	Côté J
Canada (AG) v Fairmont Hotels Inc; 2016 SCC 56	Contracts and rectification of written instrument recording prior agreement	–	McLachlin CJ and Cromwell, Moldaver, Karakatsanis, Wagner and Gascon JJ

== 2017 ==
2017 statistics

9	Majority or Plurality	1	Concurrence	0	Other
2	Dissent	1	Concurrence/dissent	Total =	13
Written opinions = 13		Oral opinions = 0		Unanimous decisions = 6

Case name	Issue	Co-authored by	Joined by
Ernst v Alberta Energy Regulator; 2017 SCC 1	Freedom of expression and Charter damages	McLachlin CJ and Moldaver J	Côté J
Nelson (City of) v Mowatt; 2017 SCC 8	Real property and adverse possession	–	Unanimous
R v Paterson; 2017 SCC 15	Constitutional law – search and seizure	–	McLachlin CJ and Abella, Karakatsanis and Wagner JJ
Saadati v Moorhead; 2017 SCC 28	Negligence and damage from mental injury	–	Unanimous
Clyde River (Hamlet of) v Petroleum Geo-Services Inc; 2017 SCC 40	Aboriginal treaty rights and the Crown's duty to consult	Karakatsanis J	Unanimous
Chippewas of the Thames First Nation v Enbridge Pipelines Inc; 2017 SCC 41	Aboriginal treaty rights and the Crown's duty to consult	Karakatsanis J	Unanimous
Quebec (AG) v Guérin; 2017 SCC 42	Standard of review of arbitration decisions	Rowe J	–
Canada (AG) v Thouin; 2017 SCC 46	Civil procedure and immunity	Gascon J	Unanimous
Canada (AG) v Fontaine; 2017 SCC 47	Civil procedure – Settlement of class proceedings	Rowe J	Unanimous
Montreal (City of) v Dorval; 2017 SCC 48	Civil liability of municipalities	Côté J	–
Barreau du Québec v Quebec (AG); 2017 SCC 56	Administrative law – Judicial review of Administrative Tribunal of Québec decision	–	McLachlin CJ and Abella, Moldaver, Karakatsanis, Wagner, Gascon and Rowe JJ
Cowper-Smith v Morgan; 2017 SCC 61	Wills and estates and defence of proprietary estoppel	–	–
Deloitte & Touche v Livent Inc (Receiver of); 2017 SCC 63	Tort of negligence; duty of care and negligent misrepresentation by auditor	Gascon J	Karakatsanis and Rowe JJ

== 2018 ==
2018 statistics

0	Majority or Plurality	0	Concurrence	0	Other
0	Dissent	0	Concurrence/dissent	Total =	0
Written opinions =		Oral opinions =		Unanimous decisions =

Case name	Issue	Co-authored by	Joined by
Williams Lake Indian Band v Canada (Aboriginal Affairs and Northern Development); 2018 SCC 4	Aboriginal law and fiduciary duties; administrative law	–	McLachlin CJ
R v Canadian Broadcasting Corp; 2018 SCC 5	Mandatory injunctions	–	Unanimous
R v GTD; 2018 SCC 7	Right to counsel	–	Abella, Côté and Martin JJ
Valard Construction Ltd v Bird Construction Co; 2018 SCC 8	Trusts; duty to disclose existence	–	McLachlin CJ and Abella, Moldaver and Rowe JJ
International Brotherhood of Electrical Workers (IBEW) Local 773 v Lawrence; 2018 SCC 11	Civil procedure	–	Wagner CJ and Moldaver, Karakatsanis, Gascon, Côté, Rowe and Martin JJ
Quebec (Attorney General) v Alliance du personnel professionnel et technique de la santé et des services sociaux 2018 SCC 17	Right to equality; pay equity	Côté and Rowe JJ	–
Centrale des syndicats du Québec v Quebec (Attorney General); 2018 SCC 18	Right to equality; pay equity	Côté and Rowe JJ	–
Rankin (Rankin's Garage & Sales) v JJ; 2018 SCC 19	Tort of negligence; duty of care and illegality	–	Gascon J
West Fraser Mills Ltd v British Columbia (Workers’ Compensation Appeal Tribunal); 2018 SCC 22	Administrative law; standard of review	–	–
R v Wong (2018); 2018 SCC 25	Withdrawal of guilty plea	Moldaver and Gascon JJ	–
Canada (Canadian Human Rights Commission) v Canada (Attorney General); 2018 SCC 31	Administrative law; standard of review	–	–
Law Society of British Columbia v Trinity Western University; 2018 SCC 32	Freedom of religion; jurisdiction of professional regulators	Côté J	–
Trinity Western University v Law Society of Upper Canada; 2018 SCC 33	Freedom of religion; jurisdiction of professional regulators	Côté J	–
British Columbia v Philip Morris International, Inc; 2018 SCC 36	Civil procedure	–	Unanimous
Rogers Communications Inc v Voltage Pictures, LLC; 2018 SCC 38	Norwich orders	–	Wagner CJ and Abella, Moldaver, Karakatsanis, Gascon, Rowe and Martin JJ
Chagnon v Syndicat de la fonction publique et parapublique du Québec; 2018 SCC 39	Parliamentary privilege	Côté J	–
Mikisew Cree First Nation v Canada (Governor General in Council); 2018 SCC 40	Separation of powers; parliamentary privilege; duty to consult	–	Moldaver, Côté and Rowe JJ
R v Quartey; 2018 SCC 59	Criminal law; generalizations and stereotypes	–	Moldaver, Karakatsanis, Côté and Martin JJ

== 2019 ==
2019 statistics

0	Majority or Plurality	0	Concurrence	0	Other
0	Dissent	0	Concurrence/dissent	Total =	0
Written opinions =		Oral opinions =		Unanimous decisions =

Case name	Issue	Co-authored by	Joined by

== 2020 ==
2020 statistics

0	Majority or Plurality	0	Concurrence	0	Other
0	Dissent	0	Concurrence/dissent	Total =	0
Written opinions =		Oral opinions =		Unanimous decisions =

Case name	Issue	Co-authored by	Joined by

== 2021 ==
2021 statistics

0	Majority or Plurality	0	Concurrence	0	Other
0	Dissent	0	Concurrence/dissent	Total =	0
Written opinions =		Oral opinions =		Unanimous decisions =

Case name	Issue	Co-authored by	Joined by

== 2022 ==
2022 statistics

0	Majority or Plurality	0	Concurrence	0	Other
0	Dissent	0	Concurrence/dissent	Total =	0
Written opinions =		Oral opinions =		Unanimous decisions =

Case name	Issue	Co-authored by	Joined by

== 2023 ==
2023 statistics

0	Majority or Plurality	0	Concurrence	0	Other
0	Dissent	0	Concurrence/dissent	Total =	0
Written opinions =		Oral opinions =		Unanimous decisions =

Case name	Issue	Co-authored by	Joined by
