= Mary Moreau =

Canadian judge

The Honourable Mary Moreau

Puisne Justice of the Supreme Court of Canada
- Incumbent
- Assumed office November 6, 2023
- Nominated by: Justin Trudeau
- Appointed by: Mary Simon
- Preceded by: Russell Brown

Chief Justice of the Court of King's Bench of Alberta
- In office October 17, 2017 – November 6, 2023
- Nominated by: Justin Trudeau
- Monarchs: Elizabeth II; Charles III
- Premier: Rachel Notley; Jason Kenney; Danielle Smith

Personal details
- Born: 1955 or 1956 (age 70–71) Edmonton, Alberta, Canada
- Education: University of Alberta
- Profession: Lawyer

Mary T. Moreau (born 1955 or 1956) is a Canadian jurist who is serving as a puisne justice on the Supreme Court of Canada since 2023 and is the first Franco-Albertain to sit on the Supreme Court. She formerly served as the chief justice of the Court of King's Bench of Alberta from 2017 to 2023. Her formal welcoming to the Supreme Court of Canada occurred on February 19, 2024.

== Early life and education ==
Moreau was born in Edmonton, Alberta. She attended the University of Alberta Faculty of Law from 1976 to 1979 and obtained her LLB degree in 1979. She enrolled in a Civil Code of Québec study program at the University of Sherbrooke in 1977, and was called to the bar by the Law Society of Alberta in 1980.

== Career ==
Moreau began her career as a lawyer practising criminal law, constitutional law, and civil litigation. Over her career she took on cases including minority language rights and Charter rights. She then became a judge in 1994.

In 2017, Moreau became the first woman to be appointed as the Chief Justice of the Court of Queen's Bench of Alberta. On October 26, 2023, Prime Minister Justin Trudeau nominated Moreau to the Supreme Court of Canada to replace Russell Brown following his resignation on June 12, 2023, following allegations of harassment. Her appointment was confirmed on November 6, 2023, creating the first female-majority in the history of the Court. She filled one of the two seats on the bench that are traditionally allotted for judges from Western Canada.

She is also a founder of the Association des juristes d'expression française de l'Alberta, a French-language rights organization.

== Judicial philosophy ==
Over her judicial career, Moreau has advocated for equal access to justice in both of Canada's official languages: English and French. As a young lawyer she won the right for Albertans to choose a criminal trial in French with a French-speaking jury, after a six-year fight ending in the Supreme Court of Canada.
