= Russell Brown (judge) =

Canadian Supreme Court Justice (born 1965)

The Honourable Russell Brown
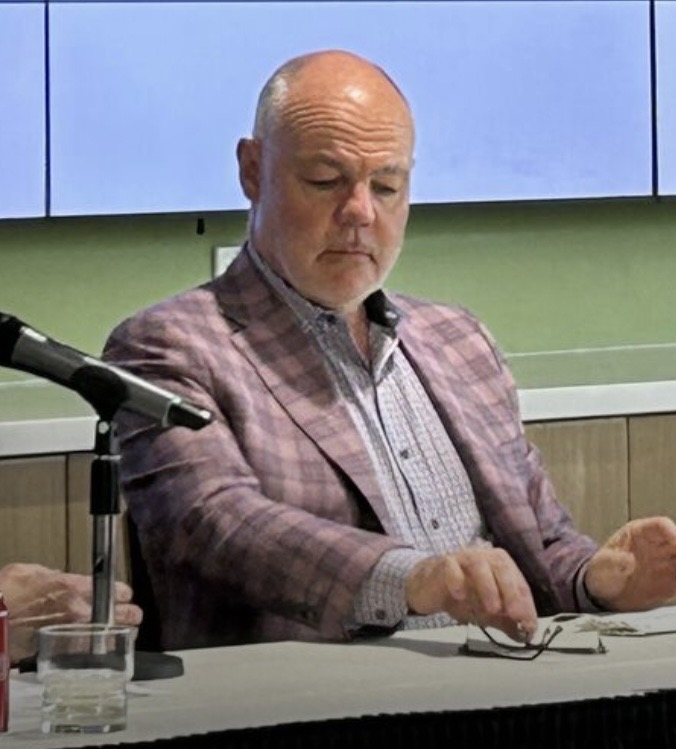
- Brown in 2025

Puisne Justice of the Supreme Court of Canada
- In office August 31, 2015 – June 12, 2023
- Nominated by: Stephen Harper
- Appointed by: David Johnston
- Preceded by: Marshall Rothstein
- Succeeded by: Mary Moreau

Personal details
- Born: September 15, 1965 (age 61) Vancouver, British Columbia, Canada
- Education: University of British Columbia (BA); University of Victoria (LLB); University of Toronto (LLM, SJD)

Russell S. Brown (born September 15, 1965) is a Canadian lawyer and former puisne justice of the Supreme Court of Canada. He was nominated by Prime Minister Stephen Harper to replace outgoing justice Marshall Rothstein and served in the role starting on August 31, 2015. Prior to his appointment to the Supreme Court, he was a justice at the Alberta Court of Appeal, and a law professor at the University of Alberta. He resigned on June 12, 2023, prior to the completion of an investigation by the Canadian Judicial Council into alleged harassment.

== Early life and education ==
Brown was born on September 15, 1965, in Vancouver, British Columbia, and was raised in the small town of Burns Lake. Growing up, he worked in his father's local hardware store, an experience he later credited with instilling a sense of community obligation and a grounded perspective on the law.

He attended the University of British Columbia, graduating with a Bachelor of Arts in 1987. He then moved to the University of Victoria for his legal education, where he was a member of the university’s rugby team. He earned his Bachelor of Laws (LLB) in 1994.

Brown later pursued advanced legal studies at the University of Toronto Faculty of Law, where he earned a Master of Laws (LLM) in 2003 and a Doctor of Juridical Science (SJD) in 2006. His graduate research formed the basis for his later authoritative work on tort law and pure economic loss.

== Career ==
=== Lawyer and professor ===
Brown was admitted to the Bar of British Columbia in 1995 and to the Bar of Alberta in 2008. From 1995 to 2004, he practiced at Davis & Company (now DLA Piper) in Vancouver. Before being appointed to the bench, he served as associate counsel to Miller Thomson LLP and was a professor and Associate Dean at the University of Alberta Faculty of Law. During his academic tenure, he was a prolific scholar in the field of tort law, specifically focusing on the intersection of private law and public authority. In 2012, he published Pure Economic Loss in Canadian Negligence Law, which became a leading authoritative text on the recovery of financial losses in tort. His research argued for an approach to liability based on corrective justice, rather than using tort law as a tool for social policy.

In 2013, he was appointed to the Court of King's Bench of Alberta. Just over a year later, in March 2014, he was elevated to the Court of Appeal of Alberta. Legal observers noted his rapid elevation—spending only 14 months at the trial court—was an indication of his intellectual weight and the Harper government's desire to appoint judges with a clear, principled judicial philosophy to higher courts. During his brief time on the Court of Appeal, he also served as a judge of the Court of Appeal for the Northwest Territories and the Court of Appeal of Nunavut.

Prior to his appointment to the bench, Brown was a frequent contributor to a University of Alberta law faculty blog, where he expressed views on various constitutional and political issues. He described the Canada Health Act as an "inappropriate [federal] intrusion into sacrosanct provincial swimming pools" and criticized third-party election spending limits as "odious" and "objectionable" restrictions on private expenditure. He also characterized human rights commissions as "puritanical functionaries" and described his own political outlook as that of a "conservative libertarian."

=== Appointment to the Supreme Court ===
Brown was nominated by Prime Minister Stephen Harper to replace retiring justice Marshall Rothstein on the Supreme Court of Canada. Brown was his eighth and final appointment to the Court, as the Conservatives would lose the 2015 election. At the time of the nomination it was expected that Harper would name someone from Saskatchewan, but Harper opted for Brown instead, who was from Alberta. This meant that there would be two appointees from Alberta (Chief Justice Beverley McLachlin was also from Alberta), however this still satisfied the constitutional convention requiring two justices from Western Canada on the Court.

His appointment proved controversial due to the surfacing of his blog posts. The Toronto Star published an article from John Whyte, a professor emeritus at the Queen’s University Faculty of Law, criticizing the appointment. Whyte called Brown unfit for the Court because of his political writings and activism, and also attacked Harper for even naming a justice so close to an election campaign. Brown would nonetheless be sworn in on August 31, 2015, and without a Parliamentary hearing as Harper had discontinued the voluntary practice with the appointment of Suzanne Côté a year prior.

The appointment of Brown has been recognized in retrospect as one of three major appointments—alongside the appointment of Côté a year earlier and the subsequent appointment of Malcolm Rowe by Justin Trudeau—which shifted the balance of the Court and ended an era of broad liberal consensus that dominated the McLachlin Court.

=== At the Supreme Court ===
Within his first year on the Court, Brown co-authored the majority opinion in the landmark case R v Jordan (2016). The decision established strict "presumptive ceilings" for trial delays, attacking a "culture of complacency" in the justice system and radically altering the application of Section 11(b) of the Charter. This focus on the rights of the accused continued in R v Le (2019), where he co-authored a majority ruling that emphasized how race and youth affect an individual's perception of police detentions.

Brown frequently authored robust dissents in criminal matters where he perceived judicial or legislative overreach. In R v JJ (2022), he criticized the constitutionality of "rape shield" laws regarding private records, arguing they infringed upon the right to make a full answer and defence. Similarly, in R v KJM (2019), he argued for even shorter delay ceilings for young offenders, and in R v Stairs (2022), he joined a dissent calling for higher standards for warrantless searches of homes during an arrest.

In 2018, Brown co-authored a high-profile dissent with Justice Suzanne Côté in Law Society of British Columbia v Trinity Western University. He argued that a "liberal and pluralist society" must accommodate religious difference, even when that difference results in unequal access to institutions.

Brown also emerged as a staunch defender of provincial jurisdiction. In the Reference re Greenhouse Gas Pollution Pricing Act (2021), he was one of three dissenters, concluding that the federal carbon price regime was an unconstitutional intrusion into exclusive provincial powers. Commentary in the National Post subsequently described Brown as an "intellectual beachhead" for a growing conservative legal movement in Canada, noting his consistent skepticism of progressive jurisprudence and judicial overreach.

==== Harassment allegations and resignation ====
In February 2023, Brown took a leave of absence from the Supreme Court following a conduct complaint being reviewed by the Canadian Judicial Council. The complaint stemmed from the events of January 28−29, 2023 at a resort in Scottsdale, Arizona. That evening, Brown delivered a speech on behalf of former Supreme Court Justice Louise Arbour, who was receiving the 2023 O'Connor Justice Prize from Arizona State University. According to the complainant in an interview with Postmedia, after being invited to join a group's table at the resort bar, he observed that Brown was allegedly intoxicated, and female members of the group later became "creeped out". The complainant said Brown allegedly tried to follow them to their room, leading the complainant to say he had punched Brown in the face repeatedly. The police report, obtained by the Postmedia reporter, notes that both parties to the altercation were under the influence of alcohol, and no criminal charges were laid. After the details of the complaint were reported, Brown issued a statement calling the allegations "demonstrably false". On June 12, Brown resigned effective immediately, ending the Council investigation.

=== Post resignation ===
Following his retirement from the Supreme Court in June 2023, Brown returned to private legal practice, specializing in commercial arbitration and mediation. In October 2023, he joined Hunter Litigation Chambers in Vancouver as Associate Counsel and became a roster member of Arbitration Place and the Western Arbitration Chambers in Calgary. His private practice focuses on complex domestic and international disputes involving commercial law, energy, and infrastructure.

In addition to his legal practice, Brown has remained active in community and advisory roles. In November 2024, he was appointed to the Greater Vancouver Advisory Board of the Salvation Army, having previously served as the chair of the organization's advisory boards in Victoria and Edmonton. He also continues to serve on the editorial board of the University of Toronto Law Journal.

== Jurisprudence ==
Justice Brown was often characterized as one of the more conservative and "originalist-leaning" members of the Wagner Court, frequently emphasizing a clear separation between judicial and executive powers. He was noted for his rigorous adherence to the text of the Constitution and his skepticism toward expansive interpretations of state power. In his concurrence in the References re Genetic Non-Discrimination Act, Brown argued that the law fell outside the federal government’s criminal law power, demonstrating his commitment to a strict division of provincial and federal jurisdictions.

Brown also played a critical role in redefining Canadian tort law and administrative law. Before his appointment, his academic work heavily criticized the "distributive justice" model of tort law, arguing instead for "corrective justice" where liability is based strictly on the relationship between the parties rather than social policy goals. On the bench, this manifested in a desire for clearer, more predictable legal rules. In his concurring reasons in Vavilov, he pushed for a robust standard of "correctness" review in administrative law to ensure that government bodies remained strictly within their statutory limits, fearing that excessive judicial deference would undermine the rule of law.

== See also ==
- Reasons of the Supreme Court of Canada by Justice Brown
