= Mahmud Jamal =

Canadian judge (born 1967)

The Honourable Mahmud Jamal

Puisne Justice of the Supreme Court of Canada
- Incumbent
- Assumed office July 1, 2021
- Nominated by: Justin Trudeau
- Appointed by: Governor in Council
- Preceded by: Rosalie Abella

Justice of the Court of Appeal for Ontario
- In office June 24, 2019 – July 1, 2021
- Nominated by: Justin Trudeau
- Appointed by: Julie Payette
- Preceded by: Gladys Pardu
- Succeeded by: Jonathon George

Personal details
- Born: July 20, 1967 (age 59) Nairobi, Kenya
- Spouse: Goleta Samari
- Children: 2
- Education: London School of Economics; Trinity College, Toronto (BA); McGill University (LLB, BCL); Yale University (LLM)
- Occupation: Lawyer, judge

Mahmud Jamal (born July 20, 1967) is a Canadian jurist serving as a puisne justice of the Supreme Court of Canada since 2021. Jamal worked as a partner at Osler, Hoskin & Harcourt and taught law at McGill University and Osgoode Hall Law School before he was appointed to the Court of Appeal for Ontario in 2019. He was nominated to the Supreme Court on June 17, 2021, taking office on July 1 to succeed Rosalie Abella. Jamal was born in Kenya to a family of Indian origin, making him the first person from a visible minority group to serve as a justice of the Supreme Court.

== Early life and education ==
Mahmud Jamal was born on July 20, 1967 in Nairobi, Kenya, to an Isma'ili family which had originally immigrated in the 19th century from Gujarat, British India, to East Africa during a railway construction boom. His family moved to England in 1969.

In 1981, his family moved again, immigrating to Canada, settling in Edmonton, Alberta, where he graduated from Ross Sheppard High School. In 1984, Jamal studied at the London School of Economics for a year and earned a bachelor of arts (B.A.) in economics from Trinity College at the University of Toronto in 1989.

After his undergraduate education, Jamal attended the McGill University Faculty of Law, graduating with a bachelor of laws (LL.B.) and bachelor of civil law (B.C.L.) in 1993. Jamal then earned a master of laws (LL.M.) from Yale Law School in 1994, which he attended as a Fulbright scholar.

== Legal career ==
Jamal completed a clerkship at Quebec Court of Appeal working for Justice Melvin Rothman and another at the Supreme Court of Canada, working for Justice Charles Gonthier. Jamal was called to the Bar of Ontario in 1996, and started working as a litigator at Osler, Hoskin & Harcourt the same year. In 2001, he became a partner at the firm, with his practice focusing on class actions and competition law. Before his appointment to the bench in 2019, Jamal was on the partnership board at Osler, and was chair of its pro bono program. He has appeared in 35 appeals before the Supreme Court, in addition to appearances to lower courts and tribunals.

In 2009, Jamal represented Imperial Oil in a Financial Services Tribunal case fighting a Financial Services Commission of Ontario order for the company to restructure its pension fund in a manner that would cost CA$16.5 million to set up and $65 million to back. Jamal represented KPMG, which was then in court over its offshore tax avoidance scheme for high-net-worth individuals involving shell corporations in the Isle of Man. In 2016, because of ongoing litigation, Jamal wrote a letter to the House of Commons Standing Committee on Finance, requesting that specifics of the case not be discussed so that it would not prejudice the ongoing case. In response, chair Wayne Easter imposed a gag order, and expert witnesses were not allowed to talk about KPMG in the next committee session.

Jamal also taught as professor of constitutional law at McGill University and administrative law at Osgoode Hall Law School. He has served stints as a director of the Canadian Civil Liberties Association, the Advocates' Society, and the Osgoode Society for Canadian Legal History. Jamal has also been a member of the Supreme Court Advocacy Institute and has served as a trustee for the Canadian Business Law Journal.

On June 24, 2019, Jamal was appointed to the Court of Appeal for Ontario on the advice of Justin Trudeau to replace Justice Gladys Pardu, who became a supernumerary judge.

=== Supreme Court ===
On June 17, 2021, he was nominated by Prime Minister Justin Trudeau to the Supreme Court of Canada, replacing Rosalie Abella, who turned 75 – the mandatory age of retirement for justices on the top court – on July 1, 2021. On that day, Jamal was sworn in as a puisne justice of the Supreme Court by Chief Justice Richard Wagner who was also acting as the administrator of the Government of Canada. A public ceremony was held in the winter of 2022. He is the first person from a visible minority group and the first Bahá’í to sit on the country's top court.

== Personal life ==
Jamal speaks English and French fluently. Originally an Isma'ili Muslim, he became a member of the Baháʼí Faith after he married his wife, Goleta (a refugee from Iran), with whom he has two children.
