= Nicholas Kasirer =

Canadian jurist (born 1960)

The Honourable Nicholas Kasirer

Puisne Justice of the Supreme Court of Canada
- Incumbent
- Assumed office September 16, 2019
- Nominated by: Justin Trudeau
- Appointed by: Julie Payette
- Preceded by: Clément Gascon

Puisne Justice of the Quebec Court of Appeal
- In office 2009 – September 15, 2019
- Nominated by: Stephen Harper
- Appointed by: David Johnston

Personal details
- Born: February 2, 1960 (age 66) Montreal, Quebec, Canada
- Relations: Arnold Heeney
- Education: University of Toronto (BA); McGill University (LLB, BCL); University of Paris 1 Pantheon-Sorbonne (DEA)

Nicholas Kasirer (born February 2, 1960) is a Canadian jurist who is serving as a puisne justice of the Supreme Court of Canada since 2019. He was sworn into office on September 16, 2019.

== Early life and education ==
Nicholas Kasirer was born in Montreal on February 2, 1960. His mother was Patricia Heeney and his father, Paul, was a medical doctor. Nicholas’s grandfather was Canadian lawyer and diplomat Arnold Heeney.

Kasirer attended Marianopolis College for his secondary studies, graduating in 1978, before matriculating at University of Toronto for his Bachelor of Arts in economics and political science, graduating in 1981.

He then went to McGill University to complete his Bachelor of Law in common and civil law, finishing his studies in 1985 and where he served as an editor for the McGill Law Journal, and where he also later served as a professor from 1989 to 2009 and dean of the Faculty from 2003 to 2009.

Kasirer also has a postgraduate diploma in international public law from Paris 1 Panthéon-Sorbonne University.

== Career ==
=== Legal career ===
After law school Kasirer was an articling student with Stikeman Elliott and then a law clerk with the Supreme Court of Canada for Justice Jean Beetz.

Kasirer was previously a puisne justice with the Quebec Court of Appeal between 2009 and 2019 during which he delivered judgments on Property Law, Contract and Civil Liability Law, Human Rights Law, Succession Law, Patrimonial Family law, Fiduciary Law, International Private Law, Land Registry, and Commercial Law.

He has written more than a dozen books on legal matters and taught classes on the law of obligations, property law, family law, and wills and estates law in both civil and common law.

=== Judge of the Supreme Court ===
On July 10, 2019, Kasirer was nominated to the Supreme Court of Canada by Prime Minister Justin Trudeau. On August 7, 2019, he was officially appointed to the Supreme Court of Canada effective as of September 16, 2019.

== Books ==
- Kasirer, Nicholas (2003), Le droit civil, avant tout un style?, Montréal, Les Éditions Themis, Canada.

== Honorary degrees ==
On September 22, 2012, the Université de Sherbrooke granted an honorary doctoral degree to Kasirer.

On June 8, 2026, the University of Ottawa granted an honorary doctoral degree to Kasirer.
