= Richard Wagner (judge) =

Chief Justice of Canada since 2017

The Right Honourable Richard Wagner PC
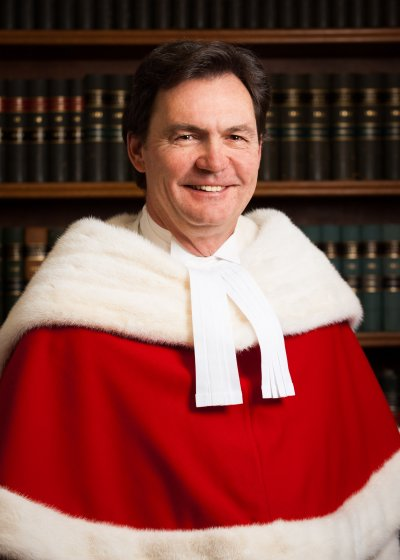
- Official portrait

18th Chief Justice of Canada
- Incumbent
- Assumed office December 18, 2017
- Nominated by: Justin Trudeau
- Appointed by: Julie Payette
- Preceded by: Beverley McLachlin

Puisne Justice of the Supreme Court of Canada
- In office October 5, 2012 – December 18, 2017
- Nominated by: Stephen Harper
- Appointed by: David Johnston
- Preceded by: Marie Deschamps
- Succeeded by: Sheilah Martin

Puisne Justice of the Quebec Court of Appeal
- In office February 3, 2011 – October 5, 2012
- Nominated by: Stephen Harper
- Appointed by: David Johnston
- Preceded by: Lise Côté
- Succeeded by: Dominique Bélanger

Personal details
- Born: April 2, 1957 (age 69) Montreal, Quebec, Canada
- Spouse: Catherine Mandeville
- Children: 2
- Parent: Claude Wagner (father)
- Education: Collège Jean-de-Brébeuf (DEC); University of Ottawa (B.Soc.Sc, LL.L.)

Richard Wagner PC (French pronunciation: [vaɡnɛʁ]; born April 2, 1957) is a Canadian jurist who has served as the 18th chief justice of Canada since 2017. He previously served as a puisne justice of the Quebec Court of Appeal (2011–2012) and of the Supreme Court of Canada (2012–2017).

== Early life and education ==
Wagner was born in Montreal, Quebec, to a French Canadian Catholic family as the son of Gisèle (née Normandeau) and Claude Wagner, a former member of Parliament and senator. He studied at the Collège Jean-de-Brébeuf in Montreal before receiving a Bachelor of Social Sciences degree in political science, cum laude, from the University of Ottawa in 1978. He received his Licentiate in Law, cum laude, from the same institution in 1979.

== Career ==
=== Private practice and early judicial career ===
In 1980, Wagner was called to the Quebec Bar, and began practice at the Montreal law firm Lavery, de Billy (formerly Lavery, O'Brien and Lavery, Johnston, Clark, Carrière, Mason & Associés). His practice centred on real estate, commercial litigation and professional liability insurance.

He was appointed to the Superior Court of Quebec for the district of Montreal on September 24, 2004. On February 3, 2011, he was elevated to the Court of Appeal of Quebec.

=== Supreme Court of Canada ===
On October 2, 2012, Prime Minister Stephen Harper nominated him to the Supreme Court of Canada to replace retiring Justice Marie Deschamps. His appointment was confirmed on October 5, 2012.

On December 3, 2012, a ceremony was held for Wagner's appointment in the Supreme Court of Canada courtroom. The event was attended by Chief Justice Beverley McLachlin, the federal minister of justice and attorney general, Rob Nicholson, and the Quebec deputy minister of justice, Nathalie Drouin.

On December 12, 2017, Prime Minister Justin Trudeau appointed Wagner as Beverly McLachlin's successor as Chief Justice of Canada.

On January 23, 2021, Wagner became Administrator of the Government of Canada following Governor General Julie Payette's resignation in response to a workplace harassment investigation. By virtue of the Letters Patent, 1947, the chief justice of Canada is the ex officio principal deputy to the governor general, and may act as governor general when the office is vacant. He ceased to hold office as administrator on July 26, 2021, following Mary Simon's appointment as governor general. Serving for six months, Wagner was the longest-serving administrator of Canada in history.

In 2023, Wagner was criticized for his handling of the complaint against puisne judge Russell Brown, which led to the latter's resignation. Brown's lawyer cast doubt on Wagner's assertion that Brown had agreed to step aside from the Court during the investigation.

In 2024, Wagner was criticized by lawyers for having a bust of himself exhibited inside the Supreme Court building. The court refused to disclose the identity of the person who paid for the bust, which raised concerns about the court's transparency. Some also said that it was improper for a sitting judge to have a bust of himself exhibited publicly.

Wagner was also criticized for excessive foreign travel as chief justice, as well as overstepping the court's constitutional role.

== Personal life ==
Wagner is a Roman Catholic. Wagner's father Claude was also a jurist. His grandfather was a German Jewish immigrant originally from Bavaria. Wagner has two children who are also lawyers.

== Honours ==
=== Honorary degrees ===
Date	School	Degree
June 19, 2019	University of Ottawa	Doctorate
June 14, 2023	Law Society of Ontario	Doctorate
June 12, 2025	University of Western Ontario	Doctorate
November 24, 2025	Université du Québec à Chicoutimi	Doctorate

== See also ==
- Reasons of the Supreme Court of Canada by Chief Justice Wagner

Order of precedence
Preceded by Mark Carney as Prime Minister	Order of Precedence of Canada as Chief Justice	Succeeded by Edward Schreyer as Former Governor General
