= Sheilah Martin =

Canadian judge (born 1956)

The Honourable Sheilah Martin
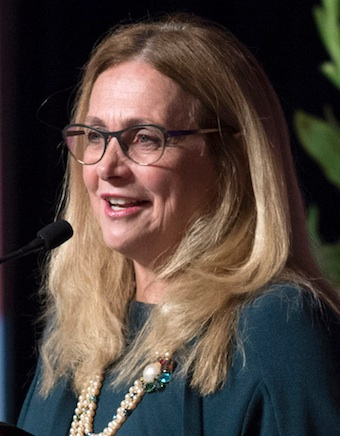
- Martin in 2018

Puisne Justice of the Supreme Court of Canada
- In office December 18, 2017 – May 30, 2026
- Nominated by: Justin Trudeau
- Appointed by: Julie Payette
- Preceded by: Richard Wagner
- Succeeded by: Glenn Joyal

Justice of Appeal of the Court of Appeal of Alberta
- In office June 17, 2016 – December 18, 2017
- Nominated by: Justin Trudeau
- Appointed by: David Johnston
- Preceded by: Clifton D. O'Brien
- Succeeded by: Jolaine Antonio

Personal details
- Born: May 31, 1956 (age 70) Montreal, Quebec, Canada
- Education: McGill University (LLB, BCL); University of Alberta (LLM); University of Toronto (SJD)

Sheilah L. Martin (born May 31, 1956) is a retired Canadian jurist, who served as a puisne justice of the Supreme Court of Canada from 2017 to 2026. She was nominated to the court by Prime Minister Justin Trudeau on November 29, 2017. Before her appointment to Canada's highest court, Martin had served on the Court of Appeal of Alberta, the Court of Appeal for the Northwest Territories, and the Court of Appeal of Nunavut since 2016, and the Court of Queen's Bench of Alberta from 2005 to 2016.

== Early life and education ==
Martin was born and raised in Montreal. She earned a Bachelor of Civil Law and a Bachelor of Common Law from McGill University in 1981. She then moved to Alberta to pursue her career. Martin was called to the Alberta Bar in 1989, and mainly practiced in the province till her call to the highest court in the country.

Martin earned a Master of Laws from the University of Alberta in 1983. Between 1982 and 1986, she worked as a researcher and law professor at the University of Calgary. Martin earned her Doctorate of Juridical Science from the University of Toronto in 1991. She then served as acting dean and then permanent dean of the University of Calgary's Faculty of Law from 1991 to 1996.

== Career ==
=== Early legal career ===
Martin practiced corporate, commercial, criminal, and constitutional law from 1996 until she left Code Hunter LLP after her appointment as a judge in 2005. She also worked pro bono for the Women’s Legal Education and Action Fund (LEAF) and the Alberta Association of Sexual Assault Centres in cases that reached the Supreme Court. Martin also worked on the Indian Residential Schools Settlement Agreement, and on the team that won compensation in the wrongful conviction case of David Milgaard.

Martin appeared before the Supreme Court of Canada three times, for LEAF in Winnipeg Child and Family Services (Northwest Area) v G(DF) and R v Shearing, as well as for the Alberta Association of Sexual Assault Centres in R v Mills.

Over the years, Martin has received numerous awards, including the Distinguished Service Award for Legal Scholarship, the Law Society of Alberta’s Certificate of Merit, and the YWCA’s Advancement of Women Award.

=== Court of King’s Bench and Court of Appeal of Alberta ===
In 2005, Martin was appointed as judge to the Court of Queen’s Bench of Alberta in Calgary. Since 2009, she had also served as a deputy judge for the Supreme Court of Yukon. As a trial judge, she was one of the first judges in Canada to permit court journalists to use instant messaging in the courtroom while proceedings were ongoing.

In March 2016, Martin issued the first judicial approval in Canada for a person requesting assisted death after the Supreme Court's decision in Carter v Canada (AG). She allowed the assisted death for a woman diagnosed with amyotrophic lateral sclerosis, and held the hearing closed to the public and media to respect her privacy. Martin decided that statements in support of the application from two doctors were sufficient, a decision which rejected guidelines from the Supreme Court of British Columbia and the Ontario Superior Court of Justice that more statements were required. Martin also held that no psychiatric assessment on the day of death was necessary, and that the applicant's request should not fail on technical or legalistic grounds. Martin also ruled that the ruling would apply across Canada, which allowed the applicant to travel out of province in order to fulfill her wish of assisted death.

In June 2016, Martin was appointed by Prime Minister Trudeau to the Court of Appeal of Alberta, the Court of Appeal for the Northwest Territories, and the Court of Appeal of Nunavut.

=== Supreme Court ===
Martin was appointed to the Supreme Court of Canada by Prime Minister Justin Trudeau on December 18, 2017. In January 2026, Martin announced that she would step down from the bench effective May 30.

== Personal life ==
Martin was married to Hersh Wolch, a defence lawyer she met at a law conference, from 2000 until his death in 2017.
