= Malcolm Rowe =

Puisne justice of the Supreme Court of Canada

The Honourable Malcolm Rowe
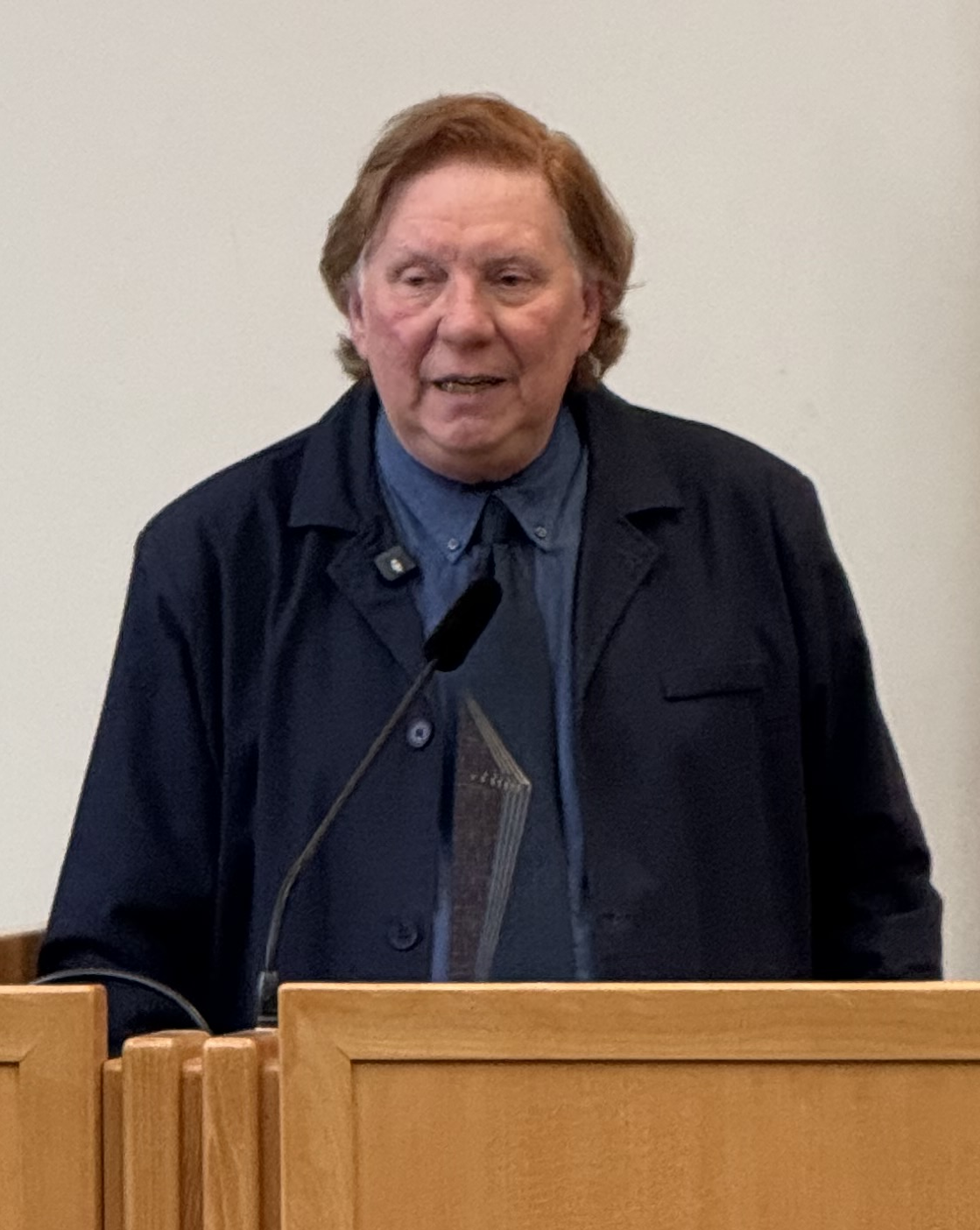
- Rowe in 2025

Puisne Justice of the Supreme Court of Canada
- Incumbent
- Assumed office October 28, 2016
- Nominated by: Justin Trudeau
- Appointed by: David Johnston
- Preceded by: Thomas Cromwell

Personal details
- Born: June 27, 1953 (age 73) St. John’s, Newfoundland, Canada
- Education: Memorial University of Newfoundland (BA, BSc); Osgoode Hall Law School (LLB)

Malcolm Rowe (born June 27, 1953) is a Canadian who has served as a puisne justice of the Supreme Court of Canada since 2016. Rowe is the first judge from Newfoundland and Labrador to sit on the Supreme Court.

== Early life and education ==
Rowe was born on June 27, 1953 in St. John’s, Newfoundland and Labrador, to parents who grew up in the province's small fishing communities.

Rowe attended Memorial University of Newfoundland, where he earned a Bachelor of Science and a Bachelor of Arts in political science. He studied at York University's Osgoode Hall Law School from 1975–78 and graduated with a Bachelor of Laws.

== Career ==
Rowe was called to the bar by the Law Society of Newfoundland and Labrador in 1978 and The Law Society of Upper Canada (Ontario) in 1986.

Before becoming a judge, Rowe worked in the Canadian foreign service. He also started his own private practice in Ottawa that focused on Canadian constitutional law, foreign affairs, and arbitration over maritime boundaries. He was an adviser for Progressive Conservative cabinet minister John Crosbie and Liberal MP Brian Tobin, and served as secretary to Newfoundland and Labrador's cabinet after Tobin returned as premier.

He was appointed to the Supreme Court of Newfoundland and Labrador (Trial Division) in 1999. He was elevated to the Supreme Court of Newfoundland and Labrador (Court of Appeal) in 2001, where he served for 16 years.

Rowe also taught public and constitutional law as a lecturer at the University of Ottawa for two years.

=== Supreme Court of Canada ===
Rowe was nominated by Prime Minister Justin Trudeau in October 2016 to sit on the Supreme Court of Canada, succeeding Justice Thomas Cromwell who retired that September. Rowe is the first judge from Newfoundland and Labrador to sit on the Supreme Court. Rowe's appointment was the result of a process newly instituted by Trudeau in which any jurist in Canada was invited to apply to a seven-member committee headed by former Progressive Conservative Prime Minister Kim Campbell. Rowe's appointment to the court was effective October 28, 2016, and he was formally sworn in at a private ceremony on October 31, 2016.

In March 2021, the Supreme Court found that the federal government's carbon price regime is constitutional. Rowe was one of three dissenting justices. He concluded that the federal government's carbon price law was unconstitutional because it interfered with areas of exclusive provincial jurisdiction.

== Personal life ==
Rowe was married to Moya Greene, with whom he has a daughter.
