= FCP =

FCP or fcp may refer to:

== Organisations ==
- Federation of Pentecostal Churches (Italy) (Italian: Federazione delle Chiese Pentecostali)
- Fellow of the College of Preceptors
- Fellow of the American College of Clinical Pharmacology
- Ferrocarril del Pacífico, a defunct Mexican railroad
- First Calgary Petroleums, a Canadian oil and gas company

=== Politics ===
- Family Coalition Party of Ontario, a defunct political party in Canada
- Federation of Christian Populars, a defunct political party in Italy
- Forward Communist Party, a defunct political party in India
- French Communist Party, a French political party

== Sport ==
- 1. FC Passau, a German football club
- FC Penzberg, a German football club
- 1. FC Pforzheim, a German football club
- FC Pocheon, a South Korean football club
- FC Porto, a Portuguese football club
- Full-court press, in basketball
- FC Prishtina, a Kosovar football club
- FC Paris and FC Paris (women), French football clubs

== Science and technology ==
- Fibre Channel Protocol, a data transfer mechanism
- Final Cut Pro, video editing software
- Florid cutaneous papillomatosis, a syndrome

== Other uses ==
- Family-centered practices
- Federal Contractors' Program, a program of the Canadian federal government
- First Canadian Place, a building in Toronto, Ontario, Canada
- Fonds commun de placement, a European collective investment scheme
- Forward commitment procurement
- Free-choice profiling
- Front controller pattern

== See also ==
- Foolscap (disambiguation)
