= Federal Contractors' Program =

In Canada, the Federal Contractors' Program (FCP) is administered by Employment and Social Development Canada, an agency of the Canadian federal government. The FCP requires provincially regulated employers with 100 or more employees bidding on federal contracts of $1,000,000 (originally $200,000) or more to certify that they will implement employment equity measures. The FCP was created by a 1986 decision of the federal cabinet, not through legislation.

Because the FCP is occasionally confused with the provisions of the Canadian Employment Equity Act, the latter is often referred to as Legislated Employment Equity to distinguish it from the FCP. The FCP is limited to provincially regulated suppliers to the federal government (with the above-described limits). In contrast, the Canadian Employment Equity Act covers only federally regulated organizations such as railways, airlines, telecommunication firms, banks, etc., regardless of whether they are suppliers to the federal government.

However, there are parallels between the two programs. Both FCP and Legislated Employment Equity mandate proactive treatment by employers to increase the representation of four specified groups in the workforce: Women, visible minorities, Aboriginal (Indigenous) peoples, and people with disabilities. For both FCP and Legislated Employment Equity, the programs' roots can be traced back to the 1984 Abella commission, chaired by Judge Rosalie Abella.

== See also ==
- Employment equity (Canada)
- Employment and Social Development Canada
- Visible minority
