= Global majority =

Ethnic groups of the majority global population

"Global majority" is a collective term for people of African, Asian, indigenous, Latin American, or mixed-heritage backgrounds, who constitute approximately 75 percent of the global population. It has been used as an alternative to terms that are seen as racialized, such as "ethnic minority" and "person of color" (POC), or more regional terms, including "visible minority" in Canada and "Black, Asian and Minority Ethnic" (BAME) in the United Kingdom.

== Terminology ==
The term was used as early as 2003 as a way to challenge the normativity of a white majority or Eurocentric perspective, through Rosemary Campbell-Stephens' work on leadership preparation within the school sector. Its proponents argue that such terms as "ethnic minority" marginalize the skills, the ways of thinking, and the lived experiences of those from African, Asian, indigenous, Latin American, or mixed-heritage backgrounds. Collectively, these groups are said to constitute 75 percent of the global population. Therefore, terms such as ethnic minority, person of color, visible minority, and BAME were criticized as racializing ethnicity.

The term "global majority" has been challenged for not including white ethnic groups that are cultural minorities in white majority societies, such as white Irish, white Jews, and Travellers in the United Kingdom. It is also seen as using "majority" out of context and, thereby, distorting language.

== By country ==
=== Canada ===
The term visible minority is a legal term used in different sectors of the Canadian government, and has been defined by the Employment Equity Act as "someone (other than an Indigenous person...) who is non-white in colour/race, regardless of place of birth." The term is likewise used by Statistics Canada, although it is currently under consultative review.

In certain parts of Canada, among them Vancouver and Toronto, "visible minorities" make up the majority of the population. Advocates of "global majority" argue that the term "visible minority" creates a racialized group, in contrast with the white Canadian population.

=== United Kingdom ===
In the midst of the 2020 Black Lives Matter protests in the United Kingdom, there was a growing debate around how best to describe different ethnic groups. This led to the creation of the UK government "Commission on Race and Ethnic Disparities", which concluded in March 2021 that the term BAME was "unhelpful and redundant".

In 2020, the Church of England created an Archbishops' Anti-Racism Taskforce to examine racism in the church. At the time, it primarily used the term "United Kingdom Minority Ethnic" (UKME). When the taskforce's report was published in April 2021, it chose a broader description of "United Kingdom Minority Ethnic/Global Majority Heritage" (UKME/GMH) as more appropriate than BAME. According to Karlene Kerr, the language of "Global Majority Heritage" is seen as a reminder that minorities often come from a majority culture before migrating to the UK. Writing in The Critic, Charles Wide objects to the church's use of the term, suggesting it is associated with critical race and intersectional theories.

In November 2022, the Labour-run Westminster City Council committed to replace BAME with "global majority". In response, Conservative MP John Hayes said, "Minorities and majorities are about the context — you can't use the term 'majority' out of context and assume it affords some sort of accurate description". He added that the change was part of the "liberal left agenda", was "deeply sinister", and "must be resisted at every turn".

=== United States ===
In the United States, the term "global majority" has been used since the early-2000s as a way to refer to developing countries. Organizations such as the "Global Majority", founded by California senator Bill Monning, focus on non-violent conflict resolution with respect to global disputes. Likewise, the American University in Washington, DC offers a general education undergraduate course on the subject that focuses on developing countries. Since 2010, the American University has published a student Global Majority E-Journal connected to this course.

However, since the COVID-19 pandemic, the term has been used as a way to speak about racism in the United States. Some prefer the term over "person of color", as the latter focuses on a historical binary between African Americans as "colored people" and "color-free white people", thereby emphasizing race and white centrality. "Global majority" has been seen as a way to highlight race-related psychological processes and to place greater emphasis on less prominent voices in white-dominated spaces.

== See also ==
- British East and Southeast Asian
- Diversity (politics)
- Majority World
- Third World
