= Public private dialogue =

Dialogue between the public sector and the private sector

A public–private dialogue (PPD) is a dialogue between the public sector and the private sector. More specifically, PPD is a process, which might include competitiveness partnerships, investors’ advisory councils, presidential investment councils, business forums, water forums, public-private alliances, state-business relations, public-private collaboration, reform coalitions, etc, aiming at improvement of government policies. However, the essence of modern PPD is not the policy outcome as such, but rather establishment of a viable process and framework to permit the collaboration between government and business and so PPD is generally understood as improvement of economic and industrial policies in the third world countries. Simply, through PPD can policymakers and business experts accurately determine the spot for reforms. Moreover, PPD enables stakeholders to address state and market collective action problems.

== Alternative definitions ==
1. PPD defines some of the rules of the game governing the interaction between the private sector and the state. These rules are both formal (dialogue procedures) and substantive (agreements and commitments). From this point of view, PPD is a co-ordination mechanism consisting of an exchange system based on the possibility of mutual gains, as opposed to means of co-ordination based on a threat system or an integrative system.
2. PPD is a platform for interaction between state and private sector, and is hence an organization (which can be very informal or very institutionalized).

== Benefits of PPD ==
Private contribution to dialogue improves the quality of business representation and supplements the performance of democratic institutions, which helps with building trust and understanding between the governments and private sector by diversifying of sources of information and promoting the evidence-based policy. On the top of that, PPD platforms have proven their ability to save money. In 2009, World Bank Group (WBG) analyzed approximately 30 PPDs, which have taken place in over 50 different areas and saved more than $400 million in private sector.

The most beneficial PPDs arise between a particular industry or value chain in the private sector and those in government responsible for regulating that area of the economy, as they provide more focus and opportunities for action. Although this could seem as a form of industrial policy, PPD emphasize local ownership and leadership, encourage firms to cooperate and identify areas for sector development.

== Risks of PPD ==
PPD creates many opportunities, but if the communication between government and society is weak, it also creates many risks. It may lead to rent-seeking behaviour, if not sufficiently transparent. Moreover, if small and medium enterprises are not included in the dialogue, PPD can be dominated by big business and by capital city-based businesses, being monopolized by powerful lobbies to block reforms and to maintain existing status quo. Poorly planned and unfocused dialogue might degenerate into a talking shop, loss of credibility and may significantly slow down the reform process. However, PPD might also become too focused with one individual, leading to one-man show, which stands and falls on the key person interest. Another challenge raises from differences between government (public institutions) and private sector. Different norms and ideology might make it fairly impossible to match both systems together, leading to weakening of democratic decision-making and politicization of the whole dialogue. Last, but not least is the "free rider" problem: this refers to difficulty of persuading people to join a group, when the benefits accrue to members are non-members alike.

== Practical Examples ==
- Egypt (1998) - In 1998, the citrus export in Egypt grew only with adding of new harvest areas. Once the Horticultural Export Improvement Association was introduced, the public private dialogue led to taking the full advantage of existing land. As a result, the Egyptian citrus sector was increased by 1400% between the years 2000 and 2008.
- Nepal (2008) - The Nepal Business Forum, formed in 2008, played a significant role (according to WBG's Independent Evaluation Group), in upcoming private sector reforms in a country struggling to establish democracy, which led to more than $5.5 million cost savings.
- Pakistan (2009) - The Rawalpindi Chamber of Commerce and Industry (RCCI) has been organizing the All-Pakistan Chamber Presidents' Conference on an annual basis since 2009. This event represents an opportunity for the business community from across Pakistan to discuss issues and to propose reforms for business to grow. Moreover, the local think tank Policy Research Institute of Market Economy (PRIME) developed a scorecard for tracking and for the evaluation of the government's progress in implementing promises.

== See also ==
- Forward Commitment Procurement
- Public-private partnership
