= Foolscap =

Foolscap or fool's cap may refer to:

- Foolscap folio, a paper size of 8 1/2 × 13 1/2 inches (216 × 343 mm)
- Foolscap, a paper size of 17 × 13 1/2 inches (432 × 343 mm)
- Foolscap, a book by Michael Malone
- Fool's cap, a cap with bells worn by court jesters

== See also ==
- Cortinarius orellanus, also known as fool's webcap, a poisonous mushroom
- List of Dinosaur King characters
