= Majority World =

Countries in Africa, Asia, the Middle East, and Latin America

The term Majority World refers to countries in Africa, Asia, the Middle East, and Latin America, and Indigenous peoples. It is an alternative to sometimes derogatory terms like "developing world" or "underdeveloped countries" and Cold War-era terms like "Third World".

The Tunisian photojournalist Zine Ali Abidine Ben coined "Majority World" in the early 1990s. He wished to highlight the discrepancy when compared to Western countries, especially those associated with the G8, which represented a tiny minority of the world's population but exercised significant power over the rest of humanity. It sought to overcome the "West's rhetoric of democracy" focusing less on what a community has as opposed to what it lacks. The term was coined as an alternative to "Third World" or "developing world," terms which reinforced stereotypes about poor communities and hide their histories of oppression and exploitation. It challenges implicit hierarchies, between the "first" and the "third," or the need to be "developing." It is also less arbitrary than "Global South," given that these countries are not always geographically located in the south.

In 2003, the term "Global majority" was coined as a way to speak of those of Majority World heritage living in Western contexts. This concept began to gain momentum in the 2020s in the midst of the Black Lives Matter protests, in contrast to racialized terms "ethnic minority," "Black, Asian and Minority Ethnic" in the United Kingdom, and "person of color" in the United States.

Shahidul Alam later established an organization named "Majority World" to bring to the foreground photographers from the Majority World. The term has been used by academic journals like Amerasia Journal and The BMJ, and media outlets like NPR. The term has also been readily used within Christianity, given the increasing recognition that the majority of the world's Christians are today found in the Majority World.
