= Abella commission =

Canadian royal commission

Royal Commission on Equality in Employment
- Also known as: Abella Commission
- Commissioner: Rosalie Abella
- Inquiry period: 24 June 1983 – October 1984

The Abella commission, officially the Royal Commission on Equality in Employment, was a Canadian federal royal commission headed by Rosalie Abella in 1983 to 1984.

Abella was the commission's sole commissioner. When she was appointed by Lloyd Axworthy, then the federal minister of employment and immigration, she was a family court judge in Ontario. The commission was charged with examining the employment practices of eleven federal Crown corporations, understood as exemplars of workplace conditions, with particular focus on women, Indigenous people, disabled people, and visible minorities. Its terms of reference required it to "inquire into the most efficient, effective, and equitable means of promoting employment opportunities, eliminating systemic discrimination, and assisting all individuals to compete for employment opportunities on an equal basis".

The commission's report was released in 1984. Abella wrote all of it, except for a section dealing with statistics.

The Abella commission developed the idea of employment equity and inspired the federal Employment Equity Act, which was passed in 1986 by the 33rd Canadian Parliament under Prime Minister Brian Mulroney. The report was grounded in the idea, expressed among other places in the American Supreme Court decision Griggs v. Duke Power Co., that discriminatory actions should be understood in terms of their impact, not in terms of people's intention. It endorsed an expansive concept of equality, according to which equality may sometimes mean treating people the same, while it may also mean treating people differently. Among other recommendations, the report suggested that the federal government create mandatory employment equity programmes in Crown and other corporations that showed evidence of systemic employment discrimination.

== Sources ==
- Abu-Laban, Yasmeen; Gabriel, Christina (2002). Selling Diversity: Immigration, Multiculturalism, Employment Equity, and Globalization. Broadview Press. ISBN 1-55111-398-8. OCLC 49844847.
- Agócs, Carol (2014). "The Making of the Abella Report: Reflections on the Thirtieth Anniversary of the Report of the Royal Commission on Equality in Employment". In Agócs, Carol (ed.). Employment Equity in Canada: The Legacy of the Abella Report. University of Toronto Press. ISBN 978-1-4426-6851-5. JSTOR 10.3138/j.ctt7zwc0n. OCLC 887803669.
