= Employment equity (Canada) =

Canadian law for equitable employment

Employment Equity Act

Parliament of Canada
- Long title: An Act respecting employment equity
- Royal assent: December 15, 1995
- Commenced: October 24, 1996
- Status: Current legislation

Employment equity, as defined in federal Canadian law by the Employment Equity Act (French: Loi sur l’équité en matière d’emploi), requires federal jurisdiction employers to engage in proactive employment practices to increase the representation of four designated groups: women, people with disabilities, visible minorities, and Aboriginal peoples. The act states that "employment equity means more than treating persons the same way but also requires special measures and the accommodation of differences".

The act requires that employers remove barriers to employment that disadvantage members of the four designated groups. Employers are required to institute positive policies for the hiring, training, retention, and promotion of members of the designated groups. Examples of positive policies include recruitment in Indigenous communities, job advertisements in minority-language newspapers, or an apprentice program directed toward people with disabilities.

== History ==
The roots of employment equity are in the 1984 Abella commission, chaired by Judge Rosalie Abella. She considered a U.S. term, "affirmative action", but decided not to use it because of the emotions and ill will surrounding affirmative action. In its place she created the term "employment equity" for the Canadian context. Abella's report later became the foundation of the Employment Equity Act of 1986, later amended as the Employment Equity Act of 1995. The purpose of the act, as stated in the legislation itself, is:

The purpose of this Act is to achieve equality in the workplace so that no person shall be denied employment opportunities or benefits for reasons unrelated to ability and, in the fulfillment of that goal, to correct the conditions of disadvantage in employment experienced by women, aboriginal peoples, persons with disabilities and members of visible minorities by giving effect to the principle that employment equity means more than treating persons in the same way but also requires special measures and the accommodation of differences.

== Designated groups ==
The Employment Equity Act designates four groups as the beneficiaries of employment equity:

1. Women
2. People with disabilities
3. Aboriginal peoples, a category consisting of Status Indians, Non-status Indians, Métis (people of mixed Indigenous-French ancestry in western Canada), and Inuit (the Indigenous people of the Arctic). The term "Indigenous" is now preferred, although the actual wording of the law uses "Aboriginal".
4. Visible minorities The term "racialized persons" is now preferred, although the actual wording of the law uses "visible minorities".

== Coverage ==
The Employment Equity Act is federal legislation, and as such, applies only to a narrow group of industries that are federally regulated under the Canadian constitution: banks, broadcasters, telecommunication companies, railroads, airlines, private businesses necessary to the operation of a federal act, maritime transportation companies, other transportation companies if inter-provincial in nature, uranium-related organizations, federal crown corporations, and corporations controlled by two or more provincial governments. Overall, federal employment equity legislation covers 10% of the Canadian workforce. Thus the scope of the Employment Equity Act is quite limited, and the vast majority of employers, including nearly all retailers and manufacturing companies, fall outside its jurisdiction.

The Canadian federal government also administers the Federal Contractors' Program (FCP). This is not under the Employment Equity Act, but rather is a non-legislated program that extends employment equity to organizations beyond the scope of the act that provide eligible goods and services to the federal government. The FCP states that suppliers of goods and services to the federal government (with some specified exceptions) must have an employment equity program in place.

Some provinces use the term "employment equity" in conjunction with their enforcement of provincial-level human rights legislation (for example, British Columbia). The government of Quebec requires that employers show preference to people with disabilities, which could be considered a form of employment equity. However, while every province has human rights legislation to prohibit discrimination against women and various minorities, no province has a law that is an analogue to the federal Employment Equity Act.

== Regulatory oversight ==
Oversight of employment equity is shared among three federal government agencies. For private sector employers that are federally regulated, Employment and Social Development Canada collects data from employers and conducts research related to the Employment Equity Act. The Treasury Board Secretariat oversees the administration of employment equity in the federal government itself. The Canadian Human Rights Commission deals with both private and public sector employers that are federally regulated, and is responsible for conducting audits of employers' compliance.

In addition to the above, Employment and Social Development Canada is responsible for oversight of the Federal Contractors' Program.

== Employment Equity Task Force ==
The Employment Equity Task Force (ETF) has been used to refer to two distinct review panels convened by the federal government of Canada, both intended to evaluate the operation of the Employment Equity Act and provide advice on improving its application and efficacy in federally regulated workplaces. These two independent panels, each commissioned by the Government of Canada and each charged with finding ways to address barriers and to improve the application of equity employment in the federal workplace, are both chaired by distinguished scholars from the field of equity and law (Professor Carol Agócs in 2006, and Dr. Adelle Blackett in 2023) and their reports are currently being used as primary reference documents to inform national equity and inclusion policy.

== History ==
The Employment Equity Act was originally passed by the Parliament of Canada in 1986, and was amended in 1995. It is aimed at achieving equality in the workplace so that no person shall be denied an employment opportunity or benefit for reasons unrelated to ability, and applies to federally regulated employers, which includes the federal public service, Crown corporations, and certain parts of the private sector, including banking, telecommunications, and transportation. The federal government has, on multiple occasions, engaged independent task forces to assess and to evaluate whether the Act is meeting its original goals. The 2006 Employment Equity Task Force, which was led by Professor Carol Agócs, undertook a review of the impacts of the Act over its first 10 years of application, finding systemic barriers that were not being addressed in the existing legislative and regulatory framework. A new Employment Equity Act Review Task Force was commissioned in 2021, and was charged with finding ways to bring the existing framework up to date and in line with modern standards for equity, diversity, inclusion, accessibility, and anti-racism. The panel was led by Dr. Adelle Blackett. Their reports, Modernizing the Act to Achieve Real Results (2006) and A Transformative Framework to Achieve and Sustain Employment Equity (2023), have been used to inform current and ongoing federal policy development.

== Controversy ==
Employment equity is surrounded with controversy, as has occurred with similar programs in the U.S. and other countries. Opponents of employment equity argue that it violates common-sense notions of fairness and equality. Economists Cristina Echavarria and Mobinul Huq propose that employment equity be redesigned so that employers are required to remove barriers to men applying for female-dominated jobs, as well as barriers to women applying for male-dominated jobs.

On the other hand, proponents maintain that employment equity is necessary to amend historic wrongs and to ameliorate the economic differences among groups. A particular point of contention has been the category visible minorities, which lumps together numerous ethnic groups, some of whom are affluent and some of whom are severely disadvantaged.

Some argue that the act should have been stricter. Others have argued that employment equity should rely more on moral suasion rather than legal remedies. Among those who argue for strictness, the act has been criticized as an example of "soft-law", meaning token penalties combined with an overly casual use of compliance statistics. Other researchers have argued for a more conciliatory approach based on self-regulation, employee participation, and appeals to employers’ sense of self-interest. Some have also contended that employment equity is in conflict with the Canadian Human Rights Act which prohibits discrimination on the basis of gender, race, ethnicity, and certain other grounds, since biasing hiring practices to prefer designated groups is necessarily discriminatory against non-designated groups. However, the equality section of the Canadian Charter of Rights and Freedoms explicitly permits (but does not require) affirmative action type legislation. Subsection 2 of Section 15 states that the equality provisions do "not preclude any law, program or activity that has as its object the amelioration of conditions of disadvantaged individuals or groups including those that are disadvantaged because of race, national or ethnic origin, colour, religion, sex, age or mental or physical disability."

In July 2010, controversy arose when a Caucasian woman, Sara Landriault, was barred from applying for employment in a federal agency because she was not in a racial minority. This incident led Stockwell Day, then president of the Treasury Board of Canada, to announce a review of employment equity.

== Distinct from other human rights concepts ==
Section 15 of the Canadian Charter of Rights and Freedoms states in Subsection (1) that, "Every individual is equal before and under the law and has the right to the equal protection and equal benefit of the law without discrimination and, in particular, without discrimination based on race, national or ethnic origin, colour, religion, sex, age or mental or physical disability." Subsection (2) states that "Subsection (1) does not preclude any law, program or activity that has as its object the amelioration of conditions of disadvantaged individuals or groups including those that are disadvantaged because of race, national or ethnic origin, colour, religion, sex, age or mental or physical disability."

The Canadian Human Rights Act has long prohibited discrimination on the basis of gender, race, ethnicity, and certain other grounds. The Canadian Human Rights Act continues to be in force alongside the Employment Equity Act. The key distinction between the two laws is that the Canadian Human Rights Act merely prohibits discrimination, whereas the Employment Equity Act requires employers to engage in proactive measures to improve the employment opportunities of the four specific groups listed above. Note that the Canadian Human Rights Act protects a wider range of minorities (such as sexual minorities and religious minorities), while the Employment Equity Act limits its coverage to the aforementioned four protected groups. In Canada, employment equity is a specific legal concept, and should not be used as a synonym for non-discrimination or workplace diversity.

Employment equity should not be confused with pay equity, which is an entirely distinct concept. Pay equity, as a Canadian legal term, refers to the legal requirement that predominantly female occupations be paid the same as predominantly male occupations of equal importance within a given organization.

One way of understanding the distinction between employment equity and pay equity (comparable worth) is to note that they take different approaches to dealing with the problem of predominantly female occupations being underpaid. Employment equity aims to increase the number of women in well-paid occupations. In contrast, pay equity implicitly recognizes how difficult it is to integrate predominantly male occupations, and instead aims to increase the pay of predominantly female occupations. Employment equity addresses the situation of Indigenous peoples, visible minorities, and people with disabilities, whereas pay equity addresses solely the dilemma that predominantly female occupations tend to be underpaid.
