= Family-centered practices =

Variety of different tools for child development

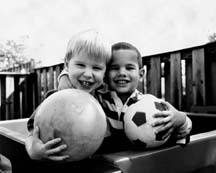

Family-centered practices (FCPs) use a variety of different tools for child development, where the development, provision, and assessment of healthcare is equally constructive to both children and their families. FCP is valuable to clients of all children and can be applied in many different healthcare settings.

== Description ==
FCP uses different types of implementations such as intervention planning, providing learning opportunities and information, teaching interaction skills, delivering family therapy sessions, and teaching non-judgment and the positives of non-judgment. To make FCPs successful, it is important to learn about the family system and to properly assess the intervention that respects the participating family.

Family centered practices can be used for many different situations. They can be used for cases such as child abuse and/or neglect. Using the FCP approach may be difficult in the case of caregivers who do not see a need for change. When trials of family centered practices were used by the Washington State Social and Health Services, 6% of all participants were deemed to have success and see change. In those trials, circumstances, where children had been removed from their home and placed into another home (i.e. foster care or group home), were taken into account.

== Background ==
The idea of FCP came from Dr John Sullivan, at the Institute for Family Centered Services. Sullivan's goal was to show families that they were important and influential in a child's life. Interventions were designed to assist families in degrading situations. Participants were taught positive peer culture, and the importance of each individual's dignity, respect, and skill. The first participants were brought to the attention of John Sullivan from the Juvenile Justice system. After success was shown, the Family and Children's Social Services began to participate. By 1989, there were multiple organizations using FCP techniques. By the 2000s, the practice had spread to nearly every U.S. state and the idea became a normal intervention in the lives of troubled, abused, neglected, and maltreated children and their families.

== Applications ==
FCP focuses on the family as the primary unit of attention while encouraging strength, respect, and support within the family. Instructors are most often social workers. They begin their work by evaluating the family with the child/children and the family without the child/children. The goal from the evaluation is to build consistent, ethical, and effective child welfare practice within the family. Once the evaluation step is complete, the instructor focuses on building a program in conjunction with the family, rather than simply dictating one. This ensures that the caregivers maintain authority and improve program results. The program concludes after a set period of time, that is usually set by the court or social worker, depending on the severity of the child's case.

In developed countries, such as Australia, most hospital settings claim to be family-centered. This means the hospitals have implemented an attitude where they believe that parents are essential to their child's well-being, and therefore crucial to the decision-making process regarding their health.

== Effectiveness ==
After consultations with FCPs, the results in families differ, as no two families are the same. Each family has its own beliefs and values, which the social worker must take into account while helping create a program designed for them. After the evaluation step, if the social worker was able to find out the severity of the child's maltreatment, the goal has been met. Even if use of an FCP is not continued, other steps can be taken to provide for the safety and well-being of the child.

== See also ==
- Child Protective Services
- National Association of Social Workers
- Safeguarding
- Foster Care
