= Visible minority =

Canadian demographic category

Percentage of visible minorities by census division (2021 census)

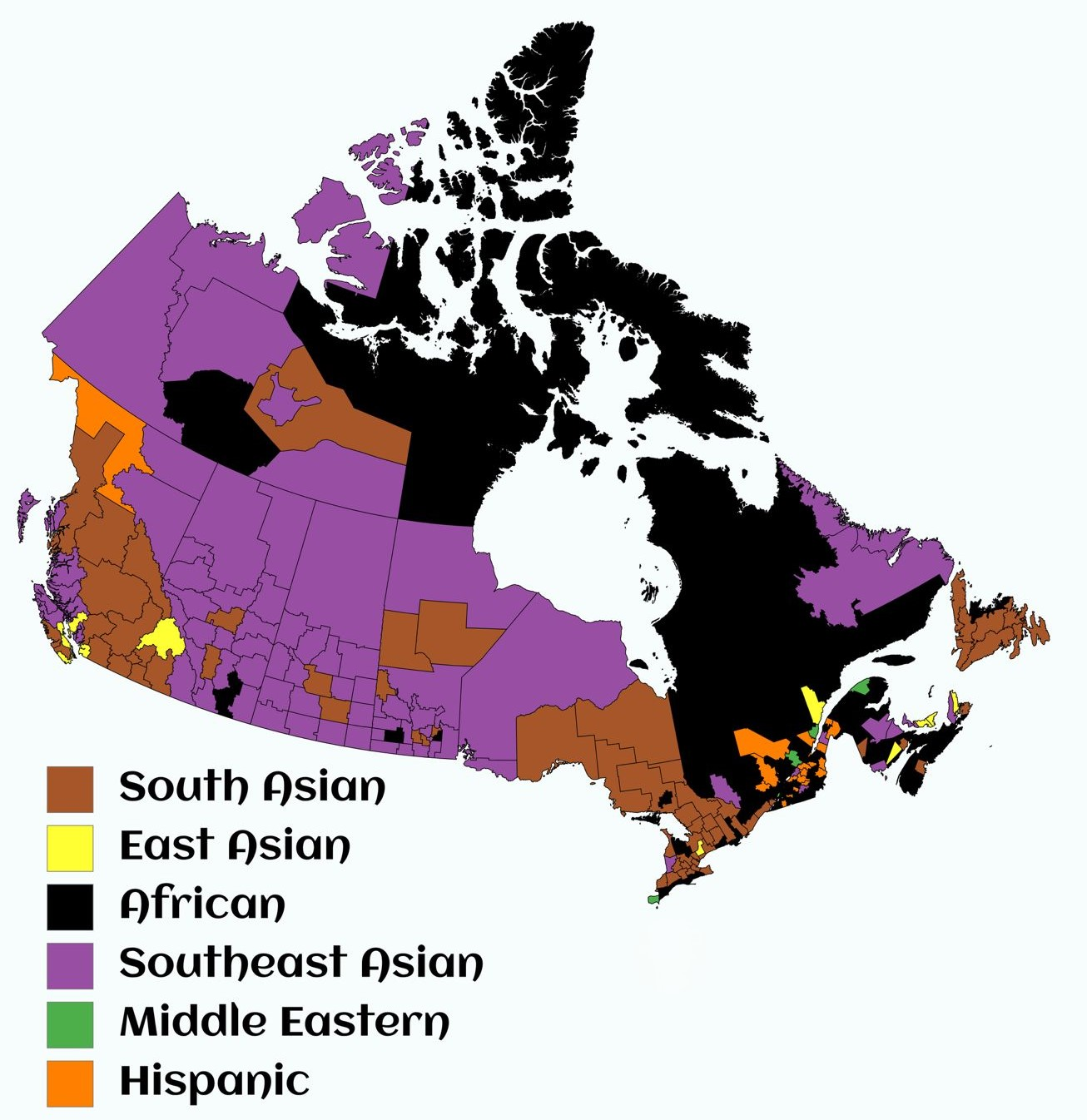
Population distribution largest panethnic visible minority group in Canada by census division, 2021 census

In Canada, a visible minority (French: minorité visible) is a demographic category of people, defined by the Government of Canada as "persons, other than aboriginal peoples, who are non-Caucasian in race or non-white in colour". The term is used primarily as a demographic category by Statistics Canada, in connection with Canada's employment equity, human rights, and other laws and policies. The term as defined, and the qualifier "visible", were chosen by the Canadian authorities as a way to classify and separate out newer immigrant minorities from both aboriginal Canadian minorities, and from other "older" minorities—which were distinguishable by language spoken (French vs. English) and religious identification (Catholics vs. Protestants): so-called "invisible" traits.

The term "visible minority" is sometimes used as a euphemism for "non-white". This is incorrect, in that the government definition creates a difference: Aboriginal people are excluded from the category "visible minorities", but may not be white either. In some cases, members of "visible minorities" may be visually indistinguishable from the majority population and/or may form a majority-minority population locally (as is the case in Vancouver and Toronto).

Since the reform of Canada's immigration laws in the 1960s, immigration has been primarily of people from areas other than Europe; many (but not all) of these immigrants form part of (but not the whole of) the "visible minorities" category within Canada.

== Background ==
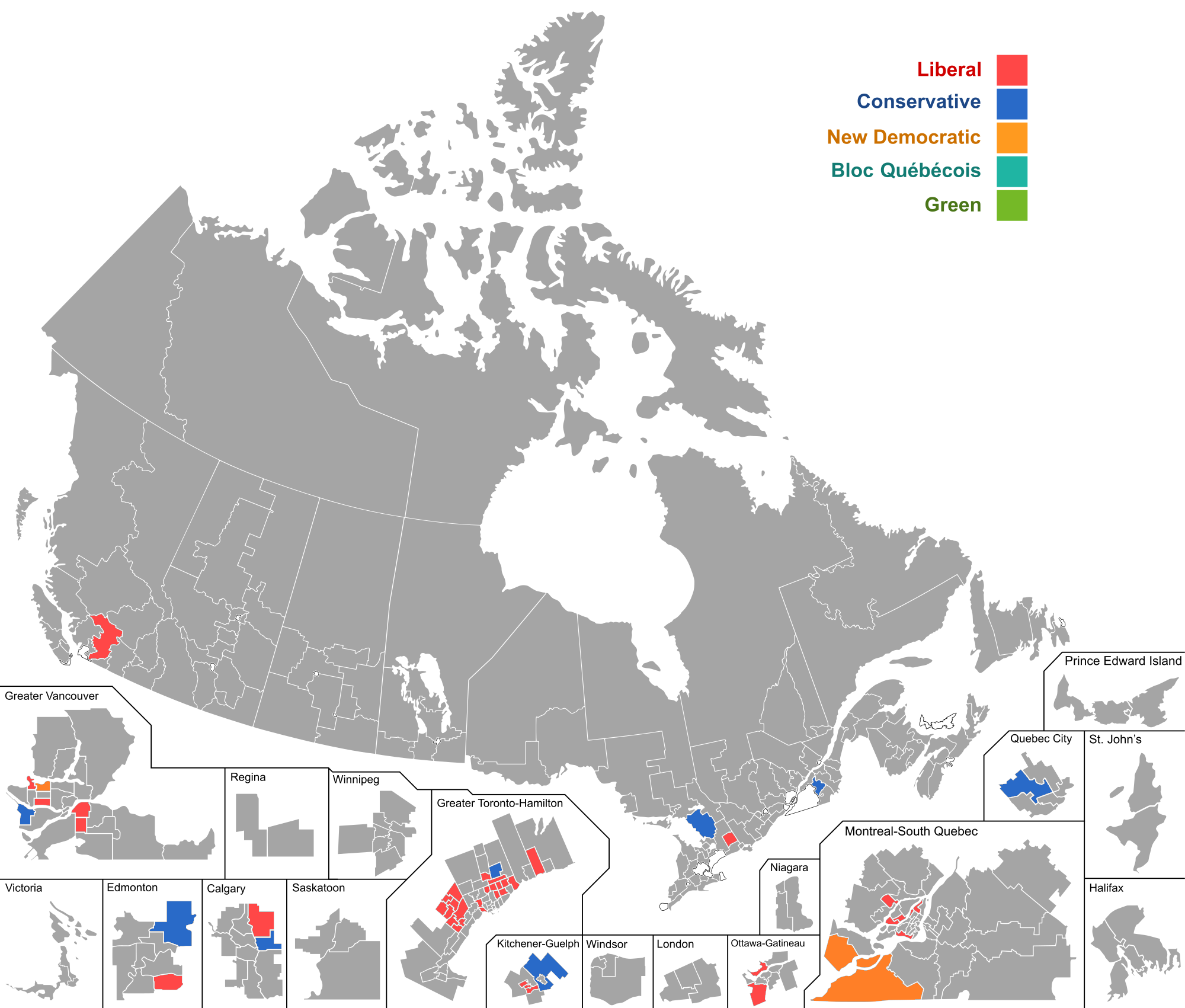
Federal electoral districts represented by visible minorities during the 42nd Canadian Parliament (2015–2019) marked by party colour

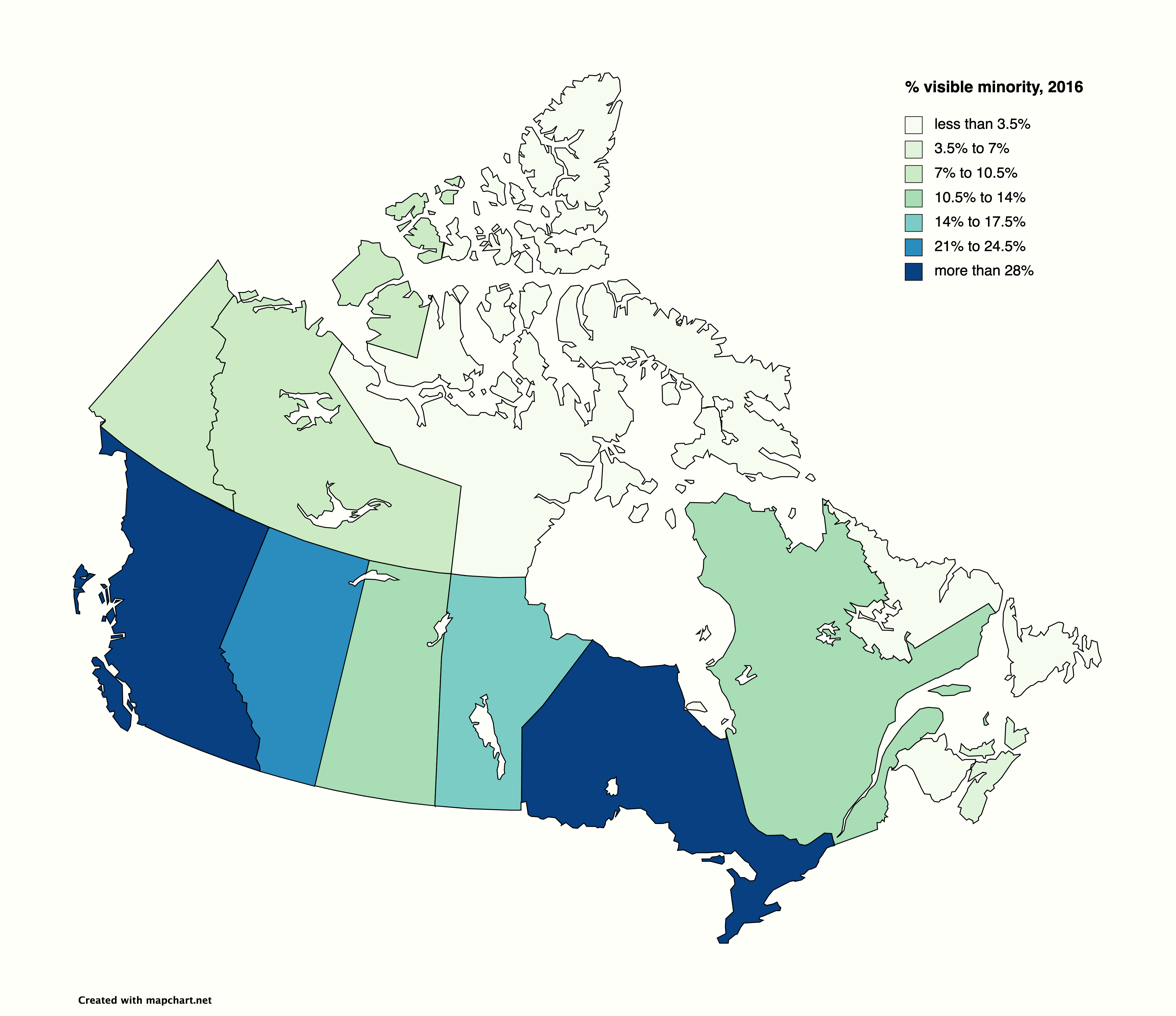
Map of visible minorities in Canada by province, 2016

Some 9,639,200 Canadians identified as a member of a "visible minority group" in the 2021 Canadian Census, for 26.53% of the total population. This was an increase from the 2016 Census, when members of visible minorities accounted for 22.2% of the total population; from the 2011 Census, when the proportion was 19.1%; from the 2006 Census, when the proportion was 16.2%; from 2001, when the proportion was 13.4%; from 1996 (11.2%); from 1991 (9.4%) and from 1981 (4.7%). In 1961, the visible minority population was less than 1%.

The ongoing increase represents a significant shift in Canada's demographics as compared with the predominantly white populations of its earlier history. This change is related primarily to higher rates of immigration from countries which have larger proportions of non-Caucasian or non-white people amongst their populations. This change is associated with the advent in Canada of its multiculturalism and non-discrimination policies.

Statistics Canada projects that by 2041, visible minorities will make up 38.2–43.0% of the total Canadian population, compared with 26.5% in 2021. Statistics Canada further projects that among the working-age population (15 to 64 years), meanwhile, visible minorities will make up 42.1–47.3% of Canada's total population, compared to 28.5% in 2021.

As per the 2021 census, of the provinces, British Columbia had the highest proportion of visible minorities, representing 34.4% of its population, followed by Ontario at 34.3%, Alberta at 27.8% and Manitoba at 22.2%. Additionally, as of 2021, the largest visible minority group was South Asian Canadians with a population of approximately 2.6 million, representing roughly 7.1% of the country's population, followed by Chinese Canadians (4.7%) and Black Canadians (4.3%).

== Demography ==
=== Population ===
Visible Minority population history
Year	Pop.	±%
1981	1,131,825	—
1986	1,577,710	+39.4%
1991	2,525,480	+60.1%
1996	3,197,480	+26.6%
2001	3,983,845	+24.6%
2006	5,068,090	+27.2%
2011	6,264,750	+23.6%
2016	7,674,580	+22.5%
2021	9,639,205	+25.6%
Source: Statistics Canada

Visible minority populations by group (2006–2021)
Visible minority group	2021		2016		2011		2006	
Visible minority group	Pop.	%	Pop.	%	Pop.	%	Pop.	%
South Asian	2,571,400	7.08%	1,924,635	5.59%	1,567,400	4.77%	1,262,865	4.04%
Chinese	1,715,770	4.72%	1,577,060	4.58%	1,324,750	4.03%	1,216,565	3.89%
Black	1,574,870	4.34%	1,198,540	3.48%	945,665	2.88%	783,795	2.51%
Filipino	957,355	2.64%	780,125	2.26%	619,310	1.89%	410,695	1.31%
Arab	694,015	1.91%	523,235	1.52%	380,620	1.16%	265,550	0.85%
Latin American	580,235	1.6%	447,325	1.3%	381,280	1.16%	304,245	0.97%
Southeast Asian	390,340	1.07%	313,260	0.91%	312,075	0.95%	239,935	0.77%
West Asian	360,495	0.99%	264,305	0.77%	206,840	0.63%	156,700	0.5%
Korean	218,140	0.6%	188,710	0.55%	161,130	0.49%	141,890	0.45%
Japanese	98,890	0.27%	92,920	0.27%	87,270	0.27%	81,300	0.26%
Multiple	331,805	0.91%	232,375	0.67%	171,935	0.52%	133,120	0.43%
N.I.E.	172,885	0.48%	132,090	0.38%	106,475	0.32%	71,420	0.23%
Visible minority population	9,639,205	26.53%	7,674,580	22.27%	6,264,750	19.07%	5,068,090	16.22%
Total responses	36,328,480	98.21%	34,460,065	98.03%	32,852,320	98.13%	31,241,030	98.82%
Total population	36,991,981	100%	35,151,728	100%	33,476,688	100%	31,612,897	100%

Visible minority populations by group (1981–2001)
Visible minority group	2001		1996		1991		1986		1981	
Visible minority group	Pop.	%	Pop.	%	Pop.	%	Pop.	%	Pop.	%
Chinese	1,029,395	3.47%	860,150	3.02%	626,435	2.32%	390,590	1.56%	299,915	1.25%
South Asian	917,075	3.09%	670,590	2.35%	505,515	1.87%	300,545	1.2%	223,235	0.93%
Black	662,215	2.23%	573,860	2.01%	504,290	1.87%	355,385	1.42%	239,455	0.99%
Filipino	308,575	1.04%	234,195	0.82%	169,150	0.63%	102,360	0.41%	75,485	0.31%
Latin American	216,980	0.73%	176,970	0.62%	134,535	0.5%	60,975	0.24%	50,230	0.21%
Southeast Asian	198,880	0.67%	172,765	0.61%	132,415	0.49%	86,945	0.35%	53,910	0.22%
Arab	194,685	0.66%	—N/a	—N/a	—N/a	—N/a	—N/a	—N/a	—N/a	—N/a
West Asian	109,285	0.37%	—N/a	—N/a	—N/a	—N/a	—N/a	—N/a	—N/a	—N/a
Korean	100,660	0.34%	64,835	0.23%	45,535	0.17%	29,205	0.12%	22,570	0.09%
Japanese	73,315	0.25%	68,135	0.24%	63,860	0.24%	52,880	0.21%	46,060	0.19%
Arab/West Asian	—N/a	—N/a	244,665	0.86%	289,755	1.07%	149,665	0.6%	112,435	0.47%
N.I.E.	98,915	0.33%	69,745	0.24%	5,440	0.02%	—N/a	—N/a	—N/a	—N/a
Multiple	73,875	0.25%	61,575	0.22%	48,545	0.18%	40,500	0.16%	—N/a	—N/a
Other	—N/a	—N/a	—N/a	—N/a	—N/a	—N/a	8,660	0.03%	8,530	0.04%
Visible minority population	3,983,845	13.44%	3,197,480	11.21%	2,525,480	9.36%	1,577,710	6.31%	1,131,825	4.7%
Total responses	29,639,030	98.77%	28,528,125	98.9%	26,994,040	98.89%	25,022,010	98.86%	24,083,495	98.93%
Total population	30,007,094	100%	28,846,761	100%	27,296,859	100%	25,309,331	100%	24,343,181	100%

=== Religion ===
Visible Minority demography by religion (2001–2021)
Religious group	2021		2011		2001	
Religious group	Pop.	%	Pop.	%	Pop.	%
Christianity	3,615,150	37.5%	2,625,340	41.9%	1,738,200	43.6%
Irreligion	2,438,855	25.3%	1,392,340	22.2%	875,095	22%
Islam	1,583,415	16.4%	925,135	14.8%	497,275	12.5%
Hinduism	823,810	8.5%	494,715	7.9%	291,495	7.3%
Sikhism	769,320	8%	453,120	7.2%	275,715	6.9%
Buddhism	326,835	3.4%	332,300	5.3%	276,275	6.9%
Judaism	12,000	0.1%	7,185	0.1%	5,275	0.1%
Baháʼí	11,060	0.1%	—N/a	—N/a	7,690	0.2%
Jainism	8,180	0.1%	—N/a	—N/a	2,400	0.1%
Personal Faith or Spiritual Beliefs	7,580	0.1%	—N/a	—N/a	—N/a	—N/a
Zoroastrianism	6,850	0.1%	—N/a	—N/a	4,580	0.1%
Druze	5,645	0.1%	—N/a	—N/a	—N/a	—N/a
Other Eastern Religions	4,720	0.05%	—N/a	—N/a	4,325	0.1%
Taoism	3,940	0.04%	—N/a	—N/a	1,675	0.04%
Theism	2,900	0.03%	—N/a	—N/a	—N/a	—N/a
Spiritualism	2,800	0.03%	—N/a	—N/a	—N/a	—N/a
Ancestor Veneration	1,625	0.02%	—N/a	—N/a	—N/a	—N/a
Paganism	1,450	0.02%	—N/a	—N/a	720	0.02%
Shintoism	1,355	0.01%	—N/a	—N/a	490	0.01%
Rastafari	1,335	0.01%	—N/a	—N/a	710	0.02%
Multi-faith	1,120	0.01%	—N/a	—N/a	—N/a	—N/a
Unitarian/Unitarian Universalist	555	0.01%	—N/a	—N/a	—N/a	—N/a
Indigenous spirituality	460	0%	165	0%	740	0.02%
Satanism	415	0%	—N/a	—N/a	95	0%
Animism	385	0%	—N/a	—N/a	—N/a	—N/a
Unity - New Thought - Pantheism	365	0%	—N/a	—N/a	215	0.01%
New Age	330	0%	—N/a	—N/a	60	0%
ECKist	285	0%	—N/a	—N/a	—N/a	—N/a
Shamanism	250	0%	—N/a	—N/a	—N/a	—N/a
Gnosticism	175	0%	—N/a	—N/a	140	0%
Scientology	105	0%	—N/a	—N/a	70	0%
Other	4,935	0.1%	34,450	0.5%	585	0%
Total Visible Minority population	9,639,205	100%	6,264,750	100%	3,983,845	100%

== Geographical distribution ==
=== Subdivisions ===
==== 2021 census ====
National average: 26.5%
Source: Canada 2021 Census

- Note: Subdivisions shown below have visible minority populations above the national average.

Alberta

- Brooks (48.5%)
- Edmonton (42.8%)
- Chestermere (42.4%)
- Calgary (41.4%)
- Wood Buffalo (27.3%)

British Columbia

- Richmond (80.3%)
- Burnaby (67.8%)
- Greater Vancouver A (67.2%)
- Surrey (67.1%)
- Coquitlam (56.5%)
- Vancouver (54.5%)
- New Westminster (46.8%)
- Delta (45.3%)
- West Vancouver (43.2%)
- Abbotsford (40.2%)
- Port Coquitlam (39.7%)
- North Vancouver (city) (36.3%)
- Port Moody (32.7%)
- North Vancouver (district) (29.1%)
- Langley (district) (26.6%)

Manitoba

- Neepawa (53.1%)
- Winnipeg (34.4%)

Ontario

- Markham (82.1%)
- Brampton (80.6%)
- Richmond Hill (66.4%)
- Ajax (64.6%)
- Mississauga (61.9%)
- Toronto (55.7%)
- Milton (55.2%)
- Pickering (51.9%)
- Whitchurch-Stouffville (46.3%)
- Oakville (42.5%)
- Vaughan (41.3%)
- Aurora (38.9%)
- Whitby (35.4%)
- Waterloo (35%)
- Newmarket (34.9%)
- Windsor (33.6%)
- Ottawa (32.5%)
- Kitchener (31.7%)
- Oshawa (28.9%)
- London (28.7%)

Quebec

- Brossard (50.3%)
- Dollard-des-Ormeaux (43.3%)
- Montréal (38.8%)
- Laval (32.7%)
- Mount Royal (32.3%)
- Kirkland (31.7%)
- Dorval (28%)

==== 2016 census ====
National average: 22.3%
Source: Canada 2016 Census

- Note: Subdivisions shown below have visible minority populations above the national average.

Alberta

- Edmonton (37.1%)
- Brooks (36.8%)
- Calgary (36.2%)
- Chestermere (35.0%)
- Wood Buffalo (26.7%)
- Banff (24.4%)

British Columbia

- Richmond (76.3%)
- Burnaby (63.6%)
- Greater Vancouver A (67.3%)
- Surrey (58.5%)
- Vancouver (51.6%)
- Coquitlam (50.2%)
- New Westminster (38.9%)
- West Vancouver (36.4%)
- Delta (36.0%)
- Abbotsford (33.7%)
- Port Coquitlam (32.4%)
- North Vancouver (city) (31.3%)
- Port Moody (30.5%)
- North Vancouver (district) (25.6%)

Manitoba

- Neepawa (40.7%)
- Winnipeg (28.0%)

Ontario

- Markham (77.9%)
- Brampton (73.3%)
- Richmond Hill (60.0%)
- Mississauga (57.2%)
- Ajax (56.7%)
- Toronto (51.5%)
- Pickering (42.9%)
- Milton (42.8%)
- Whitchurch-Stouffville (36.9%)
- Vaughan (35.4%)
- Oakville (30.8%)
- Aurora (26.9%)
- Windsor (26.9%)
- Waterloo (26.4%)
- Ottawa (26.3%)
- Newmarket (25.8%)
- Whitby (25.3%)

Quebec

- Brossard (42.9%)
- Dollard-des-Ormeaux (38.8%)
- Montréal (34.2%)
- Laval (26.1%)
- Mount Royal (24.7%)
- Kirkland (24.2%)
- Dorval (23.4%)

==== 2011 census ====
National average: 19.1%
Source: Canada 2011 Census

- Note: Subdivisions shown below have visible minority populations above the national average.

Alberta

- Calgary (30.1%)
- Edmonton (30.0%)
- Chestermere (29.2%)
- Brooks (26.7%)
- Banff (22.2%)

British Columbia

- Richmond (70.4%)
- Greater Vancouver A (62.1%)
- Burnaby (59.5%)
- Surrey (52.6%)
- Vancouver (51.8%)
- Coquitlam (43.8%)
- New Westminster (34.8%)
- Delta (30.2%)
- Abbotsford (29.6%)
- North Vancouver (city) (29.2%)
- Port Moody (28.9%)
- Port Coquitlam (28.5%)
- West Vancouver (28.2%)
- North Vancouver (district) (22.0%)

Manitoba

- Winnipeg (21.4%)

Ontario

- Markham (72.3%)
- Brampton (66.4%)
- Mississauga (53.7%)
- Richmond Hill (52.9%)
- Toronto (49.1%)
- Ajax (45.8%)
- Pickering (35.4%)
- Vaughan (31.4%)
- Milton (29.9%)
- Whitchurch-Stouffville (24.5%)
- Ottawa (23.7%)
- Windsor (22.9%)
- Oakville (22.8%)
- Waterloo (20.4%)
- Whitby (19.2%)
- Newmarket (19.2%)

Quebec

- Brossard (38.3%)
- Dollard-des-Ormeaux (35.9%)
- Montréal (31.7%)
- Dorval (22.1%)
- Kirkland (20.8%)
- Mount Royal (20.8%)
- Laval (20.7%)

==== 2006 census ====
National average: 16.2%
Source: Canada 2006 Census

- Note: Subdivisions shown below have visible minority populations above the national average.

Alberta

- Calgary (23.7%)
- Edmonton (22.9%)
- Chestermere (17.8%)
- Brooks (17.1%)
- Banff (16.8%)

British Columbia

- Richmond (65.1%)
- Burnaby (55.4%)
- Greater Vancouver A (55.2%)
- Vancouver (51.0%)
- Surrey (46.1%)
- Coquitlam (38.6%)
- New Westminster (29.6%)
- Delta (27.0%)
- Abbotsford (26.4%)
- North Vancouver (city) (26.2%)
- Port Coquitlam (25.7%)
- Port Moody (25.3%)
- West Vancouver (22.8%)
- North Vancouver (district) (22.2%)

Manitoba

- Winnipeg (16.3%)

Ontario

- Markham (65.4%)
- Brampton (57.0%)
- Mississauga (49.0%)
- Toronto (46.9%)
- Richmond Hill (45.7%)
- Ajax (35.6%)
- Pickering (30.5%)
- Vaughan (26.6%)
- Windsor (21.0%)
- Ottawa (20.2%)
- Oakville (18.4%)
- Milton (17.1%)
- Whitby (17.0%)
- Waterloo (16.9%)

Quebec

- Brossard (34.3%)
- Dollard-des-Ormeaux (30.9%)
- Montréal (26.0%)
- Mount Royal (19.7%)
- Dorval (19.1%)
- Kirkland (18.7%)

==== 2001 census ====
National average: 13.4%
Source: Canada 2001 Census

- Note: Subdivisions shown below have visible minority populations above the national average.

Alberta

- Edmonton (19.7%)
- Calgary (18.7%)
- Banff (17.3%)

British Columbia

- Richmond (59.0%)
- Vancouver (49.0%)
- Burnaby (48.6%)
- Greater Vancouver A (43.5%)
- Surrey (36.7%)
- Coquitlam (34.3%)
- New Westminster (24.9%)
- Delta (23.4%)
- North Vancouver (city) (22.6%)
- Port Coquitlam (22.3%)
- Port Moody (20.7%)
- Abbotsford (20.4%)
- West Vancouver (20.3%)
- North Vancouver (district) (19.3%)
- Squamish (16.8%)
- Fort St. James (14.7%)
- Saanich (13.7%)

Manitoba

- Winnipeg (13.4%)

Ontario

- Markham (55.5%)
- Toronto (42.8%)
- Richmond Hill (40.4%)
- Mississauga (40.3%)
- Brampton (40.2%)
- Pickering (26.4%)
- Ajax (24.3%)
- Vaughan (19.0%)
- Ottawa (18.0%)
- Windsor (17.2%)
- Waterloo (13.5%)

Quebec

- Saint-Laurent (38.2%)
- Brossard (27.7%)
- Dollard-des-Ormeaux (26.0%)
- Pierrefonds (25.8%)
- Montréal-Nord (23.5%)
- Montréal (22.7%)
- Saint-Léonard (20.8%)
- LaSalle (20.6%)
- Kirkland (17.2%)
- Roxboro (16.6%)
- Mount Royal (15.4%)
- Anjou (15.1%)

== Legislative versus operational definitions ==
According to the Employment Equity Act of 1995, the definition of visible minority is: "persons, other than aboriginal peoples, who are non-Caucasian in race or non-white in colour".

Frances Woolley traces this definition back to the 1984 Report of the Abella Commission on Equality in Employment. The Commission described the term visible minority as an "ambiguous categorization", but for practical purposes interpreted it to mean "visibly non-white". The Canadian government uses an operational definition by which it identifies the following groups as visible minorities: "Chinese, South Asian, Black, Filipino, Latin American, Southeast Asian, Arab, West Asian, Korean, Japanese, Visible minority, n.i.e. (n.i.e. means "not included elsewhere"), and Multiple visible minority".

If census respondents check one identity but write-in others, e.g. checking "Black” or "South Asian” and writing in “Malaysian", “French" or “European", they would be included in the Black or South Asian counts respectively. However, the 2006 Census states that respondents that add a European ethnic response in combination with certain visible minority groups are not counted as visible minorities. They must add another non-European ethnic response to be counted as such:

In contrast, in accordance with employment equity definitions, persons who reported 'Latin American' and 'White,' 'Arab' and 'White,' or 'West Asian' and 'White' have been excluded from the visible minority population. Likewise, persons who reported 'Latin American,' 'Arab' or 'West Asian' and who provided a European write-in response such as 'French' have been excluded from the visible minority population as well. These persons are included in the 'Not a visible minority' category. However, persons who reported 'Latin American,' 'Arab' or 'West Asian' and a non-European write-in response are included in the visible minority population.

The term "non-white" is used in the wording of the Employment Equity Act and in employment equity questionnaires distributed to applicants and employees. This is intended as a shorthand phrase for those who are in the Aboriginal and/or visible minority groups.

== Controversy ==
The classification "visible minorities" has attracted controversy, both nationally and from abroad. The UN Committee on the Elimination of Racial Discrimination stated in 2007 that it had doubts regarding the use of this term since this term may be considered objectionable by certain minorities, and recommended an evaluation of its use. In response, the Canadian government made efforts to evaluate how it is used in Canadian society through commissioning of scholars and open workshops.

In 2008, Graeme Hamilton, argued in the National Post that the "visible minorities" label no longer makes sense in some large Canadian cities, due to immigration trends in recent decades. For example, "visible minorities" comprise the majority of the population in many municipalities across the country, primarily in British Columbia, Ontario, and Alberta.

Another criticism of the label concerns the composition of "visible minorities". Critics have noted that the groups comprising "visible minorities" have little in common with each other, as they include both disadvantaged groups and non-disadvantaged groups. geographer Harald Bauder calls the concept of visible minority an example of what Audrey Kobayashi names a statistext, meaning a census category that has been contrived for a particular public policy purpose. Seeing "visible minorities" as creating a racialized group, Rosemary Campbell-Stephens and Sachin Maharaj advocate for "global majority" as a more appropriate alternative.

== See also ==
- Affirmative action
- Classification of ethnicity in the United Kingdom
- Colourism
- Employment equity (Canada)
- Ethnic penalty
- Global majority
- Invisible disability
- List of visible minority politicians in Canada
- Majority minority
- Minority language
- Multiculturalism in Canada
- Person of colour
- Race and ethnicity in censuses
- Race and ethnicity in the United States Census
- Racialism (racial categorization)
- Racialized person
