= List of Dinosaur King characters =

This is a list of characters that appear in Dinosaur King. The English versions of the series use names differing from the Japanese versions; in this article the English names are used.

== Humans ==
=== D-Team ===
The D-Team are the protagonists of the series who are very knowledgeable about dinosaurs. They prevent the Alpha Gang from succeeding in their goal by saving the dinosaurs they can find.

Maximus "Max" Taylor / Ryuta Kodai (古代 リュウタ, Kodai Ryūta)
Voiced by: Megumi Matsumoto (Japanese); Veronica Taylor (English)

Max Taylor is the son of a paleontologist Dr. Spike Taylor. He is the unofficial leader of D-Team. Max is mostly seen wearing a visor that has Triceratops horns which double as flashlights. He is brash, impulsive and does not generally think his actions through. Max deeply cares for dinosaurs and hates how the Alpha Gang abuses them. His partner is a Triceratops called Chomp, which he named because he chomps away on anything he can get his mouth on. Besides having Chomp, Max owns some most of the lightning and water wild dinosaurs that they claim.

Rex Owen (レックス・オーエン, Rekkusu Ōen)
True name: Rex Ancient (used in the 4Kids English dub only)
Voiced by: Matsuri Mizuguchi (Japanese); Sebastian Arcelus (English)

Max's best friend, Rex was found as an infant by paleontologist Dr. Owen in an egg-like container within a dinosaur exhibit in New York. Rex is now 11 and has been left with Max and his family while his father goes searching for fossils with Dr. Owen being a family friend of the Taylor family. It is revealed in one episode that Rex was left at Max's house because his father wanted him to be near a real family. Rex's partner is a Carnotaurus he named Ace. Rex also owns most of the fire and wind dinosaurs. Rex is a good-hearted boy and is relatively quiet, but also quite short-tempered from the beginning. At the end of the first series, it is revealed that Rex's real parents are Dr. Ancient and Dr. Cretacia and he reunites with them. In the finale, Rex, the Alpha Gang, Seth, Chomp, Ace, Paris and the Ancients return to the year 2126.

Zoe Drake / Malm Tatsuno (竜野 マルム, Tatsuno Marumu)
Voiced by: Tomoko Kobashi (Japanese); Kether Donohue (English)

The younger sister of Dr. Reese Drake whose sunglasses double as a camera. Zoe knows when to keep focused and cares deeply for her friends. Zoe sometimes shows to be excessively fond of some stars. She owns a Parasaurolophus called Paris and also most of the grass dinosaurs. Zoe's parents are both veterinarians and own an animal hospital. In the dub of episode "Vaccination Vacation", the Drake's home as well as the family was transported onto Zeta Point.

Dr. Spike Taylor / Dr. Kenryu Kodai (古代剣竜博士, Kodai Kenryū-hakase (lit. Ancient Stegosaur Doctor))
Voiced by: Naoya Uchida (Japanese); David Wills (English)

Dr. Spike Taylor is Max's father and a paleontologist. Like Max, Spike is obsessed with dinosaurs and runs the D-Lab. He wields a whip that often gets caught on things which are generally things he is not aiming for. Dr. Taylor can also be over-reactive when a dinosaur appears. He also saves the D-Team when they are cornered by the Alpha Gang, catches the new cards, and reclaims the lost Dino Holders from Seth. His name is a pun on "Spike Tail" (a nickname for Stegosaurus). In the "Mesozoic Meltdown" episodes, the Taylors, the Ancients, and the Drakes get captured by Spectral Space Pirates.

Dr. Reese Drake / Riasu Tatsuno (竜野 リアス, Tatsuno Riasu)
Voiced by: Eri Komiyama (Japanese); Rachael Lillis (English)

A scientist who is Zoe's older sister, Dr. Spike Taylor's assistant, a certified pilot, and the creator of the D-Team's Dino Holders. She maintains a calm personality at all times when around others and has a rather monotonic voice even when angry or embarrassed. Zander has feelings for Reese which she may or may not return given that she couldn't recognize Zander without her glasses. Reese stays at the D-Lab in the Mesozoic Meltdown with Rod and Laura and is later taken hostage by Seth and his Cryolophosaurus.

=== Alpha Gang ===
The Alpha Gang are the primary antagonists of the first series who abduct any dinosaur cards they find using their own dinosaurs as their muscle. They conduct experiments on the dinosaur cards they find. The Alpha Gang's headquarters is the mobile island called Zeta Point which was later revealed to be a disguised timeship called the Backlander. They later renounce their evil ways in the finale of the first season when Seth turns on them and later help the D-Team in their fight with the Spectral Space Pirates. Among its members are:

Dr. Z / Dr. Sonoida (Dr.ソーノイダ, Dokutā Sōnoida)
Voiced by: Tetsuo Goto (Japanese); Eric Stuart (English)

The zany, egotistic, and incompetent mad scientist who is the leader of the Alpha Gang and the grandfather of Laura and Rod. Dr. Z plans to use the dinosaur cards in his plans to rule the world. He also seems to know the history of these cards, though he was not the creator as the method was created by Dr. Ancient and Dr. Cretacia. Dr. Z did invent the Move Cards that Dr. Ancient had been dissatisfied with. When Dr. Ancient and Dr. Cretacia wanted to return to the year 2126 to raise baby Rex, Dr. Z and Seth jettisoned their pods into the timestream and tried to do the same for baby Rex only for the intervention of Jonathan to prevent that. This accident caused the Alpha Gang to end up in the present day and the dinosaur cards were scattered throughout the Earth. Dr. Z often sends Ursula, Zander and Ed to obtain dinosaur cards (which were scattered when his time machine exploded) for him while he stays in his lab on Zeta Point researching and experimenting with the dinosaur cards that he already has, unless it is a certain occasion. When Ursula, Zander, and Ed fail, he always berates them for their incompetence and punishes them in different ways. Dr. Z sometimes attempts to aid them with some of his inventions, but his inventions often explode as a running gag. Dr. Z has accompanied Ursula, Zander, and Ed when it came to missions that involved Dr. Z reclaiming his Secret Dinosaurs which he worked on. When he had a bad back from holding up Alpha Metal, he didn't like Seth's idea of having his grandchildren obtaining the Dinosaur Cards. In the battle against the Spectral Space Pirates, Dr. Z invented the Dino-Tectors so that the dinosaurs of the D-Team and the Alpha Gang can armor up.

Ursula / Usarapa (ウサラパ, Usarapa)
Voiced by: Misa Watanabe (Japanese); Rachael Lillis (English)

A member of the Alpha Gang, Ursula works with Zander and Ed to obtain dinosaur cards for Dr. Z. She is often conceited, acting like a queen in front of her two cohorts and possessing an elevated, almost delusional, opinion of her beauty. Whenever failure occurs with the three, Ursula thinks that it is not her own fault (even when it is), but blames the other two who keep bringing her down. A running gag is that she is often called an "old lady" (usually by Zoe, "Obasan" in Japanese, meaning grandma or grandmother) which drives her crazy, and she always knows when somebody calls her that no matter how far away they are. Dr. Owen later develops a crush on her which she doesn't return. In the second series, Ursula was being asked to marry Dr. Owen in the final episode, but she rejected him in return.

Zander / Noratty (ノラッティ～, Norattī)
Voiced by: Kenyuu Horiuchi (Japanese); Darren Dunstan (English)

The tall sunglasses-wearing member of the Alpha Gang, Zander works with Ursula and Ed to obtain dinosaur cards for Dr. Z. He is usually the one who comes up with a plan that always goes horribly wrong. Zander is also the person who buys the Alpha Gang's vehicles and has to deal with the consequences when they are destroyed or lost. He tries to act smart and sophisticated, but is nervous, awkward, and cowardly most of the time. In episode 30, he develops a crush on Reese.

Ed / Edo (エド)
Voiced by: Junichi Endo (Japanese); David Wills (English)

The short fat member of the Alpha Gang, Ed works with Ursula and Zander to obtain dinosaur cards for Dr. Z. Despite his cowardly behavior, he follows the other two anywhere even if they end up in a dangerous predicament. Ed likes cute girls and enjoys eating bananas though he is something of a glutton and is fond of eating in general. Ed is the funny one on the team and is rather stupid. His only sign of intelligence is in "The Forest Fire Effect" when he shows them what kind of damage would be done by the fire the fight against the Spectral Space Pirates caused in the Jurassic Period (which resulted in sentient plants and giant insects). In the video game however, he is the complete opposite of how he is in the show. Ed also had a running gag in the first series on jinxing his team during missions. He doesn't have an official partner, but Ed prefers to use "Tank" a lot.

Rod / Roto (ロト) and Laura / Loa (ロア, Roa)
Rod Voiced by: Yuriko Fuchizaki (Japanese); Meredith Zeitlin (English)
Laura Voiced by: Asuka Tanii (Japanese); Rachael Lillis (English)

Rod and Laura Dr. Z's grandchildren. Rod is gifted with science and often helps his grandfather with his inventions. Laura is a genius with numbers and makes money playing in the stock market to fund the Alpha Gang's activities. Despite the pair being considerably more intelligent than Ursula, Zander and Ed, they generally just stay at the base and rarely come up with any plans. Seth later appoints them to obtain the dinosaurs for him when both of them feel homesick. Around the time when Seth turns against Dr. Z, Laura and Rod find out about what Dr. Z and Seth did with Dr. Ancient and Dr. Cretacia during the trip back to their own time. In the second series, they stay with Reece while the rest of the gang travel through time, although later on they rejoin the gang when a plant invasion occurs. Unlike other members of the Alpha Gang, Rod and Laura seem to get along with Max and the others by the second series.

Seth / Nopis (ノーピス, Nōpisu)
Voiced by: Daisuke Hirakawa (Japanese); Marc Thompson (English)

Seth is a mystical human with knowledge about the dinosaurs and the cards as he was the former assistant of Dr. Ancient. He is manipulative, calm and cunning, but Seth's goals were to actually alter time with the altered dinosaurs he created to negate the dinosaurs' extinction. To achieve that, Seth allies himself with Dr. Z, playing on the man's agenda and even helping him in jettisoning Dr. Ancient and Cretia's pods into the timestream. Being the most intelligent member of the Alpha Gang, Seth is often annoyed by the antics of Ursula, Zander, and Ed with whom he denies association. He is often seen assisting some of the Alpha Droids in repairing Dr. Z's time machine and even giving him a status report. At the time when Dr. Z was recuperating from a bad back, Seth had Laura and Rod obtain the dinosaur cards for his own agenda. When Jonathan manages to expose his plot, Seth finally turns on his comrades by using the Fire Scorcher move on Saurophaganax causing the D-Team and the Alpha Gang to retreat. He then caused the Alpha Gang to retreat as he turns a complete Tyrannosaurus fossil into the Black Tyrannosaurus to hold them and the D-Team at bay while he attempts to go back to the past. However, as Black Tyrannosaurus was defeated by the combined powers of the D-Team and the Alpha Gang with Max and Chomp attempting to stop him on their own, the time ship's systems overloaded with Seth sucked into the timestream as a result. He was later rescued by the Spectral Space Pirates and ally with them under the alias of The Fourth Man (第四の男). When working for the Spectral Space Pirates, Seth created Gigas, Maximus, and Armatus (presumably from the fossils that he had based their dinosaur forms off of in the same way he created the Black Tyrannosaurus). Seth later sets up a trick to sneak into the D-Team's time ship and get the Cosmos Stones. He eventually attacks the Spectral Space Pirates with his Cryolophosaurus after this. After a battle with the D-Team, he manages to get the Cosmos Stones before Jark reclaims them and forms the Black Pterosaur. Seth ended up unconscious after ramming the Backlander into the Black Pterosaur. His comatose body was taken back to the future with Rex and the Alpha Gang.

Helga / Dalbonn (タルボーンヌ, darubōnnu)
Voiced by: Seiko Tamura (Japanese); Maddie Blaustein (series one), Mike Pollock (series two) (English)

Helga serves as a strict and short-tempered housekeeper of the Alpha Gang. Sometimes she seems too large and too strong to be a human. It is later revealed that she is actually a robot created by Dr. Z when the D-Team encounter her again in Cambodia and even protects Laura and Rod from the Stegosaurus. When in Chinatown to reclaim Laura and Rod, Seth ends up deactivating Helga causing Zeta Point to end up a mess without her. She was retrieved when her body ended up in Hollywood, but with bad programming. When Seth turns on the Alpha Gang, Helga holds off the Saurophaganax enough for Dr. Z, Ursula, Zander, Ed, and Rod to escape. She was later repaired by Jonathan and later ends up accompanying the D-Team and the Alpha Gang in fighting the Spectral Space Pirates. Helga was the one who discovered that the Gel-Jarks have a weakness to salt.

Alpha Droids
Voiced by: Darren Dunstan

Obedient robots that work for the Alpha Gang which are so poorly programmed that they fail at everything they do. The most common model of Alpha Droid is the Actroid which can curl up into balls for easy transportation. In "Field of Screams", it is shown that the Alpha Droids can become dizzy as seen when they end up bunched up into one soccer ball. They make more appearances in the original series, but are seen occasionally in the Pterosaur Legends (especially during the Caribbean and at the finale). The Nintendo DS video game introduces the Kakutoroid model Alpha Droid. They are muscular, strong and red in color as they are strong enough to throw dinosaurs around. They are usually tougher to beat than the Actroids.

=== Spectral Space Pirates ===
The Spectral Space Pirates / Space Pirates Zanjark (宇宙海賊ザンジャーク, Uchū Kaizoku Zanjāku) are the antagonists of the second series. They are a group of space pirates composed by the strange aliens with retractable wings who use dinosaur cards they have somehow obtained to aid in their search for the arcane "Cosmos Stones", using a mind-control device to control the dinosaurs. Each one has their own Dino-Card Activator. Its members are:

Spectre / Jark (ジャーク, Jāku)
Voiced by: Katsuhisa Hōki (Japanese); Maddie Blaustein (in "Coliseum Clash"), Sean Schemmel (later episodes) (English)

The leader and captain of the Spectral Space Pirates, he uses dinosaurs to collect the Cosmos Stone. Spectre is the one who supplies his henchmen with the dinosaur cards, Move Cards, and Spectral Armor Cards. Spectre is often seen with a small Apatosaurus named Brontykins in his arm. He is a horrible singer.

Gabbro / Gunenco (グーネンコ, Gūnenko)
Voiced by: Yasuhiro Mamiya (Japanese); Marc Diraison (English)

Gavro is a large and strong red-skinned simple-minded alien. His Dino-Card Activator is on his chest armor and his altered dinosaur was Gigas the Tyrannosaurus.

Foolscap / Zapper (ザッパー, Zappā)
Voiced by: Setsuji Satō (Japanese); Marc Thompson (English)

Foolscap is a slender alien who ponders agility. His Dino-Card Activator is on his headband and his altered dinosaur was Armatus the Stegosaurus.

Sheer / Mihasa (ミハサ, Mihasa)
Voiced by: Asuka Tanii (Japanese); Lauren Weisman (English)

Sheer has a beautiful semblance, but a ruthless heart. Her Dino-Card Activator is on her necklace and her altered dinosaur was Maximus the Triceratops. During the Ancient Japan arc, Sheer had amnesia and joined the kunoichi.

Seth

See Alpha Gang

Goma (ゴーマ)

Goma is an arcade-only character. He was first a member of the Spectral Space Pirates, but is now the leader of the Shadow Kingdom. He appears after he finds the defeated Space Pirates. After discovering what had happened to his father (Spectre) and his three minions, he decides to challenge the D-Team himself. He owns an Eocarcharia, which he has altered. It is the most powerful Shadow Empire dinosaur, possessing Shadow Fire. It can be upgraded into Super Eocarcharia. This dinosaur has an Element Booster design based on Goma's outfit.

Gel Jarks

Obedient gel-based robots that work for the Space Pirates. They can easily transform, but they dissolve upon contact with salt. Helga was the first to discover their weakness at the time when they attacked her in the Backlander's kitchen. As of the finale, only one Gel Jark remains and is taking care of the unconscious Seth.

=== Supporting characters ===
Aki Taylor / Aki Kodai (古代 亜紀, Kodai Aki)
Voiced by: Chiaki Kanō (Japanese); Veronica Taylor (English)

Aki Taylor is Max's mother and Dr. Taylor's wife. A sketchbook artist and housewife, not much is known about Aki except that she believes (or pretends to believe) that the dinosaurs are dogs since Dr. Taylor opted to keep his wife in the dark about the truth for the time being. She often embarrasses Max with talks about when he was a baby and called him by his full name Maximus during one of these. Aki's appearances are generally brief. During the second series, she finds out what the dinosaurs really are.

Dr. Owen
Voiced by: Hiroshi Shirokuma (Japanese); Sean Schemmel (English)

Dr. Owen is a paleontologist who is Dr. Taylor's colleague and Rex's adoptive father. He discovers Rex as a baby in The American Museum of Natural History and adopts him. Dr. Owen sends Rex to live with the Taylor family to give him a more "normal" family environment and also seeks a woman to marry so that he can give his adoptive son a mother. He develops a crush on Ursula. In the second season, he also stays in the present with Reece, Laura, and Rod. At the end of Pterosaur Legends, he once again asks Ursula to marry him, but she replies with a "no".

Patrick
Voiced by: Masao Komaya (Japanese); Eric Stuart (English)

Patrick is Dr. Owen's assistant and appears since episode 30. He often travels with Dr. Owen wherever he goes and has experience in lassoing.

Jonathan / Jurasson (ジュラオン, Jurasson)
Voiced by: Hiroshi Naka (Japanese); Dan Green (English)

Jonathan is a mysterious old man with conspicuous beard. He appears all over the world, in various guises (including a pilot, a street merchant, a Balinese tour guide, a famous chef, and a train conductor) usually right where dinosaurs are found. Jonathan is eventually revealed to be a robot who can change his appearance by rotating his head upside down when it came to his conductor duty. He had data that had Dr. Ancient's data which ended up extracted by Seth. Jonathan manages to save the D-Team from a deflected attack from Terry during his fight with the Ampelosaurus. The D-Team had his body shipped to the D-Lab and Reece was able to reactivate him. Jonathan makes his way to Zeta Point and by the time the D-Team arrived with Rod, Jonathan managed to expose Seth's plot. Following Seth's Saurophaganax defeating the dinosaurs of the D-Team and the Alpha Gang, Jonathan managed to rescue Rex. Near the end of the first series, Jonathan revealed himself to be Dr. Ancient's butler who was charged with protecting Rex and even brought up the history of what the Alpha Gang did. He reappears in the second season as the pilot of the Backlander.

Mr. and Mrs. Drake
Mr. Drake Voiced by: Maddie Blaustein (series one), Mike Pollock (series two)
Mrs. Drake Voiced by: Bella Hudson

They are Zoe's parents and they run a veterinarian clinic. They, along with Mr. and Mrs. Ancient and Mr. and Mrs. Taylor, are abducted by the Spectral Space Pirates in the second season.

Dr. Ancient and Dr. Cretacia
Dr. Ancient Voiced by: Wayne Grayson
Dr. Cretacia Voiced by: Lauren Weisman

Dr. Ancient and Dr. Cretacia are scientists who are Rex's real parents. They were the ones who have discovered a way to turn dinosaurs into cards. Dr. Ancient was displeased that Dr. Z created Move Cards for them. When Dr. Cretacia became pregnant, they wanted to return, but Dr. Z and Seth had other plans. They ended up jettisoning Dr. Ancient and Dr. Cretacia's pods into the timestream and tried to do the same to baby Rex. They were somehow recovered as they were in the pod room following Black Tyrannosaurus' defeat. Dr. Ancient and Dr. Cretacia were reunited with their son. In the second season, they alongside the Taylors and the Drakes were captured by Zanjark so that the Ancients can help them with their experiment.

=== Minor characters ===
Tommy K
Voiced by: Marc Thompson

The host of the "Gobble Gobble Brain Bobble" quiz show. He later appears as the host of the trivia game on the 4Kids Dinosaur King website.

Nathan Deckham
Voiced by: Michael Sinterniklaas

Nathan Peckham is a parody of football player David Beckham. Zoe and Reese both have a crush on him.

Amy
Amy / Umi

A girl who is very timid, but fond of reptiles. Amy has never had any friends until she met Euoplocephalus. Later she finds a lizard and keeps it as a pet, naming it Euoploc (Hannah the Third in the English Dub).

Michelle
Voiced by: Tara Jayne

Max, Rex, and Zoe's teacher.

Mary

Mary is a park ranger who is a member of the Wildlife Protection Team (or WPT for short) and protects the wildlife in the Kenya Reserve by tracking down poachers. She was an old friend of Spike Taylor as both of them had a hobby at lassoing. When Max, Rex, and Zoe arrive in Kenya, they end up running into the rangers led by Mary who suspects that they are associated with the poacher Ungaro. A transmission from Spike ends up revealing to the D-Team that he knows Mary. Following the transmission, Mary agrees to help the D-Team find the Torosaurus while stopping Ungaro. When the D-Team's dinosaurs were able to defeat the Alpha Gang, Mary manages to lasso Ungaro. Afterwards, she and her fellow rangers managed to free

Ungaro
Voiced by: David Wills

Ungaro is a notorious poacher. He and his gang have been poaching animals in the Kenya Reserve and have been evading the Wildlife Protection Team. Ungaro had an encounter with Ursula, Zandar, and Ed who helped them out at the time when they were looking for the Torosaurus. During the Alpha Gang's fight with the D-Team and the Torosaurus, Mary managed to lasso Ungaro who surrendered. When Paris evoked a stampede that chased after Ursula, Zander, and Ed, Ungaro got trampled and quoted "Mom was right! I should've became a plumber!"

Meena
Voiced by: Veronica Taylor

Meena is an Indian princess who befriends and swims alongside the Deltadromeus.

==== Appearing in different time periods ====
The following characters are encountered by the D-Team and the Alpha Gang during their time-travel mission:

Sophia / Sylvia
Voiced by: Rebecca Soler

A girl who the D-Team befriends in Ancient Rome. She came from the town of Trachia which was invaded by the Roman Army sent to attack any who resisted. Her brother Spartacus was among those rounded up and made into a slave. The D-Team helps her free Spartacus from Lucius Cornelius Sulla.

Spartacus
Voiced by: Eric Stuart (first appearance), Marc Thompson (later appearance)

Sophia's brother who is a prisoner of Sulla after he tried to get the slaves to stand up to Lucius Cornelius Sulla. Because of this, he ended up a gladiator at the Colosseum. While Lucius was distracted with the fight between the D-Team and Sheer, Spartacus and Sophia freed the other slaves and escaped.

Lucius Cornelius Sulla
Voiced by: Sean Schemmel

Lucius Cornelius Sulla is a politician of Rome. He sent his army to Trachia to attack anyone who resists him. Some of its civilians were captured and sold as slaves. Spartacus was one of them since he tried to get the slaves to stand up to him. He even planned to eliminate Spartacus by either having him fight lions or the entire Roman Army. Sulla does managed to get Ursula, Zander, and Ed to have Spiny fight Spartacus (who had received the Cosmo Stone to power up his sword) until Sheer comes into view. The D-Team arrived and fought Sheer enough to distract Sulla from noticing Spartacus and Sophia escaping to free the slaves.

Jim / Jimmy
Voiced by: Eva Kaminsky

A boy encountered in the Age of Pirates, trying to get a map stolen by Blackbeard so he could get the Cosmos Stone to save his village from an unmentioned plight. Jimmy and his father were attacked by Blackbeard's pirates and the British Military (who thought Jim and his dad are with Blackbeard). When his dad ends up captured, he helps the D-Team out. He was reunited with his father who was in the company of the British Military.

Blackbeard
Voiced by: Marc Thompson

A pirate captain whom the D-Team encounter in the Caribbean Sea Arc. He aids the Spectral Space Pirates in their quest for the blue Cosmos Stone and has a pet parrot. After his ship was wrecked, Blackbeard and his crew were arrested by the British Military alongside their double agent who agreed to testify against him.

Copper
Voiced by: Eric Stuart

A pirate who serves as Blackbeard's apprentice and second-in-command.

Sansho Hoshi / Shwan-dzang
Voiced by: Frank Frankson

A monk who the D-Team encounter in China's Tang dynasty. He thinks chanting is the answer to all of life's problems. Whether this really works is unknown. Zanjark abducted him from his village in a plot to get to that time period's Cosmos Stone. The D-Team think Genzo might have had something to do with Tank breaking the rock. Dr. Z and Ursula pretend to be him a couple of times with disastrous results ranging from tapping into a lava tunnel running beneath a poor village in the midst of its drought to getting attacked by Gavro.

Ieyasu Tokugawa
Voiced by: Mike Pollock

A shōgun that the D-Team encounter in the Edo period. He was separated from his escort group when Sheer and a bunch of kunoichis attacked. At the same time, Zoe's father falls from the Zanjark Timeship and is mistaken as Ieyasu Tokugawa due to the resemblance. Ieyasu's right-hand man Hanzou goes out to look for the real one while Dr. Drake is used to cover for him.

Zahrah / Sarafa
Voiced by: Caroline Lawson

A Persian princess who is the daughter of the unnamed Sultan. The D-Team encountered in Ancient Persia after she was taken from her caravan by 39 of the 40 Thieves following their attack on it.

Zayid
Voiced by: Sean Schemmel

The leader of the 40 Thieves, he was in cahoots with the Sultan's Prime Minister Rasheed in a plot to overthrow the Sultan and take over the city. Zayid was instructed to get his daughter Zahrah out of the way. When the Alpha Gang was caught with some of their treasure, he forced Ursula, Zander, and Ed to work with them by threatening to kill Dr. Z in various ways. Zayid, Rasheed, and the 40 Thieves were defeated by the D-Team and arrested by the royal guards.

Rasheed
Voiced by: Sam Riegel

The sultan's prime minister, he was in cahoots with Zayid and his 40 Thieves in a plot to overthrow the sultan and take over his city. He ordered the 40 Thieves to abduct Princess Zahrah (who was returning from another city at the time) and get her out of the way. He was thwarted by the D-Team and arrested alongside the 40 Thieves.

Aladdin
Voiced by: Wayne Grayson

A street person who helped the D-Team and Princess Zahrah fight Rasheed and his 40 Thieves allies.

Prince Louis XIII of France
Voiced by: Marc Thompson

The son of Marie de' Medici.

Queen Marie de' Medici

The Queen of France and the mother of Louis XIII.

Lady Constance
Voiced by: Tara Jayne

The servant of a young Louis XIII who allies with the D-Team to get the Eye of Gaia (which is the next Cosmos Stone).

Princess Anne
Voiced by: Rebecca Soler

The fiancé of a younger Louis XIII. She was the godmother of the orphanage that was wrecked during the fight between Chomp and Sheeers' Rajasaurus. Anne was visiting her uncle Dumas at the time. After learning about Richelieu's plot, she helps the D-Team by sending Louis XIII to tell his mother to call off the search.

d'Artagnan
Voiced by: Andrew Rannells

A young boy who lived in an old orphanage that was wrecked during the fight between Chomp and Sheers' Rajasaurus. He was mad at Max for being involved in its destruction. With his fellow orphans, they form the Teen Musketeers and join up with the D-Team and Lady Constance to catch up to Princess Anne.

Cardinal Richelieu
Voiced by: David Zen Mansley

The cardinal to Queen Marie de' Medici who aides the Spectral Space Pirates in finding the next Cosmos Stone (which was believed by some to be the Eye of Gaia).

Pterosaur
Voiced by: Kether Donohue

The Pterosaur is a mysterious female phoenix-like entity that guided the D-Team and the Alpha Gang through time in Mesozoic Meltdown. She is rather large, her body (not including the wings and tail) able to become slightly larger than the Backlander, though is normally seen a bit smaller than that. She seems to somewhat resemble a large, glowing version of the anime's Microraptor. She was first encountered in the cliffhanger of the season's first episode. Throughout the series, the Pterosaur is mostly seen during transitions between the arcs, guiding the D-Team into the different time periods while the Backlander's time circuits are down, following the Spectral Space Pirates so they can try to claim the 7 Cosmos Stones first. She also warns them about the danger of fusing the Cosmos Stones together. After attempting to stop the D-Team from bringing all Cosmos Stones to the same time period while they tried saving the D-Lab from Seth, she last appeared protecting the Backlander from the Space Pirates' dinosaurs' attacks and then cloaking it in light to ram and defeat the Dark Pterosaur. Although it isn't stated, the Pterosaur may come from the fusing of the 7 Element Stones, as these stones and the Pterosaur herself are "positive" opposites of the "negative" Cosmos Stones and Dark Pterosaur, and both feature the same rainbow glow.

Dark Pterosaur

The Dark Pterosaur is the nemesis of the Light Pterosaur. The two are physically identical except for the opposite light/dark colors and the fact that the Dark Pterosaur can expand its outer shell to be as large as an entire city, while still having its "main" self as a separate entity inside.It is an powerful and dark phoenix-like entity formed when Spectre fused all seven Cosmos Stones together in the penultimate episode of Dinosaur King. Its main goal is to wipe out the entire universe and consume space-time itself. The Dark Pterosaur also empowered the Space Pirates' main dinosaurs, granting them invincible forms. Ultimately, it was defeated by Seth, who, with the help of the seven Element Stones and the Pterosaur, destroyed the Dark Pterosaur by colliding with it using the Backlander, preventing the destruction of the universe.It was created when all 7 Cosmos Stones were fused together by Spectre at the end of the season's penultimate episode, and has the ability to rip time and space apart. It charged up the Space Pirates' main dinosaurs and gave the Pirates themselves incorporeal forms of allegedly ultimate power. The Dark Pterosaur was destroyed by Seth, who, with the help of the 7 Element Stones and the Pterosaur, rammed into it with the Backlander and destroyed it, the Element Stones' and Cosmos Stones' opposite positive/negative "charges" canceling each other out.

== Dinosaurs ==
This is a list of dinosaurs that appear in the dinosaur king anime franchise in order of appearance:

- Triceratops

Name: Gabu (ガブ) / Chomp
Element: Lightning
First Seen in Episode: (1-)
First Activation: Max rubbed a rock that had a lightning bolt on it.
Found in place: In a forest not too far from Max's house
Moves Used: Electric Charge (Lightning). Lightning Spear (Lightning). Lightning Strike (Lightning). Tag Team. Thunder Bazooka (Lightning). Thunder Storm Bazooka (Combined Move with Ace's Cyclone). Plasma Anchor (Lightning). Ultimate Thunder (Lightning). Gatling Spark (Lightning). Thunder Driver (Lightning). Final Thunder (Lightning)
Owned by: Max (D-Team)
Other Info: He enjoys nibbling on things (such as Max's nose) hence the name Chomp, and is the D-Team's strongest main dinosaur (he has been able to beat two or all three of the Alpha Gang's dinosaurs with one move card). His hatchling/adult transformation like all of them (except Terry) starts with the hatchling spinning, then his legs growing in and after that, his brow horns grow and then his nose horn, his eyes shine like all of them and then it ends when he rears up and roars. He has a strong rivalry with Terry.

- Tyrannosaurus

Name: Tyranno (ティラノ, Tirano) / Terry
Element: Fire
First Seen in Episode: (1-)
First Activation: Laura first activated him to attack Dr. Z and Ed for fun.
Found in place: At Zeta Point
Moves Used: Volcano Burst (Fire). Neck Crusher. Tag Team. Tail Smash. Critical Block. Final Fury. Fire Scorcher (Fire). Ultimate Fire (Fire). Heat Eruption (Fire). Magma Blaster (Fire)
Owned by: the Alpha Gang (typically Ursula, Rod or Dr. Z)
Other Info: Terry is the most powerful of the main three Alpha Gang dinosaurs, and although he isn't very smart proves a dangerous opponent, actually proving to be stronger than the D-Teams main dinosaurs. When in its hatchling form, Terry enjoys nibbling on Dr. Z's beard. It is shown in episode 27 that Terry possesses Blazing Spin Attack, but did not get to use it as Rod was interrupted by Helga's return from grocery shopping. His transformation is different from the others because as opposed to spinning his starts with him as a hatchling standing, after that some fire erupts up and then his legs grow in, his tail does, then his teeth his eyes shine and he roars, as more fire erupts. He was used by Dr.Z. and later by Dr. Taylor in Dinosaur War. He has a strong rivalry with Chomp.

- Spinosaurus

Name: Spino (スピノ, Supino) / Spiny
Element: Water
First Seen in Episode: (2-)
First Activation: When the egg that contained its card and Move Card opened, a cup of soda spilled on it.
Found in place: At the Pyramids of Giza, Egypt
Moves Used: Shock Wave (Water), Tail Smash, Futaba Super Cannon (Water), Water Sword (Water), Ultimate Water (Water), Anhanguera Dive, Hydro Cutter (Water)
Owned by: the Alpha Gang (typically Zander)
Other Info: The second of the Alpha Gang's main dinosaurs, which they gained after he was defeated by Terry. When the Alpha Gang summons two dinosaurs for a battle, Spiny is always one of the two dinosaurs, the other commonly being Terry. In the Pterosaur Legend, Dr. Z even experiments with combined moves using Terry's Volcano Burst and Spiny's Shock Wave. He is the alpha gang's fastest and most agile dinosaur, being able to chase and catch other fast dinosaurs such as Megaraptor, Suchomimus, Fukuisaurus, and Ace, and he can even jump extremely long or high without the use of a move card. His transformation is composed of his hatchling approaching the screen, spinning, and then his legs grow in, followed by his sail, his eyes shine and he roars. Like Baryonyx, he is an adept swimmer. He was used by Rod in Dinosaur War. He has a strong rivalry with Paris.

- Carnotaurus

Name: Ace (エース, Ēsu)
Element: Wind
First Seen in Episode: (2-)
First Activation: Rex first activated it to help Chomp fight Terry and Spiny.
Found in place: In Alberta, Canada
Moves Used: Cyclone (Wind), Ninja Attack (Wind), Kagerou (literally "Mayfly"; Wind), Thunder Storm Bazooka (Fusion Move with Lightning's Thunder Bazooka), Ultimate Wind (Wind), Biting Wind (Wind), Hurricane Beat (Wind), Sonic Blast (Wind)
Owned by: Rex (D-Team)
Other Info: Ace was Rex's first dinosaur and was named because of it. He has a strong dislike of water for some reason but is able to overcome this fear in order to save Rex and battle a Baryonyx. Rex sometimes has a hard time controlling him in his hatchling form (possibly because he's the only D-Team's main dinosaur who's a predator, while Chomp and Paris are herbivores). Ace has shown that he can combine his cyclone with water and create a water typhoon. Ace seems to know Acrocanthosaurus. His transformation is the hatchling spinning, his legs grow in, and so do some spikes along his tail and back, his horns grow, his eyes shine and he roars. He is the fastest and most agile of the D-teams main dinosaurs and has shown that he can grab a dinosaur by the tail, then throw them without use of a move card. He has a strong rivalry with Tank.

- Parasaurolophus

Name: Parapara (パラパラ) / Paris
Element: Grass
First Seen in Episode: (2-)
First Activation: Zoe first activated it to help Chomp fight Terry and Spiny.
Found in place: In Alberta, Canada
Moves Used: Nature's Blessing (Grass), Metal Wing (Grass), Stomping Hammer, Big Foot Assault (Grass), Emerald Garden (Grass), Ultimate Leaf (Grass), Green Impulse (Grass)
Owned by: Zoe (D-Team)
Other Info: Paris enjoys singing to music and can use her crest to make sounds of various frequencies in combat. Her transformation is composed of the hatchling spinning her back legs growing in separately like most dinosaurs, and then the front legs growing in together, followed by the crest growing and an eye shine, she then rears up and roars. Paris is named after the type of dinosaur that she is. She has a strong rivalry with Spiny.

- Saichania

Name: Saika (サイカ) / Tank
Element: Earth
First Seen in Episode: (3-)
First Activation: Dirt from a potted plant spilled onto its card.
Found in place: At the London Museum
Moves Used: Dino Swing, Earth Barrier (Earth), Earthquake (Earth), Ultimate Earth (Earth), Quake Saber (Earth), Tupuxuara Dive, Spiked Arrows (Earth)
Owned by: the Alpha Gang (typically Ed or Laura)
Other Info: Originally docile, Dr. Z altered its mind to be aggressive and violent and (s)he was defeated by Terry. Tank was referred to as a male in her initial debut but since then has been referred to as being female. Tank is the first Alpha Gang dinosaur to defeat a "wild" dinosaur that was not of the main Alpha trio (namely Utahraptor). A Terry-Tank team is rare and has only occurred once in each season. Tank enjoys tunneling. Her transformation is composed of a spinning hatchling, legs growing in, spikes growing in an eye shine and her rearing up and roaring (the genus name "Saichania" is mispronounced in the 4Kids dub). She has a strong rivalry with Ace.

- Saltasaurus

Element: Water
First Seen in Episode: (4-)
First Activation: The egg that had its card in it was opened in the Amazon River during a rainstorm.
Found in place: In the Amazon rainforest
Owned by: Max (D-Team)
Other Info: When it chased Max in the Amazon, it thought that the lizard with him was one of its own. It is the first dinosaur to defeat a dinosaur without a move card because apparently Spiny hadn't had breakfast.

- Carcharodontosaurus

Element: Fire
First Seen in Episode: (5-)
First Activation: The egg that its card and Move Card in it opened near the Great Wall of China during a forest fire.
Found in place: Near the Great Wall of China
Move Used: Fire Cannon (Fire)
Owned by: Rex (D-Team)
Other Info: It was activated alongside its Fire Cannon move card allowing him to use it at will. It worked with Ace to defeat Terry, but it turns on Ace and therefore Ace is forced to defeat him.

- Maiasaura

Element: Grass
First Seen in Episode: (6-)
First Activation: The egg holding its card and Move Card opened on the grass
Found in place: In the Swiss Alps with her hatchling
Move Used: Diving Press (Normal)
Owned by: Zoe (D-Team)
Other Info: Unlike other dinosaur cards, she returned to her card form by the D-Team's Dinoholders rather than being defeated in combat. She also helps in the fight against Black Tyrannosaurus.

- Utahraptor

Name: Utah
Element: Wind
First seen in Episode: (7-)
First Activation: The egg that had its card and Move Card in it opened on a pile of rock props at the Dino Troopers set when the wind emitted from a fan prop hit the cards.
Found in place: In a TV studio in Tokyo.
Move Used: Atomic Bomb (Normal)
Owned by: Ursula (Alpha Gang), later Max (D-Team)
Other Info: Utahraptor is the second dinosaur to be controlled by the Alpha Scanner, the first being Tank. It was too fast for Chomp to fight, until Ace countered its Atomic Bomb with Cyclone. It was then defeated by Chomp.

- Styracosaurus

Element: Lightning
First Seen in Episode: (8-)
First Activation: During a thunderstorm when a lightning strikes its card.
Found in place: In Maui, Hawaii
Move Used: Lightning Spear (it was never actually used by him but it was used by Chomp; Lightning).
Owned by: Dr. Z, Ursula, Zander, and Ed (Alpha Gang), later Max (D-Team)
Other Info: He is Chomp's cousin, and gets along well with him. Like Tank, Styracosaurus' personality was altered to be aggressive and violent by Dr. Z. He was defeated by Rex's Ceratosaurus on Zeta Point, and his card was taken by Chomp. Styracosaurus enjoys surfing.

- Ankylosaurus

Element: Earth
First Seen in Episode: (9-)
First Activation: Its card and Move Card was buried under dirt during construction
Found in place: In a subway train station in Japan
Move Used: Mole Attack (Earth)
Owned by: Rex (D-Team)
Other Info: After its activation, it was looking for a quiet place to sleep, but it kept getting disturbed and was driven mad by all the noise. It was defeated by Ace.

- Pteranodon

Element: Grass Super Move Card Dinosaur
First Seen in Episode: (10-)
First Activation: Zoe first activated them to help Paris win a battle against Terry
Found in place: The card dropped out of a Dinosaur Card Book the D-Team and the Alpha Gang were fighting over somewhere in Japan.
Owned by: Zoe (D-Team)
Other Info: Their card is an Assist Move Card with a Metal Wing ability. A few dinosaurs have been able to catch them such as Terry (when he used Tail Smash), Shantungosaurus (with Tupuxuara's Green Impulse), and Isisaurus.

- Suchomimus

Name: Smith (Dainason)
Element: Water
First Seen in Episode: (11-)
First Activation: The egg containing its card was hit by a boat and came in contact with the water.
Found in place: In Monaco
Owned by: Rex (D-Team)
Other Info: It was first mistakenly believed to be a sea monster by the local fishermen. It moves very fast when Rex tried to lure it using a truck loaded with fish. Suchomimus' Dainason name is Sumisu.

- Ceratosaurus

Element: Wind
First Seen in Episode: (12-)
First Activation: Its card was accidentally exposed to Helga's vacuum.
Found in place: At Zeta Point
Owned by: Dr. Z and Zander (Alpha Gang), later Rex (D-Team)
Other Info: It was originally found in a Dinosaur Card Book the D-Team and the Alpha Gang fought over back in episode 10 when Rex slashed it through his Dinoholder. Unlike all the other dinosaurs the Alpha Gang kidnapped, Ceratosaurus' mind was not altered to be violent and aggressive and it never worked for the Alpha Gang since they never used it. After Rex saved Ceratosaurus, he used it to defeat and claim Styracosaurus before they got off Zeta Point. It is the only non-move dinosaur so far to be activated and used by the D-Team apart from their original three Dino-Partners. It is the only D-Team dinosaur known so far to win a battle without a move card. It also helps in the fight against Seth's Black Tyrannosaurus.

- Pachycephalosaurus

Name: Pachy
Element: Secret
First Seen in Episode: (14-)
First Activation: The light that reflected off a house window shined on its card.
Found in place: In Rome, Italy
Move Used: Dynamic Ray (aka: Laser Ray; Secret)
Owned by: Dr. Z (Alpha Gang), later Max (D-Team)
Other Info: It has rainbow color that is seen on its skull roof when Dr. Z experimented on it prior to the series. It recognized Dr. Z when he tried to reclaim it, but attacked him in confusion and later again after he and Ursula set Terry and Spiny on him. For some reason, it was drawn to the light of the sun. The experiment made it so powerful that it easily defeated Terry with Dynamic Ray, but it used up its energy on a second Dynamic Ray trying to clear away the clouds and so reverted to its card form. It worked with Dr. Z in the battle against Seth's Black Tyrannosaurus, though it still didn't like Dr. Z trying to ride on its back.

- Acrocanthosaurus

Name: Acro
Element: Fire
First Seen in Episode: (15-)
First Activation: The egg that its card was in was opened in a hot spring on a fisherman's campfire.
Found in place: Somewhere in the Canadian Arctic Archipelago (specifically on one of the islands near Devon Island).
Owned by: Zander (Alpha Gang), later Rex (D-Team)
Other Info: It first appeared at a volcano and was defeated by Terry. The Alpha Gang claimed its card. After being altered into the Super Alpha Acrocanthosaurus by Dr. Z, it was used by the Alpha Gang to attack the D-Team's hometown. It could breathe fire at any time, but it went out of control. It defeated Chomp and Paris, but was defeated when Rex had Ace combine his Cyclone attack with the nearby water.

- Altirhinus

Element: Grass
First Seen in Episode: (17-)
First Activated: The egg that its card was in fell into a bush.
Found in place: During a soccer game in Rio de Janeiro, Brazil.
Move Used: Super Impact (Grass)
Owned by: Ursula (Alpha Gang), later Zoe and Max (D-Team)
Other Info: The Alpha Gang saw a talent for soccer in Altirhinus when it tried to eat a giant ball of grass. They later managed to get it and Chomp into a game of soccer, using a giant ball made of Alpha Droids, but when they Alpha Gang tried to set the droids on them, it turned out that getting kicked around made them too dizzy to capture them, though they managed to recover later and held down Ace from the fight against Terry. Altirhinus hates the Super Impact move because it makes it feel dizzy (the genus name "Altirhinus" is mispronounced in the 4kids dub).

- Daspletosaurus

Name: Daigo (Dainason)
Element: Fire
First Seen in Episode: (18-)
First Activated: Some sparks of fire flew over its card and landed on the card and Move Card.
Found in place: During a festival at a hotel in Bali, Indonesia.
Move Used: Fire Bomb (Fire)
Owned by: Max and Rex (D-Team)
Other Info: He enjoys dancing to music. It also helps in the fight against Seth's Black Tyrannosaurus. Daspletosaurus possesses Fire Bomb, but never gets to use it successfully as Tank protected itself with Earth Barrier and the Black Tyrannosaurus defeats it in mid-attack.

- Seismosaurus

Element: Grass Super Move Card Dinosaur
First Seen in Episode: (19-)
First Activated: Zoe first activated it to defeat Terry, Spiny, and Tank at Liberty Island as well as preventing Dr. Owen from falling off the Statue of Liberty's head.
Found in place: In New York City
Owned by: Zoe (D-Team)
Other Info: Its card is an Assist Move Card with a Big Foot Assault ability.

- Supersaurus

Element: Grass Super Move Card Dinosaur
First Seen in Episode: (20-)
First Activated: After claiming it from Dewey, Ursula first activates it to help fight the D-Team.
Found in place: In Augusta, Georgia
Owned by: Ursula (Alpha Gang), later Zoe and Max (D-Team)
Other Info: Its card is an Assist Move Card with a Super Impact ability. Unlike its card in the card game, Supersaurus loads the dinosaur onto its neck and flings it toward the opponent dinosaurs.

- Euoplocephalus

Name: Honnah/Euploc
Element: Earth
First Seen in Episode: (21-)
First Activated: The egg containing its card and Move Card got some dirt on it near the Alpha Gang.
Found in place: In a cave in Japan
Move Used: Quake Saber (Earth)
Owned by: Max (D-Team) and Laura (Alpha Gang)
Other Info: Normally timid like Tank had once been, it seemed to have developed an attachment to Amy and fights boldly against Spiny to protect her. It also helps in the fight against Seth's Black Tyrannosaurus.

- Megaraptor

Element: Wind
First Seen in Episode: (22-)
First Activated: Its card blew into the wind after the Alpha Gang's rocket crashed into the runway where it was buried.
Found in place: In an airport in Japan.
Owned by: Max and Rex (D-Team)
Other Info: It also fights against Seth's Black Tyrannosaurus.

- Amargasaurus

Element: Water
First Seen in Episode: (23-)
First Activated: The egg that its card was in is opened underwater.
Found in place: In Loch Ness, Scotland
Owned by: Max (D-Team)
Other Info: It was first mistakenly believed to be the Loch Ness Monster by the local Scottish.

- Anchiceratops

Element: Lightning
First Seen in Episode: (24-)
First Activated: Lightning strikes the area the egg containing its card and Move Card in.
Found in place: In Paris, France
Move Used: Death Grind
Owned by: Max (D-Team)
Other Info: Another one of Chomp's cousins. Chomp helped him escape the noise in Paris so he could calm down (in the original version, Chomp lured the Anchiceratops away from the noise by farting). Like Maiasaura, the D-Team didn't have to defeat him to save him since he returned to a card from passing out after battling Spiny. Anchiceratops possesses Death Grind in which he also farts at Spiny, but this was cut from the 4Kids dub. When Ursula told Dr. Z a lie about a dinosaur in Paris, France, Dr. Z believed her, but called later for a scream at them and then Anchiceratops' card activated.

- Futabasaurus

Name: Futaba
Element: Water Super Move Card Dinosaur
First Seen in Episode: (25-)
First Activated: Ursula first activated it to fend off the D-Team.
Found in place: In the mines of Japan
Owned by: Ursula (Alpha Gang) & Zoe (D-Team)
Other Info: Its card is an Assist Move Card with a Futaba Super Cannon ability. It usually appears surrounded by water when on land. Spiny and Tank turned against it when it fought for the Alpha Gang. Futaba itself then turned against the Alpha Gang after recognizing the Super Move Card Nature Blessing that Zoe equipped Paris with to heal Chomp, the same card she used for Futaba when it had been injured by Spiny and Tank earlier.

- Therizinosaurus

Name: Teddy
Element: Secret
First Seen in Episode: (28-)
First Activated: Sunlight that was reflected off a building shined on its embedded card.
Found in place: At a demolition site in Japan.
Moves Used: Gyro Slasher (aka: Gyro Claw). Nail Blade (Claw Blade) (all Secret Super Moves)
Owned by: Dr. Z (Alpha Gang), later D-Team (from Juan to Rain)
Other Info: Just like the Pachycephalosaurus, Dr. Z also experimented on it and is surrounded in a rainbow aura. It is also attracted to the light of the sun. Unlike the Pachycephalosaurus, it seemed to recognize Dr. Z as its "father" but still turned on him due to his abusive treatment of it (e.g. hit its arm with a hammer when it was hungry, beating it with a rug beater when it wet the bed and making it run with tires strapped to it in an attempt to make it a violent dinosaur) when it was young making it never have a proper childhood, though it saves Dr. Z's life when the two fall off a building. It fights against Seth's Black Tyrannosaurus and uses Gyro Claw.

- Torosaurus

Element: Lightning
First Seen in Episode: (29-)
First Activated: Sparks from a broken lantern in Ungaro's tent activated it and its Move Card after a rhinoceros opened the egg containing them.
Found in place: In the Kenyan Savanna
Move Used: Lightning Strike (with Chomp; Lightning)
Owned by: Max (D-Team)
Other Info: Another one of Chomp's cousins, he was very protective of Chomp out on the Savanna. Torosaurus also had its own Lightning Strike Super Move Card and combined its attack with Chomp's own Lightning Strike against Terry. Like the Anchiceratops, Torosaurus also passed out after battling Terry.

- Saurolophus Duo

Element: Grass
First Seen in Episode: (30-)
First Activated: The first one activated when the card fell on some dry grasses, the second one's card hit a cactus.
Found in place: In Mexico
Owned by: Zander (Alpha Gang), later Zoe and Max (D-Team)
Other Info: There are two of them: one with an orange crest and one with a green crest. Their cards were separated by Zander after he washed up in Mexico.

- Pawpawsaurus

Name: Pawpaw
Element: Normal Move Card Dinosaur
First Seen in Episode: (31-)
First Activated: Ursula first activated it to help Terry.
Found in place: In Peru
Owned by: Ursula (Alpha Gang), later Max (D-Team)
Other Info: Its card is an Assist Move Card with a Tag Team ability. It also appears as a Secret Elemental dinosaur, but it doesn't appear as such in the series. It helped in preventing the Temple of the Moon from collapsing after the Alpha Gang removed the Crystal Skull from its stand in order to get the Alpha Metal within it. Technically, Chomp also used Tag Team to bring it out so the worshipers could thank Pawpawsaurus for saving the temple.

- Baryonyx

Name Lion (Dainason)
Element: Water
First Seen in Episode: (32-)
First Activated: The egg containing its card fell into Niagara Falls.
Found in place: In Niagara Falls
Owned by: Max and Rex (D-Team)
Other Info: It likes to eat fish and mistakes the large fish model on a ship as a real fish. He is an adept swimmer and uses this to his advantage when fighting Ace.

- Deltadromeus

Element: Wind
First Seen in Episode: (33-)
First Activated: When Meena opened its egg, its card got blown by the wind.
Found in place: In India
Owned by: Rex and Max (D-Team)
Other Info: It enjoys swimming in the Ganges River with butterfly style. It befriends an Indian princess named Meena and it swims along with her.

- Deinonychus Trio

Name: Deeno, Dano, and Sue
Element: Secret
First Seen in Episode: (34-)
First Activated: They were first activated when the sun shines at it when it is reflected from the Red Dino Trooper's sword.
Found in place: In a ninja village in Japan
Moves Used: Rolling Attack (aka: Spinning Attack). Cross Cutter (aka: Crossing Attack) (all Secret Super Moves)
Owned by: Dr. Z (Alpha Gang), later Max and Rex (D-Team)
Other Info: The Deinonychus trio are always together. Just like the Therizinosaurus, Dr. Z experimented on them and strictly trains them to become ninjas, but then they started to revolt. Deeno has a large plume on its head, though the other two do not have plumes of their own. Deeno also is the only one of the trio shown on their card as they share one. They help fight against Seth's Black Tyrannosaurus and use Spinning Attack.

- Iguanodon

Name: Iguano
Element: Grass
First Seen in Episode: (35-)
First Activated: Its card fell into a bush after the Alpha Gang landed nearby.
Found in place: At Ayers Rock in Australia
Owned by: Ursula (Alpha Gang), later Zoe and Max (D-Team)
Other Info: It befriends Ursula, but goes insane when Seth aggravates it by flying around it. Despite Ursula having his card, she releases him knowing what Dr. Z would do to it.

- Velociraptor Trio

Name: Dill (Dainason)
Element: Normal Move Card Dinosaur
First Seen in Episode: (35-)
First Activation: Seth first activated them for an experiment after he found it.
Found in place: By Ayers Rock, Australia
Owned by: Seth and Rod (Alpha Gang)
Other Info: The Velociraptor card is an Assist Move Card with a Critical Block and Final Fury abilities. Seth experimented on them to make them stronger, and their card form was changed from a rectangular to a triangular shape that has different moves on each side.

- Saurophaganax

Element: Fire
First Seen in Episode: (37-)
First Activation: It was first activated when a cowboy drops its egg filled with its card and Move card into the fire.
Found in place: In Oklahoma
Moves Used: Magma Blaster (Fire). Death Fire (Fire Scorcher; Fire).
Owned by: Rod and Seth (Alpha Gang), later Max (D-Team)
Other Info: It challenges Chomp and Max in a Cowboy Duel. It is later used by Seth to stop the D-Team and Alpha Gang from stopping his research with the Black Tyrannosaurus by using the Fire Scorcher move that Seth had invented. It is defeated by Chomp and Ace's Thunder Storm Bazooka, but later helps defeat the Black Tyrannosaurus.

- Stegosaurus

Element: Earth
First Seen in Episode: (38-)
First Activation: Its card and Move Card fell on a dirt floor.
Found in place: In Angkor, Cambodia
Move used: Spike Arrow (Spiked Arrows; Earth)
Owned by: Laura and Seth (Alpha Gang) later Max and Rex (D-Team)
Other Info: It is mistaken for a mythical monster from the religion of the locals and was taken down by Chomp and Helga. It helps fight against Seth's Black Tyrannosaurus.

- Mapusaurus

Element: Fire
First Seen in Episode: (39-)
First Activated: Its card and Move Card fell on a cooking pan when Jonathan (in the guise of Johnny Cook) accidentally opened its egg.
Found in place: In Chinatown
Move used: Fire Cannon (Fire)
Owned by: Max (D-Team)
Other Info: It destroyed Max's favorite food and the restaurant causing Chomp to fiercely defeat it.

- Allosaurus

Element: Wind
First Seen in Episode: (40-)
First Activated: Its card and Move Card got blown by the wind
Found in place: In Barcelona, Spain
Move Used: Mayfly (Wind)
Owned by: Max and Rex (D-Team)
Other Info: It likes to eat meat and goes around to steal meat from various butcher shops. Other than Chomp, Ace, Paris, and the dinosaurs activated in the amusement park from episode 27, Allosaurus is the first of the dinosaurs that Aki encounters (who faints when it roars at her to gain access to more meat). It also fights against Seth's Black Tyrannosaurus.

- Pentaceratops

Element: Lightning
First Seen in Episode: (41-)
First Activated: Its card was activated when the lightning struck its card.
Found in place: In Hollywood
Owned by: Max (D-Team)
Other Info: He is another one of Chomp's cousins. He mistook a robotic ceratopsid used by Stanley Spinoberg for one of his own kind and fell in love with it. He got angry when Chomp got near it thinking he was trying to win his "girlfriend" over which forced Chomp to defeat it.

- Ampelosaurus

Element: Water
First Seen in Episode: (42-)
First Activation: Its card and Move Card got activated when its egg falls into the cold water in an ice fishing area.
Found in place: In Moscow
Move Used: Aqua Vortex (Water)
Owned by: Rod (Alpha Gang), later Max and Rex (D-Team)
Other Info: It looked for a warm place to sleep and found one in the form of a box car, chasing the cattle out of it. It got frustrated when Chomp and Ace disturbed its sleep, but it calmed down as it listened to a lullaby from Paris and fell back asleep. It got disturbed again and tried to get away from D-Team's dinosaurs. It later helps in the fight against Seth's Black Tyrannosaurus.

- Fukuisaurus

Element: Grass
First Seen in Episode: (44-)
First Activated: It is first activated when its egg fell onto some grass.
Found in place: In Kyoto, Japan
Move Used: Emerald Garden (Grass)
Owned by: Zoe and Max (D-Team)
Other Info: It is attracted to shiny objects, stealing them from people and storing them in a pagoda in a pond in Kyoto. It helps in the fight against Seth's Black Tyrannosaurus.

- Megalosaurus

Name: Megalo
Element: Secret
First Seen in Episode: (45-)
First Activated: Ursula first activated it to attack the D-Team.
Found in place: In Japan during Christmas Eve.
Moves Used: Zero G Throw. Gigantic Fall (all Secret Super Moves)
Owned by: Dr. Z and Ursula (Alpha Gang), later Max and Rex (D-Team)
Other Info: It is another secret dinosaur that Dr. Z has created. He is the first Secret Dinosaur that is in Dr. Z's possession and is revealed to be the most violent of the secret-element dinosaurs, being it was violent since it was a hatchling and worse as an adult. It helps in the fight against Seth's Black Tyrannosaurus.

- Black Tyrannosaurus

Element: Fire
First Seen in Episode: (48)
First Activated: Seth first activated it to experiment on it.
Found in place: In the Timeship
Move Used: Death Fire (Fire Scorcher; Fire)
Owned by: Seth
Dinosurs defeated: Maiasaura, Ceratosaurus, Megaraptor, Daspletosaurus.
Other Info: It is an altered Tyrannosaurus created by Seth from a complete Tyrannosaurus skeleton to make it even more powerful. It is only defeated by the combined efforts of the D-Team's and Alpha Gang's dinosaurs (including some extra dinosaurs summoned to help out). He is the largest dinosaur in the series. Chomp and the Lightning Dinosaurs were the only element dinosaurs that did not fight the Black Tyrannosaurus as Seth had trapped Max, who alone could control Lightning dinosaurs. Terry tried to attack once sent out, but his eyes grew and his jaw dropped at the first sight of his evil mutated brother.

- Torvosaurus

Element: Fire
First Seen in Episode: (50)
First Activated: Gavro first activated it to attack Dr. Spike Taylor and the parents when the Taylor's house was placed on their timeship.
Found in place: Rome during the Roman Republic
Moves Ever Used: Magma Blaster (Fire)
Owned by: Gavro (Spectral Space Pirates), later Rex and Max (D-Team)

- Majungasaurus

Element: Wind
First Seen in Episode: (52)
First Activated: Foolscap first activated it to help capture Sofia.
Found in place: Rome during the Roman Republic
Moves Ever Used: Kagerou/Mayfly (Wind)
Owned by: Foolscap (Spectral Space Pirates), later Max (D-Team)

- Shunosaurus

Element: Water
First Seen in Episode: (52)
First Activated: Foolscap first activated it to help capture Sofia.
Found in place: Rome during the Roman Republic
Moves Ever Used: Aqua Vortex (Water)
Owned by: Foolscap (Spectral Space Pirates), later Zoe (D-Team)

- Yangchuanosaurus

Name Yang
Element: Fire
First Seen in Episode: (54)
First Activated: Sheer first activated it to attack Spartacus in the Colosseum.
Found in place: Rome during the Roman Republic
Moves Ever Used: Venom Fang (Normal). Burning Dash (Fire)
Owned by: Sheer (Spectral Space Pirates), later Max (D-Team)
Other Info: Sheer called it Yang when she left Sophia in the Space Pod.

- Piatnitzkysaurus

Element: Normal Move Card Dinosaur
First Seen in Episode: (54)
First Activated: Sheer equipped it to Yangchuanosaurus.
Found in place: Rome during the Roman Republic
Owned by: Sheer (Spectral Space Pirates), later Max (D-Team)
Other Info: Its card is an Assist Move Card with a Venom Fang ability.

- Edmontonia

Element: Earth
First Seen in Episode: (55)
First Activated: Gavro first activated it to look for the Cosmos Stone.
Found in place: The Caribbean during the Age of Pirates.
Moves Ever Used: Rock Roller (Earth)
Owned by: Gavro (Spectral Space Pirates), later Dr. Z (Alpha Gang)

- Diceratops

Element: Lightning
First Seen in Episode: (55)
First Activated: Gavro first activated it to fight Rex and Ace.
Found in place: The Caribbean during the Age of Pirates.
Owned by: Gavro (Spectral Space Pirates), later Max and Zoe (D-Team)

- Jobaria

Element: Water
First seen in Episode: (57)
First Activated: Foolscap first activated it to pull Blackbeard's pirate ship through a storm.
Found in place: The Caribbean during the Age of Pirates.
Moves Ever Used: Ocean Panic (Water), Shock Wave (Water)
Owned by: Foolscap (Spectral Space Pirates), later Ursula and Zoe (Alpha Gang and D-Team)

- Ophthalmosaurus Quints

Element: Water Super Move Card Dinosaur
First seen in Episode: (57)
First Activated: Foolscap first activated them to help the Jobaria fight Spiny.
Found in place: The Caribbean during the Age of Pirates.
Owned by: Foolscap (Spectral Space Pirates), later Zoe (D-Team)
Other Info: Their card is an Assist Move Card with an Ocean Panic ability.

- Megaraptor #2

Name: Meg
Element: Wind
First Seen in Episode: (58)
First Activated: Sheer first activated it to attack the D-Team.
Found in place: The Caribbean during the Age of Pirates.
Moves Ever Used: Hurricane Beat (Wind), Ninja Attack (Wind)
Owned by: Sheer (Spectral Space Pirates), later Rex (D-Team)
Other Info: Second Megaraptor to appear in the series.

- Shantungosaurus

Element: Grass
First seen in Episode: (59)
First Activated: Foolscap first activated it to help search for the Cosmos Stone.
Found in place: China during the Tang dynasty.
Moves Ever Used: Green Impulse (Grass)
Owned by: Foolscap (Spectral Space Pirates), later Max (D-Team)

- Tupuxuara

Element: Move Card / Grass Super Move Card
First seen in Episode: (59)
First Activated: Foolscap first activates it to help the Shantungosaurus.
Found in place: China during the Tang dynasty.
Owned by: Foolscap (Spectral Space Pirates), later Zoe and Max (D-Team) and Zander (Alpha Gang)
Other Info: Its card is an Assist Move Card with a Green Impulse and Tupuxuara Dive ability. When the Shantungosaurus used Green Impulse, the move resembled Tupuxuara Dive more. It was properly shown in episode 72 against Gigas.

- Mapusaurus #2

Element: Fire
First Seen in Episode: (60)
First Activated: Sheer first activates it to drive away the woodcutters that disturbed her.
Found in place: China during the Tang dynasty.
Moves Ever Used: Heat Eruption (Fire), Fire Bomb (Fire)
Owned by: Sheer (Spectral Space Pirates), later Max (D-Team)
Other Info: Second Mapusaurus to appear in the series. When Sheer modified it with Heat Eruption, it set off a volcano that endangered a village at the foot of the volcano. Like Daspletosaurus, it never successfully used Fire Bomb.

- Achelousaurus

Element: Lightning
First Seen in episode: (61)
First Activated: Gavro first activates it to attack the Alpha Gang.
Found in place: China during the Tang dynasty.
Moves Ever used: Attack Burst (Normal)
Owned by: Gavro (Spectral Space Pirates)
Other Info: Achelousaurus may have taken by Gavro, but was rescued offscreen when the heroes reclaim the Space Pirates' ship and got send into the future along with the other dinosaurs.

- Lanzhousaurus

Element: Grass
First Seen in episode: (62)
First Activated: Sheer first activated it to attack the D-Team.
Found in place: China during the Tang dynasty.
Moves Ever Used: Power Drain (Normal)
Owned by: Sheer (Spectral Space Pirates), later Rex and Max (D-Team)

- Carcharodontosaurus #2

Element: Fire
First Seen in Episode: (62)
First Activated: Gavro first activated it to attack Tank.
Found in place: China during the Tang dynasty.
Owned by: Gavro (Spectral Space Pirates), later Ed (Alpha Gang)
Other Info: Second Carcharodontosaurus to appear in the series.

- Gojirasaurus

Name: Nightmare (Japanese only)
Element: Wind
First seen in Episode: (63)
First Activated: Sheer first activated it to attack Ieyasu Tokugawa.
Found in place: Japan during the Edo period.
Moves Ever Used: Defense Burst (Normal)
Owned by: Sheer (Spectral Space Pirates), later Rex (D-Team)

- Deinonychus Trio #2

Element: Secret
First seen in Episode: (64)
First Activated: Sheer first activated them to fight Foolscap.
Found in place: Japan during the Edo period.
Moves Ever Used: Rolling Attack, Cross Cutter, Dynamic Galaxy (all Secret Super Moves)
Owned by: Sheer (Spectral Space Pirates), later Rex (D-Team)
Other Info: Second Deinonychus Trio to appear in the series. Sheer attacked Foolscap and his Megalosaurus with Deinonychus Trio.

- Megalosaurus #2

Element: Secret
First seen in Episode: (64)
First Activated: Foolscap first activated it to attack Sheer.
Found in place: Japan during the Edo period.
Moves Ever Used: Gigantic Fall (Secret)
Owned by: Foolscap (Spectral Space Pirates), later Max and Rex (D-Team)
Other Info: Second Megalosaurus to appear in the series. It is the only dinosaur in the second series to not be equipped with Spectral Armor as Sheer's Deinonychus Trio defeated it before Foolscap got the chance to activate it.

- Baryonyx #2

Element: Water
First seen in Episode: (65)
First Activated: Gavro first activated it to attack the D-Team.
Found in place: Japan during the Edo period.
Moves Ever Used: Aqua Whip (Water)
Owned by: Gavro (Spectral Space Pirates), later Max (D-Team)
Other Info: Second Baryonyx to appear in the series.

- Tuojiangosaurus

Element: Earth
First Seen in Episode: (66)
First Activated: Foolscap first activated it to attack the D-Team during the Battle of Sekigahara.
Found in place: Japan during the Edo period.
Moves Ever Used: Quake Saber (Earth)
Owned by: Foolscap (Spectral Space Pirates), later Zoe (D-Team)

- Pentaceratops #2

Element: Lightning
First Seen in Episode: (66)
First Activated: Gavro first activated it to attack the D-Team during the Battle of Sekigahara.
Found in place: Japan during the Edo period.
Owned by: Gavro (Spectral Space Pirates), later Max (D-Team)
Other Info: Second Pentaceratops to appear in the series.

- Isisaurus

Name: Genie
Element: Water
First Seen in Episode: (67)
First Activated: It is first activated when a drop of water fell onto the card.
Found in place: Persia during the Persian Empire.
Moves Ever Used: Hydro Cutter (Water)
Owned by: Zahrah, Sheer (Spectral Space Pirates), and later Max and Rex (D-Team)
Other Info: Zahrah first mistook it for a genie since the egg containing its card was in a lamp she found in a cave when she was captured by the 40 Thieves bandits after her caravan was attacked. Later, Sheer took control of its mind with a mind-control device and used it to attack the Alpha Gang and the D-Team.

- Afrovenator

Element: Wind
First Seen in Episode: (67)
First Activated: Gavro first activated it to help search of the Cosmo Stone.
Found in place: Persia during the Persian Empire.
Moves Ever Used: Tornado Toss (Wind)
Owned by: Gavro (Spectral Space Pirates), later Rex (D-Team)

- Pachyrhinosaurus

Element: Lightning
First Seen in Episode: (68)
First Activated: Foolscap first activated it to attack the D-Team.
Found in place: Persia during the Persian Empire.
Moves Ever Used: Anhanguera Dive (Normal)
Owned by: Foolscap (Spectral Space Pirates), later Max (D-Team)

- Anhanguera

Element: Normal Move Card Dinosaur
First Seen in Episode: (68)
First Activated: Foolscap first activated it to help the Pachyrhinosaurus.
Found in place: Persia during the Persian Empire.
Owned by: Foolscap (Spectral Space Pirates), later Zoe, Max (D-Team) and Ursula (Alpha Gang)
Other Info: Its card is an Assist Move Card with an Anhanguera Dive ability. The genus name Anhanguera is mispronounced in the 4Kids dub.

- Lexovisaurus

Element: Earth
First Seen in Episode: (69)
First Activated: Sheer first activated it to attack the D-Team.
Found in place: Persia during the Persian Empire.
Moves Ever Used: Sand Trap (Earth)
Owned by: Sheer (Spectral Space Pirates), later Rex (D-Team)

- Rajasaurus

Element: Fire
First Seen in Episode: (71)
First Activated: Sheer first activated it to impress Queen Marie de' Medici.
Found in place: 17th Century Paris.
Moves Ever Used: Blazing Spin Attack (Fire)
Owned by: Sheer (Spectral Space Pirates), later Max (D-Team)
Other Info: When it fought Chomp during Sheer and Cardinal Richelieu's search for the "Eye of Gaia", their battle ended up damaging the orphanage that a young d'Artagnan was living in.

- Anchiceratops #2

Element: Lightning
First Seen in Episode: (72)
First Activated: Gavro first activated it to attack Spiny.
Found in place: 17th Century Paris.
Owned by: Gavro (Spectral Space Pirates), later Max (D-Team)
Other Info: Second Anchiceratops to appear in the series.

- Gigas

Element: Fire
First Seen in Episode: (72)
First Activated: Gavro first activated it to help the Anchiceratops.
Found in place: 17th Century Paris.
Moves Ever Used: Spectral Lancer (Jark Lancer; Ultimate Move), Magma Blaster (Fire)
Owned by: Gavro (Spectral Space Pirates)
Other Info: It is an altered Tyrannosaurus created by Seth. Gigas is referred to in the English dub as Gigasaurus. He is the only Spectral Space Pirates' altered dinosaur whose name is not a genus of the dinosaur species.

- Ankylosaurus #2

Element: Earth
First Seen in Episode: (73)
First Activated: Foolscap first activated it to attack the Alpha Gang.
Found in place: 17th Century Paris.
Moves Ever Used: Mole Attack (Earth)
Owned by: Foolscap (Spectral Space Pirates)
Other Info: Second Ankylosaurus to appear in the series. Like the first Ankylosaurus, it also uses Mole Attack and ironically defeats Tank using this Super Move Card.

- Armatus

Element: Earth
First Seen in Episode: (73)
First Activated: Foolscap first activated it to attack the D-Team.
Found in place: 17th Century Paris.
Moves Ever Used: Spectral Stinger (Jark Stinger; Ultimate Move)
Owned by: Foolscap (Spectral Space Pirates)
Other Info: It is an altered Stegosaurus created by Seth.

- Maximus

Element: Lightning
First Seen in Episode: (74)
First Activated: Sheer first activated it to attack Paris and The Musketeers.
Found in place: 17th Century Paris.
Moves Ever Used: Spectral Punisher (Jark Banisher; Ultimate Move)
Owned by: Sheer (Spectral Space Pirates)
Other Into: It is an altered Triceratops created by Seth.

- Apatosaurus

Name: Brontykins (ブロント, Buronto)
Element: Secret
First Seen in Episode: (53 as a hatchling, 76 in full dinosaur form)
First Activated: Spectre first activated it to assist Gigas, Armatus, and Maximus in fighting the D-Team.
Found in place: Spectre's Timeship.
Moves Ever Used: Spectral Destroy (Jark Destroyer; Ultimate Move)
Owned by: Spectre (Spectral Space Pirates)
Other Info: When in its hatchling form, Brontikens is often seen in Spectre's arms.

- Cryolophosaurus

Element: Secret
First Seen in Episode: (77)
First Activated: Seth first activated it to attack the Spectral Space Pirates.
Found in place: A year that took place in Max's early childhood.
Moves Ever Used: Blizzard Smash, Snow Crystal (all Secret Super Moves)
Owned by: Seth
Other Info: It and Brontykins are the Secret Dinosaurs not hostile towards their masters. He manages to freeze Gigas, Maximus, and Armatus with Blizzard Smash.

- Eocarcharia

Element: Fire
First Seen in Episode: (90, DKX)
Moves Ever Used: Omega Phoenix (Ultimate Move).
Owned by: Goma (Shadow Empire).
Other Info: The base Eocarcharia model appears to have the Space Pirate markings on its forehead and shoulders in every version. Even Super Eocarcharia (both before and after going Super) retains the Space Pirate marks. Eocarcharia wears a unique variation of Spectral Armor called "Omega Armor" (or "Jark/Spectral Armor Omega"), being golden yellow and looking like metal bones. There are two "wings" attached to its shoulders that allow the dinosaur to fly during its finishing move. It also appears in Dinosaur King X, S, and new generation.
