= First Calgary Petroleums =

First Calgary Petroleums Ltd.
- Industry: Oil & Gas Drilling & Exploration
- Headquarters: Calgary, Alberta, Canada
- Key people: Shane O'Leary
- Number of employees: 64 (2008)
- Website: www.fcpl.ca

First Calgary Petroleums Ltd. was a Calgary, Alberta based oil and gas company engaged in the exploration for and development and production of petroleum and natural gas in North Africa and the Middle East. It had no domestic holdings. In September, 2005, the company announced that it had a plan in place to move towards production wells in Algeria, driving the share price upwards.

Common shares of First Calgary Petroleums Ltd. used to trade on the Alternative Investments Market (AIM) market of the London Stock Exchange under the symbol FPL and on the Toronto Stock Exchange under the symbol FCP.

On November 21, 2008, ENI S.p.A. completed its acquisition of First Calgary for $923 million in Canadian funds, giving Italy's ENI group better access to reserves under First Calgary's control in Algeria.
