= Rosalie Abella =

Canadian jurist (born 1946)

Rosalie Silberman Abella CC, FRSC
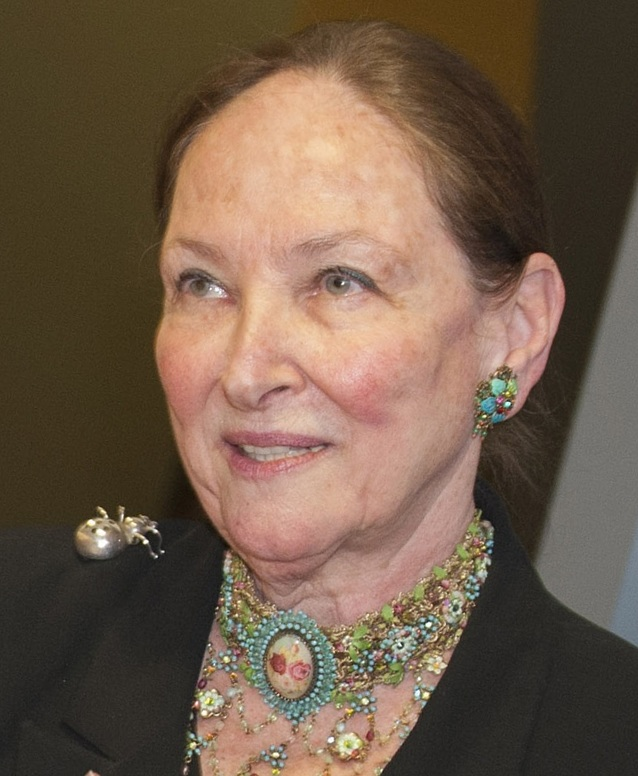

Puisne Justice of the Supreme Court of Canada
- In office October 4, 2004 – July 1, 2021
- Nominated by: Paul Martin
- Preceded by: Frank Iacobucci
- Succeeded by: Mahmud Jamal

Personal details
- Born: July 1, 1946 (age 80) Stuttgart, Allied-occupied Germany
- Spouse(s): Irving Abella (1968–2022, his death)
- Education: University of Toronto (BA, LLB)

Rosalie Silberman Abella CC FRSC (born July 1, 1946) is a Canadian jurist. In 2004, Abella was appointed to the Supreme Court of Canada, becoming the first Jewish woman and refugee to sit on the Canadian Supreme Court bench. She retired from the Supreme Court in 2021.

== Early life and education ==
Rosalie Silberman Abella was born on July 1, 1946, the daughter of Jacob and Fanny (Krongold) Silberman. She was born in a displaced persons camp in Stuttgart, Germany. Her father was born in Sienno, Poland, in 1910, while her mother was born in Ostrowiec in 1917. Abella's older brother was murdered in the Holocaust. Her parents both survived, Jacob Silberman was liberated from Theresienstadt Concentration Camp, Fanny Silberman survived Buchenwald Concentration Camp. Jacob had studied law at the Jagiellonian University in Kraków and was appointed head of legal services for displaced persons in the US Zone of Southwest Germany. In 1950, her family was admitted into Canada, though Jacob Silberman was not allowed to practise law because he was not a citizen.

From a young age, Abella was determined to become a lawyer. She attended Oakwood Collegiate Institute and Bathurst Heights Secondary School in Toronto, Ontario. She then attended the University of Toronto, where she earned a B.A. in 1967 and an LL.B. in 1970. In 1964, Abella graduated from the Royal Conservatory of Music in classical piano.

== Career ==
Abella was called to the Ontario bar in 1972. She practised civil and criminal litigation until 1976, when, at the age of 29, she was appointed to the Ontario Family Court (which is now part of the Ontario Court of Justice) by then–attorney general Roy McMurtry, becoming both the youngest and first pregnant judge in Canadian history. She was appointed to the Ontario Court of Appeal in 1992.

In 1983–1984, Abella served as the sole commissioner of the federal Royal Commission on Equality in Employment (known as the Abella commission), appointed by Lloyd Axworthy. As commissioner, she coined the term and concept of "employment equity", a strategy for reducing barriers in employment faced by women, visible minorities, people with disabilities, and Aboriginal peoples. The theories of equality and discrimination developed in the report were adopted in Andrews v Law Society of British Columbia (1989), the Supreme Court of Canada's first decision regarding equality rights under the Canadian Charter of Rights and Freedoms. Its recommendations report was also adopted by jurisdictions including New Zealand, South Africa, and Northern Ireland.

In 1988, Abella moderated the televised English-language leaders' debate between Brian Mulroney (PC), John Turner (Liberal) and Ed Broadbent (NDP).

Abella has acted as chair of the Ontario Labour Relations Board, the Ontario Study into Access to Legal Services by the Disabled and the Ontario Law Reform Commission, and as a member of the Ontario Human Rights Commission and of the judicial inquiry into the Donald Marshall, Jr. case. From 1988 to 1992, she taught at McGill University Faculty of Law as the Boulton Visiting Professor.

In 2004, Prime Minister Paul Martin appointed Abella to the Supreme Court of Canada. Abella became the first Jewish woman to sit on the court. She was eligible to serve on the Supreme Court until July 1, 2021, when she turned 75. In February 2021, she announced that she would retire on that date, and Prime Minister Justin Trudeau started the selection process of a new justice who would succeed her. Mahmud Jamal was selected as her replacement, and assumed office on July 1, 2021. Following her retirement from the Supreme Court, Abella has served as a visiting professor at Fordham University School of Law and Harvard Law School.

Abella is an authority on constitutional law and human rights law. Her opinions often cite foreign and international law. According to Sian Elias, they are regarded as authoritative by judges in many common law countries.

== Personal life ==
Abella is the widow of historian Irving Abella, and has two sons.

== Recognition and honours ==
=== Order of Canada ===
- Companion of the Order of Canada (2025). This is the highest level of the Order of Canada, one of the country's most prestigious civilian honours. Abella received it in recognition of her contributions to Canadian law and to the development of human rights and equality in the courts.

=== National honours ===
- Queen Elizabeth II Golden Jubilee Medal (2002), awarded to Canadians who made important contributions to their communities and to the country.
- Queen Elizabeth II Diamond Jubilee Medal (2012), a commemorative honour recognizing notable service to Canada.

=== Academic honours ===
- Abella has received at least 38 honorary degrees.
- Yale University honorary Doctor of Laws (2016). She became the first Canadian woman to receive an honorary law degree from Yale.
- University of Saskatchewan honorary Doctor of Laws (2023).

=== Scholarly societies ===
- Royal Society of Canada (Fellow, 1997), recognizing distinguished achievement in scholarship and public life.
- American Academy of Arts and Sciences (foreign honorary member, 2007).
- American Philosophical Society (member, 2018).

=== Professional recognition ===
- Global Jurist of the Year (2016), awarded by the Northwestern University Pritzker School of Law Center for International Human Rights in recognition of Abella's influence on human rights law.

=== Other recognition ===
- Abella has served as a judge for the Giller Prize.

=== Cultural recognition ===
- The documentary film Without Precedent: The Supreme Life of Rosalie Abella, directed by Barry Avrich, premiered on May 1, 2023, at the Hot Docs Canadian International Documentary Festival.

== See also ==
- Reasons of the Supreme Court of Canada by Justice Abella
