= Forward Commitment Procurement =

Forward Commitment Procurement (FCP) is a procurement model designed to be used to deliver cost-effective environmental products and services to the public sector and help to create the market conditions in which the environmental goods and services sector can thrive.

== Model ==
The model was conceived and developed by the UK Government's Environmental Innovation Advisory Group (EIAG) 2003–2008) to address a key market failure identified by EIAG, namely the lack of market pull for environmental innovations.

The first report of EIAG identified the Government as a key player in the environmental market, with a special responsibility as custodian of the common good to provide intelligent and effective supply chain management that could help to unlock investment in new environmental products and services.

As such, the public sector provides a lead market for environmental products and services, and this, coupled with the fact that the Government is a major purchaser of environmental goods and services, led EIAG to focus its activities on "how Government and its agencies can improve on the way they manage the supply chain in this sector" Jack Frost, Chairman of EIAG (2003–2008).

In essence then, our analysis turns the problem of innovation on its head. It is the lack of credible articulated demand that is at the root of the relative failure of innovation in the UK environmental goods and services sector not any lack of research, invention or innovative aspirations. EIAG believes the solution lies in Government taking action to mobilise the supply chain to deliver environmental innovations. And this means moving from a focus on R&D and technology push to a focus on intelligent supply chain management.

== Definition ==
The Forward Commitment Procurement model involves providing the market with advance information of future needs in outcome terms, early engagement with potential suppliers and - most importantly - the incentive of a Forward Commitment: an agreement to purchase a product or service that currently does not exist, at a specified future date, providing it can be delivered to agreed performance levels and costs.

The Forward Commitment Procurement (FCP) Model. The FCP concept is simple and addresses a common "catch 22". Sustainability objectives often require new products that are either not available in the market or are available at excessive cost. These products do not receive the investment required to enter and be competitive in the market because the need for them is not expressed to suppliers in a credible way.

By making the market aware of genuine needs and requirements and offering to buy products which meet these needs once they are available at a price commensurate with their benefits we can unlock this stalemate and unlock investment.

Essentially, FCP is a tool to allocate and manage risk more effectively. It achieves this by providing business with crucial market information on performance and price coupled with assurances on future sales to reduce market risks.

This enables business to invest against technical/development risk which it is best placed to handle. The results in the customer getting what it needs, when it wants it at an affordable price. If suppliers cannot deliver to the required specification, the customer is no worse off (other than opportunity costs) and continues to purchase the existing technology.

EIAG developed FCP as a supply chain management tool primarily for use by public sector policy makers and procurers, although the approach it is equally relevant to, and has been picked up by, private sector bodies such as the New Swindon Company in a project concerning innovative combined cooling, heat and power (CCHP) plant and services. FCP in fact mirrors the approach taken by businesses to stimulate suppliers to invest in new products and services to meet their future needs.

Private sector companies actively manage their supply chains by clearly articulating their future needs and providing a credible promise of future sales to provide security their suppliers need in order to make investments.

"The public sector, as both custodian of the common good and a major purchaser of environmental goods and services, is a natural lead market for environmental products and services. JERA have pioneered FCP as a practical mechanism to enable public sector organisations to fulfill this role, while at the same time delivering the cost effective solutions they need to pressing problems such as climate change and economic and social sustainability" - Gaynor Whyles, Director JERA Consulting.

The FCP approach has been well received:

- FCP was recommended by the UK Sustainable Procurement Task Force and adopted by the UK Government in their Sustainable Procurement Action Plan .
- The Commission on Environmental Markets and Economic Performance called for the UK Government to scale up and replicate the FCP model in the public sector.
- The EIAG FCP demonstration project (see below) was highlighted by HM Treasury in the publication Transforming Government Procurement, as an example of how innovation can be harnessed to improve services and value for money .
- FCP was highlighted as a best practice case study in Finding and Procuring Innovative Solutions.

== The EIAG Forward Commitment Procurement Project ==
The Forward Commitment Procurement project (managed on behalf BERR and DEFRA by Gaynor Whyles of JERA Consulting Ltd (previously JPS Consulting) from June 2005) set out to design and test a supply chain management tool for the public sector, in line with public procurement regulations, that would create the necessary market pull for environmental products and services and hence create the conditions that would support investment in the environmental industries sector.

The project involved:

- designing a supply chain management approach and procurement process that was in line with public procurement regulations
- testing this through a demonstration project
- designing a mechanism to enable the scale up and replication of the approach.

The EIAG FCP demonstration project was undertaken in partnership with Her Majesty's Prison Service (HMPS) and the Office of Government Commerce (OGC). The OGC's role was to provide professional public procurement expertise and advice to the EIAG Project Manager to ensure that the FCP model was compliant with public procurement regulations and reflected best practice. The FCP model built upon and made practical guidance published by OGC in its information leaflet entitled Capturing Innovation (OGC, 2004).

== Process ==
Although all FCP projects are unique, they usually involve:

- identification of an unmet need
- placing this need in the context of a procurement i.e. a market opportunity
- offering a forward commitment contract where required
- articulating the requirement in outcome terms to potential suppliers, providing sufficient time for the market to respond
- assisting the development of a supply chain
- providing the supply chain with information on, and where possible a route to, the wider market
- using outcome based procurement specifications
- ensuring procurement processes are accessible to and do nor preclude small and medium-sized companies
- use of the competitive dialogue process
- use of a forward commitment procurement contract where required

Forward Commitment Procurement works best where there is:

- a high level of leadership and staff commitment
- a genuine need that current technology, products or commercial models cannot deliver
- and / or cannot be delivered affordably
- a procurement opportunity sufficient scale to stimulate the delivery of a solution
- the ability to make a forward commitment of sufficient strength to generate the required market pull
- potential for aggregation of demand within the organisation, region, and with other public sector bodies

== Examples ==
=== Demonstration project: the zero waste prison mattress ===
HMPS were buying around 60,000 highly flame retardant, polyurethane foam mattresses and pillows per year and disposing of around 40,000, mainly to landfill, but with a significant number also being disposed of as clinical waste. The combined cost of supply and disposal was estimated to be well in excess of £3 million per year. In short, the way in which mattresses were disposed of was costly, environmentally unsustainable and out of step with HMPS sustainable development policy. There had been several attempts to find a solution none of which had delivered a meaningful result. HMPS had an 'unmet need' for a cost-effective and environmentally sustainable solution.

Further consideration of the problem led HMPS to identify the following requirement:

HMPS aspires to a zero waste prison mattress that meets or exceeds current operational requirements and delivers whole life cycle cost efficiencies. By 2012, HMPS wants all its mattresses and pillows not classified as hazardous waste to be recycled, repurposed or reused instead of going to landfill; and to reduce to 2 per cent pa the number of mattresses disposed of as hazardous or clinical waste.

This requirement was then communicated to the market in a market sounding exercise in the form of a 'call for innovation and information', designed and managed by the EIAG FCP team. (Note: Market sounding is a way of "assessing the reaction of the market to a proposed requirement and procurement approach, in order to bring supplier perspectives to public sector procurements at an early stage".) This exercise involved the publication of a Prior Information Notice in the Official Journal of the European Union and the engagement of intermediaries, such as the BERR funded Knowledge Transfer Networks, trade bodies and similar, to communicate notification of the call to the potential supply chain.

Detailed information on the requirement, the context for the call and the scale of the market opportunity were provided in a market sounding prospectus, and HMPS offered to consider a 'forward commitment contract' to enable the take up of innovative solutions.

Over 36 high quality responses were received, and from which a range of options were identified. A directory of companies and organisations that responded to the call was published on the HMPS procurement website to assist supply chain development and a "concept viability" workshop was held with a cross section of the supply chain members who submitted responses to discuss the options available and inform the HMPS mattress procurement strategy.

The market engagement process led HMPS to adopt a completely different approach to the procurement of its mattresses and pillows. HMPS is at the concluding stages of a procurement exercise for a 'cradle to cradle' managed service to supply zero waste mattresses and pillows. The final stage of evaluation is underway and HMPS is confident that all of the shortlisted bids will be able to deliver the requirement (see above), and in addition estimates that it will save between £3-£5 million over the life of the contract.

"Sustainable procurement has been talked about for years but the Prison Service launching a competition for zero waste mattresses was one of the few truly innovative examples CEMEP came across."

=== Later projects ===
As of May 2008, a number of FCP projects were getting underway. These projects involved NHS Trusts, the NHS Purchasing and Supply Agency (NHS PASA), South West Regional Development Agency (SWRDA), Swindon Borough Council, New Swindon Company, and are addressing a range of environmental unmet needs such as ultra efficient lighting systems, innovative CCHP, water efficiency, and sustainable waste management solutions.
