= List of Supreme Court of Canada cases (Wagner Court) =

This is a chronological list of notable cases decided by the Supreme Court of Canada from the appointment of Richard Wagner as Chief Justice of Canada in 2017 to the present.

== 2018–present ==
Case name	Citation	Date	Subject
December 18, 2017 - Appointment of Richard Wagner as Chief Justice of Canada
R v Comeau	2018 SCC 15	April 19, 2018	Interprovincial trade under Constitution Act, 1867
Reference re Pan‑Canadian Securities Regulation	2018 SCC 48	November 9, 2018	Cooperative federalism; constitutionality of pan-Canadian securities regulation
Frank v Canada (AG)	2019 SCC 1	January 10, 2019	Voting rights of citizens living abroad for over 5 years
Nevsun Resources Ltd v Araya	2020 SCC 5	February 28, 2020	Liability arising from breaches of customary international law
Reference re Greenhouse Gas Pollution Pricing Act	2021 SCC 11	March 25, 2021	Constitutionality of federal carbon pricing standards
York University v Canadian Copyright Licensing Agency (Access Copyright)	2021 SCC 32	July 30, 2021	Copyright collectives and of fair dealing in Canadian copyright law
R v Bissonnette	2022 SCC 23	May 27, 2022	Constitutionality of life imprisonment without realistic possibility of parole
Murray‑Hall v Quebec (Attorney General)	2023 SCC 10	April 14, 2023	Extent of double aspect doctrine, where federal and provincial laws may take different approaches, while sharing a common purpose.

== See also ==
- List of notable Canadian Courts of Appeals cases
