= Reference re Pan‑Canadian Securities Regulation =

- Supreme Court of Canada

Hearing: 22 March 2018 Judgment: 9 November 2018
- Full case name: IN THE MATTER OF a Reference by the Government of Quebec to the Court of Appeal of Quebec for hearing and consideration of the questions set out in Order in Council 642-2015 concerning the constitutionality of the implementation of pan-Canadian securities regulation
- Citations: 2018 SCC 48
- Docket No.: 37613
- Prior history: APPEALS from Renvoi relatif à la réglementation pancanadienne des valeurs mobilières, 2017 QCCA 756, AZ-51390705; [2017] CarswellQue 4199; [2017] QJ 5583 (10 May 2017), in the matter of a reference concerning the constitutionality of the implementation of pan‑Canadian securities regulation.
- Ruling: The appeals of the Attorney General of Canada and of the Attorney General of British Columbia are allowed. The appeal of the Attorney General of Quebec is dismissed.

Holding
- 1. The Constitution authorizes the implementation of pan-Canadian securities regulation under the authority of a single regulator in accordance with the terms set out in the Memorandum, as the Cooperative System cannot improperly fetter the legislatures' sovereignty.; 2. The legislature has the broad authority to delegate administrative powers, including the power to make legally binding rules and regulations, to a subordinate body, even if some members of that body are representatives of certain provinces.

Court membership
- Chief Justice: Richard Wagner; Puisne Justices: Rosalie Abella, Michael Moldaver, Andromache Karakatsanis, Clément Gascon, Suzanne Côté, Russell Brown, Malcolm Rowe, Sheilah Martin

Reasons given
- Unanimous reasons by: The Court

Reference re Pan‑Canadian Securities Regulation, 2018 SCC 48 is a landmark decision of the Supreme Court of Canada, dealing with the Canadian doctrine of cooperative federalism and how it intersects with the power of the Parliament of Canada over trade and commerce, as well as discussing the nature of parliamentary sovereignty in Canada.

== Background ==
Canadian securities regulation is unique in that Canada is the only industrialized country in the world without a national securities regulator, and thus the field is solely regulated by provincial and territorial governments. While those governments have worked to harmonize many of their policies, there is still enough variation that securities issuers must reconcile in order to have their securities trade among residents in each of the jurisdictions involved.

Since the 1930s, (Note: see the Report of the Royal Commission on Price Spreads. Ottawa: King's Printer. 1935. pp. 43–45. hdl:2027/mdp.39015067005606.) there has been debate about the desirability of establishing a single national securities regulator, but serious discussions only began in 1964. In 2010, a draft Canadian Securities Act was published, on which a reference question was posed to the Supreme Court of Canada on its constitutionality. In Reference re Securities Act, the Court ruled that the proposed Act overreached genuine national concerns, and thus intruded too far into the provincial power over property and civil rights.

Certain observers agreed that a national regulatory authority with a more focused brief was still possible under other heads of federal power, as was the option of instituting a cooperative framework with the provinces. There was debate as to the likelihood of the provinces' cooperation. In January 2012, Minister of Finance Jim Flaherty stated that work was still continuing with the provinces to create a national regulator that would function within the bounds that the Court declared was within federal jurisdiction. In September 2014, his successor Joe Oliver announced that agreement had been reached with several of the provinces to create a Cooperative Capital Markets Regulatory System, and a memorandum of understanding was signed to that effect.

The memorandum contemplated:

- the passage of a federal Capital Markets Stability Act, aimed at preventing and managing systemic risk, as well as establishing criminal offences relating to financial markets
- the passage by the participating provinces and territories of a "Model Provincial Act", dealing primarily with the day-to-day aspects of the securities trade
- a "Capital Markets Regulatory Authority", drawing its authority from the federal and provincial Acts, to act as a national securities regulator
- a Council of Ministers, (Note: comprising the ministers responsible for capital markets regulation in each participating province and the federal Minister of Finance) which would supervise the Authority, recommend amendments to the Model Provincial Act, and make regulations by authority of both the federal and provincial Acts

== Quebec reference ==
Although not a signatory to that memorandum, the Government of Quebec in July 2015 posed the following reference questions to the Quebec Court of Appeal:

1. Does the Constitution of Canada authorize the implementation of pan-Canadian securities regulation under the authority of a single regulator, according to the model established by the most recent publication of the Memorandum of Agreement regarding the Cooperative Capital Markets Regulatory System?
2. Does the most recent version of the draft of the federal Capital Markets Stability Act exceed the authority of the Parliament of Canada over the general branch of the trade and commerce power under subsection 91(2) of the Constitution Act, 1867?

In May 2017, the Court of Appeal responded in a 4-1 decision, answering:

1. No.
2. No, except with respect to its sections 76–79 concerning the role and powers of the Council of Ministers which, if not removed, render the act unconstitutional as a whole.

For his part, Schrager JA declined to answer the first question, and answered No to the second.

Three appeals were lodged with the Supreme Court of Canada:

- the Attorney General of Canada with respect to both questions
- the Attorney General of British Columbia with respect to the first question
- the Attorney General of Quebec with respect to the second question

== At the Supreme Court ==
In November 2018, the Court allowed the first two appeals and dismissed the third in handing down a unanimous decision, giving as its answers to the questions posed:

1. Yes.
2. No.

=== Cooperative federalism ===
==== Does it improperly fetter the legislatures' sovereignty? ====
The MOU expressly contemplated that the objective was "to establish a unified and cooperative system for the regulation of capital markets in Canada in a manner that accords with the constitutional division of powers":

In entering into this [Memorandum] and participating in the Cooperative System, each of the Participating Jurisdictions is addressing matters within its constitutional jurisdiction and is neither surrendering nor impairing any of its jurisdiction, with respect to which it remains sovereign.

The Court held that this was an important point to be made:

This is key: nowhere does the Memorandum imply that the legislatures of the participating provinces are required to implement the amendments made to the Model Provincial Act that have been approved by the Council of Ministers, or that they are precluded from making any other amendments to their securities laws.

Therefore, the proposition that this framework fettered the participating provinces' law-making powers was rejected.

The Court also noted that the majority in the Court of Appeal misunderstood the nature of parliamentary sovereignty, pointing out that, since Hodge v The Queen, "the sovereignty of Parliament and of the provincial legislatures has been limited in Canada since Confederation." An important corollary, as noted in the Reference re Anti-Inflation Act, is that "the executive cannot unilaterally fetter the legislature's law-making power." That was also noted to be the case for treaties entered into by the Government of Canada, which cannot bind the provinces without them passing implementing legislation (as noted by the Judicial Committee of the Privy Council in the Labour Conventions Reference). Because of this jurisprudence:

[62] When an action of the executive branch appears to clash with the legislature's law-making powers, parliamentary sovereignty can be invoked for the purpose of determining the legal effect of the impugned executive action, but not its underlying validity. For example, the executive of one province may act within the confines of its constitutional authority when entering into an intergovernmental agreement with that of another province. If a term in such an agreement purports to bind the province's legislature, the result is not that the agreement itself is constitutionally invalid; the principle of parliamentary sovereignty simply means that the legislature's hands cannot be tied, and therefore that the impugned term is ineffective. In other words, because the legislature's law-making powers are supreme over the executive, the latter cannot bind the former. The result is that any executive agreement that purports to fetter the legislature is not inherently unconstitutional, but will quite simply not have the desired effect.

Therefore, "the principle of parliamentary sovereignty is precisely what preserves the provincial legislatures' right to enact, amend and repeal their securities legislation independently of the Council of Ministers' approval," and "legislatures in Canada are constrained only by the Constitution — and are otherwise free to enact laws that they consider desirable and politically appropriate."

==== Delegation of law-making authority ====
While Parliament and the legislatures may delegate subordinate law-making powers to a person or administrative body, (Note: where statutory schemes often merely "set out the legislature's basic objects", such that "most of the heavy lifting [gets] done by regulations, adopted by the executive branch of government under orders-in-council") they have no power to transfer to another legislature the primary power to legislate As "[n]either the Memorandum nor the Model Provincial Act empowers the Council of Ministers to unilaterally amend the provinces' securities legislation," and "no part of the Cooperative System imposes any legal limit on the participating provinces' legislative authority to enact, amend and repeal their respective securities laws as they see fit," the proposed Council of Ministers will not possess primary legislative authority, and is thus considered constitutional.

=== Trade and commerce power ===
==== Pith and substance ====
Citing their previous concerns raised in Reference re Securities Act, and employing the criteria first employed in General Motors of Canada Ltd v City National Leasing to determine whether a federal law is a valid exercise of the "general" trade and commerce power, the Court observed:

| General Motors indicia | Finding |
|---|---|
| (1) Is the law part of a general regulatory scheme? | "Neither of the first two indicia is at issue here: it is common ground that the Draft Federal Act creates a general regulatory scheme that operates under the oversight of a regulatory agency." |
| (2) Is the scheme under the oversight of a regulatory agency? | "Neither of the first two indicia is at issue here: it is common ground that the Draft Federal Act creates a general regulatory scheme that operates under the oversight of a regulatory agency." |
| (3 Is the law concerned with trade as a whole rather than with a particular industry? | "We accept that preservation of capital markets to fuel Canada's economy and maintain Canada's financial stability is a matter that goes beyond a particular "industry" and engages "trade as a whole" within the general trade and commerce power as contemplated by the General Motors test. Legislation aimed at imposing minimum standards applicable throughout the country and preserving the stability and integrity of Canada's financial markets might well relate to trade as a whole." |
| (4) Is the scheme of such a nature that the provinces, acting alone or in concert, would be constitutionally incapable of enacting it? | "While provinces have the capacity to legislate in respect of systemic risk in their own capital markets, they do so from a local perspective and therefore in a manner that cannot effectively address national concerns which transcend their own respective concerns." |
| (5) Would a failure to include one or more provinces or localities in the scheme jeopardize its successful operation in other parts of the country? | "On lesser regulatory matters the answer might well be no. However, when it comes to genuine national goals, related to fair, efficient and competitive markets and the integrity and stability of Canada's financial system, including national data collection and prevention of and response to systemic risks — the answer must be yes — much for the reasons discussed under the fourth question. On these matters a federal regime would be qualitatively different from a voluntary interprovincial scheme." |

The proposed framework therefore falls within the scope of the trade and commerce power.

==== Delegation to the Council of Ministers ====
In addition, the ability of the proposed Council of Ministers to make subordinate legislation is not an issue, and the Court endorsed Schrager JA's views in the matter:

Parliament is free to delegate ... and such regard to constitute the body ... to whom it delegates regulatory functions. Parliament may determine the internal workings of such body and the process of approval of the regulations it proposes. The fact that the body approving the regulations (i.e. the Council [of Ministers]) is populated with ministers of provincial governments does not invalidate the delegation. Parliament can choose to structure the internal mechanics and approval process of the regulatory body in such manner deemed appropriate to the task.

Therefore, the Draft Federal Act would be constitutionally valid when passed.

=== Limits on the opinion ===
The Court warned that its ruling was not exhaustive on the subject:

[130] Again, however, we note that our advisory opinion is limited to the constitutionality of the Cooperative System. It is up to the provinces to determine whether participation is in their best interests. This advisory opinion does not take into consideration many of the political and practical complexities relating to this Cooperative System, and in particular those that may arise if a Participating Jurisdiction decides to withdraw at some later date. Moreover, with respect to the content of the Authority's enabling statute (which has not yet been published), we note that it will have to be carefully drafted so as to respect the limits on overlapping, yet distinct federal and provincial authority.

[131] When and whether to relinquish a degree of autonomy over the regulation of securities for the purpose of achieving national uniformity is entirely a matter of political choice. This too is a valid exercise of parliamentary sovereignty. The various jurisdictions have an unquestioned and equally sovereign right to join or to reject the Cooperative System.

== Aftermath ==
One commentator noted that the Court "walked a tight line to ensure that the principles of federalism are upheld," and thus avoiding the consequences arising in the Securities Act Reference. As only five provinces and one territory (Note: Ontario, British Columbia, Saskatchewan, Prince Edward Island, New Brunswick, and the Yukon) have come on board to date for the new scheme, "[t]he willingness of other provinces and territories to join the regime will be indicative of its overall success."

Previous commentary on Reference re Securities Act had noted that the third GM indicia on "trade as a whole" was considered to be the decisive factor that rendered the proposed law unconstitutional, because any proposed law under the trade and commerce power "must be qualitatively different from provincial powers, and not merely different in the relative effectiveness of federal regulation." In that respect, the fourth and fifth GM indicia are now "relevant only to the extent that they identify a constitutional 'gap' that transcends the local." The incorporation of the Securities Act reasoning appears to confirm that this is now the current line of jurisprudence for assessing the federal power in this field.

== See also ==
- Reference re Securities Act
- General Motors of Canada Ltd v City National Leasing
