= Carbon pricing in Canada =

Carbon pricing in Canada is implemented either as a regulatory fee or as a tax levied on the carbon content of fuels at the provincial, territorial, or federal level. Provinces and territories of Canada are allowed to create their own systems of carbon pricing as long as they comply with the minimum requirements set by the federal government; individual provinces and territories thus may have higher taxes than the federally mandated one but not a lower one. Currently, all provinces and territories are subject to a carbon pricing mechanism, either by an in-province program or by one of two federal programs. As of April 2024, the federal minimum tax was set at CA$80 per tonne of CO_{2} equivalent, set to increase to CA$170 in 2030.

In the absence of a provincial system, or in provinces and territories whose carbon pricing system does not meet federal requirements, a regulatory fee is implemented by the federal Greenhouse Gas Pollution Pricing Act (GHGPPA), which passed in December 2018. In provinces where the fee is levied, 90% of the revenues are returned to taxpayers. The carbon tax is levied because of a need to combat climate change, which resulted in federal commitments to the Paris Agreement. According to NASA's Jet Propulsion Laboratory (JPL), the air today contains 400 ppm of CO_{2}, while the average CO_{2} level over the past 400,000 years was between 200 and 280 ppm.

Saskatchewan never had a carbon pricing system, and other provinces—Manitoba, Ontario, New Brunswick, and Alberta—have opted out of previous provincial carbon tax systems. Revenue from the federal GHGPPA, which came into effect in April 2019, is redistributed to the provinces, either through tax credits to individual residents or to businesses and organizations that are affected by the tax but are unable to pass on the cost by raising consumer prices.

The introduction of the tax was met with political resistance, mainly by the Conservative Party of Canada, which attempted to "make the carbon tax the single issue" of the 2019 federal election campaign. This argument did not succeed, as the Canadian voting public supported parties that also supported the carbon tax, leading CBC News to declare Canada's carbon tax to be "the big election winner" and "the only landslide victor" in the election. Similarly, legal challenges to the law failed on March 25, 2021, when the Supreme Court of Canada rejected the 2019 appeal of the provinces of Manitoba, Ontario, Alberta, and Saskatchewan, ruling in Reference re Greenhouse Gas Pollution Pricing Act that the GHGPPA was constitutional.

In 2024, amidst an affordability crisis, carbon pricing became an increasingly divisive policy. Following a government crisis, prime minister Justin Trudeau resigned pending the results of a leadership election, which was won by Mark Carney. On March 14, 2025, in his first act as prime minister, Mark Carney signed a prime ministerial directive to effectively remove the federal consumer carbon tax implemented via the GHGPPA by setting it to 0% effective April 1, 2025. However, the industrial carbon tax still remains in place.

== History ==
=== 2003: Alberta becomes first jurisdiction in North America to put price on carbon ===
In 2003, Alberta signaled its commitment to manage greenhouse gas emissions by passing the Climate Change and Emissions Management Act. One of the first actions taken under the legislation was to develop a mandatory reporting program for large emitters in Alberta. In March 2007, Alberta passed Specified Gas Emitters Regulation. The first compliance cycle was from July 1 to December 31, 2007.

=== 2007: Quebec implements first carbon tax ===
In June 2007, Quebec implemented the first carbon tax in Canada, which was expected to generate $2 million annually. On December 11, 2008, ExxonMobil CEO Rex Tillerson said that a carbon tax is preferable to a cap-and-trade program, which "inevitably introduces unnecessary cost and complexity". A carbon tax is "a more direct, more transparent and more effective approach". Tillerson added that he hoped that the revenues from a carbon tax would be used to lower other taxes so as to be revenue neutral.

=== 2008: Dion election proposal ===
An unpopular revenue-neutral carbon tax was proposed during the 2008 Canadian federal election by Stéphane Dion, then leader of the Liberal Party. It was the main plank of Dion's platform and allegedly contributed to the defeat of the Liberal Party, which at the time won its lowest-ever share of the popular vote in the country's history. The Conservative Party, which won the 2008 election, had promised to implement a North America–wide cap-and-trade system for greenhouse gases. During the 2008 Canadian federal election, the Conservative Party promised to develop and implement greenhouse gas emissions trading by 2015, also known as cap and trade, to encourage certain behaviours through economic incentives regarding the control of emissions and pollution.

=== 2014: Ecofiscal Commission ===
In 2014, public policy economists and superannuated politicians came together to begin discussions on what would become Canada's Ecofiscal Commission. The commission was established with the participation of Paul Martin, Jim Dinning, Preston Manning, and Jack Mintz on November 4, 2014, and became the leading advocacy group in Canada for carbon pricing. It published reports in 2015, 2016, and 2017.

=== 2015: Trudeau pledges to act if elected ===
In February 2015, Justin Trudeau announced that he would impose carbon pricing if elected. Trudeau's proposed system would resemble the Medicare model, in which provinces would design systems suitable for their needs, with the federal government setting national targets and enforcing principles.

=== 2016: Paris Agreement ===
The Paris Agreement (French: Accord de Paris) is an agreement within the United Nations Framework Convention on Climate Change (UNFCCC), dealing with greenhouse-gas-emissions mitigation, adaptation, and finance, signed in 2016. The agreement's language was negotiated by representatives of 196 state parties at the 21st Conference of the Parties of the UNFCCC in Le Bourget, near Paris, France, and adopted by consensus on December 12, 2015. Under the Paris Agreement, each country must determine, plan, and regularly report on the contribution that it undertakes to mitigate global warming. No mechanism forces a country to set a specific target by a specific date.

A special report by The Guardian in partnership with Climate Action Tracker compared pledges made by some 200 countries that participated in the 2015 United Nations round of talks on a "new climate deal" hosted in Paris. The co-authors wrote an in-depth analysis of 14 key countries and blocs, including Canada. The article, which summarized the report, said that Canada's climate targets were the "weakest ... of any major industrialised economy which experts say was a "direct result" of Stephen Harper government's hard line policies" and its "promotion" of the "vast reserves of tar sands in Alberta" that are highly polluting". By December 2016, the ten provinces and the Canadian government presented their "executive, mitigation and adaptation" strategies towards a clean economy. The "extensive document"—"Pan-Canadian Framework on Clean Growth and Climate Change"—"lean[-ed] heavily on carbon pricing".

In 2018, Canada passed the GHGPPA, implementing a revenue-neutral carbon tax starting in 2019, which applies only to provinces whose carbon pricing systems does not meet federal requirements. Revenue from the carbon tax was to be redistributed to the provinces. According to a report by the Canadian Chamber of Commerce (CCC) released on December 13, 2018, Canada's largest business group endorsed the carbon pricing introduced by the federal government, saying it offers flexibility and is the "most efficient way to cut emissions", as well as "solidly backs carbon pricing". According to a December 13, 2018, CTV News article, Stewart Elgie, from the Environment Institute at the University of Ottawa, the CCC's "endorsement of the carbon tax as the most efficient emissions-cutting tool" and its support of "Canada's investments in clean technology at home and abroad" provides the Canadian economy with a "major opportunity ... to market itself in a low-carbon future".

In December 2018, the Senate Committee on Agriculture and Forestry submitted a report based on a year-long study of the "impacts of climate change and carbon pricing on agriculture, agri-food and forestry". Although some witnesses raised concerns that Canada's international competitiveness could be diminished compared with producers "who do not bear these additional, carbon-related costs", the committee noted that a "study of the effects of British Columbia's carbon tax — which launched in 2008 — suggested the province's international competitiveness was not diminished". The report recommended that Environment and Climate Change Canada consider exemptions for agricultural activities under the GHGPPA, with "special attention to competitiveness for producers and food affordability for Canadians". The committee recommended exempting fuels used for heating or transportation in farming activities.

=== 2018: Canadian government enacts GHGPPA ===
The Parliament of Canada passed the Greenhouse Gas Pollution Pricing Act (GHGPPA) in fall 2018 under Bill C-74. The GHGPPA refers to a charge or pricing instead of taxation. The charge, which will rise to $50 per tonne of CO_{2} by 2022, begins at CA$20 in 2019 and increases by CA$10 per year until 2022. Under the GHGPPA, provinces have the flexibility to implement their own solutions to mitigate GHG emissions in their own jurisdictions. All provinces were required to place a minimum price of CA$20 per tonne of GHG emissions by January 1, 2019. The tax was retroactive to January 2019. The tax increased to CA$30 per tonne in 2020 and CA$40 per tonne in 2021.

The federal government sends an annual rebate ranging from $300 to 600 adequate emissions pricing plans. For example, if under the GHGPPA a family of four in Ontario pays an additional CA$20 per month for gas, home heating, and other costs, it will receive CA$307 in annual rebates. Compared to the CA$240 in costs, the GHGPPA should leave the family CA$67 better off in 2019. The rebate increases each year along with the carbon price. Taxpayers had to request the Climate Action Incentive Payment (CAIP) rebate on their annual income tax return until filing their 2021 tax return, since which eligibility for the rebate has been automatic and the taxpayer sent a cheque or had a direct deposit made into their bank account.

In her October 23, 2018 Power & Politics podcast, Vassy Kapelos interviewed Dominic LeBlanc, the Minister of Intergovernmental Affairs, Northern Affairs and Internal Trade, Saskatchewan Premier Scott Moe, and Ontario Minister of Environment Rod Phillips. Carbon pricing in Canada is forecast by Environment Canada to remove 50–60 MT of emissions from the air annually by 2022, representing about 12% of all Canadian emissions. However, Canada needs to reduce emissions to 512 MT by 2030 to meet its commitments under the Paris Agreement. This would mean reducing annual emissions by about 200 MT from 2018 levels. In addition to carbon pricing, the government is pursuing a range of additional policies, including improving fuel standards, energy efficiency, and closing coal plants.

==== Forecast economic impact ====
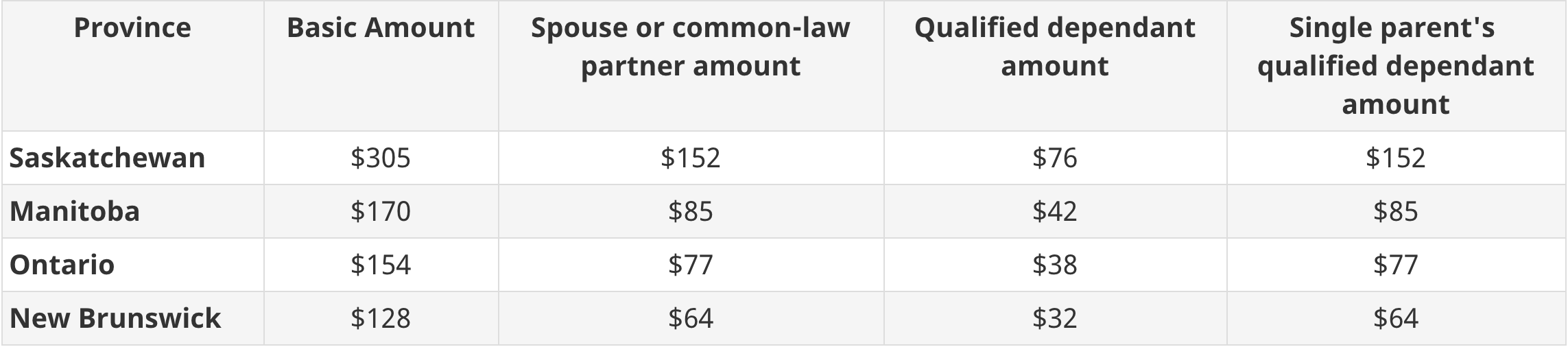
Expected Rebates for A Single Canadian in Eligible Jurisdictions

A May 22, 2018, report by the Parliamentary Budget Officer (OFC) showed that carbon pricing would have at most a minor impact on the economy, with an increase in GDP in 2022 of about CA$2 billion, or 0.1% of GDP. According to a 2018 report, British Columbia, which has had a carbon price since 2008, had the fastest-growing economy in Canada.

In its April 25, 2019 report, Canada's Parliamentary Budget Officer estimated that the federal government "will generate CA$2.63 billion in carbon pricing revenues in 2019-20." The report said that the "vast majority of revenues (CA$2.43 billion) will be generated through the fuel charge; the balance, roughly CA$197 million, will be generated by output-based pricing." According to the report, carbon pricing revenues will increase by an estimated CA$6.20 billion by 2023–24—CA$5.77 billion from the fuel charge and the rest from the OBPS, a "trading system for large industry, known as the output-based pricing system (OBPS)".

"The federal government has stated that the carbon pricing system will be revenue neutral; any revenues generated under the system will be returned to the province or territory in which they are generated. Households will receive 90 per cent of the revenues raised. The remaining 10 per cent will go to support particularly affected sectors, including small businesses, schools, and hospitals. Based on this assumption, 80% of households will receive higher transfers than the amount paid in direct and indirect costs. The net benefits are broadly progressive by income group: lower-income households will receive larger net transfers than higher-income households."

— "Fiscal and Distributional Analysis of the Federal Carbon Pricing System". Parliamentary Budget Officer (OFC). April 25, 2019. p.3.

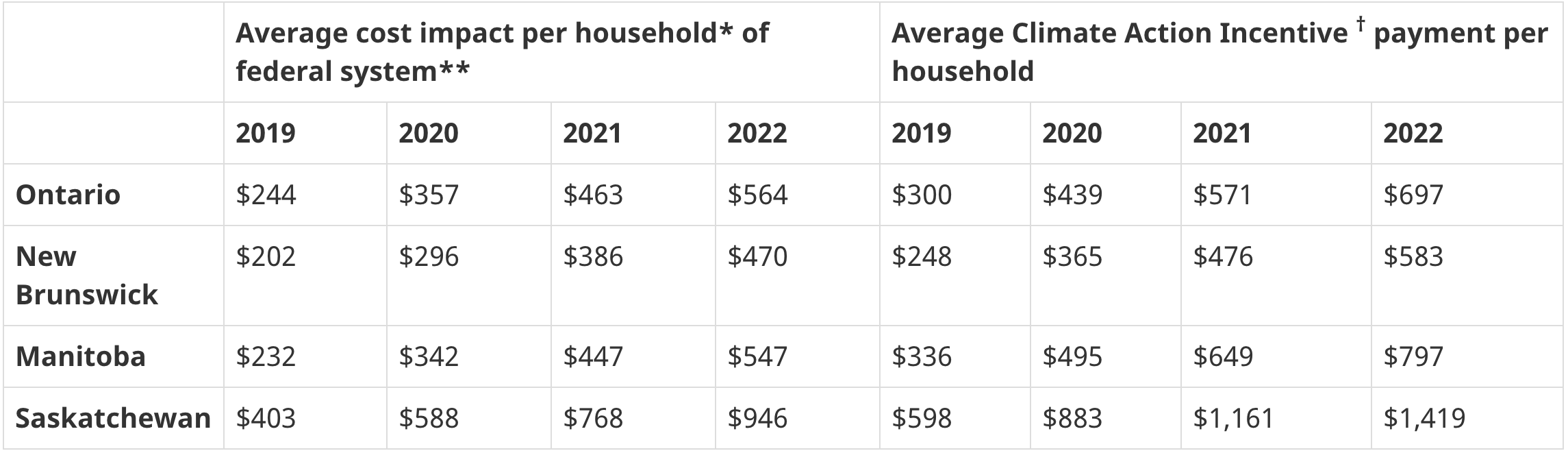
In the four provinces where the Government of Canada is returning proceeds to individuals and families through the Climate Action Incentive, most households will get more back than they pay as a result of pollution pricing.

The Canadian Revenue Agency declared that, as of June 3, 2019, the average payment to households was less than previously estimated. It amounted to CA$174 in New Brunswick, CA$203 in Ontario, CA$231 in Manitoba, and CA$422 in Saskatchewan.

=== 2018: Constitutional challenges of GHGPPA ===
In 2019, the provinces of Manitoba, Ontario, and Saskatchewan brought a case to the Supreme Court of Canada challenging the GHGPPA. On March 25, 2021, the justices rejected their appeal, ruling in Reference re Greenhouse Gas Pollution Pricing Act that the GHGPPA was constitutional.

=== 2020: Updated federal carbon price, reaching $170 in 2030 ===
In December 2020, the federal government released an updated plan with a $15 /t per year increase in the carbon price, reaching $95 /t in 2025 and $170 /t in 2030.

=== 2023: targeted relief for low-income and rural households and Ukraine deal ===
In October 2023, Prime Minister Justin Trudeau announced that the federal government was granting a carbon exemption on heating oil from 2023 through 2027 because the price of heating oil increased by 75% in 2022. Natural gas, which is used by better-off households, now costs one-half to one-quarter the cost of heating oil. Only about 3% of Canadians still use heating oil, most located in the Atlantic provinces. They are also mainly low-income and rural, so the exemption was intended for this demographic. Opposition critics said the move was politically motivated, as the Liberal government has more Members of Parliament in the Atlantic provinces. Environmentalists also criticized the decision, saying it undermines the carbon pricing scheme.

The Liberal government argued that 80% of Canadians were receiving more money back via a carbon rebate but the tax was becoming more unpopular with those facing affordability challenges, and it became an increasingly divisive political issue. In 2023, the Official Opposition refused to support a revised free trade bill between Canada and the Ukraine that added a new environmental chapter to "promote carbon pricing". Liberal Trade Minister Mary Ng stated, "We should applaud the Ukrainians for being able to negotiate an agreement and also fight climate change." Liberal House leader Karina Gould argued the Tories were "abandoning Ukraine and not taking climate change seriously", and accused them of "American-style, right-wing politics". Pierre Poilievre, the leader of the Opposition, called the carbon tax stipulation "cruel" and stated, "It is disgusting, that Trudeau’s ideological obsession with taxing working-class people, seniors and suffering families has come ahead of what should have been a free trade agreement."

=== 2024: Promises to eliminate consumer carbon tax ===
By the end of 2024, opinion polls showed the ruling Trudeau Liberals were 20 points behind the Conservative Party of Canada, which was using the slogan "Axe the Tax" in their platform. Many Liberals, worried about projected losses in the 2025 federal election, pushed for Justin Trudeau to resign, which he eventually announced on January 6, 2025. During the race to find a new leader, candidates Mark Carney and Chrystia Freeland promised to end the consumer carbon tax; candidate Karina Gould vowed to continue with the tax but promised to stop a future increase; and, candidate Frank Baylis would not commit to either ending, or, continuing with the tax, saying it was not the sole reason for the affordability crisis. The policy was also receiving increased pushback from premiers and NDP leader Jagmeet Singh, who had been supporting the Liberal government, said his party was "working on a climate plan that wouldn't put the burden on the backs of workers."

=== 2025: Removal of consumer carbon tax ===
In January 2025, Trudeau announced that he would step down as leader of the Liberal Party and as prime minister following the selection of a new leader. On March 14, 2025, Mark Carney, former governor of the Bank of Canada, was sworn in as prime minister; as promised during his leadership campaign, Carney announced that he would "immediately" remove the federal consumer carbon tax implemented via the GHGPPA, stating that the change "will make a difference to hard-pressed Canadians, but it is part of a much bigger set of measures that this government is taking to ensure that we fight against climate change, that our companies are competitive and the country moves forward." Carney signed a prime ministerial directive, later affirmed by the signing of an Order in Council, to implement the removal by setting the consumer carbon tax to 0% upon its next increment on April 1, 2025.

== Public resistance to carbon taxes ==
Implementing carbon taxes to reduce GHG emissions can face resistance from the public, but one author has suggested that the majority of the population's resistance is due to a lack of understanding how economically and environmentally beneficial a carbon tax may be.

Following the elimination of the consumer carbon tax, polling conducted in 2025 by Kolosowski Strategies found that 57% of Canadians remained opposed to increasing the industrial carbon tax, while 30% were in favour and 14% did not know.

== Carbon price in individual provinces and territories ==
By 2018, Quebec (2007), British Columbia (2008), Alberta, Ontario, Manitoba, and Nova Scotia had carbon-pricing policies in place. By 2017, Metro Vancouver was "exploring road fares and other fee-based mechanisms to address traffic congestion". Ontario cancelled its cap-and-trade system in 2018. The outlines of a new climate plan for Ontario, which did not include any carbon pricing system, were unveiled in November 2018. Manitoba, Ontario, Saskatchewan, and New Brunswick refused to impose their own emission-pricing systems, so the federal pricing came into effect on April 1. Residents of the four provinces pay more for gasoline and heating fuel. The "starting rate added 4.4 cents to the price of a litre of gas, about four cents to a cubic metre of natural gas". The price of propane, butane, and aviation fuel also increased. Residents receive rebates on their income tax returns. Amounts vary by province. In Saskatchewan, for example, a family of four was estimated to receive $609 in 2019.

=== British Columbia ===
The Government of British Columbia introduced a carbon tax in 2008, and cancelled it on March 14, 2025, after Prime Minister Mark Carney announced he was removing federal consumer carbon pricing. British Columbia was the first Canadian province to join the Western Climate Initiative (WCI), which was established in February 2007 by the governors of Arizona, California, New Mexico, Oregon, and Washington to reduce greenhouse gas emissions. The WCI became an international partnership when BC joined. By 2011, BC's preference was for its existing carbon tax as opposed to the cap and trade proposed by the WCI.

In 2013, Angel Gurría, then-Secretary-General of the Organisation for Economic Co-operation and Development (OECD), said that the "implementation of British Columbia's carbon tax is as near as we have to a textbook case, with wide coverage across sectors and a steady increase in the rate" over a period of five years. According to a November 2015 article in The Atlantic, after British Columbia's provincial government introduced a carbon tax in 2008, greenhouse emissions were reduced, "fossil fuel use in British Columbia [had fallen] by 16 percent, as compared to a 3 percent increase in the rest of Canada, and its economy ... outperformed the rest of the country." This illustrated that the carbon tax benefits were "no longer theoretical" and did not hinder economic growth. In 2022, Pretis published an analysis of the carbon tax program in British Columbia showing that there was an especially large decline in emissions in the transportation sector. However, statistically, the reduction in aggregate emissions has not been as significant.

=== Quebec ===
Quebec participates in an international emissions trading scheme with the US state of California. In June 2007, Quebec implemented a carbon tax on energy distributors, producers, and refiners, the first Canadian province to do so. In 2013, it replaced the carbon tax with a cap-and-trade scheme on carbon emissions. The system got linked with the Californian carbon market in 2014, making it the largest such system in North America. It has generated over 11.8 billion Canadian dollars in profit, which are reinvested in the province through the Electrification and Climate Change Fund. In June 2026 it was announced that the carbon market would be further linked in 2027 with the cap-and-invest scheme of the US state of Washington.

=== Saskatchewan ===
The Premier of Saskatchewan, Scott Moe, has spoken emphatically against the GHGPPA. The Government of Saskatchewan released a report entitled "Prairie Resilience: A Made-in-Saskatchewan Climate Change Strategy", which Moe said in an October 23, 2018, interview with CBC's Vassy Kapelos had been accepted by the federal government as meeting GHGPPA requirements. The federal government assured Saskatchewan residents that "all direct proceeds collected in Saskatchewan under the federal pollution pricing backstop system" would be repaid "through direct payments to individuals and families and investments to reduce emissions, save money, and create jobs". For example, a family of four would "receive $609 in 2019".

=== Alberta ===
In July 2007, Alberta enacted the Specified Gas Emitters Regulation, Alta. Reg. 139/2007, (SGER). This tax exacts a $15 per tonne contribution by companies that emit more than 100,000 tonnes of greenhouse gas annually that do not reduce their CO_{2} emissions per barrel by 12 percent or buy an offset. In January 2016, the contribution required by large emitters increased to $20 per tonne. The tax fell heavily on oil companies and coal-fired electricity plants. It was intended to encourage companies to lower emissions while fostering new technology. The plan only covered the largest emitters, which produced 70% of Alberta's emissions. Critics charged that the smallest energy producers are often the most casual about emissions and pollution. The carbon tax is currently $20 per tonne. Because Alberta's economy is dependent on oil extraction, most Albertans opposed a nationwide carbon tax. Alberta also opposed a national cap-and-trade system. The local tax retains the proceeds within Alberta. On November 23, 2015, the Alberta government announced a carbon tax scheme similar to British Columbia's in that it would apply to the entire economy. All businesses and residents paid tax based on equivalent emissions, including the burning of wood and biofuels. The tax came into force in 2017 at $20 per tonne. In November 2015, Premier Rachel Notley and Alberta Environment Minister Shannon Phillips announced Alberta's carbon tax.

In a 2015 Maclean's article, economist Trevor Tombe wrote that "[p]ricing carbon is one of the most sensible policy prescriptions to address greenhouse gas emissions". Tombe listed the advantages and disadvantages. The carbon tax provides a "new source of revenue for the government". The tax is a "far more efficient means of lowering greenhouse gas emissions than regulatory approaches." As part of the process of researching and implementing the carbon tax, the Alberta government worked with a panel chaired by University of Alberta economist Andrew Leach to study a carbon tax based on "sensible, evidence-based policy advice", which Tombe described as "a model for other jurisdictions". The price of the carbon tax began at CA$20 a tonne in 2017, rose to CA$30 a ton in 2018, and was tied to a 2% increase based on inflation, which Tombe considered "reasonable". Tombe estimated the impact of the carbon tax on the three "most carbon-intensive consumer purchases". He estimated an increase in the price of gasoline of 6.7 cents per litre when the CA$30 a tonne tax came into effect. Natural gas prices would increase by about $1.50 /GJ. "[L]ow to middle-income households" would "receive compensation".

Premier Kenney joined like-minded premiers, including Doug Ford of Ontario, Scott Moe of Saskatchewan, and Brian Pallister of Manitoba, in a lawsuit against the federal Liberal government on the carbon tax. The Court of Appeal of Alberta ruled against the federal government. This decision was later overturned when the Supreme Court of Canada ruled that the federal carbon tax was constitutional. In 2019, the first piece of legislation introduced by the newly elected Premier of Alberta, Jason Kenney, was Bill 1, An Act to Repeal the Carbon Tax. On June 4, 2019, the bill was enacted. It repeals the provincial carbon tax, but it will be replaced by the federal carbon levy. On March 14, 2025, after new Liberal Prime Minister Mark Carney eliminated consumer carbon pricing and rebates, which he had defended in the past, Premier Danielle Smith said she worried Carney would increase industrial carbon taxes as he had previously stated they were not high enough.

=== Ontario ===
The Ontario Climate Change Mitigation and Low-Carbon Economy Act, 2016, passed by the government of Kathleen Wynne, established a standard cap-and-trade system that integrates with the Western Climate Initiative (WCI), providing access to an "even greater market to buy and sell the most cost effective carbon credits". Gary Goodwin called it the "best and most integrated solution to the problem of emissions".

In September 2017, the Wynne government joined the Western Climate Initiative (WCI), established in February 2007 by the governors of Arizona, California, New Mexico, Oregon, and Washington to reduce greenhouse gas emissions. *April 24, 2007: British Columbia joined with the five western states, turning the WCI into an international partnership with the goal of developing a multi-sector, market-based program to reduce greenhouse gas emissions.and link its cap-and-trade system with Quebec's and California's in January 2018. This harmonized carbon market will be the second largest in the world, trailing only the EU Emissions Trading System (ETS) and will feature joint permit auctions. Because it allows for permit trading between jurisdictions, linked cap-and-trade systems achieve lower-cost mitigation actions across jurisdictions than an unlinked system.

In October 2018, the newly elected Progressive Conservative government under premier Doug Ford cancelled the previous cap-and-trade system, as he had promised in his electoral campaign. In November, the Ontario government unveiled a climate plan that did "not include any kind of price on emissions".

==== Gas station decals ====
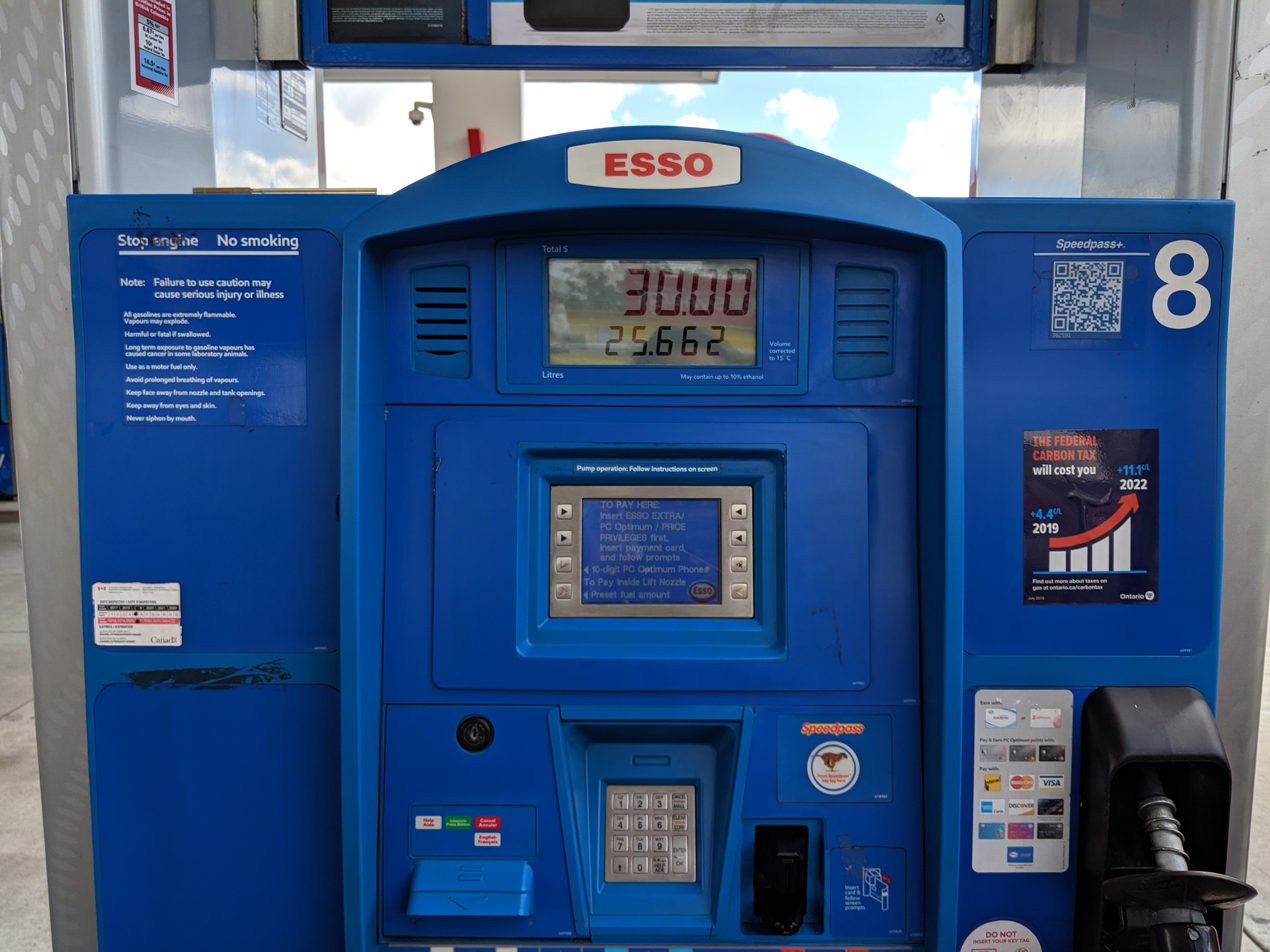
An Esso gas pump displaying a decal discussing the effects of the federal carbon tax on gas prices to comply with the Federal Carbon Tax Transparency Act

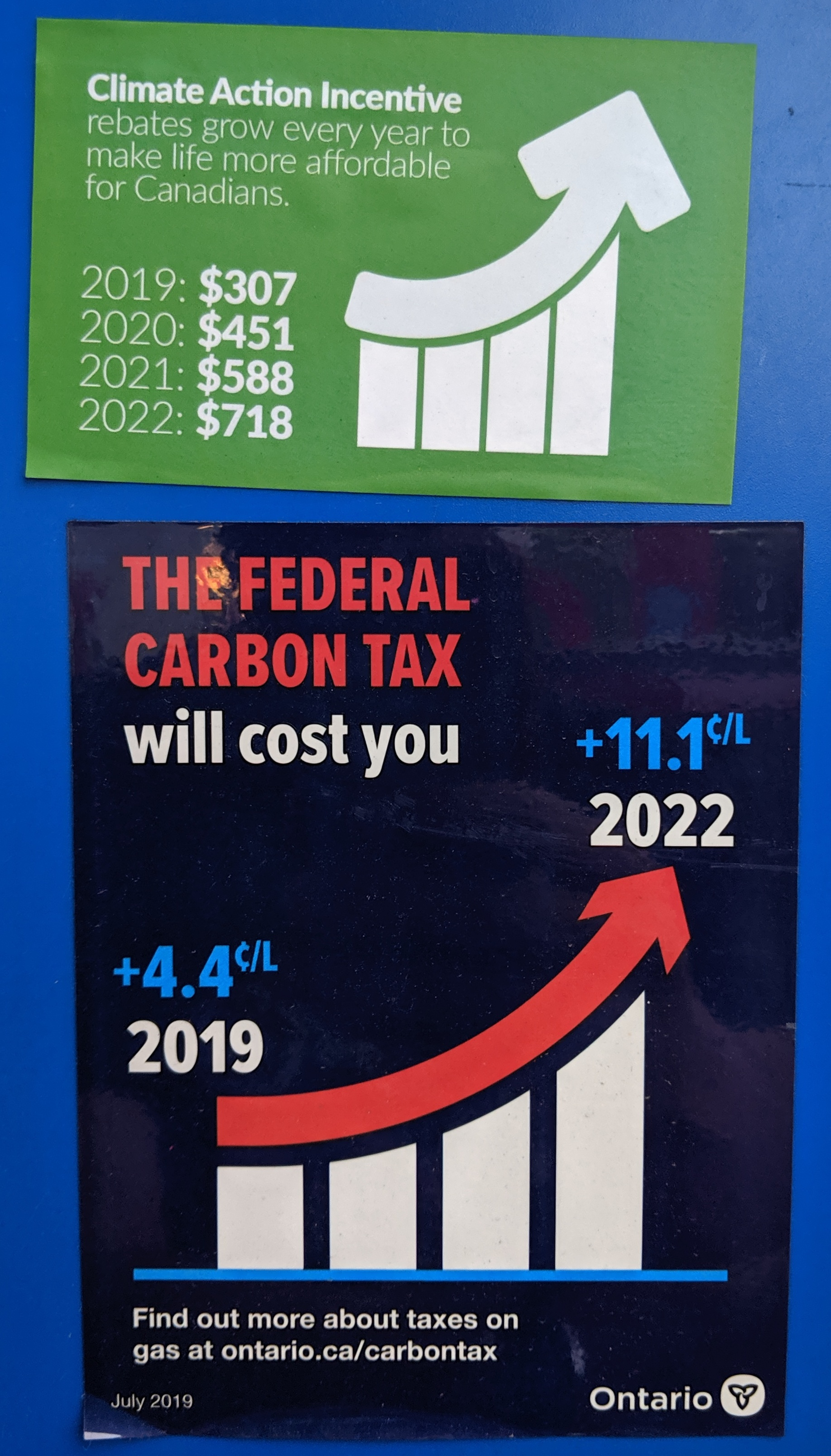
Carbon tax sticker with a counter Climate Action Incentive sticker above it

In April 2019, the provincial government introduced the Federal Carbon Tax Transparency Act as part of its budget, which makes it mandatory for all gas stations (excluding those situated on Indian reserves) to display government-commissioned decals on their pumps informing customers of the claimed "cost" of the carbon tax—increasing gas prices by 4.4 cents per litre and up to 11 cents per litre by 2022. The decals include the URL of a page on the Ontario government's website that explains its position on the tax, but they do not mention the rebate program. Gas stations may be inspected at "all reasonable times" for compliance with the act, and owners may be fined CA$500 for their first violation and CA$1,000 per day if they persist. The fines increase to $5,000 and 10,000 for corporations. The act became effective on August 30, 2019.

Federal Minister of Environment and Climate Change Catherine McKenna accused the Ford government of "wasting taxpayers' dollars on misleading stickers" that failed to acknowledge the rebate programs "or the cost of inaction on climate change". The act was criticized by the Ontario NDP, with MPP Peter Tabuns accusing Ford of "threatening private business owners with massive fines for failing to post Conservative Party advertisement[s]". Fellow MPP Taras Natyshak issued a letter to the Chief Electoral Officer alleging that the decals should be considered partisan campaign advertising under the Canada Elections Act due to the then-upcoming federal election. The government defended the decals and act, considering it "transparency" that reminds Ontario residents of the "costs" of the Liberal carbon tax. Green Party of Ontario leader Mike Schreiner accused Ford of "forcing businesses to be complicit in his anti-climate misinformation campaign" and invited gas stations to help him inform the public that "climate change will cost us more" with his own version of the decal.

The Canadian Civil Liberties Association took the Ontario government to court over the mandatory stickers, arguing the messages were "a form of compelled political expression". In September 2020, the Ontario Superior Court of Justice sided with the CCLA, ruling that Ford's mandatory gas-pump decals attacking federal carbon-pricing measures were unconstitutional and violated business owners' freedom of expression.

=== Northwest Territories ===
The Government of the Northwest Territories implemented a carbon price that took effect in September 2019.

== Output Based Pricing System (OBPS) ==
Most aspects of the federal government's Output Based Pricing System (OBPS) announced in December 2018, "which targets greenhouse gas emissions from large, industrial facilities", are similar to Alberta's Carbon Competitiveness Incentive Regulation (CCIR), which was also similar to Alberta's 2007 Specified Gas Emitters Regulation (SGER). The three programs had a "price on carbon emissions" and a "system of allocations through which firms receive some number of emissions credits for free." The OBPS rules apply to large facilities in Ontario, New Brunswick, Manitoba, Prince Edward Island, Saskatchewan, Yukon, and Nunavut, the "provinces covered by the federal backstop policy." The OBPS covers a "relatively small share of emissions in the provinces it affects." Most emissions come from smaller emitters, which "will be covered in large part by the carbon price". A University of Alberta professor of economics, Andrew Leach, blogged that "Much of the coverage of this system has framed the OBPS as an exemption from emissions pricing for large emitters, but that hides the importance of the two, linked programs – the carbon price and the output-based allocation of credits."

In spring 2018, the federal government "proposed that all fossil fuel-burning generating stations be treated the same with the first 420 tonnes of greenhouse gases per gigawatt hour of electricity produced exempt from carbon taxes and everything above that subject to a charge." CBC reported in October 2018 that "natural gas stations face carbon taxes on emissions above 370 tonnes, oil on emissions above 550 tonnes and coal above 800 tonnes, a major concession to coal plants." (Note: According to Robert Jones' CBC article, by 2016, the Irving Oil Refinery in Saint John, New Brunswick was the largest source of greenhouse gases in Atlantic Canada. Belledune Generating Station a 450 MW coal-fired electrical generating station owned and operated by provincial Crown corporation NB Power in Belledune, New Brunswick, was the second largest source.)

== Carbon tax and the 2019 federal election ==
In June 2018, John Ivison wrote in the National Post that the Conservative Party was attempting to make the carbon tax "the single issue" of the 2019 federal election campaign. He argued that Andrew Scheer's leadership had interpreted Doug Ford's election as premier of Ontario as "an explicit rejection of the carbon tax".

== Carbon tax debate ==
The federal carbon pricing system in Canada has been the subject of significant debate and controversy. Since 2016, the Mining Association of Canada has supported carbon pricing as a way of responding to climate change. A 2024 Ecological Economics journal literature review based on public communications on carbon pricing of the 100 largest oil and gas companies said that 54% of those oil and gas companies with a stated policy on carbon taxes express support for such measures, rising to 78% among the top 50 companies.

The debate on carbon pricing intensified in early February 2023, with a polar vortex causing record-breaking cold weather. Pierre Poilievre, the leader of the Conservative Party of Canada and the leader of the Official Opposition since 2022, blamed the dramatic increase in heating bills on the carbon price, commonly referred to as the "carbon tax", on his social media accounts, which reached half a million views. In June 2023, Poilievre launched his "Axe the Tax" campaign in the Atlantic provinces, just days before the region faced increased gas prices when carbon pricing came into force in that region on July 1, 2023, following a four-year exemption.

Poilievre pledged in July 2023 that he would repeal the carbon tax if the Conservatives form government under him in the 2025 federal election. In March 2024, Poilievre called for a non-confidence vote in the federal government in the House of Commons to prevent the April 1 increase in the carbon price. Prior to the April 1 carbon tax increase, Poilievre crossed the country holding "Axe the Tax" rallies. With the backing of both the Bloc Québécois and the NDP, the government survived. A group called Nationwide Protest Against Carbon Tax organized protests at about fifteen locations across Canada, with dozens of participants at some locations. Its goal was to slow traffic on major highways and at borders to protest the increase of the federal consumer carbon price to $15 per tonne. As of April 2, 2024, two hundred economists had signed an open letter refuting Poilievre's stance on carbon pricing.

== Impact of a carbon tax on inequality ==
In 2019, Fremstad published an article discussing the distributional effects of a carbon tax policy, showing that a carbon tax that does not return revenue to taxpayers is naturally regressive and negatively impacts low-income households, affecting those with the lowest income the most. However, returning the revenue that comes from the carbon tax to taxpayers, as is done in Canada, reduces negative effects on low-income households, ultimately leading to a significant decrease in CO_{2} emissions while also benefiting low-income households.

=== Acts and Regulations for carbon pricing ===
Legislation	Program	Act and regulation links
Alberta	Technology Innovation and Emissions Reduction Regulation	Emissions Management and Climate Resilience Act; Technology Innovation and Emissions Reduction Regulation (TIER); Standard for validation, verification and audit
British Columbia	British Columbia's Carbon Tax	Carbon Tax Act; Carbon Tax Regulation; Reporting Industrial Greenhouse Gas Emissions
Canada	How carbon pricing works	Act; Regulation (OBPS)
New Brunswick		Climate Change Act
Newfoundland and Labrador	Carbon Tax	Management of Greenhouse Gas Act; Management of Greenhouse Gas Reporting Regulations
Nova Scotia	Nova Scotia's Cap-and-Trade Program	Environment Act (Amendments to create the cap-and-trade program); Cap-and-Trade Program Regulations; Quantification, Reporting and Verification Regulations
Ontario	Report greenhouse gas (GHG) emissions; Emissions Performance Standards program	Environmental Protection Act; Emissions Performance Standards program; Regulations: Greenhouse Gas Emissions: Quantification, Reporting and Verification Regulation; Greenhouse Gas Emissions Performance Standards
Prince Edward Island	Carbon Levy	Climate Leadership Act; Climate Leadership Regulations
Quebec	The Carbon Market	Environment Quality Act; Regulations: Cap & Trade; Reporting
Saskatchewan	Climate Change Strategy	Legislation and Regulations; The Management and Reduction of Greenhouse Gases (Baselines, Returns and Verification) Standard

== See also ==
- Climate change in Canada
