= Reference Re Securities Act =

2011 Supreme Court of Canada case

- Supreme Court of Canada

Hearing: April 13–14, 2011 Judgment: December 22, 2011
- Full case name: In the Matter of a Reference by the Governor in Council concerning the proposed Canadian Securities Act, as set out in Order in Council P.C. 2010-667, dated May 26, 2010
- Citations: 2011 SCC 66 (LexUM), (CanLII)
- Docket No.: 33718

Holding
- Bill as proposed is not restricted to matters of genuine national concern, and is therefore unconstitutional.

Court membership
- Chief Justice: Beverley McLachlin; Puisne Justices: Ian Binnie, Louis LeBel, Marie Deschamps, Morris Fish, Rosalie Abella, Louise Charron, Marshall Rothstein, Thomas Cromwell

Reasons given
- Unanimous reasons by: The Court

Reference Re Securities Act [2011] 3 S.C.R. 837, 2011 SCC 66 is a landmark opinion of the Supreme Court of Canada to a reference question posed on the extent of the ability of the Parliament of Canada to use its trade and commerce power.

== Background ==
Canadian securities regulation is unique in that the field is solely regulated by provincial and territorial governments. While those governments have worked to harmonize many of their policies, there is still enough variation that securities issuers must reconcile in order to have their securities trade among residents in each of the jurisdictions involved.

Since the 1930s, there has been debate about the desirability of establishing a single national securities regulator. In 2010, a draft Canadian Securities Act was published, and a reference question was posed to the Supreme Court of Canada on its constitutionality.

=== Provincial references ===
The provincial governments of Alberta and Quebec had previously posed reference questions to their respective Courts of Appeal on the subject. In March 2011, the Alberta Court of Appeal ruled unanimously that the federal proposal in its entirety was an unconstitutional intrusion into provincial jurisdiction.

In the same month, the Quebec Court of Appeal made a similar ruling in a 4-1 split decision, but stated that sections 148-152 and 158-168 of the proposed Act (dealing with orders for the production of information, criminal offences, prohibition orders and restitution orders) were valid under the criminal law power, and that there was no question that the Act would be constitutional if it focused solely on international and interprovincial regulation of securities transactions. The Alberta Court had considered the criminal law provisions to be so incidental to the purpose of the Act that they could not stand on their own, and it did not discuss in detail the international and interprovincial questions.

=== Question posed ===
Is the proposed Canadian Securities Act within the legislative authority of the Parliament of Canada?

== Arguments offered at the hearing ==
At issue was the question of whether the regulation of the securities industry is a valid exercise of the federal trade and commerce power. In that regard, arguments focused on the applicability of the five criteria for such an analysis that were previously identified in General Motors of Canada Ltd. v. City National Leasing:

- the impugned legislation must be part of a regulatory scheme;
- the scheme must be monitored by the continuing oversight of a regulatory agency;
- the legislation must be concerned with trade as a whole rather than with a particular industry;
- the legislation should be of a nature that provinces jointly or severally would be constitutionally incapable of enacting; and
- the failure to include one or more provinces or localities in a legislative scheme would jeopardize the successful operation of the scheme in other parts of the country.

If the trade and commerce power does not apply, then securities regulation, being in pith and substance under the property and civil rights power, falls exclusively within provincial jurisdiction, as the double aspect and paramountcy doctrines would not come into play.

Both sides agreed that the first two General Motors criteria were met, and subsequent arguments revolved around the other three. Numerous submissions were presented to the Court on this question.

There was general agreement among observers that the resulting decision will affect Canadian federalism beyond the immediate question of securities regulation.

=== Trade as a whole ===
Canada argued that securities law transcends all industries, and thus should be a valid exercise of the trade and commerce power, in the same way as for competition law. On the other side, it was argued that the securities industry should be viewed in the same manner as the insurance industry, which since Citizen's Insurance Co. v. Parsons has been held to fall under provincial jurisdiction.

=== Ability of the provinces to regulate jointly or severally ===
Canada noted that, while the provincial securities regulators efforts to operate a passport system have met with some success, there are still some significant constitutional limitations on their ability to regulate the securities industry in the modern age:

- the provinces cannot apply their regulations extra-provincially;
- the securities industry has become primarily international in scope;
- provinces cannot regulate federally incorporated companies; and
- provinces lack the ability to include criminal sanctions with their regulations

Alberta, among others, argued that there were no flaws in the present passport system that could not be fixed, and that the proposed Act contained nothing that could not be found in current provincial legislation.

=== Jeopardizing the successful operation of the scheme ===
As the proposed Act contains an opt-in clause (providing that it would only apply in provinces that choose to participate), it was argued that this shows that unanimous provincial involvement is not necessary and that therefore this should be considered an area that the provinces are more than capable of regulating without the involvement of the Federal Government. Canada responded that this represented an example of the current model of cooperative federalism that had already been employed in agricultural products marketing, and which was approved by the Court in Reference re Agricultural Products Marketing Act.

== Opinion of the Supreme Court of Canada ==
The Court held that, as presently drafted, the proposed Act is not valid under the general branch of the federal power to regulate trade and commerce. It is mainly focused on the day‑to‑day regulation of all aspects of contracts for securities within the provinces, including all aspects of public protection and professional competences. These matters remain essentially provincial concerns falling within property and civil rights in the provinces and are not related to trade as a whole.

[122] ... Canada’s problem is that the proposed Act reflects an attempt that goes well beyond these matters of undoubted national interest and concern and reaches down into the detailed regulation of all aspects of securities. In this respect, the proposed Act is unlike federal competition legislation, which has been held to fall under s. 91(2) of the Constitution Act, 1867. It would regulate all aspects of contracts for securities within the provinces, including all aspects of public protection and professional competence within the provinces. Competition law, by contrast, regulates only anti-competitive contracts and conduct — a particular aspect of economic activity that falls squarely within the federal domain. In short, the proposed federal Act overreaches the legislative interest of the federal government.

Specific aspects of the Act aimed at addressing matters of genuine national importance and scope going to trade as a whole in a way that is distinct from provincial concerns, including management of systemic risk and national data collection, appear to be related to the general trade and commerce power. With respect to these aspects of the Act, the provinces, acting alone or in concert, lack the constitutional capacity to sustain a viable national scheme.

[103] Systemic risks have been defined as “risks that occasion a ‘domino effect’ whereby the risk of default by one market participant will impact the ability of others to fulfill their legal obligations, setting off a chain of negative economic consequences that pervade an entire financial system” (M. J. Trebilcock, National Securities Regulator Report (2010), at para. 26). By definition, such risks can be evasive of provincial boundaries and usual methods of control. The proposed legislation is aimed in part at responding to systemic risks threatening the Canadian market viewed as a whole. Without attempting an exhaustive enumeration, the following provisions of the proposed Act would appear to address or authorize the adoption of regulations directed at systemic risk: ss. 89 and 90 relating to derivatives, s. 126(1) on short-selling, s. 73 on credit rating, s. 228(4)(c) relating to urgent regulations and ss. 109 and 224 on data collection and sharing.

In sum, the proposed Act overreaches genuine national concerns. While the economic importance and pervasive character of the securities market may, in principle, support federal intervention that is qualitatively different from what the provinces can do, they do not justify a wholesale takeover of the regulation of the securities industry which is the ultimate consequence of the proposed federal legislation. A cooperative approach that permits a scheme recognizing the essentially provincial nature of securities regulation while allowing Parliament to deal with genuinely national concerns remains available and is supported by Canadian constitutional principles and by the practice adopted by the federal and provincial governments in other fields of activities.

[128] To summarize, we accept that the economic importance and pervasive character of the securities market may, in principle, support federal intervention that is qualitatively different from what the provinces can do. However, as important as the preservation of capital markets and the maintenance of Canada’s financial stability are, they do not justify a wholesale takeover of the regulation of the securities industry which is the ultimate consequence of the proposed federal legislation. The need to prevent and respond to systemic risk may support federal legislation pertaining to the national problem raised by this phenomenon, but it does not alter the basic nature of securities regulation which, as shown, remains primarily focused on local concerns of protecting investors and ensuring the fairness of the markets through regulation of participants. Viewing the Act as a whole, as we must, these local concerns remain the main thrust of the legislation — its pith and substance.

[129] This is not a case of a valid federal scheme that incidentally intrudes on provincial powers. It is not the incidental effects of the scheme that are constitutionally suspect; it is rather the main thrust of the legislation that goes beyond the federal power. The federal government properly did not invoke the ancillary powers doctrine. To apply that doctrine, the proposed statute considered as a whole must be valid — which it is not. We further note that we have not been asked for our opinion on the extent of Parliament’s legislative authority over securities regulation under other heads of federal power or indeed the interprovincial or international trade branch of s. 91(2).

[130] While the proposed Act must be found ultra vires Parliament's general trade and commerce power, a cooperative approach that permits a scheme that recognizes the essentially provincial nature of securities regulation while allowing Parliament to deal with genuinely national concerns remains available.

[131] The various proposals advanced over the years to develop a new model for regulating securities in Canada suggest that this matter possesses both central and local aspects. The same insight can be gleaned from the experience of other federations, even if each country has its own constitutional history and imperatives. The common ground that emerges is that each level of government has jurisdiction over some aspects of the regulation of securities and each can work in collaboration with the other to carry out its responsibilities.

[132] It is not for the Court to suggest to the governments of Canada and the provinces the way forward by, in effect, conferring in advance an opinion on the constitutionality on this or that alternative scheme. Yet we may appropriately note the growing practice of resolving the complex governance problems that arise in federations, not by the bare logic of either/or, but by seeking cooperative solutions that meet the needs of the country as a whole as well as its constituent parts.

[133] Such an approach is supported by the Canadian constitutional principles and by the practice adopted by the federal and provincial governments in other fields of activities. The backbone of these schemes is the respect that each level of government has for each other’s own sphere of jurisdiction. Cooperation is the animating force. The federalism principle upon which Canada’s constitutional framework rests demands nothing less.

Addressing the nature of this question within the context of Canadian federalism, the Court noted:

[7] It is a fundamental principle of federalism that both federal and provincial powers must be respected, and one power may not be used in a manner that effectively eviscerates another. Rather, federalism demands that a balance be struck, a balance that allows both the federal Parliament and the provincial legislatures to act effectively in their respective spheres. Accepting Canada’s interpretation of the general trade and commerce power would disrupt rather than maintain that balance. Parliament cannot regulate the whole of the securities system simply because aspects of it have a national dimension.

[8] We therefore answer the reference question in the negative.

[9] It is open to the federal government and the provinces to exercise their respective powers over securities harmoniously, in the spirit of cooperative federalism. The experience of other federations in the field of securities regulation, while a function of their own constitutional requirements, suggests that a cooperative approach might usefully be explored, should our legislators so choose, to ensure that each level of government properly discharges its responsibility to the public in a coordinated fashion.

[10] At this juncture, it is important to stress that this advisory opinion does not address the question of what constitutes the optimal model for regulating the securities market. While the parties presented evidence and arguments on the relative merits of federal and provincial regulation of securities, the policy question of whether a single national securities scheme is preferable to multiple provincial regimes is not one for the courts to decide. Accordingly, our answer to the reference question is dictated solely by the text of the Constitution, fundamental constitutional principles and the relevant case law.

== Significance ==
The immediate effect of the decision:

- The real question at hand was about the nature of Canadian federalism in dealing with a matter that does not fall squarely within either federal or provincial jurisdiction.
- The trade and commerce power, as originally conceived in Parsons and clarified in General Motors, is still good constitutional law that does not need to be revisited.
- The property and civil rights power is adequate for dealing with the day-to-day aspects of securities regulation, as they do not possess a national dimension.
- Certain aspects of the proposed Act would be valid, but only those with a national dimension, international and interprovincial elements, or that are related to the criminal law power.

The Federal Government has confirmed that it will not proceed with the proposed Act. There is currently extensive discussion as to the best manner for any reform to proceed.

Certain observers agree that a national regulatory authority with a more focused brief is still possible under other heads of federal power, as is the option of instituting a cooperative framework with the provinces. There is debate as to the likelihood of the provinces' cooperation. In January 2012, Minister of Finance Jim Flaherty stated that work is still continuing with the provinces to create a national regulator that would function within the bounds that the Court declared was within federal jurisdiction.

There is also concern that, viewed on the general principles of the opinion with respect to the boundary between federal jurisdiction and the provincial property and civil rights power, the following recently enacted federal statutes may also be on constitutionally shaky ground:

- Personal Information Protection and Electronic Documents Act, and
- Fighting Internet and Wireless Spam Act, as well as
- amendments adopted in 2012 to insert digital rights management provisions into the Copyright Act

== See also ==
- List of Supreme Court of Canada cases (McLachlin Court)
