= Greenhouse Gas Pollution Pricing Act =

Canadian law

House of Commons of Canada
- Long title: An Act to mitigate climate change through the pan-Canadian application of pricing mechanisms to a broad set of greenhouse gas emission sources and to make consequential amendments to other Acts
- Citation: S.C. 2018, c. 12, s. 186
- Territorial extent: Canada
- Enacted by: House of Commons of Canada
- Enacted by: Senate of Canada
- Assented to: June 21, 2018
- Commenced: June 21, 2018

Legislative history

Initiating chamber: House of Commons of Canada
- Bill title: Bill C-74 (Part 5), 42nd Parliament, 1st Session
- Introduced by: Bill Morneau, Minister of Finance
- First reading: March 27, 2018
- Second reading: April 23, 2018
- Third reading: June 6, 2018
- Committee report: May 28, 2018

Revising chamber: Senate of Canada
- Bill title: Bill C-74 (Part 5)
- First reading: June 7, 2018
- Second reading: June 11, 2018
- Third reading: June 14, 2018
- Committee report: June 14, 2018

Keywords
- Carbon pricing, climate change
- Status: Current legislation

The Greenhouse Gas Pollution Pricing Act (Note: Full title: An Act to mitigate climate change through the pan-Canadian application of pricing mechanisms to a broad set of greenhouse gas emission sources and to make consequential amendments to other Acts) (French: Loi sur la tarification de la pollution causée par les gaz à effet de serre) is a Canadian federal law establishing a set of minimum national standards for carbon pricing in Canada to meet emission reduction targets under the Paris Agreement. It was passed as Part 5 of the Budget Implementation Act, 2018, No. 1 – an omnibus budget bill – during the 42nd Parliament of Canada. The law came into force immediately upon receiving royal assent on June 21, 2018.

On March 25, 2021, the Supreme Court of Canada rejected the 2019 appeal of the provinces of Alberta, Ontario, and Saskatchewan and ruled in Reference re Greenhouse Gas Pollution Pricing Act that the GHGPPA was constitutional. Commentators had varying reactions to who the ruling benefited most politically, with some stating that it represented a blow to the group of conservative premiers that made opposition to carbon pricing a central aspect of their policies.

== Provisions ==
The legislation aims to put a price on all greenhouse gases that play a significant role in trapping heat in the atmosphere through binding "minimum national standards" on the federal government and all of the provinces and territories of Canada. The standards on pricing are divided into two parts: a regulatory charge on carbon-based fuels and an output-based emissions trading system for polluting industries.

The GHGPPA requires that all provincial and territorial governments establish a pollution pricing scheme that meets the national minimum price per tonne of carbon dioxide equivalent and established emission caps under the act. A federally-managed backstop system under GHGPPA applies in provinces or territories that do not have a system that meets the criteria or if the province or territory request the federal system be used. As of June 2019, five provinces and two territories are under the federal pricing system for one or both aspects of pollution pricing. The provinces of Ontario, Manitoba, New Brunswick, and Saskatchewan are under both the federal fuel charge and industrial emissions trading system; the territories of Yukon and Nunavut are voluntarily under both systems; and Prince Edward Island is voluntarily under the federal pricing system for industrial emissions trading only. Following the repeal of Alberta's provincial fuel levy on May 30, 2019, the federal fuel charge system will be applied to Alberta beginning January 1, 2020.

All funds collected under the federal system are returned to the province or territory where they are collected. In cases where the provincial or territorial government requested to be part of the federal system, such as Yukon (fuel charge and emissions trading) or Prince Edward Island (emissions trading only), the funds are remitted to the government of that province or territory. Residents of provinces and territories that are under the federal system due to not implementing a pollution pricing system, such as Ontario and New Brunswick, receive their share of the collected charges directly as a tax-free Climate Action Incentive Payment paid out four times per year (until 2022 the CAI was a refundable tax credit on the federal income tax for residents of these provinces instead). Approximately ten percent of the money collected from these "backstop provinces" is separately distributed by the federal government for environmental initiatives in those provinces, such as green retrofits of public schools.

== Constitutional challenges ==
The provisions of the GHGPPA were opposed by the governments of Saskatchewan and Ontario, and challenged in provincial courts. They were joined in their legal challenges by several others. For example, under Premier Blaine Higgs, the New Brunswick Attorney General submitted his intention to intervene in Saskatchewan's court challenge of the federal government's carbon pricing plan. (Note: In November 2018, the Attorney General of New Brunswick submitted his intention to "intervene in the Matter of the Greenhouse Gas Pollution Pricing Act, Bill C-74, Part V, and in the Matter of a Reference by the Lieutenant Governor in Council to the Court of Appeal under The Constitutional Questions act, 2012.")

=== Saskatchewan ===
On May 3, 2019, the Court of Appeal for Saskatchewan ruled in favour of the federal government in a 155-page 3–2 split decision that concluded that, "The Greenhouse Gas Pollution Pricing Act is not unconstitutional either in whole or in part." The federal government argued successfully that the Act was a legitimate exercise of Parliament’s "Peace, Order, and good Government" (POGG) power. Moe said he would bring the case before the Supreme Court of Canada.

On May 31, 2019, Premier Scott Moe filed his appeal of the Saskatchewan decision to the Supreme Court of Canada. He hopes the case will be heard in the fall of 2019.

=== Ontario ===
Following the election of a Progressive Conservative Party government under Doug Ford in the 2018 Ontario general election, Ontario cancelled its participation in the Western Climate Initiative cap-and-trade system. For this reason, the province was deemed non-compliant with the minimum national standards set by the GHGPPA and both backstop federal pricing systems were implemented for Ontario on April 1, 2019.

Ontario's Environment Minister Rod Phillips and Attorney General Caroline Mulroney announced a $30 million plan on August 2, 2018, to challenge the constitutionality of the GHGPPA in the Court of Appeal for Ontario. The court challenge was opposed by all three of the province's opposition parties. Eighteen parties were granted intervenor status. Intervenors supporting the Ontario government's challenge included the conservative Canadian Taxpayers Federation and Alberta's United Conservative Party (at the time forming Alberta's Official Opposition), while the Assembly of First Nations and environmentalist groups like the David Suzuki Foundation were among the intervenors supporting the GHGPPA's constitutionality.

The Court of Appeal for Ontario ruled by a four to one margin on June 28, 2019, that the Greenhouse Gas Pollution Pricing Act was constitutional. Specifically, writing for the majority, Chief Justice George Strathy ruled that the law was within federal jurisdiction "to legislate in relation to matters of 'national concern' under the 'Peace, Order, and good Government' [sic] clause of s. 91 of the Constitution Act, 1867."

Justice Grant Huscroft wrote in his dissenting opinion that the decision of the majority could have repercussions to the existing division of powers between the provinces and the federal government. He noted: "federalism is no constitutional nicety; it is a defining feature of the Canadian constitutional order that governs the way in which even the most serious problems must be addressed" and "in effect, [the federal government] has asked the court to sanction a change to the constitutional order – to increase Parliament's lawmaking authority while diminishing that of the provincial legislatures, and to do so on a permanent basis." Huscroft's dissent was described as "traditionalist" in its view of the division of powers and compared to Gérard La Forest, a former puis-ne on the Supreme Court of Canada, by former Attorney-General Peter MacKay.

The Ontario government filed an appeal of the decision with the Supreme Court of Canada on August 28, 2019.

=== Supreme Court of Canada ===
On March 25, 2021, the Supreme Court of Canada ruled that the Greenhouse Gas Pollution Pricing Act is constitutional.

== Subsequent history ==
On March 14, 2025, Trudeau's successor as prime minister, Mark Carney, removed the consumer carbon tax (CCT) implemented via the Act through a prime ministerial directive that was affirmed by an order-in-council signed by the Governor General. The power to set the carbon tax is explained in the analysis sections of Canada Gazette SOR/2025-107 P.C. 2025-446, in a remark by Tyler Berg at Thorsteinssons, which focusses on the dissent by Supreme Court Justice Suzanne Côté, and in a primer authored by Zvi Halpern-Shavim published by the Canadian Bar Association which differentiates between an ordinary tax and a “regulatory charge”, which the GHGPPA is.

On April 14 2026, Carney suspended until September 2026 the increase in the CCT he had planned. At the time an industrial newsletter published a rotund denunciation by Ross McKitrick, Professor of Economics at the University of Guelph, of both the CCT and the ICT.

In May 2026 two economists at the Fraser Institute condemned the Industrial carbon tax (ICT).

In late August 2026 the Canadian Taxpayers Federation recommended that Carney scrap the ICT, adding to Doug Ford’s advice.

In advance of Carney’s planned CCT hike for 7 September 2026, the government announced the planned hike would not occur, and the opposition claimed victory, however temporary. In an August poll nearly two thirds of Atlantic Canadians opposed the hike, and in Newfoundland the price at the pump was already made up of 21% tax. The planned CCT increment would have been to add “10 cents per litre of gasoline and four cents per litre of diesel.” The “Spring economic update” had forecast this tax hike, so the accountants needed to rebalance their spreadsheets and to adjust the deficit numbers.

== See also ==
- R v Crown Zellerbach Canada Ltd, [1988] 1 S.C.R. 401
- Reference Re Anti-Inflation Act, [1976]
