= Reference re Greenhouse Gas Pollution Pricing Act =

Canadian legal case

- Supreme Court of Canada

Hearing: September 22–23, 2020 Judgment: 25 March 2021
- Full case name: IN THE MATTER OF References to the Court of Appeal for Saskatchewan, the Court of Appeal for Ontario and the Court of Appeal of Alberta respecting the constitutionality of the Greenhouse Gas Pollution Pricing Act, S.C. 2018, c. 12, s. 186
- Citations: 2021 SCC 11
- Docket No.: 38663,38781,39116
- Ruling: Appeals of the Attorney General of Saskatchewan and of the Attorney General of Ontario dismissed and appeal of the Attorney General of British Columbia allowed

Holding
- The GGPPA is constitutional. It sets minimum national standards of GHG price stringency to reduce GHG emissions. Parliament has jurisdiction to enact this law as a matter of national concern under the peace, order, and good government (“POGG”) clause of s. 91 of the Constitution Act, 1867.

Court membership
- Chief Justice: Richard Wagner; Puisne Justices: Rosalie Abella, Michael Moldaver, Andromache Karakatsanis, Suzanne Côté, Russell Brown, Malcolm Rowe, Sheilah Martin, Nicholas Kasirer

Reasons given
- Majority: Wagner C.J., joined by Abella, Moldaver, Karakatsanis, Martin and Kasirer JJ.
- Concur/dissent: Côté J.
- Dissent: Brown J.
- Dissent: Rowe J.

In Reference re Greenhouse Gas Pollution Pricing Act 2021 SCC 11, the Supreme Court of Canada ruled on 25 March 2021 that the federal carbon pricing law is constitutional.

== Background ==
In response to Canada's 2016 ratification of the Paris Agreement which set greenhouse gas emission reduction targets, the Canadian federal government under Prime Minister Justin Trudeau passed the Greenhouse Gas Pollution Pricing Act (GHGPPA), which came into effect on 21 June 2018, establishing national standards for a carbon price. (Note: "An Act to mitigate climate change through the pan-Canadian application of pricing mechanisms to a broad set of greenhouse gas emission sources and to make consequential amendments to other Acts")

=== Procedural history ===
The province of Saskatchewan, under Premier Scott Moe, referred a reference question to the Court of Appeal for Saskatchewan regarding the law's constitutionality. On 3 May 2019 the Court of Appeal ruled in favour of the federal government, concluding that, GHGPPA is "not unconstitutional either in whole or in part" and was a legitimate exercise of federal jurisdiction under the peace, order, and good government" (POGG) branch of the constitution (Justices Ottenbreit and Caldwell dissenting). Saskatchewan appealed this decision to the Supreme Court of Canada on 31 May 2019.

The province of Ontario, under the premiership of Doug Ford, also referred a reference question to the Court of Appeal for Ontario, seeking a finding that the GGHPPA was unconstitutional. On 28 June 2019, the ONCA issued its advisory opinion, finding the law constitutionally valid (Justice Huscroft dissenting). Ontario was granted leave to appeal this decision to the Supreme Court of Canada.

The province of Alberta, led by then-Premier Jason Kenney, referred its own reference question to the Court of Appeal of Alberta on June 20, 2019. On February 24, 2020, that court issued an opinion which found the GHGPPA unconstitutional (Justice Feehan dissenting). The Attorney General of British Columbia appealed this decision to the SCC.

== Breakdown of the decision ==
The majority found the Act to be constitutional including Chief Justice Richard Wagner and Justices Rosalie Silberman Abella, Michael J. Moldaver, Andromache Karakatsanis, Sheilah L. Martin, and Nicholas Kasirer.

Justices Russell Brown and Malcolm Rowe dissented and Justice Suzanne Côté dissented in part.

The Supreme Court said that "all of the parties agree that global climate change is real. It's caused by greenhouse gas emissions resulting from human activities and it poses a grave threat to the future of humanity."

== See also ==
- List of Supreme Court of Canada cases (Wagner Court)
- Carbon pricing in Canada
- Environmental law
- Canadian federalism
