= York University v Canadian Copyright Licensing Agency (Access Copyright) =

- Supreme Court of Canada

Hearing: 21 May 2021 Judgment: 30 July 2021
- Full case name: York University v Canadian Copyright Licensing Agency (“Access Copyright”)
- Citations: 2021 SCC 32
- Docket No.: 39222
- Prior history: APPEALS from York University v The Canadian Copyright Licensing Agency (Access Copyright), 2020 FCA 77 (22 April 2020), setting aside in part Canadian Copyright Licensing Agency v York University, 2017 FC 669, [2018] 2 FCR 43 (12 July 2017). Leave to appeal granted, York University et al v Canadian Copyright Licensing Agency ("Access Copyright") et al, 2020 CanLII 76224 (15 October 2020).
- Ruling: Appeals dismissed.

Holding
- The tariff as approved by the Copyright Board of Canada is not mandatory, and is enforceable only against those parties who obtain licences under it.; Any analysis of fair dealing must strike a balance between the University's and the student's interests in the matter.

Court membership
- Chief Justice: Richard Wagner; Puisne Justices: Rosalie Abella, Michael Moldaver, Andromache Karakatsanis, Suzanne Côté, Russell Brown, Malcolm Rowe, Sheilah Martin, Nicholas Kasirer

Reasons given
- Unanimous reasons by: Abella J

Laws applied
- Copyright Act

York University v Canadian Copyright Licensing Agency (Access Copyright), 2021 SCC 32 is a major decision of the Supreme Court of Canada in the matters of the effectiveness of copyright collectives and of fair dealing in Canadian copyright law.

== Background ==
Ever since the 2004 judgment of the SCC in CCH Canadian Ltd v Law Society of Upper Canada, many institutional users have sought to simplify the process of determining what constitutes fair dealing through the adoption of guidelines quantifying what amounts of a work may be acceptable.

When the copyright collective Access Copyright sought to enforce an Interim Tariff in December 2010 that had been approved by the Copyright Board of Canada, York University asserted that any copying it did fell outside the tariff's scope under the Fair Dealing Guidelines it had issued to define its position. In relevant part, the Guidelines stated:

II. FAIR DEALING GUIDELINES 1. Teaching Staff* and Other Staff** may copy, in paper or electronic form, Short Excerpts (defined below) from a copyright protected work, which includes literary works, musical scores, sound recordings, and audiovisual works (collectively, a “Work” within the university environment for the purposes of research, private study, criticism, review, news reporting, education, satire or parody in accordance with these Guidelines. [Definitions omitted]

2. The copy must be a “Short Excerpt”, which means that it is either:

10% or less of a Work, or
No more than:
a) one chapter from a book;
b) a single article from a periodical;
c) an entire artistic work (including a painting, photograph, diagram, drawing, map, chart and plan) from a Work containing other artistic works;
d) an entire newspaper article or page;
e) an entire single poem or musical score from a Work containing other poems or musical scores; or
f) an entire entry from an encyclopedia, annotated bibliography, dictionary or similar reference work,
whichever is greater.

3. The Short Excerpt in each case must contain no more of the work than is required in order to achieve the fair dealing purpose;

4. A single copy of a short excerpt from a copyright-protected work may be provided or communicated to each student enrolled in a class or course:

a) as a class handout;
b) as a posting to a learning or course management system (e.g. Moodle or Quickr) that is password protected or otherwise restricted to students of the university; or
c) as part of a course pack.

Access Copyright sued York University with respect to royalties due under the Interim Tariff, while York counterclaimed for a declaration stating that its Guidelines were lawful under s. 29 of the Copyright Act.

== The courts below ==
=== Federal Court of Canada ===
In a decision released in July 2017, the Federal Court of Canada concluded that Access Copyright was entitled to the royalties as stated in the Interim Tariff, and that the York University fair dealing guidelines were not fair.

==== Interim Tariff ====
The Court held that a tariff (whether interim or final) is a form of subordinate legislation that is mandatory and binding on all persons, and that there is no ability to opt out of it. "If York did not copy any works in Access’s repertoire, if it obtained proper permission to copy those works, or if the copying was exempt by law – the fair dealing defence and counterclaim – then the tariff would not be applicable. Absent these conditions, the tariff is mandatory."

==== Fair dealing ====
In that decision, emphasis was given to the fact that the CCH six-factor test was the second part of a two-stage analysis in which a user must first identify whether a use was allowed before then assessing whether dealing is fair, and stressed that users must not conflate the two stages. As to the first step:

Determination of allowable purpose under the Copyright Act
Available under s. 29	Relevant purpose in the present case
research; private study; education; parody; satire	"It is a low threshold to meet and there is no real issue that York has established that the dealing (copying) was for the allowable purpose of education."

Turning to the second step of the analysis:

The CCH six-factor test (as applied to York in the Federal Court decision)
Factor	Criteria	Analysis of York's actions	The factors as determined in this case	
Factor	Criteria	Analysis of York's actions	Fair	Unfair
Purpose of the dealing	The focus is on considering the fairness of the goal for which the permitted activity (e.g. research, education) took place. (Note: FC, par. 270); The absence of safeguards with respect to compliance tends towards unfairness. (Note: FC, par. 266)	"The goal of the dealing was multifaceted. Education was a principal goal, specifically education for end user. But the goal of the dealing was also, from York’s perspective, to keep enrolment up by keeping student costs down and to use whatever savings there may be in other parts of the university’s operation." (Note: FC, par. 273)	Not a strong factor	
Character of the dealing	Courts must examine how the work was dealt with, the number of copies made, and the extent of dissemination (Note: FC, par. 276); The "character" and "amount" inquiries must not be conflated. Specifically, the "character factor" involves a quantification of the total number of pages copied (i.e. a quantitative assessment based on aggregate use), whereas the "amount factor" is an examination of the proportion between the excerpted copy and the entire work. (Note: FC, par. 277)	"...recognizing some of the limitations in the data, it is appropriate to view the copies in total despite York’s argument that this approach disadvantages large institutions. It is York’s practices that are at issue and it is its data that is raising the issue." (Note: FC, par. 286)		✗
Amount of the dealing	This requires an assessment of both the quantitative amount of the dealing and the qualitative importance of the part copied. (Note: FC, par. 290); Where guidelines are devised to advise as to the quantity of a work that can be fairly copied, the court must consider the specified thresholds, the rationale for these thresholds, and the amount of any one type of work which can be copied. (Note: FC, par. 293); It is incumbent on the user institution to explain the basis for the delineated amounts and types (the thresholds) and to explain why they are, in and of themselves or in combination with other features, fair. (Note: FC, par. 305)	"The unfairness evident in this part of the six-factor exercise is compounded by the absence of any meaningful control over the portions of publications copied or any monitoring of compliance, be it pre- or post-copying, which also serves to render the thresholds largely meaningless." (Note: FC, par. 314)		✗
Alternatives to the dealing	The availability of a licence is not a relevant alternative in deciding whether a dealing is fair. (Note: FC, par. 320); The level of fairness depends upon whether the user has actively engaged in the consideration or use of alternatives which exist or are in development. (Note: FC, par. 329)	"While as a general principle this factor favours York and its asserted fairness, the level of fairness is diminished because York has not actively engaged in the consideration or use of alternatives which exist or are in development.... There are alternatives – these include using custom book services, purchasing individual chapters or articles from the publisher, or purchasing more of the necessary books and articles. There is just no reasonable free alternative to copying." (Note: FC, par. 329-330)	✓	
Nature of the work	The user must inquire as to whether the work is of such a nature that its reproduction would lead to a wider public dissemination of the work. (Note: FC, par. 332)	"Aside from the dependency or reliance on income from writing and publishing, the notion of the benefits of dissemination must be carefully considered. The Guidelines are not established to motivate dissemination. There is no evidence that these professional writers and publishers need the Guidelines to assist in the dissemination of their works. Dissemination may improve because under the Guidelines the works are free, but the same can be said of any goods or services that are provided for free." (Note: FC, par. 337)		✗
Effect of the dealing on the work	Concerned with the negative impacts of the dealing on the creators and publishers. (Note: FC, par. 339); If the reproduced work is likely to compete with the market of the original work, this may suggest that the dealing is not fair. (Note: FC, par. 341)	"... since the introduction of the Guidelines, there has been an acceleration of the decline in the sale of works produced for the post-secondary educational market and a transfer of wealth from content producers to content users. He stated that 'the magnitude of the overall impact [of dealing in a work] is indicative of the significance of the impact on individual works'." (Note: FC, par. 347)		✗

=== Federal Court of Appeal ===
The University's appeal to the Federal Court of Appeal was allowed in part in April 2020.

==== Nature of tariff ====
Access Copyright's tariff was held not to be of a mandatory nature, as "tariffs do not bind non-licensees". This arose from an analysis of the legislative history concerning copyright tariffs in Canada:

1. From the Act's introduction in 1921 until 1931, there was no regulation of the activities of performance rights organisations that had been formed. "[I]t was felt to be unfair and unjust that these dealers should possess the power so to control such performing rights as to enable them to exact from people purchasing gramophone records and sheets of music and radio receiving sets such tolls as it might please them to exact." (Note: Duff CJ, in Vigneux v Canadian Performing Right Society Ltd, 1943 CanLII 38 at pp. 352-353, [1943] SCR 348 (4 May 1943))
2. Amendments in 1931 required these organizations to give notice as to what works they were authorized to collect royalties on, as well as to obtain approval of applicable rates from a newly organized Copyright Appeal Board. (Note: The Copyright Amendment Act, 1931, S.C. 1931, c. 8, s. 10 , later replaced by An Act to amend The Copyright Amendment Act, 1931, S.C. 1936, c. 28, s. 2 . The current relevant provisions were reenacted in 2019, under the Budget Implementation Act, 2018, No. 2, S.C. 2018, c. 27, Part 4, Div. 7, Subdiv. H)
3. 1988 amendments extended the concept of collective rights to all forms of copyright, thus enabling other licensing bodies to be created. (Note: An Act to amend the Copyright Act and to amend other Acts in consequence thereof, S.C. 1988, c. 15 , subsequently renumbered as R.S.C. 1985, c. 10 (4th Supp.).)
4. 1997 amendments enabled the formation of the present-day framework of copyright collectives. (Note: An Act to amend the Copyright Act, S.C. 1997, c. 24)

Canadian jurisprudence has subsequently defined the nature and scope of tariffs:

- If a licensee has paid the amount due under a tariff with respect to the use of a work, he cannot be sued by a performing rights organization.
- If anyone who is not a licensee infringes copyright, the rights holder is able to apply for an injunction. (Note: FCA, par. 69, citing Rinfret J (as he then was) in Vigneux, at p. 364)
- A user is free to choose whether or not it will take a licence on the terms set out in the organization's approved statement. (Note: FCA, par. 72-73, citing Cartwright J (as he then was) in Maple Leaf Broadcasting v Composers, Authors and Publishers Association of Canada Ltd, 1954 CanLII 62 at p. 630, [1954] SCR 624 (5 October 1954))
- Organizations can not collect both licence fees and damages for the same use of a work. (Note: FCA, par. 74, citing Composers, Authors and Publishers Association of Canada, Ltd v Sandholm Holdings Ltd, [1955] ExCR 244, 24 CPR 58)
- Later amendments have not imposed mandatory requirements on users to follow approved tariffs. "[T]he Board does not make or establish tariffs at all: it approves proposed tariffs submitted to it by collective societies." (Note: relying on Canadian Broadcasting Corp v SODRAC 2003 Inc, 2015 SCC 57 at par. 107, [2015] 3 SCR 615 (26 November 2015))

==== Fair dealing ====
York's counterclaim with respect to the Federal Court's fair dealing analysis was dismissed "on the basis that its Guidelines do not ensure that copying which comes within their terms is fair dealing", noting that "York has not shown that the Federal Court erred in law in its understanding of the relevant factors or that it fell into palpable and overriding error in applying them to the facts."

==== Aftermath ====
The decision was described as "jurisprudential analysis of a high order", and several consequences therefrom were noted as possible:

- Although Access Copyright cannot rely on statutory authority to represent its members’ rights, it may be able to become their negotiating agent.
- It could restructure its activities to acquire a stake in its members’ rights, in the same manner as SOCAN has done, in order to sue directly for damages on its own behalf, and statutory damages are of sizeable amounts in comparison to what tariffs may have charged.

It was also pointed out that institutions will not be able to plead a defence of fair dealing based solely on published guidelines, without providing evidence that there are other practices and safeguards to demonstrate the policy was followed, and that copying was actually done for an allowable purpose.

In October 2020, the Supreme Court of Canada granted both parties leave to appeal.

== At the Supreme Court of Canada ==
Access Copyright's appeal was dismissed with costs. York's appeal was dismissed without costs.

=== Nature of tariff ===
There was agreement with the Federal Court of Appeal that the tariff is not enforceable against York University. It was also pointed out that the way Access Copyright's operations were structured did not enable it to pursue infringement proceedings on behalf of its members. "Nothing compels Access Copyright and its members to operate this way."

=== Fair dealing ===
By anchoring the analysis in the institutional nature of the copying and York’s purported commercial purpose, the nature of fair dealing as a user’s right was overlooked and the fairness assessment was over before it began.

SCC, par. 89

Drawing upon its reasoning in Daniels v Canada (Indian Affairs and Northern Development), the Court recalled, "The party seeking [declatory] relief must establish that the court has jurisdiction to hear the issue, that the question is real and not theoretical, and that the party raising the issue has a genuine interest in its resolution." (Note: SCC. par. 83, citing Abella J in Daniels v Canada (Indian Affairs and Northern Development), 2016 SCC 12 at par. 11, [2016] 1 SCR 99 (14 April 2016)) Because the tariff in question was unenforceable, there was thus no live dispute. As this was not an action for infringement, the defence of fair dealing did not need to arise. However, the Court found the reasoning of the lower courts flawed in this matter, as it "approached the analysis from an institutional perspective only, leaving out the perspective of the students who use the materials. Both perspectives should be taken into account."

== Aftermath ==
York University subsequent released a statement, in which it asserted that its Guidelines had already addressed the concerns concerning students' rights expressed in the Supreme Court decision. In its statement, Access Copyright pointed out that the economic harm had been proven in court and the Supreme Court had refused to endorse York's Guidelines, and also called on the federal government to enable collectives to pursue enforcement measures more effectively. That sentiment was supported by Copibec and other Quebec publishing organizations, who stated, "We can only applaud the Supreme Court’s refusal to endorse the abusive interpretations of York University and other universities wishing to reproduce works on a massive scale without compensating rights holders."

Concerns were also expressed that the movement towards guidelines that address the user rights of both institutions and students would probably take years because of further resulting litigation, and political intervention may yet be necessary. In Quebec, Université Laval had attempted similar tactics in the matter to York's, but had reached an out-of-court settlement in 2018 that agreed to institute copyright compliance in line with what was already in place at other universities in the province.
