= General Motors of Canada Ltd v City National Leasing =

- Supreme Court of Canada

Hearing: May 17, 18, 1988 Judgment: April 20, 1989
- Full case name: General Motors of Canada Limited v City National Leasing
- Citations: 1989 CanLII 133 (SCC), [1989] 1 SCR 641
- Docket No.: 19724
- Prior history: APPEAL from a judgment of the Ontario Court of Appeal, (1986), 28 DLR (4th) 158, allowing in part an appeal from a judgment of Rosenberg J, (1984), 12 DLR (4th) 273.
- Ruling: Appeal dismissed; both constitutional questions should be answered in the affirmative.

Court membership
- Chief Justice: Brian Dickson; Puisne Justices: Jean Beetz, William McIntyre, Antonio Lamer, Bertha Wilson, Gerald Le Dain, Gérard La Forest, Claire L'Heureux-Dubé, John Sopinka

Reasons given
- Unanimous reasons by: Dickson CJ

Laws applied
- Combines Investigation Act, R.S.C. 1970, c. C-23

General Motors of Canada Ltd v City National Leasing is a leading Supreme Court of Canada decision on the scope of the Trade and Commerce power of the Constitution Act, 1867 as well as the interpretation of the Ancillary doctrine.

== Background ==
From 1970 through 1980, General Motors (GM) sold vehicles to both City National Leasing (CNL) and to CNL's competitors. It was discovered that GM, through GMAC (now Ally Financial), was giving CNL's competitor a better interest rate than CNL. CNL contended that this was a practice of price discrimination contrary to s. 34(1)(a) of the Combines Investigation Act, giving it a cause for action under s. 31.1 of the Act. It sued GM for lost profits, related interest, and breach of contract for damages arising after March 1980.

In its defence, GM argued that:

- certain paragraphs of the statement of claim should be struck out as disclosing no cause of action because GM had never made any sales directly to CNL or to its competitors, and thus s. 34(1)(a) of the Act did not apply
- s. 31.1 is ultra vires Parliament, being in pith and substance legislation in relation to provincial jurisdiction for property and civil rights and matters of a local or private nature
- alternatively, if s. 31.1 is valid, it is not retrospective and therefore gives a cause of action only after its proclamation on January 1, 1976.

== The courts below ==
At trial, Rosenberg J accepted GM's first argument, and advised counsel that in view of this finding there was no need to direct argument toward the ultra vires point, the constitutional issue being academic. He did, though, present his views on the arguments that had been raised as to constitutionality. Citing several authorities, he held that the right of a private individual to sue is not truly necessary for the Combines Investigation Act to be effective, and, accordingly, s. 31.1 is ultra vires the Parliament of Canada. He also agreed with GM's third argument, stating that the section was not retrospective, thus not applying to transactions occurring prior to 1976.

The Ontario Court of Appeal allowed appeal in part. In dealing with the three issues at hand, it declared:

- it was not persuaded that CNL could not hope to succeed in asserting a claim founded on s. 34(1) if the matter were to go to trial.
- the judge had erred in proceeding to make a finding after having indicated to counsel that he need not hear argument on the matter.
- the judge was correct in stating that the section did not have retrospective effect.

At the request of all counsel, it dealt with the issue of the validity of s. 31.1, and declared that, on the basis of contemporary jurisprudence at the Federal Court of Appeal, the section was constitutionally valid.

Leave was granted by the Supreme Court of Canada to appeal, and the case was heard in conjunction with an appeal from the corresponding case from the Federal Court of Appeal.

== At the Supreme Court of Canada ==
The issues before the Supreme Court were whether:

1. the Combines Investigation Act, either in whole or in part, was intra vires Parliament under s. 91(2) of the Constitution Act, 1867, and
2. s. 31.1 of the Act (which created a civil cause of action) was integrated with the Act in such a way that it too was intra vires under s. 91(2)

=== The nature of the trade and commerce power ===
In a unanimous decision, Dickson CJ found that the Act was valid under the general branch of the trade and commerce power, and that the provisions necessarily incidental to the valid subject of the Act were thus valid as well. In so ruling, he listed several indicators which — while neither exhaustive nor necessarily decisive — may be used in identifying such validity:

1. the impugned legislation must be part of a general regulatory scheme
2. the scheme must be monitored by the continuing oversight of a regulatory agency
3. the legislation must be concerned with trade as a whole rather than with a particular industry
4. the legislation should be of a nature that the provinces jointly or severally would be constitutionally incapable of enacting
5. the failure to include one or more provinces or localities in a legislative scheme would jeopardize the successful operation of the scheme in other parts of the country

In the case at hand, the SCC found that the Act was of national scope, aimed at the economy as a single integrated national unit rather than as a collection of separate local enterprises. The provinces jointly or severally would be constitutionally incapable of passing this legislation, and the failure to include one or more provinces or localities would jeopardize successful operation of the legislation in other parts of the country.

=== Effect of the ancillary doctrine ===
Previous jurisprudence had formulated a number of tests, which were not identical, for determining whether a provision is sufficiently integrated into legislation for sustaining its constitutionality under the ancillary doctrine. Dickson CJ noted that such cases focused the question on a context-specific way, which did not lend to general principles, and said:

As the seriousness of the encroachment on provincial powers varies, so does the test required to ensure that an appropriate constitutional balance is maintained. In surveying past jurisprudence it is to be expected that some example of patterns between the appropriate test of fit, and the head of power under which the federal legislation is valid, will be found. Such patterns exist not only because of a possible degree of similarity between the federal legislation which falls under any one head of power, but also for the reason that certain federal heads of power, for example, s. 92(10), are narrow and distinct powers which relate to particular works and undertakings and are thus quite susceptible to having provisions "tacked-on" to legislation which is validated under them, while other federal heads of power, for example, trade and commerce, are broad and therefore less likely to give rise to highly intrusive provisions.

He summarized and outlined the analysis to be used in that regard in future cases:

- The court must determine whether the impugned provision can be viewed as intruding on provincial powers, and if so to what extent.
- It must establish whether the act (or a severable part of it) in which the impugned provision is found is valid.

- In cases under the second branch of s. 91(2) this will normally involve finding the presence of a regulatory scheme and then ascertaining whether the hallmarks articulated by the Court have been met by the scheme. If the scheme is not valid, that is the end of the inquiry.

- If the regulatory scheme is declared valid, the court must then determine whether the impugned provision is sufficiently integrated with the scheme that it can be upheld by virtue of that relationship. This requires considering the seriousness of the encroachment on provincial powers, in order to decide on the proper standard for such a relationship. If the provision passes this integration test, it is intra vires Parliament as an exercise of the general trade and commerce power. If the provision is not sufficiently integrated into the scheme of regulation, it cannot be sustained under the second branch of s. 91(2).

In certain cases, it may be possible to dispense with some of the aforementioned steps if a clear answer to one of them will deal with the issue. For example, if the provision in question has no relation to the regulatory scheme, the question of its validity may be quickly answered on that ground alone.

== Impact ==
General Motors, together with Kirkbi AG v. Ritvik Holdings Inc., are leading cases on the scope of Parliament's trade and commerce power, particularly with respect to the general branch of that power. It reflects the current view of the Court that favours interprovincial economic integration, especially with the respect to the views expressed by Peter Hogg and Warren Grover:

It is surely obvious that major regulation of the Canadian economy has to be national. Goods and services, and the cash or credit which purchases them, flow freely from one part of the country to another without regard for provincial boundaries. Indeed, a basic concept of the federation is that it must be an economic union.... The relative unimportance of provincial boundaries has become progressively more obvious as industry has tended to become more concentrated.

== See also ==
- Mcgee v. General Motors
- List of Supreme Court of Canada cases (Dickson Court)
