= List of Supreme Court of Canada cases =

The Supreme Court of Canada is the court of last resort and final appeal in Canada. Cases successfully appealed to the Court are generally of national importance. Once a case is decided, the court publishes written reasons for the decision, that consist of one or more sets of reasons from any number of the nine justices. Understanding the background of the cases, the reasoning and the authorship can be important and insightful, as each judge may have varying beliefs in legal theory and interpretation.

== List of cases by Court era ==
- List of Supreme Court of Canada cases (Richards Court through Fauteux Court): This list includes cases from the formation of the Court on April 8, 1875, through to the retirement of Gérald Fauteux on December 23, 1973.
- List of Supreme Court of Canada cases (Laskin Court): This list includes cases from the rise of Bora Laskin through to his death on March 26, 1984.
- List of Supreme Court of Canada cases (Dickson Court): This list includes cases from the rise of Brian Dickson through to his retirement on June 30, 1990.
- List of Supreme Court of Canada cases (Lamer Court): This list includes cases from the elevation to Chief Justice of Antonio Lamer on July 1, 1990, to his retirement on January 6, 2000.
- List of Supreme Court of Canada cases (McLachlin Court): This list includes cases from the elevation to Chief Justice of Beverley McLachlin on January 12, 2000, to her retirement on December 15, 2017.
- List of Supreme Court of Canada cases (Wagner Court) This list includes cases from the elevation to Chief Justice of Richard Wagner on December 18, 2017, to the present.

== List of reasons given by year ==
- 1984 reasons of the Supreme Court of Canada
- 1985 reasons of the Supreme Court of Canada
- 1986 reasons of the Supreme Court of Canada
- 1987 judgments of the Supreme Court of Canada
- 1988 judgments of the Supreme Court of Canada
- 1989 reasons of the Supreme Court of Canada
- 1990 reasons of the Supreme Court of Canada
- 1991 reasons of the Supreme Court of Canada
- 1992 reasons of the Supreme Court of Canada
- 1993 reasons of the Supreme Court of Canada
- 1994 reasons of the Supreme Court of Canada
- 1995 reasons of the Supreme Court of Canada
- 1996 reasons of the Supreme Court of Canada
- 1997 reasons of the Supreme Court of Canada
- 1998 reasons of the Supreme Court of Canada
- 1999 reasons of the Supreme Court of Canada
- 2000 reasons of the Supreme Court of Canada
- 2001 reasons of the Supreme Court of Canada
- 2002 reasons of the Supreme Court of Canada
- 2003 reasons of the Supreme Court of Canada
- 2004 reasons of the Supreme Court of Canada
- 2005 reasons of the Supreme Court of Canada
- 2006 reasons of the Supreme Court of Canada
- 2007 reasons of the Supreme Court of Canada
- 2008 reasons of the Supreme Court of Canada
- 2009 reasons of the Supreme Court of Canada
- 2010 reasons of the Supreme Court of Canada
- 2011 reasons of the Supreme Court of Canada
- 2012 reasons of the Supreme Court of Canada
- 2013 reasons of the Supreme Court of Canada
- 2014 reasons of the Supreme Court of Canada
- 2015 reasons of the Supreme Court of Canada
- 2016 reasons of the Supreme Court of Canada
- 2017 reasons of the Supreme Court of Canada
- 2018 reasons of the Supreme Court of Canada
- 2019 reasons of the Supreme Court of Canada
- 2020 reasons of the Supreme Court of Canada
- 2021 reasons of the Supreme Court of Canada
- 2022 reasons of the Supreme Court of Canada
- 2023 reasons of the Supreme Court of Canada
- 2024 judgments of the Supreme Court of Canada
- 2025 judgments of the Supreme Court of Canada
- 2026 judgments of the Supreme Court of Canada

== See also ==
- List of Judicial Committee of the Privy Council cases originating in Canada
- List of notable Canadian Courts of Appeals cases
- List of notable Canadian lower court cases
- List of Vancouver court cases
