= 2010 reasons of the Supreme Court of Canada =

The table below lists decisions (known as reasons) delivered from the bench by the Supreme Court of Canada during 2010. The table illustrates what reasons were filed by each justice in each case, and which justices joined each reason. This list, however, does not include reasons on motions.

== Reasons ==
Delivered the Court's reason
Joined the Court's reason
Filed a concurrence
Joined a concurrence
Filed a dissent
Joined a dissent
Filed a concurrence/dissent
Joined a concurrence/dissent
Did not participate in the judgment
Did not participate in the final disposition of the judgment
Not a member of the Court at the time of hearing or delivering
- Decisions that do not note a Justice delivering the Court's reason are per coram.
- Multiple concurrences and dissents within a case are numbered, with joining votes numbered accordingly. Justices occasionally join multiple reasons in a single case; each vote is subdivided accordingly.
- Multiple unnumbered reasons are jointly written or delivered.
- Decisions that are given orally from the bench are denoted by a "V"; per coram decisions delivered orally from the bench only note a "V" on the most senior justice on the panel.
- An asterisk ( * ) in the Court's opinion denotes that it was only a majority in part or a plurality.

Case name	Argued	Decided	McLachlin	Binnie	LeBel	Deschamps	Fish	Abella	Charron	Rothstein	Cromwell
R v JZS, 2010 SCC 1, [2010] 1 S.C.R. 3	January 19, 2010	January 19, 2010	V
MiningWatch Canada v Canada (Fisheries and Oceans), 2010 SCC 2, [2010] 1 S.C.R. 6	October 16, 2009	January 21, 2010
Canada (Prime Minister) v Khadr, 2010 SCC 3, [2010] 1 S.C.R. 44	November 13, 2009	August 14, 2010
Tercon Contractors Ltd v British Columbia (Transportation and Highways), 2010 SCC 4, [2010] 1 S.C.R. 69	March 23, 2009	February 12, 2010
Fullowka v Pinkerton's of Canada, 2010 SCC 5, [2010] 1 S.C.R. 132	May 14, 2009	February 18, 2010
R v Nasogaluak, 2010 SCC 6, [2010] 1 S.C.R. 206	May 20, 2009	February 19, 2010
R v Beaulieu, 2010 SCC 7, [2010] 1 S.C.R. 248	January 12, 2010	February 25, 2010
R v Morelli, 2010 SCC 8, [2010] 1 S.C.R. 253	February 18, 2009	March 19, 2010
R v Baker, 2010 SCC 9, [2010] 1 S.C.R. 329		March 19, 2010			V
R v Cunningham, 2010 SCC 10, [2010] 1 S.C.R. 331	November 17, 2009	March 26, 2010
Case name	Argued	Decided	McLachlin	Binnie	LeBel	Deschamps	Fish	Abella	Charron	Rothstein	Cromwell
Reference Re Broome v Prince Edward Island, 2010 SCC 11, [2010] 1 S.C.R. 360	November 10, 2009	April 1, 2010
R v Laboucan, 2010 SCC 12, [2010] 1 S.C.R. 397	December 10, 2009	April 8, 2010
R v Briscoe, 2010 SCC 13, [2010] 1 S.C.R. 411	December 10, 2009	April 8, 2010
Montréal (City) v Montreal Port Authority, 2010 SCC 14, [2010] 1 S.C.R. 427	December 10, 2009	April 8, 2010
R v Szczerbaniwicz, 2010 SCC 15, [2010] 1 S.C.R. 455	February 8, 2010	May 6, 2010
R v National Post, 2010 SCC 16, [2010] 1 S.C.R. 477	May 22, 2009	May 7, 2010
Quebec (AG) v Moses, 2010 SCC 17, [2010] 1 S.C.R. 557	June 8, 2009	May 14, 2010
R v Hurley, 2010 SCC 18, [2010] 1 S.C.R. 637	March 23, 2010	May 14, 2010
Yugraneft Corp v Rexx Management Corp, 2010 SCC 19, [2010] 1 S.C.R. 649	December 9, 2009	May 20, 2010
R v SGT, 2010 SCC 20, [2010] 1 S.C.R. 688	November 18, 2009	May 27, 2010
Case name	Argued	Decided	McLachlin	Binnie	LeBel	Deschamps	Fish	Abella	Charron	Rothstein	Cromwell
Toronto Star Newspapers Ltd v Canada, 2010 SCC 21, [2010] 1 S.C.R. 721	November 16, 2009	June 10, 2010
R v Conway, 2010 SCC 22, [2010] 1 S.C.R. 765	October 22, 2009	June 11, 2010
Ontario (Public Safety and Security) v Criminal Lawyers' Association, 2010 SCC 23, [2010] 1 S.C.R. 815	December 11, 2008	June 17, 2010
R v Nolet, 2010 SCC 24, [2010] 1 S.C.R. 851	December 14, 2009	June 25, 2010
R v Levigne, 2010 SCC 25, [2010] 2 S.C.R. 3	May 17, 2010	July 15, 2010
Vancouver (City) v Ward, 2010 SCC 27, [2010] 2 S.C.R. 28	January 18, 2010	July 23, 2010
Syndicat de la fonction publique du Québec v Québec (AG), 2010 SCC 28, [2010] 2 S.C.R. 61	October 20, 2010	July 29, 2010
Syndicat des professeurs du Cégep de Ste-Foy v Québec (AG), 2010 SCC 29, [2010] 2 S.C.R. 123	October 20, 2010	July 29, 2010
Syndicat des professeurs et des professeures de l'Université du Québec à Trois‑Rivières v Université du Québec à Trois‑Rivières, 2010 SCC 30, [2010] 2 S.C.R. 132	October 20, 2010	July 29, 2010
R v Cornell, 2010 SCC 31, [2010] 2 S.C.R. 142	November 20, 2009	July 30, 2010
Case name	Argued	Decided	McLachlin	Binnie	LeBel	Deschamps	Fish	Abella	Charron	Rothstein	Cromwell
R v Pickton, 2010 SCC 32, [2010] 2 S.C.R. 198	March 25, 2010	July 30, 2010
Progressive Homes Ltd v Lombard General Insurance Co of Canada, 2010 SCC 33, [2010] 2 S.C.R. 245	April 20, 2010	September 23, 2010
Burke v Hudson's Bay Co, 2010 SCC 34	May 18, 2010	October 7, 2010
R v Sinclair, 2010 SCC 35	May 12, 2009	October 8, 2010		1	2		2	2
R v McCrimmon, 2010 SCC 36	May 12, 2009	October 8, 2010
R v Willier, 2010 SCC 37	May 12, 2009	October 8, 2010		1	2		2	2
Quebec (AG) v Lacombe, 2010 SCC 38	October 14, 2009	October 15, 2010
Quebec (AG) v Canadian Owners and Pilots Association, 2010 SCC 39	October 14, 2009	October 15, 2010			1	2
Globe and Mail v Canada (AG), 2010 SCC 41	October 21, 2009	October 22, 2010
Case name	Argued	Decided	McLachlin	Binnie	LeBel	Deschamps	Fish	Abella	Charron	Rothstein	Cromwell
R v Allen, 2010 SCC 42	October 8, 2010	October 27, 2010
Rio Tinto Alcan Inc v Carrier Sekani Tribal Council, 2010 SCC 43	May 21, 2010	October 28, 2010
Christensen v Roman Catholic Archbishop of Québec, 2010 SCC 44	October 13, 2010	October 29, 2010
NIL/TU,O Child and Family Services Society v BC Government and Service Employees' Union, 2010 SCC 45	December 8, 2009	November 4, 2010
Communications, Energy and Paperworkers Union of Canada v Native Child and Family Services of Toronto, 2010 SCC 46	December 8, 2009	November 4, 2010
Bank of Montreal v Innovation Credit Union, 2010 SCC 47	April 19, 2010	November 5, 2010
Royal Bank of Canada v Radius Credit Union Ltd, 2010 SCC 48	April 19, 2010	November 5, 2010
R v Lutoslawski, 2010 SCC 49	November 5, 2010	November 5, 2010		V
R v Imoro, 2010 SCC 50	November 5, 2010	November 5, 2010			V
de Montigny v Brossard (Succession), 2010 SCC 51	April 14, 2010	November 10, 2010
Case name	Argued	Decided	McLachlin	Binnie	LeBel	Deschamps	Fish	Abella	Charron	Rothstein	Cromwell
R v Lee, 2010 SCC 52	November 3, 2010	November 12, 2010
Beckman v Little Salmon/Carmacks First Nation, 2010 SCC 53	November 12, 2009	November 19, 2010
R v Gomboc, 2010 SCC 55	May 19, 2010	November 24, 2010
Németh v Canada (Justice), 2010 SCC 56	January 13, 2010	November 25, 2010
Gavrila v Canada (Justice), 2010 SCC 57	January 13, 2010	November 25, 2010
R v Tran, 2010 SCC 58	May 13, 2010	November 26, 2010
Century Services Inc v Canada (AG), 2010 SCC 60	May 11, 2010	December 16, 2010
Reference Re Assisted Human Reproduction Act, 2010 SCC 61	April 24, 2010	December 22, 2010	1	1	2	2	1	2	1	2	3
Canada (AG) v TeleZone Inc, 2010 SCC 62	January 21, 2010	December 23, 2010
Canada (AG) v McArthur, 2010 SCC 63	January 20, 2010	December 23, 2010
Case name	Argued	Decided	McLachlin	Binnie	LeBel	Deschamps	Fish	Abella	Charron	Rothstein	Cromwell
Parrish & Heimbecker Ltd v Canada (Agriculture and Agri-Food), 2010 SCC 64	January 20/21, 2010	December 23, 2010
Nu-Pharm Inc v Canada (AG), 2010 SCC 65	January 20/21, 2010	December 23, 2010
Canadian Food Inspection Agency v Professional Institute of the Public Service of Canada, 2010 SCC 66	January 20, 2010	December 23, 2010
Manuge v Canada, 2010 SCC 67	January 20, 2010	December 23, 2010

== 2010 Statistics ==
Legend:

M : Majority

C : Concurrence with majority

D : Dissent

DP : Dissenting in part

Justice	Reasons written	% Majority
	M / C / D / DP / Total
McLachlin	10 / 2 / 0 / 1 / 13	45 of 50 (90%)
Binnie	7 / 2 / 0 / 3 / 12	50 of 59 (84.7%)
LeBel	10 / 3 / 0 / 5 / 18	53 of 59 (89.8%)
Deschamps	4 / 1 / 2 / 5 / 12	52 of 59 (88.1%)
Fish	2 / 4 / 0 / 5 / 11	50 of 57 (87.7%)
Abella	6 / 1 / 0 / 3 / 10	54 of 61 (88.5%)
Charron	12 / 0 / 0 / 0 / 12	60 of 62 (96.8%)
Rothstein	8 / 0 / 0 / 0 / 8	54 of 59 (91.5%)
Cromwell	9 / 0 / 0 / 0 / 9	56 of 56 (100%)
Notes on statistics: A justice is only included in the majority if they have concurred in the Court's judgment in full. Percentages are based only on the cases in which a justice participated, and are rounded to the nearest decimal.
