= 1992 reasons of the Supreme Court of Canada =

The list below consists of the reasons delivered from the bench by the Supreme Court of Canada during 1992. This list, however, does not include decisions on motions.

== Reasons ==
Delivered the Court's reason
Joined the Court's reason
Filed a concurrence
Joined a concurrence
Filed a dissent
Joined a dissent
Filed a concurrence/dissent
Joined a concurrence/dissent
Did not participate in the judgment
Did not participate in the final disposition of the judgment
Not a member of the Court at the time of hearing or delivering
- Decisions that do not note a Justice delivering the Court's reason are per coram.
- Multiple concurrences and dissents within a case are numbered, with joining votes numbered accordingly. Justices occasionally join multiple reasons in a single case; each vote is subdivided accordingly.
- Multiple unnumbered reasons are jointly written or delivered.
- Decisions that are given orally from the bench are denoted by a "V"; per coram decisions delivered orally from the bench only note a "V" on the most senior justice on the panel.
- An asterisk ( * ) in the Court's opinion denotes that it was only a majority in part or a plurality.

Case name	Argued	Decided	Lamer	La Forest	L'Heureux-Dubé	Sopinka	Gonthier	Cory	McLachlin	Stevenson	Iacobucci	Major
Friends of the Oldman River Society v. Canada (Minister of Transport), [1992] 1 SCR 3	February 19, 20, 1991	January 23, 1992										
R. v. Bain, [1992] 1 SCR 91		January 23, 1992										
R. v. Lohnes, [1992] 1 SCR 167	November 1, 1991	January 23, 1992										
M. (M.E.) v. L. (P.), [1992] 1 SCR 183	October 2, 1991	January 23, 1992										
Reference re Manitoba Language Rights, [1992] 1 SCR 212	October 8, 1991	January 23, 1992										
Canadian Council of Churches v. Canada (Minister of Employment and Immigration), [1992] 1 SCR 236	October 11, 1991	January 23, 1992										
R. v. Morin, [1992] 3 SCR 286	January 30, 1992	January 30, 1992										
T. (K.N.) v. P. (G.R.), [1992] 1 SCR 210	February 5, 1992	February 5, 1992										
R. v. Généreux, [1992] 1 SCR 259	June 5, 1991	February 13, 1992										
R. v. Forster, [1992] 1 SCR 339	June 5, 1991	February 13, 1992										
Lapointe v. Hôpital Le Gardeur, [1992] 1 SCR 351	October 3, 1991	February 13, 1992										
Lapointe v. Hôpital Le Gardeur, [1992] 1 SCR 382		February 13, 1992										
Thomson v. Canada (Deputy Minister of Agriculture), [1992] 1 SCR 385	October 28, 1991	February 13, 1992										
Québec (Communauté urbaine) v. Services de santé du Québec, [1992] 1 SCR 426	December 5, 1991	February 13, 1992										
Life Underwriters Assn. of Canada v. Provincial Assn. of Quebec Life Underwriters, [1992] 1 SCR 449	February 26, 1992	February 26, 1992										
Case name	Argued	Decided	Lamer	La Forest	L'Heureux-Dubé	Sopinka	Gonthier	Cory	McLachlin	Stevenson	Iacobucci	Major
R. v. Butler, [1992] 1 SCR 452		February 27, 1992										
R. v. Wise, [1992] 1 SCR 527	June 25, 1991	February 27, 1992										
Sinclair v. Quebec (Attorney General), [1992] 1 SCR 579	October 9, 1991	February 27, 1992										
R. v. Clunas, [1992] 1 SCR 595	November 12, 1991	February 27, 1992										
R. v. Green, [1992] 1 SCR 614	February 7, 1992	February 27, 1992										
R. v. Moore, [1992] 1 SCR 619	February 28, 1992	February 28, 1992										
Quebec (Attorney General) v. Transport G. Courchesne Inc., [1992] 1 SCR 621	February 28, 1992	February 28, 1992										
Lefebvre v. HOJ Industries Ltd., [1992] 1 SCR 831	March 2, 1992	March 2, 1992										
Newfoundland Telephone Co. v. Newfoundland (Board of Commissioners of Public Utilities), [1992] 1 SCR 623	November 7, 1991	March 5, 1992										
Frenette v. Metropolitan Life Insurance Co., [1992] 1 SCR 647	November 6, 1991	March 12, 1992										
R. v. Milne, [1992] 1 SCR 697	November 4, 1991	March 26, 1992										
Canada (Minister of Employment and Immigration) v. Chiarelli, [1992] 1 SCR 711	October 28, 1991	March 26, 1992										
R. v. T. (V.), [1992] 1 SCR 749	January 29, 1992	March 26, 1992										
R. v. Morin, [1992] 1 SCR 771	October 1, 1991	March 26, 1992										
R. v. Sharma, [1992] 1 SCR 814	October 1, 1991	March 26, 1992										
Case name	Argued	Decided	Lamer	La Forest	L'Heureux-Dubé	Sopinka	Gonthier	Cory	McLachlin	Stevenson	Iacobucci	Major
R. v. Duncanson, [1992] 1 SCR 836	March 30, 1992	March 30, 1992										
R. v. Martin, [1992] 1 SCR 838	March 30, 1992	March 30, 1992										
R. v. Ellis-Don Ltd., [1992] 1 SCR 840	March 31, 1992	March 31, 1992										
R. v. CIP Inc., [1992] 1 SCR 843	June 27, 1991	April 9, 1992										
Reference re Milgaard (Can.), [1992] 1 SCR 866	January 16, 21‑24, February 17‑20, March 4, 9‑12, April 6, 1992	April 14, 1992										
Williams v. Canada, [1992] 1 SCR 877	October 10, 1991	April 16, 1992										
United Nurses of Alberta v. Alberta (Attorney General), [1992] 1 SCR 901	December 3, 1991	April 16, 1992										
Tremblay v. Quebec (Commission des affaires sociales), [1992] 1 SCR 952	February 27, 1992	April 16, 1992										
R. v. Van Haarlem, [1992] 1 SCR 982	April 27, 1992	April 27, 1992										
R. v. M. (W.H.), [1992] 1 SCR 984	April 27, 1992	April 27, 1992										
R. v. Pasini, [1992] 1 SCR 1017	April 29, 1992	April 29, 1992										
Machtinger v. HOJ Industries Ltd., [1992] 1 SCR 986	March 2, 1992	April 30, 1992										
R. v. Neverson, [1992] 1 SCR 1014	April 30, 1992	April 30, 1992										
Canadian National Railway Co. v. Norsk Pacific Steamship Co., [1992] 1 SCR 1021	May 2, 1991	April 30, 1992										
Canada Deposit Insurance Corp. v. Canadian Commercial Bank, [1992] 2 SCR 3	May 6, 1992	May 6, 1992										
Case name	Argued	Decided	Lamer	La Forest	L'Heureux-Dubé	Sopinka	Gonthier	Cory	McLachlin	Stevenson	Iacobucci	Major
Bovey v. Gananoque (Town), [1992] 2 SCR 5	May 6, 1992	May 6, 1992										
Canadian Union of Public Employees v. Canadian Broadcasting Corp., [1992] 2 SCR 7	May 7, 1992	May 7, 1992										
Re Canada Labour Code, [1992] 2 SCR 50	December 11, 1991	May 21, 1992										
R. v. Downey, [1992] 2 SCR 10	November 1, 1991	May 21, 1992										
R. v. D. (S.), [1992] 2 SCR 161	June 4, 1992	June 4, 1992										
R. v. Murdock, [1992] 2 SCR 164	June 4, 1992	June 4, 1992										
Reference re Milgaard (Can.), [1992] 1 SCR 875	February 3, 1992	June 4, 1992										
R. v. J. (M.A.), [1992] 2 SCR 166	June 5, 1992	June 5, 1992										
R. v. Bennett, [1992] 2 SCR 168	June 5, 1992	June 5, 1992										
Strang v. Strang, [1992] 2 SCR 112	April 1, 1992	June 11, 1992										
R. v. W. (R.), [1992] 2 SCR 122	April 2, 1992	June 11, 1992										
McInerney v. MacDonald, [1992] 2 SCR 138	February 5, 1992	June 11, 1992										
R. v. Kelly, [1992] 2 SCR 170	October 31, 1991	June 11, 1992										
R. v. Arnold, [1992] 2 SCR 208	November 8, 1991	June 11, 1992										
R. v. Guthrie, [1992] 2 SCR 222	June 16, 1992	June 16, 1992										
Case name	Argued	Decided	Lamer	La Forest	L'Heureux-Dubé	Sopinka	Gonthier	Cory	McLachlin	Stevenson	Iacobucci	Major
Norberg v. Wynrib, [1992] 2 SCR 226	June 19, 1991	June 18, 1992										
Zurich Insurance Co. v. Ontario (Human Rights Commission), [1992] 2 SCR 321	November 5, 1991	June 25, 1992										
Chrysler Canada Ltd. v. Canada (Competition Tribunal), [1992] 2 SCR 394	January 31, 1992	June 25, 1992										
Reference re Goods and Services Tax, [1992] 2 SCR 445	February 24, 25, 1992	June 25, 1992										
Garcia Transport Ltée v. Royal Trust Co., [1992] 2 SCR 499	February 25, 1992	June 25, 1992										
Bank of Montreal v. Bail Ltée, [1992] 2 SCR 554	March 6, 1992	June 25, 1992										
R. v. Nova Scotia Pharmaceutical Society, [1992] 2 SCR 606	December 4, 1991	July 9, 1992										
R. v. Deruelle, [1992] 2 SCR 663	May 1, 1992	July 9, 1992										
Schachter v. Canada, [1992] 2 SCR 679	December 12, 1991	July 9, 1992										
R. v. Zundel, [1992] 2 SCR 731	December 10, 1991	August 27, 1992										
R. v. Barbeau, [1992] 2 SCR 845	April 30, 1992	August 27, 1992										
R. v. Sims, [1992] 2 SCR 858	June 15, 1992	August 27, 1992										
R. v. Parks, [1992] 2 SCR 871	January 27 1992	August 27, 1992										
R. v. Smith, [1992] 2 SCR 915	June 15, 1992	August 27, 1992										
Pax Management Ltd. v. Canadian Imperial Bank of Commerce, [1992] 2 SCR 998	March 26, 1992	September 24, 1992										
Case name	Argued	Decided	Lamer	La Forest	L'Heureux-Dubé	Sopinka	Gonthier	Cory	McLachlin	Stevenson	Iacobucci	Major
R. v. Z. (D.A.), [1992] 2 SCR 1025	April 28, 1992 rehearing: June 9, 1992	September 24, 1992										
Vidéotron Ltée v. Industries Microlec Produits Électroniques Inc., [1992] 2 SCR 1065	March 26, 1992	September 24, 1992										
Dickason v. University of Alberta, [1992] 2 SCR 1103	May 5, 1992	September 24, 1992										
Norberg v. Wynrib, [1992] 2 SCR 318	September 24, 1992	September 24, 1992										
R. v. DeSousa, [1992] 2 SCR 944	December 13, 1991	September 24, 1992										
Central Okanagan School District No. 23 v. Renaud, [1992] 2 SCR 970	March 24, 1992	September 24, 1992										
R. v. Rube, [1992] 3 SCR 159	October 9, 1992	October 9, 1992										
R. v. Ewert, [1992] 3 SCR 161	October 14, 1992	October 14, 1992										
Haig v. Canada (Chief Electoral Officer), [1992] 3 SCR 163	October 22, 1992	October 22, 1992										
M.(K.) v. M.(H.), [1992] 3 SCR 6	November 8, 1991	October 29, 1992										
Brissette Estate v. Westbury Life Insurance Co.; Brissette Estate v. Crown Life Insurance Co., [1992] 3 SCR 87	February 27, 1992	October 29, 1992										
Ciba-Geigy Canada Ltd. v. Apotex Inc., [1992] 3 SCR 120	March 27, 1992	October 29, 1992										
Lakeside Colony of Hutterian Brethren v. Hofer, [1992] 3 SCR 165	May 5, 1992	October 29, 1992										
Kelvin Energy Ltd. v. Lee, [1992] 3 SCR 235	May 27, 1992	October 29, 1992										
Lalonde v. Sun Life Assurance Co. of Canada, [1992] 3 SCR 261	May 27, 1992	October 29, 1992										
Case name	Argued	Decided	Lamer	La Forest	L'Heureux-Dubé	Sopinka	Gonthier	Cory	McLachlin	Stevenson	Iacobucci	Major
London Drugs Ltd. v. Kuehne & Nagel International Ltd., [1992] 3 SCR 299	October 29, 1991	October 29, 1992										
R. v. Hawkins, [1992] 3 SCR 463	November 2, 1992	November 2, 1992										
R. v. Atkinson, [1992] 3 SCR 465	November 2, 1992	November 2, 1992										
R. v. Babinski, [1992] 3 SCR 467	November 4, 1992	November 4, 1992										
R. v. Lebeau, [1992] 3 SCR 469	November 6, 1992	November 6, 1992										
R. v. N. (C.), [1992] 3 SCR 471	November 13, 1992	November 13, 1992										
R. v. Comeau, [1992] 3 SCR 473	November 13, 1992	November 13, 1992										
Peel (Regional Municipality) v. Canada; Peel (Regional Municipality) v. Ontario, [1992] 3 SCR 762	June 2, 1992	November 19, 1992										
McVey (Re); McVey v. United States of America, [1992] 3 SCR 475	October 30, 1991	November 19, 1992										
Canada Deposit Insurance Corp. v. Canadian Commercial Bank, [1992] 3 SCR 558	April 2, 1992	November 19, 1992										
R. v. Mellenthin, [1992] 3 SCR 615	May 29, 1992	November 19, 1992										
Idziak v. Canada (Minister of Justice), [1992] 3 SCR 631	May 25, 1992	November 19, 1992										
R. v. Pearson, [1992] 3 SCR 665	May 28, 1992	November 19, 1992										
R. v. Morales, [1992] 3 SCR 711	May 28, 1992	November 19, 1992										
R. v. Kearney, [1992] 3 SCR 807	December 1, 1992	December 1, 1992										
Case name	Argued	Decided	Lamer	La Forest	L'Heureux-Dubé	Sopinka	Gonthier	Cory	McLachlin	Stevenson	Iacobucci	Major
R. v. Sawyer, [1992] 3 SCR 809	December 2, 1992	December 2, 1992										
R. v. W. (B. A.), [1992] 3 SCR 811	December 4, 1992	December 4, 1992										
Moge v. Moge, [1992] 3 SCR 813	April 1, 1992	December 17, 1992										
