= 2011 reasons of the Supreme Court of Canada =

The table below lists the decisions (known as reasons) delivered from the bench by the Supreme Court of Canada during 2011. The table illustrates what reasons were filed by each justice in each case, and which justices joined each reason. This list, however, does not include reasons on motions.

== Reasons ==
Delivered the Court's reason
Joined the Court's reason
Filed a concurrence
Joined a concurrence
Filed a dissent
Joined a dissent
Filed a concurrence/dissent
Joined a concurrence/dissent
Did not participate in the judgment
Did not participate in the final disposition of the judgment
Not a member of the Court at the time of hearing or delivering
- Decisions that do not note a Justice delivering the Court's reason are per coram.
- Multiple concurrences and dissents within a case are numbered, with joining votes numbered accordingly. Justices occasionally join multiple reasons in a single case; each vote is subdivided accordingly.
- Multiple unnumbered reasons are jointly written or delivered.
- Decisions that are given orally from the bench are denoted by a "V"; per coram decisions delivered orally from the bench only note a "V" on the most senior justice on the panel.
- An asterisk ( * ) in the Court's opinion denotes that it was only a majority in part or a plurality.

Case name	Argued	Decided	McLachlin	Binnie	LeBel	Deschamps	Fish	Abella	Charron	Rothstein	Cromwell	Moldaver	Karakatsanis
Celgene Corp v Canada (AG), 2011 SCC 1, [2011] 1 SCR 3	November 10, 2010	January 20, 2011
Canadian Broadcasting Corp v Canada (AG), 2011 SCC 2, [2011] 1 SCR 19	March 16, 2010	January 28, 2011
Canadian Broadcasting Corp v The Queen, 2011 SCC 3, [2011] 1 SCR 65	March 16, 2010	January 28, 2011
R v Bruce, 2011 SCC 4, [2011] 1 SCR 76	January 19, 2011	February 2, 2011
R v Caron, 2011 SCC 5, [2011] 1 SCR 78	April 13, 2010	February 4, 2011
R v Ahmad, 2011 SCC 6, [2011] 1 SCR 110	March 18, 2010	February 10, 2011
Smith v Alliance Pipeline Ltd, 2011 SCC 7, [2011] 1 SCR 160	October 5, 2010	February 11, 2011
R v Miljevic, 2011 SCC 8, [2011] 1 SCR 203	December 17, 2010	February 16, 2011
Bou Malhab v Diffusion Métromédia CMR inc, 2011 SCC 9, [2011] 1 SCR 214	December 15, 2009	February 17, 2011
Kerr v Baranow, 2011 SCC 10, [2011] 1 SCR 269	April 21, 2010	February 18, 2011
Case name	Argued	Decided	McLachlin	Binnie	LeBel	Deschamps	Fish	Abella	Charron	Rothstein	Cromwell	Moldaver	Karakatsanis
Québec (AG) v Canada, 2011 SCC 11, [2011] 1 SCR 368	October 14, 2010	March 3, 2011
Withler v Canada (AG), 2011 SCC 12, [2011] 1 SCR 369	March 17, 2010	March 4, 2011
R v White, 2011 SCC 13, [2011] 1 SCR 433	May 14, 2010	March 11, 2011
R v SD, 2011 SCC 14, [2011] 1 SCR 527	March 17, 2011	March 21, 2011		V
Seidel v TELUS Communications Inc, 2011 SCC 15, [2011] 1 SCR 531	May 12, 2010	March 18, 2011
R v St-Onge, 2011 SCC 16, [2011] 1 SCR 625	March 24, 2011	April 1, 2011
R v JAA, 2011 SCC 17, [2011] 1 SCR 628	February 22, 2011	April 8, 2011
British Columbia (AG) v Malik, 2011 SCC 18, [2011] 1 SCR 657	October 15, 2011	April 21, 2011
R v Reynolds, 2011 SCC 19, [2011] 1 SCR 693	April 19, 2011	April 28, 2011
Ontario (AG) v Fraser, 2011 SCC 20, [2011] 2 SCR 3	December 17, 2009	April 29, 2011				2			1	1
Case name	Argued	Decided	McLachlin	Binnie	LeBel	Deschamps	Fish	Abella	Charron	Rothstein	Cromwell	Moldaver	Karakatsanis
R v Loewen, 2011 SCC 21, [2011] 2 SCR 167	April 12, 2011	May 5, 2011
R v VY, 2011 SCC 22, [2011] 2 SCR 173	April 21, 2011	May 6, 2011
Sharbern Holding Inc v Vancouver Airport Centre Ltd, 2011 SCC 23, [2011] 2 SCR 175	October 6, 2010	May 11, 2011
Alberta v Elder Advocates of Alberta Society, 2011 SCC 24, [2011] 2 SCR 261	January 27, 2011	May 12, 2011
Canada (Information Commissioner) v Canada (Minister of National Defence), 2011 SCC 25, [2011] 2 SCR 306	October 7, 2010	May 13, 2011
i Trade Finance Inc v Bank of Montreal, 2011 SCC 26, [2011] 2 SCR 360	November 4, 2010	May 20, 2011
Masterpiece Inc v Alavida Lifestyles Inc, 2011 SCC 27, [2011] 2 SCR 387	December 8, 2010	May 26, 2011
R v JA, 2011 SCC 28, [2011] 2 SCR 440	November 8, 2010	May 27, 2011
R v O'Brien, 2011 SCC 29, [2011] 2 SCR 485	February 23, 2011	June 9, 2011
Canada (AG) v Mavi, 2011 SCC 30, [2011] 2 SCR 504	December 9, 2010	June 10, 2011
Case name	Argued	Decided	McLachlin	Binnie	LeBel	Deschamps	Fish	Abella	Charron	Rothstein	Cromwell	Moldaver	Karakatsanis
R v EMW, 2011 SCC 31, [2011] 2 SCR 542	May 20, 2011	June 17, 2011
R v Campbell, 2011 SCC 31, [2011] 2 SCR 549	May 11, 2011	June 23, 2011
R v Nixon, 2011 SCC 34, [2011] 2 SCR 566	December 15, 2010	June 24, 2011
Schreyer v Schreyer, 2011 SCC 35, [2011] 2 SCR 605	November 9, 2010	July 14, 2011
Canada Trustco Mortgage Co v Canada, 2011 SCC 36, [2011] 2 SCR 635	December 10, 2010	July 15, 2011
Alberta (Aboriginal Affairs and Northern Development) v Cunningham, 2011 SCC 37, [2011] 2 SCR 670	December 16, 2010	July 21, 2011
Bastien Estate v Canada, 2011 SCC 38, [2011] 2 SCR 710	May 20, 2010	July 22, 2011
Dubé v Canada, 2011 SCC 39, [2011] 2 SCR 764	May 20, 2010	July 22, 2011
R v Sinclair, 2011 SCC 40, [2011] 3 SCR 3	December 14, 2010	July 28, 2011						1	2
R v Imperial Tobacco Canada Ltd, 2011 SCC 42, [2011] 3 SCR 45	February 24, 2011	July 29, 2011
Case name	Argued	Decided	McLachlin	Binnie	LeBel	Deschamps	Fish	Abella	Charron	Rothstein	Cromwell	Moldaver	Karakatsanis
R v Topp, 2011 SCC 43, [2011] 3 SCR 119	March 23, 2011	September 23, 2011
Canada (AG) v PHS Community Services Society, 2011 SCC 44, [2011] 3 SCR 134	May 12, 2011	September 30, 2011
R v JMH, 2011 SCC 45, [2011] 3 SCR 197	May 19, 2011	October 6, 2011
R v Côté, 2011 SCC 46, [2011] 3 SCR 215	March 15, 2011	October 14, 2011
Crookes v Newton, 2011 SCC 47, [2011] 3 SCR 269	December 7, 2010	October 19, 2011
R v Katigbak, 2011 SCC 48,	February 21, 2011	October 20, 2011
R v Whyte, 2011 SCC 49,	October 20, 2011	October 20, 2011				V
R v Dorfer, 2011 SCC 50,	October 21, 2011	October 21, 2011	V
R v Barros, 2011 SCC 51,	January 25, 2011	October 26, 2011					1				2
British Columbia (Workers' Compensation Board) v Figliola, 2011 SCC 52,	March 16, 2011	October 27, 2011
Case name	Argued	Decided	McLachlin	Binnie	LeBel	Deschamps	Fish	Abella	Charron	Rothstein	Cromwell	Moldaver	Karakatsanis
Canada (Canadian Human Rights Commission) v Canada (AG), 2011 SCC 53,	December 13, 2010	October 28, 2011
R v Sarrazin, 2011 SCC 54,	April 18, 2011	November 4, 2011
R v Banwait, 2011 SCC 55,	November 8, 2011	November 8, 2011	V
Lax Kw'alaams Indian Band v Canada (AG), 2011 SCC 56,	February 17, 2011	November 10, 2011
Public Service Alliance of Canada v Canada Post Corp, 2011 SCC 57,	November 17, 2011	November 17, 2011	V
R v Bouchard-Lebrun, 2011 SCC 58,	May 16, 2011	November 30, 2011
Nor-man Regional Health Authority Inc v Manitoba Association of Health Care Professionals, 2011 SCC 59,	October 20, 2011	December 2, 2011
Quebec (AG) v Canada (Human Resources and Social Development), 2011 SCC 60,	February 15, 2011	December 8, 2011
Alberta (Information and Privacy Commissioner) vv Alberta Teachers' Association, 2011 SCC 61,	February 16, 2011	December 14, 2011		1		1					2
Newfoundland and Labrador Nurses' Union v Newfoundland and Labrador (Treasury Board), 2011 SCC 62,	October 14, 2011	December 15, 2011
Case name	Argued	Decided	McLachlin	Binnie	LeBel	Deschamps	Fish	Abella	Charron	Rothstein	Cromwell	Moldaver	Karakatsanis
Copthorne Holdings Ltd v Canada, 2011 SCC 63,	January 21, 2011	December 16, 2011
LMP v LS, 2011 SCC 64,	April 20, 2011	December 21, 2011
RP v RC, 2011 SCC 65,	April 20, 2011	December 21, 2011
Reference re Securities Act, 2011 SCC 66,	April 13, 2011	December 22, 2011
Case name	Argued	Decided	McLachlin	Binnie	LeBel	Deschamps	Fish	Abella	Charron	Rothstein	Cromwell	Moldaver	Karakatsanis

== 2011 Statistics ==
Justice	Reasons written	% Majority
Chief Justice Beverley McLachlin	12 / 1 / 0 / 1 / Total=14	54 of 59 (91.5%)
Puisne Justice Ian Binnie	8 / 1 / 0 / 2 / Total=11	49 of 54 (90.7%)
Puisne Justice Louis LeBel	7 / 2 / 0 / 2 / Total=11	52 of 56 (92.9%)
Puisne Justice Marie Deschamps	7 / 1 / 2 / 4 / Total=14	51 of 60 (85%)
Puisne Justice Morris Fish	4 / 1 / 1 / 6 / Total=12	46 of 57 (80.7%)
Pusine Justice Rosalie Abella	8 / 1 / 1 / 2 / Total=12	51 of 56 (91.1%)
Puisne Justice Louise Charron	5 / 1 / 1 / 0 / Total=7	53 of 56 (94.6%)
Pusine Justice Marshall Rothstein	7 / 0 / 1 / 1 / Total=9	58 of 63 (92.1%)
Pusine Justice Thomas Cromwell	7 / 3 / 2 / 1 / Total=13	57 of 61 (93.4%)
Pusine Justice Michael Moldaver	0 / 0 / 0 / 0 / Total=0	2 of 2 (100%)
Pusine Justice Andromache Karakatsanis	0 / 0 / 0 / 0 / Total=0	2 of 2 (100%)
Notes on statistics: A justice is only included in the majority if they have joined or concurred in the Court's judgment in full. Percentages are based only on the cases in which a justice participated, and are rounded to the nearest decimal.
