= 2021 reasons of the Supreme Court of Canada =

List of reasons

The table below lists the decisions (known as reasons) delivered from the bench by the Supreme Court of Canada during 2021. The table illustrates what reasons were filed by each justice in each case, and which justices joined each reason.

== Reasons ==
Delivered the Court's reason
Joined the Court's reason
Filed a concurrence
Joined a concurrence
Filed a dissent
Joined a dissent
Filed a concurrence/dissent
Joined a concurrence/dissent
Did not participate in the judgment
Did not participate in the final disposition of the judgment
Not a member of the Court at the time of hearing or delivering
- Decisions that do not note a Justice delivering the Court's reason are per coram.
- Multiple concurrences and dissents within a case are numbered, with joining votes numbered accordingly. Justices occasionally join multiple reasons in a single case; each vote is subdivided accordingly.
- Multiple unnumbered reasons are jointly written or delivered.
- Decisions that are given orally from the bench are denoted by a "V"; per coram decisions delivered orally from the bench only note a "V" on the most senior justice on the panel.
- An asterisk ( * ) in the Court's opinion denotes that it was only a majority in part or a plurality.

Case name	Argued	Decided	Wagner	Abella (Note: Retired on 1 July 2021)	Moldaver	Karakatsanis	Côté	Brown	Rowe	Martin	Kasirer	Jamal (Note: Appointed on 1 July 2021)
Armstrong v Ward, 2021 SCC 1	January 18, 2021	January 18, 2021	V
R v Yusuf, 2021 SCC 2	January 19, 2021	January 19, 2021			V
R v Deslauriers, 2021 SCC 3	January 20, 2021	January 20, 2021	V
R v Murtaza, 2021 SCC 4	January 21, 2021	January 21, 2021	V
R v Waterman, 2021 SCC 5	January 22, 2021	January 22, 2021			V
R v T.J.M., 2021 SCC 6	November 9, 2020	January 29, 2021
Wastech Services Ltd. v Greater Vancouver Sewerage and Drainage District, 2021 SCC 7	December 6, 2019	February 5, 2021
R v W.O., 2021 SCC 8	February 19, 2021	February 19, 2021					V
R v R.V., 2021 SCC 10	November 13, 2020	March 12, 2021
Reference re Greenhouse Gas Pollution Pricing Act, 2021 SCC 11	September 22 and 23, 2020	March 25, 2021						1	2
Case name	Argued	Decided	Wagner	Abella	Moldaver	Karakatsanis	Côté	Brown	Rowe	Martin	Kasirer	Jamal
R v Ghotra, 2021 SCC 12	April 13, 2021	April 13, 2021	V
R v Sheikh, 2021 SCC 13	April 16, 2021	April 16, 2021	V
R v Gul, 2021 SCC 14	April 19, 2021	April 19, 2021	V						V
R v Ramos, 2021 SCC 15	April 21, 2021	April 21, 2021	V
R v Smith, 2021 SCC 16	April 22, 2021	April 22, 2021						V
''R v Desautel'', 2021 SCC 17	October 8, 2020	April 23, 2021			1		2
Ontario (Attorney General) v Clark, 2021 SCC 18	October 15, 2020	April 30, 2021
R v C.P., 2021 SCC 19	November 10, 2020	May 7, 2021	1	*	1			1	1		2
R v G.F., 2021 SCC 20	October 14, 2020	May 14, 2021
R v Morrow, 2021 SCC 21	May 19, 2021	May 19, 2021			V		V
Case name	Argued	Decided	Wagner	Abella	Moldaver	Karakatsanis	Côté	Brown	Rowe	Martin	Kasirer	Jamal
Ethiopian Orthodox Tewahedo Church of Canada St. Mary Cathedral v Aga, 2021 SCC 22	December 9, 2020	May 21, 2021
MediaQMI Inc. v Kamel, 2021 SCC 23	November 12, 2020	May 28, 2021
Colucci v Colucci, 2021 SCC 24	November 4, 2020	June 4, 2021
Sherman (Estate) v Donovan, 2021 SCC 25	October 6, 2020	June 11, 2021
Reference re Code of Civil Procedure (Que.), art. 35, 2021 SCC 27	September 24, 2020	June 30, 2021
Southwind v Canada, 2021 SCC 28	December 8, 2020	July 16, 2021
Corner Brook (City) v Bailey, 2021 SCC 29	March 23, 2021	July 23, 2021
Canada v Canada North Group Inc., 2021 SCC 30	December 1, 2020	July 28, 2021		1	2		*	1	1
Grant Thornton LLP v New Brunswick, 2021 SCC 31	March 24, 2021	July 29, 2021
York University v Canadian Copyright Licensing Agency (Access Copyright), 2021 SCC 32	May 21, 2021	July 30, 2021
Case name	Argued	Decided	Wagner	Abella	Moldaver	Karakatsanis	Côté	Brown	Rowe	Martin	Kasirer	Jamal
Canadian Broadcasting Corp. v Manitoba, 2021 SCC 33	March 17, 2021	September 24, 2021
Toronto (City) v Ontario (Attorney General), 2021 SCC 34	March 16, 2021	October 1, 2021
R v Dingwall, 2021 SCC 35	October 8, 2021	October 8, 2021							V
Richardson v Richardson, 2021 SCC 36	October 13, 2021	October 13, 2021									V
R v Khill, 2021 SCC 37	February 14, 2021	October 14, 2021
R v Reilly, 2021 SCC 38	October 14, 2021	October 14, 2021			V
6362222 Canada inc. v Prelco inc., 2021 SCC 39	December 3, 2020	October 15, 2021
R v Strathdee, 2021 SCC 40	October 15, 2021	October 15, 2021							V
Nelson (City) v Marchi, 2021 SCC 41	March 25, 2021	October 21, 2021
Northern Regional Health Authority v Horrocks, 2021 SCC 42	April 15, 2021	October 22, 2021
Case name	Argued	Decided	Wagner	Abella	Moldaver	Karakatsanis	Côté	Brown	Rowe	Martin	Kasirer	Jamal
Ward v. Quebec (Commission des droits de la personne et des droits de la jeunesse), 2021 SCC 43	February 15, 2021	October 29, 2021
H.M.B. Holdings Limited v Antigua and Barbuda, 2021 SCC 44	April 20, 2021	November 4, 2021
R v Cowan, 2021 SCC 45	May 12, 2021	November 5, 2021
R v J.D.	November 10, 2021	November 10, 2021
R v Parranto, 2021 SCC 46	May 18, 2021	November 12, 2021			1		1	*	2	*
Trial Lawyers Association of British Columbia v Royal & Sun Alliance Insurance Company of Canada, 2021 SCC 47	May 17, 2021	November 18, 2021
R v Albashir, 2021 SCC 48	May 14, 2021	November 19, 2021
Canada v. Alta Energy Luxembourg S.A.R.L., 2021 SCC 49	March 19, 2021	November 26, 2021
Barendregt v Grebliunas	December 2, 2021	December 2, 2021
Kreke v Alansari, 2021 SCC 50	December 2, 2021	December 2, 2021	V
Case name	Argued	Decided	Wagner	Abella	Moldaver	Karakatsanis	Côté	Brown	Rowe	Martin	Kasirer	Jamal
B.J.T. v J.D.	December 2, 2021	December 2, 2021
Canada v. Loblaw Financial Holdings Inc., 2021 SCC 51	May 13, 2021	December 3, 2021
R v Goforth	December 7, 2021	December 7, 2021
R v Lai, 2021 SCC 52	December 8, 2021	December 8, 2021			V
Montréal (City) v Deloitte Restructuring Inc., 2021 SCC 53	May 20, 2021	December 10, 2021
Association de médiation familiale du Québec v Bouvier, 2021 SCC 54	March 18, 2021	December 17, 2021
Case name	Argued	Decided	Wagner	Abella	Moldaver	Karakatsanis	Côté	Brown	Rowe	Martin	Kasirer	Jamal
