= 2026 judgments of the Supreme Court of Canada =

Supreme Court of Canada Cour suprême du Canada
- Established: April 8, 1875
- Jurisdiction: General court of appeal for Canada
- Motto: Justitia et Veritas
- Authorized by: Supreme Court Act, RSC 1985, c. S-26
- Appeals from: Federal and provincial courts of appeal
- Judge term length: Retirement at age 75
- Number of positions: Nine
- Language: English and French
- Website: Supreme Court of Canada

The table below lists the judgments delivered by the Supreme Court of Canada during 2026. The judgments are listed in chronological order, starting with the first judgment rendered on January 22, 2026, and will continue until the last judgment in 2026, which will likely be rendered in December. The table gives a general illustration of the positions taken by each justice on each case, and how justices concurred or dissented with the decisions of the majority.

The Supreme Court normally reserves its judgment after hearing argument on an appeal, and then gives its judgment at some later date by depositing the judgment and reasons with the Registrar of the Supreme Court. On average, judgments in reserved cases are given within six months of the hearing date. In some cases, the court may give its judgment from the bench at the conclusion of the hearing, with a short outline of its reasons. Those judgments are indicated in the table. The court may also give its judgment from the bench at the conclusion of the hearing, reasons to follow at a later date. Those judgments are included on the date reasons are given, which may be in a subsequent year.

This table includes cases which were argued in a previous year and reserved, with the judgment given in 2026. Cases which were heard in 2026 and reserved, with judgment in a later year, will be included in the article for the later year.

There have been two changes in the membership of the court so far in 2026:

- Justice Martin resigned on May 30, 2026;
- Glenn Joyal, Chief Justice of the Court of King's Bench of Manitoba, was appointed to succeed Justice Martin, effective July 15, 2026.

The Supreme Court Act authorises a retired judge to participate in appeals they heard prior to their retirement and which are on reserve, for up to six months. Martin is doing so, starting with R v Berg on June 5, 2026.

== Judgments ==
By the Court (C)
Unanimous reasons for judgment (U)
Concurred in the unanimous reasons (C–U)
Majority reasons for judgment (M)
Concurred in the majority (C–M)
Concurring reasons (C–R)
Concurred in the concurring reasons (C–C)
Plurality reasons (P)
Concurred in the plurality reasons (C–P)
Dissenting reasons (D)
Concurred in the dissent (C–D)
Dissenting in part (D–P)
Concurred in the partial dissent (C–DP)
Seriatim reasons (S)
Concurred in seriatim reasons (C–S)
Motion (Mo)
Did not sit on the appeal (NS)
Did not participate in the judgment (NP)
Not a Justice of the Court at the time of hearing or judgment (NJ)
- "Decision by the Court" means that it is a unanimous judgment of the Court, not attributed to any particular justice.
- "Unanimous reasons for judgment" indicated a unanimous decision, written by a particular justice.
- Multiple concurrences and dissents within a case are numbered, with concurrences by other numbered accordingly. Justices occasionally concur in multiple reasons in a single case; each concurrence is subdivided accordingly.
- Reasons are sometimes drafted jointly by two or more justices.
- Decisions that are given orally from the bench are denoted by "Bench" on the justice who gave the oral decision.

| Case name | Argued | Decided | Wagner | Karakatsanis | Côté | Rowe | Martin | Kasirer | Jamal | O'Bonsawin | Moreau |
| R. v. B.B., 2026 SCC 1 | Jan 22, 2026 | Jan 22, 2026 | Bench; U | C–U | C–U | NS | NS | NS | NS | C–U | C–U |
| R. v. Hussein, 2026 SCC 2 | Jan 23, 2025 | Jan 23, 2026 | M | C–M | C–M | C–C | C–M | C–M | C–R | C–M | C–M |
| Emond v. Trillium Mutual Insurance Co., 2026 SCC 3 | Mar 18, 2025 | Jan 30, 2026 | C-M | D–P; 1 | D–P; 2 | M | C-M | C-M | C-M | C-M | C-M |
| R. v. Fox, 2026 SCC 4 | May 20, 2025 | Feb 6, 2026 | C-M | C-M | C-M | C–D | C-M | C-M | M | D | C-M |
| Taylor v. Newfoundland and Labrador, 2026 SCC 5 | Apr 15, 16, 2025 | Feb 13, 2026 | C–DP; 1 | M Joint | C–M | D–P; 2 | M Joint | D–P; Joint; 1 | D–P; Joint; 1 | C–M | C–M |
| R. v. Case, 2026 SCC 6 | Feb 19, 2026 | Feb 19, 2026 | Bench; U | C–U | C–U | C–U | C–U | C–U | NS | NS | C–U |
| Quebec (Attorney General) v. Kanyinda, 2026 SCC 7 | May 14, 15, 2025 | Mar 6, 2026 | C–R; 1 | M | D | C–R; 2 | C–M | C–M | C–M | C–M | C–M |
| R. v. Singer, 2026 SCC 8 | Feb 18, 2025 | Mar 20, 2026 | C–M | C–D; 1 | C–M | C–M | D 2 | C–M | M | D Joint; 1 | D Joint; 1 |
| Riddle v. ivari, 2026 SCC 9 | Oct 10, 2025 | Apr 10, 2026 | U | C–U | C–U | C–U | C–U | C–U | C–U | C–U | C–U |
| R. v. Nguyen, 2026 SCC 10 | Oct 16, 2025 | Apr 17, 2026 | C–U | C–U | C–U | C–U | C–U | U | C–U | C–U | C–U |
| Case name | Argued | Decided | Wagner | Karakatsanis | Côté | Rowe | Martin | Kasirer | Jamal | O'Bonsawin | Moreau |
| R. v. Maadani, 2026 SCC 11 | Apr 17, 2026 | Apr 17, 2026 | Bench; M | D Joint | D Joint | C–M | NS | C–M | C–M | C–M | NS |
| R. v. G.G., 2026 SCC 12 | Mar 20, 2026 | Apr 24, 2026 | C | C | C | C | C | C | C | C | C |
| Quebec (Attorney General) v. Lalande, 2026 SCC 13 | Apr 22, 2026 (Note: Hearing and judgment April 22, 2026; reasons for judgment, May 1, 2026.) | May 1, 2026 | C–M | C–M | D Joint | D Joint | C–M | M | C–M | C–M | C–M |
| Alford v. Canada (Attorney General), 2026 SCC 14 | Nov 5, 6, 2025 | May 1, 2026 | C–M | C–M | D | M | C–M | C–M | C–M | C–M | C–M |
| Patrick Street Holdings Ltd. v. 11368 NL Inc., 2026 SCC 15 | Oct 15, 2025 | May 8, 2026 | M | C–D; 1 | D 2 | C–M | D 1 | C–M | C–M | C–M | C–M |
| Ahluwalia v. Ahluwalia, 2026 SCC 16 | Feb 11, 12, 2025 | May 15, 2026 | C–M | C–R | C–D | C–D | C–M | M | D | C–M | C–M |
| R. v. Whitehawk, 2026 SCC 17 | May 22, 2026 | May 22, 2026 | Bench; U | C–U | C–U | C–U | C–U | C–U | C–U | C–U | C–U |
| R. v. Saddleback, 2026 SCC 18 | Nov 12, 2025 | May 22, 2026 | C–M | C–M | D | C–M | C–M | C–M | C–M | M | C–M |
| R. v. Vrbanic, 2026 SCC 19 | Dec 4, 2025 | May 29, 2026 | M | C–M | C–M | C–R | C–M | C–M | C–M | C–M | C–M |
| R. v. Jacques-Taylor, 2026 SCC 20 | Nov 7, 2025 | May 29, 2026 | C–M | D | M | C–M | C–D | C–M | C–M | C–M | C–D |
| Case name | Argued | Decided | Wagner | Karakatsanis | Côté | Rowe | Martin (Note: Martin resigned on May 30, 2026.) | Kasirer | Jamal | O'Bonsawin | Moreau |
| R. v. Berg, 2026 SCC 21 (Note: Justice Martin resigned from the Court on May 30, 2026. As permitted by the Supreme Court Act, she continued to participate in judgments for cases she heard before her resignation.) | Apr 14, 2026 (Note: Hearing and judgment April 14, 2026; reasons for judgment June 5, 2026.) | Jun 5, 2026 | C | C | C | C | C | C | C | C | C |
| Société de l’Acadie du Nouveau-Brunswick v. Canada (Prime Minister), 2026 SCC 22 | Nov 13, 2025 | Jun 12, 2026 | M | C–D | C–M | D | C–M | C–M | C–D | C–M | C–M |
| Resler v. Anglin, 2026 SCC 23 | Oct 14, 2025 | Jun 19, 2026 | C–DP | D–P | C–C | C–R | C–DP | C–M | C–M | C–M | M |
| Edmonton (Police Service) v. McKee, 2026 SCC 24 | Oct 7, 8, 2025 | Jun 26, 2026 | C–U | C–U | C–U | C–U | U | C–U | C–U | NS | NS |
| Quebec (Attorney General) v. Denis, 2026 SCC 25 | Jan 13, 2026 | Jul 10, 2026 | C–M | D | M Joint | C–M | C–M | C–M | C–M | M Joint | C–D |
| Pharmascience Inc. v. Janssen Inc., 2026 SCC 26 | Oct 9, 2025 | Jul 17, 2026 | C–M | C–M | C–M | C–M | C–M | C–M | M | C–R; Joint | C–R; Joint |
| Zardev Inc. v. Dydzak, 2026 SCC 27 | Nov 10, 2025 | Jul 23, 2026 | C-M | C-M | D | C–M | C-M | M | C-M | C-M | C-M |
| Democracy Watch v. Attorney General of Canada, 2026 SCC 28 | Jan 15, 2026 | Jul 30, 2026 | U | C–U | C–U | C–U | C–U | C–U | C–U | C–U | C–U |
| SS&C Technologies Canada Corp. v. Bank of New York Mellon Corp., 2026 SCC 29 | Dec 10, 2025 | Jul 31, 2026 | C-U | C-U | U Joint | C–U | C-U | C-U | C-U | C-U | U Joint |
| R. v. R.B.-C., 2026 SCC 30 | Jan 16, 2026 | Sep 11, 2026 | C–U | C–U | C–U | C–U | U | C–U | C–U | C–U | C–U |
| Case name | Argued | Decided | Wagner | Karakatsanis | Côté | Rowe | Martin | Kasirer | Jamal | O'Bonsawin | Moreau |
| Sinclair-Desgagné v. Canada (Chief Electoral Officer), 2026 SCC 31 | Feb 13, 2026 (Note: Hearing and judgment, February 13, 2026; reasons for judgment, September 18, 2026) | Feb 13, 2026; Sep 18, 2026 | C–M | D Joint | C–M | C–M | D Joint | C–M | M | C–M | C–D |
| R. v. Cope, 2026 SCC 32 | Dec 11, 12, 2025 | Oct 9, 2026 | C-D | C-M | C-D | D Joint | C-M | C-M | D Joint | M | C-M |
| R. v. A.M., 2026 SCC 33 | Feb 11, 2026 | Oct 16, 2026 | C-U | C-U | C-U | C–U | C-U | C-U | C-U | C-U | U |
| Hemmings v. Padmore, 2026 SCC 34 | Feb 10, 2026 | Oct 23, 2026 | D-P; 1 | C-DP; 2 | NS | P Joint | D-P; 2 | NS | C-P | P Joint | C-DP; 2 |
| R. v. Moshfeghi Zadeh, 2026 SCC 35 | Apr 15, 2026 | Oct 30, 2026 | C-D | C-D | D | C–M | C-M | C-D | C-M | M | C-M |
| Case name | Argued | Decided | Wagner | Karakatsanis | Côté | Rowe | Martin | Kasirer | Jamal | O'Bonsawin | Moreau | Joyal (Note: Joyal was appointed July 15, 2026.) |
| R. v. Dubé, 2026 SCC 36 | Nov 2, 2026 | Nov 2, 2026 | Bench; M | C-M | D | NS | NJ | C-M | NS | C-M | NS | NS |
| Quebec (Attorney General) v. SGS Canada inc., 2026 SCC 37 | Dec 2, 2025 | Nov 6, 2026 | C-D | M | C-D | C-M | C-M | D | C-M | C-D | C-M | NJ |
| R. v. Lafferty, 2026 SCC 38 | Nov 12, 2026 | Nov 12, 2026 | Bench; U | NS | NS | C-U | NJ | C-U | NS | C-U | C-U | NS |
| R. v. Degale, 2026 SCC 39 | May 21, 2026 | Nov 20, 2026 | M Joint | C-C | C-M | C–M | C-R | C-C | C-M | C-C | M Joint | NJ |
| R. v. Bilinski, 2026 SCC 40 | May 22, 2026 | Nov 20, 2026 | C-M | C-M | D | C–D | M | C-M | C-M | C-M | C-M | NJ |

== See also ==
Lists of Supreme Court of Canada cases
