= R v Noble =

- Supreme Court of Canada

Hearing: October 29, 1996 Judgment: April 24, 1997
- Full case name: Her Majesty The Queen v Sean Jeffrey Noble
- Citations: [1997] 1 S.C.R. 874
- Docket No.: 25271
- Ruling: Appeal dismissed

Court membership
- Chief Justice: Antonio Lamer; Puisne Justices: Gérard La Forest, Claire L'Heureux-Dubé, John Sopinka, Charles Gonthier, Peter Cory, Beverley McLachlin, Frank Iacobucci, John C. Major

Reasons given
- Majority: Sopinka J., joined by L’Heureux‑Dubé, Cory, Iacobucci and Major JJ.
- Dissent: Lamer C.J., joined by Gonthier J.
- Dissent: La Forest J.
- Dissent: McLachlin J.

R v Noble, [1997] 1 S.C.R. 874 is a leading decision of the Supreme Court of Canada on the right to silence under section 11(c) of the Canadian Charter of Rights and Freedoms. The court held that the silence of an accused cannot be given any independent weight.

== Background ==
A building manager found two young men, one named Sean Jeffrey Noble, in the building's parking lot. One was attempting to break into a car using a screwdriver. He asked for identification from Noble, who provided his driver's licence. The manager held onto the licence and called the police.

At trial, neither the manager nor anyone else could identify Noble. The trial judge ruled that as the trier of fact he could look at the licence given to the manager and see that it was the accused in the picture on the licence. He also ruled that the manager would have looked carefully at the licence at the time of the alleged crime. He noted that the driver's licence made a much tougher case to meet by the accused, yet the accused remained silent. The judge drew a negative inference from this silence and said it could add strength to the Crown's case. Noble was convicted, but his conviction was set aside on appeal. The Crown then appealed to the Supreme Court.

== Ruling of the Court ==
Justice Sopinka, writing for the majority, dismissed the Crown's appeal. He held that there can be no independent weight given to an accused's silence, that the accused's silence is equal to his right against self-incrimination, and that giving weight to an accused's silence violates the right to silence and the presumption of innocence under the Charter.

== See also ==
- List of Supreme Court of Canada cases
