= 2008 reasons of the Supreme Court of Canada =

The table below lists the decisions (known as reasons) delivered from the bench by the Supreme Court of Canada during 2008. The table illustrates what reasons were filed by each justice in each case, and which justices joined each reason. This list, however, does not include reasons on motions.

== Reasons ==
Delivered the Court's reason
Joined the Court's reason
Filed a concurrence
Joined a concurrence
Filed a dissent
Joined a dissent
Filed a concurrence/dissent
Joined a concurrence/dissent
Did not participate in the judgment
Did not participate in the final disposition of the judgment
Not a member of the Court at the time of hearing or delivering
- Decisions that do not note a Justice delivering the Court's reason are per coram.
- Multiple concurrences and dissents within a case are numbered, with joining votes numbered accordingly. Justices occasionally join multiple reasons in a single case; each vote is subdivided accordingly.
- Multiple unnumbered reasons are jointly written or delivered.
- Decisions that are given orally from the bench are denoted by a "V"; per coram decisions delivered orally from the bench only note a "V" on the most senior justice on the panel.
- An asterisk ( * ) in the Court's opinion denotes that it was only a majority in part or a plurality.

Case name	Argued	Decided	McLachlin	Bastarache	Binnie	LeBel	Deschamps	Fish	Abella	Charron	Rothstein
R v Beaulieu, [2008] 1 S.C.R. 3; 2008 SCC 1		January 25, 2008				V
R v CLY, [2008] 1 S.C.R. 5; 2008 SCC 2	November 6, 2007	January 24, 2008
British Columbia (AG) v Insurance Co of British Columbia, [2008] 1 S.C.R. 21; 2008 SCC 3	December 12, 2007	February 7, 2008
British Columbia v Zastowny, [2008] 1 S.C.R. 27; 2008 SCC 4	December 14, 2007	February 8, 2008
R v Beatty, [2008] 1 S.C.R. 49; 2008 SCC 5	October 19, 2007	February 22, 2008	1		1	1		2
R v Ferguson, [2008] 1 S.C.R. 96, 2008 SCC 6	November 13, 2007	February 29, 2008
620 Connaught Ltd v Canada (AG), [2008] 1 S.C.R. 131; 2008 SCC 7	November 16, 2007	February 29, 2008
Juman v Doucette, [2008] 1 S.C.R. 157; 2008 SCC 8	November 15, 2007	March 6, 2008
Dunsmuir v New Brunswick, [2008] 1 S.C.R. 190; 2008 SCC 9	May 15, 2007	March 7, 2008			1		2			2	2
R v Stirling, [2008] 1 S.C.R. 272; 2008 SCC 10	December 10, 2007	March 14, 2008
Case name	Argued	Decided	McLachlin	Bastarache	Binnie	LeBel	Deschamps	Fish	Abella	Charron	Rothstein
R v McIvor, [2008] 1 S.C.R. 285, 2008 SCC 11	November 8, 2007	March 20, 2008
Tele‑Mobile Co v Ontario, [2008] 1 S.C.R. 305, 2008 SCC 12	October 18, 2007	March 28, 2008
Société de l'assurance automobile du Québec v Cyr, [2008] 1 S.C.R. 338, 2008 SCC 13	October 18, 2007	March 28, 2008
Canada (AG) v Lameman, [2008] 1 S.C.R. 372, 2008 SCC 14	February 22, 2008	April 3, 2008
Société des Acadiens et Acadiennes du Nouveau‑Brunswick Inc v Canada, [2008] 1 S.C.R. 383, 2008 SCC 15	October 17, 2007	April 11, 2008
R v Gibson, [2008] 1 S.C.R. 397, 2008 SCC 16	October 15, 2007	April 17, 2008
R v Turningrobe, [2008] 1 S.C.R. 454, 2008 SCC 17		April 17, 2008	V
R v Kang-Brown, [2008] 1 S.C.R. 456, 2008 SCC 18	May 22, 2007	April 25, 2008		2			1				1
R v AM, [2008] 1 S.C.R. 569, 2008 SCC 19	May 22, 2007	April 25, 2008		2			1				1
Evans v Teamsters Local Union No 31, [2008] 1 S.C.R. 661, 2008 SCC 20	January 21, 2008	May 1, 2008
Case name	Argued	Decided	McLachlin	Bastarache	Binnie	LeBel	Deschamps	Fish	Abella	Charron	Rothstein
R v Mathieu, [2008] 1 S.C.R. 723, 2008 SCC 21	November 7, 2007	May 1, 2008
Design Services Ltd v Canada, [2008] 1 S.C.R. 737, 2008 SCC 22	November 9, 2007	May 8, 2008
Lake v Canada (Minister of Justice), [2008] 1 S.C.R. 761, 2008 SCC 23	December 6, 2007	May 8, 2008
R v Dinardo, [2008] 1 S.C.R. 788, 2008 SCC 24	January 25, 2008	May 9, 2008
R v DB, [2008] 2 S.C.R. 3, 2008 SCC 25	October 10, 2007	May 16, 2008
Canada v McLarty, [2008] 2 S.C.R. 79, 2008 SCC 26	January 25, 2008	May 22, 2008
Mustapha v Culligan of Canada Ltd, [2008] 2 S.C.R. 114, 2008 SCC 27	March 18, 2008	May 22, 2008
Canada (Justice) v Khadr, [2008] 2 S.C.R. 125, 2008 SCC 28	March 26, 2008	May 23, 2008
Canada (Justice) v Khadr, [2008] 2 S.C.R. 143, 2008 SCC 29	March 26, 2008	May 23, 2008
R v JHS, [2008] 2 S.C.R. 152, 2008 SCC 30	January 25, 2008	May 29, 2008
Case name	Argued	Decided	McLachlin	Bastarache	Binnie	LeBel	Deschamps	Fish	Abella	Charron	Rothstein
R v LM, [2008] 2 S.C.R. 163, 2008 SCC 31	November 14, 2007	May 29, 2008
Association des courtiers et agents immobiliers du Québec v Proprio Direct inc, [2008] 2 S.C.R. 195, 2008 SCC 32	November 14, 2007	May 29, 2008
R v Wittwer, [2008] 2 S.C.R. 235, 2008 SCC 33	November 14, 2007	May 29, 2008
R v Walker, [2008] 2 S.C.R. 245, 2008 SCC 34	February 26, 2008	June 6, 2008
Stein v Stein, [2008] 2 S.C.R. 263, 2008 SCC 35	February 1, 2008	June 12, 2008
R v Devine, [2008] 2 S.C.R. 283, 2008 SCC 36	February 26, 2008	June 19, 2008
BCE Inc v 1976 Debentureholders, [2008] 3 S.C.R. 560, 2008 SCC 69	June 17, 2008	June 20, 2008
R v Blackman, [2008] 2 S.C.R. 298, 2008 SCC 37	December 10, 2007	June 26, 2008
Charkaoui v Canada (Citizenship and Immigration) 2008 SCC 38, [2008] 2 S.C.R. 326, 2008 SCC 38	December 10, 2007	June 26, 2008
Honda Canada Inc v Keays, [2008] 2 S.C.R. 362, 2008 SCC 39	December 10, 2007	June 26, 2008
Case name	Argued	Decided	McLachlin	Bastarache	Binnie	LeBel	Deschamps	Fish	Abella	Charron	Rothstein
WIC Radio Ltd v Simpson, [2008] 2 S.C.R. 420, 2008 SCC 40	December 4, 2007	June 27, 2008
R v Kapp, [2008] 2 S.C.R. 483, 2008 SCC 41	December 11, 2007	June 27, 2008
Holland v Saskatchewan, [2008] 2 S.C.R. 551, 2008 SCC 42	May 29, 2008	July 11, 2008
Hydro‑Québec v Syndicat des employé‑e‑s de techniques professionnelles et de bureau d'Hydro‑Québec, section locale 2000 (SCFP‑FTQ), [2008] 2 S.C.R. 561, 2008 SCC 43	January 22, 2008	July 17, 2008
Canada (Privacy Commissioner) v Blood Tribe Department of Health, [2008] 2 S.C.R. 574, 2008 SCC 44	February 21, 2008	July 11, 2008
New Brunswick (Human Rights Commission) v Potash Corp of Saskatchewan Inc, [2008] 2 S.C.R. 604, 2008 SCC 45	February 19, 2008	July 18, 2008
Redeemer Foundation v Canada (National Revenue), [2008] 2 S.C.R. 643, 2008 SCC 46	February 28, 2008	July 31, 2008
R v SAC, [2008] 2 S.C.R. 675, 2008 SCC 47	April 17, 2008	July 31, 2008
Montréal (City) v Quebec (Commission des droits de la personne et des droits de la jeunesse), [2008] 2 S.C.R. 698, 2008 SCC 48	December 5, 2007	August 1, 2008
R v LTH, [2008] 2 S.C.R. 739, 2008 SCC 49	February 25, 2008	September 11, 2008
Case name	Argued	Decided	McLachlin	Bastarache	Binnie	LeBel	Deschamps	Fish	Abella	Charron	Rothstein
MT v J‑YT, [2008] 2 S.C.R. 781, 2008 SCC 50	February 27, 2008	September 25, 2008
R v REM, [2008] 3 S.C.R. 3, 2008 SCC 51	May 16, 2008	October 2, 2008
R v HSB, [2008] 3 S.C.R. 32, 2008 SCC 52	May 16, 2008	October 2, 2008
FH v McDougall, [2008] 3 S.C.R. 41, 2008 SCC 53	May 15, 2008	October 2, 2008
R v Solowan, [2008] 3 S.C.R. 309, 2008 SCC 62		October 8, 2008
RBC Dominion Securities Inc v Merrill Lynch Canada Inc, [2008] 3 S.C.R. 79, 2008 SCC 54	April 25, 2008	October 9, 2008
R v Dowe, [2008] 3 S.C.R. 109, 2008 SCC 55		October 17, 2008	V
R v Rojas, [2008] 3 S.C.R. 111, 2008 SCC 56	April 22, 2008	October 24, 2008
R v Illes, [2008] 3 S.C.R. 134, 2008 SCC 57	April 22, 2008	October 24, 2008
Saulnier v Royal Bank of Canada, [2008] 3 S.C.R. 166, 2008 SCC 58	January 23, 2008	October 24, 2008
Case name	Argued	Decided	McLachlin	Bastarache	Binnie	LeBel	Deschamps	Fish	Abella	Charron	Rothstein
R v Pritchard, [2008] 3 S.C.R. 195, 2008 SCC 59	April 18, 2008	October 30, 2008
R v JF, [2008] 3 S.C.R. 215, 2008 SCC 60	April 18, 2008	October 31, 2008
Apotex Inc v Sanofi‑Synthelabo Canada Inc, [2008] 3 S.C.R. 265, 2008 SCC 61	April 16, 2008	November 6, 2008
R v Mahalingan, [2008] 3 S.C.R. 316, 2008 SCC 63	April 16, 2008	November 14, 2008
St. Lawrence Cement Inc v Barrette, [2008] 3 S.C.R. 392, 2008 SCC 64	March 27, 2008	November 20, 2008
R v Caissey, [2008] 3 S.C.R. 451, 2008 SCC 65		November 20, 2008	V
Canadian National Railway Co v Royal and Sun Alliance Insurance Co of Canada, [2008] 3 S.C.R. 453, 2008 SCC 66	May 14, 2008	November 21, 2008
R v Lacroix, [2008] 3 S.C.R. 509, 2008 SCC 67	November 21, 2008	December 4, 2008
Confédération des syndicats nationaux v Canada (AG), [2008] 3 S.C.R. 511, 2008 SCC 68	May 13, 2008	December 11, 2008
