= 2007 reasons of the Supreme Court of Canada =

The table below lists the reasons delivered from the bench by the Supreme Court of Canada during 2007. The table illustrates what reasons were filed by each justice in each case, and which justices joined each reason. This list, however, does not include reasons on motions.

== Reasons ==
Case name	Argued	Decided	McLachlin	Bastarache	Binnie	LeBel	Deschamps	Fish	Abella	Charron	Rothstein
Kingstreet Investments Ltd v Province of New Brunswick (Department of Finance), 2007 SCC 1	June 20, 2006	January 11, 2007		x							
Little Sisters Book and Art Emporium v Canada (Commissioner of Customs and Revenue), 2007 SCC 2	April 19, 2006	January 19, 2007									
Double N Earthmovers Ltd v Edmonton (City), 2007 SCC 3	June 16, 2006	January 25, 2007									
McGill University Health Centre (Montreal General Hospital) v Syndicat des employés de l'Hôpital général de Montréal, 2007 SCC 4	April 12, 2006	January 26, 2007									
R v Beaudry, 2007 SCC 5	May 12, 2006	January 31, 2007									
R v Trochym, 2007 SCC 6	May 9, 2006	February 1, 2007									
Resurfice Corp v Hanke, 2007 SCC 7	December 12, 2006	February 8, 2007									
Dickie v Dickie, 2007 SCC 8	January 17, 2007	February 9, 2007									
Charkaoui v Canada (Citizenship and Immigration), 2007 SCC 9	June 13, 2006	February 23, 2007									
Canada (AG) v Hislop, 2007 SCC 10	May 16, 2006	March 1, 2007									
Case name	Argued	Decided	McLachlin	Bastarache	Binnie	LeBel	Deschamps	Fish	Abella	Charron	Rothstein
R v Spencer, 2007 SCC 11	October 17, 2006	March 8, 2007									
R v Bryan, 2007 SCC 12	October 16, 2006	March 15, 2007									
Phoenix Bulk Carriers Ltd v Kremikovtzi Trade, 2007 SCC 13	February 14, 2007	March 16, 2007									
Lévis (City) v Fraternité des policiers de Lévis Inc, 2007 SCC 14	November 7, 2006	March 22, 2007					1	1	2		
Council of Canadians with Disabilities v Via Rail Canada Inc, 2007 SCC 15	may 19. 2006	March 23, 2007									
Ambroise Joseph McKay v Her Majesty the Queen, 2007 SCC 16		March 23, 2007									
Pecore v Pecore, 2007 SCC 17	December 6, 2006	May 3, 2007									
Madsen Estate v Saylor, 2007 SCC 18	December 7, 2006	May 3, 2007									
Dunne v Quebec (Deputy Minister of Revenue), 2007 SCC 19	February 21, 2007	May 10, 2007									
Impulsora Turistica de Occidente, SA de CV v Transat Tours Canada Inc, 2007 SCC 20	April 25. 2007	May 25, 2007									
Case name	Argued	Decided	McLachlin	Bastarache	Binnie	LeBel	Deschamps	Fish	Abella	Charron	Rothstein
British Columbia (AG) v Christie, 2007 SCC 21	March 21, 2007	May 25, 2007									
Canadian Western Bank v Alberta, 2007 SCC 22	April 11, 2006	May 31, 2007									
British Columbia (AG) v Lafarge Canada Inc, 2007 SCC 23	November 8, 2005	May 31, 2007									
Strother v 3464920 Canada Inc, 2007 SCC 24	October 11, 2006	June 1, 2007									
R v Teskey, 2007 SCC 25	February 22, 2007	June 7, 2007									
R v Hape, 2007 SCC 26	October 12, 2006	June 7, 2007		1	2				1		1
Health Services and Support - Facilities Subsector Bargaining Assn v British Columbia, 2007 SCC 27	February 8, 2006	June 8, 2007									
R v Couture, 2007 SCC 28	May 15, 2006	June 15, 2007									
London (City) v RSJ Holdings Inc, 2007 SCC 29	November 15, 2006	June 21, 2007									
Canada (AG) v JTI-Macdonald Corp, 2007 SCC 30	February 19, 2007	June 28, 2007									
Case name	Argued	Decided	McLachlin	Bastarache	Binnie	LeBel	Deschamps	Fish	Abella	Charron	Rothstein
Baier v Alberta, 2007 SCC 31	November 9, 2006	June 29, 2007									
R v Clayton, 2007 SCC 32	June 19. 2006	July 6, 2007									
Canada v Addison & Leyen Ltd, 2007 SCC 33	May 24, 2007	July 12, 2007									
Dell Computer Corp v Union des consommateurs, 2007 SCC 34	December 13, 2006	July 13, 2007									
Rogers Wireless Inc v Muroff, 2007 SCC 35	December 14, 2006	July 13, 2007									
R v Steele, 2007 SCC 36	April 27, 2007	July 20, 2007									
Euro-Excellence Inc v Kraft Canada Inc, 2007 SCC 37	January 16, 2007	July 27, 2007		1				2			
Syl Apps Secure Treatment Centre v BD, 2007 SCC 38	April 26, 2007	July 27, 2007									
R v Rhyason, 2007 SCC 39	May 17, 2007	July 27, 2007									
Alliance for Marriage and Family v AA, 2007 SCC 40		September 13, 2007									
Case name	Argued	Decided	McLachlin	Bastarache	Binnie	LeBel	Deschamps	Fish	Abella	Charron	Rothstein
Hill v Hamilton-Wentworth Regional Police Services Board, 2007 SCC 41	November 10, 2006	October 4, 2007									
AYSA Amateur Youth Soccer Association v Canada (Revenue Agency), 2007 SCC 42	May 16, 2007	October 4, 2007									
Named Person v Vancouver Sun, 2007 SCC 44	April 24, 2007	October 11, 2007									
Kerr v Danier Leather Inc, 2007 SCC 45	March 20, 2007	October 12, 2007									
Citadel General Assurance Co v Vytlingam, 2007 SCC 46	December 11, 2006	October 19, 2007									
Lumbermens Mutual Casualty Co v Herbison, 2007 SCC 47	December 11, 2006	October 19, 2007									
R v Singh, 2007 SCC 48	May 23, 2007	November 1, 2007									
R v Trotta, 2007 SCC 49	October 12, 2007	November 8, 2007									
ABB Inc v Domtar Inc, 2007 SCC 50	November 8, 2006	November 22, 2007									
Case name	Argued	Decided	McLachlin	Bastarache	Binnie	LeBel	Deschamps	Fish	Abella	Charron	Rothstein
R v Grover, 2007 SCC 51	November 6, 2007	November 22, 2007									
R v Jackson, 2007 SCC 52	October 19, 2007	December 6, 2007									
R v Daley, 2007 SCC 53	May 18, 2007	December 13, 2007									
Bruker v Marcovitz, 2007 SCC 54	December 5, 2006	December 14, 2007									
Jedfro Investments (USA) Ltd v Jacyk, 2007 SCC 55	October 11, 2007	December 20, 2007									

== See also ==
- 2007 decisions: CanLII LexUM

== Table key ==
Delivered the Court's reason
Joined the Court's reason
Filed a concurrence
Joined a concurrence
Filed a dissent
Joined a dissent
Filed a concurrence/dissent
Joined a concurrence/dissent
Did not participate in the judgment
Did not participate in the final disposition of the judgment
Not a member of the Court at the time of hearing or delivering
- Decisions that do not note a Justice delivering the Court's reason are per coram.
- Multiple concurrences and dissents within a case are numbered, with joining votes numbered accordingly. Justices occasionally join multiple reasons in a single case; each vote is subdivided accordingly.
- Multiple unnumbered reasons are jointly written or delivered.
- Decisions that are given orally from the bench are denoted by a "V"; per coram decisions delivered orally from the bench only note a "V" on the most senior justice on the panel.
- An asterisk ( * ) in the Court's opinion denotes that it was only a majority in part or a plurality.
