= 1997 reasons of the Supreme Court of Canada =

The table below lists the reasons delivered from the bench by the Supreme Court of Canada during 1997. The table illustrates what reasons were filed by each justice in each case, and which justices joined each reason. This list, however, does not include reasons on motions.

== Reasons ==
Delivered the Court's reason
Joined the Court's reason
Filed a concurrence
Joined a concurrence
Filed a dissent
Joined a dissent
Filed a concurrence/dissent
Joined a concurrence/dissent
Did not participate in the judgment
Did not participate in the final disposition of the judgment
Not a member of the Court at the time of hearing or delivering
- Decisions that do not note a Justice delivering the Court's reason are per coram.
- Multiple concurrences and dissents within a case are numbered, with joining votes numbered accordingly. Justices occasionally join multiple reasons in a single case; each vote is subdivided accordingly.
- Multiple unnumbered reasons are jointly written or delivered.
- Decisions that are given orally from the bench are denoted by a "V"; per coram decisions delivered orally from the bench only note a "V" on the most senior justice on the panel.
- An asterisk ( * ) in the Court's opinion denotes that it was only a majority in part or a plurality.

Case name	Argued	Decided	Lamer	La Forest	L'Heureux‑ Dubé	Sopinka	Gonthier	Cory	McLachlin	Iacobucci	Major
R v Hinse, [1997] 1 S.C.R. 3	January 21, 1997	January 21, 1997					V
Burlington Northern Railroad Co v Canadian National Railway Co, [1997] 1 S.C.R. 5	January 21, 1997	January 21, 1997		V
R v Osvath, [1997] 1 S.C.R. 7	January 23, 1997	January 23, 1997			V
R v C(DA), [1997] 1 S.C.R. 8	January 24, 1997	January 24, 1997				V
Toronto Area Transit Operating Authority v Dell Holdings Ltd, [1997] 1 S.C.R. 32	October 9, 1996	January 30, 1997
R v Finn, [1997] 1 S.C.R. 10	January 30, 1997	January 30, 1997				V
R v Delaronde, [1997] 1 S.C.R. 213	January 30, 1997	January 30, 1997	V
Hill v Nova Scotia (AG), [1997] 1 S.C.R. 69	November 27, 1996	January 30, 1997
Comeau's Sea Foods Ltd v Canada (Minister of Fisheries and Oceans), [1997] 1 S.C.R. 12	October 2, 1996	January 30, 1997
R v Leipert, [1997] 1 S.C.R. 281	November 28, 1996	February 6, 1997
Case name	Argued	Decided	Lamer	La Forest	L'Heureux‑ Dubé	Sopinka	Gonthier	Cory	McLachlin	Iacobucci	Major
R v Latimer, [1997] 1 S.C.R. 217	November 27, 1996	February 6, 1997
R v Carosella, [1997] 1 S.C.R. 80	June 19, 1996	February 6, 1997
Eaton v Brant County Board of Education, [1997] 1 S.C.R. 241	October 8, 1996	February 6, 1997
R v Jensen, [1997] 1 S.C.R. 304	February 11, 1997	February 11, 1997				V
R v MacDonnell, [1997] 1 S.C.R. 305	February 13, 1997	February 13, 1997				V
R v Wickstead, [1997] 1 S.C.R. 307	February 14, 1997	February 14, 1997				V
Goodswimmer v Canada (Minister of Indian Affairs and Northern Development), [1997] 1 S.C.R. 309	February 18, 1997	February 18, 1997	V
R v Thompson, [1997] 1 S.C.R. 311	February 19, 1997	February 19, 1997	V
R v Naud, [1997] 1 S.C.R. 312	February 20, 1997	February 20, 1997
R v Jacquard, [1997] 1 S.C.R. 314	October 10, 1996	February 20, 1997				1		2			1
Case name	Argued	Decided	Lamer	La Forest	L'Heureux‑ Dubé	Sopinka	Gonthier	Cory	McLachlin	Iacobucci	Major
R v Russell, [1997] 1 S.C.R. 356	February 21, 1997	February 21, 1997									V
Toronto (City of) Board of Education v Ontario Secondary School Teachers' Federation, District 15, [1997] 1 S.C.R. 487	November 6, 1996	February 27, 1997
Royal Bank of Canada v Sparrow Electric Corp, [1997] 1 S.C.R. 411	June 19, 1996	February 27, 1997
Benner v Canada (Secretary of State), [1997] 1 S.C.R. 358	October 1, 1996	February 27, 1997
R v Halnuck, [1997] 1 S.C.R. 533	March 19, 1997	March 19, 1997	V
R v Stillman, [1997] 1 S.C.R. 607	January 26, 1996; November 7, 1996	March 20, 1997			1		2		3
R v Melnichuk, [1997] 1 S.C.R. 602	March 17, 1997	March 20, 1997
R v Haroun, [1997] 1 S.C.R. 593	January 24, 1997	March 20, 1997
R v Curragh Inc, [1997] 1 S.C.R. 537	November 26, 1996	March 20, 1997
R v Buric, [1997] 1 S.C.R. 535	March 20, 1997	March 20, 1997				V
Case name	Argued	Decided	Lamer	La Forest	L'Heureux‑ Dubé	Sopinka	Gonthier	Cory	McLachlin	Iacobucci	Major
Canada (Director of Investigation and Research) v Southam Inc, [1997] 1 S.C.R. 748	November 25, 1996	March 20, 1997
Farber v Royal Trust Co, [1997] 1 S.C.R. 846	November 28, 1996	March 27, 1997
Canadian Union of Public Employees, Local 301 v Montreal (City of), [1997] 1 S.C.R. 793	November 5, 1996	March 27, 1997
Germain v Montreal (City of), [1997] 1 S.C.R. 1144	April 23, 1997	April 23, 1997		V
R v Noble, [1997] 1 S.C.R. 874	October 29, 1996	April 24, 1997	1	2			2		3
R v McDonnell, [1997] 1 S.C.R. 948	December 6, 1996	April 24, 1997
R v Cook, [1997] 1 S.C.R. 1113	February 20, 1997	April 24, 1997
Pointe-Claire (City of) v Quebec (Labour Court), [1997] 1 S.C.R. 1015	November 6, 1996	April 24, 1997
Hamstra (Guardian ad litem of) v British Columbia Rugby Union, [1997] 1 S.C.R. 1092	January 23, 1997	April 24, 1997
R v Coreas, [1997] 1 S.C.R. 1147	April 25, 1997	April 25, 1997	V
Case name	Argued	Decided	Lamer	La Forest	L'Heureux‑ Dubé	Sopinka	Gonthier	Cory	McLachlin	Iacobucci	Major
Brkich & Brkich Enterprises Ltd v American Home Assurance Co, [1997] 1 S.C.R. 1149	April 28, 1997	April 28, 1997		V
R v Doliente, [1997] 2 S.C.R. 11	May 20, 1997	May 20, 1997				V
Soulos v Korkontzilas, [1997] 2 S.C.R. 217	February 18, 1997	May 22, 1997
R v Feeney, [1997] 2 S.C.R. 13	June 11, 1996	May 22, 1997	2		1		1		1
R v Currie, [1997] 2 S.C.R. 260	January 31, 1997	May 22, 1997
Opetchesaht Indian Band v Canada, [1997] 2 S.C.R. 119	October 28, 1996	May 22, 1997
Hercules Managements Ltd v Ernst & Young, [1997] 2 S.C.R. 165	December 6, 1996	May 22, 1997
R v Senior, [1997] 2 S.C.R. 288	May 23, 1997	May 23, 1997	V
Martin v Artyork Investments Ltd, [1997] 2 S.C.R. 290	May 26, 1997	May 26, 1997								V
R v Bedford, [1997] 2 S.C.R. 292	May 27, 1997	May 27, 1997				V
Case name	Argued	Decided	Lamer	La Forest	L'Heureux‑ Dubé	Sopinka	Gonthier	Cory	McLachlin	Iacobucci	Major
United States of America v Desfossés, [1997] 2 S.C.R. 326	April 21, 1997	May 29, 1997
Sylvester v British Columbia, [1997] 2 S.C.R. 315	February 13, 1997	May 29, 1997
Construction Gilles Paquette ltée v Entreprises Végo ltée, [1997] 2 S.C.R. 299	February 12, 1997	May 29, 1997
Canada Post Corp v Canadian Union of Postal Workers, [1997] 2 S.C.R. 294	February 12, 1997	May 29, 1997
R v Jack, [1997] 2 S.C.R. 334	June 20, 1997	June 20, 1997	V
R v Allender, [1997] 2 S.C.R. 333	June 20, 1997	June 20, 1997	V /R
United States of America v Dynar, [1997] 2 S.C.R. 462	January 28, 1997	June 26, 1997
St Mary's Indian Band v Cranbrook (City of), [1997] 2 S.C.R. 657	June 26, 1997	June 26, 1997
R v Mara, [1997] 2 S.C.R. 630	March 12, 1997	June 26, 1997
R v La, [1997] 2 S.C.R. 680	March 13, 1997	June 26, 1997
Case name	Argued	Decided	Lamer	La Forest	L'Heureux‑ Dubé	Sopinka	Gonthier	Cory	McLachlin	Iacobucci	Major
Hickman Motors Ltd v Canada, [1997] 2 S.C.R. 336	October 30, 1996	June 26, 1997
Dagg v Canada (Minister of Finance), [1997] 2 S.C.R. 403	January 22, 1997	June 26, 1997
Arndt v Smith, [1997] 2 S.C.R. 539	January 29, 1997	June 26, 1997
Armada Lines Ltd v Chaleur Fertilizers Ltd, [1997] 2 S.C.R. 617	March 11, 1997	June 26, 1997
Air Canada v Ontario (Liquor Control Board), [1997] 2 S.C.R. 581	February 17, 1997	June 26, 1997
Côté v Canada (Director of Investigation and Research), [1997] 2 S.C.R. 714	June 27, 1997	June 27, 1997	V
R v Greyeyes, [1997] 2 S.C.R. 825	April 29, 1997	July 10, 1997
R v G(SG), [1997] 2 S.C.R. 716	March 17, 1997	July 10, 1997
R v Esau, [1997] 2 S.C.R. 777	March 18, 1997	July 10, 1997			1				2
R v Cogger, [1997] 2 S.C.R. 845	May 26, 1997	July 10, 1997
Case name	Argued	Decided	Lamer	La Forest	L'Heureux‑ Dubé	Sopinka	Gonthier	Cory	McLachlin	Iacobucci	Major
Doré v Verdun (City of), [1997] 2 S.C.R. 862	January 27, 1997	July 10, 1997
Pasiechnyk v Saskatchewan (Workers' Compensation Board), [1997] 2 S.C.R. 890	April 30, 1997	August 28, 1997
Reference Re Remuneration of Judges of the Provincial Court of Prince Edward Island; Reference Re Independence and Impartiality of Judges of the Provincial Court of Prince Edward Island, [1997] 3 S.C.R. 3	December 3, 4, 1996	September 18, 1997
R v Lifchus, [1997] 3 S.C.R. 320	May 29, 1997	September 18, 1997
R v Hydro-Québec, [1997] 3 S.C.R. 213	February 10, 1997	September 18, 1997
St Mary's Indian Band v Cranbrook (City of), [1997] 2 S.C.R. 678	February 19, 1997	September 23, 1997
R v Belnavis, [1997] 3 S.C.R. 341	May 27, 1997	September 25, 1997
Canada (Minister of Citizenship and Immigration) v Tobiass, [1997] 3 S.C.R. 391	June 26, 1997	September 25, 1997
R v S(RD), [1997] 3 S.C.R. 484	March 10, 1997	September 26, 1997			2		1		2
Peixeiro v Haberman, [1997] 3 S.C.R. 549	March 13, 1997	September 26, 1997
Case name	Argued	Decided	Lamer	La Forest	L'Heureux‑ Dubé	Sopinka	Gonthier	Cory	McLachlin	Iacobucci	Major
Canada (AG) v Canada (Commission of Inquiry on the Blood System), [1997] 3 S.C.R. 440	June 25, 1997	September 26, 1997
Libman v Quebec (AG), [1997] 3 S.C.R. 569	April 22, 1997	October 9, 1997
Eldridge v British Columbia (AG), [1997] 3 S.C.R. 624	April 24, 1997	October 9, 1997
R v Solomon, [1997] 3 S.C.R. 696	October 10, 1997	October 10, 1997								V
R v Lawes, [1997] 3 S.C.R. 694	October 10, 1997	October 10, 1997						V
R v Ly, [1997] 3 S.C.R. 698	October 17, 1997	October 17, 1997							V
R v Allen, [1997] 3 S.C.R. 700	October 17, 1997	October 17, 1997				V
Wallace v United Grain Growers Ltd, [1997] 3 S.C.R. 701	May 22, 1997	October 30, 1997
Gold v Rosenberg, [1997] 3 S.C.R. 767	May 11, 1997	October 30, 1997
Citadel General Assurance Co v Lloyds Bank Canada, [1997] 3 S.C.R. 805	May 20, 1997	October 30, 1997
Case name	Argued	Decided	Lamer	La Forest	L'Heureux‑ Dubé	Sopinka	Gonthier	Cory	McLachlin	Iacobucci	Major
Winnipeg Child and Family Services (Northwest Area) v G(DF), [1997] 3 S.C.R. 925	June 18, 1997	October 31, 1997
Godbout v Longueuil (City of), [1997] 3 S.C.R. 844	May 28, 1997	October 31, 1997	1	2	2	1			2		1
R v Skalbania, [1997] 3 S.C.R. 995	November 6, 1997	November 6, 1997							V
S(L) v S(C), [1997] 3 S.C.R. 1003	November 7, 1997	November 7, 1997			V
R v Labrecque, [1997] 3 S.C.R. 1001	November 7, 1997	November 7, 1997			V
R v Bablitz, [1997] 3 S.C.R. 1005	November 14, 1997	November 14, 1997			V
R v Charland, [1997] 3 S.C.R. 1006	December 4, 1997	December 4, 1997
Mochinski v Trendline Industries Ltd, [1997] 3 S.C.R. 1176	October 7, 1997	December 11, 1997
Lewis (Guardian ad litem of) v British Columbia, [1997] 3 S.C.R. 1145	October 7, 1997	December 11, 1997
Delgamuukw v British Columbia, [1997] 3 S.C.R. 1010	June 16, 17, 1997	December 11, 1997		1					2
Case name	Argued	Decided	Lamer	La Forest	L'Heureux‑ Dubé	Sopinka	Gonthier	Cory	McLachlin	Iacobucci	Major
R v F(CC), [1997] 3 S.C.R. 1183	October 16, 1997	December 18, 1997
Porto Seguro Companhia de Seguros Gerais v Belcan SA, [1997] 3 S.C.R. 1278	October 14, 1997	December 18, 1997
Bow Valley Husky (Bermuda) Ltd v Saint John Shipbuilding Ltd, [1997] 3 S.C.R. 1210	June 19, 1997	December 18, 1997
