= 2000 reasons of the Supreme Court of Canada =

The table below lists the reasons delivered from the bench by the Supreme Court of Canada during 2000. The table illustrates what reasons were filed by each justice in each case, and which justices joined each reason. This list, however, does not include decisions on motions.

Of the 65 judgments released in 2000, 9 were oral, and 42 were unanimous, and there were 4 motions.

== Reasons ==
Case name	Argued	Decided	Lamer	L'Heureux- Dubé	Gonthier	McLachlin	Iacobucci	Major	Bastarache	Binnie	Arbour	LeBel
Arsenault-Cameron v Prince Edward Island, [2000] 1 S.C.R. 3; 2000 SCC 1	November 4, 1999	January 13, 2000										
Kovach v British Columbia (Workers' Compensation Board), [2000] 1 S.C.R. 55; 2000 SCC 3	January 20, 2000	January 20, 2000				V						
Lindsay v Saskatchewan (Workers' Compensation Board), [2000] 1 S.C.R. 59; 2000 SCC 4	January 20, 2000	January 20, 2000				V						
R v Proulx, [2000] 1 S.C.R. 61; 2000 SCC 5	May 25, 26, 1999	January 31, 2000										
R v LFW, [2000] 1 S.C.R. 132; 2000 SCC 6	May 25, 26, 1999	January 31, 2000										
R v RNS, [2000] 1 S.C.R. 149; 2000 SCC 7	May 25, 26, 1999	January 31, 2000		1	2	3			4			
R v RAR, [2000] 1 S.C.R. 163; 2000 SCC 8	May 25, 26, 1999	January 31, 2000										
R v Bunn, [2000] 1 S.C.R. 183; 2000 SCC 9	May 25, 26, 1999	January 31, 2000										
R v Wells, [2000] 1 S.C.R. 207; 2000 SCC 10	May 27, 1999	February 17, 2000										
R v Brooks, [2000] 1 S.C.R. 237; 2000 SCC 11	October 8, 1999	February 17, 2000										
Case name	Argued	Decided	Lamer	L'Heureux- Dubé	Gonthier	McLachlin	Iacobucci	Major	Bastarache	Binnie	Arbour	LeBel
Ingles v Tutkaluk Construction Ltd, [2000] 1 S.C.R. 298; 2000 SCC 12	October 8, 1999	March 2, 2000										
Nanaimo (City of) v Rascal Trucking Ltd, [2000] 1 S.C.R. 342; 2000 SCC 13	November 3, 1999	March 2, 2000										
Regina Police Assn Inc v. Regina (City of) Board of Police Commissioners, [2000] 1 S.C.R. 360; 2000 SCC 14	November 12, 1999	March 2, 2000										
R v Biniaris, [2000] 1 S.C.R. 381; 2000 SCC 15	October 5, 6, 1999	April 13, 2000										
R v Molodowic, [2000] 1 S.C.R. 420; 2000 SCC 16	October 5, 6, 1999	April 13, 2000										
R v AG, [2000] 1 S.C.R. 439; 2000 SCC 17	October 5, 6, 1999	April 13, 2000										
R v Wust, [2000] 1 S.C.R. 455; 2000 SCC 18	November 9, 1999	April 13, 2000										
R v Arthurs, [2000] 1 S.C.R. 481; 2000 SCC 19	November 9, 1999	April 13, 2000										
R v Arrance, [2000] 1 S.C.R. 488; 2000 SCC 20	November 9, 1999	April 13, 2000										
Global Securities Corp v British Columbia (Securities Commission), [2000] 1 S.C.R. 494; 2000 SCC 21	January 25, 2000	April 13, 2000										
Case name	Argued	Decided	Lamer	L'Heureux- Dubé	Gonthier	McLachlin	Iacobucci	Major	Bastarache	Binnie	Arbour	LeBel
R v GDB, [2000] 1 S.C.R. 520; 2000 SCC 22	January 28, 2000	April 27, 2000										
Ajax (Town of) v CAW, Local 222, [2000] 1 S.C.R. 538; 2000 SCC 23	February 16, 2000	April 27, 2000										
Non-Marine Underwriters, Lloyd's of London v Scalera, [2000] 1 S.C.R. 551; 2000 SCC 24	October 14, 1999	May 3, 2000										
Sansalone v Wawanesa Mutual Insurance Co, [2000] 1 S.C.R. 627; 2000 SCC 25	October 14, 1999	May 3, 2000										
Laflamme v Prudential-Bache Commodities Canada Ltd, [2000] 1 S.C.R. 638; 2000 SCC 26	November 2, 1999	May 3, 2000										
Quebec (Commission des droits de la personne et des droits de la jeunesse) v Montréal (City of); Quebec (Commission des droits de la personne et des droits de la jeunesse) v Boisbriand (City of), [2000] 1 S.C.R. 665; 2000 SCC 27	November 8, 1999	May 3, 2000										
Granovsky v Canada (Minister of Employment and Immigration), [2000] 1 S.C.R. 703; 2000 SCC 28	November 10, 1999	May 18, 2000										
R v Jolivet, [2000] 1 S.C.R. 751; 2000 SCC 29	February 19, 1999	May 18, 2000										
R v ARB, [2000] 1 S.C.R. 781; 2000 SCC 30	June 13, 2000	June 13, 2000				V						
Reference Re Firearms Act, [2000] 1 S.C.R. 783; 2000 SCC 31	February 21, 22, 2000	June 15, 2000										
Case name	Argued	Decided	Lamer	L'Heureux- Dubé	Gonthier	McLachlin	Iacobucci	Major	Bastarache	Binnie	Arbour	LeBel
Reference re Gruenke, [2000] 1 S.C.R. 836; 2000 SCC 32	June 15, 2000	June 15, 2000				V						
R v Cacheway, [2000] 1 S.C.R. 838; 2000 SCC 33	June 15, 2000	June 15, 2000					V					
Friedmann Equity Developments Inc v Final Note Ltd, [2000] 1 S.C.R. 842; 2000 SCC 34	January 27, 2000	July 20, 2000										
FN (Re), [2000] 1 S.C.R. 880; 2000 SCC 35	November 3, 1999	July 20, 2000										
Will-Kare Paving & Contracting Ltd v Canada, [2000] 1 S.C.R. 915; 2000 SCC 36	November 10, 1999	July 20, 2000										
Lovelace v Ontario, [2000] 1 S.C.R. 950; 2000 SCC 37	December 7, 1999	July 20, 2000										
R v Oickle, [2000] 2 S.C.R. 3; 2000 SCC 38	November 2, 1999	September 29, 2000										
R v Morrisey, [2000] 2 S.C.R. 90; 2000 SCC 39	December 9, 1999	September 29, 2000										
R v Starr, [2000] 2 S.C.R. 144; 2000 SCC 40	December 3, 1998/February 24, 2000	September 29, 2000		1	1	2			2			
R v Caouette, [2000] 2 S.C.R. 271; 2000 SCC 41	October 4, 2000	October 4, 2000										V
Case name	Argued	Decided	Lamer	L'Heureux- Dubé	Gonthier	McLachlin	Iacobucci	Major	Bastarache	Binnie	Arbour	LeBel
R v Hamelin, [2000] 2 S.C.R. 273; 2000 SCC 42	October 4, 2000	October 4, 2000										
R v DD, [2000] 2 S.C.R. 275; 2000 SCC 43	March 14, 2000	October 5, 2000										
Blencoe v British Columbia (Human Rights Commission), [2000] 2 S.C.R. 307; 2000 SCC 44	January 24, 2000	October 5, 2000										
Public School Boards' Assn of Alberta v Alberta (AG), [2000] 2 S.C.R. 409; 2000 SCC 45	March 21, 22, 2000	October 6, 2000										
R v Darrach, [2000] 2 S.C.R. 443; 2000 SCC 46	February 23, 2000	October 12, 2000										
R v Lévesque, [2000] 2 S.C.R. 487; 2000 SCC 47	March 23, 2000	October 12, 2000										
Winnipeg Child and Family Services v KLW, [2000] 2 S.C.R. 519; 2000 SCC 48	February 25, 2000	October 13, 2000										
R v MO, [2000] 2 S.C.R. 594; 2000 SCC 49	October 13, 2000	October 13, 2000				V						
R v Sutton, [2000] 2 S.C.R. 595; 2000 SCC 50	October 6, 2000	November 9, 2000										
R v J-LJ, [2000] 2 S.C.R. 600; 2000 SCC 51	December 10, 1999	November 9, 2000										
Case name	Argued	Decided	Lamer	L'Heureux- Dubé	Gonthier	McLachlin	Iacobucci	Major	Bastarache	Binnie	Arbour	LeBel
Musqueam Indian Band v Glass, [2000] 2 S.C.R. 633; 2000 SCC 52	June 12, 2000	November 9, 2000										
R v Charlebois, [2000] 2 S.C.R. 674; 2000 SCC 53	April 13, 2000	November 10, 2000										
R v Beauchamp, [2000] 2 S.C.R. 720; 2000 SCC 54	December 8, 1999	November 10, 2000										
R v Russell, [2000] 2 S.C.R. 731; 2000 SCC 55	November 5, 1999	November 10, 2000										
R v Avetysan, [2000] 2 S.C.R. 745; 2000 SCC 56	January 28, 2000	November 10, 2000										
R v Knoblauch, [2000] 2 S.C.R. 780; 2000 SCC 58	April 17, 2000	November 16, 2000		2	2		1		2			
Martel Building Ltd v Canada, [2000] 2 S.C.R. 860; 2000 SCC 60	February 17, 2000	November 30, 2000										
R v Simard, [2000] 2 S.C.R. 911; 2000 SCC 61	December 5, 2000	December 5, 2000				V						
Syndicat de l'enseignement du Grand-Portage v Morency, [2000] 2 S.C.R. 913; 2000 SCC 62	December 11, 2000	December 11, 2000										V
Pacific National Investments Ltd v Victoria (City of), [2000] 2 S.C.R. 919; 2000 SCC 64	May 25, 2000	December 14, 2000										
Case name	Argued	Decided	Lamer	L'Heureux- Dubé	Gonthier	McLachlin	Iacobucci	Major	Bastarache	Binnie	Arbour	LeBel
R v Araujo, [2000] 2 S.C.R. 992; 2000 SCC 65	April 11, 12, 2000	December 14, 2000										
Free World Trust v Électro Santé Inc, [2000] 2 S.C.R. 1024; 2000 SCC 66	December 14, 1999	December 15, 2000										
Whirlpool Corp v Camco Inc, [2000] 2 S.C.R. 1067; 2000 SCC 67	December 14, 1999	December 15, 2000										
Whirlpool Corp v Maytag Corp, [2000] 2 S.C.R. 1116; 2000 SCC 68	December 14, 1999	December 15, 2000										
Little Sisters Book and Art Emporium v Canada (Minister of Justice), [2000] 2 S.C.R. 1120; 2000 SCC 69	March 16, 2000	December 15, 2000										

== Justices of the Supreme Court ==
Justice	Reasons written	Votes cast	% Majority
Chief Justice Antonio Lamer (retired January 6, 2000)	4 / 0 / 0 / 1 / Total=05	1 / 0 / 0 / 0 / Total=01	5 of 6 (83.33%)
Puisne Justice Claire L'Heureux-Dubé	4 / 2 / 0 / 2 / Total=08	39 / 0 / 1 / 4 / Total=44	45 of 52 (86.54%)
Puisne Justice Charles Gonthier	5 / 1 / 0 / 0 / Total=06	40 / 1 / 1 / 3 / Total=45	47 of 51 (92.16%)
Puisne Justice Beverley McLachlin	10 / 1 / 1 / 2 / Total=14	39 / 2 / 0 / 3 / Total=44	52 of 58 (89.66%)
Puisne Justice Frank Iacobucci	38 / 0 / 1 / 3 / Total=42	9 / 2 / 1 / 1 / Total=13	49 of 55 (89.09%)
Puisne Justice John C. Major	8 / 0 / 0 / 1 / Total=09	43 / 2 / 0 / 1 / Total=46	53 of 55 (96.36%)
Pusine Justice Michel Bastarache	7 / 2 / 0 / 5 / Total=14	46 / 2 / 0 / 2 / Total=50	57 of 64 (89.06%)
Puisne Justice Ian Binnie	8 / 1 / 0 / 1 / Total=10	42 / 0 / 1 / 3 / Total=46	51 of 56 (91.07%)
Pusine Justice Louise Arbour (appointed September 15, 1999)	8 / 1 / 0 / 3 / Total=12	31 / 0 / 2 / 2 / Total=35	40 of 47 (85.11%)
Pusine Justice Louis LeBel (appointed January 7, 2000)	4 / 0 / 1 / 0 / Total=05	17 / 0 / 0 / 0 / Total=17	21 of 22 (95.45%)
This Notes on statistics: A justice is only included in the majority if they have joined or concurred in the Court's judgment in full. Percentages are based only on the cases in which a justice participated, and are rounded to the nearest tenth of a percent.

== Table key ==
Delivered the Court's reason
Joined the Court's reason
Filed a concurrence
Joined a concurrence
Filed a dissent
Joined a dissent
Filed a concurrence/dissent
Joined a concurrence/dissent
Did not participate in the judgment
Did not participate in the final disposition of the judgment
Not a member of the Court at the time of hearing or delivering
- Decisions that do not note a Justice delivering the Court's reason are per coram.
- Multiple concurrences and dissents within a case are numbered, with joining votes numbered accordingly. Justices occasionally join multiple reasons in a single case; each vote is subdivided accordingly.
- Multiple unnumbered reasons are jointly written or delivered.
- Decisions that are given orally from the bench are denoted by a "V"; per coram decisions delivered orally from the bench only note a "V" on the most senior justice on the panel.
- An asterisk ( * ) in the Court's opinion denotes that it was only a majority in part or a plurality.
