= NIL/TU,O Child and Family Services Society v BC Government and Service Employees' Union =

- Supreme Court of Canada

Hearing: November 4, 2010 Judgment: December 8, 2010
- Full case name: NIL/TU,O Child and Family Services Society v. B.C. Government and Service Employees’ Union
- Citations: 2010 SCC 45
- Docket No.: 32862
- Ruling: Appeal dismissed

Court membership
- Chief Justice: Beverley McLachlin; Puisne Justices: Ian Binnie, Louis LeBel, Marie Deschamps, Morris Fish, Rosalie Abella, Louise Charron, Marshall Rothstein, Thomas Cromwell

Reasons given
- Majority: Abella J, joined by LeBel, Deschamps, Charron, Rothstein and Cromwell JJ
- Concur/dissent: McLachlin CJ and Fish J, joined by Binnie J

NIL/TU,O Child and Family Services Society v BC Government and Service Employees' Union is a leading Supreme Court of Canada constitutional law case dealing with jurisdiction over labour relations in the context of federalism and Aboriginal rights.

== Background ==
In 1997, child welfare agency NIL/TU,O was created pursuant to the British Columbia Society Act. NIL/TU,O's mandate was to provide child care services to First Nations children in a "culturally appropriate" context. NIL/TU,O was subject to a tripartite agreement under which the province delegated control over certain child welfare services to NIL/TU,O; the federal government provided around 65% of NIL/TU,O's funding.

The British Columbia Government and Service Employees' Union (BCGSEU) applied to the British Columbia Labour Relations Board for certification as NIL/TU,O's collective bargaining agent. The Board certified the BCGSEU despite NIL/TU,O's argument that labour relations were subject to federal jurisdiction. The Board rejected an appeal.

== The courts below ==
The issue was judicially reviewed at the Supreme Court of British Columbia, where the judge overturned the Board's decision, holding that NIL/TU,O's labour relations were subject to federal jurisdiction. In response, NIL/TU,O applied for and received certification under the Canada Labour Code. The BCGSEU appealed the judge's decision to the British Columbia Court of Appeal, who reversed the earlier decision, finding that NIL/TU,O was instead subject to provincial jurisdiction.

== Decision of the Supreme Court ==
The court unanimously held that NIL/TU,O fell under provincial jurisdiction. However, the court was split as to the application of the test used to determine whether labour relations fell under provincial or federal jurisdiction.

=== Majority ===
The majority, led by Abella J, affirmed the Court of Appeal's decision. The majority noted that although labour relations do not fall within section 91 or section 92 of the Constitution Act, 1867, Toronto Electric Commissioners v Snider created the presumption that labour relations fall within provincial jurisdiction. In deciding whether NIL/TU,O was a federal work or undertaking, the majority noted that the labour relations functional test traditionally did not undertake an interjurisdictional immunity analysis by determining whether "provincial regulation of the entity's labour relations would impair the core of the federal head of power". The majority held that the same traditional approach should be applied to cases where section 91(24) of the Constitution Act, 1867, which grants federal jurisdiction over "Indians, and Lands reserved for the Indians", was at issue. This approach would make it unnecessary to undertake an "impairing core" analysis unless the traditional functional test was not determinative of the issue.

Applying the traditional functional labour relations test to the facts, the majority held that NIL/TU,O was regulated solely by the province of British Columbia, that its function was "unquestionably a provincial one", since NIL/TU,O was obligated to adhere to the province's statutory standards, and that the province retained "ultimate decision-making control" over NIL/TU,O. Further, the majority found that the federal government's financial contributions were insufficient to make NIL/TU,O a federal undertaking.

=== Minority ===
The minority, led by McLachlin CJ and Fish J, affirmed the result of the Court of Appeal but disagreed with the majority's decision on the test to be used in an Aboriginal context. The minority preferred a test that determined whether NIL/TU,O's operations fell within the "protected core of Indianness" found in s 91(24) of the Constitution Act, 1867, in accordance with the interjurisdictional immunity doctrine. Their approach would restrict federal jurisdiction over Indian labour relations situations to those where the "ordinary and habitual activities of the operation affect core aspects of Indian status, or are conducted pursuant to federal delegated authority".

The minority agreed in result with the majority, however, holding that NIL/TU,O's operations did not sufficiently implicate Indian issues as to infringe upon the "protected core of Indianness".

== Impact ==
The decision was criticized by law blog The Court, suggesting that "both versions of the… test are equally perplexing" and that the majority's application of the traditional functional test in an Aboriginal context "resulted in a final analysis that became disengaged with the facts". Maggie Wente, writing in the Indigenous Law Journal, noted that "There are myriad other kinds of Aboriginal organizations that will not fit into the neatly defined box of “unquestionably provincial” activities defined by the Supreme Court", which could lead to future litigation.
