= Norberg v Wynrib =

- Supreme Court of Canada

Hearing: Judgment:
- Full case name: Laura Norberg v Morris Wynrib
- Citations: [1992] 2 SCR 226
- Docket No.: 21924

Court membership
- Chief Justice: Antonio Lamer; Puisne Justices: Gérard La Forest, Claire L'Heureux-Dubé, John Sopinka, Charles Gonthier, Peter Cory, Beverley McLachlin, William Stevenson, Frank Iacobucci

Reasons given
- Majority: La Forest J

Norberg v Wynrib, [1992] 2 SCR 226 is a leading Supreme Court of Canada decision on the fiduciary duty between doctors and patients, and on the limits of consent as a defence in sexual assault.

== Background ==
Laura Norberg had severe pains in her jaw and frequent headaches in 1978. To remedy this problem, her sister offered her Fiorinal. After the source of her pain, an abscessed tooth, was found and treated, her addiction to painkillers remained. After breaking her ankle in 1981, she found a doctor who would prescribe Fiorinal. After this doctor retired, she sought out another who would provide the drug. Starting in 1982, she began seeing Dr. Wynrib, an elderly physician, and he began giving Norberg Fiorinal under the pretext of an ankle injury. In exchange, Wynrib demanded sexual favours. She eventually brought an action against him for sexual assault.

== Issues ==
There are two main issues in this case. First, the sexual assault falls under the tort of battery. Second, can the relationship between Norberg and Wynrib be characterized as fiduciary and therefore give rise to a fiduciary obligation? The British Columbia Court of Appeal dismissed the case on the basis that she consented. The case was given leave to the Supreme Court. The Women's Legal Education and Action Fund acted as an intervener in this case.

== Decision ==
Writing for the majority, La Forest J found an award of punitive damages on behalf of Norberg, but stops short of recognizing a fiduciary duty. The majority does not believe that sex is a power that can be transferred. Even though the majority discusses consent and its vitiation, they still treat the facts as an exchange between two parties.

Concurring in the result, McLachlin J (as she then was) characterized the duty differently:

The relationship of physician and patient can be conceptualized in a variety of ways. It can be viewed as a creature of contract, with the physician's failure to fulfil his or her obligations giving rise to an action for breach of contract. It undoubtedly gives rise to a duty of care, the breach of which constitutes the tort of negligence. In common with all members of society, the doctor owes the patient a duty not to touch him or her without his or her consent; if the doctor breaches this duty, he or she will have committed the tort of battery. But perhaps the most fundamental characteristic of the doctor-patient relationship is its fiduciary nature. All the authorities agree that the relationship of physician to patient also falls into that special category of relationships which the law calls fiduciary.

== See also ==
- List of Supreme Court of Canada cases (Lamer Court)
- Fiduciary Duty
