= 1984 reasons of the Supreme Court of Canada =

The list below consists of the reasons delivered from the bench by the Supreme Court of Canada during 1984. This list, however, does not include decisions on motions.

== Reasons ==
Delivered the Court's reason
Joined the Court's reason
Filed a concurrence
Joined a concurrence
Filed a dissent
Joined a dissent
Filed a concurrence/dissent
Joined a concurrence/dissent
Did not participate in the judgment
Did not participate in the final disposition of the judgment
Not a member of the Court at the time of hearing or delivering
- Decisions that do not note a Justice delivering the Court's reason are per coram.
- Multiple concurrences and dissents within a case are numbered, with joining votes numbered accordingly. Justices occasionally join multiple reasons in a single case; each vote is subdivided accordingly.
- Multiple unnumbered reasons are jointly written or delivered.
- Decisions that are given orally from the bench are denoted by a "V"; per coram decisions delivered orally from the bench only note a "V" on the most senior justice on the panel.
- An asterisk ( * ) in the Court's opinion denotes that it was only a majority in part or a plurality.

Case name	Argued	Decided	Laskin (Note: died in office on 26 March 1984)	Dickson (Note: appointed Chief Justice on 18 April 1984)	Ritchie	Beetz	Estey	McIntyre	Chouinard	Lamer	Wilson	Le Dain (Note: appointed on 29 May 1984)
Beaudoin-Daigneault v Richard, 1984 CanLII 15, [1984] 1 SCR 2												
Desgagné v Fabrique de la paroisse St-Philippe d'Arvida, 1984 CanLII 129, [1984] 1 SCR 19	17 March 1982	2 February 1984										
R v Isaac, 1984 CanLII 130, [1984] 1 SCR 74	19 October 1983	2 February 1984										
Telecommunications Workers' Union v. British Columbia Ferry Corporation, 1984 CanLII 131, [1984] 1 SCR 83	13 February 1984	13 February 1984			V							
McKibbon v R, 1984 CanLII 67, [1984] 1 SCR 131	18 May 1983	8 March 1984										
Reference re Newfoundland Continental Shelf, 1984 CanLII 132, [1984] 1 SCR 86	22–24 February 1983	8 March 1984										
Droste v R, 1984 CanLII 68, [1984] 1 SCR 208	2 November 1983	2 April 1984										
The Queen v. Ancio, 1984 CanLII 69, [1984] 1 SCR 225	8 November 1983	2 April 1984										
Bibeault v McCaffrey, 1984 CanLII 133, [1984] 1 SCR 176	1 November 1983	2 April 1984										
Brown v Baugh et al, 1984 CanLII 134, [1984] 1 SCR 192	2 February 1984	2 April 1984										
National Bank of Canada v. Retail Clerks' International Union et al, 1984 CanLII 2, [1984] 1 SCR 269	30 November 1984	3 May 1984				(Note: filed additional reasons (joined by Estey, McIntyre, Lamer and Wilson JJ))						
Law Society of Upper Canada v Skapinker, 1984 CanLII 3, [1984] 1 SCR 357	23–24 February 1984	3 May 1984										
Reference re Upper Churchill Water Rights Reversion Act, 1984 CanLII 17, [1984] 1 SCR 297	28 September – 1 October 1982	3 May 1984										
R v Garlow, 1984 CanLII 71, [1984] 1 SCR 386	3 May 1984	3 May 1984			V							
Case name	Argued	Decided	Laskin	Dickson	Ritchie	Beetz	Estey	McIntyre	Chouinard	Lamer	Wilson	Le Dain
Chiasson v The Queen, 1984 CanLII 136, [1984] 1 SCR 266	13 March 1984	3 May 1984										
Hartel Holdings Co Ltd v City of Calgary, CanLII , [1984] 1 SCR 337	28–29 September 1983	3 May 1984										
Farr v Farr, 1984 CanLII 2754, [1984] 1 SCR 252	29–30 November 1983	3 May 1984										
Kane v R, CanLII , [1984] 1 SCR 387	14 May 1984	14 May 1984		V								
Reference re: Ownership of the Bed of the Strait of Georgia and Related Areas, 1984 CanLII 138, [1984] 1 SCR 388	26–28 October 1982	17 May 1984										
Canadian Merchant Service Guild v Gagnon et al, 1984 CanLII 18, [1984] 1 SCR 509	13 March 1984	7 June 1984										
Stubart Investments Ltd v The Queen, 1984 CanLII 20, [1984] 1 SCR 536	23–24 November 1983	7 June 1984										
Langlois v Ministère de la Justice du Québec, 1984 CanLII 139, [1984] 1 SCR 472	14 March 1984	7 June 1984										
R v Wis Development Corporation Ltd et al, 1984 CanLII 140, [1984] 1 SCR 485	13 December 1983	7 June 1984										
Smith v The Queen, 1984 CanLII 141, [1984] 1 SCR 582	7 June 1984	7 June 1984		V								
James Richardson & Sons v M.N.R., 1984 CanLII 1, [1984] 1 SCR 614	11 October 1983	21 June 1984										
Consumers Distributing Co v Seiko, 1984 CanLII 73, [1984] 1 SCR 583	23 November 1983	21 June 1984										
Kamloops v Nielsen, 1984 CanLII 21, [1984] 2 SCR 2	22 November 1982	26 July 1984										
Skogman v The Queen, 1984 CanLII 22, [1984] 2 SCR 93	22 November 1982	26 July 1984										
AG (Que) v. Quebec Protestant School Boards, 1984 CanLII 32, [1984] 2 SCR 66	21–22 February 1984	26 July 1984										
Case name	Argued	Decided	Laskin	Dickson	Ritchie	Beetz	Estey	McIntyre	Chouinard	Lamer	Wilson	Le Dain
Khan v R, 1984 CanLII 74, [1984] 2 SCR 62	19 June 1984	26 July 1984										
Gould v Attorney General of Canada, 1984 CanLII 142, [1984] 2 SCR 124	4 September 1984	4 September 1984		V								
Hunter et al v Southam Inc, 1984 CanLII 33, [1984] 2 SCR 145	22 November 1983	17 September 1984										
Royal Bank of Canada v First Pioneer Investments, 1984 CanLII 75, [1984] 2 SCR 125	9–10 November 1983	17 September 1984										
Maroukis v Maroukis, 1984 CanLII 76, [1984] 2 SCR 137	5 May 1984	17 September 1984										
Ogg-Moss v R, 1984 CanLII 77, [1984] 2 SCR 173	3 November 1983	17 September 1984										
Nixon v R, 1984 CanLII 78, [1984] 2 SCR 197	3 November 1983	17 September 1984										
Phoenix Assurance v Bird Construction, 1984 CanLII 79, [1984] 2 SCR 199	15 June 1983	17 September 1984										
Perka v The Queen, 1984 CanLII 23, [1984] 2 SCR 232	31 January – 1 February 1984	11 October 1984										
Ken Gordon Excavating v Edstan Construction, 1984 CanLII 80, [1984] 2 SCR 280	16–17 May 1984	11 October 1984										
Miller v Miller, 1984 CanLII 81, [1984] 2 SCR 310	3 October 1984	11 October 1984										
Wildman v R, 1984 CanLII 82, [1984] 2 SCR 311	2 May 1984	11 October 1984										
R v Brese, CanLII , [1984] 2 SCR 333	31 October 1984	31 October 1984		V								
Guerin v The Queen, 1984 CanLII 25, [1984] 2 SCR 335	13–14 June 1983	1 November 1984										
Reilly v. R, 1984 CanLII 83, [1984] 2 SCR 396	2 November 1983	1 November 1984										
Case name	Argued	Decided	Laskin	Dickson	Ritchie	Beetz	Estey	McIntyre	Chouinard	Lamer	Wilson	Le Dain
Osborne v The Queen, 1984 CanLII 119, [1984] 2 SCR 406	1 November 1984	1 November 1984					V					
Syndicat des employés de production du Québec v CLRB, 1984 CanLII 26, [1984] 2 SCR 412	1–2 February 1983	22 November 1984										
Blanchard v Control Data Canada Ltd, 1984 CanLII 27, [1984] 2 SCR 476	15 March 1984	22 November 1984										
Cardinal v The Queen, 1984 CanLII 112, [1984] 2 SCR 523	22 November 1984	22 November 1984		V								
Radulesco v Canadian Human Rights Commission, 1984 CanLII 120, [1984] 2 SCR 407	23 October 1984	22 November 1984										
British Columbia Development Corporation v Friedmann (Ombudsman), 1984 CanLII 121, [1984] 2 SCR 447	30 January 1984	22 November 1984										
Attorney General of Quebec v Udeco Inc et al, 1984 CanLII 122, [1984] 2 SCR 502	23–24 May 1984	22 November 1984										
R v Sophonow, 1984 CanLII 124, [1984] 2 SCR 524	10 December 1984	10 December 1984		V								
Goldwax v Montréal (City of), 1984 CanLII 125, [1984] 2 SCR 525	12 December 1984	12 December 1984		V								
Nadeau v The Queen, 1984 CanLII 28, [1984] 2 SCR 570	21 November 1984	13 December 1984										
Abbas v R, 1984 CanLII 84, [1984] 2 SCR 526	5 June 1984	13 December 1984										
Attorney General (Ontario) v Fatehi, 1984 CanLII 85, [1984] 2 SCR 536	22 June 1984	13 December 1984										
Duhamel v The Queen, 1984 CanLII 126, [1984] 2 SCR 555	2 February 1984	13 December 1984										
Minister of Employment and Immigration et al v Jiminez-Perez et al, 1984 CanLII 127, [1984] 2 SCR 565	21–22 November 1984	13 December 1984										
AG (Que) v Greater Hull School Board, 1984 CanLII 29, [1984] 2 SCR 575	20–21 June 1984	20 December 1984										
Case name	Argued	Decided	Laskin	Dickson	Ritchie	Beetz	Estey	McIntyre	Chouinard	Lamer	Wilson	Le Dain
Lyons v The Queen, 1984 CanLII 30, [1984] 2 SCR 633	23 June 1984	20 December 1984										
Wiretap Reference, 1984 CanLII 31, [1984] 2 SCR 697	26–27 March 1984	20 December 1984										
Caldwell et al v Stuart et al, 1984 CanLII 128, [1984] 2 SCR 603	15–16 February 1984	20 December 1984										
