= 2006 reasons of the Supreme Court of Canada =

The table below lists the reasons delivered from the bench by the Supreme Court of Canada during 2006. A total of 59 judgments were published. The table illustrates what reasons were filed by each justice in each case, and which justices joined each reason. This list, however, does not include reasons on motions.

The Globe and Mail remarked that this year was the lowest number of judgments released in at least 25 years. It was noted that this appears to be a part of a similar trend seen in the US Supreme Court and House of Lords.

== Reasons ==
Delivered the Court's reason
Joined the Court's reason
Filed a concurrence
Joined a concurrence
Filed a dissent
Joined a dissent
Filed a concurrence/dissent
Joined a concurrence/dissent
Did not participate in the judgment
Did not participate in the final disposition of the judgment
Not a member of the Court at the time of hearing or delivering
- Decisions that do not note a Justice delivering the Court's reason are per coram.
- Multiple concurrences and dissents within a case are numbered, with joining votes numbered accordingly. Justices occasionally join multiple reasons in a single case; each vote is subdivided accordingly.
- Multiple unnumbered reasons are jointly written or delivered.
- Decisions that are given orally from the bench are denoted by a "V"; per coram decisions delivered orally from the bench only note a "V" on the most senior justice on the panel.
- An asterisk ( * ) in the Court's opinion denotes that it was only a majority in part or a plurality.

| Case name | Argued | Decided | McLachlin | Bastarache | Binnie | LeBel | Deschamps | Fish | Abella | Charron | Rothstein |
|---|---|---|---|---|---|---|---|---|---|---|---|
| Canada (Human Rights Commission) v Canadian Airlines International Ltd, [2006] 1 S.C.R. 3; 2006 SCC 1 | October 19, 2005 | January 26, 2006 | | | | | | | | | |
| Isidore Garon ltée v Tremblay; Fillion et Frères (1976) inc v Syndicat national des employés de garage du Québec inc, [2006] 1 S.C.R. 27; 2006 SCC 2 | February 16, 2005 | January 27, 2006 | | | | | X | | | | |
| Young v Bella, [2006] 1 S.C.R. 108; 2006 SCC 3 | October 20, 2005 | January 27, 2006 | X | | X | | | | | | |
| ATCO Gas & Pipelines Ltd v Alberta (Energy & Utilities Board), [2006] 1 S.C.R. 140; 2006 SCC 4 | May 11, 2005 | February 9, 2006 | | x | | | | | | | |
| Canadian Pacific Railway Co v Vancouver (City), 1 S.C.R. _; 2006 SCC 5 | November 9, 2005 | February 23, 2006 | | | | | | | | | |
| Multani v Commission scolaire Marguerite-Bourgeoys, 1 S.C.R. _; 2006 SCC 6 | April 12, 2005 | March 2, 2006 | | | | 2 | 1 | | 1 | X | |
| Mazzei v British Columbia (Director of Adult Forensic Psychiatric Services), 1 S.C.R. _; 2006 SCC 7 | November 14, 2005 | March 16, 2006 | | X | | | | | | | |
| R v Pittiman, 1 S.C.R.; 2006 SCC 9 | February 10, 2006 | March 23, 2006 | | | | | | | | | |
| R v Lavigne, 1 S.C.R. _; 2006 SCC 10 | December 8, 2005 | March 30, 2006 | | | | | X | | | | |
| R v Chaisson, 1 S.C.R. _; 2006 SCC 11 | March 15, 2005 | March 30, 2006 | | | | | | X | | | |
| Case name | Argued | Decided | McLachlin | Bastarache | Binnie | LeBel | Deschamps | Fish | Abella | Charron | Rothstein |
| Lévis (City) v Tétreault; Lévis (City) v 2629-4470 Québec inc, 1 S.C.R. _; 2006 SCC 12 | October 21, 2005 | April 13, 2006 | | | | X | | | | | |
| HJ Heinz Co of Canada Ltd v Canada (AG), 1 S.C.R. _; 2006 SCC 13 | November 7, 2005 | April 21, 2006 | | | | | | | | | |
| Tranchemontagne v Ontario (Director, Disability Support Program), 1 S.C.R. _; 2006 SCC 14 | December 12, 2005 | April 21, 2006 | | X | | | | | | | |
| R v Rodgers, 1 S.C.R. _; 2006 SCC 15 | November 15, 2005 | April 27, 2006 | | | | | | | | x | |
| R v Graveline, 1 S.C.R. _; 2006 SCC 16 | March 14, 2006 | April 27, 2006 | | | | | | X | | | |
| R v Gagnon, _ S.C.R. _; 2006 SCC 17 | March 16, 2006 | May 4, 2006 | | X | | | | | X | | |
| Childs v Desormeaux, _ S.C.R. _; 2006 SCC 18 | January 18, 2006 | May 5, 2006 | | | | | | | | | |
| Bisaillon v Concordia University, _ S.C.R. _; 2006 SCC 19 | December 14, 2005 | May 18, 2006 | | | | X | | | | | |
| Placer Dome Canada Ltd v Ontario (Minister of Finance), _ S.C.R. _; 2006 SCC 20 | November 17, 2005 | May 25, 2006 | | | | X | | | | | |
| Jesuit Fathers of Upper Canada v Guardian Insurance Co of Canada, _ S.C.R. _; 2006 SCC 21 | January 10, 2006 | June 1, 2006 | | | | | | | | | |
| Case name | Argued | Decided | McLachlin | Bastarache | Binnie | LeBel | Deschamps | Fish | Abella | Charron | Rothstein |
| Mattel, Inc v 3894207 Canada Inc, _ S.C.R. _; 2006 SCC 22 | October 18, 2005 | June 2, 2006 | | | | | | | | | |
| Veuve Clicquot Ponsardin v Boutiques Cliquot Ltée, _ S.C.R. _; 2006 SCC 23 | October 18, 2005 | June 2, 2006 | | | | | | | | | |
| Canada 3000 Inc, Re; Inter‑Canadian (1991) Inc (Trustee of), _ S.C.R. _; 2006 SCC 24 | January 16, 17, 2006 | June 9, 2006 | | | x | | | | | | |
| Leskun v Leskun, _ S.C.R. _; 2006 SCC 25 | February 15, 2006 | June 21, 2006 | | | | | | | | | |
| R v BWP; R v BVN, 2006 SCC 27 | November 10, 2005 | June 22, 2006 | | | | | | | | | |
| Buschau v Rogers Communications Inc, 2006 SCC 28 | November 15, 2005 | June 22, 2006 | | | | | X | | | | |
| Fidler v Sun Life Assurance Co of Canada, 2006 SCC 30 | December 6, 2005 | June 29, 2006 | | | | | | | x | | |
| Goodis v Ontario (Ministry of Correctional Services), 2006 SCC 31 | April 18, 2006 | July 7, 2006 | | | | | | | | | X |
| R v Boulanger, 2006 SCC 32 | April 18, 2006 | July 13, 2006 | X | | | | | | | | |
| United States of America v Ferras; United States of America v Latty, 2006 SCC 33 | October 17, 2005 | July 21, 2006 | | | | | | | | | |
| Case name | Argued | Decided | McLachlin | Bastarache | Binnie | LeBel | Deschamps | Fish | Abella | Charron | Rothstein |
| United Mexican States v Ortega; United States of America v Fiessel, 2006 SCC 34 | March 23, 2006 | July 21, 2006 | X | | | | | | | | |
| GMAC Commercial Credit Corporation - Canada v TCT Logistics Inc, 2006 SCC 35 | November 16, 2005 | July 27, 2006 | | | | | | | x | | |
| Celanese Canada Inc v Murray Demolition Corp, 2006 SCC 36 | December 12, 2005 | July 27, 2006 | | | X | | | | | | |
| DBS v SRG; LJW v TAR; Henry v Henry; Hiemstra v Hiemstra, 2006 SCC 37 | February 13, 2006 | July 31, 2006 | | x | | | | | | | |
| Blank v Canada (Minister of Justice), 2006 SCC 39 | December 13, 2005 | September 8, 2006 | | | | | | | | | |
| R v Kong, 2006 SCC 40 | June 22, 2006 | September 8, 2006 | | X/R | | | | | | | |
| Isen v Simms, 2006 SCC 41 | June 21, 2006 | October 5, 2006 | | | | | | | | | X |
| R v Hazout, 2006 SCC 42 | June 22, 2006 | October 5, 2006 | | | | | | | | | |
| Robertson v Thomson Corp, 2006 SCC 43 | Dec. 6, 2005/Apr. 18, 2006 | October 12, 2006 | | | | x | | x | | | |
| R v Shoker, 2006 SCC 44 | February 14, 2006 | October 13, 2006 | | | | | | | | | |
| Case name | Argued | Decided | McLachlin | Bastarache | Binnie | LeBel | Deschamps | Fish | Abella | Charron | Rothstein |
| Walker v Ritchie, 2006 SCC 45 | May 10, 2006 | October 13, 2006 | | | | | | | | | X |
| Imperial Oil Ltd v Canada; Inco Ltd v Canada, 2006 SCC 46 | February 7, 2006 | October 20, 2006 | | | | X | | | | | |
| R v Krieger, 2006 SCC 47 | January 12, 2006 | October 26, 2006 | | | | | | X | | | |
| Pharmascience Inc v Binet, 2006 SCC 48 | May 9, 2006 | October 26, 2006 | | | | X | | | | | |
| AstraZeneca Canada Inc v Canada (Minister of Health), 2006 SCC 49 | May 11, 2006 | November 3, 2006 | | | X | | | | | | |
| Fédération des producteurs acéricoles du Québec v Regroupement pour la commercialisation des produits de l'érable inc, 2006 SCC 50 | June 19, 2006 | November 9, 2006 | | | | | | | | | |
| Pro Swing Inc v Elta Golf Inc, 2006 SCC 52 | December 5, 2005 | November 17, 2006 | | | | | | | | | |
| R v Déry, 2006 SCC 53 | February 16, 2006 | November 23, 2006 | | | | | | X | | | |
| R v Sappier; R v Gray, 2006 SCC 54 | May 17, 2006 | December 7, 2006 | | | | | | | | | |
| R v Angelillo, 2006 SCC 55 | December 8, 2005 | December 8, 2006 | | | | | | | | | |
| Case name | Argued | Decided | McLachlin | Bastarache | Binnie | LeBel | Deschamps | Fish | Abella | Charron | Rothstein |
| R v Larche, 2006 SCC 56 | November 8, 2005 | December 8, 2006 | | | | | | | | | |
| R v Khelawon, 2006 SCC 57 | December 16, 2005 | December 14, 2006 | | | | | | | | | |
| McDiarmid Lumber Ltd v God's Lake First Nation, 2006 SCC 58 | April 20, 2006 | December 15, 2006 | | | | | | | | | |
| R v Morris, 2006 SCC 59 | October 14, 2005 | December 21, 2006 | | | | | X | | X | | |

== Justices of the Supreme Court ==
| Justice | Reasons written | Votes cast | % Majority |
|---|---|---|---|
| Chief Justice Beverley McLachlin | 8 / 0 / 0 / 2 / Total=10 | 32 / 1 / 1 / 4 / Total=38 | 41 of 48 |
| Puisne Justice Michel Bastarache | 7 / 2 / 0 / 2 / Total=11 | 34 / 1 / 0 / 2 / Total=37 | 44 of 48 |
| Puisne Justice Ian Binnie | 7 / 1 / 0 / 3 / Total=11 | 33 / 1 / 1 / 2 / Total=37 | 42 of 48 |
| Puisne Justice Louis LeBel | 8 / 3 / 0 / 2 / Total=13 | 32 / 0 / 0 / 2 / Total=34 | 43 of 47 |
| Pusine Justice Marie Deschamps | 7 / 1 / 0 / 2 / Total=10 | 33 / 0 / 0 / 2 / Total=35 | 41 of 45 |
| Puisne Justice Morris Fish | 8 / 1 / 0 / 3 / Total=12 | 39 / 2 / 0 / 5 / Total=46 | 50 of 58 |
| Pusine Justice Rosalie Abella | 5 / 2 / 1 / 2 / Total=10 | 37 / 0 / 0 / 1 / Total=38 | 44 of 48 |
| Pusine Justice Louise Charron | 7 / 0 / 0 / 0 / Total=07 | 35 / 3 / 1 / 2 / Total=41 | 45 of 48 |
| Pusine Justice Marshall Rothstein (began March 1, 2006) | 3 / 0 / 0 / 0 / Total=03 | 7 / 0 / 0 / 0 / Total=07 | 10 of 10 (100%) |
Notes on statistics: A justice is only included in the majority if they have joined or concurred in the Court's judgment in full. Percentages are based only on the cases in which a justice participated, and are rounded to the nearest tenth of a percent.
