= 1986 reasons of the Supreme Court of Canada =

The list below consists of the reasons delivered from the bench by the Supreme Court of Canada during 1986. This list, however, does not include decisions on motions.

== Reasons ==
Delivered the Court's reason
Joined the Court's reason
Filed a concurrence
Joined a concurrence
Filed a dissent
Joined a dissent
Filed a concurrence/dissent
Joined a concurrence/dissent
Did not participate in the judgment
Did not participate in the final disposition of the judgment
Not a member of the Court at the time of hearing or delivering
- Decisions that do not note a Justice delivering the Court's reason are per coram.
- Multiple concurrences and dissents within a case are numbered, with joining votes numbered accordingly. Justices occasionally join multiple reasons in a single case; each vote is subdivided accordingly.
- Multiple unnumbered reasons are jointly written or delivered.
- Decisions that are given orally from the bench are denoted by a "V"; per coram decisions delivered orally from the bench only note a "V" on the most senior justice on the panel.
- An asterisk ( * ) in the Court's opinion denotes that it was only a majority in part or a plurality.

Case name	Argued	Decided	Dickson	Beetz	Estey	McIntyre	Chouinard	Lamer	Wilson	Le Dain	La Forest
Morozuk v. The Queen, [1986] 1 SCR 31	May 2, 3, 1985	January 30, 1986									
Martin v. Perrie, [1986] 1 SCR 41	October 31, 1985	January 30, 1986									
Vézina and Côté v. The Queen, [1986] 1 SCR 2	December 12, 1984	January 30, 1986									
City of Brossard v. Pelletier, [1986] 1 SCR 53	February 5, 1986	February 5, 1986									
Bellerose v. A.G. of Quebec, [1986] 1 SCR 55	February 26, 1986	February 26, 1986									
Hillis Oil & Sales v. Wynn's Canada, [1986] 1 SCR 57	November 2, 1984	February 28, 1986									
H.W. Liebig Co. v. Leading Investments Ltd., [1986] 1 SCR 70	February 14, 15, 1985	February 28, 1986									
R. v. Oakes, [1986] 1 SCR 103	March 12, 1985	February 28, 1986									
Cook v. The Queen, [1986] 1 SCR 144	February 28, 1986	February 28, 1986									
R. v. Landry, [1986] 1 SCR 145	March 15, 1985	February 28, 1986									
Bell Canada v. Consumers' Assoc. of Canada, [1986] 1 SCR 190	April 25, 1985	February 28, 1986									
The Queen v. Golden et al., [1986] 1 SCR 209	May 2, 1985	February 28, 1986									
Nelles v. The Queen		February 28, 1986									
B.D.C. Ltd. v. Hofstrand Farms Ltd., [1986] 1 SCR 228	February 2, 1984	March 20, 1986									
Daoust v. The Queen, [1986] 1 SCR 248	February 26, 1986	March 20, 1986									
Case name	Argued	Decided	Dickson	Beetz	Estey	McIntyre	Chouinard	Lamer	Wilson	Le Dain	La Forest
Di Pietro et al. v. The Queen, [1986] 1 SCR 250	December 21, 1984	March 20, 1986									
Gagnon v. The Queen, [1986] 1 SCR 264	December 19, 1984	March 27, 1986									
The Queen v. Valois, [1986] 1 SCR 278	May 23, 1985	March 27, 1986									
Derrickson v. Derrickson, [1986] 1 SCR 285	November 6, 7, 1985	March 27, 1986									
Paul v. Paul, [1986] 1 SCR 306	November 7, 1985	March 27, 1986									
R. v. Hill, [1986] 1 SCR 313	February 21, 1985	April 24, 1986									
Guillemette v. The Queen, [1986] 1 SCR 356	October 29, 1985	April 24, 1986									
Dubois v. The Queen, [1986] 1 SCR 366	March 14, 1985	April 24, 1986									
Clarkson v. The Queen, [1986] 1 SCR 383	May 16, 1985	April 24, 1986									
Gendron v. Municipalité de la Baie-James, [1986] 1 SCR 401	December 11, 12, 1985	April 24, 1986									
Fleming (Gombosh Estate) v. The Queen, [1986] 1 SCR 415	November 20, 1985	April 24, 1986									
Montreal (City of) v. Steckler, [1986] 2 SCR 571	April 28, 29, 1986 rehearing: November 4, 1986	April 29, 1986									
Bilodeau v. A.G. (Man.), [1986] 1 SCR 449	June 13, 1984	May 1, 1986									
MacDonald v. City of Montreal, [1986] 1 SCR 460	December 18, 19, 1984	May 1, 1986									
Société des Acadiens v. Association of Parents, [1986] 1 SCR 549	December 4, 5, 1984	May 1, 1986									
Case name	Argued	Decided	Dickson	Beetz	Estey	McIntyre	Chouinard	Lamer	Wilson	Le Dain	La Forest
Dube v. Labar, [1986] 1 SCR 649	January 31, 1985	May 1, 1986									
Hawkshaw v. The Queen, [1986] 1 SCR 668	January 28, 1985	May 22, 1986									
Canadian Pacific Ltd. v. A.G. (Can.), [1986] 1 SCR 678	January 30, 1986	May 22, 1986									
Farquharson v. The Queen, [1986] 1 SCR 703	May 1, 1986	May 22, 1986									
A.G. (Que.) v. Expropriation Tribunal, [1986] 1 SCR 732, 1986 CanLII 13 (SCC) 1986-06-12	February 4, 1986	June 12, 1986									
Nelson and others v. C.T.C. Mortgage Corp., [1986] 1 SCR 749	May 22, 1986	June 12, 1986									
St. Anne Nackawic Pulp & Paper v. CPU, [1986] 1 SCR 704, 1986 CanLII 71 (SCC) 1986-06-12	December 10, 1984	June 12, 1986									
Boucher v. The Queen, [1986] 1 SCR 750	June 19, 1986	June 19, 1986									
Mezzo v. The Queen, [1986] 1 SCR 802	February 20, 1985	June 26, 1986									
Mills v. The Queen, [1986] 1 SCR 863	June 6, 7, 1984 rehearing: October 9, 1985	June 26, 1986									
Carter v. The Queen, [1986] 1 SCR 981	April 24, 1985	June 26, 1986									
Nero v. Rygus, [1986] 1 SCR 989	June 16, 1986	June 26, 1986									
Canning v. The Queen, [1986] 1 SCR 991	June 18, 1986	June 26, 1986									
ITO-Int'l Terminal Operators v. Miida Electronics, [1986] 1 SCR 752	October 2, 3, 1984	June 26, 1986									
Deutsch v. The Queen, [1986] 2 SCR 2	January 31, 1985	July 31, 1986									
Case name	Argued	Decided	Dickson	Beetz	Estey	McIntyre	Chouinard	Lamer	Wilson	Le Dain	La Forest
Chambers v. The Queen, [1986] 2 SCR 29	October 2, 1985	July 31, 1986									
Sorochan v. Sorochan, [1986] 2 SCR 38	June 26, 1986	July 31, 1986									
The Queen v. Beauregard, [1986] 2 SCR 56	October 4, 1985	September 16, 1986									
Kirkpatrick v. Maple Ridge, [1986] 2 SCR 124	November 21, 1985	September 16, 1986									
R. v. Clermont, [1986] 2 SCR 131	March 18, 1986	September 16, 1986									
Wile v. Cook, [1986] 2 SCR 137	June 25, 1986	September 16, 1986									
Joe v. Canada, [1986] 2 SCR 145	October 2, 1986	October 2, 1986									
Central Trust Co. v. Rafuse, [1986] 2 SCR 147	December 6, 1984	October 9, 1986									
Scowby v. Glendinning, [1986] 2 SCR 226	February 19, 1985	October 9, 1986									
R. v. Mannion, [1986] 2 SCR 272	June 6, 1985	October 9, 1986									
R. v. Jones, [1986] 2 SCR 284	November 19, 1985	October 9, 1986									
Construction Industry Commission v. M.U.C.T.C., [1986] 2 SCR 327	February 28, 1986	October 9, 1986									
Royal Trust v. Potash, [1986] 2 SCR 351	April 24, 1986	October 9, 1986									
R. v. Campbell, [1986] 2 SCR 376	April 28, 1986	October 9, 1986									
E. (Mrs.) v. Eve, [1986] 2 SCR 388, 1986 CanLII 36 (SCC) 1986-10-23	June 4, 5, 1985	October 23, 1986									
Case name	Argued	Decided	Dickson	Beetz	Estey	McIntyre	Chouinard	Lamer	Wilson	Le Dain	La Forest
Canada (Attorney General) v. Valois, [1986] 2 SCR 439	May 2, 1986	October 23, 1986									
Re City of Oshawa and 505191 Ontario Ltd.		October 23, 1986									
Dumas v. Leclerc Institute, [1986] 2 SCR 459	May 24, 1985	November 6, 1986									
R. v. Krause, [1986] 2 SCR 466	November 20, 1985	November 6, 1986									
R. v. Prince, [1986] 2 SCR 480	April 23, 1986	November 6, 1986									
Ensite Ltd. v. R., [1986] 2 SCR 509	May 21, 1986	November 6, 1986									
Canadian Marconi v. R., [1986] 2 SCR 522	May 21, 22, 1986	November 6, 1986									
Air Canada v. B.C. (A.G.), [1986] 2 SCR 539	November 4, 1985	November 27, 1986									
Bank of Montreal v. Wilder, [1986] 2 SCR 551	November 5, 1985	November 27, 1986									
RWDSU v. Dolphin Delivery Ltd., [1986] 2 SCR 573	December 6, 7, 1984	December 18, 1986									
Finlay v. Canada (Minister of Finance), [1986] 2 SCR 607	February 22, 1985	December 18, 1986									
Carey v. Ontario, [1986] 2 SCR 637	October 2, 1985	December 18, 1986									
Head v. The Queen, [1986] 2 SCR 684	March 26, 1986	December 18, 1986									
Giouroukos v. Cadillac Fairview Corp., [1986] 2 SCR 707	November 28, 1986	December 18, 1986									
R. v. Nehring, [1986] 2 SCR 709	December 12, 1986	December 18, 1986									
Case name	Argued	Decided	Dickson	Beetz	Estey	McIntyre	Chouinard	Lamer	Wilson	Le Dain	La Forest
Canadian National Transportation Ltd. v. Alberta Provincial Court, [1986] 2 SCR 711	December 18, 1986	December 18, 1986									
R. v. Edwards Books and Art Ltd., [1986] 2 SCR 713	March 4, 5, 6, 1986	December 18, 1986									
