= List of Canadian royal commissions =

This is a list of Canadian royal commissions or commissions of inquiry since Confederation.

In Canada, royal commissions and commissions of inquiry are official inquiries into matters of national concern, either in order to look into an important general issue or to fully investigate a specific incident. They are appointed by the governor-in-Council (Cabinet), according to the Inquiries Act, by an order-in-Council that includes the names of the commissioners, the terms of reference, and the body's powers; commissions are often referred to informally by the name of the chairperson or commissioner(s), such as the "Gomery Inquiry", a commission headed by John Gomery. The findings are reported to Cabinet for appropriate action; while these are non-binding, many have a significant impact on public opinion and the shape of public policy.

The Crown in right of each province can also appoint a royal commission. Federal inquiries are limited to matters within the constitutional jurisdiction of the Parliament of Canada; they can only look at issues within provincial jurisdiction that are connected to federal jurisdiction, such as policing on-reserve, child welfare on-reserve, etcetera. Other types of federal public inquiries include task forces and departmental investigations.

Since the 1960s, royal commissions have tended to be reserved for broad topics, whereas commissions of inquiry have more focused. From 1867 to 2013, there have been almost 450 federal commissions of inquiry, with and without the royal title; more than 1,500 departmental investigations; and an undetermined number of task forces.

== Overview ==
An inquiry called by the federal government into matters of national concern are known in Canada as royal commissions or commissions of inquiry. These consist of a panel of distinguished individuals, experts, or judges convened by the governor-in-Council (the governor general acting on the advice of Cabinet) to look into and secure advice for an issue of general importance or to fully investigate a specific contentious incident. The same order-in-Council forming the commission will also set out the terms of reference for, and powers of, the commission. This is done according to the Inquiries Act, which was first passed by the Parliament of Canada in 1868 and provides royal commissions, commissions of inquiry, task forces, and departmental investigations the power to conduct investigations by subpoenaing witnesses, taking evidence under oath, requisitioning documents, and hiring expert staff.

Once the commission's task is complete, its findings are reported to Cabinet for appropriate action. While a commission's findings and recommendations are non-binding, many have a significant impact on public opinion and the shape of public policy.

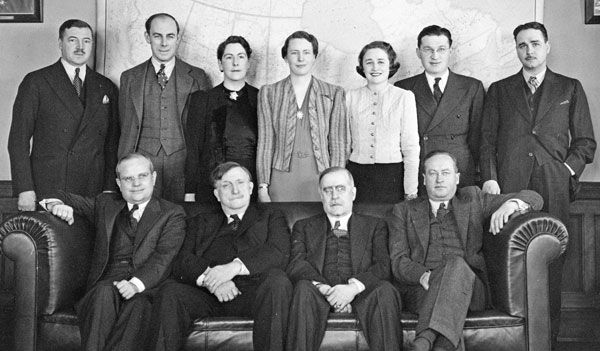
Members of the Royal Commission on Dominion–Provincial Relations, 1938

In practice, royal commissions can be seen as commissions of inquiry under the Great Seal of Canada that carry a royal title; though, apart from this distinction, there is no effective difference between the two. Royal commissions tend to be thought of as broader in scope than other public inquiries, often holding nationwide public hearings and publishing associated research reports, as well as their formal findings and recommendations.

There are several different kinds of commissions of inquiry, which can be established under either Part I or Part II of the Inquiries Act, or any one of 87 or more federal statutes. The mandate of a commission of inquiry depends on the nature of the issue to be considered. Advisory commissions usually have a broad mandate in order to ensure that commissioners consider all options and consult all parties with an interest in the matter, whereas investigative commissions typically have a more specific, focused mandate. Commissions of inquiry created under Part I of the Inquiries Act are considered to government departments for the purposes of the Financial Administration Act (FAA). Oftentimes, the prime minister is given responsibility for the commission for the purposes of the FAA, thus enabling the commission to receive administrative support from the Privy Council Office.

Other types of public inquiry in Canada that are closely related to royal commissions include task forces, which are normally composed of knowledgeable practitioners appointed by government departments to conduct concentrated investigations into specific practical matters. In the past, they have been assigned to look into such matters as privacy and computers, immigration procedures, retirement income policy, labour market development, fisheries policy, and sports. Though usually not as wide-ranging as royal commissions, some task forces have dealt with broad issues, such as housing and urban development, government information, and the structure and foreign ownership of Canadian industry. There are also departmental investigations, which can be established by departments and other agencies under statutory powers of the Inquiries Act.

Federal inquiries are limited to matters within the constitutional jurisdiction of the Parliament of Canada. They can only look at issues within provincial jurisdiction that are connected to federal jurisdiction, such as policing on-reserve, child welfare on-reserve, etcetera. The Crown in right of each province can also appoint a royal commission, although, they are not included in this list.

== Royal commissions ==
| Period | Commission name | Nickname | Commissioner/chair |
|---|---|---|---|
| 1868-1870 | Commission to Inquire into the Present State and Probable Requirements of the Civil Service | Civil Service Commission | John Langton |
| 1869-1870 | Royal Commission to Inquire into the Cause and Nature of the Obstruction Offered in the North-West Territories to the Peaceable Ingress of the Honourable William McDougall | | Donald Alexander Smith |
| 1870 | Commission to Inquire into the State of the Laws Connected with the Administration of Justice in Rupert's Land and the North-West Territories | | Francis Godschall Johnson |
| 1870 | Royal Commission to Inquire into the Best Means for the Improvement of the Water Communications of the Dominion and the Development of the Trade with the North-Eastern Portion of North America | Canal Commission | Hugh Allan |
| 1873 | Royal Commission Relating to Canadian Pacific Railway | | Charles Dewey Day, Antoine Polette and James Robert Gowan |
| 1873 | Royal Commission to Inquire Into and Report Upon Claims to Rights of Cutting Hay and Common in the Province of Manitoba | | John Farquhar Bain and Joseph Dubuc |
| 1873-1874 | Royal Commission to Inquire Into the Cause of the High Springs Floods Which Occur in the St. Lawrence River between the Cities of Quebec and Montreal | | John Dickinson |
| 1874-1875 | Royal Commission on Prohibitory Liquor Law | | F. Davis |
| 1876-1878 | Royal Commission to Inquire Into Conflicting Claims of Lands of Occupants in Manitoba | | Alexander Morris |
| 1879-1880 | Royal Commission to Inquire Into Changes Affecting the Administration of Justice in the North-West Territories | | Edgar Dewdney |
| 1880-1882 | Royal Commission to Inquire Into Matters Connected with the Canadian Pacific Railway | Canadian Pacific Railway Royal Commission | George McKenzie Clark |
| 1880-1882 | Royal Commission to Inquire into the Organization of the Civil Service Commission | | Donald McInnes |
| 1882-1884 | Royal Commission to Inquire Into Certain Claims Connected with the Construction of the Intercolonial Railway | | George McKenzie Clark |
| 1885 | Royal Commission on Chinese Immigration | | Joseph Adolphe Chapleau and John Hamilton Gray |
| 1885 | Royal Commission to Inquire Into the Enumeration of Half-Breeds in the North-West Territories | | William Purvis Rochfort Street |
| 1886-1887 | Royal Commission into Claims for Compensation for Loss or Damage Arising Out of the Late Half-breed and Indian Insurrection in the North-West Territories | | J. Alphonse Ouimet |
| 1886-1887 | Royal Commission on the Leasing of Water-Power on the Lachine Canal | | Etienne H. Parent |
| 1886-1887 | Royal Commission to Inquire into and Report upon the Enumeration of Half-Breeds in the North-West Territories Outside of Manitoba | | Roger Goulet |
| 1886-1888 | Royal Commission on Railways | | Alexander Tilloch Galt |
| 1886-1889 | Royal Commission on the Relations of Labour and Capital | | James S. Armstrong (1886–88) and Augustus Toplady Freed (1888–89) |
| 1891-1892 | Royal Commission on Civil Service | | George Hague |
| 1892 | Royal Commission in Reference to Certain Charges Made Against the Honourable Sir. A.P. Caron, K.C.M.G. | | Adolphe Basile Routhier and Melbourne McTaggart Tait |
| 1895 | Royal Commission on the Liquor Traffic in Canada | | Joseph Hickson |
| 1898-1899 | Royal Commission on Lobster Industry | | Edward Ernest Prince |
| 1899-1900 | Royal Commission on the Shipment and Transportation of Grain | | Albert Elswood Richards and Edmund John Senkler |
| 1900-1902 | Royal Commission on Chinese and Japanese Immigration | | Roger Conger Clute |
| 1901 | Royal Commission to Investigate Charges Made Against Grain Inspectors at Montreal | | David Horn |
| 1902-1903 | Royal Commission on the Tobacco Trade | | Duncan Byron MacTavish |
| 1903 | Royal Commission to Investigate Industrial Disputes in the Province of British Columbia | | Gordon Hunter |
| 1903-1906 | Royal Commission on Transportation | | Robert Redford |
| 1904-1905 | Royal Commission on Italian Immigration | | John Winchester |
| 1904-1905 | Royal Commission to Investigate Alleged Employment of Aliens in Connection with the Surveys of the Proposed Grand Trunk Pacific Railway | | John Winchester |
| 1905 | Royal Commission to Investigate Alleged Employment of Aliens by the Père Marquette Railway Company in Canada | | John Winchester |
| 1906-1907 | Royal Commission on Life Insurance | | Duncan Byron MacTavish |
| 1906-1908 | Royal Commission on the Grain Trade of Canada | | John Millar |
| 1907 | Royal Commission on a Dispute Respecting Hours of Employment Between the Bell Telephone Company of Canada, Ltd., and Operators at Toronto, Ont. | | William Lyon Mackenzie King |
| 1907-1908 | Royal Commission Appointed to Investigate Methods by Which Oriental Labourers Have Been Induced to Come to Canada | | William Lyon Mackenzie King |
| 1907-1908 | Royal Commission on the Civil Service | | John Mortimer Courtney |
| 1907-1908 | Royal Commission on the Quebec Bridge Inquiry | | Henry Holgate |
| 1907-1908 | Royal Commission Regarding Losses Sustained by the Japanese Population of Vancouver, British Columbia, on the Occasion of the Riots in that City in September, 1907 | | William Lyon Mackenzie King |
| 1908 | Royal Commission to Investigate Losses by the Chinese Population of Vancouver, British Columbia, on the Occasion of the Riots in That City in September, 1907 | | William Lyon Mackenzie King |
| 1908-1909 | Royal Commission on Cotton Factories Industrial Disputes | | William Lyon Mackenzie King |
| 1910-1913 | Royal Commission on Industrial Training and Technical Education | | James Wilson Robertson |
| 1912 | Royal Commission of Inquiry in the Matter of the Farmers' Bank of Canada | | William Ralph Meredith |
| 1912-1913 | Royal Commission on Weighing of Butter and Cheese | | Robert Alexander Pringle |
| 1912-1914 | Royal Commission on the Records of the Public Departments | | Joseph Pope |
| 1913 | Royal Commission to Investigate Coal-Mining Disputes on Vancouver Island | | Samuel Price |
| 1913-1914 | Royal Commission to Investigate the State and Management of the Kingston Penitentiary | | George Milnes Macdonnell |
| 1913-1916 | Royal Commission on Indian Affairs | The McKenna–McBride Commission | Nathaniel Whitworth White |
| 1914-18 | Royal Commission on Georgian Bay Canal | | William Sanford Evans |
| 1915-1917 | Royal Commission to Inquire into the Purchase by and on Behalf of the Government of the Dominion of Canada, of Arms, Munitions, Implements, Materials, Horses, Supplies, and other things for the Purchase of the Present Warmission Concerning Purchase of War Supplies and Sale of Small Arms Ammunition | | Charles Peers Davidson |
| 1916 | Royal Commission Appointed to Inquire Into Certain Contracts Made by the Shell Committee | | William Ralph Meredith |
| 1916 | Royal Commission re Parliament Buildings Fire at Ottawa, February 3, 1916 | | Duncan Byron MacTavish and Robert Abercrombie Pringle |
| 1916 | Royal Commission to Inquire Into and Report Upon the Conditions in Regard to the Delivery of Cargoes of Coal to Coasting Vessels in the Maritime Provinces | | Wilfred Eddy Tupper |
| 1916-1917 | Royal Commission to Inquire into Railways and Transportation in Canada | | Alfred Holland Smith |
| 1917-1918 | Royal Commission on Newsprint | | Robert Abercrombie Pringle |
| 1918 | Royal Commission Appointed to Enquire into Differences Between Metal Contract Shops and Automobile Repair Shops at Winnipeg, and Certain of Their Employees | | Thomas Graham Mathers |
| 1918 | Royal Commission of Inquiry into the Shipyards in Vancouver | | Edward Burns |
| 1918 | Royal Commission to Inquire into the Alleged Unrest Existing in the Shipbuilding Industry in the Province of Quebec | | Farquhar Stuart MacLennan |
| 1918-1919 | Royal Commission on Conditions in the Pilotage Districts of Vancouver, Victoria, Nanaimo and New Westminster | | Thomas Robb |
| 1918-1919 | Royal Commission on the Pilotage Districts of Miramichi, Sydney, Louisbourg, Halifax, St. John, Montreal and Quebec | | Thomas Robb |
| 1919 | Royal Commission on Industrial Relations | The Mathers Commission | Thomas Graham Mathers |
| 1919-1920 | Royal Commission in Racing Inquiry | | John Gunion Rutherford |
| 1919-1922 | Royal Commission on the Possibilities of the Reindeer and Musk-ox Industries in the Arctic and Subarctic Regions | | John Gunion Rutherford |
| 1920 | Royal Commission to Investigate the Dispute Between Members of the General Cartage and Warehousemen's Association of British Columbia and Certain of Their Employees | | William H. Vance |
| 1921-1928 | Royal Commission on Reparation Claims | | James Friel |
| 1922 | Royal Commission on British Columbia Fisheries | | William Duff |
| 1922-1924 | Royal Commission on Pensions and Re-establishment | | James Layton Ralston |
| 1923 | Royal Commission on Great Lakes Grain Rates | | Simon James McLean |
| 1923 | Royal Commission to Inquire Into Industrial Unrest Among the Steel Workers at Sydney, N.S. | | James Wilson Robertson |
| 1923-1924 | Royal Commission on Pulpwood | | Joseph Picard |
| 1923-1925 | Royal Grain Inquiry Commission | | William Ferdinand Alphonse Turgeon |
| 1924 | Royal Commission to Inquire into and Report upon Affairs of the Home Bank of Canada and in the Matter of the Petition of the Depositors in the said Home Bank of Canada | Royal Commission re Home Bank | Harrison Andrew McKeown |
| 1926 | Royal Commission on Maritime Claims | The Duncan Commission | Andrew Rae Duncan |
| 1926-1928 | Royal Commission on Customs and Excise inquiry | | James Thomas Brown and Francois Xavier Lemieux |
| 1927-1928 | Royal Commission on Reconveyance of Land to British Columbia | | William Melville Martin |
| 1927-1928 | Royal Commission to Investigate Charges of Political Partisanship in the Department of Soldiers' Civil Re-establishment | | Alfred Taylour Hunter |
| 1927-1928 | Royal Commission to Investigate the Fisheries of the Maritime Provinces and the Magdalen Islands | | Alexander Kenneth Maclean |
| 1928-1929 | Royal Commission on Radio Broadcasting | The Aird Commission | John Aird |
| 1928-1929 | Royal Commission on the Transfer of the Natural Resources of Manitoba | | William Ferdinand Alphonse Turgeon |
| 1929-1930 | Royal Commission on Technical and Professional Services | | Edward Wentworth Beatty |
| 1930-1933 | Royal Commission on Reparations | | Errol Malcolm William McDougall |
| 1931 | Royal Commission to Inquire into Trading in Grain Futures | | Josiah Stamp |
| 1931-1932 | Royal Commission to Inquire into Railways and Transportation in Canada | | Lyman Poore Duff |
| 1933 | Royal Commission on Banking and Currency | The Macmillan Commission | Hugh Pattison Macmillan |
| 1933-1935 | Royal Commission on the Natural Resources of Saskatchewan | | Andrew Knox Dysart |
| 1934-1935 | Royal Commission on Financial Arrangements Between the Dominion and the Maritime Provinces | | Thomas White |
| 1934-1935 | Royal Commission on Price Spreads | | William Walker Kennedy |
| 1934-1935 | Royal Commission on the Natural Resources of Alberta | | Andrew Knox Dysart |
| 1935 | Royal Commission Appointed to Investigate the Activities of the Canadian Performing Rights Society, Limited, and Similar Societies | | James Parker |
| 1935 | Royal Commission on Certain Allegations Made by Honourable P.J. Veniot, M.P. | | John Babinton Macaulay Baxter |
| 1935 | Royal Commission on Relief Camps, British Columbia | | William Alexander Macdonald |
| 1936-1937 | Royal Commission on Anthracite Coal | | Henry Marshall Tory |
| 1936-1938 | Royal Commission on the Textile Industry | | William Ferdinand Alphonse Turgeon |
| 1936-1938 | Royal Commission to Investigate the Penal System of Canada | The Archambault Commission | Joseph Archambault |
| 1936-1938 | Royal Grain Inquiry Commission | | William Ferdinand Alphonse Turgeon |
| 1937–1940 | Royal Commission on Dominion-Provincial Relations | The Rowell-Sirois Commission | Joseph Sirois (1938–40) and Newton Rowell (1937–38) |
| 1938-1939 | Royal Commission on the Bren Machine Gun Contract | | Henry Hague Davis |
| 1939-1940 | Royal Commission on Salmon Fishing in British Columbia | | Gordon McGregor Sloan |
| 1941 | Royal Commission to Inquire Into the Events Which Occurred at Arvida, Quebec, in July, 1941 | | William Langley Bond and Séverin Létourneau |
| 1941-1942 | Royal Commission on Shipbuilding in the Provinces of Ontario and Quebec | | Léon Mercier Gouin |
| 1942 | Royal Commission on Wage Rates in Steel Plants at Sault Ste Marie, Ontario and Sydney, N.S. | | F. H. Barlow |
| 1942 | Royal Commission to Inquire into and Report upon the Organization, Authorization and Dispatch of the Canadian Expeditionary Force to the Crown Colony of Hong Kong | | Lyman Poore Duff |
| 1942 | Royal Commission to Inquire into the Most Effective Methods to Secure Maximum Production in the Shipyards of British Columbia | | Stephen Ellswood Richards |
| 1943 | Royal Commission to Investigate the Demands of the Coal Miners of Western Canada | | G. B. O'Connor |
| 1944-1945 | Royal Commission on Co-operatives | | Errol Malcolm William McDougall |
| 1944-1945 | Royal Commission on Taxation of Annuities and Family Corporations | | William Carlos Ives |
| 1944-1946 | Royal Commission on Coal | | W. F. Carroll |
| 1945 | Royal Commission on the Halifax Disorders, May 7th-8th, 1945 | | Roy Lindsay Kellock |
| 1945 | Royal Commission on Veterans' Qualifications | | Wilfred Bovey |
| 1946 | Royal Commission on Administrative Classifications in the Public Service | | Walter Lockhart Gordon |
| 1946 | Royal Commission to Investigate the Facts Relating to and the Circumstances Surrounding the Communication by the Public Officials and Other Persons in Positions of Trust of Secret and Confidential Information to Agents of Foreign Power | | Robert Taschereau |
| 1946 | Royal Commission to Investigate the Facts Relating to and the Circumstances Surrounding the Communication, by Public Officials and Other Persons in Positions of Trust, of Secret and Confidential Information to Agents of a Foreign Power | The Kellock-Taschereau Commission | Roy Kellock and Robert Taschereau |
| 1947-1950 | Royal Commission to Investigate Property Claims of Canadian Citizens of Japanese Origin Evacuated from Coast Areas of British Columbia in 1942 | | Henry Irvine Bird |
| 1948-1949 | Royal Commission on Prices | | Clifford Austin Curtis |
| 1948–1951 | Royal Commission on Transportation | | William Ferdinand Alphonse Turgeon |
| 1949–1951 | Royal Commission on National Development in the Arts, Letters and Sciences | The Massey Commission | Vincent Massey |
| 1949-1953 | Royal Commission on the Revision of the Criminal Code | | William Melville Martin |
| 1950 | Royal Commission to Inquire Into the Nature and Extent of the Damage Caused by the 1950 Floods in the Red River Valley in Manitoba | | John B. Carswell and Donald B. Shaw |
| 1950 | Royal Commission to Inquire Into, Review and Report Upon the Rentals Payable Under the Leases in the Townsites and Subdivisions of Banff and Jasper | | Harry O. Patriquin |
| 1950-1951 | Royal Commission to Inquire into the Nature and Extent of the Damage Caused by the Recent Fires in the Towns of Rimouski and Cabano in the Province of Quebec | | Edouard Laurent |
| 1951-1952 | Royal Commission on the South Saskatchewan River Project | | Thomas Henry Hogg |
| 1954 | Royal Commission to Inquire into, Review and Report on the Administration of Quartz Mining and Placer Mining in the Yukon Territory | | George Edwards Cole |
| 1954-1955 | Royal Commission on Agreed Charges | | William Ferdinand Alphonse Turgeon |
| 1954-1956 | Royal Commission on the Law of Insanity as a Defence in Criminal Cases | | James Chalmers McRuer |
| 1954-1958 | Royal Commission on the Criminal Law Relating to Criminal Sexual Psychopaths | | |
| 1954–1960 | Royal Commission on Patents, Copyright and Industrial Designs | The Ilsley Commission | J. L. Ilsley |
| 1955-1957 | Royal Commission on Broadcasting | The Fowler Commission | Robert MacLaren Fowler |
| 1955-1957 | Royal Commission on Canada's Economic Prospects | The Gordon Commission | Walter Lockhart Gordon |
| 1955-1957 | Royal Commission on Coasting Trade | | Wishart Flett Spence |
| 1957-1958 | Royal Commission on Employment of Firemen on Diesel Locomotives in Freight and Yard Service on the Canadian Pacific Railway | | Roy Lindsay Kellock |
| 1957-1958 | Royal Commission on Newfoundland Finances | | John Babbitt McNair |
| 1957–1959 | Royal Commission on Energy | The Borden Commission | Henry Borden |
| 1957-1960 | Royal Commission on Price Spreads of Food Products | | Andrew Stewart |
| 1958-1959 | Royal Commission of Inquiry into the Distribution of Railway Box Cars | | John Bracken |
| 1959 | Royal Commission to Investigate the Unfulfilled Provisions of Treaties 8 and 11 as they Apply to the Indians of the Mackenzie District | | Walter H. Nelson |
| 1959-1960 | Royal Commission on Coal | | Ivan Cleveland Rand |
| 1959-1960 | Royal Commission on the Great Slave Lake Railway | | Marshall E. Manning |
| 1959-1962 | Royal Commission on Transportation | The MacPherson Commission | Murdoch Alexander MacPherson |
| 1960 | Royal Commission to Inquire Into Complaints Received Concerning Certain Activities of Station CHEK-TV, Victoria, British Columbia | | Andrew Stewart |
| 1960-1961 | Royal Commission on Publications | The O'Leary Commission | Michael Grattan O'Leary |
| 1960-1961 | Royal Commission on the Automotive Industry | | Vincent Wheeler Bladen |
| 1960–1963 | Royal Commission on Government Organization | The Glassco Commission | J. Grant Glassco |
| 1961-1964 | Royal Commission on Banking and Finance | | Dana Harris Porter |
| 1961-1964 | Royal Commission on Health Services | The Hall Commission | Emmett M. Hall |
| 1962–1966 | Royal Commission on Taxation | The Carter Commission | Kenneth LeMesurier Carter |
| 1962-1971 | Royal Commission on Pilotage | | Yves Bernier |
| 1963–1970 | Royal Commission on Bilingualism and Biculturalism | The Laurendeau-Dunton Commission | Arnold Davidson Dunton and André Laurendeau |
| 1965-1966 | Royal Commission of Inquiry Into Working Conditions in the Post Office Department | | André Montpetit |
| 1966 | Royal Commission to Inquire into the Dealings of the Honourable Mr. Justice Leo A. Landreville, with Northern Ontario Natural Gas Limited | | Ivan Cleveland Rand |
| 1966-1969 | Royal Commission on Security | The Mackenzie Commission | Maxwell Weir Mackenzie |
| 1966-1971 | Royal Commission on Farm Machinery | | Clarence Lyle Barber |
| 1967–1970 | Royal Commission on the Status of Women | The Bird Commission | Florence Bird |
| 1970-1971 | Royal Commission Inquiry and Formal Investigation into the Circumstances Surrounding the Grounding of the Steam Tanker Arrow | | Gordon L. S. Hart |
| 1974-1976 | Royal Commission on the Health and Safety of Workers in Mines | The Ham Commission | James Milton Ham |
| 1975–1978 | Royal Commission on Corporate Concentration | | Robert B. Bryce |
| 1976-1979 | Royal Commission on Financial Management and Accountability | | Allen Thomas Lambert |
| 1980-1981 | Royal Commission on Conditions of Foreign Service | | Pamela A. McDougall |
| 1980-1981 | Royal Commission on Newspapers | The Kent Commission | Thomas Woralla Kent |
| 1982–1985 | Royal Commission on the Economic Union and Development Prospects for Canada | The MacDonald Commission | Donald S. MacDonald |
| 1982–1985 | Royal Commission on the Ocean Ranger Marine Disaster | | T. Alex Hickman |
| 1984-1986 | Royal Commission on Seals and the Sealing Industry in Canada | | Albert H. Malouf |
| 1988-1992 | Royal Commission on the Future of the Toronto Waterfront | The Crombie Commission | David Crombie |
| 1989-1992 | Royal Commission on National Passenger Transportation | The Hyndman Commission | Louis D. Hyndman |
| 1989–1993 | Royal Commission on New Reproductive Technologies | The Baird Commission | Patricia Baird |
| 1991 | Royal Commission on Electoral Reform and Party Financing | The Lortie Commission | Pierre Lortie |
| 1991–1996 | Royal Commission on Aboriginal Peoples | | René Dussault and Georges Erasmus |

== Commissions of inquiry ==
| Period | Commission name | Nickname | Commissioner/chair |
|---|---|---|---|
| 1964-1966 | Commission of Inquiry as to the Future of the Air Canada Overhaul Base at Winnipeg International Airport, and Related Matters | | Donald Alexander Thompson |
| 1965-1966 | Commission of Inquiry into Freshwater Fish Marketing | | George H. McIvo |
| 1966 | Commission of Inquiry Into Complaints Made by George Victor Spencer | | Dalton Courtwright Wells |
| 1966 | Commission of Inquiry into Matters Relating to One Gerda Munsinger | | Wishart Flett Spence |
| 1967-1968 | Commission of Inquiry re Administration of Justice in the Hay River of the Northwest Territories | | William George Morrow |
| 1969–1973 | Commission of Inquiry into the Non-Medical Use of Drugs | The Le Dain Commission | Gerald Le Dain |
| 1970 | Commission of Inquiry into Mail Transport in Montreal | | Hyman Carl Goldenberg |
| 1975-1976 | Commission of Inquiry into the Marketing of Beef | | Maxwell Weir Mackenzie |
| 1975-1976 | Commission of Inquiry Into the Matter of a Crash of a Panarctic Electra Aircraft at Rea Point, Northwest Territories | | William A. Stevenson |
| 1976-1979 | Commission of Inquiry into Bilingual Air Traffic Services in Quebec | | W. R. Sinclair |
| 1977-1978 | Commission of Inquiry Into Newfoundland Transportation | | Arthur M. Sullivan |
| 1977–1981 | Commission of Inquiry Concerning Certain Activities of the Royal Canadian Mounted Police | The McDonald Commission | D.C. McDonald |
| 1979-1981 | Commission of Inquiry into Certain Allegations Concerning Commercial Practices of the Canadian Dairy Commission | | Hugh F. Gibson |
| 1984-1985 | Commission of Inquiry on the Pharmaceutical Industry | | Harry C. Eastman |
| 1985-1986 | Commission of Inquiry into the Collapse of the Canadian Commercial Bank (CCB) and the Northland Bank | | Willard Z. Estey |
| 1985-1986 | Commission of Inquiry on Unemployment Insurance | | Claude Forget |
| 1985-1986 | Commission of Inquiry on War Criminals | Deschênes Commission | Jules Deschênes |
| 1986 | Commission of Inquiry, Hinton Train Collision | | René P. Foisy |
| 1986-1987 | Commission of Inquiry Into the Facts of Allegations of Conflict of Interest Concerning the Honourable Sinclair M. Stevens | | W.D. Parker |
| 1986-1988 | Commission of Inquiry Concerning Certain Matters Associated with the Westbank Indian Band | | John E. Hall |
| 1988-1990 | Commission of Inquiry into the Use of Drugs and Banned Practices Intended to Increase Athletic Performance | | Charles L. Dubin |
| 1989-1992 | Commission of Inquiry into the Air Ontario Crash at Dryden, Ontario | The Moshansky Commission | Virgil P. Moshansky |
| 1993–1997 | Commission of Inquiry on the Blood System in Canada | The Krever Commission | Horace Krever |
| 1995-1997 | Commission of Inquiry Into the Deployment of Canadian Forces to Somalia | | Gilles Létourneau |
| 2001–2002 | Commission on the Future of Health Care in Canada | The Romanow Commission | Roy Romanow |
| 2001-2006 | Commission of Inquiry Into the Actions of Canadian Officials in Relation to Maher Arar | | Dennis O'Connor |
| 2004–2006 | Commission of Inquiry into the Sponsorship Program and Advertising Activities | The Gomery Commission | John Gomery |
| 2006-2010 | Commission of Inquiry into the Investigation of the Bombing of Air India Flight 182 | The Major Commission | John C. Major |
| 2008-2010 | Commission of Inquiry Into Certain allegations Respecting Business and Financial Dealings Between Karlheinz Schreiber and the Right Honourable Brian Mulroney | | Jeffrey James Oliphant |
| 2009-2012 | Commission of Inquiry into the Decline of Sockeye Salmon in the Fraser River | The Cohen Commission | Bruce Cohen |
| 2020-2022 | Joint Federal/Provincial Commission into the April 2020 Nova Scotia Mass Casualty Joint inquiry with the Government of Nova Scotia | Mass Casualty Commission | Michael MacDonald, Leanne J. Fitch, and Kim Stanton |
| 2022-2023 | Public Order Emergency Commission | | Paul Rouleau |

=== Task forces ===
Task forces
| Period | Commission name | Commissioner/chair |
|---|---|---|
| 1969 | Federal Task Force on Agriculture | Douglas Ross Campbell |
| 1970-1972 | Task Force on Foreign Ownership (The Gray Report) | Herb Gray |
| 1977-1979 | The Task Force on Canadian Unity | Jean-Luc Pepin and John Robarts |
| 2001 | National Broadband Task Force | David Johnston |
| 2024 | Employment Equity Act Review Task Force | Prof. Adelle Blackett |

== Other public inquiries ==
Many of these are task forces in miniature.

Others
| Period | Commission name | Commissioner/chair |
|---|---|---|
| 1916 | Munitions Industry Inquiry Department of Labour | Colin George Snider |
| 1875 | Commission Appointed to Investigate the Nature and Extent of the Commercial Advantages to be Derived from the Construction of the Baie Verte Canal | John Young |
| 1875-1876 | Commission to Ascertain Persons Entitled to Grants of Land and Scrip in Manitoba | John Maule Machar and Matthew Ryan |
| 1876-1877 | Commission for Investigating the Books, Accounts, and Vouchers of the Northern Railway Company of Canada | Larratt William Smith |
| 1879 | Commission to Investigate Charges Against Certain Employees of the Welland Canal | David Stark |
| 1885-1886 | Commission to Investigate all Claims Arising out of the Late Rebellion in the Northwest Territories | William Hayes Jackson |
| 1886 | Commission to Investigate Alleged Irregularities Regarding a Fuel Wood Contract at the Citadel | Jules Ernest LaRue |
| 1894-1895 | Commission on Cattle Freight Rates | William Loftus Magee |
| 1905-1907 | British Columbia Fisheries Commission | Edward Ernest Prince |
| 1912-1913 | Shell-fish Fishery Commission | Edward Ernest Prince |
| 1912-1914 | National Transcontinental Railway Investigating Commission | George Lynch-Staunton |
| 1913-1916 | Pelagic Sealing Commission | Louis Arthur Audette |
| 1915-1920 | Munition Resources Commission | Thomas Cantley |
| 1928 | Tobacco Inquiry Commission in the Provinces of Ontario and Quebec | Edgar S. Archibald |
| 1964-1965 | Special Public Inquiry 1964 | Frédéric Dorion |
| 1974-1977 | The Mackenzie Valley Pipeline Inquiry (The Berger Inquiry) | Thomas R. Berger |
| 1990-1991 | Citizens' Forum on Canada's Future | Keith Spicer |
| 1993-1994 | Canadian Transportation Accident Investigation and Safety Board Act Review Commission | Louis D. Hyndman |
| 2009-2015 | Truth and Reconciliation Commission of Canada | Murray Sinclair, Marie Wilson, and Wilton Littlechild |
| 2016-2019 | National Inquiry into Missing and Murdered Indigenous Women and Girls (MMIWG) | Marion Buller |

== Provincial commissions and inquiries ==
| Period | Province | Name | Issue | Commissioner/chair |
|---|---|---|---|---|
| 1903 | Manitoba | Royal Commission re Charges Against the Chief Clerk of the Department of Agriculture and Immigration | Charges and statements made by department clerk Melvin Bartlett against deputy minister Hugh McKellar | D. M. Walker and R. H. Myers |
| 1916-1917 | Manitoba | Royal Commission Constituted to Inquire into all Matters Pertaining to the Manitoba Agricultural College | The development of the Manitoba Agricultural College in the 1910s | A. C. Galt |
| 1916-1917 | Manitoba | Royal Commission Constituted to Inquire into and Report on all Expenditures for Road Work during the Year 1914 | Road work expenditures in Emerson, Roblin, Russell, Rockwood, and Gimli | G. Paterson |
| 1919 | Manitoba | Royal Commission to Enquire into and Report upon the Causes and Effects of the General Strike which Recently Existed in the City of Winnipeg for a Period of Six Weeks, Including the Methods of Calling and Carrying on Such Strike | Winnipeg general strike | Hugh Amos Robson |
| 1945-1947 | Manitoba | Royal Commission on Adult Education | Adult education in Manitoba | A. W. Trueman |
| 1958 | British Columbia | Royal Commission, Second Narrows Bridge Inquiry | Collapse of the Second Narrows Bridge on June 17, 1958 | Sherwood Lett |
| 1957-1959 | Manitoba | Royal Commission on Education | Education in Manitoba, including higher education | R. O. MacFarlane |
| 1958 | Alberta | Royal Commission on the Development of Northern Alberta | Development of Northern Alberta | J. G. MacGregory |
| 1959 | Alberta | Royal Commission on Education in Alberta | Education in Alberta, including higher education | Donald Cameron |
| 1962 | Quebec | Commission of Inquiry on the sale of the gas network of Hydro-Quebec to the Quebec Natural Gas Corporation | Natural gas scandal implicating high-ranking members of the Maurice Duplessis government in insider trading | Elie Salvas |
| 1963 | Quebec | Commission of Inquiry concerning the purchasing methods used in the Department of Colonization and the Government Purchasing Service | Cronyism in the distribution of government contracts | Elie Salvas |
| 1963 | Alberta | Royal Commission on Prearranged Funeral Services | Prearranged Funeral Services | C.C. McLaurin |
| 1967 | Alberta | Royal Commission on Juvenile Delinquency | Juvenile Delinquency in Alberta | Frank H. Quigley |
| 1968 | Quebec | Commission of Inquiry on the Situation of the French Language and Linguistic Rights in Quebec | Linguistic rights in Quebec | Jean-Denis Gendron |
| 1980-1984 | Ontario | Royal Commission on Matters of Health and Safety Arising from the Use of Asbestos in Ontario | Usage of asbestos in Ontario | J. Stefan Dupré |
| 1988-1991 | Manitoba | Aboriginal Justice Inquiry | 1971 murder of Helen Betty Osborne and 1988 death of J.J. Harper | Alvin Hamilton and Murray Sinclair |
| 1996-1998 | Ontario | Commission on Proceedings Involving Guy Paul Morin (Kaufman Commission or Morin Inquiry) | Wrongful conviction in 1992 of Guy Paul Morin for the 1988 murder of Christine Jessop | Fred Kaufman |
| 1999-2001 | Manitoba | Aboriginal Justice Implementation Commission | Implementing recommendations of the Aboriginal Justice Inquiry | Wendy Whitecloud and Paul Chartrand |
| 2003-2007 | Ontario | Ipperwash Inquiry | 1995 death of Dudley George | Sidney B. Linden |
| 2004 | Ontario | Rae Report | Higher education in Ontario | Bob Rae |
| 2005 | Ontario | Cornwall Inquiry | Allegations of abuse of young people in Cornwall, Ontario, by adults in positions of trust | G. Normand Glaude |
| 2005-2006 | Nova Scotia | Nunn Commission | The youth criminal justice system and the death of Theresa McEvoy | Merlin Nunn |
| 2005-2008 | Ontario | Inquiry into Pediatric Forensic Pathology in Ontario (Goudge Inquiry) | Errors in several criminal investigations into suspicious deaths involving children | Stephen Goudge |
| 2006-2007 | Manitoba | Commission of Inquiry Into Certain Aspects of the Trial and Conviction of James Driskell | Wrongful conviction of James Driskell | Patrick LeSage |
| 2007 | Alberta | Alberta Royalty Review | Resource royalties collected from petroleum and natural gas companies | William M. Hunter |
| 2008 | Manitoba | Taman Inquiry into the Investigation and Prosecution of Derek Harvey-Zenk | Case of Derek Harvey-Zenk | Roger Salhany |
| 2009-2010 | British Columbia | Braidwood Inquiry | Killing of Robert Dziekański | Thomas R. Braidwood |
| 2010-2012 | British Columbia | Missing Women Commission of Inquiry | Response of law enforcement to reports of missing and murdered women | Wally Oppal |
| 2011 | Quebec | Commission of Inquiry on the Awarding and Management of Public Contracts in the Construction Industry (Charbonneau Commission) | Potential corruption in the management of public construction contracts | France Charbonneau |
| 2012-2013 | Manitoba | Inquiry into the Circumstances Surrounding the Death of Phoenix Sinclair | Death of Phoenix Sinclair | Ted Hughes |
| 2017 | Ontario | Public Inquiry into the Safety and Security of Residents in the Long-Term Care Homes System | Case of Elizabeth Wettlaufer | |
| 2020-2021 | Ontario | Long-Term Care COVID-19 Commission | How COVID-19 spread in long-term care and what was done to prevent it | Frank N. Marrocco |

== See also ==
- Public inquiry
- List of Canadian tribunals
