= Aboriginal Justice Inquiry =

The Aboriginal Justice Inquiry (AJI), officially the Public Inquiry into the Administration of Justice and Aboriginal People, was a public inquiry commissioned by the Manitoba government into the administration of justice regarding the 1971 murder of Helen Betty Osborne and 1988 death of J.J. Harper. Commissioned in 1988, with its final report presented in 1991, its stated purpose was "to examine the relationship between the Aboriginal peoples of Manitoba and the justice system."

The Commission of Inquiry was composed of Alvin Hamilton, former Associate Chief Justice of Manitoba of the Court of Queen's Bench, and Murray Sinclair, then-Associate Chief Judge of the Provincial Court and former Justice of the Court of Queen's Bench.

To develop a plan to act upon the Inquiry's recommendations, the Aboriginal Justice Implementation Commission was created in late November 1999.

== Background and overview ==
At the time of the inquiry, Manitoba had the highest proportion of Aboriginal people in its population among the 10 provinces of Canada. (In 1996, Manitoba's population of 1.1 million included about 77,500 First Nations residents and 57,000 Métis and Non-Status Indians.)

Research carried out for the Inquiry on Provincial Court data revealed that:

- Aboriginal people constitute 11.8% of the Manitoba population, yet account for more than 50% of people in correctional institutions;
- Aboriginal males between 18 and 34 years old spend 1.5 times longer in pre-trial detention than other suspects;
- only 1 in 5 Aboriginal accused are successful in obtaining bail, compared to over half of non-Aboriginal defendants; and
- approximately 25% of Aboriginal persons received sentences that involve some degree of incarceration, compared to 10% of non-Aboriginal persons.

The Inquiry was commissioned in 1988 in response to two high-profile incidents:

- the November 1987 trial of two men for the 1971 murder of Helen Betty Osborne in The Pas. Allegedly, the identity of four (non-Indigenous) people who were present at the murder was known widely in the community shortly after the killing. Although four people were present at the time of the killing, only one was convicted of a crime—which itself took 16 years.
- the March 1988 death of Island Lake Tribal Council executive director John Joseph Harper following an encounter with a Winnipeg Police officer, the internal investigation to which many people believed had left questions unanswered.

With these in mind, the Commission of Inquiry's stated purpose was "to examine the relationship between the Aboriginal peoples of Manitoba and the justice system." The Inquiry was co-chaired by Alvin Hamilton, former Associate Chief Justice of Manitoba of the Court of Queen's Bench, and Murray Sinclair, then-Associate Chief Judge of the Provincial Court and former Justice of the Court of Queen's Bench.

== Final report ==
The final report of the Aboriginal Justice Inquiry was presented in the fall of 1991, and made 296 recommendations in total.

In its first page, the report summarized the relationship between Indigenous people and the justice system:

The justice system has failed Manitoba’s Aboriginal people on a massive scale. It has been insensitive and inaccessible, and has arrested and imprisoned Aboriginal people in grossly disproportionate numbers. Aboriginal people who are arrested are more likely than non-Aboriginal people to be denied bail, spend more time in pre-trial detention and spend less time with their lawyers, and, if convicted, are more likely to be incarcerated.... It is not merely that the justice system has failed Aboriginal people; justice has also been denied to them. For more than a century the rights of Aboriginal people have been ignored and eroded.

The report said that, during the jury selection process in the Osborne case, defence counsel used its peremptory challenges to eliminate the 6 Indigenous people called from the jury panel. Commissioner Murray Sinclair noted that, at that time, 70% of the people in northern Manitoba were Indigenous, yet none of the people on the jury were Indigenous. The AJI recommended the abolition of the use of peremptory challenges:

While the practice of challenging people without having to give a reason is sanctioned by the Criminal Code, we question the logic and fairness of allowing the practice to continue when its application can prevent Aboriginal people from sitting on a jury solely because they are Aboriginal.

The report also said that delays in responding to summonses can effectively exclude Indigenous participation in jury duty: many Indigenous people in remote areas have limited access to mail and telephones, and those living in urban areas change residences more frequently than non-Indigenous people. As such, the report recommended that when an exemption is granted by a sheriff, the person ought to be replaced by someone from the same community. It also recommended that all jury summonses be enforced, even when a sufficient number jurors have responded.

One of the integral elements of the Inquiry's reform strategy was the recommendation for the establishment of Aboriginal justice systems.

In late November 1999, to develop a plan to act upon the Inquiry's recommendations, the Aboriginal Justice Implementation Commission was created, led by Commissioners Wendy Whitecloud and Paul Chartrand. The Aboriginal Justice Inquiry-Child Welfare Initiative was subsequently created in 2000 to help transition child protection and family support services to Manitoba's Aboriginal communities.

== Aftermath ==
From 1989 to 2020, eleven Royal Commissions or Commissions of Inquiry throughout Canada have addressed the issue of Indigenous justice either directly or as one among many questions regarding Indigenous people in Canada.

On 26 February 2021 (Aboriginal Justice Awareness Day), the Grand Chief of the Assembly of Manitoba Chiefs, Arlen Dumas, called out both the federal and provincial governments on their failure to fully implement the Aboriginal Justice Inquiry.

=== Aboriginal Justice Implementation Commission ===
The Aboriginal Justice Implementation Commission (AJIC) was created by the Government of Manitoba "to develop an action plan based on the original Aboriginal Justice Inquiry recommendations."

The Commission was created in late November 1999, and issued its final report on 29 June 2001. It was led by Commissioners Wendy Whitecloud and Paul Chartrand, who also served as a Commissioner on the Royal Commission on Aboriginal Peoples. Elder advisers of the Commission were Eva McKay and Doris Young.

=== Aboriginal Justice Inquiry-Child Welfare Initiative ===
The Aboriginal Justice Inquiry-Child Welfare Initiative (AJI-CWI) was created in 2000 to help transition child protection and family support services to Manitoba's Aboriginal communities, giving them the ability and responsibility to provide such services to their people throughout the province. The AJIC recommended that the AJI child welfare recommendations be prioritized for implementation.

The AJI-CWI began with the signing of Memorandums of Understanding with the Assembly of Manitoba Chiefs on behalf of southern First Nations, the Manitoba Keewatinowi Okimakanak (MKO) on behalf of northern First Nations, and with the Manitoba Metis Federation on behalf of the Métis people of Manitoba.

== See also ==
- Manitoba Justice
- Taman Inquiry
- Phoenix Sinclair Inquiry
- Driskell Inquiry
- Royal Commission on Aboriginal Peoples (national)
- R v Gladue
