= James Milton Ham =

Canadian engineer and university administrator (1920–1997)

10th President of the University of Toronto
- In office 1978–1983
- Chancellor: Arthur B. B. Moore; George Ignatieff
- Preceded by: John Robert Evans
- Succeeded by: David Strangway

Dean of the University of Toronto Faculty of Applied Science and Engineering
- In office 1964–1973
- Preceded by: R.R. McLaughlin
- Succeeded by: Bernard Etkin

Personal details
- Born: September 21, 1920 Coboconk, Ontario
- Died: September 16, 1997 (aged 76)
- Education: University of Toronto; Massachusetts Institute of Technology
- Profession: Engineer

James Milton Ham, OC OOnt (September 21, 1920 – September 16, 1997) was a Canadian engineer, university administrator and the 10th president of the University of Toronto.

He chaired the Royal Commission on the Health and Safety of Workers in Mines, and was described as the father of occupational health and safety in Canada.

== Early life and education ==
Born in Coboconk, Ontario, Ham attended Runnymede Collegiate Institute and received a B.A.Sc. degree from the University of Toronto in 1943.

== Career ==
After graduation, Ham joined the Royal Canadian Navy as an electrical officer. After the Second World War, he was a lecturer and housemaster in the Ajax division of the University of Toronto. In 1946, he left to study at the Massachusetts Institute of Technology where he received an S.M. degree in 1947 and an Sc.D. degree in 1952. He was a research associate from 1949 to 1951 and was assistant professor of electrical engineering from 1951 to 1952.

In 1953, he returned to the University of Toronto as associate professor of electrical engineering, becoming professor in 1959. He headed the Department of Electrical Engineering in 1964, before becoming the dean of the Faculty of Applied Science and Engineering in 1966 and the Dean of Graduate Studies in 1976. He served as president of the University of Toronto from 1978 to 1983. In 1983, he received the Sir John Kennedy Medal. He was appointed president emeritus in 1988.

Ham was a Canadian pioneer in the teaching and promotion of research in the field of automatic control. He supervised the first doctoral students in that field at a Canadian university. He initiated the Associate Committee on Automatic Control of the National Research Council of Canada and chaired that committee from 1959 to 1964. He was a member of the executive committee of the International Federation of Automatic Control from 1966 to 1972.

He was also an enthusiastic teacher of the fundamental principles of electrical engineering and was the author, with Gordon Slemon, of a textbook on that topic.

=== Professional affiliations ===
Ham was a member of the National Research Council of Canada, from 1969 to 1974.

He was chairman, Committee on Education and Training, of the World Federation of Engineering Organizations from 1971 to 1974.

From 1974 to 1976, he was the chairman of the Ontario government's Royal Commission on Health and Safety of Workers in Mines (known as the Ham Commission). The commission's report included 117 recommendations about health and safety in mines. The report also established the Internal Responsibility System ("IRS"), a strategy for the oversight of health and safety in the province's workplaces that remains today as a standard that has been adopted across Canada and internationally.

He was chairman, Advisory Committee on Safety and Training, Royal Commission on the Ocean Ranger Marine Disaster from 1982 to 1985.

From 1986 to 1988 he was chairman, Industrial Disease Standards Panel, Ministry of Labour, Ontario. The Panel had been created by statutory amendments to the Workers' Compensation Act. Its purpose was to investigate issues of occupational disease in the province; and to make policy recommendations to the Workers' Compensation Board for possible compensation. Among the issues tackled by the Panel during his two years as Chairman can be included lung diseases in gold and uranium mining, various cancers from PCB exposures, and other contentious occupational disease issues.

In 1987, he was a founding fellow of the Canadian Academy of Engineering, serving as its vice president from 1988 to 1989 and president from 1990 to 1991.

He was advisor to the president of the Canadian Institute for Advanced Research from 1988 to 1990.

=== Honours and awards ===
In 1980, he was made an Officer of the Order of Canada in recognition as a "scientist, engineer and scholar who has had a distinguished academic and administrative career".*

He was posthumously selected as a 2014 inductee into the Canadian Science and Engineering Hall of Fame. The induction took place in Ottawa on January 20, 2015.

In 1989, he was awarded the Order of Ontario.

He was made a Fellow of the Institute of Electrical and Electronics Engineers in 1967.

He received the Sir John Kennedy medal from the Engineering Institute of Canada in 1983.

He was awarded honorary doctoral degrees by 13 universities in Canada and Korea.

== Sources ==
- "History of Employment Standards in Ontario". Archived from the original on March 26, 2005.
- "Canadian Who's Who 1997 entry".
