= Royal Commission on the Health and Safety of Workers in Mines =

Canadian government enquiry

The Royal Commission on the Health and Safety of Workers in Mines, informally known as the Ham Commission, was a 1974 Canadian royal commission founded to investigate and report on the safety of underground mines.

The commission was created by Bill Davis as a result of the 1974 Elliot Lake miners strike and led by James Milton Ham. Findings from the commission formed the basis of all subsequent health and safety legislation in Canada.

== Background ==
In the 1970s, the Canadian mining sector had the highest injury rate of all industries in Canada.

On 18 April 1974, uranium miners at Elliot Lake, concerned about the prevalence of lung cancer and silicosis, started a fourteen-day wildcat strike. The strike prompted Ontario Premier Bill Davis on 10 September 1974 to ask engineer and university administrator James Ham to lead a commission on the health and safety of workers in uranium mines. The commission focused on the two uranium mining regions in Ontario: Elliot Lake and Bancroft.

James Ham submitted his report on 30 June 1976. Later the commission became known as The Ham Commission.

== Findings ==
The commission produced 117 recommendations including a need for legislation to provide workers with three rights, which the Institute for Work & Health described in 2010:

1. "Knowledge – having ready access to information about actual and expected conditions at the workplace, and about the state of health of the workers;
2. Contributive responsibility – to provide individual and collective insight on problems on the basis of knowledge and work experience; and
3. Direct responsibility – to make operative decisions that influence conditions at work".

These three rights have become the basis of all modern health and safety legislation in Canada. The commission created the concept of the Internal Responsibility System which became a key element of the Occupational Health and Safety Act in 1979. The Internal Responsibility System requires that workplaces properly control risk, although systems of government inspections and regulation were also recommended, with that responsibility falling to the Ontario Ministry of Labour. Other recommendations were documented in United Steelworkers union leader Lynn R. Williams' 2011 memoir One Day Longer:

- that government consult with industry and workers while creating safety rules in mines, specifically with regards to dust and ventilation
- that government make rules to measure dust exposure in mines
- that workers get compensated for injury from workplace hazards
- that air quality be monitored, with specific regards to radiation, dust and contaminants
- that government consult with workers, industry and the Workmen's Compensation Board and create better systems for reporting of accidents and injuries
- that a health and safety committee be struck at every mine with equal representation from workers and management
- that priority be given to the accredited training for mine workers
- that workers be have a mechanism to object to tasks assigned by their line manager if they deem them unreasonable and that their objection be heard by more senior management with an auditor observing
- that industry stated health surveillance of workers

== Immediate impact ==
The recommendations led to the passing of Bill 70, which lead to the creation of the provincial Occupational Health and Safety Act in 1979. Because the commission was a federal government process, the findings did not immediately affect provincial legislation, however the unionized miners used the recommendations from the commission to inform their collective bargaining.

Vic Pakalnis, the CEO of the Mining Innovation Rehabilitation and Applied Research Corporation described Ham as the "father of occupational health and safety in Canada."

== See also ==
- Uranium mining, Health risks
