= Faron Hall =

Canadian rescuer

- Born: 14 May 1964; Manitoba, Canada
- Died: 17 August 2014 (aged 50); Winnipeg, Manitoba, Canada
- Cause of death: Drowning
- Resting place: Brookside Cemetery, Winnipeg
- Education: University of Manitoba (no degree)
- Occupation: Teaching assistant

Faron Hall (May 14, 1964 – August 17, 2014) was a Canadian man who had become known as the "Homeless Hero", after rescuing several people from drowning in several separate incidents.

== Biography ==
Hall was born on the Dakota Tipi First Nation reserve near Portage la Prairie, Manitoba on May 14, 1964. He was born to Marianne Hall and John Hupa, both of which were farm workers. He is documented to have had at least two sisters and two brothers. Due to his parents' work, he had an unstable childhood and little supervision. According to his uncle Neil Hall, he was taken away by the Children's Aid and put into foster care at the age of three. When he was around eight, he was returned to the reserve.

Hall was known for his generosity and kindness. He loved sports and swimming, and was friends with everyone. When he was younger, he had a crush on a girl and when she said she wanted candy, walked to the nearest store two miles away to purchase some for her. He enjoyed making people happy and caring for others.

Hall grew up in a foster home in Waverley Heights and at eighteen, he entered a high school and employment skills program that was for inner-city youths. He graduated, working as a teacher's aide at Hugh John Macdonald School while studying education at the University of Manitoba for two years. He did various odd jobs as well. The program was also where he met his first girlfriend, Cheryl James. James was impressed by his confidence and speaking abilities, saying "He wasn’t just interested in helping himself, but he also wanted to help the rest of us in the class succeed". He would often visit his father in the Sioux Valley reserve near Brandon, Manitoba with James and her two nephews.

Hall returned to Winnipeg in 1999 or 2000 after working construction jobs in Saskatchewan. He became homeless in 2001, spending time in the Saint Boniface area and living in tents along the Red River. He occasionally drank socially, but after his mother's murder in 2004 he began to drink more heavily. Neil Hall said, "That tore him apart. He started not caring because he felt really bad he didn’t reconnect with her sooner". His sister, Kristi Hall, was murdered three years later in 2007. These events are said to have contributed significantly to the worsening of his mental health and alcoholism.

On May 1 2009, Hall and his friend Wayne Spence were sitting along the riverbank when nineteen year old Joseph Mousseau fell over the Provencher Bridge guardrail and into the river. The boy was running across lanes of traffic with his friends, and attempted to pole-vault over the railing onto what he thought was a pedestrian bridge below. However, the two bridges were not connected and he fell into the water rather than onto concrete. As he fell, he hit his leg and back on a support beam, causing him to scream out. The noise alerted Hall, who immediately discarded his backpack and dove into the river to save the teenager. At an angle against the strong current in cold water, Hall swam at least fifteen meters to reach Mousseau. The boy was panicked, unable to swim due to his injuries, pushing and fighting against Hall. Hall said to Mousseau, "Don’t fight me! I’m trying to save you. Otherwise we’re both going to drown".

In May 2009, while intoxicated he rescued a 19-year-old who had fallen from a bridge. Sam Katz presented him with the Mayor's Medal of Valour and baseball season tickets. Shortly afterwards, he moved into a government-owned apartment block.

In September 2009, once again while intoxicated he rescued a woman from drowning in the same river.

In December 2009, he was presented with two medals by the Manitoba Life Saving Society. The International Supreme Master Television Network gave him its Hero Award.

On Christmas Eve 2009, he was attacked and beaten by several people who had seen him on the news.

In February 2010, he was again the subject of a vicious beating.

In May 2011, Hall was involved in an incident that sent him to jail for assault on a woman. The victim had offered him apples instead of money, in response to his panhandling, and Hall responded by assaulting her with the car door.

He was involved in many more incidents, often alcohol-related, from 2012 through 2014

In August 2014, his body was recovered from the Red River. He had earlier been seen in distress in the river, but rescue attempts were unsuccessful.
