= Patricia Baird =

British medical geneticist (1937-2026)

Patricia Baird OC OBC FRSC
- Born: 11 October 1937; Littleborough, Lancashire, England
- Died: 7 August 2026 (aged 88); Vancouver, British Columbia, Canada
- Education: McGill University
- Spouse: Robert Merrifield Baird (m. 1964)
- Children: 3
- Awards: Order of Canada; Order of British Columbia
- Scientific career
- Fields: Medical Genetics
- Workplaces: University of British Columbia

Patricia Ann Baird, OC OBC (11 October 1937 – 7 August 2026) was a British medical geneticist active in Canada. Her research specialised in the relationship between medical technology and ethics.

== Early life and education ==
Patricia Baird was born in Littleborough, Lancashire, England on 11 October 1937, the daughter of Harold and Winifred Cainen Holt. She was educated at the Queen Mary School for Girls in Lytham, Lancashire. She emigrated to Canada at the age of 17 and was accepted to McGill University. She received a Bachelor of Science degree in 1959 and a M.D., C.M. in 1963 from McGill University in Montreal.

== Career and research ==
Baird was a University Killam Distinguished Professor Emerita, Department of Medical Genetics at the University of British Columbia. In 1978, Baird became the head of the Department of Medical Genetics, leading the department to become an internationally renowned research institution. She was the first woman to both be named as chair of a clinical medical department and to be elected to the Board of Governors at the University of British Columbia. In 1991, she became Vice-President of the Canadian Institute for Advanced Research. In 1989, she became the chair of the Royal Commission on New Reproductive Technologies.

== Personal life and death ==
In 1964, she married Robert Merrifield Baird. Together, they had three children. She died through medical aid (MAID) at her home in Vancouver alongside her husband on 7 August 2026, at the age of 88. She had Parkinson's disease and had sustained a recent fall prior to her death.

== Honours and awards ==
In 1992, Baird was recognised as a Member of the Order of British Columbia (OBC). In 2000, she was made an Officer of the Order of Canada (OC) in recognition of being "a contributor to science, public policy and the advancement of women". In 2001, Baird became a Fellow of the Royal Society of Canada (FRSC).

Baird was presented the Cooper Ornithological Society Harry R. Painton Award in 2013, along with her co-authors Hope M. Draheim and Susan M. Haig, for their paper entitled “Temporal analysis of mtDNA variation reveals decreased genetic diversity in Least Terns” published in The Condor.

== Selected publications ==
- Baird, P. A., & MacDonald, E. C. (1981). An epidemiologic study of congenital malformations of the anterior abdominal wall in more than half a million consecutive live births. American Journal of Human Genetics.
- Spouge, D., & Baird, P. A. (1985). Hirschsprung disease in a large birth cohort. Teratology.
- Baird, P. A., Anderson, T. W., Newcombe, H. B., & Lowry, R. B. (1988). Genetic disorders in children and young adults: a population study. American Journal of Human Genetics.
- McIntosh, G. C., Olshan, A. F., & Baird, P. A. (1995). Paternal age and the risk of birth defects in offspring. Epidemiology.
- Baird, P. (2002). Identification of genetic susceptibility to common diseases: the case for regulation. Perspectives in Biology and Medicine.
