= Brookside Cemetery (Winnipeg) =

Cemetery in Winnipeg, Manitoba, Canada

- Interactive map of Brookside Cemetery

Details
- Established: 1878
- Location: 3001 Notre Dame Ave, Winnipeg, Manitoba
- Country: Canada
- Coordinates: 49.9205°N 97.2224°W
- Owned by: City of Winnipeg
- No. of graves: 200,000+
- Find a Grave: Brookside Cemetery

Brookside Cemetery in Winnipeg, Manitoba, is the largest cemetery in western Canada, containing the graves of more than 200,000 people. With the first interment taking place in 1878, it is one of the oldest cemeteries in Winnipeg.

Brookside has been used in some films, such as Bride of Chucky (1998).

== Memorials ==
The Brookside Cemetery houses a municipal Military "Field of Honour," which was opened in 1915 and is one of Canada's largest and oldest. The Field of Honour houses the only Stone of Remembrance in Canada, unveiled in 1960 by the Commonwealth War Graves Commission to honour "sailors, soldiers and airmen of the Commonwealth who lie buried in Canada," having served in either of the world wars. Since 1915, Brookside Cemetery has interred 11,000 veterans, servicemen, and women, and includes 470 war graves.

Brookside also includes a section dedicated to those who donated their bodies to medical research and teaching at the University of Manitoba. Since 1952, the University has conducted an annual burial and committal service known as the "Service After Death" as a tribute to such people. A monument and plaque were dedicated on 27 June 2003.

The firefighter section of the cemetery includes a monument commemorating local firefighters.

Other memorials include:

- Korean War Veterans memorial
- Hong Kong Veterans cairn – honour members of C Force in the Battle of Hong Kong (namely members of Winnipeg Grenadiers)
- Last Post Fund columbaria
- Dugald Train Wreck memorial

== Notable graves ==
Notable graves at Brookside Cemetery include:

- "Bulldog Bob" Brown (1938–1997), professional wrestler
- Harry Colebourn (1887–1947), owner of Winnipeg the bear (Winnie the Pooh)
- Francis Evans Cornish (1831–1878), first mayor of Winnipeg
- Tommy Dunderdale (1887–1960), NHA hockey player
- Chris Fridfinnson (1898–1938), Olympic Games gold medalist
- Charles Gardiner (1904–1934), NHL hockey player
- Faron Hall (1964–2014), homeless man who gained notoriety after rescuing several people from drowning in several separate incidents
- Haldor Halderson (1900–1965), NHL hockey player
- Stanley Howard Knowles (1908–1997), politician (federal NDP MP)
- Friðrik Lúðvík Kristjánsson (Lúlli), Icelandic-Canadian poet
- Bill Mosienko (1921–1994), NHL hockey player
- Alfred Paget (1879–1919), silent films actor
- Gestur Pálsson (1852–1891), Icelandic author and newspaper editor
- Tommy Prince (1915–1977), Canadian war hero
- Phoenix Sinclair (2000–2005), murder victim
- Jane Elizabeth Vasey (1949–1982), blues musician
- Kurt Winter (1946–1997), musician
- the 31 victims of the 1947 rail accident in Dugald, Manitoba – buried in a large communal grave
