= Royal Commission on Corporate Concentration =

- Commissioners: Robert Bryce (Chair); Pierre Nadeau; Robert Warren Vincent Dickerson
- Inquiry period: 22 April 1975 – 17 March 1978

The Royal Commission on Corporate Concentration was a royal commission created in 1975 to study corporate concentration in Canada.

== History ==
The commission was created by the Canadian federal government under Prime Minister Pierre Trudeau through Part I of the Inquiries Act by Order in Council of 1 May 1975, P.C. 1975–999, to study corporate concentration in Canada. It was created in the wake of a failed attempt by Power Corporation of Canada to gain control over Argus Corporation.

The commission, which was chaired by retired clerk of the Privy Council of Canada Robert Broughton Bryce of Ottawa and completed by tele-journalist Pierre Nadeau of Montreal, and lawyer Robert Warren Vincent Dickerson of Vancouver, was tasked with studying the nature and effect of corporate concentration, its economic and social implications, and whether any safeguards were required to protect the public interest; Dickerson had been in 1971 the lead co-author of Proposals for a New Business Corporations Law for Canada.

The commission presented its final report in 1978, which made a number of recommendation but also concluded that no "radical changes" in laws governing corporate activity were required at the time.

== Influence ==
In 1986, the federal government of Brian Mulroney introduced the Competition Act, to change Canada's competition laws.
