= Martin S. Minuk =

Lawyer

Martin Shayne "Marty" Minuk is a Canadian defence lawyer from Winnipeg, Manitoba. He received his law degree from the University of Manitoba in 1978. Since 2005, he has been a partner at the law firm Aikins, MacAulay, and Thorvaldson.

Minuk is notable for being appointed the special prosecutor in the death of Crystal Taman. He approved a controversial plea bargain in that case, which eventually resulted in the Taman Inquiry.
