= Occupational Health and Safety Act (Ontario) =

The Occupational Health and Safety Act (OHSA), officially known as Occupational Health and Safety Act, R.S.O. 1990, c. O.1, is a piece of legislation in Ontario, Canada functioning as the core legislation designed to protect workers from occupational health and other general safety hazards on the job.

The Act establishes requirements concerning workplace health and safety, worker participation, joint health and safety committees, workplace violence and harassment, the right to refuse unsafe work, workplace inspections, enforcement and penalties for contraventions of the Act and its regulations. The act covers most workers, employers, and workplaces in different industries such as construction, manufacturing and health.

== History ==
The current Ontario OHSA framework was developed during the 1970s. In 1976, the province enacted the Employees Health and Safety Act, 1976 as interim legislation. The legislation reflected recommendations associated with the Royal Commission on the Health and Safety of Workers in Mines, including greater worker participation and shared responsibility between labor and management for occupational health and safety.

In 1977, the Ontario government introduced Bill 70, the Occupational Health and Safety Act, 1977. The proposed legislation intended to consolidate and reconcile several existing occupational health and safety legislations generated for different industries such as mining and construction with the 1976 interim legislation. The Legislative Assembly passed the legislation in December 1978 as the Occupational Health and Safety Act, 1978, chapter 83 of the Statutes of Ontario. The Act came into force in 1979. It established the framework for the current Ontario's occupational health and safety system.

== Key provisions ==
=== Worker participation ===
The OHSA is based in part on an internal responsibility system, under which responsibility for workplace health and safety is shared among workplace parties.

=== Duties of workplace parties ===
Under the Act, all parties—employers, workers and supervisors—have duties and responsibilities. Employers have duties to provide a safe workplace, provide information and instruction, maintain prescribed equipment and protective devices, and take every precaution reasonable in the circumstances for worker protection. Supervisors and workers also have statutory duties. Workers must comply with the Act and applicable regulations, use required protective equipment and report hazards and contraventions of which they are aware.

=== Right to refuse unsafe work ===
Section 43 of the act provides workers with a right to refuse work in specified circumstances where they have reason to believe that the work or workplace condition is likely to endanger them or another worker.

=== Workplace violence and harassment ===
The OHSA contains specific requirements concerning workplace violence and workplace harassment, including employer policies, programs, risk assessments, reporting procedures and investigations.

=== Enforcement and penalties ===
The Act is administered and enforced by the Ministry of Labour (Ontario). Inspectors may enter workplaces, conduct inspections and investigations, examine records and issue orders to address contraventions of the Act or its regulations.
