= Murder of Helen Betty Osborne =

1971 murder in Manitoba, Canada

Helen Osborne
- Born: Helen Betty Osborne; July 16, 1952; Norway House, Manitoba, Canada
- Died: November 13, 1971 (aged 19); The Pas, Manitoba, Canada
- Education: Margaret Barbour Collegiate
- Parents: Joe Osborne (father); Justine Osborne (née McKay) (mother)

Helen Betty Osborne (July 16, 1952 – November 13, 1971) was an Indigenous Canadian woman who was a member of the Norway House Cree Nation. In November 1971, Osborne was abducted, beaten, and murdered while walking home from the Northern Lite Cafe in The Pas, Manitoba. The horrific nature of the crime, compounded by the mishandling of the investigation by the Royal Canadian Mounted Police that prolonged solving her murder and bringing the perpetrators to justice by sixteen years, brought greater awareness of the epidemic of Missing and Murdered Indigenous Women to the Canadian public.

== Life and death ==
Helen Betty Osborne was born in Norway House, Manitoba, the eldest of 10 children born to Joe and Justine (née McKay) Osborne. She had seven brothers, Isaiah, Billy, Kelvin, Douglas, Mark, Joe, and Tommy, and two sisters, Cynthia and Cecilia. Osborne's ambition was to go to college and become a teacher, but because there was no secondary school in Norway House at the time, she had to leave home. She spent 2 years at Guy Hill Residential School outside The Pas, Manitoba, a culturally mixed town of European Canadians, Métis, and Cree people. In the fall of 1971, Osborne attended Margaret Barbour Collegiate, where she boarded with Bill and Patricia Benson, a white couple who lived two minutes away from the school.

On the evening of November 12, 1971, Osborne had spent time with friends at the Northern Lite Cafe before heading back downtown. Osborne's friends returned home around midnight, but nothing is known of Osborne's actions or whereabouts after this time. Osborne was walking home alone on November 13 at approximately 2:30 a.m. when she was abducted by four men, who forced her into a car and gang raped her. Osborne was taken to a cabin at Clearwater Lake, where she was repeatedly beaten by one of the assailants while the rest watched as they drank beer. Osborne was taken to a pump house, where she was stripped naked and stabbed to death with a screwdriver 56 times.

The next morning, Steven Gurba, his 14-year-old son Kenneth, and his friend Danny Yakiwchuk, went fishing at Clearwater Lake. Kenneth eventually grew bored and went off looking for rabbits near a parking lot at approximately 11:30 a.m. when he discovered Osborne’s body near a bush. After Gurba and his father went to a nearby airport and called the police, an investigation by the RCMP was launched.

== Murder investigation ==
During the initial investigation, Osborne's 17-year-old ex-boyfriend Cornelius Bighetty was suspected of killing her, but he was cleared after successfully passing a lie detector test. The night before her murder, Osborne and Bighetty had gotten into an argument over his infidelity and broke up. Attention was also placed on Osborne's friends, particularly 18-year-old Annaliese Dumas from Sandy Bay, Saskatchewan. Both Bighetty and Dumas were not informed of Osborne's murder until after they were shown a photo of her badly beaten face while being interrogated by the RCMP, which caused Bighetty to faint. Consequently, negligence in retrieving crucial evidence at the crime scene, as well as unequal treatment between indigenous suspects and non-indigenous suspects by the RCMP, significantly prolonged the investigation.

In May 1972, an anonymous letter implicated four men who frequently spent time together, Lee Scott Colgan, James Robert Paul Houghton, Dwayne Archie Johnston, and Norman Bernard Manger, in Osborne's murder. Attempts to locate the writer of the letter were unsuccessful until after Colgan’s arrest in October 1986. The writer was eventually identified as Catherine Dick, who was told by Colgan of his involvement in the murder. In January 1985, Annette Veito told the RCMP that Colgan had talked to her about the murder. In May 1985, Colgan's ex-wife Arlene Demmings also informed the RCMP that Colgan had discussed the murder with her several times while drunk. It was also revealed that Osborne and Colgan had previously been classmates at Margaret Barbour Collegiate.

In June 1985, Constable Robert Urbanoski took over the investigation and placed an advertisement in the Opasquia Times, the local weekly newspaper, asking for witnesses to come forward. Urbanoski became involved with the investigation by conducting a complete review of the case file, which took place from July 1983 to March 1984, and reinterviewing everyone who had been previously questioned. It wouldn't be until December 1987 that any of the suspects were convicted of the crime. However, Houghton was acquitted and Manger was never charged, while Colgan was initially charged with first-degree murder, but later received immunity from prosecution in exchange for testifying against both Houghton and Johnston. Johnston was convicted of second-degree murder and sentenced to life in prison, but he was released on parole in 1997 after serving only 10 years.

The Aboriginal Justice Implementation Commission conducted an investigation into concerns surrounding the length of time involved in solving the case. According to the Commission report, Osborne's autopsy showed that "along with well over 50 stab wounds, her skull, cheekbones and palate were broken, her lungs were damaged, and one kidney was torn. Her body showed extensive bruising." The Commission concluded that the most significant factors were racism, sexism, and indifference. The RCMP officially closed the case on February 12, 1999.

== Legacy and aftermath ==
On July 14, 2000, the government of Manitoba issued a formal apology to the Osborne family during a conference held by Gord Mackintosh, Minister of Justice and Attorney General. Mackintosh addressed the mishandling of the investigation into the case as he held hands with Osborne's sister Cecilia, saying his department did not do enough. “Many parts of the justice system failed. I’ve looked at the steps that my department took at that time, and I’m far from satisfied that we did everything we could,” said Mackintosh. The minister also announced the government would introduce legislation to establish a $50,000 scholarship in Osborne's name. Money from the Victims Assistance Fund would provide bursaries to indigenous female students who want to work in education, beginning in September 2001.

On September 22, 2004, the Norway House Cree Nation opened a mixed primary and secondary school named after Osborne, the Helen Betty Osborne Ininiw Education Resource Center, which would allow indigenous children in Norway House to stay within their community. The government of Manitoba contributed $5.8 million toward construction costs of the $43 million facility, which has enough space for 1,300 students and 150 staff members, making it one of the largest schools in Manitoba.

On May 12, 2006, during the fourth annual gala dinner at the Helen Betty Osborne Memorial Foundation, University of Winnipeg President and Vice-Chancellor Lloyd Axworthy announced that the building housing the Wii Chiiwaakanak Learning Centre would be named after Osborne. “Thanks to the hard work of her family and the Foundation that bears her name, Helen Betty Osborne stands as a symbol of hope for young Aboriginal people; her commitment to education an inspiration to us all,” said Axworthy.

On March 26, 2008, Osborne's brother, 42-year-old Kelvin John "Rose" Osborne, was assaulted at Howell Court Apartments at 661 Broadway in Winnipeg, where he was residing at the time. Osborne had been beaten with a hammer and stabbed with a knife, in addition to having his throat slit. Osborne was rushed to hospital in critical condition, where he later died from his injuries. That same day, 56-year-old former Canadian Navy member Morris Richard McConnell, was arrested and charged with second-degree murder. McConnell had gone with Osborne to his apartment suite, where Osborne propositioned McConnell for sex. McConnell responded by beating and stabbing Osborne, later going to another apartment building on the same block and telling a witness, "I think I've done something bad."

McConnell, who allegedly suffered from depression and schizophrenia, claimed he had no recollection of killing Osborne, but remembered hitting him with the hammer and seeing blood. Despite the brutal nature of the crime, the Crown determined that it shouldn't be classified as a hate crime, but rather "an act that was committed as a result of self-loathing" due to McConnell's sexual confusion. Court of Queen's Bench Associate Chief Justice Glenn Joyal agreed to a plea deal between Crown attorney Scott Cooper and McConnell's lawyer. McConnell pleaded guilty to second-degree murder and was sentenced to life in prison with the possibility of parole after 10 years. McConnell apologized to the court and to the Osborne family for his actions.

On August 20, 2009, the body of Osborne's 18-year-old cousin, Hillary Angel Wilson, also from the Norway House Cree Nation, was discovered at 3:00 p.m. by a teenage boy walking his dog at the corner of Perimeter Highway and Manitoba Highway 59 in East St. Paul, a rural municipality northeast of Winnipeg. Wilson was last seen on the evening of August 19 around 7:00 p.m. at the corner of Selkirk Avenue and McKenzie Street, where she later went to a payphone around 8:30 p.m. and made a phone call to her mother Gwen, telling her that she was spending time with friends. Her death was ruled a homicide, but no suspects have been charged in connection with her murder and the case remains unsolved. In April 2026, Osborne's brother Isaiah died and is interred at Brookside Cemetery in Winnipeg.

== Cultural references ==
Canadian indie folk band The Wooden Sky produced and released their debut studio album When Lost at Sea (2007), which included a song titled "The Lonesome Death of Helen Betty Osborne". The song was written as a tribute to Osborne and was the final track on the album.

Canadian author Robert Munsch discussed his experience of being walked to Osborne's grave one year before the perpetrators were arrested. He discussed how this single incident led to a complete evolution not only in his writing, but also in his investment into culture, the direction of his philanthropy, and his philosophy of life.

The case loosely inspired the play The Rez Sisters (1986), written by Tomson Highway. One of the main characters is Zhaboonigan Peterson, a mentally challenged woman who was gang raped by two men with a screwdriver and later performs a monologue about the assault. Highway also wrote a Cree language version of the play, Iskooniguni Iskweewuk (2010). The case had personal significance to Highway, who attended junior high school in The Pas and graduated a year before Osborne's murder.

A miniseries about the case, Conspiracy of Silence, premiered on CBC in December 1991, which was directed by Francis Mankiewicz and starred Michelle St. John as Osborne. At the 7th Gemini Awards, the series was nominated in eight categories and won seven, including Best Dramatic Miniseries. The series was the last to be directed by Mankiewicz, who died of cancer in Montreal on August 14, 1993, at the age of 49.

A poetry book, A Really Good Brown Girl, written by educator and poet Marilyn Dumont, features a poem named after Osborne. The book was published on January 1, 1996, and won the Gerald Lampert Memorial Award in 1997.

A true crime graphic novel, The Life of Helen Betty Osborne, written by David Robertson and illustrated by Madison Blackstone, was published on December 2, 2008. A reissued and retitled edition, Betty: The Helen Betty Osborne Story, illustrated by Scott B. Henderson, was published on April 27, 2015. Robertson is also a member of the Norway House Cree Nation.

== See also ==
- List of kidnappings: 1950–1979
- List of solved missing person cases: 1950–1999
- Missing and Murdered Indigenous Women
