= J. Stefan Dupré =

Canadian Political Scientist

- Born: November 3, 1936; Quebec City, Quebec, Canada
- Died: December 6, 2012 (aged 76); Sunnybrook Health Sciences Centre, Toronto, Ontario, Canada
- Education: Harvard University; University of Ottawa
- Awards: Order of Canada (1986); Order of Ontario (1992)
- Scientific career
- Fields: Political Science
- Workplaces: University of Toronto; Canadian Institute for Advanced Research
- Thesis: Fiscal policy in Newfoundland (1958)

Joseph Stefan Dupré CC OOnt (November 3, 1936 – December 6, 2012) was a Canadian political scientist, noted for his service to education and to the Government of Canada, in which he served many posts. He was a Professor Emeritus of Political Science at the University of Toronto, and served as President of the Canadian Institute for Advanced Research.

== Career ==
He received a B.A. from the University of Ottawa in 1955, a PhD in Political Economy and Government from Harvard University in 1958 at the age of 21.

He was a research fellow at the Brookings Institution in 1957. He became a professor of political science at Harvard in 1958 and a secretary of Harvard's Graduate School of Public Administration. He became a professor at the University of Toronto in 1963, a full time professor in 1966, chaired the Department of Political Economy from 1970 to 1974, and would later become the Dean of the School of Graduate Studies.

Dupré was known for his public service. Among these included being the founding chair of the Ontario Council on University Affairs from 1974 to 1977, a council that advised the provincial government on university funding and held public meetings. He was a member of the National Research Council Canada and a member of the Social Sciences and Humanities Research Council, and in that capacity would serve on various governmental committees.

He chaired a royal commission, the Royal Commission on Matters of Health and Safety Arising from the Use of Asbestos in Ontario. He served as an official advisor to the ministries of education in Alberta, British Columbia, and Nova Scotia.

Most notably, he served as president and CEO of the Canadian Institute for Advanced Research from 1996 to 2000, overseeing the institute's early work on superconductivity and gravity.

== Awards, recognition, and legacy ==
He was a recipient of the 1984 Vanier Award and became an Officer of the Order of Canada in 1986. He became a member of the Order of Ontario in 1992. He would later be awarded the 2002 Queen Elizabeth II's Golden Jubilee Medal and the 2012 Queen Elizabeth II's Diamond Jubilee Medal.

He was awarded honorary degrees from Université Laval in 1976, McMaster University in May 1977, the University of Ottawa in 1977, and the University of Toronto on December 25, 1999.

The J. Stefan Dupré Memorial Scholarship in Canadian Politics and the J. Stefan Dupré Book Prize awarded to political science students at the University of Toronto are named after him.

== Personal life ==
He was born on November 3, 1936, in Quebec City. He married Anne Louise in 1963. They had two children, Sam Barret and Maurice Robert.

He died on December 6, 2012, of chronic obstructive pulmonary disease at Sunnybrook Hospital at the age of 76.

== Selected publications ==
- Science and the Nation: Policies and Politics
- Intergovernmental Relations and the Metropolitan Area
- Fiscal Policy in Newfoundland
- Report to the Workers' Compensation Board on the Ontario Uranium Mining Industry
- Intergovernmental Finance in Ontario: A Provincial-Local Perspective; A Study
- Federalism and Policy Development: The Case of Adult Occupational Training in Ontario
