= Royal Commission on New Reproductive Technologies =

- Also known as: Baird Commission
- Commissioners: Patricia Baird (Chair); Grace Jantzen; Bartha Maria Knoppers; Susan E. M. McCutcheon; Suzanne Rozell Scorsone
- Inquiry period: 25 October 1989 – 15 November 1993
- Authorized: Order in Council P.C. 1989-2150

The Royal Commission on New Reproductive Technologies, often referred to as the "Baird Commission", was created by the Canadian federal government under Brian Mulroney in 1989 to study the ethical, social, research, and legal implications of new reproductive technologies in Canada. The Canadian government, along with many other citizens, had grown increasingly concerned about the impact of in vitro fertilization and other rapidly progressing technologies. The commission was chaired by Patricia Baird. It published its final report in 1993, which was presented to the Canadian Governor General. The report later served the basis for the federal statute, the Assisted Human Reproduction Act.
