= Rural Municipality of East St. Paul =

Rural municipality in Manitoba, Canada

East St. Paul
- Rural municipality
- Rural Municipality of East St. Paul
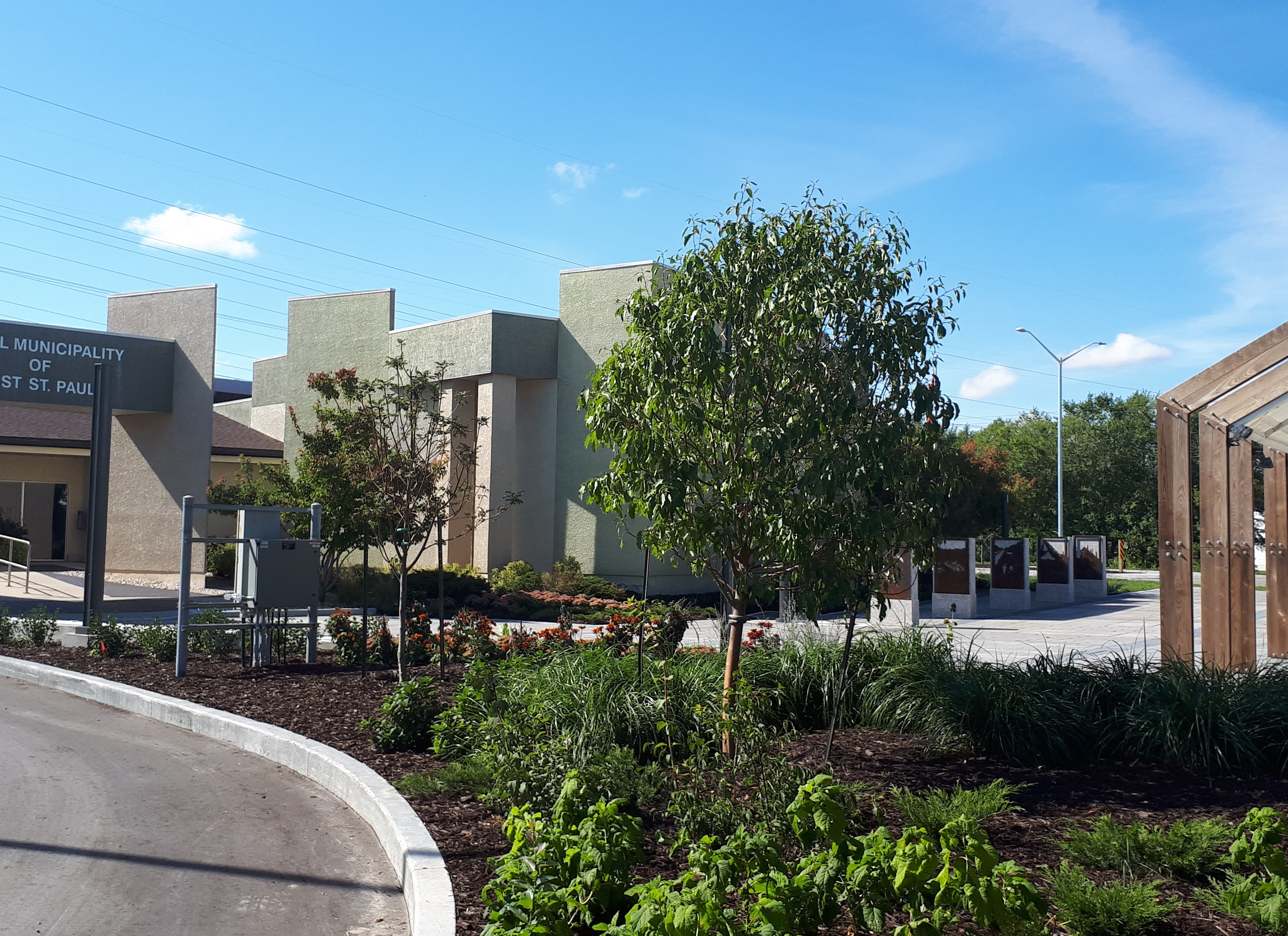
- East St. Paul municipal office

- Location of the RM of East St. Paul in Manitoba
- Coordinates: 49°58′38″N 97°00′37″W
- Canada: Canada
- Province: Manitoba
- Region: Interlake and Winnipeg Metro
- Founded (St. Paul): 1888
- Incorporated (East St. Paul): October 23, 1915; 111 years ago

Government
  - Mayor: Mike Watson
  - MLA Red River North: Jeff Wharton

Area
  - Total: 41.79 km^{2} (16.14 sq mi)
- Elevation: 233 m (764 ft)

Population (2021)
  - Total: 9,725
  - Density: 232.7/km^{2} (602.7/sq mi)
- Time zone: UTC-6 (CST)
  - Summer (DST): UTC-5 (CDT)
- Forward sortation area: R2E
- Area codes: 204, 431
- Website: http://www.eaststpaul.com/

East St. Paul is a rural municipality (RM) in Manitoba, Canada. It is located north-east of and adjacent to the city of Winnipeg, and is part of the Winnipeg Metropolitan Area. The municipality was formed on November 3, 1915, when the municipality of St. Paul (1888–1914) was subdivided into West St. Paul and East St. Paul, with the Red River acting as the dividing line.

It encompasses 41 square kilometres (16 mi^{2}). In 2016, there were 9,372 persons living in the RM of East St. Paul, making it the most densely-populated RM in Manitoba at 223.2 inhabitants per square kilometre (578/sq mi).

== History ==
In 1880, the Rural Municipality of St. Paul was established, with offices located on the west side of the Red River. The barrier created by the river within the RM made doing business an inconvenience, as those on the east side had to travel over water to the west side. There were no bridges in the vicinity; the closest being Winnipeg's Redwood Bridge about 9 kilometres to the south. The population was growing: as more families arrived to settle in the area, community spirit grew. On the east side of the river, schools and businesses were started. The community became diversified with industry ranging from market gardening to general stores.

On November 3, 1915, the Rural Municipalities of East St. Paul and West St. Paul officially received royal assent. The first meeting of the RM of East St. Paul took place on January 4, 1916, in a room in secretary-treasurer Walter Gorham’s house at 2051 Roseneath Avenue. In 1951, a one-story building was erected at 2127 Birds Hill Road. In 1980, the current municipal office complex was built at 3021 Birds Hill Road.

== Geography ==
East St. Paul includes the communities of Birds Hill, North Hill, Glengarry, River East Estates, Whidbey Harbour, Pritchard Farm Estates, and Silverfox Estates. Historic Henderson Highway follows the Red River through East St. Paul areas settled by the Red River Settlers. The Red River Floodway diverts part of the Red River's flow around the city of Winnipeg and through East St. Paul and discharges it back into the Red River north of the dam in Lockport. The Trans Canada Trail and the Duff Roblin Parkway Trail also pass through East St. Paul.

East St. Paul has a gated community for seniors and new home development is underway at Countryside Crossing, By The Park, Prairie Ridge, Southlands Drive and Deerfield.

East St. Paul contains greenhouses and numerous small farms, primarily of the market gardening variety, as well as natural forest, creek and pond areas.

The population growth of East St. Paul has slowed significantly in recent years. Like other surrounding communities, the municipality has historically attracted people from Winnipeg and elsewhere due to its close proximity to Winnipeg, the larger properties, lower rates of property tax, and semi-rural atmosphere.

In 2017, Manitoba Communities in Bloom (MCIB) awarded the R.M. of East St. Paul a Heritage Canada 150 Special Edition Award for its heritage conservation, and recognized its tidiness efforts, environmental action, urban forestry, landscaping, and floral displays. In 2019, MCIB awarded the municipality a special mention for its farmers' market.

== Demographics ==
Historical population
Year	Pop.	±%
1981	3,596	—
1986	4,385	+21.9%
1996	6,437	+46.8%
2001	7,677	+19.3%
2006	8,733	+13.8%
2011	9,046	+3.6%
2016	9,372	+3.6%
2021	9,725	+3.8%

In the 2021 Census of Population conducted by Statistics Canada, East St. Paul had a population of 9,725 living in 3,464 of its 3,504 total private dwellings, a change of 3.8% from its 2016 population of 9,372. With a land area of 41.79 km^{2} (16.14 sq mi), it had a population density of 232.7/km^{2} (602.7/sq mi) in 2021.

Panethnic groups in the Rural Municipality of East St. Paul (2001−2021)
Panethnic group	2021		2016		2011		2006		2001	
Panethnic group	Pop.	%	Pop.	%	Pop.	%	Pop.	%	Pop.	%
European (Note: Statistic includes all persons that did not make up part of a visible minority or an indigenous identity.)	8,340	85.76%	8,475	90.45%	8,500	93.97%	8,240	94.39%	7,370	96.03%
Indigenous	705	7.25%	470	5.02%	295	3.26%	230	2.63%	215	2.8%
Southeast Asian (Note: Statistic includes total responses of "Filipino" and "Southeast Asian" under visible minority section on census.)	200	2.06%	110	1.17%	45	0.5%	65	0.74%	10	0.13%
South Asian	190	1.95%	75	0.8%	60	0.66%	80	0.92%	35	0.46%
East Asian (Note: Statistic includes total responses of "Chinese", "Korean", and "Japanese" under visible minority section on census.)	100	1.03%	60	0.64%	75	0.83%	40	0.46%	30	0.39%
Latin American	50	0.51%	25	0.27%	20	0.22%	20	0.23%	10	0.13%
African	40	0.41%	60	0.64%	25	0.28%	30	0.34%	10	0.13%
Middle Eastern (Note: Statistic includes total responses of "West Asian" and "Arab" under visible minority section on census.)	0	0%	45	0.48%	0	0%	10	0.11%	0	0%
Other/multiracial (Note: Statistic includes total responses of "Visible minority, n.i.e." and "Multiple visible minorities" under visible minority section on census.)	90	0.93%	60	0.64%	0	0%	20	0.23%	25	0.33%
Total responses	9,725	100%	9,370	99.98%	9,045	99.99%	8,730	99.97%	7,675	99.97%
Total population	9,725	100%	9,372	100%	9,046	100%	8,733	100%	7,677	100%
Note: Totals greater than 100% due to multiple origin responses

== Water ==
An underground carbonate aquifer provides water services to the R.M. Water is pumped via two well sites, one at Oasis Rd. just east of the Floodway, the other at Wenzel Street. Constructed in 1995, Wenzel Street. is the site of the Water Treatment Plant, Reservoir and the PW 7 well. The Reservoir has a capacity of 530,000 lgal as of 2003.

A well field, consisting of four wells, PW 1 (drilled February 1995), PW 4 (drilled October 1995), PW 5 (drilled November 2000) and PW 6 (drilled November 2000), at the Oasis Rd. site have provided the R.M. with water services. PW 5 at Wenzel Street was opened in 2005 and is used only during emergencies. PW 7 at Wenzel was drilled in February 2004. To meet growing demand, an additional well at Oasis Rd., PW 8, was added in July 2007. In that year, the water system served 770 of 3,100 residences.

In September 2013, the R.M. applied to the Manitoba government to add a well at Bray Road and PTH 202 and to send this water to the Wenzel Water Treatment Plant.

== Recreation ==
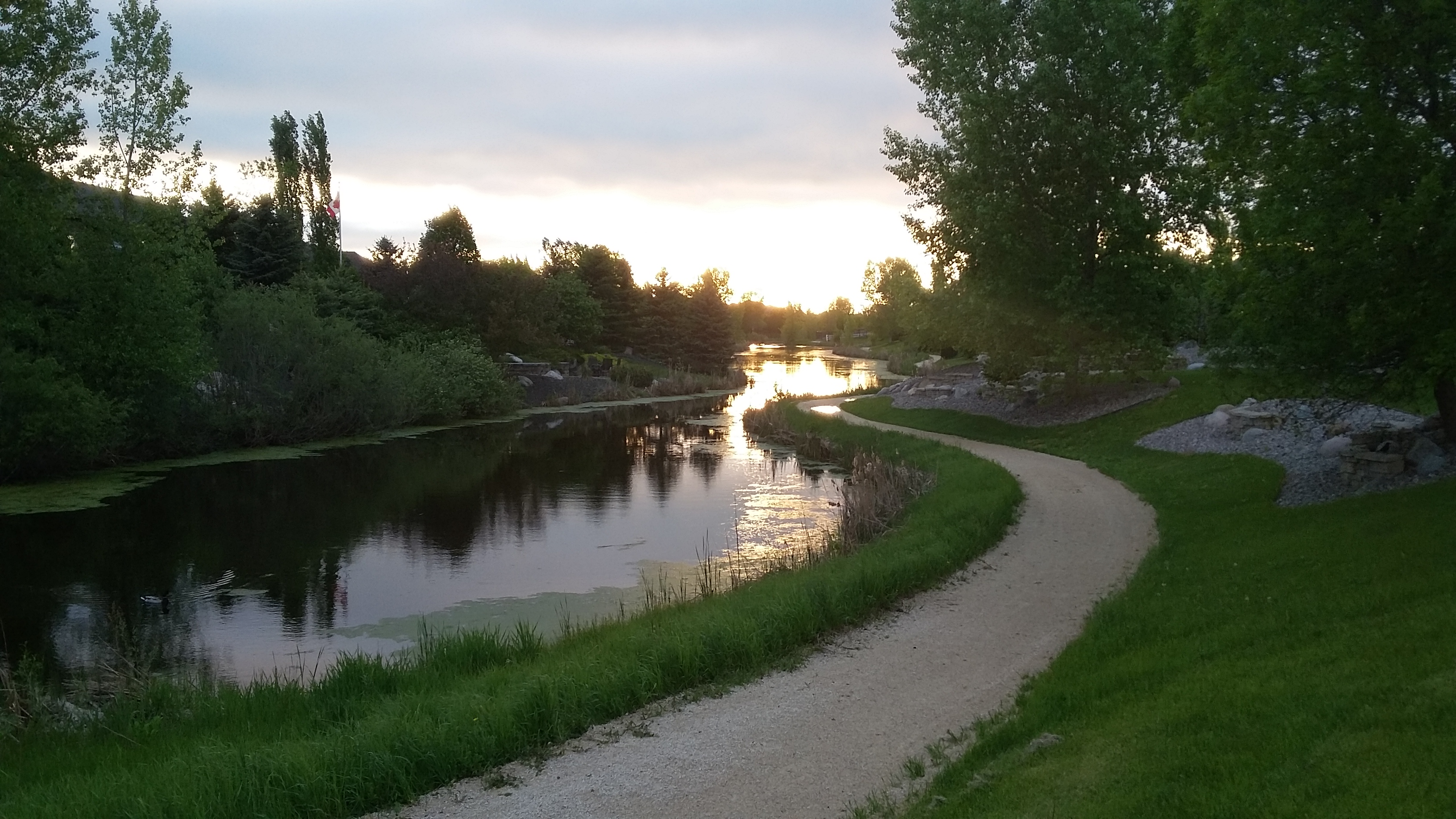
Eagle Creek path in East St. Paul, Manitoba.

Hyland Park was established in the early 20th century by Winnipeg businessman J. L. Hyland as a destination for tourists riding aboard his two Red River steamboats Bonnitoba and Winnitoba and later, the Lockport, following the ruin of both ships. The Hyland Navigation and Trading Company (HNTC) built a built a lengthy dock along the Red River, to which multiple round trips were made per day from their Winnipeg docks at Lusted Avenue to accommodate the attraction’s popularity.

In 1914, a barge previously used by the Arctic Ice Company was purchased, renovated into a floating pavilion and dance hall complete with an orchestra, and moored in the river near the park dock. Park admission in 1914 was set at 50 cents for adults and 25 cents for children, while access to the floating dance hall was free with a sanctioned boat trip ticket, without which admission to the dance hall was another 25 cents. The property, complete with multiple pavilions and a dining hall, was considered a family park and maintained a strict no-alcohol policy. Activities came to an end following the summer season of 1915, due to a combination of the First World War, financial difficulties, and a series of disasters including the ruin of both steamships. Over the following few years, the park was occasionally used by groups for special outings. Years later, the property was acquired by the Imperial Oil Limited. On June 18, 1975, Tourism Minister Rene Toupin announced the company had donated the property to the Province of Manitoba. Under formal agreement a year later, the $150,000 property exchanged hands for $1. A commemorative monument was erected, park amenities including a boat launch were installed, and the site operated as a provincial wayside park for a time, before eventually being transferred to the municipality which manages it.

In 1958, 180 residents built the East St. Paul Curling Club. There is a plaque in the building that identifies all the residents that contributed a $100 debenture so that funds could be raised for the club. In 1960, residents again got together and built an outdoor hockey rink on land donated by the municipality, right behind the curling rink. East St. Paul's recreation centre offers curling, outdoor and indoor ice hockey, summer pickleball, other fitness programs, and there is an outdoor recreation complex for skateboarding, soccer and baseball fields. Tennis courts are used by residents and non-residents in the summer, as well as a toboggan hill and outdoor skating on a frozen lake in the winter. In addition to the Trans Canada Trail and the Duff Roblin Parkway Trail, the municipality contains several other walking trails and pathways, like the Bottomly Creek Trail and the Pritchard Farm Trails, as well as numerous parks and playgrounds.

A habitat rehabilitation project at Birds Hill, Manitoba transformed a depleted gravel pit into Silver Springs Park, with trails, a lake, and homes built along part of its perimeter. The pit dates to the late 19th century, when the Canadian Pacific Railway needed gravel ballast for its rail lines. The deposit was later worked to serve Winnipeg's needs for aggregate. Over the years, more than 20 million tonnes of gravel were removed from the site. The depleted quarry was graded and landscaped with native grasses and more than 1,200 trees and shrubs. Geese, ducks, terns, gulls, American white pelicans, songbirds, foxes, rabbits, western painted turtles, muskrats and deer are frequently observed. In 2020 Silver Springs Park was renamed Swistun Family Heritage Park to recognize the prominent local family that was responsible for the rehabilitation of the quarry as a park, its landscaping, and establishment of ponds. In 1993, the Province of Manitoba profiled the project as what can be achieved with mining rehabilitation, and brought in a 10 cent charge for every ton extracted out of a mine or gravel pit. In 2021, this park was nationally recognized with the Butchart Gardens Land Reclamation Award by the Canadian Communities in Bloom.

== Policing ==
East St. Paul made national news in 2005 with the poor handling by East St. Paul Police and subsequent inquiry into death of Crystal Taman by an off duty Winnipeg police officer Derek Harvey-Zenk. It was believed that the police officer was driving drunk when his truck rear-ended Taman, who was stopped at a red light. The East St. Paul police officers at the scene knew the offender, did not gather adequate evidence, and the prosecutor was forced to plea bargain a relatively light sentence. As a result of the evidence presented at the Taman Inquiry, the province disbanded the East St. Paul police force, replacing them with Royal Canadian Mounted Police officers. This change from a local police force to RCMP resulted in several changes, most notable is the cost of policing. Prior to the changeover, the RM of East St. Paul paid for its local police force; however since the change to RCMP in January 2009, the costs of policing has been paid for by the provincial and federal governments. The RCMP police detachment remains in the original location as the East St. Paul police force. The traffic light and intersection was replaced in 2018 by an interchange, realigning the Perimeter Highway and Highway 59 to allow traffic flow without interruption and improve safety.

== Communication ==
East St. Paul along with neighbouring municipalities West St. Paul and St. Clements were jointly awarded in 2016 an Honourable Mention in the Organization of the Year category for their success in improving public participation and communication from the International Association of Public Participation (IAP2). According to the IAP2, in the past three years, these municipalities have evolved from places where IAP2 principles were effectively unknown to becoming P2 champions and leaders on enhancing transparency, public buy-in and trust through public participation. Public concerns have been addressed and strong mandates were secured on a variety of projects, from recreation, roads, and farmers markets to major sewer initiatives.
