= Robert Bryce =

Canadian civil servant

The Honourable Robert Broughton Bryce PC, CC, FRSC
- Bryce in 1984

Clerk of the Privy Council
- In office January 1, 1954 – June 30, 1963
- Preceded by: Jack Pickersgill
- Succeeded by: Robert Gordon Robertson

Personal details
- Born: February 27, 1910 Toronto, Ontario
- Died: July 30, 1997 (aged 87) Ottawa, Ontario
- Profession: Economist, civil servant

Robert Broughton Bryce, PC CC FRSC, (February 27, 1910 – July 30, 1997) was a Canadian civil servant.

== Biography ==
After graduating with engineering degree from the University of Toronto, Bryce undertook graduate studies in economics at University of Cambridge, where he was influenced by the ideas of John Maynard Keynes. In the fall of 1935, he left Britain for Harvard University where, as a graduate student, he introduced Keynesian economics in the United States, with the help of fellow Canadian Lorie Tarshis. According to John Kenneth Galbraith, Joseph Schumpeter "called Keynes Allah and Bryce his Prophet".

Bryce started working for the Department of Finance in 1938, later becoming assistant deputy minister of Finance and Secretary to the Treasury Board. In 1954, he became clerk of the Privy Council and Secretary to the Cabinet. He retired in 1968 as deputy minister of Finance.

== Works ==
He is the author of Maturing in Hard Times: Canada's Department of Finance Through the Great Depression (McGill-Queen's Press, 1986, ISBN 0-7735-0555-5). His other book, Canada and the Cost of World War II: The International Operations of Canada's Department of Finance, 1939-1947 (McGill-Queen's University Press, 2005, ISBN 0-7735-2938-1), edited by Matthew J. Bellamy, was published after his death.

Leading a group of long-serving bureaucrats who gave Canadian government a sense of stability and consistency, Bryce served as secretary to the cabinet and clerk of the Privy Council under Liberal Louis Saint-Laurent and Conservative John Diefenbaker for nine years (1954–1963). This group continued through five administrations, from Mackenzie King to Pierre Trudeau. Bryce was appointed to chair the Royal Commission on Corporate Concentration in May 1975. He resigned due to illness before its completion, and can be considered to be one of the authors of the report.

== Honours ==
In 1968, he was made a Companion of the Order of Canada "for his services to Canada in various important posts of public administration".

He received honorary Doctor of Laws degrees from the University of Manitoba (1961), the University of Saskatchewan (1970), Mount Allison University (1970) and the University of British Columbia (1980).
