= Lúðvík Kristjánsson =

Icelandic-Canadian poet

Friðrik Lúðvík Kristján Kristjánsson (8 May 1887 – 5 October 1958), better known as Lúðvík Kristjánsson or Lúlli, was an Icelandic-Canadian poet. He was born at Víkurgerði in Fáskrúðsfjörður in the Eastfjords of Iceland. He immigrated to Canada in 1903 from Hóll in Stöðvarfjörður, joining his mother, Kristín Björnsdóttir Vium, who had immigrated to Canada the previous year. He worked as a plasterer in Winnipeg and the Interlake region of Manitoba. He married Guðný Gestsdóttir in 1921, and the couple had seven children.

Lúðvík's poetry was regularly published in Icelandic-Canadian immigrant papers Lögberg and Heimskringla (later Lögberg-Heimskringla). In 1925, his comic poem Brennubragur was published in Winnipeg. It memorializes a fire at the Icelandic Good Templars Hall on Sargent Avenue, which broke out in January 1925 but was successfully brought under control. Like Brennubragur, most of Lúðvík's poems were comic or satirical.

A volume of collected poems by Lúðvík Kristjánsson, Ljóðakorn, was published in Winnipeg in 1983.
