= John Joseph Harper =

Canadian aboriginal leader from Wasagamack, Manitoba (1951–1988)

- Born: John Joseph Harper; 30 December 1951; Wasagamack, Manitoba, Canada
- Died: 9 March 1988 (aged 36); Winnipeg, Manitoba, Canada
- Children: 3

John Joseph "J.J." Harper (December 30, 1951 – March 9, 1988) was a Canadian aboriginal leader from Wasagamack, Manitoba, who was shot and killed by Winnipeg police constable Constable Robert Cross on March 9, 1988. That event, along with the murder of Helen Betty Osborne, sparked the Aboriginal Justice Inquiry.

During an altercation between Police and Harper, Cross shot and killed Harper. It was initially ruled an accident; however, a strong public outcry lead to the Aboriginal Justice Inquiry (Name of Inquiry). The inquiry eventually concluded that Cross had used excessive force in the fatal confrontation.

== Personal life ==
Harper was a member of the Wasagamack First Nation. He was also executive director of the Island Lake Tribal Council and a leader in Manitoba's indigenous community. He and his wife Lois had three children together. On August 2, 2008, over 20 years after Harper was killed, his nephew Craig McDougall was also shot and killed by Winnipeg Police.

== Legacy ==
In 1994, Prairie Theatre Exchange produced William Harrar's play Inquest about the police response to the shooting. Two years later, Layne Coleman and Sandra Oh appeared in a Factory Theatre production of Harrar's play.

Harper's shooting was described in a 1999 book, Cowboys & Indians: The Killing of J.J. Harper, written by Winnipeg Free Press columnist Gordon Sinclair Jr., and later a 2003 television movie by the same name. It was directed by Norma Bailey and starred Adam Beach as Harper.
