= Taman Inquiry =

Crystal Taman
- Born: Crystal Ann Taman Sveinson; August 22, 1964; Kamloops, British Columbia, Canada
- Died: February 25, 2005 (aged 40); Winnipeg, Manitoba, Canada

The Taman Inquiry into the Investigation and Prosecution of Derek Harvey-Zenk was the 2008 Manitoba provincial government inquiry into the death of Crystal Taman.

Taman was killed in 2005 by Derek Harvey-Zenk, an off-duty Winnipeg police officer who was driving drunk when his truck rear-ended Taman, who was stopped at a red light. The inquiry heard testimony between June 2 and August 14, 2008.

== Incident and investigation ==
On February 25, 2005, in East St. Paul near Winnipeg, a truck driven by 31-year-old Derek Harvey-Zenk, a Constable with the Winnipeg Police Service, rear-ended and killed Crystal Taman, a 40-year-old mother of three, while she was stopped at a red light. The crash also injured a second woman, the wife of a Winnipeg police inspector.

The accident was initially investigated by East St. Paul police, led by Police Chief Harry Bakema. It would later be revealed that Harvey-Zenk and Bakema had previously worked together at the Winnipeg Police Service.

Paramedics attending the scene reported that they smelled alcohol on Harvey-Zenk's breath.

== Charges and plea deal ==
A week later, Harvey-Zenk was charged with impaired driving causing death, refusing a breathalyser test, dangerous operation of a motor vehicle causing death, and criminal negligence causing death. The provincial government appointed a private Winnipeg lawyer, Marty Minuk, special prosecutor for the case to avoid any potential conflicts of interest between the police and regular crown attorneys.

In July 2007, however, Harvey-Zenk pled guilty in a plea bargain to dangerous driving causing death (a lesser charge) and the other charges were dropped. Despite reservations from the trial judge, Chief Judge Ray Wyant, he was given a conditional sentence of "two years less a day", to be served at his home. He also resigned as a police officer.

Public outcry over the plea and allegations that the investigation had been botched led to a provincial inquiry, which began in June 2008.

== The inquiry ==
The inquiry, led by Roger Salhany, Q.C., former justice of the Ontario Superior Court, heard almost two months of conflicting testimony, which suggested an inadequate investigation by police had forced Minuk, the special prosecutor, into the controversial plea bargain.

Testimony revealed that Harvey-Zenk had spent the evening with other officers at a local restaurant and the home of another officer. Despite reports from the accident scene that Harvey-Zenk smelled of liquor, officers with him that evening denied having seen him drinking. Furthermore, a waitress who served the officers liquor throughout the evening testified that she was pressured to not "remember too much" by the restaurant's manager, who was "friends" with the officers. In response to the allegations other officers covered for Harvey-Zenk, Police Chief Keith McCaskill volunteered to testify, instructing his officers to "be truthful". (McCaskill was not chief at the time of the accident.)

Officers involved in the investigation denied that they gave preferential treatment to Harvey-Zenk. Likewise, the prosecution has denied there were any favours given to the defence.

The inquiry's final report was released in October 2008 and contained 14 recommendations. These recommendations included reforms to the manner police are investigated for crimes and resolving potential conflict of interest, increased training and implementation of victim impact statements, new guidelines for making plea bargains and increased training of the East St. Paul police. The province has claimed to have implemented most of these recommendations; however they chose to disband the East St. Paul police, replacing them with Royal Canadian Mounted Police officers, rather than offer training.

== See also ==
- Aboriginal Justice Inquiry
