= Phoenix Sinclair =

Five-year-old Canadian girl who was murdered by her mother and stepfather

- Phoenix Sinclair in early 2005
- Born: 23 April 2000; Winnipeg, Manitoba, Canada
- Died: 11 June 2005 (aged 5); Fisher River Cree Nation, Manitoba, Canada
- Resting place: Brookside Cemetery

Phoenix Victoria Hope Sinclair (23 April 2000 – 11 June 2005) was a Canadian five-year-old girl who was murdered by her mother and stepfather. The circumstances of her life and death resulted in the Inquiry into the Circumstances Surrounding the Death of Phoenix Sinclair, one of the largest public inquiries ever held in Manitoba, examining the child welfare system.

== Biography ==
Phoenix Sinclair was born on 23 April 2000 in Winnipeg, Manitoba, Canada, to Samantha Kematch and Steve Sinclair. Her father chose her name. Both of her parents had previous involvement with child welfare authorities, and Kematch had a previous child who was a permanent ward of the state. Phoenix was immediately placed in the custody of the Child and Family Services (CFS) agency, as her parents were assessed as being unprepared to care for a baby. She was first housed in a temporary shelter and later with foster parents, where her parents were allowed visitation rights. Phoenix was returned to her parents in September, with conditions including that they receive training on how to care for children and supervision from social services; however, according to the inquiry on Phoenix's case, the training and assessment provided by CFS was inadequate. Phoenix's sister, Echo, was born 29 April 2001, at which point another CFS assessment was made, but no change in custody was ordered. Police responded to a domestic violence call at the family home in June 2001; the couple had reportedly separated by early July 2001, with Steve Sinclair caring for both girls. Echo died of a respiratory infection on 15 July.

As of summer 2001, Phoenix's case had been referred to CFS on several occasions. The agency considered Steve Sinclair to be the "primary caregiver" of record for Phoenix. However, during this period she spent most of her time at the home of Kim Edwards, a family friend. The agency's file on Phoenix was closed in early 2002, but another was opened when Phoenix was hospitalized in February 2003, as medical personnel expressed concerns regarding possible neglect. At the time of her hospitalization, she had had a foreign body (a piece of Styrofoam) lodged in her nose for nearly four months, and staff did not know whether her father would provide her with the necessary antibiotics to deal with the resulting infection. She was taken into custody by CFS in June 2003 and placed in the temporary guardianship of Kim Edwards in early July.

In April 2004, Samantha Kematch took Phoenix from Edwards for what was to be a temporary visit. Around this time, Kematch became involved with Karl "Wes" McKay, and Phoenix began living full-time with the couple; Steve Sinclair left the province to live in Ontario. Phoenix was registered at Wellington School for nursery school in fall 2004, but school personnel reported never encountering either her or Kematch. New CFS files were opened for the family in November 2004, when the couple had another baby, and in March 2005 after reports of abuse; both were quickly closed. McKay and Kematch moved to Fisher River Cree Nation in April 2005, taking with them Phoenix, their other child, and a twelve-year-old son of McKay's from a previous relationship; a second son (aged 14) also lived with them occasionally. Another CFS file was opened in May 2005 after someone claiming to be a relative called the agency with concerns of possible neglect.

On 11 June 2005, Phoenix Sinclair died. In the period leading up to her death, she had been physically and verbally abused by both McKay and Kematch. She was made to sleep in a cold basement, was given very little food, and was forced to eat her own vomit. McKay shot her with a BB gun and frequently played a "game" called "choking the chicken" in which he would strangle Phoenix until she lost consciousness. According to his testimony, on the day Phoenix died McKay's 12-year-old son saw his father beat her continuously for over 15 minutes as her mother looked on; when the pair left the house, the boy found that Phoenix was not breathing.

== Aftermath ==
McKay's sons were returned to their mother in Winnipeg by CFS in July 2005. McKay and Kematch also returned to the city with their baby in late 2005, and had a second child together in December; they continued to claim welfare funds for Phoenix, and told acquaintances that the girl was living with her father or another relative. In early March 2006, McKay's sons and their mother reported Phoenix's death to police. McKay and Kematch were arrested after trying to pass off another girl as Phoenix. Phoenix's body was found at the landfill at Fisher River on 18 March. The couple were convicted of first-degree murder in late 2008 and sentenced to life imprisonment. The convictions were later confirmed on appeal. Phoenix was buried in Brookside Cemetery in Winnipeg in April 2009.

An official inquiry into the case of Phoenix Sinclair was announced in October 2006 but was delayed until the completion of legal proceedings against Kematch and McKay. The Manitoba Government and General Employees' Union (MGEU), which represents the social workers employed by CFS, filed a challenge to the province's authority to convene an inquiry on the case in early 2012, but the challenge was dismissed, as was a later attempt to impose a publication ban on the names of the social workers involved. The inquiry officially began on 5 September 2012 but was delayed by further legal challenges; it resumed in November. Further delays arose in February and March 2013 concerning a conflict of interest problem for some lawyers involved and a publication ban on the name of McKay's sons and their mother (which was granted). The inquiry was finally completed in July 2013 and the final report released in January 2014. All told, the inquiry cost Can$10–14 million, making it one of the largest and most expensive in Manitoba history.

The inquiry report, written by commissioner Ted Hughes, made "62 recommendations for improving the child welfare system and is a call out to address 'deeply rooted' issues". He also recommended changes to the provincial school curricula and to programs for supporting those on welfare, among others. The province of Manitoba announced that it had or was planning to implement many of the suggested changes, and issued a formal apology, stating that "the child welfare system failed Phoenix Sinclair".

Hughes concluded that

To truly honour Phoenix, we need to provide all of Manitoba's children with a good start in life, and offer to the most vulnerable an escape from the cycle of poverty and vulnerability... The public interest that this Inquiry has received encourages me in the belief that achievement of the better protection of all Manitoba's children, and especially the most vulnerable, will be the true legacy of Phoenix Sinclair.
