= Merlin Nunn =

Canadian judge (1930–2020)

Daniel Merlin Nunn (1930 – May 21, 2020) was a Canadian judge and government official. He was chief justice of the Supreme Court of Nova Scotia from 1982 to 2005 and Nova Scotia's conflict of interest commissioner.

Nunn was born in 1930 and graduated from St. Francis Xavier University and Dalhousie University. He earned a graduate degree in law from Harvard University.

He was the commissioner of the Nunn Commission on the youth criminal justice system in Nova Scotia.
