= Ontario's Long-Term Care COVID-19 Commission =

Commission to investigate spread of COVID

Ontario's Long-Term Care COVID-19 Commission was a commission started in July 2020 to investigate the spread of COVID-19 in Long Term Care Homes in Ontario, the impact on the staff and residents and what was done to mitigate the spread. It was created under section 78 of the Health Protection and Promotion Act.

The commission's members were Frank Marrocco who was also the chair, Angela Coke who was a former senior executive within Ontario's public service, and Dr. Jack Kitts who was a veteran of the healthcare system.

== Mandate ==
The commission's mandate was to within the boundaries of section 78 of the Health Protection and Promotion Act how the state of Ontario's Long-Term Care system before COVID effected the spread of COVID, the suitableness of the measures taken to stop the spread, the effect of the government's long-term care reforms and any other measure related to COVID in long-term care.

The commission had access to any evidence available to it under section 33 of the Public Inquiries Act, 2009. This included the ability to summon witnesses to testify under oath and compel people to provide access to documents. The commission ended up interviewing more than 700 witnesses.

== Findings ==
On April 30, 2021, the commission released its 322-page-long final report. A key finding was that, "Ontario had no plan to address pandemic or protect residents in long-term care." The report also found that Ontario was not prepared for a pandemic and chronic under funding and staffing shortages lead to deaths. Ontario had failed to learn from SARS. The workforce did not have sufficient training in infection control measures. The commission said that more facilities would be needed due to an aging population and Ontario should prepare for a future pandemic. The commission had found that Ontario had acted too slowly and the Chief Medical Officer of Health was particularly slow when it came to responding to new information. Workers lacked proper Personal Protective Equipment and the state for residents was like solitary confinement.

=== Response ===
The NDP who were the official opposition at the time, said Ford had failed to live up to his promise to an "iron ring" around Long-term care. Sharleen Stewart, an executive at SEIU Healthcare also said the government failed to live up to its promise of an iron ring around Long-term care.

The government's response was the Providing More Care, Protecting Seniors, and Building More Beds Act, 2021.
