= Cornwall Inquiry =

Canadian government inquiry

The Cornwall Inquiry was a commission of inquiry that was established by the Government of Ontario on April 14, 2005 "to inquire into and report on the events surrounding allegations of abuse of young people" in Cornwall, Ontario, by local police, Crown attorneys, probation officers, Roman Catholic clergy, and other adults in positions of trust.

Commissioner G. Normand Glaude, a former member of the Ontario Police Commission, categorically refused to make a conclusive finding of fact as to whether a child sex ring existed or whether there was a conspiracy by people in authority to cover up child sexual abuse. Such a finding was not within the scope of the inquiry. The commission found systemic failures in the response of the justice system to child sexual abuse claims.

The commission took four years to conclude, including three years of public hearings, at a cost of $53 million. Around 60% of the costs went to defraying legal fees for accused pedophiles, sexual abuse victims and the Diocese of Alexandria-Cornwall.
