= James Driskell =

Canadian man wrongfully convicted of murder

James Patrick Driskell (born 1959) is a Canadian born in Ontario who was wrongfully convicted of the murder of Perry Harder in 1991.

Driskell's trial and conviction led to a commission of inquiry in 2006.

== The crime and prosecution ==
Harder was last seen outside his rooming house in a pickup truck and his remains were found in a shallow grave just outside Winnipeg, Manitoba, Canada, three months after his disappearance. Harder had been shot at least once.

Harder and Driskell had previously been charged with possession of stolen goods, and the Crown's theory was that Driskell had committed the murder in order to prevent Harder from testifying against him.

The only physical evidence linking Driskell to the crime were three hairs found in his van that supposedly belonged to the victim. DNA tests showed years later that not only did the hairs in fact not belong to Harder, but they weren't even related to each other.

== Later years ==
On 3 March 2005, Minister of Justice and Attorney General of Canada Irwin Cotler used a special provision of the Criminal Code to quash the conviction, stay the charges, and order a new trial for Driskell, but the Manitoba Department of Justice decided not to order a new trial. It instead entered a stay of proceedings and called for a public inquiry, ending Driskell's conviction without exonerating him.

Driskell had been free on bail since late 2003, after serving a total of 12 years in Stony Mountain Penitentiary convicted of first-degree murder. Driskell's lawyers were James Lockyer and Alan Libman, both prominent defence lawyers working with the Association in Defence of the Wrongly Convicted.

The Commission of Inquiry Into Certain Aspects of the Trial and Conviction of James Driskell began April 4, 2006. Commissioner was The Honourable Patrick LeSage, Q.C. The inquiry was completed, and the findings and recommendations of the Inquiry were provided to Attorney General of Manitoba, Dave Chomiak, on January 30, 2007. In 2008, Driskell was awarded over $4 million compensation.

== See also ==
- Overturned convictions in Canada
- List of miscarriage of justice cases
