= Royal Commission on Aboriginal Peoples =

1991 Canadian royal commission

The Royal Commission on Aboriginal Peoples (RCAP) was a Canadian royal commission established in 1991 with the aim of investigating the relationship between Indigenous peoples in Canada, the Government of Canada, and Canadian society as a whole. It was launched in response to status and rights issues brought to light following events such as the Oka Crisis and the failure of the Meech Lake Accord. The commission culminated in a final report of 4,000 pages, published in 1996 and set out a 20-year agenda for implementing recommended changes.

== Scope ==
The Commission of Inquiry investigated the evolution of the relationship among Aboriginal peoples (First Nations, Inuit and Métis), the Government of Canada, Indian and Northern Affairs Canada and part of the Culture of Canada as a whole. It proposed specific solutions, rooted in domestic and international experience, to the problems which have plagued those relationships and which confront Aboriginal peoples today. The Commission examined many issues which it deems to be relevant to any or all of the Aboriginal peoples in Canada. The study of the historical relations between the government and Aboriginal people, in order to determine the possibility of Aboriginal self-government, and the legal status of previous agreements that included, the Royal Proclamation of 1763, the Indian Act, the Numbered Treaties and Aboriginal case law.

== Public hearings ==
The commission consisted of several high-profile Aboriginal members and jurists, including Paul Chartrand (Commissioner of the Aboriginal Justice Implementation Commission), J. Peter Meekison, Viola Robinson, Mary Sillett, and Bertha Wilson, and was chaired by René Dussault, and Georges Erasmus.

Using its $60-million dollar budget, the five commissioners visited 96 First Nation communities and held 178 days of public hearings.

== Final report ==
The Commission issued its final report in November 1996. The five-volume, 4,000-page report covered a vast range of issues; its 440 recommendations called for sweeping changes to the relationship between Aboriginal, non-Aboriginal people and the governments in Canada. Some of the major recommendations included the following:

- Legislation, including a new Royal Proclamation stating Canada's commitment to a new relationship and companion legislation setting out a treaty process and recognition of Aboriginal nations and governments.
- Recognition of an Aboriginal order of government, subject to the Charter of Rights and Freedoms, with authority over matters related to the good government and welfare of Aboriginal peoples and their territories.
- Replacement of the federal Department of Indian Affairs with two departments, one to implement the new relationship with Aboriginal nations and one to provide services for non-self-governing communities.
- Creation of an Aboriginal parliament.
- Expansion of the Aboriginal land and resource base.
- Recognition of Métis self-government, provision of a land base, and recognition of Métis rights to hunt and fish on Crown land.
- Initiatives to address social, education, health (Indian Health Transfer Policy) and housing needs, including the training of 10,000 health professionals over a ten-year period, the establishment of an Aboriginal peoples' university, and recognition of Aboriginal nations' authority over child welfare.

The report outlined a 20-year timeline for the implementation of identified recommendations. In 2016, during an interview regarding the conclusion of the 20-year period, Paul Chartrand, one of the report commissioners, acknowledged not much had changed.

== Response ==
Georges Erasmus denounced the historical role of the Roman Catholic Church in Canada in the forced assimilation of Aboriginal Peoples, citing the abandonment of indigenous languages, cultures and traditions.

== Legacy ==
Despite the majority of the RCAP recommendations remaining unimplemented, the summary of the final report of the Truth and Reconciliation Commission of Canada credits the report of the Royal Commission on Aboriginal Peoples with drawing the attention of non-Indigenous Canadians to the lived experiences of Indigenous peoples in Canada and redirecting the nature of related conversations. The RCAP report also led to greater recognition in Western Canada of "the urgent need for preservation of Canada's Indigenous languages, many of which face extinction if current trends continue". In response to the threat of extinction, institutes for the revitalization of indigenous languages, including the Canadian Indigenous Languages and Literacy Development Institute (CILLDI), were established. Now based at the University of Alberta, CILLDI had attracted over 1,000 participants to its summer school programmes by 2016.

== See also ==
- The Canadian Crown and Aboriginal peoples
- Indian Register
- Congress of Aboriginal Peoples
- Aboriginal Justice Implementation Commission
- Human rights in Canada
- Blanket exercise
