= Nunn Commission =

Canadian public inquiry

The Nunn Commission of Inquiry (Nunn Commission-December 2006) was a landmark public inquiry into Canada's youth criminal justice system. It was chaired by the Hon. D. Merlin Nunn, a retired Justice of the Supreme Court of Nova Scotia. The Nunn Commission examined the events of October 14, 2004, in which Theresa McEvoy, of Halifax, Nova Scotia, a 52-year-old teacher's aide and mother of three boys, was killed when the car she was travelling in was broadsided by another vehicle. The other car had been stolen and was being driven at high speeds by a serial young offender who had been mistakenly released from jail just two days previously.

== Background ==
On October 14, 2004 Archibald (Archie) Billard, then 16, stole a car in Lower Sackville Nova Scotia. After consuming large amounts of cannabis, Billard drove the car at a high rate of speed through downtown Halifax where he struck McEvoy.

The death of McEvoy happened at a time of increased concern about youth crime in Nova Scotia. In the investigation following McEvoy's death it was determined that Billard, though only 16, was already facing multiple charges at the time he stole the car, and had been released from custody only two days earlier. A public outcry about McEvoy's death and a perceived problem with growing youth crime lead to the formation of the Nunn Commission, a landmark public inquiry into Canada's youth criminal justice system.

== The Commission ==
The Commission convened on June 29, 2005. The Commissioner was charged with:

- determining what happened
- what the youth criminal justice policies and procedures were at the time and whether they were adequate
- determining what actions of law enforcement and Justice officials took in relation to this incident
- determining the reasons why the offender was released, and
- judging the adequacy of legislation governing youth criminal justice in Canada

Over 31 days of testimony, Commissioner Nunn heard from 47 witnesses, including the families of the principals, policing agencies, Government and court officials, educational officials, and the legal establishment. Chief commission counsel was Michael J. Messenger of Cox & Palmer. Nine parties were represented. The Commissioner tabled his final report on December 5, 2006. The report tabled 34 recommendations in the areas of youth justice administration and accountability, youth crime legislation, and prevention of youth crime. The Commissioner's findings focused much attention on the deficiencies of the Youth Criminal Justice Act, which was cited as an important factor that led to the tragedy, along with improvements in responding to "at-risk" children and youth in Nova Scotia.

The Government of Nova Scotia accepted all of the Commissioner's recommendations and published an official response.

== After the Commission ==
The Nunn Commission's findings have been cited as a significant factor in proposed changes to the Youth Criminal Justice Act. However, Commissioner Nunn has made public comments disagreeing with some aspects of the proposed legislation.

Billard's case continues to be a focus of discussion in Nova Scotian politics in relation to issues of youth justice, restorative justice, and education.

In 2006 Billard was tried as an adult and sentenced to four years and ten months in prison.

In June 2009 Billard was entitled to a statutory release, despite misgivings from the parole board that he was likely to re-offend. Four months later he was arrested for speeding in an unregistered vehicle and returned to prison. In February 2010 he was again released, though his case management team described his risk as "unmanageable" and recommend against it. He broke his conditions and returned to prison. In 2011 he was sentenced to nine months in prison for driving while prohibited and violating his conditions. In 2015 he was charged with robbing a gas station in Truro, Nova Scotia.
