= Royal Commission on Railways =

Canadian inquiry

Royal Commission to Inquire Into the Advisability of Constituting a Court of Railway Commissioners
- Outcome: Report of the Royal Commission on Railways
- Commissioners: Alexander Tilloch Galt (Chair); Collingwood Schreiber; George Moberley; Egerton Ryerson Burpee; Thomas Edward Kenny
- Inquiry period: 14 August 1886 – 1888

The Royal Commission on Railways was a royal commission established in 1886 to address issues affecting rail commerce in Canada. The Commission was chaired by Alexander Galt and released its final report in 1887.

It was initiated by Prime Minister John A. Macdonald to resolve disputes between shippers who felt the large railway companies were charging unfair rates and the railways who wanted to avoid regulations that could reduce their profits. A bill to create a railway commission to control rates had failed in Parliament and the commission was launched to find a solution to the problem.

The findings of the Royal Commission became the basis of the Railways Act of 1888. The act outlawed some of the pricing practices that most offended shippers but did not create a board to control prices.
