= Canadian Institute for Advanced Research =

Canadian mutidisciplinary research organization

Coordinates: 43.6595629°N 79.3919866°W

CIFAR
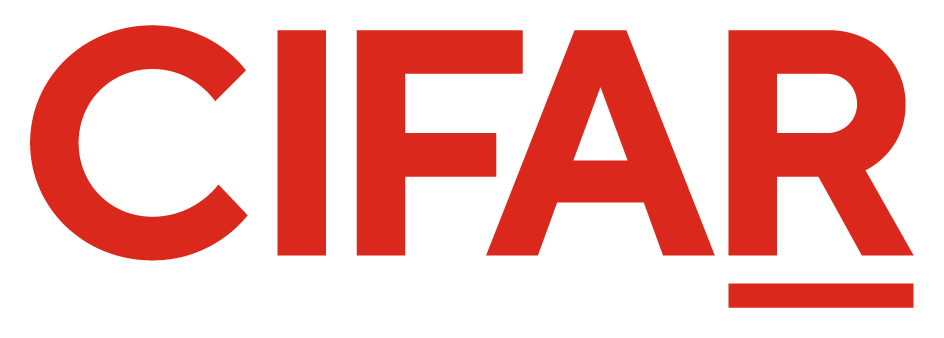
- Established: 1982
- President: Stephen Toope
- Staff: 55 (2023)
- Members: 400+ researchers and advisors
- Address: MaRS Centre, West Tower, 661 University Avenue, Suite 505
- Location: Toronto, Canada
- Website: www.cifar.ca

The Canadian Institute for Advanced Research (CIFAR) is a Canadian-based global research organization. It was founded in 1982 and is supported by individuals, foundations and corporations, as well as funding from the Government of Canada and the provinces of Alberta and Quebec.

== Operations ==
CIFAR staff supports more than 400 researchers from 21 countries and more than 140 institutions. Approximately half of the researchers are based in Canada and half are located abroad. The President and CEO is directly responsible to the Chair and the Board of Directors, who are responsible for funding allocation and approval of research programs. In November 2022, Stephen Toope became president and CEO. Irfhan Rawji is the chair of CIFAR's Board of Directors. Jacqueline Koerner and Anne McLellan serve as co-vice chairs. CIFAR receives funding from a blend of governments, partnerships (research organizations and universities), private sector (corporations, foundations and individuals) and investment income. CIFAR's annual budget in 2018 was $30M. In 2017, CIFAR was asked by the Government of Canada to develop and lead the Pan-Canadian Artificial Intelligence Strategy.

== Research programs ==
As of 2023, CIFAR supports research in 15 major multidisciplinary areas:

- Bio-inspired Solar Energy (established 2014)
- Boundaries, Membership & Belonging (established 2019)
- Brain, Mind & Consciousness (established 2014)
- Child & Brain Development (formerly known as Experience-based Brain and Biological Development, established 2003)
- Earth 4D: Subsurface Science & Exploration (established 2019)
- Fungal Kingdom: Threats & Opportunities (established 2019)
- Future Flourishing (established 2023)
- Gravity & the Extreme Universe (established 1986)
- Humanity's Urban Future (established 2023)
- Humans & the Microbiome (established 2014)
- Innovation, Equity & the Future of Prosperity (established 2019)
- Learning in Machines & Brains (formerly known as Neural Computation & Adaptive Perception, established 2004)
- The Multiscale Human (established 2023)
- Quantum Information Science (established 2002)
- Quantum Materials (established 1987)

Past programs:

- Artificial Intelligence and Robotics (formerly known as Artificial Intelligence, Robotics and Society, established 1983, closed 1995)
- Population Health (established 1983, closed 2003)
- Evolutionary Biology (established 1986, closed 2007)
- Laws and the Determinants of Social Order (established 1986, closed 1996)
- Economic Growth and Policy (established 1991, closed 2002)
- Earth System Evolution (established 1992, closed 2014)
- Human Development (established 1993, closed 2003)
- Science of Soft Surfaces and Interfaces (established 1993, closed 2000)
- Nanoelectronics (established 1999, closed 2013)
- Genetic Networks (established 2002, closed 2020)
- Successful Societies (established 2002, closed 2019)
- Institutions, Organizations & Growth (established 2004, closed 2020)
- Social Interactions, Identity & Well-Being (established 2005, closed 2017)
- Integrated Microbial Biodiversity (established 2007, closed 2017)
- Molecular Architecture of Life (established 2014, closing 2020)

== History ==
=== 20th century ===
CIFAR was founded in 1982. The original idea for an institute for advanced studies came from John Leyerle, a professor of English and dean of the School of Graduate Studies at the University of Toronto who began rallying support for the concept in 1978. The centre would serve to "foster basic, conceptual research of high quality at an advanced level across the full spectrum of knowledge in the humanities, social sciences, natural sciences and life sciences." Fraser Mustard, a medical doctor and researcher in early childhood development, was appointed as founding president of CIFAR in January 1982. The first 25 years of its history is covered in the book A Generation of Excellence by Craig Brown.

CIFAR fellows published several papers in 1994, including "Why are some people healthy and others not", that argued policies driven by population health could address health disparities. They named 10 determinants of health, listing socio-economic status as the most influential. The government adopted the term population health and renamed a branch of the Public Health Agency of Canada "Population and Public Health."

=== 21st century ===
In 2004, Geoffrey Hinton began leading CIFAR's Neural Computation & Adaptive Perception program. Its members included Yoshua Bengio and Yann LeCun, among other neuroscientists, computer scientists, biologists, electrical engineers, physicists, and psychologists. Together, they confirmed Hinton's conviction about the power of neural networks when they created computing systems that mimicked human intelligence. Today, the three are widely acknowledged as the pioneers of deep learning. In 2019, the Association for Computing Machinery (ACM) named Hinton, Bengio and LeCun as recipients of the 2018 ACM A.M. Turing Award for conceptual and engineering breakthroughs that have made deep neural networks a critical component of computing.

In April 2012, the United Nations Sustainable Development Solutions Network published the first World Happiness Report co-authored by CIFAR Senior Fellow John F. Helliwell at the University of British Columbia; Lord Richard Layard, Director of the Well-Being Programme at LSE's Centre for Economic Performance; and Professor Jeffrey Sachs, Director of The Earth Institute at Columbia University, Director of the SDSN, and Special Advisor to the UN Secretary General.

In 2017, Innovation, Science and Economic Development Canada (ISED) renewed and enhanced its funding for CIFAR, investing $35 million over five years. The government also announced that CIFAR will administer a $125 million Pan-Canadian Artificial Intelligence Strategy for research and talent. In 2022, CIFAR announced the second phase of the Pan-Canadian Artificial Intelligence Strategy, which includes up to $208 million in federal support to CIFAR over ten years.

== Notable people ==
CIFAR has been led by a series of notable Presidents: Fraser Mustard from 1982 to 1996, J. Stefan Dupré from 1996 to 2000, Chaviva Hošek from 2001 to 2012, and Alan Bernstein from 2012 to 2022. The current President, as of 2023, is Stephen Toope.

Since the institute's inception, 23 Nobel laureates have been associated with CIFAR.

- Daron Acemoglu
- George A. Akerlof
- Sidney Altman
- Philip W. Anderson
- Kenneth Arrow
- Willard Boyle
- Walter Gilbert
- Leland H. Hartwell
- Geoffrey Hinton
- Daniel Kahneman
- Brian Kobilka
- Robert B. Laughlin
- Anthony J. Leggett
- Art McDonald
- Roger B. Myerson
- James Peebles
- John C. Polanyi
- Richard J. Roberts
- James A. Robinson
- Paul Romer
- Michael Smith
- Eric Wieschaus
- David Wineland

== See also ==
- Canadian government scientific research organizations
- Canadian university scientific research organizations
- Canadian industrial research and development organizations
