= Reasons of the Supreme Court of Canada by Justice Moldaver =

The Honourable Michael J. Moldaver

Puisne Justice of the Supreme Court of Canada
- Incumbent
- Assumed office October 21, 2011
- Nominated by: Stephen Harper

Personal details
- Born: December 23, 1947 (age 78) Peterborough, Ontario
- Education: University of Toronto; University of Toronto Faculty of Law
- Occupation: Jurist
- Profession: Lawyer

This article is a list of Justice Michael Moldaver's written judgments during his tenure as puisne justice of the Supreme Court of Canada.

== 2012 ==
Statistics

11	Majority or Plurality	0	Concurrence	0	Other
0	Dissent	0	Concurrence/dissent	Total =	11
Written opinions = 11		Oral opinions = 0		Unanimous decisions = 6

Case name	Issue	Co-authored by	Joined by
R v Tse; 2012 SCC 16	Whether s. 184.4 of the Criminal Code infringes the right to be free from unreasonable search and seizure under s. 8 of the Charter	Karakatsanis J	Unanimous
R v Jesse; 2012 SCC 21	Admissibility of similar fact evidence	–	Unanimous
Entertainment Software Association v Society of Composers, Authors and Music Publishers of Canada; 2012 SCC 34	Intellectual property and whether the transmission of musical works contained in a video game through an Internet download is a communication "to the public" under the federal Copyright Act	Abella J	McLachlin CJ and Deschamps and Karakatsanis JJ
R v Vu; 2012 SCC 40	Offence of kidnapping and whether kidnapping is a continuing offence encompassing subsequent confinement of victim, and whether persons who knowingly choose to participate in subsequent confinement becomes parties to the offence of kidnapping	–	Unanimous
R v Walle; 2012 SCC 41	Offence of murder and whether trial judge erred in resorting to common sense inference that a person who usually knows predictable consequences of actions and means to bring them about without first considering the whole of the evidence bearing on the accused's mental state at time of shooting	–	Unanimous
R v Prokofiew; 2012 SCC 49	Co-accused's counsel inviting jury to infer accused's guilt from a failure to testify, and whether the trial judge's failure to give explicit remedial instruction in charge to jury constituted a legal error under s. 4(6) of the Canada Evidence Act	–	Deschamps, Abella, Rothstein and Karakatsanis JJ
Opitz v Wrzesnewskyj; 2012 SCC 55	Application to have federal election result annulled on the basis of "irregularities... that affected the result of the election" under s. 531(2) of the Canada Elections Act	Rothstein J	Deschamps and Abella JJ
R v Nedelcu; 2012 SCC 59	Whether Crown at criminal trial may cross examine an accused on prior inconsistent statements without infringing the right against self-incrimination under s. 13 of the Charter	–	McLachlin CJ and Deschamps, Abella, Rothstein and Karakatsanis JJ
R v Aucoin; 2012 SCC 66	Whether pat-down search was unreasonable under s. 8 of the Charter; Whether detention of the accused was unlawful under s. 9 of the Charter; Whether evidence ought to be excluded pursuant to s. 24(2) of the Charter	–	Deschamps, Abella, Rothstein and Karakatsanis JJ
R v Yumnu; 2012 SCC 73	Whether it was appropriate for the Crown to seek police criminal record checks of prospective jurors and also to provide comments on whether any prospective jurors were "disreputable persons"; Where same should have been disclosed to the accused; Whether there is a reasonable possibility that same affected trial fairness or gave rise to an appearance of unfairness, such that a miscarriage of justice occurred	–	Unanimous
R v Emms; 2012 SCC 74	Whether it was appropriate for the Crown to seek police criminal record checks of prospective jurors and also to provide comments on whether any prospective jurors were "disreputable persons"; Where same should have been disclosed to the accused; Whether there is a reasonable possibility that same affected trial fairness or gave rise to an appearance of unfairness, such that a miscarriage of justice occurred	–	Unanimous

== 2013 ==
Statistics

5	Majority or Plurality	3	Concurrence	0	Other
1	Dissent	0	Concurrence/dissent	Total =	9
Written opinions = 9		Oral opinions = 0		Unanimous decisions = 2

Case name	Issue	Co-authored by	Joined by
R v JF; 2013 SCC 12	Whether a person can be a party to the offence of conspiracy	–	Unanimous
R v TELUS Communications Co; 2013 SCC 16	Whether the general warrant power under s. 487.01 of the Criminal Code can authorize prospective production of future text messages from telecommunications service provider's database	–	Karakatsanis J
Ediger v Johnston; 2013 SCC 18	Tort of negligence	Rothstein J	Unanimous
R v ADH; 2013 SCC 28	Whether the mens rea for the offence of child abandonment under s. 218 of the Criminal Code is subjective or objective	–	Rothstein J
Communications, Energy and Paperworkers Union of Canada, Local 30 v Irving Pulp & Paper, Ltd; 2013 SCC 34	Labour arbitration and collective agreement management rights clauses	Rothstein J	McLachlin CJ
R v Baldree; 2013 SCC 35	Admissibility of hearsay evidence	–	–
R v MacKenzie; 2013 SCC 50	Unreasonable search and seizure and exclusion of evidence under ss. 8 and 24(2) of the Charter	–	Abella, Rothstein, Karakatsanis and Wagner JJ
McLean v British Columbia (Securities Commission); 2013 SCC 67	Judicial review and standard of review of securities commission decision	–	LeBel, Fish, Rothstein, Cromwell and Wagner JJ
Wood v Schaeffer; 2013 SCC 71	Whether police officers have right to consult with counsel before making notes on an incident; Whether police officers are entitled to basic legal advice as to the nature of rights and obligations in connection with an incident	–	McLachlin CJ and Abella, Rothstein, Karakatsanis and Wagner JJ

== 2014 ==
2014 statistics

9	Majority or Plurality	2	Concurrence	0	Other
1	Dissent	0	Concurrence/dissent	Total =	12
Written opinions = 9		Oral opinions = 3		Unanimous decisions = 5

Case name	Issue	Co-authored by	Joined by
R v WEB; 2014 SCC 2	Ineffective assistance of counsel	–	Unanimous (oral)
R v MacDonald; 2014 SCC 3	Unreasonable search and seizure	Wagner J	Rothstein J
R v James; 2014 SCC 5	Offence of sexual assault; Evidence	–	Unanimous (oral)
R v Flaviano; 2014 SCC 14	Offence of sexual assault and defence of mistaken belief in consent	–	Unanimous (oral)
R v Sekhon; 2014 SCC 15	Admissibility of expert evidence	–	Abella, Rothstein, Karakatsanis and Wagner JJ
R v Babos; 2014 SCC 16	Stay of proceedings and abuse of process	–	McLachlin CJ and LeBel, Cromwell, Karakatsanis and Wagner JJ
R v Hutchinson; 2014 SCC 19	Offence of sexual assault and consent	Abella J	Karakatsanis J
Reference Re Supreme Court Act, ss 5 and 6; 2014 SCC 21	Eligibility requirements to the Supreme Court of Canada	–	–
R v Anderson; 2014 SCC 41	Whether s. 7 of the Charter requires the Crown to consider aboriginal status in seeking mandatory minimum sentences	–	Unanimous
R v Hart; 2014 SCC 52	Admissibility of "Mr. Big" confessions	–	McLachlin CJ and LeBel, Abella and Wagner JJ
R v Mack; 2014 SCC 58	Admissibility of "Mr. Big" confessions	–	Unanimous
Wakeling v United States of America; 2014 SCC 72	Unreasonable search and seizure under s. 8 of the Charter and the disclosure of intercepted private communications without consent	–	LeBel and Rothstein JJ

== 2015 ==
Statistics

6	Majority or Plurality	3	Concurrence	2	Other
2	Dissent	2	Concurrence/dissent	Total =	6
Written opinions = 3		Oral opinions = 3		Unanimous decisions = 3

Case name	Issue	Co-authored by	Joined by
Canada (AG) v Federation of Law Societies of Canada; 2015 SCC 7	Whether Proceeds of Crime (Money Laundering) and Terrorist Financing Act, as it applies to the legal profession, infringes the right to be free from unreasonable search and seizure and the right not to be deprived of liberty otherwise in accordance with principles of fundamental justice under ss. 8 and 7 of the Charter, respectively	McLachlin CJ	–
Loyola High School v Quebec (AG); 2015 SCC 12	Proper approach to judicial review of discretionary administrative decisions engaging Charter protections; Whether decision of Minister of Education, Recreation and Sports requiring a proposed alternative program being entirely secular in approach is reasonable given the statutory objectives of the program and s. 2(a) of the Charter, and whether the decision limits freedom of religion under s. 3 of the Quebec Charter of Human Rights and Freedoms	McLachlin CJ	Rothstein J
R v Nur; 2015 SCC 15	Constitutionality of mandatory minimum sentences on grounds of cruel and unusual punishment under s. 12 of the Charter	–	Rothstein and Wagner JJ
Henry v British Columbia (AG); 2015 SCC 24	Wrongful conviction of claimant; Civil action alleging breach of Charter rights resulting from Crown counsel's wrongful non-disclose of relevant information; Whether s. 24(1) authorizes courts to award damages against Crown for wrongful non-disclosure, and the level of fault claimant must establish to meet liability threshold for awarding s. 24(1) damages	–	Abella, Wagner and Gascon JJ
R v Kokopenace; 2015 SCC 28	Appropriate legal test for representativeness on jury roll; Jury representativeness under ss. 11(d) and (f) and 15 of the Charter	–	Rothstein, Wagner and Gascon JJ
R v Tatton; 2015 SCC 33	Whether arson is a general or specific intent offence; Accused relying on self-induced intoxication as a defence for committing arson	–	Unanimous
R v Rodgerson; 2015 SCC 38	Whether trial judge erred in instructions to jury on concealment and clean-up of body in a murder charge and same's bearing on issue of intent for murder, and if so, whether that error was fatal in conjunction with erroneous instructions on accused's flight from and lies to police; Impact of long and complex jury charges on criminal justice system	–	Unanimous
R v Simpson; 2015 SCC 40	Defence of colour of right	–	Unanimous
Wilson v British Columbia (Superintendent of Motor Vehicles); 2015 SCC 47	Whether a peace officer is entitled to rely on results of an approved screening device used to collect breath samples to impose a driving prohibition, or whether other confirmatory evidence is required; Whether Superintendent of Motor Vehicles's interpretation of a statutory provision imposing immediate driving prohibition under the provincial Motor Vehicles Act was reasonable	–	Unanimous
Kanthasamy v Canada (Citizenship and Immigration); 2015 SCC 61	Whether decision of Minister of Citizenship and Immigration to deny relief to claimant seeking humanitarian and compassionate exemption to apply for permanent residence from within Canada was a reasonable exercise of humanitarian and compassionate discretion under the Immigration and Refugee Protection Act	–	Wagner J

- Canada (AG) v Federation of Law Societies of Canada, 2015 SCC 7 (Dissent - Concurrence)
- Loyola High School v Quebec (AG), 2015 SCC 12 (Dissent - Concurrence)
- R v Nur, 2015 SCC 15 (Dissent)
- Henry v British Columbia (AG), 2015 SCC 24 (Majority)
- R v Kokopenace, 2015 SCC 28 (Majority)
- R v Tatton, 2015 SCC 33 (Unanimous)
- R v Rodgerson, 2015 SCC 38 (Unanimous)
- R v Simpson, 2015 SCC 40 (Unanimous)
- Wilson v British Columbia (Superintendent of Motor Vehicles), 2015 SCC 47 (Unanimous)
- Kanthasamy v Canada (Citizen and Immigration), 2015 SCC 61 (Dissent)

== 2016 ==
- R v Seruhungo, 2016 SCC 2 (Dissent)
- R v Spicer, 2016 SCC 3 (Unanimous)
- Carter v Canada (AG), 2016 SCC 4 (Dissent - Concurrence)
- World Bank Group v Wallace, 2016 SCC 15 (Unanimous)
- R v Saeed, 2016 SCC 24 (Majority)
- R v Vassell, 2016 SCC 26 (Unanimous)
- R v Jordan, 2016 SCC 27 (Majority)
- R v Williamson, 2016 SCC 28 (Majority)
- R v Anthony-Cook, 2016 SCC 43 (Majority)
- Morasse v Nadeau-Dubois, 2016 SCC 44 (Concurrence)
- Windsor (City of) v Canadian Transit Co, 2016 SCC 54 (Dissent)

== 2017 ==
Michael Moldaver 2017 statistics

7	Majority or Plurality	1	Concurrence	0	Other
6	Dissent	0	Concurrence/dissent	Total =	14
Written opinions = 12		Oral opinions = 2		Unanimous decisions = 5

Criminal law = 9

Case name	Issue	Co-authored by	Joined by
Ernst v Alberta Energy Regulator; 2017 SCC 1	Freedom of expression and Charter damages	McLachlin CJ and Brown J	Côté J
R v Awer; 2017 SCC 3	Sexual assault	–	Unanimous (oral)
R v Paterson; 2017 SCC 15	Constitutional law – search and seizure	–	Gascon J
R v Oland; 2017 SCC 17	Criminal law – Applications for release pending appeal	–	Unanimous
Stewart v Elk Valley Coal Corp; 2017 SCC 30	Discrimination based on mental and physical disability	Wagner J	–
Teal Cedar Products Ltd v British Columbia; 2017 SCC 32	Standard of review of commercial arbitration awards	Côté J	Brown and Rowe JJ
R v Bradshaw; 2017 SCC 35	Admissibility of hearsay evidence	–	Côté J
R v Alex; 2017 SCC 37	Admissibility of breath sample evidence	–	Karakatsanis, Wagner, Gascon and Côté JJ
India v Badesha; 2017 SCC 44	Judicial review of extradition orders; standard of review	–	Unanimous
R v Durham Region Crime Stoppers Inc; 2017 SCC 45	Evidentiary privilege of anonymous informers	–	Unanimous
R v Bourgeois; 2017 SCC 49	Sexual assault	–	Unanimous (oral)
Ktunaxa Nation v British Columbia (Forests, Lands and Natural Resource Operations); 2017 SCC 54	Freedom of religion	–	Côté J
R v Sciascia; 2017 SCC 57	Jurisdiction of provincial court trial judge	–	Abella, Karakatsanis, Wagner, Gascon and Rowe JJ
R v Marakah; 2017 SCC 59	Constitutional law – Admissibility of evidence derived from unreasonable search and seizure	–	Côté J

== 2013 ==
- R. v. TELUS Communications Co., 2013 SCC 16
- R. v. A.D.H., 2013 SCC 28
- R. v. Baldree, 2013 SCC 35
- R. v. MacKenzie, 2013 SCC 50
- McLean v. British Columbia (Securities Commission), 2013 SCC 67
- Wood v. Schaeffer, 2013 SCC 71

== 2014 ==
- R. v. Sekhon, 2014 SCC 15
- R. v. Babos, 2014 SCC 16
- Reference re Supreme Court Act, ss. 5 and 6, 2014 SCC 21
- R. v. Anderson, 2014 SCC 41
- R. v. Hart, 2014 SCC 52
- R. v. Mack, 2014 SCC 58
- Wakeling v. United States of America, 2014 SCC 72

== 2015 ==
- R. v. Nur, 2015 SCC 15
- Henry v. British Columbia (Attorney General), 2015 SCC 24
- R. v. Kokopenace, 2015 SCC 28
- R. v. Tatton, 2015 SCC 33
- R. v. Rodgerson, 2015 SCC 38
- Kanthasamy v. Canada (Citizenship and Immigration), 2015 SCC 61

== 2019 ==
- R. v. Bird, 2019 SCC 7
- R. v. Morrison, 2019 SCC 15
- TELUS Communications Inc. v. Wellman, 2019 SCC 19
- R. v. Barton, 2019 SCC 33
- R. v. Le, 2019 SCC 34
- R. v. Goldfinch, 2019 SCC 38
- R. v. Rafilovich, 2019 SCC 51
- R. v. K.J.M., 2019 SCC 55

== 2020 ==
- R. v. K.G.K., 2020 SCC 7, [2020] 1 SCR 364
- R. v. Ahmad, 2020 SCC 11, [2020] 1 SCR 577
- Reference re Genetic Non‑Discrimination Act, 2020 SCC 17, [2020] 2 SCR 283

== 2021 ==
- R. v. R.V., 2021 SCC 10
- R. v. Desautel, 2021 SCC 17
- Canada v. Canada North Group Inc., 2021 SCC 30
- Grant Thornton LLP v. New Brunswick, 2021 SCC 31
- R. v. Khill, 2021 SCC 37
- R. v. Parranto, 2021 SCC 46
- R. v. Cowan, 2021 SCC 45

== 2022 ==
- R. v. Ali, 2022 SCC 1
- R. v. A.E., 2022 SCC 4
- R. v. Samaniego, 2022 SCC 9
- R. v. Gerrard, 2022 SCC 13
- R. v. Dussault, 2022 SCC 16
- R. v. Badger, 2022 SCC 20
- R. v. J.J., 2022 SCC 28
- R. v. Nahanee, 2022 SCC 37

== See also ==
- 2012 Decisions: CanLII 2012 Reasons of the Supreme Court of Canada
- 2013 Decisions: CanLII 2013 Reasons of the Supreme Court of Canada
- 2014 Decisions: CanLII 2014 Reasons of the Supreme Court of Canada
- 2015 Decisions: CanLII 2015 Reasons of the Supreme Court of Canada
- 2016 Decisions: CanLII 2016 Reasons of the Supreme Court of Canada
- 2017 Decisions: CanLII 2017 Reasons of the Supreme Court of Canada
