= 2017 reasons of the Supreme Court of Canada =

The table below lists the decisions (known as reasons) delivered from the bench by the Supreme Court of Canada during 2017. The table illustrates what reasons were filed by each justice in each case, and which justices joined each reason.

== Reasons ==
Delivered the Court's reason
Joined the Court's reason
Filed a concurrence
Joined a concurrence
Filed a dissent
Joined a dissent
Filed a concurrence/dissent
Joined a concurrence/dissent
Did not participate in the judgment
Did not participate in the final disposition of the judgment
Not a member of the Court at the time of hearing or delivering
- Decisions that do not note a Justice delivering the Court's reason are per coram.
- Multiple concurrences and dissents within a case are numbered, with joining votes numbered accordingly. Justices occasionally join multiple reasons in a single case; each vote is subdivided accordingly.
- Multiple unnumbered reasons are jointly written or delivered.
- Decisions that are given orally from the bench are denoted by a "V"; per coram decisions delivered orally from the bench only note a "V" on the most senior justice on the panel.
- An asterisk ( * ) in the Court's opinion denotes that it was only a majority in part or a plurality.

Case name	Argued	Decided	McLachlin	Abella	Cromwell	Moldaver	Karakatsanis	Wagner	Gascon	Côté	Brown	Rowe	Martin
Ernst v Alberta Energy Regulator, 2017 SCC 1	January 12, 2016	January 13, 2017			*
R v Awer, 2017 SCC 2	January 17, 2017	January 17, 2017				V
R v Clark, 2017 SCC 3	January 18, 2017	January 18, 2017	V
R v Bédard, 2017 SCC 4	January 19, 2017	January 19, 2017	V
R v Natewayes, 2017 SCC 5	January 19, 2017	January 19, 2017	V
BC Freedom of Information and Privacy Association v British Columbia (AG), 2017 SCC 6	October 11, 2016	January 26, 2017
Sabean v Portage La Prairie Mutual Insurance Co, 2017 SCC 7	October 5, 2016	January 27, 2017
Nelson (City) v Mowatt, 2017 SCC 8	October 7, 2016	February 17, 2017
R v Clifford, 2017 SCC 9	February 17, 2017	February 17, 2017		V
R v Brown, 2017 SCC 10	February 20, 2017	February 20, 2017		V
Case name	Argued	Decided	McLachlin	Abella	Cromwell	Moldaver	Karakatsanis	Wagner	Gascon	Côté	Brown	Rowe	Martin
R v Olutu, 2017 SCC 11	February 21, 2017	February 21, 2017					V
R v Bingley, 2017 SCC 12	October 13, 2016	February 23, 2017
R v Peers, 2017 SCC 13	February 14, 2017	February 24, 2017
R v Aitkens, 2017 SCC 14	February 14, 2017	February 24, 2017
R v Paterson, 2017 SCC 15	November 2, 2016	March 17, 2017
R v SB, 2017 SCC 16	March 21, 2017	March 21, 2017	V
R v Oland, 2017 SCC 17	October 31, 2016	March 23, 2017
Godbout v Pagé, 2017 SCC 18	October 6, 2016	March 24, 2017
Desjardins Financial Security Life Assurance Co v Émond, 2017 SCC 19	March 29, 2017	March 29, 2017						V
Green v Law Society of Manitoba, 2017 SCC 20	November 9, 2016	March 30, 2017
Case name	Argued	Decided	McLachlin	Abella	Cromwell	Moldaver	Karakatsanis	Wagner	Gascon	Côté	Brown	Rowe	Martin
R v Savard, 2017 SCC 21	March 31, 2017	March 31, 2017						V
Ostiguy v Allie, 2017 SCC 22	October 7, 2016	April 6, 2017
Pintea v Johns, 2017 SCC 23	April 18, 2017	April 18, 2017					V
Lajeunesse (Re), 2017 SCC 24	April 20, 2017	April 20, 2017							V
R v Hunt, 2017 SCC 25	April 25, 2017	April 25, 2017		V
R v George, 2017 SCC 38	April 28, 2017	April 28, 2017
Quebec (Criminal and Penal Prosecutions) v Jodoin, 2017 SCC 26	December 5, 2016	May 12, 2017
R v Antic, 2017 SCC 27	December 2, 2016	June 1, 2017
Saadati v Moorhead, 2017 SCC 28	January 16, 2017	June 2, 2017
Pellerin Savitz LLP v Guindon , 2017 SCC 29	February 22, 2017	June 9, 2017
Case name	Argued	Decided	McLachlin	Abella	Cromwell	Moldaver	Karakatsanis	Wagner	Gascon	Côté	Brown	Rowe	Martin
Stewart v Elk Valley Coal Corp, 2017 SCC 30	December 9, 2016	June 15, 2017
R v Cody, 2017 SCC 31	April 15, 2017	June 16, 2017
Teal Cedar Products Ltd v British Columbia, 2017 SCC 32	November 1, 2016	June 22, 2017
Douez v Facebook, Inc, 2017 SCC 33	November 4, 2016	June 23, 2017					*	*	*
Google Inc v Equustek Solutions Inc, 2017 SCC 34	December 6, 2016	June 28, 2017
R v Bradshaw, 2017 SCC 35	November 3, 2016	June 29, 2017
AstraZeneca Canada Inc v Apotex Inc, 2017 SCC 36	November 8, 2016	June 30, 2017
R v Alex, 2017 SCC 37	December 8, 2016	July 6, 2017
Wilson v Alharayeri, 2017 SCC 39	November 29, 2016	July 13, 2017
Clyde River (Hamlet) v Petroleum Geo-Services Inc, 2017 SCC 40	November 30, 2016	July 26, 2017
Case name	Argued	Decided	McLachlin	Abella	Cromwell	Moldaver	Karakatsanis	Wagner	Gascon	Côté	Brown	Rowe	Martin
Chippewas of the Thames First Nation v Enbridge Pipelines Inc, 2017 SCC 41	November 30, 2016	July 26, 2017
Québec (AG) v Guérin, 2017 SCC 42	January 11, 2017	July 27, 2017
Uniprix inc v Gestion Gosselin et Bérubé inc, 2017 SCC 43	January 12, 2017	July 28, 2017
India v Badesha, 2017 SCC 44	March 20, 2017	September 8, 2017
R v Durham Regional Crime Stoppers Inc, 2017 SCC 45	January 30, 2017	September 22, 2017
Canada (AG) v Thouin, 2017 SCC 46	May 24, 2017	September 28, 2017
Canada (AG) v Fontaine, 2017 SCC 47	May 25, 2017	October 6, 2017
Montréal (City) v Dorval, 2017 SCC 48	February 23, 2017	October 13, 2017
R v Bourgeois, 2017 SCC 49	October 13, 2017	October 13, 2017				V
Tran v Canada (Public Safety and Emergency Preparedness), 2017 SCC 50	January 13, 2017	October 19, 2017
Case name	Argued	Decided	McLachlin	Abella	Cromwell	Moldaver	Karakatsanis	Wagner	Gascon	Côté	Brown	Rowe	Martin
Teva Canada Ltd v TD Canada Trust, 2017 SCC 51	February 24, 2017	October 27, 2017
R v Robinson, 2017 SCC 52	October 30, 2017	October 30, 2017		V
R v Millington, 2017 SCC 53	October 30, 2017	October 30, 2017		V
Ktunaxa Nation v British Columbia (Forests, Lands and Natural Resource Operations), 2017 SCC 54	December 1, 2016	November 2, 2017
Association of Justice Counsel v Canada (Attorney General), 2017 SCC 55	April 19, 2017	November 3, 2017
Barreau du Québec v Québec (Attorney General), 2017 SCC 56	March 27, 2017	November 10, 2017
R v Sciascia, 2017 SCC 57	April 24, 2017	November 23, 2017
R v Magoon, 2018 SCC 14	November 27, 2017	November 27, 2017
R v Jordan, 2018 SCC 14	November 27, 2017	November 27, 2017
First Nation of Nacho Nyak Dun v Yukon, 2017 SCC 58	March 22, 2017	December 1, 2017
Case name	Argued	Decided	McLachlin	Abella	Cromwell	Moldaver	Karakatsanis	Wagner	Gascon	Côté	Brown	Rowe	Martin
R v Marakah, 2017 SCC 59	March 23, 2017	December 8, 2017
R v Jones, 2017 SCC 60	March 23, 2017	December 8, 2017
Cowper-Smith v Morgan, 2017 SCC 61	May 26, 2017	December 14, 2017								1	2
British Columbia Human Rights Tribunal v Schrenk, 2017 SCC 62	March 28, 2017	December 15, 2017
Case name	Argued	Decided	McLachlin	Abella	Cromwell	Moldaver	Karakatsanis	Wagner	Gascon	Côté	Brown	Rowe	Martin

On December 15, 2017, Chief Justice Beverley McLachlin retired. Richard Wagner was sworn in as Chief Justice on December 18, 2017.

Case name	Argued	Decided	McLachlin	Wagner	Abella	Moldaver	Karakatsanis	Gascon	Côté	Brown	Rowe	Martin
Deloitte & Touche v Livent Inc (Receiver of), 2017 SCC 63	February 15, 2017	December 20, 2017
R v Boutilier, 2017 SCC 64	May 23, 2017	December 21, 2017
