= 2013 reasons of the Supreme Court of Canada =

The table below lists the decisions (known as reasons) delivered from the bench by the Supreme Court of Canada during 2013. The table illustrates what reasons were filed by each justice in each case, and which justices joined each reason. This list, however, does not include reasons on motions.

== Reasons ==
Delivered the Court's reason
Joined the Court's reason
Filed a concurrence
Joined a concurrence
Filed a dissent
Joined a dissent
Filed a concurrence/dissent
Joined a concurrence/dissent
Did not participate in the judgment
Did not participate in the final disposition of the judgment
Not a member of the Court at the time of hearing or delivering
- Decisions that do not note a Justice delivering the Court's reason are per coram.
- Multiple concurrences and dissents within a case are numbered, with joining votes numbered accordingly. Justices occasionally join multiple reasons in a single case; each vote is subdivided accordingly.
- Multiple unnumbered reasons are jointly written or delivered.
- Decisions that are given orally from the bench are denoted by a "V"; per coram decisions delivered orally from the bench only note a "V" on the most senior justice on the panel.
- An asterisk ( * ) in the Court's opinion denotes that it was only a majority in part or a plurality.

Case name	Argued	Decided	McLachlin	LeBel	Deschamps	Fish	Abella	Rothstein	Cromwell	Moldaver	Karakatsanis	Wagner
R v Manning, 2013 SCC 1	December 5, 2012	January 17, 2013
R v O'Brien, 2013 SCC 2	December 6, 2012	January 17, 2013
R v Ryan, 2013 SCC 3	June 14, 2012	January 18, 2013
R v Sanichar, 2013 SCC 4	December 6, 2012	January 24, 2013
Quebec (AG) v A, 2013 SCC 5	January 8, 2012	January 25, 2013		*
Sun Indalex Finance, LLC v United Steelworkers, 2013 SCC 6	June 5, 2012	February 1, 2013
R v Bélanger, 2013 SCC 7	February 12, 2013	February 12, 2013										V
R v Blacklaws, 2013 SCC 8	February 15, 2013	February 15, 2013	V
R v Named Person B, 2013 SCC 9	April 11, 2012	February 22, 2013
R v Taylor, 2013 SCC 10	February 22, 2013	February 22, 2013				V
Case name	Argued	Decided	McLachlin	LeBel	Deschamps	Fish	Abella	Rothstein	Cromwell	Moldaver	Karakatsanis	Wagner
Saskatchewan Human Rights Commission v Whatcott, 2013 SCC 11	October 12, 2011	February 27, 2013
R v JF, 2013 SCC 12	October 12, 2012	March 1, 2013
Antrim Truck Centre Ltd v Ontario (Transportation), 2013 SCC 13	November 14, 2012	March 7, 2013
Manitoba Métis Federation Inc et al v Canada (AG), 2013 SCC 14	December 13, 2011	March 8, 2013
R v Pham, 2013 SCC 15	January 18, 2013	March 14, 2013
R v TELUS Communications Co, 2013 SCC 16	October 15, 2012	March 27, 2013
R v Mailhot, 2013 SCC 17	March 19, 2013	March 28, 2013
Ediger v Johnston , 2013 SCC 18	December 4, 2012	April 4, 2013
Penner v Niagara (Regional Police Services Board), 2013 SCC 19	January 11, 2012	April 5, 2013
R v Lévesque, 2013 SCC 20	April 16, 2013	April 16, 2013		V
Case name	Argued	Decided	McLachlin	LeBel	Deschamps	Fish	Abella	Rothstein	Cromwell	Moldaver	Karakatsanis	Wagner
R v Murphy, 2013 SCC 21	April 16, 2013	April 16, 2013		V
R v WH, 2013 SCC 22	January 21, 2013	April 19, 2013
R v MacIntosh, 2013 SCC 23	April 22, 2013	April 22, 2013	V
R v GM, 2013 SCC 24	April 25, 2013	April 25, 2013	V
R v Levkovic, 2013 SCC 25	October 10, 2012	May 3, 2013
Behn v Moulton Contracting Ltd, 2013 SCC 26	December 11, 2012	May 9, 2013
R v Buzizi, 2013 SCC 27	March 27, 2013	May 10, 2013
R v ADH, 2013 SCC 28	October 11, 2012	May 17, 2013
Daishowa-Marubeni International Ltd v Canada, 2013 SCC 29	February 20, 2013	May 23, 2013
Cojocaru v British Columbia Women's Hospital and Health Center, 2013 SCC 30	November 13, 2012	May 24, 2013
Case name	Argued	Decided	McLachlin	LeBel	Deschamps	Fish	Abella	Rothstein	Cromwell	Moldaver	Karakatsanis	Wagner
R v Ibanescu, 2013 SCC 31	May 15, 2013	May 30, 2013
R v Gauthier, 2013 SCC 32	December 13, 2012	June 7, 2013
Nishi v Rascal Trucking Ltd, 2013 SCC 33	January 16, 2013	June 13, 2013
Communications, Energy and Paperworkers Union of Canada, Local 30 v Irving Pulp & Paper, Ltd, 2013 SCC 34	December 7, 2012	June 14, 2013
R v Baldree, 2013 SCC 35	November 7, 2012	June 19, 2013
Agraira v Canada (Public Safety and Emergency Preparedness), 2013 SCC 36	October 18, 2012	June 20, 2013
Sable Offshore Energy Inc v Ameron International Corp, 2013 SCC 37	March 25, 2013	June 21, 2013
R v Vuradin, 2013 SCC 38	May 16, 2013	June 27, 2013
Canadian National Railway Co v McKercher LLP, 2013 SCC 39	January 24, 2013	July 5, 2013
Ezokola v Canada (Citizenship and Immigration), 2013 SCC 40	January 17, 2013	July 19, 2013
Case name	Argued	Decided	McLachlin	LeBel	Deschamps	Fish	Abella	Rothstein	Cromwell	Moldaver	Karakatsanis	Wagner
R v Youvarajah, 2013 SCC 41	February 20, 2013	July 25, 2013
Conseil Scolaire Francophone de la Colombie-Britannique v British Columbia, 2013 SCC 42	April 15, 2013	July 26, 2013
Ontario v Criminal Lawyers' Association of Ontario, 2013 SCC 43	December 12, 2012	August 1, 2013
Marine Services International Ltd v Ryan Estate, 2013 SCC 44	January 15, 2013	August 2, 2013
Payette v Guay inc, 2013 SCC 45	January 23, 2013	September 12, 2013
Régie des rentes du Québec v Canada Bread Co, 2013 SCC 46	April 17, 2013	September 13, 2013
Divito v Canada (Public Safety and Emergency Preparedness), 2013 SCC 47	February 18, 2013	September 19, 2013
Envision Credit Union v Canada, 2013 SCC 48	March 19, 2013	September 26, 2013
R v Chehil, 2013 SCC 49	January 22, 2013	September 27, 2013
R v MacKenzie, 2013 SCC 50	January 22, 2013	September 27, 2013
Case name	Argued	Decided	McLachlin	LeBel	Deschamps	Fish	Abella	Rothstein	Cromwell	Moldaver	Karakatsanis	Wagner
British Columbia (Forests) v Teal Cedar Products Ltd, 2013 SCC 51	March 21, 2013	October 4, 2013
Castonguay Blasting Ltd v Ontario (Environment), 2013 SCC 52	May 17, 2013	October 17, 2013
Cuthbertson v Rasouli, 2013 SCC 53	December 10, 2012	October 18, 2013
R v RL, 2013 SCC 54	October 18, 2013	October 18, 2013		V
R v Cairney, 2013 SCC 55	April 26, 2013	October 25, 2013
R v Pappas, 2013 SCC 56	April 26, 2013	October 25, 2013
Pro-Sys Consultants Ltd v Microsoft Corp, 2013 SCC 57	October 17, 2012	October 31, 2013
Sun-Rype Products Ltd v Archer Daniels Midland, 2013 SCC 58	October 17, 2012	October 31, 2013
Infineon Technologies AG v Option consommateurs, 2013 SCC 59	October 17, 2012	October 31, 2013
R v Vu, 2013 SCC 60	March 27, 2013	November 7, 2013
Case name	Argued	Decided	McLachlin	LeBel	Deschamps	Fish	Abella	Rothstein	Cromwell	Moldaver	Karakatsanis	Wagner
R v Hay, 2013 SCC 61	April 23, 2013	November 8, 2013
Alberta (Information and Privacy Commissioner) v United Food and Commercial Workers, Local 401, 2013 SCC 62	June 11, 2013	November 15, 2013
La Souveraine, Compagnie d'assurance générale v Autorité des marchés financiers, 2013 SCC 63	March 20, 2013	November 21, 2013		1		1	2
Katz Group Canada Inc v Ontario (Health and Long-Term Care), 2013 SCC 64	May 14, 2013	November 22, 2013
Quebec (Agence du Revenu) v Services Environnementaux AES inc, 2013 SCC 65	November 8, 2012	November 28, 2013
Amaratunga v Northwest Atlantic Fisheries Organization, 2013 SCC 66	March 28, 2013	November 29, 2013
McLean v British Columbia (Securities Commission), 2013 SCC 67	March 21, 2013	December 5, 2013
R v McRae, 2013 SCC 68	May 21, 2013	December 6, 2013
AIC Ltd v Fischer, 2013 SCC 68	April 18, 2013	December 12, 2013
IBM Canada Ltd v Waterman, 2013 SCC 70	December 14, 2012	December 13, 2013
Case name	Argued	Decided	McLachlin	LeBel	Deschamps	Fish	Abella	Rothstein	Cromwell	Moldaver	Karakatsanis	Wagner
Wood v Schaeffer, 2013 SCC 71	April 19, 2013	December 19, 2013
Canada (AG) v Bedford, 2013 SCC 72	June 13, 2013	December 20, 2013
Cinar Corp v Robinson, 2013 SCC 73	February 13, 2013	December 23, 2013
Case name	Argued	Decided	McLachlin	LeBel	Deschamps	Fish	Abella	Rothstein	Cromwell	Moldaver	Karakatsanis	Wagner

== 2013 Statistics ==
Justice	Reasons written	% Majority
Chief Justice Beverley McLachlin	9 / 1 / 0 / 1 / Total=11	52 of 61 (85.2%)
Puisne Justice Louis LeBel	12 / 1 / 1 / 3 / Total=17	52 of 61 (85.2%)
Puisne Justice Marie Deschamps	1 / 0 / 1 / 0 / Total=2	2 of 3 (66.7%)
Puisne Justice Morris Fish	6 / 3 / 1 / 5 / Total=15	49 of 62 (79%)
Pusine Justice Rosalie Abella	8 / 0 / 0 / 4 / Total=12	50 of 59 (84.7%)
Pusine Justice Marshall Rothstein	9 / 0 / 0 / 4 / Total=13	56 of 65 (86.2%)
Pusine Justice Thomas Cromwell	10 / 2 / 1 / 2 / Total=15	50 of 61 (82%%)
Pusine Justice Michael Moldaver	5 / 3 / 0 / 1 / Total=9	55 of 60 (91.7%)
Pusine Justice Andromache Karakatsanis	9 / 1 / 0 / 3 / Total=13	53 of 59 (89.8%)
Pusine Justice Richard Wagner	8 / 0 / 0 / 2 / Total=10	47 of 49 (95.9%)
Notes on statistics: A justice is only included in the majority if they have joined or concurred in the Court's judgment in full. Percentages are based only on the cases in which a justice participated, and are rounded to the nearest decimal.
