= 2015 reasons of the Supreme Court of Canada =

The table below lists the decisions (known as reasons) delivered from the bench by the Supreme Court of Canada during 2015. The table illustrates what reasons were filed by each justice in each case, and which justices joined each reason. This list, however, does not include reasons on motions.

== Reasons ==
Delivered the Court's reason
Joined the Court's reason
Filed a concurrence
Joined a concurrence
Filed a dissent
Joined a dissent
Filed a concurrence/dissent
Joined a concurrence/dissent
Did not participate in the judgment
Did not participate in the final disposition of the judgment
Not a member of the Court at the time of hearing or delivering
- Decisions that do not note a Justice delivering the Court's reason are per coram.
- Multiple concurrences and dissents within a case are numbered, with joining votes numbered accordingly. Justices occasionally join multiple reasons in a single case; each vote is subdivided accordingly.
- Multiple unnumbered reasons are jointly written or delivered.
- Decisions that are given orally from the bench are denoted by a "V"; per coram decisions delivered orally from the bench only note a "V" on the most senior justice on the panel.
- An asterisk ( * ) in the Court's opinion denotes that it was only a majority in part or a plurality.

Case name	Argued	Decided	McLachlin	LeBel	Abella	Rothstein	Cromwell	Moldaver	Karakatsanis	Wagner	Gascon	Côté	Brown
Mounted Police Association of Ontario v Canada (AG), 2015 SCC 1	February 18, 2014	January 16, 2015
Meredith v Canada (AG), 2015 SCC 2	February 19, 2014	January 16, 2015
Tervita Corp v Canada (Commissioner of Competition), 2015 SCC 3	March 27, 2014	January 22, 2015
Saskatchewan Federation of Labour v Saskatchewan, 2015 SCC 4	May 16, 2014	January 30, 2015
Carter v Canada (AG), 2015 SCC 5	October 15, 2014	February 6, 2015
R v Goleski, 2015 SCC 6	February 11, 2015	February 11, 2015			V
Canada (AG) v Federation of Law Societies of Canada, 2015 SCC 7	May 13, 2014	February 13, 2015
R v Perrone, 2015 SCC 8	February 19, 2015	February 19, 2015	V
R v Grant, 2015 SCC 9	November 14, 2014	March 5, 2015
Potter v New Brunswick Legal Aid Services Commission, 2015 SCC 10	May 12, 2014	March 6, 2015
Case name	Argued	Decided	McLachlin	LeBel	Abella	Rothstein	Cromwell	Moldaver	Karakatsanis	Wagner	Gascon	Côté	Brown
R v Araya, 2015 SCC 11	October 17, 2014	March 13, 2015
Société en commandite Place Mullins v Services immobiliers Diane Bisson inc, 2015 SCC 36	March 18, 2015	March 18, 2015
Loyola High School v Quebec (AG), 2015 SCC 12	March 24, 2014	March 19, 2015
R v Sanghera, 2015 SCC 13	March 19, 2015	March 19, 2015	V
Quebec (AG) v Canada (AG), 2015 SCC 14	October 8, 2014	March 27, 2015
R v Nur, 2015 SCC 15	November 7, 2014	April 14, 2015
Mouvement laïque québécois v Saguenay (City), 2015 SCC 16	October 14, 2014	April 15, 2015
Carey v Laiken, 2015 SCC 17	December 10, 2014	April 16, 2015
Theratechnologies inc v 121851 Canada inc, 2015 SCC 18	December 1, 2014	April 17, 2015
Zurich Insurance Co v Chubb Insurance Co of Canada, 2015 SCC 19	April 17, 2015	April 17, 2015			V
Case name	Argued	Decided	McLachlin	LeBel	Abella	Rothstein	Cromwell	Moldaver	Karakatsanis	Wagner	Gascon	Côté	Brown
Sanofi-Aventis v Apotex Inc, 2015 SCC 20	April 20, 2015	April 20, 2015	V
Canada (AG) v Barnaby, 2015 SCC 31	April 23, 2015	April 23, 2015
Caplin v Canada (Minister of Justice), 2015 SCC 32	April 23, 2015	April 23, 2015
Association des parents de l'école Rose-des-vents v British Columbia, 2015 SCC 21	December 2, 2014	April 24, 2015
Quebec (AG) v Canada (AG), 2015 SCC 22	April 24, 2015	April 24, 2015								V
White Burgess Langille Inman v Abbott and Haliburton Co, 2015 SCC 23	October 7, 2014	April 30, 2015
Henry v British Columbia (AG), 2015 SCC 24	November 13, 2014	May 1, 2015
Yukon Francophone School Board, Education Area #23 v Yukon (AG), 2015 SCC 25	January 21, 2015	May 14, 2015
Bowden Institution v Khadr, 2015 SCC 26	May 14, 2015	May 14, 2015	V
R v St-Cloud, 2015 SCC 27	November 6, 2014	May 15, 2015
Case name	Argued	Decided	McLachlin	LeBel	Abella	Rothstein	Cromwell	Moldaver	Karakatsanis	Wagner	Gascon	Côté	Brown
R v Kokopenace, 2015 SCC 28	October 6, 2014	May 21, 2015
R v Barabash, 2015 SCC 29	January 16, 2015	May 22, 2015
Kahkewistahaw First Nation v Taypotat, 2015 SCC 30	October 9, 2014	May 28, 2015
R v Tatton, 2015 SCC 33	December 9, 2014	June 4, 2015
R v Smith, 2015 SCC 34	March 20, 2015	June 11, 2015
Hinse v Canada (AG), 2015 SCC 35	November 10, 2014	June 19, 2015
Strickland v Canada (AG), 2015 SCC 37	January 20, 2015	July 9, 2015
R v Rodgerson, 2015 SCC 38	January 14, 2015	July 17, 2015
Quebec (Commission des droits de la personne et des droits de la jeunesse) v Bombardier Inc (Bombardier Aerospace Training Center), 2015 SCC 39	January 23, 2015	July 23, 2015
R v Simpson, 2015 SCC 40	February 12, 2015	July 30, 2015
Case name	Argued	Decided	McLachlin	LeBel	Abella	Rothstein	Cromwell	Moldaver	Karakatsanis	Wagner	Gascon	Côté	Brown
Guindon v Canada, 2015 SCC 41	December 5, 2014	July 31, 2015
Chevron Corp v Yaiguaje, 2015 SCC 42	December 11, 2014	September 4, 2015
Stuart Olson Dominion Construction Ltd v Structal Heavy Steel, 2015 SCC 43	January 19, 2015	September 18, 2015
Ontario (Energy Board) v Ontario Power Generation Inc, 2015 SCC 44	December 3, 2014	September 25, 2015
ATCO Gas and Pipelines Ltd v Alberta (Utilities Commission), 2015 SCC 45	December 3, 2014	September 25, 2015
R v Riesberry, 2015 SCC 65	October 13, 2015	October 13, 2015
Goodwin v British Columbia (Superintendent of Motor Vehicles), 2015 SCC 46	May 19, 2015	October 16, 2015
Wilson v British Columbia (Superintendent of Motor Vehicles), 2015 SCC 47	May 19, 2015	October 16, 2015
R v MJB, 2015 SCC 48	October 16, 2015	October 16, 2015			V
R v Neville, 2015 SCC 49	November 5, 2015	November 5, 2015	V
Case name	Argued	Decided	McLachlin	LeBel	Abella	Rothstein	Cromwell	Moldaver	Karakatsanis	Wagner	Gascon	Côté	Brown
R v Singh Riar, 2015 SCC 50	November 10, 2015	November 10, 2015	V
Alberta (AG) v Moloney, 2015 SCC 51	January 15, 2015	November 13, 2015
407 ETR Concession Co v Canada (Superintendent of Bankruptcy), 2015 SCC 52	January 15, 2015	November 13, 2015
Saskatchewan (AG) v Lemare Lake Logging Ltd, 2015 SCC 53	May 21, 2015	November 13, 2015
R v Hecimovic, 2015 SCC 54	November 13, 2015	November 13, 2015			V
R v Moriarty, 2015 SCC 55	May 12, 2015	November 19, 2015
Caron v Alberta, 2015 SCC 56	February 13, 2015	November 20, 2015
Canadian Broadcasting Corp v SODRAC 2003 Inc, 2015 SCC 57	March 16, 2015	November 26, 2015			1				2
B010 v Canada (Citizenship and Immigration), 2015 SCC 58	February 17, 2015	November 27, 2015
R v Appulonappa, 2015 SCC 59	February 17, 2015	November 27, 2015
Case name	Argued	Decided	McLachlin	LeBel	Abella	Rothstein	Cromwell	Moldaver	Karakatsanis	Wagner	Gascon	Côté	Brown
Canadian Imperial Bank of Commerce v Green, 2015 SCC 60	February 9, 2015	December 4, 2015	2			2		1	1		1	2
Kanthasamy v Canada (Citizen and Immigration), 2015 SCC 61	April 16, 2015	December 10, 2015
MM v United States of America, 2015 SCC 62	March 17, 2015	December 11, 2015
R v McKenna, 2015 SCC 63	December 11, 2015	December 11, 2015			V
R v Lacasse, 2015 SCC 64	May 15, 2015	December 17, 2015
Case name	Argued	Decided	McLachlin	LeBel	Abella	Rothstein	Cromwell	Moldaver	Karakatsanis	Wagner	Gascon	Côté	Brown

== 2015 statistics ==
Justice	Reasons written	% Majority
Chief Justice Beverley McLachlin	5 / 1 / 3 / 0 / Total=9
Puisne Justice Louis LeBel	2 / 0 / 0 / 1 / Total=3
Puisne Justice Rosalie Abella	7 / 2 / 2 / 4 / Total=13
Puisne Justice Marshall Rothstein	7 / 1 / 1 / 1 / Total=10
Puisne Justice Thomas Cromwell	10 / 2 / 0 / 1 / Total=13
Puisne Justice Michael Moldaver	6 / 0 / 2 / 2 / Total=10
Puisne Justice Andromache Karakatsanis	6 / 2 / 1 / 2 / Total=11
Puisne Justice Richard Wagner	6 / 1 / 2 / 2 / Total=11
Puisne Justice Clément Gascon	6 / 0 / 0 / 2 / Total=8
Puisne Justice Suzanne Côté	1 / 2 / 1 / 2 / Total=6
Puisne Justice Russell Brown	0 / 0 / 0 / 0 / Total=0
Notes on statistics: A justice is only included in the majority if they have joined or concurred in the Court's judgment in full. Percentages are based only on the cases in which a justice participated, and are rounded to the nearest decimal.
