= R v Neil =

- Supreme Court of Canada

Hearing: January 25, 2002 Judgment: November 1, 2002
- Full case name: David Lloyd Neil v Her Majesty The Queen
- Citations: [2002] 3 S.C.R. 631, 2002 SCC 70
- Docket No.: 28282
- Ruling: Appeal dismissed

Court membership
- Chief Justice: Beverley McLachlin; Puisne Justices: Claire L'Heureux-Dubé, Charles Gonthier, Frank Iacobucci, John C. Major, Michel Bastarache, Ian Binnie, Louise Arbour, Louis LeBel

Reasons given
- Unanimous reasons by: Binnie J.

R v Neil, [2002] 3 S.C.R. 631, 2002 SCC 70, is a leading decision of the Supreme Court of Canada on conflicts of interest among lawyers. The Court held that both firms and lawyers have a fiduciary duty of loyalty to their clients and so a lawyer or firm cannot represent a client whose interests may be adverse to the interests of another client unless there is consent and a reasonable belief that the interests will not be adverse. This greatly expanded the old rules of conflict of interest which required actual knowledge of confidential information before a lawyer was in conflict.

== Background ==
David Lloyd Neil was accused of a series of criminal charges. In his prior job he retained the legal services of a solicitor from an Edmonton law firm. Neil's assistant, Helen Lambert, had hired Gregory Lazin from the same firm to represent her in the relation to the charges. Lazin sat in on an interview with Neil's lawyer in order to gain advantage for his client. In a second incident, Lazin was approached by an old client of Neil named Doblanko who believed that Neil had fabricated a divorce document. Lazin referred him to the same police officer who was investigating Neil's other charges.

The issue was whether Lazin created a conflict of interest by assisting in establishing the charges against Neil, when he was a past client.

== Ruling of the Court ==
Justice Binnie, writing for the Court, dismissed the appeal. He held that the firm owed a duty of loyalty to Neil and should not have communicated with the other parties.

Binnie used the case as an opportunity to survey the meaning of a lawyer's duty of loyalty. He takes a strong stance, arguing that the duty is an essential to the integrity of the profession and the administration of justice. Loyalty promotes effective legal representation.

== Impact ==
While the "bright-line rule" stated in Neil was obiter to the case at hand, in 2007 it became the ratio for determining the later SCC case of Strother v. 3464920 Canada Inc. Although Strother was decided in part by a divided Court, the later case of Canadian National Railway Co. v. McKercher LLP in 2013, decided by a unanimous Court, clarified Canadian jurisprudence in this field.

== See also ==
- List of Supreme Court of Canada cases
