= Secure Energy Services =

Waste management company

SECURE Waste Infrastructure Corp.
- Type: Public
- Traded as: TSX: SES; S&P/TSX Composite Component
- Industry: Midstream Infrastructure
- Founded: 2007
- Founder: Rene Amirault
- Headquarters: Calgary, Alberta, Canada
- Key people: Allen Gransch (President and Chief Executive Officer)
- Website: http://secure.ca

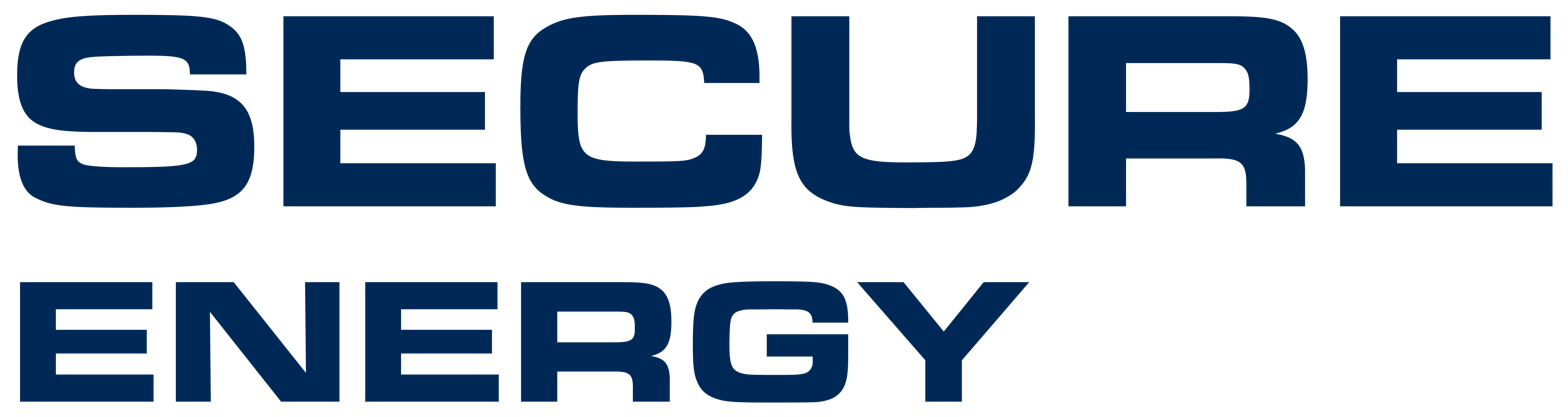
SECURE ENERGY logo

SECURE Waste Infrastructure Corp. (SECURE) is a Canadian public waste management company, based in Calgary, Alberta. It specializes in oilfield waste treatment and disposal. It is listed on the Toronto Stock Exchange.

== History ==
SECURE was founded in 2007 by Rene Amirault and several partners. It held an IPO in April 2010, raising C$57.5 million. At the time, it had nine facilities. In 2011, it acquired Marquis Alliance Energy Group for $131 million. By 2014, SECURE had 24 facilities, and 13% of the Canadian environmental services market.

In 2014 and 2015 SECURE experienced significant challenges due to decreasing oil prices. The company responded by laying off 300 workers, and its stock price decreased by half. In 2017, it acquired Ceiba Energy Services for $26 million, as part of the consolidation among energy services firms.

== Operations ==
SECURE primarily provides oilfield waste treatment and disposal, including of wastewater. As of 2018, it has 47 facilities in Western Canada and North Dakota, mostly in Alberta. Most of the locations are for waste processing and disposal, but the company also runs 4 rail terminals.

== Controversy ==
In December 2017, local residents and Métis leaders protested a planned oilsands landfill by the company outside of Conklin, Alberta. The protesters were concerned the landfill would contaminate waterways, scare wildlife, and create unpleasant smells. SECURE held an open house on December 7, 2017 to inform stakeholders about the project and the measures they take to ensure safe conditions in the communities they live and work in.

In July 2021, SECURE acquired Tervita after the expiry of the statutory waiting period and having defeated an emergency injunction application brought by the Commissioner to prevent closing of the Merger. SECURE therefore closed “at risk” knowing that its ownership of the Tervita business would be subject to complex, ongoing litigation that could ultimately result in significant divestitures.

In March 2023, the Competition Tribunal ruled in favor of the Commissioner of Competition in his challenge of SECURE's acquisition of Tervita Corporation. The Tribunal ordered SECURE to sell 29 facilities to resolve the substantial lessening of competition found in 136 relevant markets.
