= Tervita =

Canadian energy and waste services company

- Traded as: TSX: TEV
- Industry: Energy equipment and services
- Predecessor: CCS Corporation
- Founded: 1979
- Fate: Acquired by Secure Energy Services
- Headquarters: 1600, 140 - 10 Avenue SE, Calgary, Alberta, Canada
- Key people: John W. Cooper (CEO & President); David Paul Werklund (Founder); Grant Billing (Board Chair)
- Products: Energy & Environmental Waste services
- Number of employees: 1,600
- Website: tervita.com

Tervita was a public company based out of Alberta, Canada that specialized in energy and environmental waste services. It was co-founded by David P. Werklund as Concord Well Servicing in 1979. It became Canadian Crude Separators Corporation (CCS Corp.) in 1984. In 2012, twelve companies under CCS Corporation, to include CCS Midstream Services and Hazco, formed under Tervita.

== Profile ==
The company offered services to include oil field waste disposal, landfill remediation, demolition, metals recycling, water treatment, civil and environmental construction, oil sands exploration, construction drilling and oil spill clean-up. It serves clients with locations throughout Canada and the United States.

== History ==
In 1979, David Werklund and Gordon Vivian started Concord Well Servicing out of Valleyview, Alberta. With an investment from Werklund, CCS was formed in 1984, providing oil waste services. Hazco which provided water and environmental services was formed in 1989. Five years later CCS became a publicly traded company. Over the years Hazco and CCS acquire several energy and environmental waste-related companies. CCS would acquire Hazco in 2004. In 2007, CCS renames itself CCS Corporation and goes private. In 2012, the twelve similar companies combine under CCS Corporation and form Tervita.

In January 2015, the company won a Supreme Court of Canada decision, allowing it to develop a landfill in northeastern British Columbia through the CAD$6 million acquisition of Complete Environmental Inc. The plaintiff argued that Tervita would own all three landfills in northeast British Columbia and therefore it would eliminate competition. The decision was significant as the acquisition was small and it set the framework for future decisions based on market competition in Canada.

On July 19, 2018 Tervita Corporation and Newalta Corporation announced that they closed their previously announced business combination. The merged company operates under the name Tervita Corporation.

On July 2, 2021 Tervita was acquired by Secure Energy Services in an all-stock transaction.
