= Canadian National Railway Co v McKercher LLP =

- Supreme Court of Canada

Hearing: 24 January 2013 Judgment: 5 July 2013
- Full case name: Canadian National Railway Company v. McKercher LLP and Gordon Wallace
- Citations: 2013 SCC 39
- Docket No.: 34545
- Prior history: APPEAL from Wallace v Canadian Pacific Railway, 2011 SKCA 108 (28 September 2011), setting aside Wallace v. Canadian Pacific Railway, 2009 SKQB 369 (21 September 2009)
- Ruling: Appeal allowed; case remanded to court of first instance for final determination

Holding
- The bright-line rule concerning a duty of loyalty by a lawyer to his client, first stated in R. v. Neil, applies in this matter, and disqualification may be necessary to maintain the repute of the administration of justice

Court membership
- Chief Justice: Beverley McLachlin; Puisne Justices: Louis LeBel, Marie Deschamps, Morris Fish, Rosalie Abella, Marshall Rothstein, Thomas Cromwell, Michael Moldaver, Andromache Karakatsanis, Richard Wagner

Reasons given
- Unanimous reasons by: McLachlin CJ

Canadian National Railway Co v McKercher LLP is a significant case of the Supreme Court of Canada that consolidated Canadian jurisprudence on conflicts of interest in the legal profession.

== Background ==
The Supreme Court of Canada has recast Canadian jurisprudence in recent years concerning professional conflicts of interest in the legal profession. In its 1990 ruling in Macdonald Estate v. Martin, it first addressed the question of confidential information being handled by lawyers.

In 2002, the SCC dealt with the question of loyalty, ruling in R. v. Neil that the question of whether a conflict of interest may exist in how lawyers deal with clients was subject to a bright-line rule, where a lawyer, and by extension a law firm, may not concurrently represent clients adverse in interest without first obtaining their consent. While this was obiter to the case at hand, in 2007 it became the ratio for determining the later SCC case of Strother v. 3464920 Canada Inc.

== The case at hand ==
In 2008, McKercher LLP (a large law firm in Saskatchewan) was representing Canadian National Railway with respect to various corporate matters within the province. In the same year, it also accepted a retainer from Gordon Wallace to act against CN in a $1.75 billion class action based on allegations that CN had illegally overcharged Western Canadian farmers for grain transportation. McKercher did not advise CN that it intended to accept the Wallace retainer, and CN only learned of it when it was served with the statement of claim in 2009. All of McKercher's dealings with CN were subsequently terminated that year, On McKercher's initiative in some matters, and on CN's initiative in another.

Following receipt of the statement of claim, CN applied for an order removing McKercher as solicitor of record for Wallace in the class action against it, on the grounds that McKercher:

- had breached its duty of loyalty to CN by placing itself in a conflict of interest,
- had improperly terminated its existing CN retainers, and
- might misuse confidential information gained in the course of the solicitor-client relationship.

== The courts below ==
At the Court of Queen's Bench for Saskatchewan, Popescul J found that the firm had breached the duty of loyalty it owed CN, and the relationship was "materially and adversely affected" by its decision to accept the Wallace retainer, indicated by several relevant factors:

- the long-standing relationship McKercher had with CN, spanning more than a decade,
- its preferred status with CN, being appointed as its power of attorney in the province,
- the magnitude of the claim in the class action,
- as the new claim was a litigation matter, it would undoubtedly be adversarial,
- the nature of the matter, being a class action claim,
- the remedy sought, being aggravated damages and punitive damages,
- CN's sensitivity in the matter,
- the role of the law firm in the class action litigation, and
- the fact that CN's objection was principled, and not just for tactical advantage in the case.

The Queen's Bench ruling was overturned by the Court of Appeal for Saskatchewan. In his ruling, Ottenbreit JA held that:

- understanding CN's litigation strengths and weaknesses did not constitute relevant confidential information warranting disqualification,
- CN was a large corporate client that was not in a position of vulnerability or dependency with respect to McKercher, so its implied consent to McKercher acting for an opposing party in unrelated legal matters could be inferred,
- McKercher had breached its duty of loyalty towards CN by peremptorily terminating the solicitor-client relationship on its existing files for CN, but
- disqualification was not an appropriate remedy in this case, since the termination of McKercher's relationship with CN assured that McKercher's continued representation of Wallace created no risk of prejudice in the matter

== At the Supreme Court of Canada ==
The appeal was allowed by the SCC. In a unanimous ruling, McLachlin CJ identified several key issues.

=== The role of the Courts ===
The courts have inherent powers to resolve issues of conflicts in cases that may come before them. This is not to be confused with the statutory powers conferred on the legal profession by the various legislatures, as the courts are concerned with the administration of justice, and the various law societies are concerned with the good governance of the profession.

=== The governing principles ===
A lawyer owes his client a duty of loyalty, which has three dimensions:

1. a duty to avoid conflicting interests,
2. a duty of commitment to the client's cause, and
3. a duty of candour.

With regard to the first dimension, the nature of the bright line rule stated in Neil and Strother was clarified:

[31] The bright line rule holds that a law firm cannot act for a client whose interests are adverse to those of another existing client, unless both clients consent. It applies regardless of whether the client matters are related or unrelated.... [32] However, Neil and Strother make it clear that the scope of the rule is not unlimited. The rule applies where the immediate legal interests of clients are directly adverse. It does not apply to condone tactical abuses. And it does not apply in circumstances where it is unreasonable to expect that the lawyer will not concurrently represent adverse parties in unrelated legal matters....

In that regard:

1. the bright line rule applies only where the immediate interests of clients are directly adverse in the matters on which the lawyer is acting,
2. it applies only when clients are adverse in legal interest,
3. it cannot be successfully raised by a party who seeks to abuse it, and
4. it does not apply in circumstances where it is unreasonable for a client to expect that its law firm will not act against it in unrelated matters (e.g. "professional litigants" such as banks, governments or insurance companies). Some relevant factors to this question are the nature of the relationship between the law firm and the client, the terms of the retainer and the types of matters involved.

=== Application of the principles ===
In the case at hand:

1. McKercher breached the bright line rule stated in Neil, and by extension its duty to avoid conflicting interests, when it accepted to represent Wallace without first obtaining CN's informed consent.
2. A law firm cannot terminate a client relationship purely in an attempt to circumvent its duty of loyalty to that client.
3. A lawyer must not "keep the client in the dark about matters he or she knows to be relevant to the retainer."

=== The appropriate remedy ===
Disqualification may be required:

1. to avoid the risk of improper use of confidential information (where it is generally the appropriate remedy),
2. to avoid the risk of impaired representation (normally required if the law firm continues to concurrently act for both clients), and/or
3. to maintain the repute of the administration of justice.

In the last case, the courts must consider several factors in arriving at the appropriate decision:

1. behaviour disentitling the complaining party from seeking the removal of counsel, such as delay in bringing the motion for disqualification,
2. significant prejudice to the new client's interest in retaining its counsel of choice, and that party's ability to retain new counsel, and
3. the fact that the law firm accepted the conflicting retainer in good faith, reasonably believing that the concurrent representation fell beyond the scope of the bright line rule and applicable law society restrictions.

In the current appeal, only the last case was relevant, and the matter was remanded back to the court of first instance to be decided in accordance with these reasons:

[67] As discussed, a violation of the bright line rule on its face supports disqualification, even where the lawyer-client relationship has been terminated as a result of the breach. However, it is also necessary to weigh the factors identified above, which may suggest that disqualification is inappropriate in the circumstances. The motion judge did not have the benefit of these reasons, and obviously could not consider all of the factors just discussed that are relevant to the issue of disqualification. These reasons recast the legal framework for judging McKercher's conduct and determining the appropriate remedy. Fairness suggests that the issue of remedy should be remitted to the court for consideration in accordance with them.

== Impact ==
McKercher consolidated and clarified the case law in this field, and was seen as a statement that the bright line rule in Neil was to be firmly applied, and not to be treated as a rebuttable presumption.

The bright line rule has also been integrated by Law Societies in ethics codes such as at article 3.4-1 of the Model Code of Professional Conduct of the Federation of Law Societies of Canada.
