= Wilson v Alharayeri =

- Supreme Court of Canada

Hearing: 29 November 2016 Judgment: 13 July 2017
- Full case name: Andrus Wilson v Ramzi Mahmoud Alharayeri
- Citations: 2017 SCC 39
- Docket No.: 36689
- Prior history: APPEAL from Black c. Alharayeri
- Ruling: Appeal dismissed

Holding
- The CBCA's oppression remedy contemplates liability not only for the corporation, but also for other parties, but oppressive conduct by others must be properly attributable because of implication in the oppression, and imposition of personal liability must be fit in all the circumstances.

Court membership
- Chief Justice: Beverley McLachlin; Puisne Justices: Rosalie Abella, Michael Moldaver, Andromache Karakatsanis, Richard Wagner, Clément Gascon, Suzanne Côté, Russell Brown, Malcolm Rowe

Reasons given
- Unanimous reasons by: Côté J

Laws applied
- Canada Business Corporations Act

Wilson v Alharayeri is a leading case of the Supreme Court of Canada which significantly extends the application of the oppression remedy under the Canada Business Corporations Act to include non-corporate parties.

== Background ==
In 2005, A initiated a management buyout of a Wi-Fi manufacturing operation, and the buyout was completed by way of a reverse takeover with an interested financier. At the closing, the operation became Wi2Wi Corporation, and A received shares that were structured in three classes: 2 million common shares, 1 million Class A Convertible Preferred Shares ("A shares") and 1.5 million Class B Convertible Preferred Shares ("B shares"). Class C Convertible Preferred Shares ("C Shares") were also issued to other persons instrumental in finding new investors to participate in the transaction. The financing was inadequate for ensuring continuing operations, thus preventing an anticipated IPO in 2006.

In 2007, negotiations began with Mitec Telecom Inc ("Mitec") for enabling it to acquire an interest in Wi2Wi. The first round failed when the Wi2Wi board refused to accept the resulting agreement, after which A resigned his position as chief executive officer. A second round of negotiations ensued with Mitec resulted in several offers at a lower price. At the same time, a private placement of convertible notes was issued to the common shareholders, prior to which the C shares were converted into common shares. The Wi2Wi board decided that Mitec could not acquire more than 8% of A's common shares. (Note: no mention was made of the A or B shares) Mitec decided to walk away. Since that time, A sought to convert his A and B shares into common shares, but was not informed of, and did not participate in, subsequent shareholders' meetings. Wi2Wi was later acquired in a reverse takeover by another company in 2012.

A sued the Directors, alleging that their conduct was unfair and oppressive against him in:

1. their refusal to finalize the conversion of A's Series A shares;
2. their refusal to finalise the conversion of A's Series B shares;
3. their unreasonable refusal to allow A's sale of 300,000 common shares in 2007;
4. their frustration of Mitec's offers to purchase the Corporation's shares;
5. their efforts to dilute A's shares in the Corporation;
6. their refusals to call shareholder meetings; and
7. their refusals to disclose Wi2Wi's financial information.

== The courts below ==
=== At trial ===
In the Superior Court of Quebec, Hamilton JSC held that oppressive conduct occurred in the first two grounds (including the related failure that A's rights were not prejudiced by the private placement), but dismissed all other allegations. In considering what would be an appropriate remedy in the matter, he identified the following issues:

1. Did the oppressive conduct cause the damage claimed?
2. Is the damage properly evaluated?
3. Is the damage claimed against the proper parties?
4. What is the appropriate way to deal with the residual value of the shares?
5. From what date should interest and the additional indemnity be awarded?

In reviewing the jurisprudence concerning oppressive conduct with respect to share transactions, the trial judge observed that certain guiding principles have emerged:

- The motive behind the share issue is of great importance. A share issuance motivated by an improper purpose is oppressive. However, a share issue may be oppressive even where the purpose was proper. The Courts will examine the balance between corporate benefit and individual harm.
- Extending the offering to all shareholders reduces the likelihood of oppression, but is not determinative. The share issue will be oppressive where the decision to issue shares is motivated by the knowledge that the applicant cannot accept the invitation to participate.
- Where the proponents of the share issuance benefit by obtaining increased control of the corporation, Courts will view the transaction with much greater suspicion.:* Issuing shares in the face of another dispute with the applicant creates an inference of oppression that requires strong evidence of a legitimate corporate purpose to overcome.
- Share offerings at a discount to book value, without a proper assessment of value or for otherwise inadequate consideration, are also oppressive.

In addition, it was noted that the Ontario Court of Appeal, in its 1998 ruling in Budd v Gentra Inc, had previously ruled that corporate directors could be held personally liable with respect to oppressive conduct.

He held that causation was proven, but only two of the four directors played a leading role at the Board level and benefited from the private placement. Accordingly, they were solidary liable for damages, interest and additional indemnity from the date of service of the action. A was ordered to remit the share certificates for the A and B shares to the defendants B and W.

=== On appeal ===
B and W appealed to the Quebec Court of Appeal, raising four questions to be addressed:

1. Did the trial judge err by concluding that the appellants' "lead roles in the discussions at the Board level" justified that they be held personally liable as directors of the impleaded party?
2. Did the trial judge violate the audi alteram partem rule in concluding that the appellants had obtained a personal benefit from the failure to convert the respondent's preferred shares by relying on facts that had not been alleged and arguments that had not been raised?
3. Did the trial judge err by not taking into account the dilution caused by the private placement when he assessed the existence of a causal connection between the failure to convert the respondent's preferred shares into common shares on the one hand and the monetary loss alleged by the respondent on the other?
4. Did the trial judge err in his determination of the value of the common shares that would have been substituted for the respondent's preferred shares, and did he err by failing to estimate the residuary value of the preferred shares?

All grounds were dismissed, as the trial judge had made no errors in his decision. The court also expanded on the discussion relating to Budd v Gentra, noting that certain situations will lend themselves to holdings of personal liability where:

- directors obtain a personal benefit financial benefit from their conduct;
- directors have increased their control of the corporation by the oppressive conduct;
- directors have breached a personal duty they have as directors;
- directors have misused a corporate power;
- a remedy against the corporation would prejudice other security holders;

but it has also been held that appellate courts owe a high degree of deference to judgments rendered on oppression remedies.

A filed a cross-appeal with respect to the amount of damages assessed. It was dismissed, as the trial judge was held to have reached a decision that was reasonable in the circumstances.

W appealed to the Supreme Court of Canada, challenging the trial judge's conclusion that it was fit to hold him personally liable for the oppressive conduct.

== At the Supreme Court of Canada ==
In a unanimous decision, the appeal was dismissed. In her ruling, Côté J noted that it raised two pertinent issues:

1. When may personal liability for oppression be imposed on corporate directors?
2. Were the pleadings sufficient to ground the imposition of personal liability in this case?

=== Personal liability ===
Bad faith, personal control and personal benefit, while they are indicators, are not necessary criteria for determining personal liability. It was noted that "the oppression remedy exists to rectify harm to the complainant. It is not a gain-based remedy." Gain-based remedies "are... a striking form of redress insofar as they represent a departure from the norm of loss-based or compensatory relief." Therefore:

Treating a personal benefit as a necessary condition to a director's personal liability inappropriately emphasizes the gain to the director, at the expense of considering the oppressive conduct leading to the complainant's loss. For example, oppressive conduct that does not yield a personal benefit may trigger personal liability where the director acts in bad faith or in a Machiavellian fashion (for instance, where the director seeks to punish a shareholder for interpersonal reasons regardless of whether that punishment brings the director any personal benefit). But treating a personal benefit as a necessary condition would preclude personal liability in such a case, where it may otherwise be a fit and fair remedy. Further, demanding a strict correlation between the complainant's loss and the director's benefit would imbue an otherwise discretionary, equitable remedy that looks to commercial realities with a legal formalism inimical to its remedial purpose.

"Bad faith" is not a criterion in itself, as the CBCA talks about conduct "that is oppressive or unfairly prejudicial to or that unfairly disregards the interests [of any stakeholder]". Therefore, "Conduct may run afoul of s. 241 even when it is driven by lesser states of mental culpability".

Budd v Gentra was seen as providing a two-pronged approach:

1. the oppressive conduct must be properly attributable to the director because he or she is implicated in the oppression; and
2. the imposition of personal liability must be fit in all the circumstances.

In that regard, four principles can be discerned from the jurisprudence:

1. the oppression remedy request must in itself be a fair way of dealing with the situation;
2. any order (Note: made under s. 241(3) of the CBCA) should go no further than necessary to rectify the oppression;
3. such orders may serve only to vindicate the reasonable expectations of security holders, creditors, directors or officers in their capacity as corporate stakeholders; and
4. director liability cannot be a surrogate for other forms of statutory or common law relief, particularly where such other relief may be more fitting in the circumstances.

=== Sufficient grounds for imposition ===
The pleadings were sufficient, because:

- specific allegations had been made that the directors "acted in their own personal interest" and "to the detriment of Wi2Wi and its shareholder in focusing mainly on their personal financial gains";
- damages were specifically sought against the directors, and not against the corporation;
- legal authorities that were cited by the appellant were not relevant in this matter, as they were distinguishable on their facts; and
- a right of appeal is not a backstop for procedural choices made prior to trial.

== Impact ==
The ruling serves as a warning to directors not to place themselves in situations in which their decisions result in a personal benefit or may be construed as bad faith. They should avoid any conduct that is oppressive, unfairly prejudicial or that unfairly disregards the interests of any stakeholder, as the equitable jurisdiction available to the courts is very broad.
