= 2012 reasons of the Supreme Court of Canada =

The table below lists the decisions (known as reasons) delivered from the bench by the Supreme Court of Canada during 2012. The table illustrates what reasons were filed by each justice in each case, and which justices joined each reason. This list, however, does not include reasons on motions.

== Reasons ==
Delivered the Court's reason
Joined the Court's reason
Filed a concurrence
Joined a concurrence
Filed a dissent
Joined a dissent
Filed a concurrence/dissent
Joined a concurrence/dissent
Did not participate in the judgment
Did not participate in the final disposition of the judgment
Not a member of the Court at the time of hearing or delivering
- Decisions that do not note a Justice delivering the Court's reason are per coram.
- Multiple concurrences and dissents within a case are numbered, with joining votes numbered accordingly. Justices occasionally join multiple reasons in a single case; each vote is subdivided accordingly.
- Multiple unnumbered reasons are jointly written or delivered.
- Decisions that are given orally from the bench are denoted by a "V"; per coram decisions delivered orally from the bench only note a "V" on the most senior justice on the panel.
- An asterisk ( * ) in the Court's opinion denotes that it was only a majority in part or a plurality.

Case name	Argued	Decided	McLachlin	Binnie	LeBel	Deschamps	Fish	Abella	Charron	Rothstein	Cromwell	Moldaver	Karakatsanis	Wagner
Toronto Dominion Bank v Canada, 2012 SCC 1	January 12, 2012	January 12, 2012			V
Catalyst Paper Corp v North Cowichan (District), 2012 SCC 2	October 18, 2011	January 20, 2012
Merck Frosst Canada Ltd v Canada (Health), 2012 SCC 3	November 12, 2010	February 3, 2012
Reference Re Broadcasting Act, 2012 SCC 4	January 16, 2012	February 9, 2012
R v DAI, 2012 SCC 5	May 17, 2011	February 10, 2012
R v TLM, 2012 SCC 6	February 14, 2012	February 14, 2012				V
SL v Commission scolaire des Chênes, 2012 SCC 7	May 18, 2011	February 17, 2012
Richard v Time Inc, 2012 SCC 8	January 18, 2011	February 28, 2012
Momentous.ca Corp v Canadian American Association of Professional Baseball Ltd, 2012 SCC 9	February 10, 2012	March 15, 2012
Halifax (Regional Municipality) v Nova Scotia (Human Rights Commission), 2012 SCC 10	October 19, 2011	March 16, 2012
Case name	Argued	Decided	McLachlin	Binnie	LeBel	Deschamps	Fish	Abella	Charron	Rothstein	Cromwell	Moldaver	Karakatsanis	Wagner
R v Eastgaard, 2012 SCC 11	March 21, 2012	March 21, 2012	V
Doré v Barreau du Québec, 2012 SCC 12	January 26, 2011	March 22, 2012
R v Ipeelee, 2012 SCC 13	October 17, 2011	March 23, 2012
Fundy Settlement v Canada, 2012 SCC 14	March 13, 2012	April 12, 2012
R v Kociuk, 2012 SCC 15	April 12, 2012	April 12, 2012	V
R v Tse, 2012 SCC 16	November 18, 2011	April 13, 2012
Club Resorts Ltd v Van Breda, 2012 SCC 17	March 21, 2011	April 18, 2012
Éditions Écosociété Inc v Banro Corp, 2012 SCC 18	March 25, 2011	April 18, 2012
Breeden v Black, 2012 SCC 19	March 22, 2011	April 18, 2012
Calgary (City) v Canada, 2012 SCC 20	November 15, 2011	April 26, 2012
Case name	Argued	Decided	McLachlin	Binnie	LeBel	Deschamps	Fish	Abella	Charron	Rothstein	Cromwell	Moldaver	Karakatsanis	Wagner
R v Jesse, 2012 SCC 21	December 9, 2011	April 27, 2012
R v RP, 2012 SCC 22	December 16, 2011	May 11, 2012
Tessier Ltée v Quebec (Commission de la santé et de la sécurité du travail), 2012 SCC 23	January 17, 2012	May 17, 2012
R v Maybin, 2012 SCC 24	December 15, 2011	May 18, 2012
R v Roy, 2012 SCC 26	November 9, 2011	June 1, 2012
Annapolis County District School Board v Marshall, 2012 SCC 27	May 8, 2012	June 7, 2012
R v Gibbons, 2012 SCC 28	December 14, 2011	June 8, 2012
Halifax (Regional Municipality) v Canada (Public Works and Government Services), 2012 SCC 29	December 12, 2011	June 15, 2012
Westmount (City) v Rossy, 2012 SCC 30	February 13, 2012	June 22, 2012
R v Mayuran, 2012 SCC 31	April 19, 2012	June 28, 2012
Case name	Argued	Decided	McLachlin	Binnie	LeBel	Deschamps	Fish	Abella	Charron	Rothstein	Cromwell	Moldaver	Karakatsanis	Wagner
Clements v Clements, 2012 SCC 32	February 17, 2012	June 29, 2012
R v Venneri, 2012 SCC 33	April 16, 2012	July 6, 2012
Entertainment Software Association v Society of Composers, Authors and Music Publishers of Canada, 2012 SCC 34	December 6, 2011	July 12, 2012
Rogers Communications Inc v Society of Composers, Authors and Music Publishers of Canada, 2012 SCC 35	December 6, 2011	July 12, 2012
Society of Composers, Authors and Music Publishers of Canada v Bell Canada, 2012 SCC 36	December 6, 2011	July 12, 2012
Alberta (Education) v Canadian Copyright Licensing Agency (Access Copyright), 2012 SCC 37	December 7, 2011	July 12, 2012
Re Sound v Motion Picture Theatre Associations of Canada, 2012 SCC 38	December 7, 2011	July 12, 2012
R v Punko, 2012 SCC 39	March 21, 2012	July 20, 2012
R v Vu, 2012 SCC 40	February 15, 2012	July 26, 2012
R v Walle, 2012 SCC 41	April 13, 2012	July 27, 2012
Case name	Argued	Decided	McLachlin	Binnie	LeBel	Deschamps	Fish	Abella	Charron	Rothstein	Cromwell	Moldaver	Karakatsanis	Wagner
R v Knott, 2012 SCC 42	December 14, 2011	July 31, 2012
Canada v Craig, 2012 SCC 43	March 23, 2012	August 1, 2012
R v Bellusci, 2012 SCC 44	February 16, 2012	August 3, 2012
Canada (AG) v Downtown East Side Sex Workers United Against Violence Society et al, 2012 SCC 45	January 19, 2012	September 21, 2012
AB v Bragg Communications Inc, 2012 SCC 46	May 10, 2012	September 27, 2012
R v Mabior, 2012 SCC 47	February 8, 2012	October 5, 2012
R v DC, 2012 SCC 48	February 8, 2012	October 5, 2012
R v Prokofiew, 2012 SCC 49	November 8, 2011	October 12, 2012
R v Rochon, 2012 SCC 50	October 16, 2012	October 16, 2012					V
Southcott Estates Inc v Toronto Catholic District School Board, 2012 SCC 51	March 20, 2012	October 17, 2012
Case name	Argued	Decided	McLachlin	Binnie	LeBel	Deschamps	Fish	Abella	Charron	Rothstein	Cromwell	Moldaver	Karakatsanis	Wagner
Canada v GlaxoSmithKline Inc, 2012 SCC 52	January 13, 2012	October 18, 2012
R v Cole, 2012 SCC 53	May 15, 2012	October 19, 2012
R v Picot, 2012 SCC 54	October 19, 2012	October 19, 2012			V
Opitz v Wrzesnewskyj, 2012 SCC 55	July 10, 2012	October 25, 2012
R v Boudreault, 2012 SCC 56	June 6, 2012	October 26, 2012
R v St-Onge Lamoureux, 2012 SCC 57	October 13, 2011	November 2, 2012
R v Dineley, 2012 SCC 58	October 13, 2011	November 2, 2012
R v Nedelcu, 2012 SCC 59	March 16, 2012	November 7, 2012
Teva Canada Ltd v Pfizer Canada Inc, 2012 SCC 60	April 18, 2012	November 8, 2012
Moore v British Columbia (Education), 2012 SCC 61	March 22, 2012	November 9, 2012
Case name	Argued	Decided	McLachlin	Binnie	LeBel	Deschamps	Fish	Abella	Charron	Rothstein	Cromwell	Moldaver	Karakatsanis	Wagner
R v PDT, 2012 SCC 62	November 9, 2012	November 9, 2012	V
R v DJW, 2012 SCC 63	November 16, 2012	November 16, 2012			V
Canada (AG) v Kane, 2012 SCC 64	November 6, 2012	November 23, 2012
Construction Labour Relations v Driver Iron Inc, 2012 SCC 65	November 15, 2012	November 29, 2012
R v Aucoin, 2012 SCC 66	May 16, 2012	November 30, 2012
Newfoundland and Labrador v AbitibiBowater Inc, 2012 SCC 67	November 16, 2011	December 7, 2012	1		2
Reference Re Broadcasting Regulatory Policy CRTC 2010-167 and Broadcasting Order CRTC 2010-168, 2012 SCC 68	April 17, 2012	December 13, 2012
R v Khawaja, 2012 SCC 69	June 11, 2012	December 14, 2012
Sriskandarajah v United States of America, 2012 SCC 70	June 11, 2012	December 14, 2012
Professional Institute of the Public Service of Canada v Canada (AG), 2012 SCC 71	February 9, 2012	December 19, 2012
Case name	Argued	Decided	McLachlin	Binnie	LeBel	Deschamps	Fish	Abella	Charron	Rothstein	Cromwell	Moldaver	Karakatsanis	Wagner
R v NS, 2012 SCC 72	December 8, 2011	December 20, 2012
R v Yumnu, 2012 SCC 73	March 15, 2012	December 21, 2012
R v Emms, 2012 SCC 74	March 15, 2012	December 21, 2012
R v Davey, 2012 SCC 75	March 15, 2012	December 21, 2012
Case name	Argued	Decided	McLachlin	Binnie	LeBel	Deschamps	Fish	Abella	Charron	Rothstein	Cromwell	Moldaver	Karakatsanis	Wagner

== 2012 Statistics ==
Justice	Reasons written	% Majority
Chief Justice Beverley McLachlin	11 / 0 / 0 / 3 / Total=14	58 of 63 (92.1%)
Puisne Justice Ian Binnie	0 / 0 / 0 / 1 / Total=1	4 of 5 (80%)
Puisne Justice Louis LeBel	11 / 2 / 0 / 4 / Total=17	58 of 67 (86.6%)
Puisne Justice Marie Deschamps	9 / 0 / 0 / 1 / Total=10	58 of 61 (95.1%)
Puisne Justice Morris Fish	6 / 1 / 0 / 3 / Total=10	56 of 65 (86.2%)
Pusine Justice Rosalie Abella	8 / 1 / 0 / 3 / Total=12	64 of 67 (95.5%)
Puisne Justice Louise Charron	0 / 0 / 0 / 0 / Total=0	4 of 4 (100%)
Pusine Justice Marshall Rothstein	7 / 0 / 0 / 3 / Total=10	61 of 68 (89.7%)
Pusine Justice Thomas Cromwell	6 / 0 / 1 / 5 / Total=12	55 of 65 (84.6%)
Pusine Justice Michael Moldaver	11 / 0 / 0 / 0 / Total=11	53 of 53 (100%)
Pusine Justice Andromache Karakatsanis	4 / 0 / 0 / 0 / Total=4	51 of 52 (98.1%)
Pusine Justice Richard Wagner	0 / 0 / 0 / 0 / Total=0	2 of 2 (100%)
Notes on statistics: A justice is only included in the majority if they have joined or concurred in the Court's judgment in full. Percentages are based only on the cases in which a justice participated, and are rounded to the nearest decimal.
