= Ernst v EnCana Corporation =

Ernst v. EnCana Corporation, 2013 ABQB 537 is a lawsuit by Jessica Ernst against EnCana Corporation, the Energy Resources Conservation Board, and Her Majesty the Queen in Right of Alberta. EnCana is accused of contaminating, by its hydraulic fracturing, the Rosebud aquifer near Rosebud, Alberta, and the Ernst water well. The claim is supported by the rule in Rylands v Fletcher.

== See also ==
- Ernst v Alberta Energy Regulator
