= Google Inc v Equustek Solutions Inc =

- Supreme Court of Canada

Hearing: December 6, 2016 Judgment: June 28, 2017
- Citations: 2017 SCC 34
- Prior history: APPEAL from Google Inc v Equustek Solutions Inc, 2015 BCCA 265, affirming Google Inc. v. Equustek Solutions Inc, 2014 BCSC 1063
- Ruling: Appeal dismissed.

Court membership
- Chief Justice: Beverley McLachlin; Puisne Justices: Rosalie Abella, Michael Moldaver, Andromache Karakatsanis, Richard Wagner, Clément Gascon, Suzanne Côté, Russell Brown, Malcolm Rowe

Reasons given
- Majority: Abella J, joined by McLachlin CJ and Moldaver, Karakatsanis, Wagner, Gascon and Brown JJ
- Dissent: Côté and Rowe JJ

Google Inc v Equustek Solutions Inc was a 2017 decision of the Supreme Court of Canada dealing with the authority to issue injunctions against foreign companies.

== Aftermath ==
On November 2, 2017, a California district court granted an injunction against the enforcement of the order of the Supreme Court of Canada on the grounds that the order undermines the US law and threatens freedom of speech.

However, The Court of British Columbia dismissed Google's application (2018 BCSC 610) to respect the US judgment saying
The effect of the U.S. order is that no action can be taken against Google to enforce the injunction in U.S. courts. That does not restrict the ability of this Court to protect the integrity of its own process through orders directed to parties over whom it has personal jurisdiction.

== See also ==
- List of Supreme Court of Canada cases (McLachlin Court)
