= Wood v Schaeffer =

- Supreme Court of Canada

Hearing: 19 April 2013 Judgment: 19 December 2013
- Full case name: Police Constable Kris Wood, Acting Sergeant Mark Pullbrook and Police Constable Graham Seguin (Appellants/Respondents on cross-appeal) v Ruth Schaeffer, Evelyn Minty, Diane Pinder and Ian Scott, Director of the Special Investigations Unit (Respondents/Appellants on cross-appeal) and Julian Fantino, Commissioner of the Ontario Provincial Police (Respondent/Respondent on cross-appeal)
- Citations: 2013 SCC 71
- Docket No.: 34621
- Prior history: APPEAL and CROSS‑APPEAL from Schaeffer v. Wood, 2011 ONCA 716 (15 November 2011), setting aside Schaeffer v. Woods, 2010 ONSC 3647 (23 June 2010)
- Ruling: Appeal dismissed and cross‑appeal allowed

Court membership
- Chief Justice: Beverley McLachlin; Puisne Justices: Louis LeBel, Marie Deschamps, Morris Fish, Rosalie Abella, Marshall Rothstein, Thomas Cromwell, Michael Moldaver, Andromache Karakatsanis, Richard Wagner

Reasons given
- Majority: Moldaver J
- Concur/dissent: LeBel and Cromwell JJ, joined by Fish J

Wood v Schaeffer is a significant ruling of the Supreme Court of Canada concerning procedural requirements involving incidents arising from police misconduct.

== Background ==
In June 2009, in two separate incidents, officers of the Ontario Provincial Police shot and killed suspects (Minty and Schaeffer) in their investigations. Ontario's Special Investigations Unit, as required by provincial law, investigated and reported. In the Minty investigation, the SIU Director concluded that "the lethal force used was not excessive" in the circumstances, but indicated that all witness officers had been instructed not to write up their notes until they had spoken to counsel. In the Schaeffer investigation, the Director concluded that he could not form reasonable and probable grounds to believe that a criminal offence had been committed, as he could not rely on the information supplied by the police officers. He stated:

This note writing process flies in the face of the two main indicators of reliability of notes: independence and contemporaneity. The notes do not represent an independent recitation of the material events. The first drafts have been "approved" by an [Ontario Provincial Police Association] lawyer who represented all of the involved officers in this matter, a lawyer who has a professional obligation to share information among his clients when jointly retained by them. Nor are the notes the most contemporaneous ones — they were not written as soon as practicable and the first drafts remain in the custody of their lawyer. I am denied the opportunity to compare the first draft with the final entries. Accordingly, the only version of the material events are association lawyer approved notes. Due to their lack of independence and contemporaneity, I cannot rely upon these notes nor A/Sgt Pullbrook's interview based upon them for the truth of their contents. I have a statutory responsibility to conduct independent investigations and decide whether a police officer probably committed a criminal offence. In this most serious case, I have no informational base I can rely upon. Because I cannot conclude what probably happened, I cannot form reasonable grounds that the subject officer in this matter committed a criminal offence. (Note: quoted at par. 23 (ONSC), par. 20 (ONCA) and par. 18 (SCC))

The families of the deceased suspects initiated an action in the Ontario Superior Court of Justice for a declaration as to the nature of the police duty to cooperate with the SIU's investigations. The officers sought to have the application struck out on grounds of non-justiciability and standing.

== The courts below ==
At first instance, Low J allowed the officers' motion and struck the application, declaring:

[77] The question can be viewed from this perspective: do the applicants have a right to restrain the police officer respondents from the acts said to be unlawful, of or to require them to conduct themselves in a different manner? For example, do the applicants have a legal right to require a police officer not to retain a particular solicitor of his choosing? Do the applicants have a legal right to require a police officer to complete his notebook entries at any particular time and in any particular way? Do the applicants have a legal right to require the lawyer, Mr. McKay, to refuse a retainer? Do the applicants have a legal right to require a police force to report an incident to the SIU within a particular number or minutes or hours? In my view, they do not.

On appeal to the Ontario Court of Appeal, the ruling was set aside. In a unanimous opinion, Sharpe JA held that the application was justiciable, that the families had public interest standing, and that the Court of Appeal had jurisdiction to decide the substantive issues raised in the application without the need to remit the matter to the Superior Court. However, he stated that a declaration could not be granted in the broad terms originally sought:

[79] I would not, however, grant a declaration absolutely precluding any and all consultation with a lawyer prior to the officer making his notes. For the following reasons, I would grant a declaration in terms that are quite similar to the position taken by the Commissioner of the OPP.

[80] First, the Notice of Application asks for a declaration that officers not be permitted to have a lawyer review or vet their notes and that the SIU Regulation does not permit a supervising officer to authorize officers to refrain from preparing their notes until after the expiry of the police officer's shift to permit consultation with counsel. The Notice of Application does not ask for a declaration precluding an officer from any consultation with a lawyer prior to the completion of the officer's notes.

[81] Second, while relief in those terms was addressed during oral argument, I am not persuaded that relief in such broad terms would be justified. There is nothing explicit or implicit in the SIU Regulation that would deny a police officer who finds himself or herself in the stressful situation of having been involved in an incident attracting the attention of the SIU the right to some basic legal advice as to the nature of his or her rights and obligations in connection with the incident and the SIU investigation. The officer is entitled to legal advice on matters such as the following:

- he or she is required to complete notes of the incident prior to the end of his or her tour of duty unless excused by the chief of police;
- the lawyer cannot advise the officer what to include in the notes other than that they should provide a full and honest record of the officer's recollection of the incident in the officer's own words;
- the notes are to be submitted to the chief of police;
- if the officer is a subject officer, the chief of police will not pass the notes on to the SIU;
- if the officer is a witness officer, the chief of police will pass the notes on to the SIU;
- the officer will be required to answer questions from the SIU investigators; the officer will be entitled to consult counsel prior to the SIU interview and to have counsel present during the interview.

The matter was taken to the Supreme Court of Canada:

- The officers appealed, asserting that the Court of Appeal erred in restricting the entitlement to counsel to nothing more than "basic legal advice".
- The SIU Director cross-appealed, arguing that, although the Court of Appeal was correct in holding that officers are not entitled to the assistance of counsel in the preparation of their notes, it erred in concluding that police officers are entitled to "basic legal advice" prior to completing their notes.
- The families and the Commissioner of the Ontario Provincial Police were content with the decision of the Court of Appeal and defended its correctness.

== At the Supreme Court of Canada ==
The SCC unanimously agreed that the appeal should be dismissed, and by 6-3 allowed the cross-appeal. It accordingly issued the declaration sought in these terms:

The Police Services Act, R.S.O. 1990, c. P.15, s. 113(9), and the regulation regarding Conduct and Duties of Police Officers Respecting Investigations by the Special Investigations Unit, O. Reg. 267/10, prohibit subject and witness officers from consulting with counsel until the officers have completed their police notes and filed them with the chief of police.

=== Appeal ===
In his ruling, Moldaver J stated:

- The right to counsel arose under s. 7(1) of the Regulation, which is distinct from the s. 10(b) right to counsel under the Canadian Charter of Rights and Freedoms. As interveners, the Canadian Civil Liberties Association and the Canadian Police Association tried to argue that the Charter right had been triggered, but these pleadings were struck out as the main parties had not raised that issue.
- The officers argued that, no matter how s. 7(1) is interpreted, they were free at common law to consult with counsel in the preparation of their notes. The SCC disagreed, as the case dealt with officers not as ordinary citizens, but in their professional capacity as subjects in a SIU investigation, and the regulation comprehensively sets out all the rights and duties in the matter.
- The s. 7(1) right to counsel must be read restrictively, in order not to interfere with the officers' duty under s. 9 to take notes, (Note: In a footnote, Moldaver J points to several rulings of the Canadian courts holding that such a duty already existed, eg R. v. Bailey, 2005 ABPC 61 at par. 42 (8 June 2005), R. v. Stewart, 2012 ONCJ 298 at par. 28 (15 May 2012), and R. v. Vu, 2013 SCC 60 at par. 70 (7 November 2013)) thus giving a harmonious interpretation to the regulatory scheme.

=== Cross-appeal ===
In dismissing the cross-appeal, Moldaver J held that even the perfunctory consultation contemplated by the Court of Appeal was liable to cause an "appearances problem," while LeBel and Cromwell JJ felt that the Court of Appeal was essentially correct in determining how and when the right to consult with counsel should not be exercised.

== Impact ==
The SIU and the families welcomed it, but police unions such as the Ontario Provincial Police Association claimed that police officers now have less protection than the rest of Canada.

There also continues to be controversy as to the lack of support given to the SIU by the provincial government in pursuing its role in this case and others, which has attracted criticism from the Ontario Ombudsman.
