= Reference Re Supreme Court Act, ss 5 and 6 =

Canadian constitutional law case – SCC

Reference Re Supreme Court Act, ss. 5 and 6
- Supreme Court of Canada

Hearing: 15 January 2014 Judgment: 21 March 2014
- Full case name: In the Matter of a Reference by the Governor in Council concerning sections 5 and 6 of the Supreme Court Act, R.S.C. 1985, c. S-26, as set out in Order in Council P.C. 2013-1105 dated October 22, 2013
- Citations: 2014 SCC 21 (LEXUM), 2014 SCC 21 (CanLII)
- Docket No.: 35586

Holding
- Only current members of the superior courts of Quebec or current members of the Bar of Quebec with at least ten years' standing may be appointed to the Quebec seats on the Supreme Court. An amendment to the Supreme Court Act to permit appointments of former members of the Bar of Quebec is unconstitutional.

Court membership
- Chief Justice: Beverley McLachlin; Puisne Justices: Louis LeBel, Rosalie Abella, Marshall Rothstein, Thomas Cromwell, Michael Moldaver, Andromache Karakatsanis, Richard Wagner

Reasons given
- Majority: McLachlin, LeBel, Abella, Cromwell, Karakatsanis and Wagner
- Dissent: Moldaver
- Rothstein took no part in the consideration or decision of the case.

Laws applied
- Supreme Court Act, ss. 5 and 6

Reference Re Supreme Court Act, ss. 5 and 6 [2014] 1 S.C.R. 433, 2014 SCC 21 is a decision of the Supreme Court of Canada concerning the eligibility of members of the Quebec courts and the Quebec Bar to be appointed to the three seats on the Supreme Court reserved for Quebec. The case also considers the constitutional status of the Supreme Court, holding that the Court has been constitutionally entrenched by the Constitution Act, 1982, and that the composition of the Court, including eligibility for appointment, can only be amended by unanimous consent of the House of Commons, Senate and all provincial legislative assemblies.

== Background ==
The case arose when the federal government appointed Justice Marc Nadon to the position of puisne justice of the Supreme Court of Canada, on October 3, 2013. At the time of the appointment, Justice Nadon was a supernumerary judge of the Federal Court of Appeal, having served on the federal courts for over 20 years. Justice Nadon had been a member of the Quebec Bar prior to his appointment.

Ontario lawyer Rocco Galati challenged the appointment in the Federal Court of Canada, arguing that Justice Nadon was not eligible to be appointed, as he was neither a member of one of the superior courts of Quebec, nor a current member of the Bar of Quebec. The Quebec government also questioned the appointment.

In response, the federal Parliament passed an amendment to the Supreme Court Act, which declared that the requirement that an appointee be a member of the Quebec bar also included former members of the Bar. The federal government then referred the issue to the Supreme Court as a reference question under the Supreme Court Act. The federal government argued that the requirement that Quebec judges be appointed from among the bar of Quebec included former members of the bar.

== The Supreme Court Act and the Quebec seats on the court ==
When the Supreme Court was created in 1875, it was composed of six judges, two of whom were required to be appointed from the superior courts of Quebec or from the Bar of Quebec, in order to ensure representation of Quebec's civil law jurisdiction on the Court. When the Court was expanded to nine judges in 1949, the number of Quebec judges was increased to three. This provision continues to apply under the Supreme Court Act.

Section 5 of the Act holds that, in general, Court appointees must either have been members of a provincial superior court, or must have at least ten years' standing at a provincial bar. Section 6 then provides a particular rule for Quebec, requiring that the three judges from Quebec must be appointed from either the superior courts of Quebec, or "among the advocates of that province." The general rule in section 5 clearly included former members of the bars of the provinces as eligible to be appointed. The issue was whether the wording of section 6 restricted that general rule to current members of the bar of Quebec for the Quebec seats on the Court.

== Decision of the Court ==
The Supreme Court ruled, by a 6–1 decision, that only current members of the Quebec superior courts and current members of the bar of Quebec are eligible to be appointed to the Quebec seats on the Supreme Court.

=== Majority decision ===
The majority decision was attributed to all six of the judges in the majority, rather than to a single judge. The Court held that the amendment to the Supreme Court Act was not simply declaratory of the previous law but an actual change to the composition of the Court, and was therefore ultra vires federal Parliament. A change to the composition of the Court can only be made by a unanimous constitutional amendment under s. 41 of the Constitution Act, 1982. The appointment of Justice Nadon was therefore void ab initio. He remained a supernumerary judge of the Federal Court of Appeal.

=== Dissent by Justice Moldaver ===
Justice Moldaver dissented. He argued that section 5 and section 6 of the Supreme Court Act had to be read together, and that the requirement in section 6 that Quebec appointees be from "among the advocates of that province" included former members of the Quebec bar, the same as for appointments from the other provinces under section 5.

=== Recusal by Justice Rothstein ===
Justice Rothstein did not participate in the decision. He had been appointed from the Federal Court of Appeal, leading to the possibility that his right to be appointed might be called into question. However, since he had previously been a member of the bar of Manitoba, the decision did not leave his appointment in doubt, since he qualified under the general appointee principle set out in section 5 of the Supreme Court Act.

== See also ==
- List of Supreme Court of Canada cases (McLachlin Court)
