= Ernst v Alberta Energy Regulator =

- Supreme Court of Canada

Hearing: 12 January 2016 Judgment: 13 January 2017
- Citations: 2017 SCC 1
- Prior history: APPEAL from Ernst v Alberta (Energy Resources Conservation Board), 2014 ABCA 285 (15 September 2014), affirming Ernst v EnCana Corporation, 2013 ABQB 537 (16 September 2013)
- Ruling: Appeal dismissed.

Holding
- Ernst erred when she failed to exercise a petition for judicial review into the conduct of the Regulator.

Court membership
- Chief Justice: Beverley McLachlin; Puisne Justices: Rosalie Abella, Thomas Cromwell, Michael Moldaver, Andromache Karakatsanis, Richard Wagner, Clément Gascon, Suzanne Côté, Russell Brown

Reasons given
- Majority: Cromwell J, joined by Karakatsanis, Wagner and Gascon JJ
- Concurrence: Abella
- Dissent: McLachlin CJ, Moldaver and Brown JJ, joined by Côté J

Ernst v Alberta Energy Regulator was a 2017 decision of the Supreme Court of Canada dealing with the extent to which damages are available as a remedy under the Canadian Charter of Rights and Freedoms.

== Background ==
This case pitted Jessica Ernst, an Alberta homeowner, against the Energy Resources Conservation Board (ERCB), who had ceased all forms of communication with her because her offhand remark in an electronic forum referred to Wiebo Ludwig had caused the regulator fear and anxiety over her purported terrorist sympathies. She claimed that her Charter rights to free speech had been abrogated by it, as it refused subsequently to hear her petitions in a dispute over her well-water, which she maintained had been polluted by the fracking activities of EnCana.

In 2007, Ernst sued the Alberta government, EnCana Corporation and the ERCB, (Note: since replaced by the Alberta Energy Regulator established under the Responsible Energy Development Act, S.A. 2012, c. R-17.3) for alleged negligence over the contamination of local aquifers during a period of intense and shallow fracking of coal seams near her home in Rosebud, Alberta. It was reported that, between 2003 and 2008, more than 100 Alberta landowners lost or reported damage to their water wells as a result of such activity.

During discussions with the ERCB as early as 2005, the Board identified her as a security threat, and refused any communication with her until she ceased criticizing its actions in public. As a result, she amended her statement of claim to include damages from the ERCB for violating her Charter rights under s. 2(b) thereof.

The ERCB and the Province sought to have certain paragraphs of the claim struck off or, in the alternative, better particulars with respect to such paragraphs. The Board also sought a further alternative of having summary judgment granted in its favour.

== The courts below ==
The Court of Queen's Bench of Alberta ruled that:

1. Ernst's claims against the ERCB in negligence were struck;
2. Ernst's Charter claim was valid, subject to the Limitations Act and the Energy Resources Conservation Act; but such claims were barred in any case under the latter Act; (Note: the relevant provision has since become s. 27 of the Responsible Energy Development Act)
3. Alberta's application was dismissed.

The Court of Appeal of Alberta dismissed Ernst's appeal, declaring that the lower court's ruling "discloses no reviewable error."

== At the Supreme Court ==
By 5-4, the appeal was dismissed with costs, although for different reasons than were expressed by the Alberta courts.

Cromwell J held that, as Ernst had not successfully challenged the constitutionality of the immunity clause protecting the ERCB, the appeal must fail. However, the constitutional challenge still needed to be considered on its merits:

1. If an immunity provision clearly purports to bar a damages claim, and if the record before the Court is not adequate to permit a decision on its constitutionality, then the immunity clause must be applied.
2. Charter damages could never be an appropriate and just remedy for such breaches by the Board, so the immunity clause cannot be unconstitutional. Vancouver (City) v Ward was endorsed, as "Charter damages will not be an appropriate and just remedy where there is an effective alternative remedy or where damages would be contrary to the demands of good governance."
3. Judicial review would "provide vindication in a much more timely manner than an action for damages", and "there is a wide range of remedies available through judicial review for Charter breaches by quasi-judicial and regulatory boards".
4. The Board owed Ernst no duty of care under the private law of negligence, "for reasons of insufficient proximity or countervailing policy considerations, or both". In addition, "Opening the Board to damages claims will distract it from its statutory duties, potentially have a chilling effect on its decision making, compromise its impartiality, and open up new and undesirable modes of collateral attack on its decisions."

Abella J was more succinct in explaining why Ernst's claim must fail:

Ms. Ernst’s argument that she was not seeking to challenge the validity of s. 43, only its applicability to a Charter damages claim, is unsustainable. The immunity clause either complies with the Charter or it does not. But either way, there must be a judicial determination of the constitutional validity, and therefore the constitutional applicability, of the provision. Ms. Ernst’s argument that the immunity clause does not apply when a Charter remedy is being sought, is an argument that there is no need to go through the necessary steps to determine whether a provision is Charter-compliant in order to disregard it. This invokes Alice in Wonderland.

Since Ms. Ernst did not seek to challenge the constitutionality of in the prior proceedings, there is no record either to justify or impugn the provision. This means that for the time being, the provision’s constitutionality is intact, which means that the Board’s immunity is intact, which means that Ms. Ernst cannot, under these circumstances, legally sustain a claim that the Board is vulnerable to a damages claim, either under the Charter or otherwise. As a result, I agree with the Alberta courts that Ms. Ernst’s claim ought to be struck.

...

Ms. Ernst had the opportunity to seek timely judicial review of the Board’s decision. She chose not to. Instead, she attempted to frame her grievance as a claim for Charter damages. That is precisely why exists—to prevent an end-run by litigants around the required process, resulting in undue expense and delay for the Board and for the public.

McLachlin CJ, in a joint dissent with Moldave and Brown JJ, would have allowed the appeal, returning the case to the Alberta courts to decide upon the issues relating to free speech and Charter remedies, because:

1. It was not plain and obvious that Charter damages could not be an appropriate and just remedy.
2. It was not plain and obvious that the immunity clause applied to Ernst's claim.
3. Therefore, it was unnecessary to answer the constitutional question as to the validity of the immunity clause in the case of a Charter breach.
