= R v Nur =

- Supreme Court of Canada

Hearing: 7 November 2014 Judgment: 14 April 2015
- Full case name: Her Majesty the Queen v Hussein Jama Nur and Attorney General of Canada v Hussein Jama Nur
- Citations: 2015 SCC 15
- Docket No.: 35678, 35684
- Prior history: Appeal from R v Nur, 2013 ONCA 677 (25 November 2013)
- Ruling: Appeals dismissed.

Holding
- The Criminal Code's imposition of mandatory minimum sentences for the section 95(1) firearm possession offence contravenes section 12 of the Charter and is not saved by section 1.

Court membership
- Chief Justice: Beverley McLachlin; Puisne Justices: Rosalie Abella, Marshall Rothstein, Thomas Cromwell, Michael Moldaver, Andromache Karakatsanis, Richard Wagner, Clément Gascon

Reasons given
- Majority: McLachlin CJ, joined by LeBel, Abella, Cromwell, Karakatsanis and Gascon JJ
- Dissent: Moldaver J, joined by Rothstein and Wagner JJ

R v Nuir [2015] S.C.R., 2015 SCC 15 is a Canadian constitutional law case concerning the constitutionality of mandatory minimum sentences for firearm offences in Canada.

== Background ==
In 2008, the Conservative government introduced the Tackling Violent Crime Act, a bill that amended the Criminal Code by adding mandatory minimum sentences for those found guilty of various firearm offences. The bill received royal assent and mandatory minimum sentences were attached to section 95(1) of the Criminal Code, a hybrid offence which prohibited possession of a loaded prohibited firearm, or possession of an unloaded prohibited firearm alongside ammunition. If the Crown elected to proceed by summary conviction, the mandatory minimum sentence was one year under section 95(2)(b) of the Criminal Code. Indictable offences were punishable by a mandatory minimum sentence of three years under section 95(2)(a)(i) of the Criminal Code.

=== Hussein Jama Nur ===
In January 2009, Toronto police officers were called to a Jane-Finch community centre after receiving a report that a threatening person was waiting outside the centre. When an officer arrived, the respondent Hussein Jama Nur, a 19-year-old high school student, ran away from the community centre, and the officer gave chase. During the pursuit, Nur threw a loaded semiautomatic handgun away from his person. Nur was promptly arrested and the gun recovered. He was charged under section 95(1) of the Criminal Code.

In 2011, Nur was tried at the Ontario Superior Court of Justice. The Crown elected to try the case as an indictable offence, and Nur pleaded guilty, arguing only that the mandatory minimum sentence was unconstitutional, violating section 12 because it could capture certain behaviours falling short of criminal conduct, and section 15 of the Charter. The trial judge found that the section 95(2)(a)(i) mandatory minimum sentence was not unconstitutional. Although he held that the difference in sentences arising from summary and indictable proceedings was unconstitutional, it was not found to offer a defence to Nur. Nur was sentenced to one day in prison, since he had already served 26 months in custody, which was credited as double time.

Nur appealed to the Ontario Court of Appeal in 2013. The court allowed his appeal, holding that the section 95(2)(a)(i) three-year mandatory minimum sentence for firearm offences was unconstitutional. Doherty JA, writing for the court, found that the mandatory minimum sentence was a “cavernous disconnect” that violated the section 12 Charter prohibition on cruel or unusual treatment or punishment and that could not be saved by section 1 of the Charter under an Oakes analysis. However, Doherty JA allowed the three-year mandatory minimum sentence to stand for certain “true crime[s]”. Doherty JA upheld Nur's sentence.

=== Sidney Charles ===
In May 2008, Toronto police searched respondent Sidney Charles’ apartment during an unrelated incident. The police uncovered an unregistered semi-automatic handgun and prohibited over-capacity ammunition magazine in Charles’ room. Charles was arrested and charged under section 95(1) of the Criminal Code and under several other firearm-related provisions. Since Charles had previously been convicted of two firearm-related offences, the offence was punishable by a mandatory minimum sentence of five years under section 95(2)(a)(ii) of the Criminal Code.

Charles was tried before the Ontario Superior Court of Justice by indictment in 2010. At trial, Charles argued that the five-year mandatory minimum sentence was unconstitutional, violating sections 7, 9 and 12 of the Charter. The trial judge rejected this argument, holding that the sentence was not grossly disproportionate, and sentenced Charles to two years of imprisonment on the basis of his pre-trial custody.

Charles appealed to the Ontario Court of Appeal, where his case was heard alongside Nur's. Cronk JA, writing for the court, found that the mandatory minimum five-year sentence was unconstitutional, as it was grossly disproportionate when compared to a reasonable hypothetical. The court nonetheless upheld the trial judge's sentence.

== Judgment of the SCC ==
The Crown appealed both decisions of the Ontario Court of Appeal to the Supreme Court of Canada; the Court heard both concurrently. All nine judges of the Court agreed that Nur's and Charles’ sentences were appropriate. However, they disagreed as to the constitutionality of the Criminal Code provisions.

=== Majority ===
The majority of the Supreme Court, led by Chief Justice McLachlin, dismissed the Crown's appeal. McLachlin CJ emphasized the need to tailor criminal sentences to the seriousness of the situation, the offender's blameworthiness and the harm resulting from the offence, and noted that mandatory minimum sentences function as a "blunt instrument” that complicate proportionality in sentencing. According to McLachlin J, the deterrent effect of a mandatory minimum sentence would not alone “sanitize” a sentence, per R v Morrisey.

Further, McLachlin CJ held that courts may consider “reasonably foreseeable” hypothetical situations when conducting a section 12 Charter analysis, for two reasons:

1. past jurisprudence has not confined Charter challenges to situations where the claimant's own rights have been violated; and
2. section 12 cases R v Morissey, R v Smith and R v Goltz indicate the importance of considering “situation[s] that may reasonably be expected to arise”.

McLachlin CJ rejected the argument that such hypotheticals would amount to an overbroad conferral of discretion on courts, writing instead that the question is one of statutory interpretation, “grounded in experience and common sense”.

McLachlin CJ set the threshold required to find reasonable foreseeability at “circumstances that are foreseeably captured by the minimum conduct caught by the offence”, a standard which would exclude only “remote” or “far-fetched” hypotheticals. McLachlin CJ dismissed the Attorney General of Ontario's argument that only a higher likelihood standard to find gross disproportionality would offer certainty. Instead, McLachlin CJ found that the principle of stare decisis would make it unnecessary for courts to “duplicate the analysis” in every new section 12 case. Reported cases may also be considered by the court, and the court may consider the offender's relevant personal characteristics, but not those that would artificially generate a “remote” or “far-fetched” situation.

In summary, McLachlin CJ noted:

[77] … when a mandatory minimum sentencing provision is challenged, two questions arise. The first is whether the provision results in a grossly disproportionate sentence on the individual before the court. If the answer is no, the second question is whether the provision’s reasonably foreseeable applications will impose grossly disproportionate sentences on others. This is consistent with the settled jurisprudence on constitutional review and rules of constitutional interpretation, which seek to determine the potential reach of a law; is workable; and provides sufficient certainty.

McLachlin CJ applied the section 12 test to section 95(2)(a)(i) of the Criminal Code, writing that section 95(1)’s prohibition on possession covers a broad spectrum of conduct, and that it could capture with reasonable foreseeability certain licensing offences or other conduct “involving little or no moral fault and little or no danger to the public” that would result in a grossly disproportionate sentence. McLachlin CJ rejected the Attorney General's argument that the Crown could avoid the issue by proceeding by summary judgment, for four reasons:

1. this approach would effectively delegate the courts’ constitutional sentencing obligation to the state;
2. it would insulate the Crown's decisions from any “meaningful review’’;
3. it would imbalance criminal proceedings by offering prosecutors a “trump card” in plea bargains; and
4. the Crown's decision would be made before disclosure of all the available facts.

McLachlin CJ held that parole eligibility is not a factor in determining the gross disproportionality of a mandatory minimum sentence. McLachlin CJ held also that section 95(2)(a)(ii) could disproportionately capture licensing situations.

Having found that the provisions violated section 12 of the Charter, McLachlin CJ did not consider a section 7 Charter argument, instead moving to a section 1 analysis. McLachlin CJ found a rational connection between the mandatory minimum sentences and Parliament's objectives, but held that there were “less harmful means of achieving the legislative goal”, including by adding elements to section 95(1) that would restrict the provision to cases of criminal or dangerous conduct. As such, McLachlin CJ held that the violations of section 12 of the Charter were not saved by section 1.

=== Minority ===
Moldaver J wrote the dissenting reasons, arguing that the mandatory minimum sentencing provisions do not violate section 12 of the Charter. Moldaver J suggested that McLachlin CJ's hypothetical examples of innocent licensing behaviour caught by section 95(1) “stretche[d] the bounds of credulity” and were not reflected in the case law or in common sense, since Parliament intended to craft section 95(1) as a hybrid offence that would allow Crown prosecutors significant discretion when electing to proceed by summary judgment or by indictment. Per Moldaver J, the fact that section 95(1) is a hybrid offence acts as a "safety valve" protecting against grossly disproportionate sentences. Moldaver J pointed to the importance of deterring and denouncing gun crime, building on the Court's pronouncement in R v Felawka that “the firearm itself presents the ultimate threat of death to those in its presence”, and appellate court jurisprudence indicating that the mere act of possession is “inherently dangerous”.

Moldaver J rejected the majority's suggestion to add new elements to section 95(1), arguing that an element of criminal intent would be too high a threshold. As an example, Moldaver J considered a hypothetical driver suspected of gang-related activity possessing an unlicensed handgun in the back seat. Moldaver J argued that the majority's proposed modifications to section 95(1) would make it too difficult to prove a specific risk of harm.

Moldaver J rejected the majority's reasonable hypothetical test, and instead suggested a new section 12 Charter analysis framework when considering hybrid offences like those contemplated in section 95(1) of the Criminal Code:

[157] … First, the court must determine whether the scheme adequately protects against grossly disproportionate sentences in general. Second, the court must determine whether the Crown has exercised its discretion in a manner that results in a grossly disproportionate sentence for the particular offender before the court.

Under Moldaver J's test, courts would determine the spectrum of sentences for indictable offences that existed before the introduction of the mandatory minimum sentence, and compare the mandatory minimum to the “low end” of the identified spectrum. Next, courts would determine whether the Crown's election would lead to a grossly disproportionate sentence, for which the accused would have a section 24(1) Charter remedy. Moldaver J argued that this approach would be consistent with the Court's abuse of process jurisprudence, and could be made out through both prosecutorial misconduct and “circumstances… where the integrity of the justice system is implicated”. This would alleviate the majority's concern regarding situations where the Crown used the threat of mandatory minimum sentencing as leverage in plea bargaining. Moldaver J also argued that it would not “[insulate] mandatory minimums from Charter scrutiny”, as the majority feared, since the courts would retain ultimately authority to find a law unconstitutional or a sentence grossly disproportionate. Moldaver J also suggested that Crown prosecutors could elect to stay an indictment proceeding if they discovered fresh facts that would render their election inappropriate.

Applying his framework to the case at hand, Moldaver J found that neither Nur's nor Charles’ sentence under section 95(2) of the Criminal Code was grossly disproportionate. As for a section 7 Charter analysis, Moldaver J rejected Nur's argument that the gap between the length of mandatory minimum sentences for summary and indictable offences was unconstitutional, finding that the increased sentence for indictable offences reflected Parliament's valid legislative goal of denouncing and deterring gun crime. Moldaver J equally rejected Charles’ argument that the inclusion of less serious firearms offences as prior offences for the purpose of section 95(2)(a)(ii) is arbitrary and overbroad. Instead, Moldaver J argued that such concerns were solely founded on hypothetical arguments and that the prior offences captured under section 95(2)(a)(ii) were sufficiently serious in nature.

== Impact ==
Reaction to the Supreme Court's decision in R v Nur was mixed. The Globe and Mail editorial board suggested that “Justice Moldaver got it right”, arguing that the Criminal Code provisions at issue “send a clear message that illegal possession of firearms is a serious criminal offence, deserving serious punishment”, and that the majority's hypothetical licensing example was “imagine[d]". National Post columnist John Ivison characterized the decision as judicial activism and suggested that the Court was "lurching from one erratic decision to another".

On the other hand, law blog The Court preferred the majority's test, writing that “the impotency of judges to configure a sentence that is unique to each offender… open[s] up a greater potential for failure of mandatory minimum sentences to be consistently proportionate to an offence.” The Canadian Broadcasting Corporation referred to the case as the latest in a "legal losing streak" for the Conservative government.

Justice Minister Peter MacKay criticized the Supreme Court's decision to employ a "far-fetched hypothetical scenario" to invalidate the law. Liberal Party leader Justin Trudeau was quoted as saying that mandatory minimum sentences do not "necessarily [keep] us that much safer and also [waste] large amount of taxpayers dollars".

== See also ==
- List of Supreme Court of Canada cases (McLachlin Court)
