= Michael Moldaver =

Canadian judge (born 1947)

The Honourable Michael J. Moldaver CC KC

Puisne Justice of the Supreme Court of Canada
- In office October 21, 2011 – September 1, 2022
- Nominated by: Stephen Harper
- Preceded by: Ian Binnie/Louise Charron
- Succeeded by: Michelle O'Bonsawin

Personal details
- Born: December 23, 1947 (age 78) Peterborough, Ontario
- Education: University of Toronto (BA, LLB)
- Occupation: Jurist
- Profession: Lawyer

Michael James Moldaver (born December 23, 1947) is a former Canadian judge. He was a puisne justice on the Supreme Court of Canada from his 2011 appointment by former Prime Minister Stephen Harper until his retirement in 2022. Before his elevation to the nation's top court, he served as a judge at the Ontario Superior Court of Justice and then the Court of Appeal for Ontario for over 20 years. A former criminal lawyer, Moldaver is considered an expert in both Canadian criminal law and the Canadian Charter of Rights and Freedoms.

== Early life and education ==
Moldaver was born on December 23, 1947, in Peterborough, Ontario. He is the youngest son of Irving Moldaver and Ruth Moldaver (née Black), his family had 3 three sons before him. Moldaver's father, Irving, was a Russian-Jewish émigré to Peterborough who worked as a scrap metal dealer; Ruth Moldaver's family ran a clothing store. Moldaver's maternal grandfather was also Peterborough's first rabbi.

As his parents did not have the opportunity to receive a formal education, they stressed the importance of their sons receiving higher education. Moldaver attended elementary school at Queen Mary Public School and high school at Peterborough Collegiate. Upon graduating, he enrolled at the University of Toronto, receiving a Bachelor of Arts in 1968. From there, he decided to pursue a Bachelor of Laws and enrolled at the school's Faculty of Law. Moldaver struggled in his first semester of law school and failed his December exams. Moldaver recovered and upon his graduation in 1971, was named his graduating year's gold medalist, an award given to the student with the highest academic average.

== Career as a lawyer ==
Upon graduating from law school, Moldaver began articling in Toronto at Thomson Rogers. At that time, his mind was set on finishing his articles and then returning to Peterborough to practice with his brother. However, Moldaver's plans changed with the opportunity to finish the last six months of his articles with a leading criminal defence lawyer, Goldwyn Arthur Martin. Due to his experience with Martin, he decided to remain in Toronto and pursue his career as a criminal lawyer. Moldaver was called to the Ontario Bar in 1973.

Moldaver always wanted to pursue criminal law, as he enjoyed his criminal law classes in law school. In addition, he also admired the television show Perry Mason, which was based on a fictional charismatic criminal defence lawyer. Moldaver stated that the thought of "being able to defend a person charged with murder, who was innocent, and have the real culprit confess after a blistering cross-examination was too much for [him] to resist". His passion for criminal law crystallized during his time with Martin, whom he later described as the "Dean of criminal law in Canada".

Following his articles, Moldaver began his career as a criminal practitioner at the law firm of Pomerant, Pomerant and Greenspan and became a partner in 1975. He had the opportunity to work with Justice Marc Rosenberg, and notable lawyers Eddie Greenspan and Alan Gold. He gained a wealth of experience in short time, as he was given the opportunity to work on murder files in his first year. As he continued to develop and progress into becoming a successful lawyer, he tried to stay true to his personal motto: "Don't go to trial unless you absolutely have to, but if you do go to trial – make your mark."

After being named Queen's Counsel in 1985, he left the firm to begin practising as a sole practitioner. After two years, he joined Goodman and Goodman, where he spent the rest of his practising career.

Throughout his career, Moldaver has appeared in front of courts at every level, including the Ontario Superior Court of Justice and the Court of Appeal for Ontario. As a lawyer, his only appearance in the Supreme Court of Canada was to make an application for leave to appeal a case to the Court. Following that application, he told his firm he was "never going back to that place".

Some of the most frequently cited cases in which he was counsel include:

- R v Schell
- R v Torbiak
- R v Laverty
- PSI Mind Development Institute Ltd. v R
- R v Boyd
- R v Ramdass
- R v MAZ

== Ontario judge ==
In 1990, at age 42, Moldaver was appointed to the High Court of Justice of the Supreme Court of Ontario (now known as the Ontario Superior Court of Justice). He spent five years there before being elevated to the Court of Appeal for Ontario in 1995. Moldaver sat on the Court of Appeal for the next 16 years before his eventual appointment to the Supreme Court of Canada. While at the Court of Appeal, Moldaver was known as one of the Court's most outspoken members and was considered an expert on criminal law. In a series of controversial speeches, he complained that criminal defence lawyers would sometimes "trivialize" the Canadian Charter of Rights and Freedoms out of monetary self-interest by arguing for unnecessary rights claims.

During his time at the Court of Appeal, Moldaver was involved in the acquittal of two longstanding murder convictions. Led by Innocence Canada, Steven Truscott's case was brought before the Court in 2006. In 2007, Moldaver joined the court in acquitting Truscott of his 1959 rape and murder convictions, due to new medical evidence and fresh testimony. During the trial, Moldaver was critical of the investigating team, questioning them as to why they never considered a sexual psychopath as a suspect.

Did the thought ever cross your mind that, for someone to strangle her then sexually assault her, you might want to be looking for someone who is more of a pervert, more of a sexual psychopath?

In 2009, Moldaver wrote the majority decision which acquitted Roméo Phillion of his 1972 murder conviction. Moldaver ultimately decided to overturn the conviction due to the Crown's failure to disclose a key piece of evidence. Moldaver held the missing evidence would have been "gold" in the defence lawyer's hands and that there was overwhelming support for the claim the evidence had not been properly disclosed.

In 2011, Moldaver, along with a unanimous court, sentenced Momin Khawaja to life in prison for engaging in terrorist activity. The Court held that harsh sentences are required to deter individuals from engaging in future terrorist activity.

When terrorists acting on Canadian soil are apprehended and brought to justice, the responsibility lies with the courts to send a clear and unmistakable message that terrorism is reprehensible and those who choose to engage in it here will pay a very heavy price.

— Court of Appeal for Ontario, R v Khawaja, 2010 ONCA 862 at para 246

== Supreme Court of Canada ==
=== Appointment ===
On October 17, 2011, Moldaver, along with fellow Court of Appeal for Ontario judge Andromache Karakatsanis, was nominated to the Supreme Court of Canada by then-Prime Minister Stephen Harper. His nomination and eventual appointment filled one of the two vacancies left by retiring Justices Ian Binnie and Louise Charron. He was formally appointed to the Court on October 21, 2011. Though Moldaver was appointed by a Conservative government, he is not seen as having a strong conservative political ideology but has been described as being mildly conservative, with a dedication to being pragmatic and following the law.

Moldaver's nomination raised some concern, due to his prior statements made about criminal defence lawyers and the Charter. Moldaver has publicly criticised criminal defence lawyers' roles in the growing length of trials. In a series of speeches, Moldaver stated that criminal lawyers have demeaned the Charter by bringing baseless Charter claims as a means to challenge evidence. In his 2005 address to the Criminal Lawyers Association, Moldaver stated that the criminal lawyer who continues to "throw up a medley of Charter issues in the hopes that one or two might stick" should realize "those days are gone".

Many of the Charter issues that you are likely to encounter on a day-to-day basis have been thoroughly litigated, all the way to the Supreme Court. By and large the governing principles are firmly established.

— Michael Moldaver, Long Criminal Trials: Masters of a System They Are Meant to Serve, 32 CR (6th) 316

These comments received pushback from criminal lawyers, who accused Moldaver of interpreting the Charter as a "weed to be stunted" instead of a "vital living tree". In expressing his disapproval with counsel who clog the justice system by bringing baseless Charter claims, he suggested he wants to see changes that will "simplify the criminal law, and in the process, restore the public's faith and confidence in our criminal justice system". Though the majority of his comments have been directed towards defence lawyers, Moldaver has also been critical of Crown counsel. He has questioned whether they overcharge, refuse to yield to reasonable defence requests, and push the evidentiary envelope beyond what is needed for a conviction.

Moldaver's nomination received further criticism for his inability to speak French. Both the Bloc Quebecois and the New Democratic Party expressed their concerns over his lack of French proficiency and claimed they would not support his nomination. The Quebec Bar Association expressed concerns his appointment would deny Francophones equality before the law and was a step backwards because his predecessor – Justice Louise Charron – was bilingual. However, the Conservative Party advocated for Moldaver, noting he was capable of using the translation services offered in the Court. Interim Liberal Party leader Bob Rae suggested it should not be assumed that someone cannot learn French. Moldaver expressed his respect for the French language and apologized for his inability to speak it; he committed himself to becoming more proficient in the future.

=== Notable judgments ===
In his first year on the Supreme Court, Moldaver penned eight majority decisions. He was the only member of the Court to be a part of all 75 majority decisions rendered that year. In the following years, Moldaver has written some notable decisions. In 2013, in R v Mackenzie, Moldaver wrote the majority judgement in the 5–4 decision. In upholding a police search and seizure, he argued that every single police action should not be "placed under a scanning electron-microscope". In 2014, writing for the majority in R v Hart, Moldaver redefined the common law test for the admissibility of confessions obtained through a Mr. Big sting operation. He held that the confessions will only be admissible if they contain probative value and do not cause an abuse of process. In 2015, he wrote the dissenting judgment in the 6–3 decision in R v Nur. He argued that the Court should have shown judicial restraint and upheld Parliament's three-year mandatory minimum sentence for illegal possession of a loaded firearm. Additionally, Moldaver wrote the lone dissent in Reference Re Supreme Court Act, ss 5 and 6, where he supported Stephen Harper's decision to appoint Marc Nadon to the Supreme Court. As of March 2017, Moldaver has written 39 majority judgments and 10 dissents during his time on the Supreme Court.

==== Reference re Supreme Court Act, ss 5 and 6 ====
In Reference Re Supreme Court Act, ss 5 and 6, the Supreme Court was asked to determine the eligibility requirements for members of Quebec Courts and the Quebec Bar to be appointed to one of Quebec's three constitutionally guaranteed seats in the Supreme Court. The reference came before the Court in response to Stephen Harper's appointment of Justice Marc Nadon, a Federal Court of Appeal judge. The appointment was challenged by Rocco Galati and the Quebec government. They argued Nadon was not eligible for appointment under the Supreme Court Act because he was not a current member of a Quebec Superior Court or the Quebec Bar. The Court was asked to determine if a former member of the Quebec Bar satisfied the Supreme Court Act's requirements. By a 6–1 decision, the Court held that only current members of the Quebec Bar or a Quebec Superior Court satisfied the requirements and could validly be appointed. Consequently, Nadon's appointment was quashed.

Moldaver disagreed with the majority and wrote a strong dissent. Under his interpretation of the Supreme Court Act, section 5 and section 6 are sufficiently related and are to be read together.

Section 5 sets out the threshold eligibility requirements to be appointed a judge of this Court. Section 6 guarantees three Quebec seats on the Court by specifying that, for at least three of the judges, the bar mentioned in s. 5 is the Barreau du Québec and the superior courts mentioned in s. 5 are the Superior Court of Quebec and the Quebec Court of Appeal. Put another way, s. 6 builds on s. 5 by requiring that for three of the seats on this Court, the candidates who meet the criteria of s. 5 must be chosen from three Quebec institutions (the Barreau du Québec, the Quebec Court of Appeal, and the Superior Court of Quebec). Section 6 does not impose any additional requirements.

— Michael Moldaver, Reference re Supreme Court Act, ss 5 and 6 at para 119

Section 5 states, "Any person may be appointed a judge who is or has been a judge of a superior court of a province or a barrister or advocate of at least ten years standing at the bar of a province." Moldaver argued that a judge who meets the requirements under section 5, is eligible to be named to one of the three seats available under section 6. As section 5 does not require that the appointee be a current member of a superior court or the bar of a province, Moldaver held that both current and past advocates of at least ten years' standing at the Quebec Bar are eligible for appointment to the Court. As Nadon had previously been a member of the Quebec Bar for more than ten years, Moldaver would have upheld his appointment.

==== R v MacKenzie ====
In R v MacKenzie, the accused, Benjamin Cain MacKenzie, was charged with possession of a controlled drug for the purpose of trafficking. Police pulled MacKenzie over during a highway traffic stop and, through the use of a sniffer-dog, discovered a large amount of marijuana. MacKenzie alleged the dog's sniff violated his section 8 Charter rights against unreasonable search and seizure because the police lacked reasonable suspicion he was involved in a drug related offence.

Moldaver wrote the majority decision in the 5–4 ruling, holding the search was constitutional. He held that police are permitted to use sniffer-dogs to search for drugs and prevent crimes, even in situations where individuals have a reasonable expectation of privacy, provided the police have reasonable grounds to suspect that the search will reveal evidence of a criminal offence.

In sum, while it is critical that the line between a hunch and reasonable suspicion be maintained to prevent the police from engaging in indiscriminate or discriminatory practices, it is equally vital that the police be allowed to carry out their duties without undue scepticism or the requirement that their every move be placed under a scanning electron microscope.

— Michael Moldaver, R v MacKenzie, 2013 SCC 50

He emphasized that the police only require a reasonable suspicion that they will find narcotics and not a reasonable probability of finding them. Moldaver said that to determine whether the threshold has been satisfied, common sense, flexibility and experience must be viewed through the eyes of a reasonable person armed with the knowledge, training and experience of the investigating officer.

==== R v Hart ====
In 2014, writing for a unanimous Court in R v Hart, Moldaver established a new test for determining the admissibility of confessions obtained through a Mr. Big operation – a procedure whereby an undercover officer induces a confession as proof of the accused's loyalty to a criminal organization. In changing the common law test for the admissibility of a confession, Moldaver established a new test. In order for a confession to be admissible, Moldaver held that the probative value must outweigh the prejudicial effect.

Where the state recruits an accused into a fictitious criminal organization of its own making and seeks to elicit a confession from him, any confession made by the accused to the state during the operation should be treated as presumptively inadmissible. This presumption of inadmissibility is overcome where the Crown can establish, on a balance of probabilities, that the probative value of the confession outweighs its prejudicial effect.

— Michael Moldaver, R v Hart, 2014 SCC 52 at para 85

Moldaver expanded this test to protect an accused, by allowing confessions to be admissible only if the accused would not be subject to an abuse of process. He held that "misconduct that offends the community’s sense of fair play and decency will amount to an abuse of process and warrant the exclusion of the statement."

==== R v Nur ====
In 2015, the Court was asked to determine whether the mandatory minimum sentences of three and five years for the possession of a loaded prohibited firearm – contrary to section 95(1) of the Canadian Criminal Code – violated section 12 of the Charter for being cruel and unusual punishment. Writing for a 6–3 majority, Chief Justice McLachlin stated that criminal punishments need to reflect the seriousness of the crime. As a result, the Court held that the mandatory minimums are inconsistent with section 12 of the Charter and are therefore declared of no force of effect under section 52 of the Constitution Act, 1982.

Dissenting, Moldaver held that the mandatory minimum sentencing provisions do not violate section 12 of the Charter. He argued that the illegal firearm possession provisions are hybrid offences and therefore only carry the mandatory minimum sentence if the Crown proceeds by indictment, instead of by summary conviction. He stated that the nature of the hybrid offence acts a "safety valve", which ensures that the least serious offenders will not face three years in prison. Therefore, Moldaver argued the focus should be on the constitutionality of the Crown's election to proceed by indictment rather than summarily, not the law itself.

… First, the court must determine whether the scheme adequately protects against grossly disproportionate sentences in general. Second, the court must determine whether the Crown has exercised its discretion in a manner that results in a grossly disproportionate sentence for the particular offender before the court.

— Michael Moldaver, R v Nur, 2015 SCC 15 at para 157

He concluded that an accused party will not be unjustly punished, based solely on the Crown's election, because if the Crown proceeds improperly and it leads to a "grossly disproportionate" sentence, there are remedies for an accused under section 24(1) of the Charter.

=== Retirement ===
Michael Moldaver's final sitting day on the Supreme Court was May 19, 2022. His retirement was effective September 1, 2022.

== Involvement within the legal community ==
Moldaver has maintained an active role within the legal community. During his career as a trial lawyer, he was a one-time co-chair of the Canadian Bar Association, a director of the Criminal Lawyers' Association and the Advocates' Society, and a co-chair of the University of Toronto Academic Tribunal, Discipline Subsection. In addition, he co-chaired the 1989 and 1990 Advocacy Symposiums.

Throughout his professional life, Moldaver has contributed to legal education. From 1975 to 1995, he taught criminal law classes at Osgoode Hall Law School and the University of Toronto. Though he no longer teaches at either university, he continues to sponsor awards at the University of Toronto. Moldaver has volunteered as a guest judge on final panels for various national law school moot competitions. Amongst others, he sat on the final panel of the 2014 Wilson Moot and the 2016 Davies Corporate/Securities Moot.

Apart from post-secondary education, Moldaver has contributed to continuing legal education programs for lawyers and the judiciary. He has frequently taught and spoken at numerous educational programs. Some of which include programs sponsored by the National Judicial Institute, the Canadian Institute for the Administration of Justice, the Ontario Crown Attorneys' Association, Criminal Lawyers' Association and Ontario Bar Association.

== Personal life ==
Moldaver has been married several times. He is currently married to Rivka Moldaver, ex-wife of Alan Young. He has two daughters, Shannon and Jessica, and two grandchildren.

He was made a Companion of the Order of Canada on December 31, 2025.

== See also ==
- Reasons of the Supreme Court of Canada by Justice Moldaver
