= Administrative monetary penalty =

An administrative monetary penalty (AMP) is a civil penalty imposed by a regulator for a contravention of an act, regulation or by-law. It is issued upon discovery of an unlawful event, and is due and payable subject only to any rights of review that may be available under the AMP's implementing scheme. It is regulatory in nature, rather than criminal, and is intended to secure compliance with a regulatory scheme, and it can be employed with the use of other administrative sanctions, such as demerit points and license suspensions.

== Nature ==
AMPs differ from ordinary fines, such as those for parking tickets, in that, under the relevant legislation:

1. the AMP applies to a narrower segment of the general population (for example, a regulated industry);
2. imposing an AMP involves a number of steps, for instance, the person may first be given a warning and/or an opportunity to address the statutory decision-maker's concerns (that is, to comply with the scheme);
3. the decision to impose an AMP is made by a senior official such as a Director or a person designated by that Director;
4. the criteria to guide the determination whether to impose and how to set the amount of an AMP is set out;
5. within those criteria, the person empowered to levy the penalty may be given significant discretion to decide whether to impose an AMP and to determine the appropriate amount of the AMP; and
6. the reconsideration or review/appeal of an AMP by the statutory decision-maker and/or an independent, specialized tribunal is allowed.

== AMPs by jurisdiction ==
=== United Kingdom ===
Legislation enabling general schemes of fixed and variable monetary penalties— in addition to other sanctions— has been introduced through Part 3 of the Regulatory Enforcement and Sanctions Act 2008.

Under the Road Traffic Act 1991— and subsequently expanded under part 6 of the Traffic Management Act 2004— AMPs known as "penalty charge notices" have replaced fixed penalty notices where local authorities have adopted schemes of decriminalised parking enforcement. In some areas such as London, the challenge process for PCNs can be completed online, via the Internet.

=== Canada ===
In Guindon v Canada, the Supreme Court of Canada ruled that AMPs are generally considered to be administrative in nature and thus not subject to the legal protections provided under s.11 of the Canadian Charter of Rights and Freedoms. They are held not to arise from criminal proceedings, as "the purpose ... is to promote honesty and deter gross negligence" and "it is rational that the state would only wish to impose a penalty on those who engage in misconduct knowingly, recklessly, or with a particular intention." They also do not attract a true penal consequence, as "high administrative monetary penalties [are] required to encourage compliance with the administrative regime. The relevant question is not the amount of the penalty in absolute terms, it is whether the amount serves regulatory rather than penal purposes."

However, normal standards of judicial review continue to apply. In Guindon, the Federal Court of Appeal provided more guidance in its judgment as to when an administrative penalty would be considered disproportionate. The Ontario Court of Appeal has given a reasoned evaluation for a monetary penalty that arose from a securities proceeding, and the Administrative Tribunal of Quebec has recognized that a person can bring forward the "reasonable, prudent and diligent person" defence that exists in civil law against the imposition of AMPs.

The Government of Canada has introduced various AMP schemes on a sector-by-sector basis, (Note: Including the Aeronautics Act, the Customs Act, the Income Tax Act, the Employment Insurance Act and the Agriculture and Agri-Food Administrative Monetary Penalties Act.) although some agencies prefer to pursue ticketing schemes for specified summary offences, notably under the Contraventions Act.

Ontario is considering creating a new AMP system to address minor offences that are currently prosecuted under its Provincial Offences Act. The Attorney General of Ontario has requested input into the new system being proposed. In response, some have suggested that, with proper planning, an online system would be more cost-efficient and promote easier access to justice for people in rural areas and for those with language barriers. However, some people fear that a new system will be cumbersome and will not allow access to justice.
