= R v DB =

Canadian legal decision

- Supreme Court of Canada

Hearing: October 10, 2007 Judgment: May 16, 2008
- Full case name: Her Majesty The Queen v. DB
- Citations: 2008 SCC 25
- Docket No.: 31460

Court membership
- Chief Justice: Beverley McLachlin; Puisne Justices: Michel Bastarache, Ian Binnie, Louis LeBel, Marie Deschamps, Morris Fish, Rosalie Abella, Louise Charron, Marshall Rothstein

Reasons given
- Majority: Abella J. (paras. 1-102), joined by McLachlin C.J. and Binnie, LeBel and Fish JJ.
- Dissent: Rothstein J. (paras. 103-192), joined by Bastarache, Deschamps and Charron JJ.

R v DB [2008] 2 S.C.R. 3, 2008 SCC 25 is a landmark decision of the Supreme Court of Canada on youth justice and sentencing. The Court held the provisions of the Youth Criminal Justice Act that required presumptive adult sentences for youth convicted of certain offences to be unconstitutional. Ruling that the presumption of diminished moral blameworthiness for young persons was a principle of fundamental justice under section 7 of the Charter of Rights and Freedoms and that the impugned provisions unconstitutionally deprived them of their liberty by presuming their moral blameworthiness to be equivalent to adults.

== Background ==
=== Section 7 ===
Section 7 of the Charter states:

Everyone has the right to life, liberty and security of the person and the right not to be deprived thereof except in accordance with the principles of fundamental justice.

The section prohibits deprivations of life, liberty, and the security of a person unless done so in accordance with the principles of fundamental justice. The principles of fundamental justice have been identified by courts on a case-by-case

In order to qualify, there must be a sufficient societal consensus that the proposed legal principle is fundamental to the fair operation of the legal system, and it must be able to be identified with sufficient precision to yield a manageable standard against which life, liberty, and security of person can be measured.

=== The YCJA and presumptive offences ===
The Youth Criminal Justice Act instituted procedures in which a young person (defined in the act as anyone aged 12 through 17) could either be sentenced as an adult, or as a young person. With widespread implications for the maximum sentence available, the sentencing principles to be used to determine the sentence, whether custody would be imposed, the sealing of criminal records, and protection of the youth's privacy.

If the young person was at least 14 years of age at the time of the offence and was convicted for an offence punishable by more than two years of imprisonment, the crown could seek an adult sentence. However, there was a presumption in favour of a youth sentence, and the crown had the burden of rebutting it.

However, the act created an exception for certain 'presumptive offences', for which if the youth were convicted, they would be presumptively subject to an adult sentence. A youth sentence could still be available, but the young person would have the burden of satisfying the court that the presumption in favour of an adult sentence had been rebutted. The definition of presumptive offence included murder, attempted murder, and aggravated sexual assault, in addition to other violent offences if the youth had multiple prior convictions for certain violent offences.

A distinct but similar provision created a presumption in favour of the act's mandatory publication ban on the young person's identity being waived if the accused was convicted of certain violent offences unless the youth could convince the court to retain it. This provision applied whether the accused got an adult or youth sentence, and it was possible for a young person to get a youth sentence while simultaneously losing the protection of the publication ban.

=== Factual background ===
D.B was heading out to the mall with his friends when a fight broke out with R. He punched R to the ground, knocking him unconscious, before panicking and fleeing. By the time the paramedics arrived, R had no vital signs and was taken to the hospital. B learned of his death later that night when he received a call informing him of it. He was arrested the following morning at his friend's house. He pleaded guilty to manslaughter.

B tried to apply for a youth sentence but was opposed by the crown, B challenged the constitutionality of the presumptive offence regime arguing that it imposed an impermissible reverse onus on the accused. The trial judge agreed and issued a declaration of unconstitutionality against the provisions. The Court of Appeal for Ontario dismissed the crown's appeal.

== Judgement ==
Justice Rosalie Abella, writing for the majority, held that the presumptive offence provisions violated section 7 and were unconstitutional. Not only because of the reverse onus, which infringed the established principle that the crown has the burden of proving aggravating factors, as a component of substantive presumption of innocence. But also because they violated the presumption of diminished moral blameworthiness for youth, a new principle of fundamental justice the court took the opportunity to recognize in the case.

In recognizing the new principle, Abella J reviewed the long tradition of the Canadian justice system treating youth and adult accused differently. She reviewed the Juvenile Delinquents Act and the Young Offenders Act, which taken together with the YCJA demonstrated a century-old practice of distinctive treatment for juvenile offenders relative to similarly situated adults. She noted that the motivation for enacting said laws was rooted in the belief that youth were less morally blameworthy, and more in need of an approach centred on welfare and rehabilitation. She also found further support for this notion in Convention on the Rights of the Child, of which Canada was a signatory. She also noted it was widely acknowledged that age plays a role in decision-making capacity and moral development, and Canadian courts had long taken notice of that fact. Overall, Abella held that there was widespread societal consensus that the presumption of diminished moral blameworthiness was fundamental to the fair operation of the legal system. She also found the principle to yield a manageable legal standard.

Ultimately, Abella J held that the presumption of diminished moral blameworthiness for young persons was the principle of fundamental justice, flowing from their heightened vulnerability, lower maturity, and reduced capacity for judgement. And held that the principle would require youth to be subject to youth sentences unless the crown could discharge its burden of establishing the presumption had been rebutted.

Abella J then also turned to the publication ban provisions, holding that the protection of the young person's privacy was a manifestation of the presumption of diminished moral blameworthiness, because it aided the rehabilitation of youth by preventing stigmatization, and shielded the youth from greater psychological and social stress. Holding that the lifting of the ban rendered the sentence significantly more severe, she held that putting the onus on the youth to justify why they remained entitled to a publication ban was also a violation of section 7.

== See also ==
- List of Supreme Court of Canada cases (McLachlin Court)
- List of Supreme Court of Canada cases
