= Civil penalty =

Financial penalty imposed by a government agency as restitution for wrongdoing

A civil penalty or civil fine is a financial penalty imposed by a government agency as restitution for wrongdoing. The wrongdoing is typically defined by a codification of legislation, regulations, and decrees. The civil fine is not considered to be a criminal punishment, because it is primarily sought in order to compensate the state for harm done to it, rather than to punish the wrongful conduct. As such, a civil penalty, in itself, will not carry a punishment of imprisonment or other legal penalties.

== Civil versus criminal penalty ==
If a person were to dump toxic waste in a public park, the state would have the same right to seek to recover the cost of cleaning up the mess as would a private landowner, and to bring the complaint to a court of law, if necessary.

Civil penalties occupy a strange place in some legal systems - because they are not criminal penalties, the state need not meet a high burden of proof, such as "beyond a reasonable doubt"; but because the action is brought by the government, and some civil penalties can run into very large sums, it would be uncomfortable to subject citizens to them by a burden of proof that is merely a "preponderance of the evidence" or "balance of probabilities". For this reason, in some jurisdictions, assessment of most civil penalties requires a finding of "clear and convincing evidence" before a civil defendant will be held liable. A defendant may well raise excuses, justifications, affirmative defenses, and procedural defenses. An administrative law judge or hearing officer may oversee the proceedings and render a judgment.

In some cases, a civil penalty may be supplemented by other legal process, including administrative sanctions or even criminal charges, and their respective appeals. For example, failure to pay a fine assessed for a traffic code violation may result in administrative suspension of a driver's license, and further driving after suspension may be a criminal offense. On the other hand, a minimal case may be "put on file", or otherwise suspended for a period during which the defendant may be required to avoid further violations, or carry out specific duties (such as making repairs or restitution, or attending supplemental education), after which the matter is dismissed.

In other cases, such as public safety and consumer protection violations, the local authorities may revoke permits and licenses, and seek injunction to stop or remove non-conforming works or goods, in addition to the civil penalty.

Pending or admitted civil violations may also be used as evidence of responsibility in a civil suit. One example is speeding causing in a car accident, resulting in a wrongful death claim. However, the plaintiff may be required to prove causation through a harm encompassed in the regulations.

== Civil Penalties in England ==
The concept of civil penalties in English is in a state of flux. In contract, damages is a remedy to provide monetary compensation for loss; and damages may be unliquidated (general damages), or liquidated (pre-determined). In the absence of an out-of court settlement, unliquidated damages must be ascertained by a court or tribunal, whereas liquidated damages will be determined by reference to the contract or to a mutually agreed arbitrator. The purpose of liquidated damages is to provide certainty and to avoid both the bother and cost of legal proceedings.

It is well established that liquidated damages for breach of contract are void if they seek to punish rather than to compensate for loss. For a contractual "penalty" clause to be valid, one must show that it was drawn up after a bona fide attempt to estimate loss in advance of the breach. For example, a motorway construction contract may have an estimated finish date with a "penalty clause" for every day late; but provided that this date is realistic and the "penalty" is a reasonable approximation of loss, the clause will be valid. The validity of the clause will be advanced if there is an equivalent bonus for finishing early.

Difficulties can arise with fines for wrongful parking (parking in the wrong area, or overstaying). There are three scenarios: (i) parking on public streets; & parking in a private car park either (ii) with permission, or (iii) without permission. If a parking fine is imposed for type (i), since the powers exercised by the local authority have been delegated by Parliament, there is little that one can do, except to seek judicial review and allege disproportionality. If it is type (ii), such as in a supermarket car-park, then contract rules apply. If, say, the cost was £1 for an hour, and you got a £60 ticket for overstaying a further hour, you can legally send them an extra £1, plus (say) £5 as a contribution to their administration expenses. If they are not satisfied, they would have to issue a county court summons, which might not be cost effective.

In type (iii) where one has parked on private land without permission, a typical notice might read: "In parking on this land, you hereby accept that your vehicle will be clamped and a £100 release charged". Although this may seem a simple matter of trespass with an unavoidable fine, it may amount to a case of implied contract (i.e. "if you park here, you agree to pay a penalty"); and such a "penalty" (read "damages") must be proportionate or else the fine will be void. Also, since the penalty notice could have been attached to the windscreen, the clamping of the vehicle may itself be unlawful trespass. Since the introduction of the Protection of Freedoms Act 2012 (also known as POFA), wheel clamping is illegal unless by an Authority (e.g. Police, Local Authority or DVLA).

== Civil Penalties in the United States ==
Both the substance and process of civil penalties for pollution of water and air in the United States vary widely by state.

=== Federal Agencies Authorized to Issue Civil Penalties ===
- Commodity Futures Trading Commission
- Consumer Financial Protection Bureau
- Corporation for National and Community Service
- Department of Agriculture
- Department of Commerce
- Department of Defense
- Department of Education
- Department of Energy
- Department of Health and Human Services (HHS)
- Department of Homeland Security
- Department of Housing and Urban Development
- Department of Justice
- Department of Labor (DOL)
- Department of State
- Department of the Interior (DOI)
- Department of the Treasury
- Department of Transportation
- Department of Veterans Affairs
- Environmental Protection Agency
- Equal Employment Opportunity Commission
- Farm Credit Administration
- Farm Credit System Insurance Corporation (FCSIC)
- Federal Communications Commission
- Federal Deposit Insurance Corporation (FDIC)
- Federal Election Commission
- Federal Energy Regulatory Commission
- Federal Housing Finance Agency
- Federal Maritime Commission
- Federal Reserve Board of Governors (FRB)
- Federal Trade Commission
- General Services Administration
- Merit Systems Protection Board
- National Aeronautics and Space Administration
- National Credit Union Administration (NCUA)
- National Endowment for the Arts
- National Endowment for the Humanities
- National Indian Gaming Commission (NIGC)
- National Science Foundation
- National Transportation Safety Board
- Nuclear Regulatory Commission
- Office of Government Ethics
- Office of Personnel Management
- Pension Benefit Guaranty Corporation (PBGC)
- Railroad Retirement Board
- Securities and Exchange Commission
- Small Business Administration
- Social Security Administration
- Surface Transportation Board
- United States Postal Service (USPS)

== See also ==
- Administrative monetary penalty
- Administrative Procedures Act
- Administrative law
- Building code, as an example for public safety
- Civil wrong
- Criminal justice financial obligations
- Federal Trade Commission, which uses civil penalties for consumer protection
- Pollution
- Presumption of guilt
- Violation of the law
