= Youth Criminal Justice Act =

Canadian statute

Parliament of Canada
- Long title: An Act in respect of criminal justice for young persons and to amend and repeal other Acts
- Citation: SC 2002, c. 1
- Considered by: House of Commons of Canada
- Considered by: Senate of Canada
- Assented to: 2002-02-19

Legislative history

Initiating chamber: House of Commons of Canada
- Bill citation: Bill C-7, 37th Parliament, 1st Session
- Introduced by: Anne McLellan, Minister of Justice
- First reading: 2001-02-05
- Second reading: 2001-03-26
- Third reading: 2001-05-29

Revising chamber: Senate of Canada
- Member(s) in charge: Landon Pearson
- First reading: 2001-05-30
- Second reading: 2001-09-25
- Third reading: 2001-12-18

Repeals
- Young Offenders Act (RSC 1985, c. Y-1)
- Status: In force

The Youth Criminal Justice Act (YCJA; French: Loi sur le système de justice pénale pour les adolescents) is a federal Canadian statute that covers the prosecution of youths for criminal offences.

Coming into effect on April 1, 2003, the Act replaced the Young Offenders Act, which itself was a replacement for the Juvenile Delinquents Act.

== Definition of youth ==
The Act governs the application of criminal and correctional law to those 12 years old or older, but younger than 18 at the time of committing the offence (Section 2 of the YCJA). Youth aged 14 to 17 may be sentenced as adults under certain conditions, as described later on in the Act. The Criminal Code, section 13, states "No person shall be convicted of an offence in respect of an act or omission on their part while that person was under the age of twelve years."

== Preamble ==
The preamble of the Act recognizes that youth have rights protected by the Canadian Charter of Rights and Freedoms, the Canadian Bill of Rights and the United Nations' Convention on the Rights of the Child.

== Declaration of principles ==
The Act includes four general principles found in section 3(1).

=== Basic principles and intentions ===
Paragraph (a) addresses the basic principles of the Act and the Act's intentions on dealing with young offenders and youth crime. More specifically, paragraph (a) sets the basic principle that the YCJA attempts to address underlying behaviour, such as pre-existing conditions or circumstances that would lead to an offending behaviour. It also seeks to, above all, reintegrate young persons who commit offences into society through means of rehabilitation.

=== Accountability, rehabilitation, and reintegration ===
Paragraph (b) incorporates a recognition that young people need to be held accountable for their crimes, and have a greater opportunity to be rehabilitated and reintegrated into society. The criminal justice system for young persons must be separate from that of adults and emphasize the following:

(i) Rehabilitation and Reintegration: The implementation of extrajudicial measures instead of more punitive sentences for less serious offences "address the rehabilitative needs of youths within the limit of a proportionate response to the offence". The goal is to first rehabilitate and then reintegrate (assisting a young offender to adjust back into their community).

(ii) Fair/proportionate accountability with greater dependency and reduced maturity: During sentencing "proportionality determines the degree of intervention of the sentence". The court must hold the offender accountable only for the acts committed. Therefore, "accountability is to occur through the imposition of meaningful consequences and measures that will promote the rehabilitation and reintegration of youth into society". The offender's level of maturity is considered when deciding on a response to the offence that is both fair and proportionate.

(iii) Enhanced procedural protection, fairness, rights: These procedural protections are there to guarantee that young people's rights are protected and that they are treated fairly. Some of these rights include but are not limited to: right to privacy, right to talk with a lawyer and an adult.

(iv) Ensure timely intervention reinforces link between offence and consequence.

(v) Promptness and speed with which persons responsible for this Act must act, given young persons' perception of time.

=== Social values ===
Paragraph (c) is meant to reflect social values while taking into account each individual's unique situation. It outlines the parameters within which the measures taken against a youth offender are set:

(i) Reinforce respect for societal values by implementing exercises that contribute positively to a youth's rehabilitation.

(ii) Encourage repair of harm done to victims and emphasizing their rights. Furthermore, repair of harm done to the community is also encouraged.

(iii) Be meaningful for the individual young person given their needs and level of development and, where appropriate, involve the parents, the extended family, the community and social or other agencies in the young person's rehabilitation and reintegration. The Act provides a much bigger role for the parents and the community.

(iv) Respect gender, ethnic, cultural and linguistic differences and respond to the needs of aboriginal young persons and of young persons with special requirements.

=== Rights and considerations ===
Paragraph (d) describes the special considerations for criminal proceedings against young persons. It highlights four in particular.

(i) The rights of young persons, such as right to be heard in the course of and to participate in the processes and the special guarantees of their rights and freedoms

(ii) The rights of victims. They should be treated with courtesy, compassion and respect for their dignity and privacy and should suffer the minimum degree of inconvenience as a result of their involvement with the YCJS - youth criminal justice system.

(iii) The role of victims. They should be provided with information about the proceedings and given opportunity to participate and be heard.

(iv) The role of parents. The parents should be informed of their child's proceedings, and are encouraged to support them in addressing their offending behaviour. (vi)

== Extrajudicial measures ==
Under Part 1 of the Act, extrajudicial measures are used for responding to less serious youth crimes in a timely and effective manner. Police are the first officials to be encountered within the system and possess the power to use discretion in deciding whether to issue a warning, a police caution, or a charge. If the youth agrees, the police can also refer the youth to a program under section 7 of the Act. If the police decide to refer the case to the courts, the Crown can choose to issue a Crown caution.

If a warning, caution or referral was issued it means that the police officer has taken no further action on the offence. If a warning, caution, or referral is not appropriate, an extrajudicial sanction may be considered as well.

=== Principles ===
Section 4 of the Act sets out principles that govern the establishment of policies about extrajudicial measures:

1. They are often most appropriate to address youth crime;
2. They allow for effective intervention focused on correcting offending behaviour;
3. They are presumed to be adequate for young persons charged with a non-violent offence and are not guilty of any prior offence and
4. They should be used if they are sufficient to hold a young offender accountable and may be used if a young person has previously been dealt with by extrajudicial measures.

=== Objectives ===
These measures are applied by police and Crown attorneys with the intention that youth can be held liable through non-court measures for their offence(s).

Under Section 5 of the Act, objectives of these measures are to:

1. Provide an effective and timely response to offending behaviour outside of judicial measures.
2. Encourage young persons to acknowledge and repair the harm caused to the victim/community.
3. Encourage families and members of the community to get involved in implementing the measures.
4. Provide victims with a chance to take part in the decisions relating to the measures and to receive reparation.
5. Respect the freedoms of young persons and ensure proportionality to the seriousness of the crime.

These objectives are specially designed so that a wide range of diversionary options are available to achieve an array of objectives and it is important to take into consideration many factors when deciding on a fair response to the offence. For example, if the young person has already started reparation to the harm done to the victim, the person deciding on the type of extrajudicial measure should consider that factor when determining an appropriate response.

=== Types of extrajudicial measures ===
There are four types of extrajudicial measures (not including extrajudicial sanctions):

1. Warnings are informal warnings issued by police officers. They are usually used for minor crimes.
2. Police cautions are formal warnings from the police. In some jurisdictions, it is expected that police cautions will be in the form of a letter from the police to the young person and the parents, or they may involve a process in which the young person and the parents are requested to appear at a police station to talk to a senior police officer.
3. Crown cautions are similar to police cautions but prosecutors give the caution after the police refer the case to them. In one province where they are currently being used, the caution is in the form of a letter to the young person and the parents.
4. Referring to different community

=== Extrajudicial sanctions ===
An extrajudicial sanction is defined as a type of extrajudicial measure used to deal with a young person only if they cannot be adequately dealt by a warning, caution or referral as outlined above. Conditions that dictate this are the seriousness of the offence, the nature and number of previous offences committed by the young person or any other aggravating circumstances. Extrajudicial sanctions examples include restitution or compensation, service to the victim or community, attendance and participating in counselling and treatment programs, etc.

Formerly termed as alternative measures under the Young Offenders Act extrajudicial sanctions are important for they are a good alternative option to the formal court process for the young person. If they comply satisfactorily with the sanction the charge can be dismissed. However, failure to comply or unsatisfactory performance may result in a charge or return to court. The decision whether to apply an extrajudicial sanction lies in with the police officer, Crown Prosecutor, or other officials and in comparison to other types of extrajudicial measures, a more formal set of rules applies to extrajudicial sanctions. Further, although it appears that the charge has "gone away", if the youth reoffends the sanction can be brought up at the next hearing.

==== Restriction on using extrajudicial sanctions ====
Extrajudicial sanctions can only be used if:

1. Other extrajudicial measures are not suitable: informal warning, police caution, Crown caution or referral to community program(s);
2. The program suggested is allowed by the government of that jurisdiction;
3. The program is appropriate, considering the young person's needs and the interests of society;
4. The young person has made an informed consent to participate (the young person must know about the sanction, must be given the right to counsel, must be given an opportunity to consult with counsel, and must consent to its use;
5. The young person accepts responsibility for the crime;
6. There is sufficient evidence for the Crown to proceed with the charge(s) and prosecution; and
7. A parent is notified.

Extrajudicial sanctions cannot be used if:

1. The young person denies being involved in the offence;
2. The young person wants a trial in court; or
3. The young person fails to be allowed into the program

== Youth justice committees ==
Section 18(1) of the Youth Justice Committees (YJCs) help in the administering of the Act by devolving power to the community. YJCs facilitate interaction between the victim and offender, and recommend appropriate programs/services to treat their situation. Each committee is a group of trained volunteers from the local community. Their main activities include the following:

a. for the youth charged with an offence:

- Recommending an appropriate extrajudicial measure to be used
- Victim support by addressing concerns and mediating between victim and offender
- Ensuring community support by arranging for the use of communal services, and recruiting short-term mentors and supervisors
- Coordinating interaction between the youth criminal justice system and any outside agency/group

b. Reporting to the federal and provincial governments on whether protective measures of the act are followed
c. Advising the federal and provincial governments on policies and procedures related to the youth criminal justice system
d. Informing the public in respect of the YCJA and the youth criminal justice system;
e. Setting up conferences
f. Any other task assigned by The Attorney General of Canada or a provincial minister

Operating under the paradigm of restorative justice, YJCs aim to "strike the right balance between accountability and community intervention" YJCs are used extensively in Manitoba, Alberta and New Brunswick. A committee's activity largely depends on volunteer efforts from its community. Trained members work to create extrajudicial measures for young people, but failure to comply with measures given ultimately results in return to the formal justice system.

== Right to counsel ==
=== General ===
The Act in Section 25(1) gives a youth the right to retain and instruct counsel without delay, which was amended by the Canadian Charter of Rights and Freedoms. This means that young persons who are arrested or detained for any reason must be told of their right to obtain a lawyer before any lawful procedures are conducted. The youth must also be given the opportunity to obtain this counsel. If the youth does not have a lawyer present at the first court date, the judge must inform the youth of their right of counsel. Before accepting a plea, the court must

1. Ensure that the young person understands the charge
2. Explain the plea options
3. Explain the process of applying a youth sentence

The young person has right to counsel upon arrest or detention, before a voluntary statement, during consideration of extrajudicial sanctions, and at a hearing. If the youth is denied legal aid for any reason, the court can order that counsel be given to the youth- in order to comply with the right to counsel If at any point the parent's interests and the youth's interests are in conflict, the presiding judge may also order counsel be obtained for the youth Even though right to counsel is guaranteed by the Act, studies have shown that youth tend to not take advantage of counsel, leading many to question the validity and authenticity of Section 25(1).

=== Appointment of counsel ===
The delivery of legal counsel has two primary models: Judicare and Staff delivery model text to display. In judicare delivery model, lawyers in private practice are issued certificates to provide legal aid to clients. In the staff lawyer system, the service is provided by lawyers that are employed directly by the legal aid plan. The proportion of Young offender legal aid is equally divided between the two. Section 25 of the Act outlines the young individual's right to counsel, which was amended from the Charter of Human Rights and Freedoms. The aim is to protect the youth's right to counsel in all stages of the youth justice process and ensure the individual understands the justice process. According to the Act section 25 (4): If the young individual is unable to obtain legal assistance or no legal aid program is available, the young offender is able to request counsel. The counsel to represent the young individual is to be appointed by the Attorney General according to the section 25(5) of the Youth Justice Act. For example, a young individual may request legal aid if unable to afford a lawyer. If eligible, a lawyer will be appointed by the attorney general.

=== Assistance by adult ===
The Canadian Charter of rights and freedoms and the Act both hold the right to legal representation for youth. The purpose is to provide extensive opportunity for legal advocacy and advice prior to and during the court process. However, when a young person is not represented by counsel at trial or at a hearing, the justice presiding over the case or the youth justice court may allow youth to be assisted by an adult at the request of the young person. For this to occur, the youth court of justice or the review board must find an adult who is deemed to be suitable in assisting the young person. This right is given to make the process for the young person easier, as the young person can obtain adult assistance from someone that they are more familiar with. Despite the fact that section 25(7) does not specify specific requirements for the ideal suitable adult, this tends to be assessed on a case-by-case basis to the specific needs of the young person.

=== Statement to youth ===
The Statement of Right to Counsel requires that the young person be provided with a written statement that reminds them that they do have the right to request and be represented by legal counsel at any time during the judicial process. Included at various stages of the judicial process, the Statement, ensures that the young person remains alert to their rights, to the continued availability of counsel and to their options for counsel (i.e., Legal Aid). The Statement must be included with appearance notices or summons, arrest warrants, promises to appear, in all notifications of sentence review and also with all undertakings or recognisance that the young person may participate in under the auspices of the officer in charge. It must also be included with other notifications of legal proceedings such as custody continuations, conditional supervision, decision reviews and all youth justice court reviews. The repetition of the document serves as a reminder not only to the young person, but also to those within the judicial system that it is necessary to protect the rights of the young person and guarantee that those rights are upheld throughout the judicial process.

=== Explanation appropriate to age and understanding ===
Every accused person in Canada has the right to be informed of their rights and what they are being charged of, according to the legal rights of the Arrest and Detention section of the Charter of Rights and Freedoms. According to section 146 (2) (b) of the Act, Young persons under the age of 18 must have their rights explained by the officer in a language appropriate to their age and level of understanding. Therefore, the officer must assess the accused youth's ability to understand their rights before attaining a statement from the youth. It is imperative that the officer states the rights to the youth in a manner that he or she fully understands due to the fact that the courts will not assess whether the child fully understood the rights inform to them by the officer but whether or not the officer explained their rights at a level appropriate to their age and understanding.

Officers employ such techniques as having the youth repeat or summarize in their own words the rights that were transmitted to them to avoid having any testimonies made by the accused youth waived by the courts.

=== Right to counsel ===
The fundamental paradigm shift from the Youth Offenders Act to the Youth Criminal Justice Act involves the view that deviant youth are now viewed as offenders responsible for their actions. In a similar comparison to that of adults, the youth are encouraged to obtain legal counsel. The youth justice court or review board is required as a legal implication to advise the young person of their right to counsel. The following are some typical situations that warrant such advice: at a hearing for the youth when determining to detain or release the individual, at a youth's trial, and in situations where the custody of the youth is in question such as conditional supervision and decision reviews. The youth justice court or review board is more specifically required to provide a reasonable opportunity to obtain such counsel and this act is viewed as a mandated judicial measure. A specific difference in comparison to adult courts is the fact that it prohibits criminal proceedings against a youth without the consent of the Attorney General. In terms of adult proceedings, it is possible for members of the public to commence proceedings without the authorization of police and the Crown Attorney; however, that is not the case with youth. While comparing the Youth Offenders Act to the Youth Criminal Justice Act, the former focuses more on a youth's choice to retain counsel and the role of lawyers in the criminal justice system. In terms of the JDA, more focus was placed on a youth being viewed as a misguided individual who required guidance from the courts.

Sections 25(4) and (10) allow young people to obtain the same rights as adults, in terms of legal counsel, consent, etc. It is also necessary that young persons be given the right to consult a parent or other adult in some circumstances.

Subsection 25(10) of the Act permits provinces to establish a program for the recovery of costs of a young person's counsel from the young person or the parents of that young person. Therefore, young people are represented by permanent salaried legal aid lawyers or, as per the specified choice, by a private lawyer who accepts the legal aid mandate payable according to the pre-established rates. If a young offender is ineligible he is represented by a private lawyer at a cost agreed upon by the youth and/or his parents and the lawyer.

== Notice to parents ==
Under the Act, in case of the arrest or detention of a young person, the officer in charge must give notice to a parent either orally or in writing as soon as they possibly can under section 26(1). The notice must include under section 26(6) the following information: (a) the name of the young person (b) the charge against the young person and (c) a statement that the young person has the right to be represented by counsel. In addition, if summons, appearance of notice or promise to appear is issued in respect of a young person, the parent must be given notice in writing in person or via mail under section 26(2). Both sections 26(1) and 26(2) are subject to subsection 26(4), which states that if the whereabouts of the parents of the young person are not available, notice may be given to an adult who the person giving the notice considers appropriate. If there is a failure to give notice to a parent upon the arrest of a young person all proceedings continue and are not considered invalid under this act.

== Arrest and detention ==
Youths may be arrested by the police for more serious offences. The rights expressed in the Canadian Charter of Rights and Freedoms apply to youths and adults.

Youths and adults have the right to obtain immediate legal counsel of their own choice upon arrest or detention. The Youth offender also has the right to have their parent(s) or guardian(s) present during questioning. Upon arrest or detainment, these rights must be explained in clear and understandable language.

If the police have violated the above rights, the charges may be dismissed by a judge or any statements made to the police may be ruled inadmissible by the judge in court.

Presumptive offences were found to be unconstitutional and are no longer included in the Act. A presumptive offence is an offence committed or alleged to have been committed by a young person who has attained the age of fourteen years. An adult sentence can be imposed on a young person who is found guilty of an offence for which an adult can be sentenced to imprisonment for more than two years if the offence was committed after a young person is fourteen years of age. Presumptive offence may be used under one of the following charges: first-degree or second-degree murder, attempt to commit murder, manslaughter or aggravated sexual assault. Other serious offences can fall within presumptive offence if it is the third conviction for such an offence. The age of fourteen may sometimes be raised in a province where the Lieutenant Governor in council has fixed the age greater than fourteen. Youths who are 12 or 13 at the time of the offence may be sentenced in the same way, only for the following: first degree or second degree murder or manslaughter.

== Trial procedures ==
Trials for both adults and youths follow the same rules for evidence and are equally formal.

== Privacy ==
Section 110 of the Act outlines privacy in relation to the identity of young offenders, access to their criminal records, and disclosure of their personal or trial information.

The Act trial information can be published in media or print but identifying information (i.e., name) about young offenders cannot. This publication ban exists to prevent stigmatization of young offenders, which has been found to hinder the rehabilitation of youth. Furthermore, the identity of youth victims cannot be published for the same reasons. Breaking the publication ban is a criminal offence. It is unknown whether publication of identifying information on social networking sites like Facebook is a violation of the ban, which has been the source of controversy.

The ban is lifted in respect to any adult sentences the young person receives, and can be otherwise lifted only under exceptional circumstances, including:

- if the identifying information is necessary for the capture of a young offender;
- or if the young offender requests for their name to be published. Youth requests for publication are subject to judicial discretion.

Youth criminal records cannot be viewed by anyone other than criminal justice officials (e.g. lawyers) and only within particular time frames from the offence.

Disclosure ("the communication of information other than by way of publication" of youth information is banned under the Act. Communicating information about youth offenders through disclosure is a criminal offence

== Detention prior to sentencing section 29 ==
Under the Act, prior to conviction, detention is prohibited and deemed unnecessary. One of the new provisions of the Act is to limit the use of pre-trial detention and to promote alternatives to incarceration. Under the Youth Offenders Act, pre-trial detention was on the rise and Canada, out of the western countries, had one of the highest youth incarceration rates. Not only was the use of pre-trial detention high, it also varied widely across the provinces. Pre-trial detention is not meant to be punitive, but research found negative outcomes associated with it as well, such as depravity of freedom and seclusion from the outside world. Many youth in custody prior to their sentencing were also found guilty more often than youths not in custody. The inconsistent use of pre-trial detention and negative connotations were cause enough for revision.

== Purpose of sentencing ==
=== Purpose ===
The fundamental purpose in the sentencing of young persons pursuant to the Act is to strike the best possible balance between the interests of the young person and the interests of society. The sentencing judge will also endeavour to impose a sentence that encourages the youth to take responsibility for the consequences of their actions.[s.3, s.38 YCJA]

Canadian appellate courts and the Supreme Court of Canada have repeatedly affirmed the principle that young persons convicted of crimes must be sentenced differently from adults. A notable example is the Ontario decision of R v D.T. '2006 OJ 112' (Citation is wrong) where the Court asserted that a separate youth sentencing process is fundamental to Canadian societal notions of justice.

In R v C.D. / C.D.K[2005 SCC 78], the Supreme Court of Canada confirmed that youths will receive the most favourable interpretation available of the Act's sentencing provisions. In C.D / C.D.K., the Court ruled that 'violent crime' as defined in s.39 of the Act did not include arson; the offender was thereby entitled to a more lenient disposition.[ibid, 85]

Since the enactment of the Act in 2003, a greater number of young persons charged with criminal offences have received the benefit of diversion that was the practice under the former Young Offenders Act.[Bala (2007), 7]. Diversion refers to the broad range of non-criminal sanctions, including community service that if satisfactorily completed by the youth, the subject charge is withdrawn.

=== Committal to custody ===
Section 39 (1) of the Act maintains that a custodial sentence should not be imposed on young offenders unless certain mandatory conditions outlined in the section are satisfied. The purpose of this section is to provide specific guidance to judges who are considering imposing a custodial sentence with the principal focus of reducing Canada's "over-reliance on the incarceration of non-violent young persons". Section 39 (1) (a) specifically places restrictions on the use of custodial sentences for non-violence offences unless the offender has a history of failing to comply with noncustodial sentences and has created a risk to public safety with those violations, has an extensive pattern of non-violent offending, or other exceptional circumstances. In addition to satisfying at least one of the conditions of section 39(1), the courts must also ensure the balance of section 39 when considering a custodial sentence of a non-violent offence. Also, the judges must take into account any rehabilitative concerns that would alter the nature and reduce the severity of the sentence by mitigating factors. For an example, courts must be certain to not impose a severe sentence in situations of rehabilitative of child welfare concerns. For an example, a custodial sentence should not be imposed to achieve rehabilitation purposes or to tackle such social circumstances such as lack of housing or an abusive home environment.

Section 39 of the Act restricts the use of custodial sentences for young persons This means that the young person should not be taken into custody unless the young person or their offence meet certain criteria. Subsection (1) (d) defines one of these criteria and states that custodial sentences may be used in those exceptional cases where the youth has committed an indictable offence. Further, the nature of the indictable offence must be such that imposing a non-custodial sentence would not fulfil the purpose and principles of sentencing as outlined in section 38 of the Act. Section 38 of the Act states that the young person is to be held accountable for their actions and rehabilitated into society. Thus, as defined in 39 (1) (d), custodial sentences and imprisonment and to be used only in response to offences that are indictable and when non-custodial sentences are inappropriate with regards to the circumstances and the nature of the offence. Overall the YCJA is an effective program used for the youths.

=== Alternatives to custody ===
39.(2) "If any of 39(1)(a) to (c) apply, a youth justice court shall not impose a custodial sentence under section 42 unless the court has considered all alternatives to custody raised at the sentencing hearing that are reasonable in the circumstances, and determined that there is not a reasonable alternative, or combination of alternatives, that is in accordance with the purpose and principles set out in section 38.

39.(3) "In determining whether there is a reasonable alternative to custody, a youth justice court shall consider submissions relating to:

(a) the alternatives to custody that are available;

(b) the likelihood that the young person will comply with a non-custodial sentence, taking into account their compliance with previous non-custodial sentences; and

(c) the alternatives to custody that have been used in respect of young persons for similar offences committed in similar circumstances.

The above entails that even though a 'serious offence' was committed by a youth, it does not automatically equate to time in custody. The presiding official in a youth justice court must review all options other than custody by utilizing the factors outlined in 39 (3). Specifically section 39 (2) prohibits the court from imposing custody unless all alternatives have been considered. The reason for said sections within the Act is to reduce the use of custody as a sentencing option, and consequently the number of youth in custody, and to ensure that the most intrusive response to youth offending is only used in serious cases. The inclusion of these sections displays a stark difference between the Young Offenders Act and the Youth Criminal Justice Act as the former did not have such clear preconditions that had to be satisfied prior to the imposition of a custodial sentence and thus large numbers of youth were incarcerated under the Young Offenders Act.

=== Reports for sentencing hearings ===
Reports for sentencing hearings are used in more serious cases in order to assist in determining an appropriate sentence. The most frequently used report for sentencing hearings is the pre-sentence report which is outlined in section 40. The judge ultimately decides whether a report is necessary, though the crown may request the report and the defence counsel may argue against the issuing of a pre-sentence report. All custodial sentences require a pre-sentencing report. A pre-sentencing report is conducted by a government employee who interviews the youth and any significant influences including family members, peers and other important persons who may contribute to their report. This report is a historical outline which may include information regarding the youth's family background, school history, attitude toward their offence, willingness to engage in available community services, interview with the victim and potentially a suggestive sentence. The pre-sentence report is given to the judge, prosecutor and defence lawyers as well as the youth and any involved parent or guardian before the sentencing hearing.

==== Restitution of property ====
The Act requires that the personal circumstances of the young person be considered before ordering a sentence. Custodial sentences are reserved for very serious offences (e.g., murder, manslaughter). The Act favours noncustodial sentencing options whenever possible in order to reduce the youth incarceration rates.

Restitution of property is a noncustodial sentencing option. According to this sentence, the young person is ordered to make restitution—that is, pay back the equivalent amount of the property obtained by the young person to the lawful owner of the property. The youth justice court can fix the time and term of payment.

Other considerations during this sentence include:

- Allowing more time for completion of the sentence.
- Notifying the person to whom the restitution will be made about the sentencing order.
- The obtained property must be in possession of the young person at the time, and must lawfully belong to the owner of the property.

=== Sentencing principles ===
==== Comparison with adult sentences ====
Under sentencing principle (3) (c) of the Act, the sentencing of a youth's punishment should not by any means be harsher or surpass that of the punishment for an adult who has been found guilty of committing the same crime as the youth The reason for this sentencing principle was to eliminate discrepancies that were prevalent in the Young Offenders Act. It was formed on the basis that youth under the Young Offenders Act were receiving longer sentences than adults for the same offences. In R. v. C.D.; [2005] a youth pleaded guilty to arson, breach of a recognisance, and the possession of a weapon. He received a light sentence of six months of deferred custody due to the Youth Criminal Justice Act. Appeals against this case, state that the youth has committed an indictable offence for which an adult would be imprisoned for a period of two or more years.

==== Similarity ====
Under the sentencing principle 38 (2)(b)of the Youth Criminal Justice Act, the court requires that the sentence imposed must be similar in the region when young offenders are found guilty of the same crime under similar circumstances. This means that there should be a general level of consistency in sentences for young offenders who are guilty of the same crime. This principle addresses the unfair disparity of youth sentences, by stating that sentence should be similar, not necessarily the same Allowing such individualization makes the sentence meaningful for the youth involved and points at any rehabilitative needs required by the young offender. These sentencing principles are meant to be imposed in accordance to additional principles listed out in section 38 (3) which state that in determining the youth sentence, the court shall take in account: the degree of participation of subjected youth in offence, the degree of harm inflicted and intentions of offender, any reparations provided to victim or community by youth offender, any time spent in detention by youth due to offence, any other case of guilt found against the offender, and whether there is any additional aggravating or mitigating information against the offender that might influence the sentence read otherwise.

==== Proportionality ====
The sentencing principle 38 (2)(c)under the Act states 'the sentence must be proportionate to the seriousness of the offence and the degree of responsibility of the young person for that offence' Sentencing principles clearly explain the basis that establish fair and justifiable sentences. Under the Youth Criminal Justice Act punishments are not only limited to jail imprisonment in addition extrajudicial measures are taken such as community services and probation. The punishment is given to the offender according to the gravity of his/her offence. For young offenders, cases are viewed individually and sentencing is determined distinctively for different cases. Thus the more serious the offence is the more severe the punishment will be. Proportionality here means the size or the degree of the offence, thus the punishment should be proportional to the crime committed. So a young offender who commits murder will be severely punished compared to someone who steals. How serious was the offence, the offender's level of participation and their intention, the harm done to the victim and the previous findings of guilt are taken into account by the court to determine the sentencing of the offender.

==== Substitute to custody ====
Under the sentencing principle 38 2(d), the court is required to consider a substitute for the custody of young persons, while paying special attention to aboriginal offenders. In addition, the section also states that special concern should be given to youth by taking into account the gender, racial, and cultural differences. By responding to the needs of young aboriginal offenders, the focus of this section directs the court to use less harsh custodial sentences except when the offender poses a great threat to the public. "Special attention to the circumstances of Aboriginal offenders is mandated by the-minute amendments to the YCJA initiated by the Senate". An example of this is seen in R. V. D.R.D. (2006), in which a fourteen-year-old boy was pleaded guilty of trafficking and was appealing his sentence for drug charges. He was convicted to one year probation because the judge maintained that he is an extreme aboriginal youth which is a risk to the society.

=== Sentencing options ===
Sentencing Option 42 (2) (a) Sentencing option 42(2) under the Act is to reprimand the young person. Reprimand is a severe reproof or rebuke in this case by a person of authority.

Sentencing Option 42 (2)(b) When a young person is found guilty, through a youth justice court, the judge may refer to section 42(2)(b) under the Act. Under section 42(2)(b) a young person, when guilt is found, may be discharged absolutely. This discharge is dependent on the best interest of the young offender without being in contrast with the best interests of the public. An absolute discharge, under section 42(2)(b), in accordance with 82(2), constitutes a termination of the sentence of a young person in respect of an offence in which a young person is found guilty. As opposed to conditional discharges, absolute discharges do not carry sanctions of probation or any other condition that the court may find appropriate (fair sanctions with meaningful consequences)

Sentencing Option 42 (2)(c) Sentencing option 42 (2) c under the Act states that a convicted young offender can be discharged on any conditions the court decides to be appropriate. This may require the young offender to report to and be supervised by the provincial director. Conditions for a discharge might also include undergoing counselling, doing community service work or donation to a charity. Once the duration of the discharge has passed and the conditions of the probation have been successfully followed, the discharge becomes absolute, i.e., the youth will not be viewed as the offender although the record can be used for three years after finding of guilt in the event that there is a subsequent conviction. However, if the young person fails to abide by the conditions of probation, the offender can be convicted of the original offence and be sentenced.

Sentencing Options 42(2)(c) If a young person is found guilty, "By order direct that the young person be discharged on any conditions that the court considers appropriate and may require the young person to report to and be supervised by the provincial director". As an order under conditional release, the young offender is required to follow certain rules set out by a probation order for a specific length of time; when the time duration has passed, the release becomes absolute. The considerations for conditional discharge must be in the best interest of the offender and not contrary to public interest. The purpose of this section is to reduce the rate of incarceration of young people and promote rehabilitation and reintegration into society. If any condition is violated by the young offender, they will be required to appear in front of the court again at which point they may be incarcerated. Examples of conditions placed on the young offender are as follows:

- Abstain from alcohol or drug use
- Abstain from owning, possessing or carrying a weapon
- Perform community service
- Participate in a treatment program

Sentencing Options 42(2)(d) If a young person is found guilty of an offence in a youth justice court, the judge may impose a sentence under section 42 of the Act. The purpose of sentencing under the Act "is to hold a young person accountable for an offence by imposing fair sanctions with meaningful consequences." Under section 42(2)(d) it states that a young offender may not have a fine against them exceeding $1000 to be paid at the time and on the terms that the court may fix. This entails that the courts must have regard to the means of how the young offender will pay, as well as the ability for the young offender to be granted more time to complete the sentence. The offender then has the following options, he or she may be ordered to pay a victim fine surcharge (up to 15%) which contributes to assisting the victims of the crime. Or, the province may establish a program under which the young offender can discharge a fine under para, the percentage imposed under s53(1) or Victim fine surcharge under s 53(2) which is only attainable by earning credits for work in the program of the province the young offender resides.

Sentencing Options 42 (2)(e) Section 42(2)(e) under the Act states that the young person must pay to the other person at the time/terms that the court fixes the amount of compensation due to loss of income/support, damage of property etc.

Sentencing Options 42(2)(h) Section 42 (2) (h) under the Act is a non- custodial sentencing option that states that the Youth Justice Court (YJC) may order a young offender to compensate the victim in kind or by personal service for a damage, loss, or injury suffered. Under 42 (2) (h), an order may be made under section 42 (2) (g) where the young offender is to monetarily compensate the purchaser of a stolen property since the stolen property had to be returned to the owner, or section 42 (2) (e) where the young offender is to monetarily compensate the victim for personal injury or property that was damaged. The YJC may arrange the times and terms of compensation that is ordered. However, the compensation must not conflict with the young offender's regular schedule of education and work. The order to provide personal service to the victim can be assigned for any number of hours but is limited up to 240 hours. The hours of service ordered can be completed within one year from the date which the sentencing option was ordered; however the YJC may allow an extension of time to fully complete the sentence, on application of the young offender. Although the YJC may order the young offender to compensate the victim by providing personal service, the consent of the compensated is required.

Sentencing Options 42(2)(i) In the Act, under Sentencing options 42 (2) (i), the court has the option to order a young person to complete community service for a punishment. The amount of community service must not go beyond 240 hours of service which can be completed within 12 months. The community service must be approved by the provincial director of the youth justice court or a person designated by the youth justice court. The purpose of sentencing under section 42 is to protect society by holding the young person accountable for their actions by giving the right amount of punishment which can promote their rehabilitation and reintegration into society. This type of sentencing is a non custodial sentencing option which is the goal of the Youth Criminal Justice act to not rely on the over use of incarceration for non violent youths. It also gives out different options which can be costumed to different individual cases that can give out the best solution possible. These are the innovations that were created due to the Youth Criminal Justice Act, it helps youth to get the best rehabilitation to continue on their lives in society.

Sentencing Options 42(2)(k) Section 42(2)(k) under the Act allows a young person to be placed on Probation (as specified by conditions and other matters related to probation orders under sections 55 and 56) for a specified period of time not exceeding two years. Orders may range from being supervised by the provincial director; remain within the territorial jurisdiction of one or more courts; attending school; or having to reside at a place specified by the provincial director. The Youth Justice Court prescribes these conditions as an order so the young person will learn to be of good behaviour and appear before the youth justice court when required to do so.

Probation is the sentence most frequently imposed by youth justice courts in Canada, as the conditions laid out are directly related to the young offenders criminal behaviour. This helps the offender to see the harm caused by their actions to the society and victims, and why they should not commit such crimes again. If a young offender fails to comply with the probation order, they can possibly be charged with breach of probation. But th Act does not require the charges be laid; rather, it states that an alternative approach is recommended. Such as a review of probation orders thus providing an opportunity to make changes to conditions that can be more effective in promoting the rehabilitation and reintegration of the young person.

Sentencing Options 42 (2) (l) To ensure that a young offenders illegal actions are followed by consequences that are "(1)just; (2)have meaningful consequences for the youth; (3) and promote the rehabilitation and reintegration of the youth into society" the Act has instilled several sentencing options.

According to Section 42(2), the twelfth sentencing option for youth is the placement in an (l) intensive support and supervision program. This non-custodial sentencing option was introduce to the act along with options such as reprimand as well as non-residential programs or attendance orders.

This sentencing option is meant to be an alternative for custody, and was implemented to decrease high rates of custody caused by the Young Offenders Act. The young offender receives support and supervision from their community in hopes that they will alter their behaviour. The intent of this sentencing option is to provide more support than probation and is often used to promote the use of community-based and rehabilitation sentences.

This option encourages the rehabilitation of the youth and should target the specific needs or problems that seem to have contributed to their illegal behaviour.

This sentencing option will only take place if the government has established programs and the courts have received approval of the provincial director. If not available, a probation order will be used along with various conditions to ensure the support and supervision of the youth in question.

Sentencing Options 42 (2) (m)

This new sentencing option requires, at specific times, a young offender to attend court sanctioned programs. Over a six-month period a maximum of 240 hours that can be assigned.

This sentencing option is a nonresidential program that may be used as an alternative to custody and may be focused at specific high-risk times of day, such as when the youth may be unattended and unsupervised.

A Pilot attendance centre program in Ontario has reported considerable success and was well received by Ontario youth court judges.

This measure may only occur if and attendance order program is available in the province. Provinces may decide not to implement this provision of the Act and are not required to make this option available.

Due to potential high costs associated with this program, provinces may be eligible for additional federal funding.

In the absence of such programs, a youth court judge may achieve similar ends by attaching specific conditions to a probation order handed down to a young person. The judge may also (as a condition of probation) require the young person to attend community programs.

The overall goal of attendance programs is to supervise young persons at times when they may be more prone to commit crimes, such as when left unattended by parents.

Sentencing Options 42(2)(n) The Act states that all custodial sentences must have a mandatory period of supervision in the community. The rationale behind the community supervision order is to provide support and supervision for the young offender's transition from custody back into their community.

When a judge sentences a young offender to a custody and supervision order under Section 42(2) (n) of the Act, it means that the young offender must serve time in custody, followed by a period of supervision in the community. The supervision order may be up to half as long as the custodial period. This sentencing option is for convicted youth criminals who are convicted for crimes other than murder, attempted murder, manslaughter, aggravated sexual assault or who are in custody as a result of an IRCS (Intensive Rehabilitative Custody and Supervision) order.

The length of the custodial sentence and supervision order combined must not exceed two or three years, depending on the type of offence. Offences other than for which an adult could receive life imprisonment are subject to a two-year maximum for the young offender. Offences for which an adult could receive life imprisonment, except murder, are subject to a three-year maximum for the young offender.

If a condition laid out by the judge or other officials is broken, or not met appropriately while under supervision in the community, reviews are held which determine whether the young offender's conditions should be changed or if he or she should be sent back into custody.

Sentencing Options 42(2)(o) Section 42(2)(o) of the Act establishes the length of time to be served in custody or in community supervision for cases of attempted murder, manslaughter, aggravated sexual assault. The total serving time for these periods cannot exceed 3 years since life imprisonment can be imposed on adults responsible for these offences. Under the Act, murder is the only offence that must result in a custody and supervision order. The maximum serving time is 10 years for first-degree murder and 7 years for second-degree murder.

Section 42(2) (o) also asserts the ability of the court to decide the duration of conditional supervision. Thus the supervision period does not have to be half the period of custody. This condition provides more liberty for the courts to respond with an appropriate sentence to serious offences. If a young person violates a condition during the supervision period, the provincial director may place the offender back into custody.

For other statutory considerations, the supervision part of the order includes mandatory and discretionary conditions (s. 105). Also, the amount of time served in custody by a young person can be extended via AG or provincial director's request to the YJC. However, the added duration of custody may not surpass the remainder of the youth sentence (s. 104).

Sentencing Options 42(2)(p) Under section 42(2)(p) of the Act, a judge may impose a deferred custody and supervision order as a sentencing option. A deferred custody and supervision order means that the young offender will not go into custody but will serve their sentence under supervision in the community with a set of strict conditions. If these conditions are not followed, then the conditions may be changed and the young person may be ordered to serve the balance of the sentence in custody. The order will be made if the offence committed is not a serious, violent one such as murder or aggravated assault, and if the young person has not committed an indictable offence that an adult would be imprisoned for, for more than two years. The order will be for six months or less and must be considered a just sanction that has meaningful consequences and will promote the young offender's rehabilitation and reintegration into society and contribute to the long-term protection of the public. The order will include both strict mandatory and optional conditions that the judge deems appropriate and which fall under subsection 105(2) and 105(3). These conditions will include reporting to the provincial director, attending school and/or working, not possessing weapons, abiding by curfews, reporting information changes and others.

Sentencing Options 42(2)(q) The Act section 42 (2) (q) outlines the following pertaining to custody and supervision for 1st and 2nd degree murder Offenders found guilty of 1st degree murder will get a maximum sentence of 10 years, including a maximum custody period of 6 years and a period of conditional supervision in the community. Offenders found guilty of 2nd degree murder will get a 7-year maximum sentence including a maximum custody period of 4 years and a period of conditional supervision in the community. Other statutory considerations are that the Attorney General or a provincial director may apply to extend the length of time the young person will spend in custody. The extension may not exceed the remainder of the youth sentence. At least one month prior to the expiration of the custodial portion of the sentence, the YJC sets conditions of the young person's conditional supervision.

The aforementioned sentences are not guaranteed as the Crown could recommend a harsher adult sentence if the offence meets certain requirements. When the Act was introduced the aspect that was publicized was "to respond more firmly and effectively to the small number of the most serious, violent young offenders" because the public was losing confidence in the youth justice system This was the reason for the harsh penalties for first- and second- degree murder, however, overall, the Act has decreased the number of youths within jails for non-violent offences substantially.

Sentencing Options 42(2)(r). This section provides that a judge may issue an intensive rehabilitative custody and supervision order. This sentence is intended to provide treatment for serious violent offenders. The court may only issue this order if any of the following criteria are met:

- the young person has been found guilty of murder, attempted murder, manslaughter, aggravated sexual assault, or a third serious violent offence
- the young person is found to be suffering from a mental or psychological disorder
- an individualized treatment plan for the young person has been developed
- the provincial director has determined that an intensive rehabilitative custody and supervision program is an available and suitable option

This section applies to young people ages twelve to seventeen as long as one or more of these conditions are met. The Youth Justice Court must specify the time period the order is applicable for. The maximum period for an intensive rehabilitative custody and supervision order is 2 years, unless the adult penalty for the offence includes imprisonment for life, in those cases the maximum period is 3 years. The only other exceptions occur in the case of:

- 1st degree murder: maximum period is 10 years including a maximum custody period of 6 years and a period of supervision in the community
- 2nd degree murder: The maximum period is 7 years including a maximum custody period of 4 years and a period of supervision in the community

Section 55 (2) (g) When the youth is sentenced to probation he or she is subject to certain conditions that may be imposed by the judge Under Section 55 (2) (g) the young offender may be told to "reside at a place that the provincial director may specify" This condition follows 2 other requirements that the young offender also needs to obey by a) keep the peace and be of good behaviour; and b) appear by the youth justice court when required by the court to do so this stated in Section 55 (1). The probation conditions follow those stipulated under section 42(2)(k) or (l). This means the director has the power to indicate where they want you to live, moving you from one area to the next depending on the circumstances surrounding the young offender's situation.

Section 59: Review of Non-Custodial Youth Sentences Under the Young Offender's Act, approximately 20% of custody sentences were charged based on "failure to comply" issues surrounding probation orders The Youth Criminal Justice Act revised these procedures recognizing that most issues concerning the violation of probation conditions were not criminal acts themselves and that in doing so, were compromising the integrity of the justice system itself. Therefore, the Act considers a review, rather than a charge, as a means of reducing the reliance on incarceration while being as fair as possible to the offender in assessing the seriousness of an offence

The Act reveals that a review, "can be issued at any time after six months of the initial youth sentence or, with leave of a youth justice court judge" (56). Also, reviews, in most cases, are exempt from those offenders who are charge with an offence outlined in section 42 of the Act. The full grounds for review are revealed under section 59.2 and are as follows:

- (a) on the ground that the circumstances that led to the youth sentence have changed materially;
- (b) on the ground that the young person in respect of whom the review is to be made is unable to comply with or is experiencing serious difficulty in complying with the terms of the youth sentence;
- (c) on the ground that the young person in respect of whom the review is to be made has contravened a condition of an order made under paragraph 42(2)(k) or (l) without reasonable excuse;
- (d) on the ground that the terms of the youth sentence are adversely affecting the opportunities available to the young person to obtain services, education or employment; or
- (e) on any other ground that the youth justice court considers appropriate

=== Adult sentence ===
If a young person was at least 14 years old at the time of the offence, and was found guilty of an offence for which an adult would be liable to receive more than two years imprisonment, the Crown may seek an adult sentence. In order for an adult sentence to be imposed, the Crown must prove, at the youth court, that:

1. The presumption of diminished moral blameworthiness of the young person has been rebutted beyond a reasonable doubt in the case, and
2. No available youth sentence could hold the young person accountable

A young person always carries the presumption of diminished moral blameworthiness, even for serious offences like first-degree murder. Therefore, the burden is always on the Crown to demonstrate that the young person was acting at the moral sophistication and maturity of an adult at the time of the offence. In the past, this burden was inverted for certain "presumptive offences", which meant that the young person was deemed to be as morally blameworthy as an adult unless they could prove otherwise. In 2008, the Supreme Court held those provisions unconstitutional in its seminal decision R v DB. Prior to the end of the regime, a "presumptive offence" was defined as murder, attempted murder, manslaughter, and aggravated sexual assault, as well as other "serious violent offences" in some circumstances. In 2025, this was further reinforced by R v I.M., whereas the requirement for the Crown to prove to "satisfaction" that "the presumption of diminished moral blameworthiness of the young person has been rebutted in the case" was overturned, and replaced with the beyond a reasonable doubt standard also requisite to find an offender guilty in Canadian criminal law.

There were a few important changes to Act compared to the Young Offenders Act, for example, the transfer process from a youth court to an adult court is eliminated. Instead, the youth court first determines whether or not the young person is guilty of the offence, and then, under certain circumstances, the youth court may impose an adult sentence,

=== Serious violent offences ===
The Act defines a serious violent offence as an offence in the commission of which a young person causes or attempts to cause serious bodily harm. Previously, a serious violent offence could become a presumptive offence if the young person had previously committed two violent offences. If a young person is charged for a serious violent offence, they could be sentenced to an "intensive rehabilitative custody and supervision order". It is an individualized treatment plan.

The court can make this order in specific circumstances:

- If the young person has been found guilty of murder, attempted murder, manslaughter, aggravated sexual assault or has committed at least two serious violent offences in the past,
- The young person is suffering from a mental or psychological disorder or an emotional disturbance,
- There are reasonable grounds to believe that the treatment plan might reduce the risk of the young person repeating the offence or committing other presumptive offences, and
- An appropriate program is available and the young person is suitable for admission.

=== Breach of probation ===
Section 137 of the Act outlines the definitions and consequences of failing to comply with a sentence or disposition, in other words, a breach of probation. It states that anyone failing to comply with their probation order is guilty of a punishable offence on a summary conviction. These orders can include failure to report to and be supervised by the provincial director when on probation, failure to perform community service plus many more stated in section 42(2) of the act. If a breach of probation occurs, the offender may be incarcerated provided it is not their first probation violation, and they harmed, or created a risk to, public safety in breaching their probation.

Differences in breach of probation in the Youth Criminal Justice Act versus Youth Offenders Act

The Young Offenders Act raised concern that too many young people were being incarcerated for offences not directly harming the community, but for failure to comply with the terms of probation. The Act recognizes that youths have a hard time complying with limits to behaviour and are deserving of a second chance. Since the Act was enacted, the number of charges of probation violation has remained similar while the number of cases has declined.

== See also ==
- Juvenile Delinquents Act
- Nunn Commission
