= Guindon v Canada =

- Supreme Court of Canada

Hearing: 5 December 2014 Judgment: 31 July 2015
- Full case name: Julie Guindon v Her Majesty The Queen
- Citations: 2015 SCC 41
- Docket No.: 35519
- Prior history: APPEAL from Canada v Guindon, 2013 FCA 153 (12 June 2013), setting aside Guindon v The Queen, 2012 TCC 287 (2 October 2012). Leave to appeal granted, Julie Guindon v Her Majesty the Queen, 2014 CanLII 12480 (20 March 2014).
- Ruling: Appeal dismissed.

Holding
- The SCC has a well‑established discretion, albeit one that is narrow and should be exercised sparingly, to address the merits of a constitutional issue when proper notice of constitutional questions has been given in that Court, even though the issue was not properly raised in the courts below.; Civil penalty proceedings under s. 163.2 of the Income Tax Act are of an administrative nature. They are not criminal in nature and do not lead to the imposition of true penal consequences. Therefore, G is not a person "charged with an offence" and accordingly, the protections under s. 11 of the Charter do not apply.

Court membership
- Chief Justice: Beverley McLachlin; Puisne Justices: Rosalie Abella, Marshall Rothstein, Thomas Cromwell, Michael Moldaver, Andromache Karakatsanis, Richard Wagner, Clément Gascon, Suzanne Côté

Reasons given
- Majority: Rothstein and Cromwell JJ, joined by Moldaver and Gascon JJ
- Concur/dissent: Abella and Wagner JJ, joined by Karakatsanis J
- McLachlin CJ and Côté J took no part in the consideration or decision of the case.

Laws applied
- Income Tax Act, R.S.C. 1985, c. 1 (5th Supp.), s. 163.2

Guindon v Canada [2015] S.C.R., 2015 SCC 41 is a landmark decision of the Supreme Court of Canada on the distinction between criminal and regulatory penalties, for the purposes of s.11 of the Canadian Charter of Rights and Freedoms. It also provides guidance on when the Court will consider constitutional issues when such had not been argued in the lower courts.

== Background ==
Guindon, a lawyer who specialized in family and wills and estates law, was approached in 2001 by promoters of a leveraged donation program which was said to operate in the following manner:

1. Each participant in the program would acquire timeshare units of a resort in the Turks and Caicos Islands.
2. The participants would donate these units to a charity at a fair market value greater than their cash payment for the timeshares.

Guindon agreed, for a fee, to provide an opinion letter on the tax consequences of this program on the basis of a precedent provided by the promoters. Although recommending that a tax lawyer and an accountant review her letter for accuracy, she proceeded to provide the letter to the promoters, knowing it would form part of their information package. The letter stated that the transactions would be implemented based on supporting documents that she had been provided with and had reviewed. However, she had not reviewed the supporting documents.

A charity with which Guindon was connected agreed to become the recipient of the promoted timeshares. In reality, no timeshare units were created and no transfers from the donors to the charity occurred. The Minister of National Revenue later disallowed the charitable donation tax credits claimed by the donors, and Guindon was assessed an administrative monetary penalty in 2008 for each of the tax receipts disallowed, amounting in total to almost $600,000.

Guindon appealed the assessment to the Tax Court of Canada, submitting that s. 163.2 of the Income Tax Act (Note: under which the penalties had been assessed) created a criminal offence, and thus was subject to the Charter protection afforded under s.11.

== The courts below ==
The TCC held that s. 163.2 was "by its very nature a criminal proceeding" and "involve[d] a sanction that is a true penal consequence," and in consequence vacated the assessment. Protests by the Crown that the constitutional issue was raised without proper notice (Note: as required under the Tax Court of Canada Act, R.S.C. 1985, c. T-2, s. 19.2) were overruled by the trial judge Bédard J.

The Federal Court of Appeal allowed the appeal, set aside the TCC's judgment, and restored the assessment against Guindon. In his ruling, Stratas JA held that:

1. Guindon’s failure to serve notice of a constitutional question was fatal to the Tax Court’s jurisdiction;
2. the TCC and the FCA, if asked to do so, could have exercised their discretion to adjourn the appeal to allow a notice to be served to address that matter, but Guindon did not make that request in either of the courts below; and
3. s. 163.2 of the ITA is not a criminal offence and therefore does not engage s. 11 of the Charter.

Leave to appeal to the SCC was granted in June 2013.

== At the SCC ==
By a unanimous decision, the appeal was dismissed. However, the Justices split 4:3 as to whether the constitutional issue should have been considered without prior notice, and only the majority addressed the constitutional issue.

=== Discretion of the Court ===
While the minority considered the Court's prior ruling in Eaton v Brant County Board of Education as requiring a mandatory notice of a constitutional question, as it "gives governments an opportunity to present evidence justifying the constitutionality of the law and permits all parties to challenge that evidence," and "allowing a party unilaterally to make an end-run around notice requirements by claiming that demonstrably constitutional arguments are not in fact constitutional arguments, rewards linguistic tactics at the expense of the public interest." The majority held that Eaton was not conclusive, as Sopinka J's judgment did not express a final opinion on the point. In addition, there have been numerous instances both before and after Eaton where the Court has addressed constitutional questions de novo without prior notice.

=== Engagement of s. 11 ===
S. 11 protection is available to those charged with criminal offences, not those subject to administrative sanctions, according to the test the Court has devised in R v Wigglesworth, which declares that a matter falls under s. 11 where;

1. by its very nature it is a criminal proceeding, or
2. a conviction in respect of the offence may lead to a true penal consequence.

In addition, Martineau v MNR declares that, in general, "proceedings of an administrative—private, internal or disciplinary—nature instituted for the protection of the public in accordance with the policy of a statute are not penal in nature." To determine whether a proceeding is criminal or administrative in nature, the Court must examine "(1) the objectives of the [Act]; (2) the purpose of the sanction; and (3) the process leading to imposition of the sanction."

In the present case, the Court declared that criticisms that the Wigglesworth/Martineau tests were unclear, circular in nature or not properly accounting for the modern context of administrative monetary penalties were unfounded, as:

1. the "criminal in nature test" identifies provisions that are criminal because Parliament or the legislature has provided for proceedings whose attributes and purpose show that the penalty is to be imposed via criminal proceedings; and
2. the "true penal consequence test" looks at whether an ostensibly administrative or regulatory provision nonetheless engages s. 11 of the Charter because it may result in punitive consequences.

In the case at bar, s. 163.2(4) of the ITA was held:

1. not to be a criminal proceeding in nature, as "the purpose of this proceeding is to promote honesty and deter gross negligence, or worse, on the part of preparers, qualities that are essential to the self-reporting system of income taxation assessment" and "[w]hile some regulatory penalties are imposed without consideration of the person’s state of mind, in other cases it is rational that the state would only wish to impose a penalty on those who engage in misconduct knowingly, recklessly, or with a particular intention."
2. not to attract a true penal consequence, as "high administrative monetary penalties [are] required to encourage compliance with the administrative regime. The relevant question is not the amount of the penalty in absolute terms, it is whether the amount serves regulatory rather than penal purposes."

== Impact ==
Several practical consequences were immediately apparent in Guindon:

1. If constitutional litigation is to be conducted, procedural requirements as to notice must be followed.
2. The integrity and honesty of advisors, planners and tax preparers is equally important to the integrity of the self- reporting system.
3. The objectives of the Income Tax Act are such that, at least in general terms, very significant penalties will not be prohibited by constitutional principles.

Commentators generally agree that Guindon is only a first step in the development of the case law concerning administrative proceedings:

- It does not discuss the defences available against the imposition of AMPs nor the issue of the burden of proof, but the matter has already been explored in a 2015 case in Quebec.
- The Charter is not the only source of judicial protection in administrative proceedings, as procedural and substantive challenges on judicial review can ensure that the administration stays within the boundaries of legality.
- The absence of s. 11 protection of the presumption of innocence is of great concern, although it is conceded that the legal system may grind to a halt if every allegation of misconduct could be tested in a full criminal proceeding.
- It will be difficult to challenge other AMPs imposed in the absence of procedural safeguards.
- The FCA provided more guidance in its judgment as to when an administrative penalty would be considered disproportionate, and it would have been helpful if the SCC had expanded on the point. However, in 2012 the Ontario Court of Appeal gave a reasoned evaluation for a monetary penalty that arose from a securities proceeding, which could be useful in future jurisprudence.

== See also ==
- List of Supreme Court of Canada cases (McLachlin Court)
