= Young Offenders Act =

Canadian statute

Parliament of Canada
- Citation: RSC 1985, c. Y-1
- Enacted by: Parliament of Canada
- Enacted: April 2, 1984
- Assented to: 1982

Repeals
- Juvenile Delinquents Act

Repealed by
- Youth Criminal Justice Act
- Status: Repealed

The Young Offenders Act (YOA; French: Loi sur les jeunes contrevenants) was an act of the Parliament of Canada, granted royal assent in 1982 and proclaimed in force on April 2, 1984, that regulated the criminal prosecution of Canadian youths.

The act was repealed in 2003 with the passing of the Youth Criminal Justice Act.

== Overview ==
The Young Offenders Act replaced the earlier Juvenile Delinquents Act enacted in 1908.

The Act established the national age of criminal responsibility at 12 years old, and said that youths can be prosecuted only if they break a law of the Criminal Code (previously, youths could be prosecuted or punished solely on the grounds that it was in the youth's best interests). The Act operated on the principle that justice for Youths would be better served through redirecting their criminal tendencies, rather than simply punishing them..

The Act also indicated that the rights established in the Canadian Charter of Rights and Freedoms apply to youths as well.

Controversy dogged the act for many years. Many felt that the Act's limit on a three-year detention sentence for youths was overly lax, and allowed youths to get unreasonably light sentences for murder or sexual assault. This maximum was repeatedly increased until in 1996 it was extended to a maximum of ten years. That same year, a provision was also made to allow 16-year-olds to be tried as adults in certain cases. Critics contended that this was too harsh, as it made youths possible victims of life sentences.

The Act also drew much criticism from the public for not charging young offenders under the age of 12 years, and for banning publication of the identities of youths who commit criminal acts, contending that the number of violent crimes committed by youths has dramatically increased, as has the number of repeat young offenders, since the act was passed. The demands by the Canadian public for changes for the better in dealing with youth crime, particularly in the wake of the beating and attempted murder in 1999 of then-15-year-old Jonathan Wambach in Newmarket, Ontario, by a gang of teenagers, led to the introduction of the Youth Criminal Justice Act to replace the Young Offenders Act in 2003.

== See also ==
- List of youth detention centre incidents in Canada
- Juvenile Delinquents Act
- Youth Criminal Justice Act
