= Administrative License Suspension =

Temporary driver's licence suspension by authorities

License suspension or revocation traditionally follows conviction for alcohol-impaired or drunk driving. However, under administrative license suspension (ALS) laws, sometimes called administrative license revocation or administrative per se, licenses are confiscated and automatically suspended independent of criminal proceedings whenever a driver either (1) refuses to submit to chemical testing (blood, breath or, in some states, urine), or (2) submits to testing with results indicating a blood alcohol content of 0.08% or higher.

Because ALS laws are immediate and require no proof of guilt, proponents such as Mothers Against Drunk Driving argue that they are more effective in reducing drunk driving than are traditional post-conviction sanctions, and that, in any event, driving is only a privilege. However, civil liberties advocates and other critics object to a procedure in which guilt is presumed and punishment is automatically imposed by the officer; they further point out that state and federal courts have held the driving privilege, once given, to be a vested right that cannot be taken away without due process. See, e.g., Schuman v. California, 584 F.2d 868 (1978).

The laws have also been criticized as constituting double jeopardy and/or multiple punishment. While the argument for double jeopardy is tenuous, that for multiple punishment may have merit: the driver has his license suspended by the State in the ALS proceedings, and then is punished by the State again in court for the same offense—the punishment often involving a second license suspension. While this issue has been resolved both ways in the past by state and federal courts, the currently prevailing view is that there is no multiple punishment since the suspension is only an administrative "sanction", not a criminal "punishment".

As of 2010, only nine states did not have ALS laws: Kentucky, Michigan, Montana, New Jersey, Pennsylvania, Rhode Island, South Carolina, South Dakota and Tennessee.

== The example of Texas ==
In the state of Texas, Administrative License Revocation is a process by which an individual who is arrested for Driving While Intoxicated (DWI) has his or her driver's license administratively suspended. This program went into effect on January 1, 1995, and is administrated by the Texas Department of Public Safety (DPS). DPS records indicate that 103,168 notices of suspension were served during the calendar year 2003. During that period, the agency processed 95,495 suspensions.

A suspension can occur from either the refusal to submit to a chemical test or results of 0.08 or greater alcohol concentration when a chemical test is taken. This blood alcohol concentration (0.08 grams percent) applies to drivers aged 21 and over, but a lower BAC level applies to underage drivers or any driver operating a commercial motor vehicle. DPS is also authorized to suspend the drivers licenses of minors who commit the offense of driving under the influence (DUI) as well as individuals who refuse to provide a specimen following an arrest for the offense of boating while intoxicated (BWI). The statutes concerning ALS are found in the Texas Transportation Code at Chapters 524 and 724.

The administrative license suspension process usually begins when a law enforcement officer determines that there is reasonable suspicion for an initial traffic stop of a motorist. If the officer has reason to believe that the driver is impaired, field sobriety tests are administered. If the driver performs poorly, the driver is arrested for DWI and transported to the police station. At the station, the officer will read to the driver the "Statutory Warning" and then request that driver submit to a breath or blood test to measure his/her alcohol concentration. If the driver refuses to provide a specimen or provides a specimen with a prohibited alcohol concentration, the officer serves a notice of suspension and confiscates the driver's license.

Procedures for handling minors vary slightly. A law enforcement officer must have reasonable suspicion to conduct a traffic stop, however, a full custodial arrest is not required. Once the officer determines that the individual is under 21 years of age and has reason to believe that he/she has consumed alcohol, the officer will issue the driver a citation for DUI, serve the notice of suspension, and confiscate the driver license. The minor may or may not be placed under arrest and a chemical test may or may not be requested. The officer may proceed with a custodial arrest procedure if he believes the individual is seriously impaired.

The driver has fifteen days from the date of the notice of suspension is served to request a hearing. If no hearing is requested, the suspension will automatically go into effect on the 40th day after notice was served.

The period of suspension is 90 days to a year, depending upon the existence of prior convictions; if a refusal to submit to testing is involved, the periods are 180 days to two years. Minors face suspensions of 60 to 180 days.

== Administrative suspension hearing ==
Assuming the license holder makes the demand for a hearing within the statutory period, a hearing is scheduled. The nature of these vary considerably from state to state. In some states, the hearing takes place in court before a judge. More commonly, however, an administrative hearing will be conducted by the state's Department of Motor Vehicles. The procedures for these administrative hearings vary as well. In some, the hearing will be presided over by an Administrative Law Judge (ALJ), the state's case will be presented by a prosecutor, and the officer will be required to testify. In a growing number of others, such as California, the role of "judge" and "prosecutor" are filled by one person—a DMV employee with no legal training—and the DMV's case can consist of no more than the arrest report; if the licensee wishes to cross-examine the officer, he must subpoena him and pay for his salary.
