= Contraventions Act =

Statute of Canada

Parliament of Canada
- Long title: An Act respecting contraventions of federal enactments
- Citation: S.C. 1992, c. 47
- Enacted by: Parliament of Canada
- Status: In force

The Contraventions Act (French: Loi sur les contraventions) is a statute enacted by the federal Parliament of Canada. The official long title of the law, which came into force on October 15, 1992, is An Act respecting contraventions of federal enactments (SC 1992, c 47 as amended). The Act and its associated regulations allow violations of minor federal laws to be prosecuted through a ticketing system rather than a formal criminal charge. Where an offence outlined in federal law has been designated by the federal government as a contravention, a police officer may choose to issue a ticket instead of laying criminal charges. Although the Act includes a full framework for federal ticketing, most of the law is not in force. Those parts that are in force allow provincial ticketing procedures to apply in those provinces that have signed an agreement with the federal government.
